= Nat Cohen =

British film producer and executive (1905–1988)

Nat Cohen (23 December 1905 – 10 February 1988) was a British film producer and executive. For over four decades he was one of the most significant figures in the British film industry, particularly in his capacity as head of Anglo-Amalgamated and EMI Films; he helped finance the first Carry On movies and early work of filmmakers such as Ken Loach, John Schlesinger, Alan Parker and David Puttnam. In the early 1970s while head of EMI Films he was called the most powerful man in the British film industry. He's been called "an unsung giant of British film who never got his due from the establishment in part because of (possibly unconscious) anti-Semitism... the ability to be a successful studio head is very rare and most only last a few years. Cohen did it successfully at various companies for over two decades."

== Early life ==
Cohen was the only son of Jessie (d. 8 October 1941) and Jacob Cohen who had emigrated from Poland (he had an older sister, Jenny). Jacob Cohen was a kosher butcher from the east end of London who was president of the Jubilee Street synagogue. He was a silent partner in a cinema in the east end. Cohen attended a local LCV school and then joined his father's business. However he was more interested in being involved in cinema and his father agreed.

=== Cinema owner ===
In 1932, Cohen bought a 650-seat cinema, the Savoy, in Teddington which he later called a "flea pit. I paid £5 for fourth and fifth reissues for three days. It was a modest living but one couldn't survive on that. I wanted to get into production and distribution." Later on the same year he headed a syndicate that converted the Regent Theatre into a cinema. Cohen's partner was Jerry Rafer, who was later killed in the war.

Over three years Cohen built up a circuit of three cinemas in London and four in the regions. One of the cinemas was the Mile End Empire, where Cohen ran talent quests before the movies commenced; among the artists who featured were a young Tommy Trinder and Bernard Delfont.

Cohen later said "the exhibition side wasn't exciting enough for me. I wanted to get into the production and distribution side." He turned to distribution, starting with re-releases of the Hal Roach comedies. "I was a loner," he said. "I mortgaged everything I had. If it had gone wrong I could not have bailed myself out."

During World War II, Cohen distributed and exhibited military instruction films in England. His wife and daughter were sent to stay with his friend Sam Goldwyn.

== Anglo Amalgamated ==
With Stuart Levy he co-founded Cohen and Levy Films in 1945 which eventually became Anglo-Amalgamated. His first film was an £800 documentary called Horse and Country.

Cohen produced some films with Dan Angel that were directed by Val Guest, Mystery at the Burlesque (1949) and Miss Pilgrim's Progress (1949).

=== Early features ===
Anglo-Amalgamated began to produce half hour featurettes at a cost of £10,000 then moved into features which were generally made out of Merton Park Studios. Their early films included Ghost Ship (1952), Crow Hollow (1952), and Wide Boy (1952). They started to make films with American stars such as Street of Shadows (1953) which had Cesar Romero. They also had success with comedies such as Glad Tidings (1953), adaptations of Edgar Wallace and travelogues. Many of these films were sold to television.

Cohen's first film of note was The Sleeping Tiger (1954), starring Alexis Smith and Dirk Bogarde, and directed by Joseph Losey, an American expatriate who had moved to Britain because he had been greylisted. Losey later said he was "very grateful to people like Nat Cohen, whom I don't very much like. He was prepared to employ me and it was essential for me to work." Losey later made The Intimate Stranger (1956) for Cohen.

Other movies included Portrait of Alison, Johnny You're Wanted and Assignment Abroad.

Cat Girl (1957) began relationship between Anglo-Amalgamated and American International Pictures. In 1958 Cohen returned from the US with a deal to distribute 28 films.

The relationship with AIP resulted in British shot films such as Horrors of the Black Museum (1959), The Headless Ghost, Circus of Horrors (1960), and Konga (1961).

=== Box-office success ===
Cohen had a big box office success with The Tommy Steele Story (1957), one of the most popular movies of the year in Britain. They followed it with The Duke Wore Jeans (1958) and Tommy the Toreador. "We've got to make films for teenagers these days," he said. These included a film version of Six-Five Special (1958).

Even more popular was Carry On Sergeant (1958), a huge box office success in Britain and very profitable due to its low cost. It led to a series of films, starting with Carry On Nurse (1959) which were even more popular – Cohen helped make fifteen Carry On movies before the series moved to Rank. Cohen later described these as "a giggle and a few innuendos" movies".

For the company, Cohen produced Peeping Tom (1960), directed by Michael Powell, and The Criminal (1960) from Joseph Losey. Peeping Tom was badly received at the time of its release although it is now highly regarded. Cohen and Levy distributed some popular Italian films such as Goliath.

In January 1961 Anglo Amalgamated announced it was going to spend £2 million to make 12 first features and ten second features, making it the most prolific filmmaking company in Britain. He said and Levy had made £750,000 in profit from the Carry On films alone. "The thing is not to go in for being artistic," he said. "I make fine pictures – pictures which make money – that's fine pictures. Artistic films are... well films about poets and composers and songs and artists." He was going to make Operation Overlord about D-Day but withdrew when Zanuck made The Longest Day.

=== Associated British ===
In April 1962 it was announced Associated British Picture Corporation had bought 50% of Anglo Amalgamated. The following month Levy's daughter died falling from a window.

Anglo-Amalgamated was approached by producer Joseph Janni who wanted to produce two films, A Kind of Loving and Billy Liar, both of which would be directed by John Schlesinger. Cohen later said "by the time we got to the Schlesinger films people realised we were bona fide. I have always counted goodwill as the most valuable thing I have." Cohen was impressed by Janni's track record as a producer and the projects. "I felt they had something which would get across to audiences – though how well and how rewardingly it was hard to tell," said Cohen. "But I did feel the change in audiences' tastes taking place at that time." A Kind of Loving was one of the most popular British films of the year.

Cohen went on to finance the first features of John Boorman and Ken Loach, (Poor Cow). He made some less successful films such as I've Gotta Horse.

Cohen continued to back films directed by John Schlesinger: Darling, which won several Oscars, and Far from the Madding Crowd.

Levy died in June 1966. After this Cohen ended his association with the Carry On films.

== EMI Films ==
In early 1969 EMI Films took over Associated British, which was the majority owned of Anglo Amalgamated. Cohen became a director on the board of Associated British in March 1969. Bernard Delfont called Cohen "the sort of filmmaker who knew all there was to know about popular demand". He said "Nat's track record was strong enough to make one believe that he was just what we needed to beef up our production schedule" so they bought out his company and made him chief executive although "there was a limit to what one man could achieve" so he hired Bryan Forbes as well.

Cohen continued to have his own unit. Among the films made by Associated British-Anglo Amalgamated were:

- Spring and Port Wine – this would be the first film issued under the EMI banner
- The Body
- Entertaining Mr Sloan
- All the Way Up – co production with Granada Films
- Eyewitness – with Associated Television Corporation

Eventually Cohen's unit became "Anglo-EMI".

The actual head of production at EMI Films was Bryan Forbes but Cohen had autonomy over his own unit. EMI were going to spend $36 million on 28 films, 13 of which would be from Cohen's Anglo-Amalgamated unit with a budget of £7 million. Cohen:

Right from the start of Bryan Forbes joining the company, there was a sharp distinction between his films and mine. If Bryan had a cocktail party to announce his programme, then I had a cocktail party a few weeks later for mine, too. I had all I needed to keep me at full strength.

"We now have a great opportunity for British productions by British people", said Cohen. Bryan Forbes later accused Cohen of being Forbes' "in built enemy" at EMI.

In November 1969 Nat Cohen and Bernard Delfont announced a slate of eight more films (bringing Anglo's total to thirteen) including:

- The Impotent starring Carol White and Malcolm McDowell (never made)
- The Practice from the novel by Stanley Winchester (never made)
- The Burden of Proof from a novel by James Barlow – this became Villain
- Percy the story of a penis transplant
- Jam Today from a novel by Susan Baratt to be called The Last Virgin Alive (never made)
- My Family and Other Animals from a book by Gerald Durrell produced by Michael Medwin (never made)
- Wise Child from Simon Gray's stage play (never made)
- a film starring Julie Christie
- a film directed by John Schlesinger.

Among the films Cohen made for Anglo-EMI included Get Carter, Percy, and several big screen adaptations of popular TV series. On the whole Cohen's movies for EMI outperformed those of Bryan Forbes financially. They were less well received critically, although Cohen's unit was the one that initiated the highly acclaimed The Go-Between (1971). It has been argued that Cohen, in contrast with Forbes, produced a slate that was "inexpensive, sellable and varied. It has some junk but also attempts to make some decent films and promote new talent. He backed as many newbie directors as Forbes but gave them safer material to work on. There are no huge production challenges, more co-productions to spread risk, and stars were cast in the sort of roles that made them stars."

=== The most powerful man in the British film industry ===
Following the resignation of Forbes, Cohen became overall head of production for EMI. In April 1971 Cohen was appointed managing director of EMI-MGM, a new company formed to make international films. He was also put in charge of Anglo-EMI Film Distributors, Anglo-EMI Films, and Anglo Southern Film Music Publishing.

By 1973, the British film industry was in crisis, due to a combination of declining audiences, a weak dollar and lack of overseas investment. Anglo-EMI was the biggest studio operating in the country and was dubbed "Britain's one man film industry." Cohen was described as:

The most powerful man in the British film industry and almost the final arbiter of film taste in this country. No single man in Hollywood at its zenith held as much power. Nat Cohen not only finances productions but also distributes and exhibits. One American producer cracked that that he wouldn't be surprised if Cohen didn't also own the popcorn concessions.

That year Cohen estimated he was involved in 70% of films made in Britain that year; other figures put this at 50%. He also claimed that 95% of the films he had been involved with had made money. "It's bad for the film industry that I'm the only man making films", he said. "Because of this I don't really enjoy my power. I need competition and it's important there's competition if the industry is to survive."

Cohen however was bullish about the British industry's chances.

I can tell you there are still wonderful opportunities in the film industry, good and wonderful opportunities... a good film is doing better than ever before. A lot of people who complain about the industry don't have their feet on the ground. Look at their track records. They're not very good. The industry still has life. There's gold in them thar hills I tell you.

Cohen financed key films in the career of David Puttnam, That'll be the Day (1973) and Stardust (1974). Puttnam said Cohen would "work out what his downside risk was, the most he would lose, so consequently he would never turn down a project that was remotely interesting." He said Cohen would routinely offer to pay part of the budget, meaning producers had to get the rest.

Puttnam's then-producing partner Sandy Lieberson later said Cohen "gave us a blank cheque in effect, but always kept the reins on. The man had a real flair for movies and was such an underrated figure in the British film industry in the sixties and seventies, probably the most underrated. He made a tremendous contribution... If he liked you, he'd back you. He hated failure, that was one thing he couldn't stand to be associated with."

In May 1973 Cohen announced a slate of seven films worth £5 million:

- Here There Be Dragons starring Joseph Bottoms – which became The Dove
- Wet Stuff with Elliot Gould and Donald Sutherland
- Swallows and Amazons
- Murder on the Orient Express
- Alfie Darling
- Hot Property with Cliff Richard – this became Take Me High
- The Killer Elite produced by Arthur Lewis

During this time Cohen also commissioned two short films from director Alan Parker who later wrote of Cohen:

Nat Cohen was an avuncular, vulgar man with a shifty, pencil thin moustache who looked more like a Soho strip club spiv than a film mogul. His lowbrow taste in film production had secured him a sizeable wallet and hence his puffed–up position running EMI. No one could remember any films he'd made except that they'd apparently made a ton of money – one of his racehorses had even won the 1962 Grand National. He drove up and down Wardour Street in a cream Rolls-Royce with a number plate that said Nat 1 (just to rub it in the noses of all of us snobby and opinionated film industry oiks who were less than enamored by him) to emphasize just who actually was the smart one.

It was argued "Cohen's bread-and-butter output consisted of big screen adaptations of TV series...mixed in with some late Hammer horrors... action films... star vehicles for local comics... sequels to hits... He still took risks with a few films every year: some didn't pay off...others turned out very well." In November 1973 EMI was awarded a Queens Award for Industry.

Cohen's best known and most successful film from this period was Murder on the Orient Express (1974), which Cohen said was his idea. Cohen later said this movie was the greatest success of his career – with Lady Caroline Lamb being his greatest disappointment. According to Filmink "after almost twenty five years of making movies he was the hottest executive in the business." This enabled Cohen to invest £6 million in eleven films:

- Evil Under the Sun (later made in 1982)
- Aces High
- Seven Nights in Japan
- Spanish Fly
- two adaptations of TV shows, The Likely Lads and The Sweeney
- To the Devil a Daughter
- All Things Bright and Beautiful (which became All Creatures Great and Small)
- The Nat King Cole Story (never made)
- a remake of Kind Hearts and Coronets (never made)
- Sergeant Steiner which became Cross of Iron.

"Some of the ideas might seem parochial," admitted Cohen, "but the market for 'parochial' films is growing."

An article in July 1975 called Cohen "Britain's only movie mogul." He said "I get the charge out of looking at films through the eyes of, shall I say, my public." He added that his career highlights were Julie Christie winning an Oscar for Darling and the success of Murder on the Orient Express.

In October 1975 EMI signed an exclusive distribution deal for £20 million of films from Dino de Laurentiis starting with Buffalo Bill and the Indians. These films would include King Kong, Drum and Orca.

=== EMI changes management ===
In May 1976, it was announced EMI bought out British Lion and their management, Michael Deeley and Barry Spikings, would join EMI. "It does not change my position in the slightest," insisted Cohen. "I shall continue to be chairman and chief executive of the EMI film production side." Alexander Walker of the Evening Standard reported that "EMI has been criticised as playing safe and investing in... parochial British comedies" and that the success with Orient was "not followed up as it should have." Nat Cohen had to oversee the collapse of the Trick or Treat film.

Eventually Michael Deeley and Barry Spikings became managing directors of EMI Films while Cohen became executive chairman. In October 1977 he retired from this position to become a consultant, succeeded by Lord Delfont, although he stayed on the board.

The final films listed as being "presented" by Nat Cohen included Are You Being Served?.

Cohen stayed at EMI for several more years, a period he described as "an awkward stage... not quite sure where I was supposed to be; and rarely finding people available when I wanted to consult them. A delicate situation." During this time, EMI made some expensive failures including Honky Tonk Freeway and Can't Stop the Music, none of which involved Cohen. "I suppose you could sum it up this way", he said later, "I was very fortunate that as these costly deals were being made, I seemed to be losing control of picture making in the company." Michael Deeley, however, claimed that Cohen committed $1 million of EMI's money for the flop Roar. Deeley said Cohen was "quite a different" type of executive to him and Spikings. "His style was defined by great lies", according to Deeley.

Cohen's last credit on a film was Clockwise which he had recommended to EMI's then head of production, Verity Lambert. When EMI Films was taken over by Cannon in 1986, Cohen set up as an independent producer and adviser hoping to make "one or two more Clockwises from up and coming filmmakers".

However Cohen is credited with no more films after Clockwise. According to Cohen's grandson, Paul Silver, being let go by EMI "came a bit of a killer for him, literally – he had no hobbies outside horse racing."

== Racehorse owner ==
With the success of his film company, Cohen was able to become a racehorse owner. His blue colours with white diamond, hooped sleeves and amber cap were carried to victory by Kilmore in the 1962 Grand National.

== Personal life ==
Cohen served as "chief barker" of the Variety Club in 1956 and became its elder statesman.

In 1931 Cohen married Ailsey Defries, daughter of Harry Defries (d. 21 April 1941), chairman of the Sterling Film Company. Cohen and his wife had two daughters, Jacqueline Marianne (b 1934) and Angela Shirley (b 14 April 1936). Aisley died of cancer on 6 March 1948. Their daughter Jacqueline had been diagnosed with Hodgkins disease in 1956 and lived in great pain; a drug introduced in 1959 caused her condition to improve but she had to go off it in 1964 – she died in February 1965, aged 31. She was survived by a husband Albert Shalet and daughter Caroline. Cohen never remarried after the death of his first wife but had a number of girlfriends.

Unlike many of his contemporaries such as James Carreras, Nat Cohen never received any honors, despite his business success and charity work.

Nat Cohen died in hospital in February 1988 after suffering a heart attack. He was survived by his daughter Angela, who married Martyn Silver in 1958. The address at Cohen's funeral was given by David Puttnam.

== Appraisal ==
In 1974 a profile of Cohen described him as:

A more urbane version of the one-man-bands who used to boss the studios in Hollywood's heyday of the movie moguls. An impresario, a bon vivant, a racehorse owner with many winds in his stable, he applies the lessons of the turf to the film industry when he affirms that 'there is no such thing as playing safe' and describes himself as 'a gambler, but an extremely cautious one. Never reckless. I gamble when the odds are in my favour, not simply on hunches. I back judgement, not luck. But, ultimately, gamble I've got to... when the proposition has merit, I put it into effect without delay. I made the decision on a combination of the project and the individual who brings it to me.'

Another 1971 article called him "a natty, cool, watchful man he does not admit to, and has never admitted to a crisis in the British film industry." Ned Sherrin called him "a short, spick and span, old-school mogul – a British version of the ex-furtrader tsars of Hollywood. A dapper little man with a cropped, military moustache, he loved making a deal, having a pretty girl on his arm, owning a Grand National winner... and showing off his flat in St James."

Michael Winner called him "the greatest movie executive I ever encountered in England."

Cohen said of himself:

Making films is no different from the manufacture of shoes or any other product... My job is to entertain the public and if I can combine commercialism and art, all the better. But I have to remember they have other means of entertainment and a limited amount of money... Films are a pure gamble and I always try to bet with the odds in my favour. It's not so much the film one gambles on as the people making it.

A 1988 obituary called him, "the British movie mogul par excellence, except that he was considered honourable and fair... a neat dresser, bon vivieur, he was much loved – not the least by the young ladies usually introduced as 'Have you met my niece?'"

== Filmography ==
- Murder at the Windmill (1949) – producer
- Shooting Stars (1950) (documentary) – producer
- Miss Pilgrim's Progress (1950) – producer
- Ghost Ship (1952) – executive producer
- Sport and Speed (1952) (documentary) – producer
- Crow Hollow (1952) – executive producer
- Wide Boy (1952) – producer
- The Dark Stairway (1953) – executive producer
- Street of Shadows (1953) – executive producer
- The Drayton Case (1953) – producer
- Glad Tidings! (1953) – executive producer
- Radio Cab Murder (1954) – executive producer
- Dangerous Voyage (1954) – executive producer
- The Sleeping Tiger (1954) – executive producer
- Escapement (1957) – executive producer
- Cat Girl (1957) – executive producer
- The Tommy Steele Story (1957) – executive producer
- The 6.5 Special (1958) – executive producer
- The Duke Wore Jeans (1958) – producer
- Carry On Sergeant (1958) – executive producer
- Female Fiends (1958) – executive producer
- Carry On Nurse (1959) – executive producer
- Horrors of the Black Museum (1959) – executive producer
- Peeping Tom (1960) – executive producer
- Circus of Horrors (1960) – executive producer
- A Christmas Carol (1960) – executive producer
- The Criminal (1960) aka The Concrete Jungle – executive producer
- Konga (1961) – executive producer
- Payroll (1961) – executive producer
- A Kind of Loving (1961) – executive producer
- Dentist on the Job (1961) – executive producer
- Carry On Cabby (1963) – executive producer
- Billy Liar (1963) – executive producer
- Carry On Jack (1963) – executive producer
- Nothing But the Best (1964) – executive producer
- Carry On Spying (1964) – executive producer
- The Masque of the Red Death (1964) – executive producer
- I've Gotta Horse (1964) – executive producer
- Gonks Go Beat (1964) – executive producer
- Three Hats for Lisa (1964) – executive producer
- The Tomb of Ligeia (1965) – executive producer
- City in the Sea (1965) – executive producer
- Catch Us If You Can (1965) – executive producer
- The Big Job (1965) – executive producer
- Carry On Cleo (1965) – executive producer
- Those Fantastic Flying Fools (1967) – executive producer
- Poor Cow (1967) – executive producer
- Shalako (1968) – executive producer
- Lock Up Your Daughters (1969) – executive producer
- The Year of Sir Ivor (1969) – executive producer
- All Neat in Black Stockings (1969) – executive producer
- The Body (1970) – executive producer
- The Chastity Belt (1971) – executive producer
- Up Pompeii (1971) – executive producer
- Villain (1971) – executive producer
- Up the Chastity Belt (1971) – executive producer
- Family Life (1971) – executive producer
- Percy (1971) – executive producer
- City Beneath the Sea (1971) – executive producer
- The Go-Between (1971) – executive producer
- Fear in the Night (1972) – executive producer
- A Time for Loving (1972) – executive producer
- Straight On till Morning (1972) – executive producer
- Up the Front (1972) – executive producer
- Demons of the Mind (1972) – executive producer
- Our Miss Fred (1972) – executive producer
- Made (1972) – executive producer
- That'll Be the Day (1973) – executive producer
- Our Cissy (1973) (short) – executive producer
- Footsteps (1973) (short) – executive producer
- Steptoe and Son (1973) – executive producer
- Love Thy Neighbour (1973) – executive producer
- Steptoe and Son Ride Again (1973) – executive producer
- Holiday on the Buses (1973) – executive producer
- The Final Programme (1973) – executive producer
- The House in Nightmare Park (1973) – executive producer
- Man at the Top (1973) – executive producer
- Swallows and Amazons (1974) – executive producer
- Take Me High (1974) – executive producer
- It's Not the Size That Counts (1974) – executive producer
- Stardust (1974) – executive producer
- The Dove (1974) – executive producer
- The Best of Benny Hill (1975) – presenter
- Monty Python and the Holy Grail (1975) – presenter
- Murder on the Orient Express (1974) – executive producer
- All Creatures Great and Small (1975) – executive producer
- Alfie Darling (1975) – executive producer
- A Boy and His Dog (1975) – executive producer
- Spanish Fly (1976) – executive producer
- Aces High (1976) – executive producer
- Seven Nights in Japan (1976) – executive producer
- It Shouldn't Happen to a Vet (1976) – executive producer
- The Likely Lads (1976) – executive producer
- Are You Being Served? (1977) – executive producer
- Sweeney! (1977) – executive producer
- Death on the Nile (1978) – executive producer
- Clockwise (1986) – executive producer

== Notes ==
- Delfont, Bernard (1990). East End, West End: An Autobiography. MacMillan.
- Walker, Alexander, Hollywood England Stein and Day, 1974
- Walker, Alexander, National Heroes, Harrap, 1985
