= A Christmas Carol (1960 film) =

1960 British short film by Robert Hartford-Davis

- Directed by: Robert Hartford-Davis
- Written by: Robert Hartford-Davis
- Based on: A Christmas Carol; 1843 novella by Charles Dickens
- Produced by: executive Nat Cohen; Stuart Levy
- Starring: John Hayter; Stuart Brown; Gordon Mulholland
- Production company: Alpha
- Distributed by: Anglo-Amalgamated (UK)
- Release date: 1960
- Running time: 28 minutes
- Country: United Kingdom
- Language: English

A Christmas Carol is a 1960 British short film directed and written by Robert Hartford-Davis and starring Bruce Anderson, Stuart Brown, John Hayter and Gordon Mulholland. It was written by Hartford-Davis based on the 1843 novella by Charles Dickens.

== Cast ==
- Bruce Anderson as Marley's Ghost
- Stuart Brown as Bob Cratchit
- John Hayter as Scrooge
- Gordon Mulholland as Scrooge's Nephew

== See also ==
- List of Christmas films
- Adaptations of A Christmas Carol
