= Ricochet (1963 film) =

1963 British film by John Llewellyn Moxey

- Directed by: John Llewellyn Moxey
- Written by: Edgar Wallace (novel); Roger Marshall
- Produced by: Jack Greenwood
- Starring: Maxine Audley; Richard Leech; Alex Scott
- Cinematography: James Wilson
- Edited by: Derek Holding
- Music by: Bernard Ebbinghouse
- Production company: Merton Park Studios
- Distributed by: Anglo-Amalgamated
- Release date: March 1963
- Running time: 64 minutes
- Country: United Kingdom
- Language: English

Ricochet is a 1963 British crime film directed by John Llewellyn Moxey and starring Maxine Audley, Richard Leech and Alex Scott. Part of the long-running series of Edgar Wallace Mysteries films made at Merton Park Studios, it was written by Roger Marshall based on the 1922 Wallace novel The Angel of Terror.

== Cast ==
- Maxine Audley as Yvonne Phipps
- Richard Leech as Alan Phipps
- Alex Scott as John Brodie
- Dudley Foster as Peter Dexter
- Patrick Magee as Insp. Cummings
- Frederick Piper as Siddall
- June Murphy as Judy
- Virginia Wetherell as Brenda
- Alec Bregonzi as Max
- Keith Smith as Porter
- Peter Torquill as Sgt. Walters
- Nancy Nevinson as Elsie Siddall
- William Dysart as first skater
- Barbara Roscoe as pretty girl skater
- Anne Godley as wardress
- Maris Tant as girl skater
- Marian Horton as waitress

== Critical reception ==
The Monthly Film Bulletin wrote: "Edgar Wallace's worldly, thinly ingenious story is here transposed to a contemporary suburban setting, rather effectively photographed under snow, and unimaginatively acted in the expressionless whisky-swilling convention of British second features. All the characters are pretty repulsive, and are allotted an appropriately nasty fate. Disbelief tends to dispel suspense, and the end is altogether too expected. The sound, though important to the plot, is rather over-recorded."

Kine Weekly wrote: "There is an expertise about the production that keeps the attention from start to finish. There are no loose ends to the plot and no untidy red herrings. The director has used some quite imaginative camera angles for atmospheric effect, but never lets them intrude. The direction, in short, is direct. Maxine Audley and Richard Leech are credible as the married protagonists and character sketches are filled in by Alex Scott, Dudley Foster, Patrick Magee and other excellent supporting artists."

== Bibliography ==
- Goble, Alan. The Complete Index to Literary Sources in Film. Walter de Gruyter, 1999.
