= Flat Two =

1962 British film by Alan Cooke

- Theatrical release poster
- Directed by: Alan Cooke
- Screenplay by: Lindsay Galloway
- Based on: story by Edgar Wallace
- Produced by: Jack Greenwood
- Starring: John Le Mesurier; Jack Watling
- Cinematography: Bert Mason
- Edited by: Derek Holding
- Music by: Bernard Ebbinghouse
- Production company: Merton Park Studios
- Distributed by: Anglo-Amalgamated
- Release date: 23 April 1962
- Running time: 60 minutes
- Country: United Kingdom
- Language: English

Flat Two is a 1962 British second feature film directed by Alan Cooke and starring John Le Mesurier and Jack Watling. The screenplay, is written by Lindsay Galloway, and also based on the 1924 story of the same name by Edgar Wallace. The film is part of Edgar Wallace Mysteries series, produced at Merton Park Studios for Anglo-Amalgamated from 1960 to 1965.

== Plot ==
Crooked casino owner Emil Louba is found murdered in his apartment. There are three suspects: architect Frank Leamington, whose fiancée Susan owed Louba money; Charles Berry, who had a grudge against him, and Warden, a barrister. Leamington is arrested, and is defended in court by Warden. As the case progresses Warden is forced to present evidence that establishes himself as the killer.

== Cast ==
- John Le Mesurier as Warden
- Jack Watling as Frank Leamington
- Bernard Archard as Trainer
- Barry Keegan as Charles Berry
- Ann Bell as Susan
- Campbell Singer as Hurley Brown
- Charles Lloyd Pack as Miller
- David Bauer as Louba
- Russell Waters as clerk of court
- George Bishop as judge
- Gerald Sim as doorman
- André Mikhelson as 1st croupier
- Monti De Lyle as 2nd croupier
- Adrian Oker as waiter
- Gordon Phillott as waiter
- John Wilder as doorman

== Critical reception ==
The Monthly Film Bulletin wrote: "Unexciting episode in the Edgar Wallace series. The improbable plot depends far too much on verbal explanations and neither the direction nor the characterisation is strong enough to sustain it. But the playing is at least competent."
