= Crossroads to Crime =

1960 British film by Gerry Anderson

- Original title
- Directed by: Gerry Anderson
- Screenplay by: Alun Falconer
- Produced by: Gerry Anderson
- Starring: Anthony Oliver; Ferdy Mayne; Miriam Karlin; George Murcell; David Graham; Arthur Rigby
- Cinematography: John Read
- Edited by: David Elliott
- Music by: Barry Gray
- Production company: AP Films
- Distributed by: Anglo-Amalgamated
- Release date: 1960
- Running time: 57 minutes
- Country: United Kingdom
- Language: English
- Budget: £16,250

Crossroads to Crime is a 1960 British crime film produced and directed by Gerry Anderson and distributed by Anglo-Amalgamated (AA). Starring Anthony Oliver, George Murcell, Miriam Karlin, David Graham and Ferdy Mayne, Crossroads to Crime is about a police constable who works undercover to bring down a gang of lorry hi-jackers. Made as a B movie by Anderson's production company AP Films (APF), which made children's puppet television series, it was APF's first film production as well as its first production with live actors. It was also the only film that Anderson directed.

Nat Cohen and Stuart Levy of AA hired Anderson to make the film while he was struggling to find a distributor for Supercar and came to them seeking work. Made on a low budget of £16,250, the one-hour film was shot mostly on location between May and June 1960. Several of the cast and crew had been involved in earlier APF productions and would continue their association with Anderson; they included actor David Graham and the film's composer Barry Gray. APF's three co-directors – John Read, Reg Hill and Sylvia Thamm – served as cinematographer, art director and script supervisor.

Released in late 1960, Crossroads to Crime was a commercial failure and the critical response has been largely negative. Although the film was described by one commentator as a competent "cops and robbers" thriller, criticism has been directed at its script, editing, set design and low production values. The film has been broadcast more than once on British TV since the end of its brief theatrical run. It was released on DVD in 2013.

== Plot ==
While on the beat, Police Constable Don Ross discovers a gang of lorry hi-jackers operating from the back of a transport café. Gang members Diamond and Johnny drive away in a car with the café owner, Connie Williams, held hostage in the back seat. Ross tries to stop the car by jumping onto its side but is thrown to the ground and suffers a head injury. Pretending to be innocent passers-by, Diamond and Johnny take Ross home. Williams is brought before the hi-jackers' affluent ringleader, Miles, who warns her not to betray them to the authorities.

Despite evidence linking the gang to a spate of vehicle thefts along the A1 road, Ross is unable to persuade his superior, Sergeant Pearson, to investigate the café. He therefore takes matters into his own hands, confronting Diamond with what he knows and forcing the gangster to bribe him in exchange for his silence. Learning of Ross' private investigation, Pearson threatens him with dismissal, placing strain on Ross's relationship with his wife Joan. Nevertheless, Ross continues to gather evidence as the hi-jackers capture a shipment of cigarettes.

As the gang prepare to make one last raid – this time, targeting a £20,000 haul of nickel ingots – Ross joins the operation in a bid to expose and topple Miles. Discovering Ross's treachery, Diamond pulls a gun on the officer and chases him through the café cellars. He wounds and eventually corners Ross only to be shot dead by Johnny, who is revealed to be an undercover detective. Johnny tell Ross that the authorities know Miles' location and that soon the whole gang will be arrested. Ross returns to his life as an ordinary beat constable.

== Cast ==
- Anthony Oliver as PC Don Ross
- Ferdy Mayne as Miles
- George Murcell as Diamond
- Miriam Karlin as Connie Williams
- Victor Maddern as Len
- Patricia Heneghan as Joan Ross
- Arthur Rigby as Sergeant Pearson
- David Graham as Johnny
- Terence Brook as Harry
- Geoffrey Denton as Miles' Butler
- Peter Diamond as Police Escort
- William Kerwin as Martin
- J. Mark Roberts as Phillips
- David and Terry Sale as Youths
- Bill Sawyer as Lorry Driver
- Donald Tandy as Basher
- Harry Towb as Paddy

== Production ==
In early 1960, Gerry Anderson sought work from Nat Cohen and Stuart Levy of AA after Granada Television rejected APF's proposal for Supercar, the planned follow-up to Four Feather Falls. AA, which had helped to commission Four Feather Falls after responding positively to its first episode, produced mainly low-budget B movies with short running times to increase the amount of British-made content in its output. Wanting to establish himself as a film director, Anderson agreed to make a B movie for Cohen and Levy with no contract and a budget of only £16,250 (about £326,000 in 2025). The script was written by Alun Falconer, whose previous writing credits included the thriller Never Let Go and the crime drama The Unstoppable Man. The film references Four Feather Falls as an in-joke during a scene in which two young men consider playing a tune from the series on the transport café's jukebox.

Anderson cast Anthony Oliver as Ross because he had been impressed by the actor's performance in the West End production of Agatha Christie's The Mousetrap. David Graham had appeared in a 1957 episode of The New Adventures of Martin Kane that Anderson had directed. Two of the cast performed in other APF productions: George Murcell provided the voices of Professor Popkiss and Masterspy in the first series of Supercar while Graham voiced various characters in APF series throughout the 1960s.

=== Filming ===
The film was shot in and around Slough and Maidenhead over five weeks between May and June 1960. The shoot made use of APF's own studios and a nearby café, both located on the Slough Trading Estate, which respectively appeared as the gang's warehouse and the transport café. When night filming inside the café ran into the early hours of the morning, the crew fitted black drapes to the windows to block out the dawn sun and keep the light levels consistent. Other filming locations included Burnham Beeches and various points along the A4 road. The crew also filmed for one day at Halliford Studios in Shepperton.

According to Anderson, Ferdy Mayne sometimes misinterpreted the script, with humorous results. A scene between Ross and café owner Connie (Miriam Karlin) required several takes to film when Karlin repeatedly upstaged Oliver, altering the physical arrangement of the two shot so that the other actor ended up with his back to the camera. Terence Brook, who was known for his appearances in adverts for Strand cigarettes and was cast as gangster Harry on the basis of his "tough guy" image, was doubled by editor and second unit director David Elliott for a stunt that involved his character jumping off the back of a lorry. Sylvia Thamm, one of the co-directors of APF, served uncredited as script supervisor; she and Anderson married later in 1960 after Anderson divorced his first wife.

=== Post-production ===
Composer Barry Gray recorded the score in six hours on 21 June 1960. The opening theme was re-used as incidental music in several later APF productions: the Supercar episode "The White Line", the Fireball XL5 episode "The Robot Freighter Mystery" and the Captain Scarlet and the Mysterons episode "Manhunt". A biography of Gray suggests that the score's instrumental nature influenced Gray's compositions for Thunderbirds and other Anderson series.

To ensure a family-friendly U certificate from the British Board of Film Censors (BBFC), various expletives were dubbed over during post-production; for example, "bloody" was replaced with the milder "ruddy". References to "quid" (slang for pound sterling) were also changed to make the film more accessible to American audiences. The BBFC certified the film U on 26 July 1960.

== Release ==
The film was released in October or November 1960 as the second feature to The Criminal. Its tag line was "£20,000 the Prize and Death the Price!" The film was later incorporated into the Edgar Wallace Mysteries series (also distributed by AA) and re-edited with new opening titles. Since the 1960s, the film has been shown more than once on British television, most recently on Talking Pictures TV. The British Film Institute owns a print of the film, which it screened at Bradford's Pictureville Cinema in 1997 to celebrate Anderson's TV and film career.

The film's first home video release was a Region 2 DVD that was published by Network Distributing in 2013. The DVD print uses the "Edgar Wallace" titles, with the originals included as a bonus feature. Also included is a behind-the-scenes film, Remembering Crossroads to Crime, comprising interviews with Gerry and Sylvia Anderson, David Elliott and David Graham. Prior to the DVD release, the BBFC re-classified the film PG for "moderate violence".

== Reception ==
When the film finished and the lights came up, there was complete silence. Then Nat Cohen turned round slowly and said, "Well, I've seen worse." In retrospect, I can smile about it. But whenever I work on a production I give it my all in terms of energy and hours spent trying to get it right. Crossroads to Crime was no exception. So at the time I felt terrible about it not being up to the standard I'd hoped it would be.

— Gerry Anderson on Anglo-Amalgamated's reaction

Crossroads to Crime was a box office failure and critical response to the film has been mostly negative. Anderson once described it as "possibly the worst film ever made", while Elliott has called it "awful". Cohen and Levy were also unimpressed and did not give Anderson any more work. While promoting Thunderbirds Are Go in 1966, Sylvia Anderson said of Crossroads to Crime, "The less said about it, the better"; in her autobiography, she noted that it "hardly ranks as one of our best efforts".

In an interview, Graham recalled seeing the film at a London cinema and hearing the reaction of an audience member: "I went to this cinema in Kilburn and I sat squirming through this film [...] It was so bad it became a classic, possibly! As I got up to go a voice behind me said, 'What a fucking awful picture!'" A contemporary review in Monthly Film Bulletin was more upbeat: "Quick off the mark, this modest little thriller soon settles down into a routine 'cops and robbers' format, efficient if not always too convincing." Stronger praise came in an October 1960 issue of Kine Weekly, which commended Crossroads to Crime for being "refreshingly free from pretence". The review added: "The film's moral is lofty, its tender domestic asides encourage feminine interest, and the climax is a corker."

Gerry Anderson biographers Simon Archer and Marcus Hearn consider Gray's score overbearing and ill-suited to the subject matter, stating that its "innovative combination of booming brass and twangy electric guitar was possibly intended to evoke the contemporary sounds of Stanley Black or John Barry, but fell wide of the mark on both counts." They regard Mayne as a "saving grace" but judge the film to be "irredeemably compromised by its prosaic settings, convoluted screenplay and minuscule budget". Hearn describes Anderson's direction as "clumsy" and sums up Crossroads to Crime as "one of the most unappealing B movies of its era". Stephen La Rivière writes that the film is "remembered with dread", calling the plot both "wafer-thin" and "tedious" and the overall production "more than a little rough around the edges". He argues that Crossroads to Crime is only remembered because of the success of Thunderbirds.
