= Dangerous Voyage =

1954 British film by Vernon Sewell

- American theatrical release poster
- Directed by: Vernon Sewell
- Written by: Vernon Sewell; Julian Ward
- Produced by: Nat Cohen; Stuart Levy; William H. Williams
- Starring: William Lundigan; Naomi Chance; Vincent Ball
- Cinematography: Josef Ambor
- Edited by: Geoffrey Muller
- Music by: Allan Gray
- Production company: Merton Park Studios Productions
- Distributed by: Anglo-Amalgamated Film Distributors
- Release date: 5 April 1954
- Running time: 72 minutes
- Country: United Kingdom
- Language: English

Dangerous Voyage (U.S. title Terror Ship) is a 1954 British crime thriller B film directed by Vernon Sewell and starring William Lundigan, Naomi Chance and Vincent Ball. It was written by Sewell and Julian Ward and was distributed by Anglo-Amalgamated in the UK, and in the United States by Lippert Pictures.

== Plot ==
Author Peter Duncan investigates the circumstances of a damaged yacht and its crew who are taken under tow off the English coast, and the subsequent disappearance of the crew before they reach land. The mast is somehow radioactive but after replacement a geiger counter still picks up a strong reading. When they try to find the old mast on the junk heap, it has disappeared.

== Cast ==
- William Lundigan as Peter Duncan
- Naomi Chance as Joan Drew
- Vincent Ball as John Drew
- John Warwick as Carter
- Jean Lodge as Vivian Bolton
- Kenneth Henry as Insp. Neal
- Beresford Egan as Hartnell
- Peter Bathurst as Walton
- Richard Stewart as Sgt. French
- Stanley Van Beers as coroner
- Hugh Morton as inquiry chairman
- Armand Guinle as Fourneau
- John Serret as 1st gendarme
- Monti DeLyle as 2nd gendarme
- Guy Standeven as clerk of the court
- Oliver Johnston as Dr. Waverley

== Production ==
The film was shot at Merton Park Studios in London, with sets designed by art director George Haslam. Location shooting took place in the English Channel, in Honfleur in France, and Shoreham in Sussex. It was part financed by Anglo Amalgamated and like many of that company's crime films had an imported star.

Vernon Sewell later said the film was originally to be about motor car racing and he refused to direct it. As they had already contracted William Lundigan they hired a blacklisted American screenwriter to change the script to be set on Sewell's yacht.

== Reception ==
Kine Weekly wrote: "Windswept crime melodrama set mainly on the briny. ... A slap-up climax makes it watertight. Good British 'programmer'".

The Monthly Film Bulletin said "Average mystery film which makes use of the latest developments in popular science to find a new way of disposing of the villains."

In British Sound Films David Quinlan says: "Same old British 'B' problem: good ideas but mediocre execution. Laughs in the wrong places."
