= Shooting Stars (1950 film) =

- Directed by: Ray Densham
- Produced by: Ray Densham executive Nat Cohen; Stuart Levy
- Starring: Sylvia Peters
- Production company: Densham Productions
- Distributed by: Anglo-Amalgamated
- Release date: 1950
- Running time: 3100 feet
- Country: United Kingdom
- Language: English

Shooting Stars is a 1950 British documentary film about movie stars directed by Ray Densham. It was one of the earliest productions from Anglo-Amalgamated.
