= Glad Tidings (film) =

1953 film by Wolf Rilla

- Directed by: Wolf Rilla
- Written by: Wolf Rilla
- Based on: play by R. F. Delderfield
- Produced by: Victor Hanbury; John Bremer executive: Nat Cohen; Stuart Levy
- Starring: Barbara Kelly; Raymond Huntley; Ronald Howard; Jean Lodge
- Cinematography: Eric Cross
- Edited by: Peter Seabourne
- Music by: Wolf Rilla
- Production company: Insignia Films
- Distributed by: Eros Films (UK)
- Release date: August 1953 (UK)
- Running time: 67 minutes
- Country: United Kingdom
- Language: English

Glad Tidings is a 1953 British second feature ('B') comedy film directed by Wolf Rilla and starring Barbara Kelly, Raymond Huntley and Ronald Howard. It was written by Rilla based on the play of the same title by R. F. Delderfield.

== Plot ==
A retired RAF officer returns home to his sleepy little rural community with an attractive new American fiancée, to the initial resentment of his children.

== Cast ==
- Barbara Kelly as Kay Stuart
- Raymond Huntley as Tom Forester
- Ronald Howard as Corporal Nicholas Brayne
- Jean Lodge as Celia Forester
- Terence Alexander as Flight Lieutenant Spud Cusack
- Diana Calderwood as Josephine Forester
- Laurence Payne as Clive Askham
- Arthur Howard as Mr. Boddington
- Brian Smith as Derek Forester
- Yvette Wyatt as Miggs Forester
- Doris Yorke as Mrs. Boddington
- Stella Richman as Anna
- Harry Green as the golfer
- John Warren as club barman
- Louis Matto as waiter
- Peter Forbes-Robertson as reception clerk

== Production ==
The film was made at Nettlefold Studios, Walton-on-Thames, England, and on location. Art direction was by John Stoll. It was a rare early comedy from Anglo Amalgamated.

== Critical reception ==
The Monthly Film Bulletin wrote: "A slow moving and not very amusing screen version of R. F. Delderfield's domestic comedy. The playing on the whole is adequate, and Raymond Huntley, as usual, gives a polished performance."

Kine Weekly wrote: "The picture, which depends more on situation and dialogue than action for its fun, is smoothly portrayed by Barbara Kelly, Raymond Huntley, Ronald Howard and a host of sound supporting players, and their sure timing more than atones for its lack of movement. Jolly and sentimentally refreshing, it makes its point without wearing out shoe leather."

Picturegoer wrote: "Entertaining enough in parts, but so theatrical that you can almost hear the rattle of matinée teacups."

Picture Show called the film "an amusing light comedy."

TV Guide wrote: "Plodding domestic trifle."

Sky Cinema said that the film provided "Raymond Huntley and Barbara Kelly (Bernard Braden's wife) with rare leading roles in a feature film. Huntley gets a chance to break away from his stuffy bureaucrats and he's a pleasure to watch."
