= Time to Remember =

1962 film by Charles Jarrott

- Directed by: Charles Jarrott
- Written by: Arthur La Bern
- Based on: The Man Who Bought London by Edgar Wallace
- Produced by: Jack Greenwood
- Starring: Yvonne Monlaur; Harry H. Corbett; Robert Rietty
- Cinematography: Bert Mason
- Edited by: Derek Holding
- Music by: Bernard Ebbinghouse
- Production company: Merton Park Studios
- Distributed by: Anglo-Amalgamated
- Release date: July 1962
- Running time: 58 minutes
- Country: United Kingdom
- Language: English

Time to Remember is a 1962 British crime film directed by Charles Jarrott and starring Yvonne Monlaur, Harry H. Corbett and Robert Rietty. It was written by Arthur La Bern, based on the 1915 Edgar Wallace novel The Man Who Bought London.

It was part of the Edgar Wallace Mysteries film series made at Merton Park Studios

== Plot ==
Jumbo Johnson is trapped by the police while robbing jewels from a house. He climbs to the roof and stuffs the jewels down the chimney, then falls off the roof. Before he dies he tells his wife about the hidden loot. When she tries to buy the house Burgess, the estate agent, is suspicious and finds the jewels. Victor, one of Johnson's associates, is also seeking the jewels, surprises Burgess, who kills Victor, bricking up his body in the chimney. He subsequently buys the house. Johnson's wife, realising that Burgess has duped her, claims the reward for the jewellery and alerts the police.

== Cast ==
- Yvonne Monlaur as Suzanne
- Harry H. Corbett as Jack Burgess
- Robert Rietty as Victor
- Ernest Clark as Cracknell
- David Lodge as Jumbo Johnson
- Ray Barrett as Sammy
- Patricia Mort as Vera
- Genine Graham as Mrs. Johnson
- Jack Watson as Inspector Bolam
- Andre Charisse as Inspector Charcot
- Larry Taylor as Garritty
- Brenda Kaye as secretary
- Marjie Lawrence as Vivienne
- Brian Hewitt-Jones as police constable
- Peter Howard-Johnson as police sergeant
- Pat Gorman as police constable
- John Tatum as plain-clothes policeman

== Reception ==
The Monthly Film Bulletin wrote: "An inept and sometimes incoherent addition to the Edgar Wallace series, in which everybody double-crosses everybody without taking time off for explanations (how did Burgess know which chimney to look in, and wouldn't Victor's body have begun to smell somewhat before the lease was signed and Burgess able to move in to deal with it?). The resulting cracking pace is about the only thing one can be thankful for."
