= Sylva Langova =

Czech actress (1921–2010)

- Born: Sylva Langová; 31 August 1921; Plzeň, Czechoslovakia
- Died: 15 January 2010 (aged 88); London, England
- Occupation: Actress
- Years active: 1940–1999
- Spouse: David Williams

Sylva Langova (Czech: Sylva Langová; 31 August 1921 – 15 January 2010) was a Czech actress who from the late 1940s lived and worked in England.

== Partial filmography ==
=== Film ===
Year	Title	Role	Notes
1935	Král ulice	Nanynka	
1940	Dívka v modrém	Slávinka	
1940	Panna	Milena Kacíková	
1946	The Heroes Are Silent	Marta Vondrová	
1947	The Antlers	Zuzanka	
1952	The Woman's Angle	Blonde in sleigh	
1955	Little Red Monkey	Hilde Heller	US: 'Case of the Red Monkey'
1963	Incident at Midnight	Vivienne Leichner	Edgar Wallace Mysteries
1979	Avalanche Express	Olga	
1989	Follow Me	1. alte Frau	
1998	The Bed	Babička	

=== Television ===
Year	Title	Role	Notes
1957	Destination Downing Street	Sylvia	TV series
1961	Maigret	Adrienne	"The Experts"
1961	International Detective	Helene Romny	"The Anthony Case"
1961	The Avengers	Lisa Strauss	"Dragonsfield"
1962	The Avengers	Sheila Gray	"The Mauritius Penny"
1963	Man of the World	Anna	"The Prince"
1965	Contract to Kill	Lena Fischer	"Death in Cologne"
1973	Spy Trap	Adele Onslow	"Areas of Guilt"
1977	Secret Army	Mme. Marcelle Gerome	"Bait"
1988	Screen Two	Companion in café	"Border"
