= André Mikhelson =

Russian actor (born 1903)

André Mikhelson was a Russian actor, in mostly British films. He was born in Moscow, in 1903.

== Selected filmography ==
- The Gambler and the Lady (1952) - El Greco (uncredited)
- Desperate Moment (1953) - Polizei Inspector
- Star of My Night (1954) - Papa Condor
- The Divided Heart (1954) - Prof. Miran
- To Paris with Love (1955) - Head Porter (uncredited)
- Break in the Circle (1955) - Russian thug answering Ludwigstrasse door
- Little Red Monkey (1955) - East German Chief of Border Guards (uncredited)
- I Am a Camera (1955) - Head Waiter (Troika)
- The Intimate Stranger (1956) - Steve Vadney
- The Iron Petticoat (1956) - Charash
- Loser Takes All (1956) - Head Waiter (uncredited)
- Anastasia (1956) - Older Man (uncredited)
- Guilty? (1956) - Santos
- Dangerous Exile (1957) - Prison Doctor Perrot (uncredited)
- The Diplomatic Corpse (1958) - Hamid
- The Inn of the Sixth Happiness (1958) - Russian Commissar (uncredited)
- A Touch of Larceny (1959) - 2nd Russian Officer (uncredited)
- Bobbikins (1959) - Russian Radio Announcer (uncredited)
- Beyond the Curtain (1960) - Russian Colonel
- Dead Lucky (1960) - Croupier
- Edgar Wallace Mysteries, (The Man Who Was Nobody', episode), (1960) - (with Hazel Court) ' Croupier
- The Long Shadow (1961) - Feredi
- The Pursuers (1961) - Von Krosig
- The Middle Course (1961) - Commandant
- Edgar Wallace Mysteries, ("Flat Two" episode) (1962) - 1st. Croupier - (as Andre Mikhelson)
- Gaolbreak (1962) - Martinetti
- The Password is Courage (1962) - German Officer at Optician's (uncredited)
- Number Six (1962) - Head Waiter
- Call Me Bwana (1963) - Soviet Advisor (uncredited)
- Children of the Damned (1964) - Russian official
- Ring of Spies (1964) - Russian Embassy Official (uncredited)

Mikhelson also appeared in the Scotland Yard (film series), ('The Crossroad Gallows' episode, 1958); one episode of The Invisible Man (1958 TV series), ('Shadow on the Screen', (broadcast 25 July 1959), with Greta Gynt, and Edward Judd; and the television series: Assignment Foreign Legion, (1956), (with Merle Oberon, and Martin Benson (actor)); The Vise (1955 TV series), (1957); White Hunter (TV series), (1957-'59); Saturday Playhouse, (1958–61); Danger Man; Zero One (TV series), (1962-'65), with Nigel Patrick; and three episodes of The Third Man (TV series), 1959-'65, with Michael Rennie, as Harry Lime.
