= Radio Cab Murder =

1954 British film by Vernon Sewell

- Original Australian poster
- Directed by: Vernon Sewell
- Written by: Vernon Sewell; Pat McGrath
- Produced by: George Maynard; Nat Cohen; Stuart Levy
- Starring: Jimmy Hanley; Lana Morris; Sonia Holm; Jack Allen
- Cinematography: Geoffrey Faithfull
- Edited by: Peter Graham Scott
- Music by: Hubert Clifford
- Production company: Insignia Films
- Distributed by: Eros Films
- Release date: October 1954
- Running time: 70 minutes
- Country: United Kingdom
- Language: English

Radio Cab Murder is a 1954 British second feature crime film directed by Vernon Sewell and starring Jimmy Hanley, Lana Morris and Sonia Holm. It was written by Sewell and Pat McGrath and made by the independent Eros Films.

== Plot ==
After serving a term in prison for safe-cracking, World War Two veteran and ex-con Fred Martin finds work as a taxi cab driver. He is engaged to be married to Myra, the cab company's dispatcher, a former member of the Women's Royal Naval Service. While picking up a fare, Martin witnesses a bank robbery and tails the criminals, but his cab is wrecked during the chase. The police find a well-known safe-cracker dead of apparent natural causes and ask Martin to go undercover, join the bank-robbery gang, and expose its leader. His boss arranges a sham firing based on his having wrecked his cab, but this causes a revolt among the cabbies, who plan to go on strike to support his reinstatement. The robbery is carried off, but the gang discovers Martin's identity and tries to kill him by locking him in a deep freezer at an ice cream factory. He is saved by his cabby comrades, his boss, and Myra, who ride to the rescue and corner the crooks with the aid of the police.

== Cast ==
- Jimmy Hanley as Fred Martin
- Lana Morris as Myra
- Sonia Holm as Jean
- Jack Allen as Parker
- Sam Kydd as Spencer
- Pat McGrath as Henry
- Michael Mellinger as Tim
- Charles Morgan as Maclaren
- Bruce Beeby as Inspector Rawlings
- Rupert Evans as Williams
- Elizabeth Seal as Gwen
- Jack Stewart as Gregson
- Frank Thornton as Inspector Finch
- Trevor Reid as commissioner
- Edwin Richfield as Nat
- Jane Harwood as cashier
- Madge Brindley as Mrs Evans
- Joan Carol as scientific officer
- Leonard Sharp as Evans, the first watchman (uncredited)
- Ian Wilson as second watchman (uncredited)
- Vernon Greeves as radio operator (uncredited)

== Production ==
It was made at Walton Studios and on location around Kensington and Notting Hill in London. The film's sets were designed by the art director John Stoll.

== Critical reception ==
The Monthly Film Bulletin wrote: "A second-rate little thriller, which tries very hard to be realistic and fails hopelessly. The plot contains far too many coincidences to appear credible, and the players are unable to do very much with the material at their disposal."

The Radio Times gave the film two out of five stars calling it a "routine British thriller."

TV Guide also gave it two out of five stars and commented that "a good cast is all that saves this weakly scripted effort".

In British Sound Films: The Studio Years 1928–1959 David Quinlan rated the film as "average", writing: "Stars and direction enliven cut-price, coincidence-stretching thriller."

According to Sky Movies, which also rated the film two out of five stars, "Vernon Sewell was both a competent and prolific director in the genre, and brings a professional crispness that many of his contemporaries lacked."
