= The Intimate Stranger (1956 film) =

1956 film by Joseph Losey

- Spanish poster for 1969 re-release.
- Directed by: Joseph Losey (Note: Fronted by producer Alec C. Snowden.)
- Written by: Howard E. Koch (Note: Credited as 'Peter Howard'.)
- Produced by: Alec C. Snowden
- Starring: Richard Basehart; Mary Murphy; Constance Cummings
- Cinematography: Gerald Gibbs
- Edited by: Geoffrey Muller
- Music by: Trevor Duncan
- Production companies: Anglo-Guild Productions; Merton Park Studios
- Distributed by: Anglo-Amalgamated Film Distributors (UK)
- Release date: June 1956 (UK)
- Running time: 95 minutes
- Country: United Kingdom
- Language: English
- Budget: $125,000

The Intimate Stranger (released in the United States as Finger of Guilt) is a 1956 British drama film noir directed by Joseph Losey from a screenplay by Howard Koch, and starring Richard Basehart, Mary Murphy, Constance Cummings and Roger Livesey. It is inspired by Losey and Koch's real-life experiences in the Hollywood blacklist, and follows a blacklisted filmmaker (Basehart) trying to rebuild his life in England.

== Plot ==
Reggie Wilson's Hollywood career as a film editor ended after he had an affair with his boss's wife. He then moved to England, became successful and married the daughter of a producer. They are both working on a new film called Eclipse. His new life is threatened when he starts receiving intimate letters from a woman. She reminds him of a relationship that they had some time ago, but he has no knowledge of it.

== Cast ==
- Richard Basehart as Reginald "Reggie" Wilson
- Mary Murphy as Evelyn Stewart
- Constance Cummings as Kay Wallace
- Roger Livesey as Ben Case
- Faith Brook as Lesley Wilson
- Mervyn Johns as Ernest Chaple
- Vernon Greeves as George Mearns
- André Mikhelson as Steve Vadney
- David Lodge as Police Sergeant Brown
- Basil Dignam as Dr Gray
- Grace Denbigh Russell as Mrs Lynton

Uncredited

- Joseph Losey as director
- Garfield Morgan as Waiter
- Marianne Stone as Miss Cedric

== Production ==
Director Joseph Losey, a communist who had been blacklisted in the United States and moved to the United Kingdom, was fronted by the film's producer Alec C. Snowden. On some prints, Losey is himself credited as director, albeit under the alias 'Joseph Walton' (derived from his middle name). The screenplay was written by fellow blacklistee Howard Koch, under the pseudonym 'Peter Howard'. Losey had previously made The Sleeping Tiger, likewise fronted, for the same company, Anglo Amalgamated. The movie was also made with the involvement of Todon Productions, the company of Donna Reed and husband Tony Owen.

The film, originally titled With All My Heart, was produced at Shepperton Studios, where filming began in November 1955. Another early title was Man Betrayed and Pay the Piper.

== Reception ==
The Monthly Film Bulletin wrote: "The plot of this melodrama is ingenious, and the problem of why the mysterious Evelyn has chosen to hound the innocent Reggie is sufficiently intriguing for the film to build up a fair degree of tension. The denouement, however, ends the story on a tame anti-climax. The direction is quite slick, although more might have been made of the studio backgrounds. Mary Murphy, as Evelyn, gives a nicely judged performance, and Richard Basehart is adequately harassed as her victim."

Kine Weekly wrote: "Richard Basehart contributes a thoroughly convincing performance as the harassed Reggie, Mary Murphy is both brash and attractive as Evelyn, Roger Livesey comfortably fits part of executive Ben, Faith Brook makes an appealing Lesley, and Constance Cumming and Mervyn Johns are more than adequate as direct support."

Variety wrote: "Finger of Guilt provides enough mystery to keep the spectator fairly engrossed during most of a well-developed unfoldment, but film's contrived climax is weak."

Allmovie wrote: "Perhaps Koch and his director Joseph Losey...were too drawn in to the plot's semi-metaphorical take on blacklisting to see that the scenes are not properly focused, the dialogue lacks enough sparkle and that the string of coincidences causes some plausibility problems. Fortunately, Finger is helped immensely by the on-target performance of leading man Richard Basehart and the beautifully wicked one of Mary Murphy, as well as the solid turn from Constance Cummings."

Derek Winnert wrote "It is one of the least well known of all Losey's films, but then it is arguably also one of the least too, though far from negligible."

Dennis Schwartz noted a "tightly scripted crime thriller...The conclusion comes with a pat resolution, but by that time I was engrossed in the improbable story and too much impressed with the fine acting to care that much if I was being manipulated."
