= Sport and Speed =

- Directed by: Ray Densham
- Written by: Ray Densham
- Produced by: Nat Cohen
- Starring: Eamonn Andrews
- Distributed by: Anglo-Amalgamated
- Release date: 1952
- Running time: 30 mins
- Country: United Kingdom
- Language: English

Sport and Speed is a 1952 British documentary directed by Ray Densham that features Eamonn Andrews as the narrator.

The short film captures the intensity and thrill of motor racing and motorcycle racing, focusing on the dangers and excitement of high-speed sports. Anglo-Amalgamated distributed it and offered a vintage look into motorsport culture in the early 1950s, showcasing racing scenes and the risks associated with these sports.
