= Street of Shadows (1953 film) =

1953 British film by Richard Vernon

- US theatrical release poster
- Directed by: Richard Vernon
- Written by: Richard Vernon
- Based on: The Creaking Chair by Laurence Meynell
- Produced by: William Nassour; William H. Williams executive Nat Cohen; Stuart Levy
- Starring: Cesar Romero; Kay Kendall; Victor Maddern; Simone Silva
- Cinematography: Phil Grindrod
- Edited by: Geoffrey Muller
- Music by: Eric Spear
- Production companies: William Nassour Productions; Merton Park Studios
- Distributed by: Anglo-Amalgamated Film Distributors
- Release date: April 1953 (UK)
- Running time: 84 minutes
- Country: United Kingdom
- Language: English

Street of Shadows, also known as Shadow Man, is a 1953 British film noir written and directed by Richard Vernon and starring Cesar Romero, Victor Maddern, Kay Kendall and Edward Underdown. It is based on the 1951 novel The Creaking Chair by Laurence Meynell.

== Plot ==
Luigi, the owner of a Soho pin table saloon, is romancing an unhappily married socialite, Barbara Gale. He is accused of the murder of his former girlfriend Angela, who was found stabbed in his apartment. He evades the police and asks his friend Limpy for help, but Limpy is revealed to be Angela's killer.

== Cast ==
- Cesar Romero as Luigi
- Kay Kendall as Barbara Gale
- Edward Underdown as Det. Insp. Johnstone
- Victor Maddern as Limpy
- Bill Travers as Nigel Langley
- Simone Silva as Angela Abbe
- Liam Gaffney as Constable Fred Roberts
- Robert Cawdron as Det. Sgt. Hadley
- John Penrose as Gerald Gale
- Molly Hamley-Clifford as "Starry" Darrell
- Eileen Way as Mrs. Thoms
- Paul Hardtmuth as J.M. Mayall
- Tony Sympson as Nikki
- Rose McLaren as Rose
- Michael Kelly as Merchant Seaman West
- Fred Griffiths as cab driver
- Harry Purvis as Darrell
- Lionel King as cardsharp

== Production ==
It was shot at the Merton Park Studios in London and on location in the city's West End. The film's sets were designed by the art director George Haslam. It was an early production of Anglo-Amalgamated who had signed a deal with Lippert Pictures who distributed the film in the United States. While much of the company's output at the time were second features, this was a more expensive film aimed at the first feature market. It was the first Anglo film to use an imported star.

== Critical reception ==
The Monthly Film Bulletin wrote: "A conventional thriller. The sound track is somewhat enlivened by Tommy Reilly's harmonica solos, particularly 'The Limping Man', which seems destined to share the fate of the 'Harry Lime Theme'."

Kine Weekly wrote: "Seamy side romantic crime melodrama, with pathological overtones. ... The picture, complete with harmonica accompaniment, makes a muddled start, but once romance between Luigi and Barbara is clearly established and the chip on Limpy's shoulder bared, the dizzy low-life kaleidoscope acquires human interest."

Variety wrote: "Typical British attention to characterization in bit parts is carried out in the film, but without any slowdown, as Richard Vernon's direction puts his script through its paces. The suspense element is well established by the direction and the mood of the piece is heightened by the harmonica eniphasis in the Eric Spear score and by the low-key, interestingly angled lensing of Phil Grindrod."
