= The Angel of Terror =

1922 novel by Edgar Wallace

- Author: Edgar Wallace
- Language: English
- Genre: Crime
- Publication date: 1922
- Publication place: United Kingdom
- Media type: Print

The Angel of Terror is a 1922 crime novel by the British writer Edgar Wallace.

== Adaptation ==
In 1963 it was turned into the film Ricochet directed by John Moxey as part of a long-running series of Wallace films made at Merton Park Studios.

== Bibliography ==
- Goble, Alan. The Complete Index to Literary Sources in Film. Walter de Gruyter, 1999.
