= The Strange Awakening =

1958 British film by Montgomery Tully

- Theatrical release poster
- Directed by: Montgomery Tully
- Screenplay by: J. McLaren Ross
- Based on: novel Puzzle for Fiends by Hugh Wheeler (as Patrick Quentin)
- Produced by: Alec C. Snowden
- Starring: Lex Barker; Carole Mathews; Lisa Gastoni; Peter Dyneley
- Cinematography: Philip Grindrod
- Edited by: Geoffrey Muller
- Music by: Richard Taylor
- Production company: Merton Park Studios
- Distributed by: Cinema Associates
- Release date: 13 April 1958 (UK)
- Running time: 79 minutes
- Country: United Kingdom
- Language: English

The Strange Awakening (U.S. title: Female Fiends) is a 1958 British second feature film directed by Montgomery Tully, starring Lex Barker and Carole Mathews. It was written by J. McLaren Ross based on the 1946 novel Puzzle for Fiends by Hugh Wheeler (as Patrick Quentin).

== Plot ==
Motoring in the South of France, Peter Chance picks up a hitchhiker, and is attacked and left unconscious. Awaking in a villa with no memory of his identity, he is told by a woman claiming to be his mother that he is the heir to a fortune. When police investigate the death of his "father" Chance becomes suspicious and starts to investigate.

== Cast ==
- Lex Barker as Peter Chance
- Carole Mathews as Selena Friend
- Lisa Gastoni as Marny Friend
- Nora Swinburne as Mrs. Friend
- Peter Dyneley as Dr. Rene Normand
- Joe Robinson as Sven
- Malou Pantera as Isabella
- Richard Molinas as Louis
- John Serret as Commissaire Sagain
- Stanley Maxted as Mr. Moffat
- Monica Grey as Iris Chance
- Yvonne Andre as nun
- Raf De La Torre as Mr. Petheridge

== Production ==
The film was known as The Puzzle.

== Critical reception ==
The Monthly Film Bulletin wrote: "A summary of the plot does not do justice to this gripping version of the amnesia theme. The modest production successfully creates an atmosphere and the acting, though unremarkable, is always competent. A good 'B' melodrama."

In British Sound Films: The Studio Years 1928–1959 David Quinlan rated the film as "good", writing: "Genuinely atmospheric suspense film."
