= Street of Shadows =

Street of Shadows may refer to:

- Street of Shadows (1937 film), a French film
- Street of Shadows (1953 film), a British film
- Street of Shadows (novel), a Star Wars novel
- "Street of Shadows" (The Twilight Zone), an episode of the 1985 television series The Twilight Zone
