= Little Red Monkey =

1955 British film by Ken Hughes

- Theatrical release poster
- Directed by: Ken Hughes
- Written by: James Eastwood; Ken Hughes
- Based on: story by Eric Maschwitz
- Produced by: Alec C. Snowden
- Starring: Richard Conte; Rona Anderson; Russell Napier; Sylva Langova
- Cinematography: Josef Ambor
- Edited by: Inman Hunter; Geoffrey Muller
- Music by: Trevor Duncan
- Production company: Merton Park Studios
- Distributed by: Anglo-Amalgamated Film Distributors
- Release date: 4 April 1955
- Running time: 71 minutes
- Country: United Kingdom
- Language: English

Little Red Monkey (U.S. title: The Case of the Red Monkey) is a 1955 British thriller film directed by Ken Hughes and starring Richard Conte, Rona Anderson and Russell Napier. The screenplay was by Hughes and James Eastwood, based on the 1953 BBC Television series of the same name written by Eric Maschwitz.

Detectives from Scotland Yard investigate a series of murders of leading nuclear scientists, and are intrigued by strange reports received about the crimes.

The film was an international hit, and along with Confession (1955) proved a breakthrough for Anglo-Amalgamated. After its success the company began making more expensive productions, often hiring American stars for international appeal.

== Cast ==
- Richard Conte as Bill Locklin
- Rona Anderson as Julia Jackson
- Russell Napier as Superintendent John Harrington
- Sylva Langova as Hilde Heller, chief spy
- Colin Gordon as Harry Martin, reporter
- Donald Bisset as Editor Harris
- John King-Kelly as spy henchman
- Bernard Rebel as Vinson, spy henchman
- Arnold Marlé as Professor Leon Dushenko
- John Horsley as Detective Sergeant Gibson
- Jane Welsh as Superintendent McCollum
- Theodore Wilhelm as Secretary of the International Social Club
- Colin Tapley as Sir Clive Raglan
- Noel Johnson as Detective Sergeant Hawkins
- Jessica Kearns as airport hostess
- Geoffrey Denys as Doctor Mayhew
- Gianfranco Parolini as Inspector May
- Guy Deghy as Social Club Recreation Director
- Peter Godsell as Tommy McCollum
- Ed Devereaux as American sailor
- George Margo as American sailor
- André Mikhelson as East German Chief of Border Guards
- Tony Sympson as cab driver

== Production ==
The film was made by Anglo-Amalgamated at Merton Park Studios, a co-production with Anglo Guild. The movie also had the involvement of Todon Productions, the company of Donna Reed and her husband Tony Owen.

== Critical reception ==
The Monthly Film Bulletin said: "Some efficient photography and editing eke out the meagre excitements".

Variety wrote: “Like many British-produced pictures, it lacks American-type pace and is a routine entry in the program market. Conte portrays a U.S. State Dept. officer ... but displays little of the dash and ingenuity such a part calls for."

In British Sound Films: The Studio Years 1928–1959 David Quinlan rated the film as “average” and wrote: “Conte and direction a cut above the rest in this moderately exciting thriller".

The Radio Times Guide to Films gave the film 3/5 stars, writing: "Ken Hughes honed his skills as a director of thrillers working on the Scotland Yard B-movie series. Consequently, this quota quickie has a great deal more substance and style than many of its contemporaries. ... Hughes keeps the action on the boil, while Russell Napier and Rona Anderson are fine as a Scotland Yard detective and his niece."
