= The Man Who Bought London =

The Man Who Bought London may refer to:

- The Man Who Bought London (novel), a 1915 crime novel by Edgar Wallace
- The Man Who Bought London (film), a 1916 British silent crime film based on the novel
