= The Man Who Bought London (novel) =

1915 novel

- Author: Edgar Wallace
- Language: English
- Genre: Crime
- Publisher: Ward Lock
- Publication date: 1915
- Publication place: United Kingdom
- Media type: Print

The Man Who Bought London is a 1915 crime novel by the British writer Edgar Wallace. It was originally published as a magazine serialisation.

An American, Kerry King, leads a syndicate of millionaires seeking to buy up large chunks of London in order to redevelop them for the benefit of the poorer inhabitants. However, his plan is threatened by the schemes of a former business partner, Hermann Zeberlieff.

== Film adaptation ==
It was adapted for a 1916 British silent film of the same title directed by Floyd Martin Thornton and starring Evelyn Boucher and Roy Travers. It was the first of many screen adaptations of Wallace's novels and stories.

The tale was adapted again under the title Time to Remember (1962), directed by Charles Jarrott. It was an entry in the Edgar Wallace Mysteries series of second features made at Merton Park Studios.

== Bibliography ==
- Bergfelder, Tim. International Adventures: German Popular Cinema and European Co-Productions in the 1960s. Berghahn Books, 2005.
- Clark, Neil. Stranger than Fiction: The Life of Edgar Wallace, the Man Who Created King Kong. The History Press, 2015.
- Goble, Alan. The Complete Index to Literary Sources in Film. Walter de Gruyter, 1999.
