= Maxine Audley =

English actress (1923–1992)

- Born: Maxine Hecht; 29 April 1923; London, England
- Died: 23 July 1992 (aged 69); Fulham, London, England
- Other name: Violet M. Hecht
- Occupation: Actress
- Years active: 1947–1992
- Spouses: Leonard Cassini (m. 1944): Andrew Broughton (dates unknown); Frederick Granville (m. 1954–1965) Leo Maguire (m. 1978)
- Children: 1

Maxine Audley (29 April 1923 – 23 July 1992) was an English theatre and film actress. She made her professional stage debut in July 1940 at the Open Air Theatre. Audley performed with the Old Vic company and the Royal Shakespeare Company many times. She appeared in more than 20 films, the first of which was the 1948 adaptation of Leo Tolstoy's novel Anna Karenina.

== Biography ==
Maxine Audley was born in London on 29 April 1923. Her parents were Henry Julius Hecht and Katherine Arkandy, a coloratura soprano. Audley attended the Westonbirt School in Gloucestershire. She trained for the stage at the Tamara Daykharhanova School in New York City and the London Mask Theatre School.

Audley was married four times, to the pianist Leonard Cassini, to company manager Andrew Broughton, to Frederick Granville the impresario, with whom she had a daughter, Deborah Jane, and to Glasgow born actor Leo Maguire 1938-1992 (not to be confused with Irish songwriter of the same name). Audley died in London on 23 July 1992.

== Stage work ==
Audley made her first professional stage appearance in July 1940 at the Open Air Theatre in a walk-on role in a production of A Midsummer Night's Dream. From 1940 to 1942, Audley performed with repertory companies in Tonbridge, Maidenhead and Birmingham. She again performed at the Open Air Theatre in 1942 and 1943, appearing in such roles as Nerissa in The Merchant of Venice and Hippolyta in A Midsummer Night's Dream. After the Second World War, Audley toured with the Old Vic company in Arms and the Man and made her West End theatre debut in the 1948 musical Carissima.

From 1948 to 1949, Audley performed in repertory theatre at the Nottingham Playhouse. The following year, she joined the company of what was then known as the Shakespeare Memorial Theatre, touring Germany in the roles of Goneril in King Lear, Mariana in Measure for Measure and Ursula in Much Ado About Nothing. Audley continued to work with this company throughout her career, appearing with them again for their 1955 and 1957 seasons. In the 1955 season, Audley appeared as Lady Macduff in Macbeth, a performance that was praised by Kenneth Tynan as having "exceptional power". Audley portrayed Tamora in the 1957 production of Titus Andronicus, a role that she would later list as one of her favourites, along with Amanda in Private Lives and Blanche du Bois in A Streetcar Named Desire. In 1960 she appeared at the Strand Theatre in Settled Out of Court.

In 1961, Audley joined the Old Vic company, appearing as Constance in King John at the Royal Lyceum Theatre and the Old Vic. The following year, she performed with the Royal Shakespeare Company at the Edinburgh Festival. Audley played the role of Marina, an aristocrat's concubine, in Iris Murdoch's play The Servants and the Snow (1970). She worked with the Royal Shakespeare Company again in 1977, playing Volumnia in Coriolanus in Stratford and at the Aldwych Theatre. Other venues at which Audley appeared included the Haymarket Theatre in 1963, the Palace Theatre, Watford in 1968 and the Warehouse Theatre in 1978.

== Film and TV work ==
Maxine Audley appeared in more than 20 films, her first appearance being in the 1948 adaptation of Anna Karenina. She then appeared in The Prince and the Showgirl, A King in New York (both 1957), The Vikings, Dunkirk (both 1958), Our Man in Havana (1959) and Peeping Tom (1960). Her other films include The Trials of Oscar Wilde (also 1960) as Ada Leverson, The Battle of the Villa Fiorita (1965), Here We Go Round the Mulberry Bush (1968), House of Cards (1968), Frankenstein Must Be Destroyed, Sinful Davey, The Looking Glass War (1970) and Running Scared (1972). Her television appearances included International Detective and Danger Man (1960), "The Edgar Wallace Mysteries" and "Man at the Carlton Tower" (1961), Great Expectations (1967), Mr. Rose (1967), The Adventures of Black Beauty (1972), Space: 1999 (1976) and the television miniseries adaptations of Zastrozzi, A Romance (1986) and A Ghost in Monte Carlo (1990).

== Filmography ==
Year	Title	Role	Notes
1948	Anna Karenina	Minor Role	Uncredited
1953	The Pleasure Garden	Lady Ennui	
1954	The Sleeping Tiger	Carol	
1957	The Barretts of Wimpole Street	Arabel Barrett	
1957	The Prince and the Showgirl	Lady Sunningdale	
1957	A King in New York	Queen Irene	
1958	Dunkirk	Diana Foreman	
1958	The Vikings	Enid	
1959	Our Man in Havana	Teresa	
1960	Bluebeard's Ten Honeymoons	Cynthia	
1960	Peeping Tom	Mrs. Stephens	
1960	Hell Is a City	Julia Martineau	
1960	The Trials of Oscar Wilde	Ada Leverson	
1961	Petticoat Pirates	Mary - Superintendent	
1961	Man at the Carlton Tower	Lydia Daney	Edgar Wallace Mysteries
1962	The Brain	Marion Fane	
1963	Ricochet	Yvonne Phipps	Edgar Wallace Mysteries
1964	A Jolly Bad Fellow	Clarinda Bowles-Ottery	
1964	Never Mention Murder	Liz Teasdale	Edgar Wallace Mysteries
1965	The Battle of the Villa Fiorita	Charmian	
1968	Here We Go Round the Mulberry Bush	Mrs. Beauchamp	
1968	House of Cards	Mathilde Rosier	
1969	Sinful Davey	Duchess of Argyll	
1969	Frankenstein Must Be Destroyed	Ella Brandt	
1970	The Looking Glass War	Mrs. Leclerc	
1972	Running Scared	Mrs. Betancourt	
