= Dívka v modrém =

1940 film by Otakar Vávra

- Directed by: Otakar Vávra
- Screenplay by: Otakar Vávra
- Story by: Felix de la Cámara
- Produced by: Jan Sinnreich
- Starring: Lída Baarová; Oldřich Nový
- Cinematography: Jan Roth
- Edited by: Antonín Zelenka
- Music by: Sláva Eman Nováček
- Production company: Lucernafilm
- Distributed by: Lucernafilm
- Release date: January 26, 1940
- Running time: 87 minutes
- Countries: Protectorate of Bohemia and Moravia
- Language: Czech

Dívka v modrém is a 1939 Czech comedy film directed by Otakar Vávra.

== Cast ==
- Lída Baarová as Vlasta/Countess Blanka of Blankenburg
- Oldřich Nový as Notary Jan Karas
- Růžena Šlemrová as Mrs. Smrčínská
- Sylva Langová as Slávinka Smrčínská
- Antonie Nedošinská as Housekeeper Otýlie
- Nataša Gollová as Růženka Smutná
- Bedřich Veverka as Doctor Pacovský
- František Paul as Forester Pavel Čádek
- František Kreuzmann as Knight Argnan
- Jindřich Láznička as Clerk Houžvička
- Eliška Pleyová as Fashion salon owner
- Vladimír Majer as Castle warden Kylián
- Vladimír Řepa as Landowner Kabelka
- Josef Bělský as Count Landa
- Jiří Vondrovič as Pharmacist's son
- Bolek Prchal as Record keeper
- Eman Fiala as Professor
