= John Stoll =

British art director (1913–1990)

- Born: 13 December 1913; London, England, United Kingdom
- Died: 25 June 1990 (aged 76); United Kingdom
- Occupation: Art director
- Years active: 1947–1989

John Stoll (13 December 1913 – 25 June 1990) was a British art director. He won an Academy Award in the category Best Art Direction for the film Lawrence of Arabia. During the 1950s, he worked largely on low-budget British feature films.

== Selected filmography ==
- Glad Tidings (1953)
- Flannelfoot (1953)
- What Every Woman Wants (1954)
- The Sleeping Tiger (1954)
- The Crowded Day (1954)
- Radio Cab Murder (1954)
- The Green Carnation (1954)
- The Black Rider (1954)
- The Harassed Hero (1954)
- The Scarlet Web (1954)
- The Happiness of Three Women (1954)
- Where There's a Will (1955)
- Marilyn (1955)
- Keep It Clean (1956)
- Passport to Treason (1956)
- A Touch of the Sun (1956)
- No Road Back (1957)
- West of Suez (1957)
- That Woman Opposite (1957)
- The Camp on Blood Island (1958)
- A Cry from the Streets (1958)
- I Only Arsked! (1958)
- Light Up the Sky! (1960)
- Sword of Sherwood Forest (1960)
- The Greengage Summer (1961)
- Lawrence of Arabia (1962)
- The Running Man (1963)
- Lost Command (1966)
