= Kilmore (racehorse) =

Irish racehorse

- Sire: Zalophus
- Grandsire: Tetratema
- Dam: Brown Image
- Damsire: Ut Majeur
- Sex: Gelding
- Foaled: 1950
- Trainer: Ryan Price

Major wins
- Grand National (1962)

Kilmore (born 1950) was an Irish racehorse who won the 1962 Grand National. Kilmore was owned by movie executives Nat Cohen and Stuart Levy. Kilmore returned to the Grand National in 1963, finishing 6th.

== Grand National Record ==
Grand National	Position	Jockey	Age	Weight	SP	Distance
1962	1st	Fred Winter	12	10-4	28/1	10 lengths
1963	6th	Fred Winter	13	11-0	100/8	
