= 1962 Grand National =

English steeplechase horse race

- Grand National
- Location: Aintree Racecourse
- Date: 31 March 1962
- Winning horse: Kilmore
- Starting price: 28/1
- Jockey: (England) Fred Winter
- Trainer: (England) Ryan Price
- Owner: (England) Nat Cohen
- Conditions: Heavy

External videos
- BBC coverage in full
- Highlights of the 1962 Grand National (British Pathé)

The 1962 Grand National was the 116th renewal of the Grand National horse race that took place at Aintree Racecourse near Liverpool, England, on 31 March 1962.

The race was won by Kilmore, a 28/1 shot ridden by jockey Fred Winter. The 12-year-old horse was trained by Ryan Price. Wyndburgh was second, and Mr. What finished third. Thirty-two horses ran and all returned safely to the stables.

Kilmore was owned by movie executives Nat Cohen and Stuart Levy.

== Build Up ==
Seventy seven entries were received and published on January 5th 1962 with Cheltenham Gold Cup winner, Pas Seul topping the handicap ratings. Two former winners of the race, Merrymen II and Mr What were also entered, along with the defending champion, Nicolaus Silver and two entries, The Rip and Out of Town for Her Majesty the Queen. Only one entry, Cantina, from Ireland wasn't qualified to receive a handicap rating and would be allocated automatic top weight of 12 stones.

== Finishing order ==
Position	Name	Jockey	Age	Handicap (st-lb)	SP	Distance
01	Kilmore	Fred Winter	12	10-4	28/1	10 Lengths
02	Wyndburgh	Tommy Barnes	12	10-9	45/1	
03	Mr. What	Johnny Lehane	12	10-9	22/1	
04	Gay Navaree	Tony Cameron	10	10-0	100/1	
05	Fredith's Son	Francis Shortt	11	10-11	66/1	
06	Dark Venetian	Patrick Cowley	7	10-0	100/1	
07	Nicolaus Silver	Bobby Beasley	10	10-10	100/9	
08	Cannobie Lee	Eddie Harty	11	10-1	40/1	
09	Ernest	Alan Dufton	10	10-0	66/1	
10	Clover Bud	David Nicholson	12	10-4	100/1	
11	Blonde Warrior	Terry Biddlecombe	10	10-6	66/1	
12	Solfen	Toss Taaffe	10	11-2	9/1	
13	Merryman II	David Dick	11	11-8	20/1	
14	Colledge Master	Laurie Morgan	12	10-13	33/1	
15	Fortron	Robin Langley	9	10-0	100/1	
16	Politics	Dave Bassett	10	10-0	100/1	
17	Clear Profit	Tim Ryan	12	10-0	66/1	Last to Complete

== Non-finishers ==
Fence	Name	Jockey	Age	Handicap (st-lb)	SP	Fate
26	Superfine	Sir William Pigott-Brown	9	10-6	100/6	Fell
19	Team Spirit	Willie Robinson	10	10-6	22/1	Fell
01	Springbok	Pat Buckley	8	10-6	100/8	Fell
20	Kerforo	Pat Taaffe	8	10-3	100/9	Fell
19	Duplicator	George Milburn	9	10-2	28/1	Unseated Rider
11	Siracusa	Josh Gifford	9	10-0	33/1	Fell
21	Carraroe	William McLernon	10	10-0	66/1	Fell
26	Taxidermist	John Lawrence	10	10-10	20/1	Pulled Up
26	Chavra	Michael Scudamore	9	10-7	50/1	Pulled Up
22	Clipador	Paddy Farrell	11	10-4	66/1	Pulled Up
29	Vivant	Rex Hamey	9	10-0	100/6	Pulled Up
21	Melilla	Gordon Cramp	8	10-0	100/1	Pulled Up
19	Seas End	John Kempton	10	10-5	100/1	Unseated Rider [Remounted but immediately pulled up]
19	Frenchman's Cove	Stan Mellor	7	11-5	7/1	Brought Down
16	Dandy Tim	Roy Carter	9	10-0	50/1	Unseated Rider

== Media coverage ==
The BBC covered its third Grand National with David Coleman again at the helm on Grand National Grandstand. Peter O'Sullevan, Bob Haynes and Peter Montague-Evans provided the commentary.

== Quotes ==
"I can't understand why none of you [the newspaper tipsters] didn't tip him? After last year I knew he would win. I'm getting too old to enjoy these things." Winning jockey Fred Winter.

"I would nearly have won but he landed bang on top of the fourth fence out and it knocked all the steam out of him" Johnny Lehane, jockey of Mr What.

"He was cantering and wasn't so much brought down, as knocked over by a horse jumping across him. I think Team Spirit." Stan Mellor on the fate of Favourite, Frenchman's Cove.
