= Raf De La Torre =

British actor (1905–1975)

- Born: Rafael De La Torre; 15 February 1905; Paris, France
- Died: 15 July 1975 (aged 70); London, England
- Occupation: Actor
- Years active: 1951–1974

Rafael De La Torre (14 February 1905 – 15 July 1975) was a French-British actor.

== Biography ==
De La Torre was born in Paris to Spanish parents in 1905. Despite their similar surnames, he was not related to actress Frances de la Tour.

He appeared in the films The Pickwick Papers (1952), Italian Attaché in Penny Princess (1952), Filibert in Moulin Rouge (1952), the Chief Justice in The Golden Coach (1952), Wicked as They Come (1956), Mr Petheridge in The Strange Awakening (1958), Grave Robber in The Flesh and the Fiends (1960), Monsieur Le Guestier in There's a Girl in My Soup (1970), Charles, Cardinal of Lorraine in Mary, Queen of Scots (1971), and the King of Swobodia in S*P*Y*S (1974).

A member of the BBC Repertory Company, he played Mr Quelch in the television series Billy Bunter of Greyfriars School (1955). Other television roles included Durracq in The Count of Monte Cristo (1956), Ali in Ghost Squad (1963), Orator in Sergeant Cork (1964), Senior Judge in the Doctor Who serial The Keys of Marinus (1964), Belanger/Torres in The Troubleshooters (1969-1970), Count Guiccioli in Biography (1970), John Dee in Elizabeth R (1971), Prince Oblonsky in The Rivals of Sherlock Holmes (1971), and Etienne Le Blanc in The Regiment (1972).

Torre's stage appearances included Christ in The Just Vengeance (1946) by Dorothy L. Sayers, and in André Obey's play Frost at Midnight (1963) at the Hampstead Theatre Club.

He died on 15 July 1975 in London, aged 70.

== Filmography ==
Year	Title	Role	Notes
1952	Penny Princess	Italian Attache	Uncredited
1952	The Pickwick Papers		Uncredited
1952	The Golden Coach	Le Procureur	
1952	Moulin Rouge	Filibert	Uncredited
1953	Epitaph for a Spy	Detective	TV series
1956	Guilty?	'Doctor'	
1956	Wicked as They Come		Uncredited
1958	The Strange Awakening	Mr. Petheridge	
1960	The Flesh and the Fiends	Grave Robber	
1970	There's a Girl in My Soup	M. Le Guestier	
1971	Mary, Queen of Scots	Cardinal De Guise	
1974	S*P*Y*S	King of Swobodia	Uncredited, (final film role)
