= Guilty? (1956 film) =

1956 British film by Edmond T. Gréville

- Directed by: Edmond T. Gréville
- Screenplay by: Maurice J. Wilson
- Produced by: Charles A. Leeds
- Starring: Leslie Perrins; Hugh Morton; Andre Mikhelson
- Cinematography: Jacques Lemare
- Edited by: Jim Connock
- Production company: Gibraltar Films
- Release date: 1956
- Running time: 93 minutes
- Country: United Kingdom
- Language: English

Guilty? (also known as By Whose Hand and Je Plaide Non Coupable) is a 1956 British film directed by Edmond T. Gréville and starring Leslie Perrins, Hugh Morton and Andre Mikhelson. Maurice J. Wilson wrote it based on the 1951 novel Death Has Deep Roots by Michael Gilbert.

== Plot ==
Former French Resistance heroine Vicki Martin is on trial at the Old Bailey for murdering her ex-lover. Solicitor and amateur detective Nap Rumbold is convinced she is innocent and investigates. He unmasks a gang of counterfeiters and saves Vicki's life.

== Cast ==
- Leslie Perrins as Poynter
- Hugh Morton as Rumbold Senior
- Andre Mikhelson as Santos
- Raf De La Torre as 'doctor'
- Felix Clement as Maitre Gimelet
- Margo Lion as Madame Gimelet
- Lupovici as Valdi
- Michael Anthony as Julian Welles
- John Justin as Nap Rumbold
- Barbara Laage as Jacqueline Delbois
- Donald Wolfit as judge
- Stephen Murray as Summers
- Norman Wooland as Pelton
- Frank Villard as Pierre Lemaire
- Andree Debar as Vicki Martin
- Betty Stockfeld as Mrs Roper
- Sydney Tafler as Camino
- Russell Napier as Inspector Hobson
- Kynaston Reeves as Colonel Wright

== Reception ==
The Monthly Film Bulletin wrote: "The hero's hair-breadth escapes and surprising adventures rival any serial in exuberance; it is something of a relief when the action reverts to the more sober atmosphere of the Old Bailey (though even here there are some lively incidents). Admirers of Michael Gilbert's book are not likely to be disappointed, for the film is brisk and efficient on its own level. Nevertheless, some might find it odd to reflect that it is the work of the man who directed Remous."

Kine Weekly wrote: "Use of flashbacks impel it frequently to cross the Channel and the constant change of locale makes it slightly difficult to follow, but its keen sense of humour and thrills get it over. ... The picture certainly gets around, but several neat comedy touches subtly case the concentration demanded of its audience. John Justin turns in a gay swashbuckling performance as Nap, Barbara Laage is quite a girl as Jacqueline, and Andree Debar Shee convinces as the tormented Vicki."

Leslie Halliwell wrote, "Solidly cast old-fashioned mystery with a courtroom climax."

In British Sound Films: The Studio Years 1928–1959, David Quinlan rated the film as "average", writing: "Plot is not too hot, but thriller is at least lively, well-acted."
