= Stoughton Barracks =

Military installation in Surrey, England

- Guildford
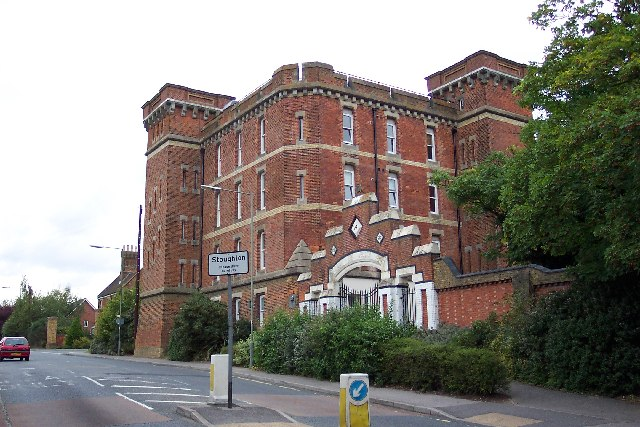
- Stoughton Barracks

Site information
- Type: Barracks
- Owner: Ministry of Defence
- Operator: British Army

Location
- Location within Surrey
- Coordinates: 51°15′19″N 00°35′29″W

Site history
- Built: 1876
- Built for: War Office
- In use: 1876–1983

Garrison information
- Occupants: Queen's Royal (West Surrey) Regiment

Stoughton Barracks was a military installation at Guildford in Surrey.

== History ==
The barracks were built in the Fortress Gothic Revival Style and completed in 1876. Their creation took place as part of the Cardwell Reforms which encouraged the localisation of British military forces. The barracks became the depot for the two battalions of the 2nd (West Surrey) Regiment of Foot. Following the Childers Reforms, the regiment evolved to become the Queen's Royal Regiment (West Surrey) with its depot in the barracks in 1881.

The barracks were used as an army recruiting centre during the First World War and as a reception and training centre for infantry recruits during the Second World War. In 1958 the barracks were used a location for the comedy film Carry On Sergeant. The barracks ceased to be a regimental depot in 1959 when the Queen's Royal Regiment (West Surrey) was amalgamated with the East Surrey Regiment, although the keep was still used as a pay office and a record office until 1983 when it was sold to Countryside Properties. The building is now known as "Cardwell's Keep".
