= The Year of Sir Ivor =

- Directed by: Kit Owens
- Distributed by: Anglo-Amalgamated
- Release date: 1969

The Year of Sir Ivor is a 1969 documentary about the racehorse Sir Ivor. It was distributed by Anglo-Amalgamated.
