= Sonia Holm =

British actress (1922–1974)

- Circa 1949
- Born: Dorothy Mary Sonia Freeborn; 24 February 1922; Sutton, Surrey, England
- Died: 2 July 1974 (aged 52); Oxford, Oxfordshire, England
- Occupation: Film actress
- Years active: 1947–1954
- Spouse: Patrick Holt (m. 1947; div. 1953)

Sonia Holm (24 February 1922 – 2 July 1974) was an English film actress. She trained at the Rank Organisation's "charm school".

== Death ==
Holm, who was known as Dorothy Parsons at the time, was found dead at her home in Oxford in July 1974.

An inquest heard that she died from asphyxia after inhaling vomit but, when recording an open verdict, coroner Dr Richard Whitehead suggested an irregular heartbeat or a sudden attack of epilepsy may have contributed to her death.

== Filmography ==
- The Loves of Joanna Godden (1947)
- When the Bough Breaks (1947)
- Miranda (1948)
- Broken Journey (1948)
- The Calendar (1948)
- Warning to Wantons (1949)
- The Bad Lord Byron (1949)
- Stop Press Girl (1949)
- 13 East Street (1952)
- The Crowded Day (1954)
- Radio Cab Murder (1954)
