= Harry Towb =

Northern Irish actor (1925–2009)

- Born: 27 July 1925; Larne, County Antrim, Northern Ireland
- Died: 24 July 2009 (aged 83); London, England
- Occupations: Actor, singer
- Years active: 1950–2009
- Spouse: Diana Hoddinott (m. 1965)
- Children: 3

Harry Towb (27 July 1925 – 24 July 2009) was an actor and singer from Northern Ireland.

== Early life and education ==
Towb was born in Larne, County Antrim, to a Russian-Jewish father and an Irish-Jewish mother; he once joked he was the only Jew ever born in Larne. After his parents divorced, he moved with his mother and sister to north Belfast, where he attended the Finiston School and Technical College.

He enlisted in the British Army during World War II and managed a military canteen, but was discharged once it emerged that he had lied about his age.

== Career ==
=== Theatre ===
He then appeared on stage with a touring theatre company in Ireland, and in repertory theatre in England. His first London appearance was in 1950 in The Gentle Gunman. After a number of years with the Royal Shakespeare Company, he joined the Royal National Theatre company in 1979, first playing Charley in Death of a Salesman. There, in 1982, he appeared in Richard Eyre's productions of The Beggar's Opera, Guys and Dolls, and Bertolt Brecht's Schweyk in the Second World War, as well as The Prince of Homburg, directed by John Burgess.

Towb regularly appeared in musical theatre including a role in the musical adaptation of Bar Mitzvah Boy. He performed in the 1983 original London production of the hit stage musical Little Shop of Horrors, based on Roger Corman's low-budget horror movie, which starred the original American lead Ellen Greene. In 1989, he appeared in a London revival of the musical Anything Goes opposite Elaine Paige and Bernard Cribbins. He also appeared in A Funny Thing Happened on the Way to the Forum at the National Theatre in 2004.

=== Television ===
He was a cast member of ITV's first comedy, The Army Game (1957–1961). He made numerous appearances on UK television, including popular series Callan, the Ronald Howard-led Sherlock Holmes, The Avengers, Home James!, Casualty, The Bill, Minder, Crown Court, Doctor Who, The Saint, and Heartbeat.

Harry Towb was also a regular presenter on the BBC Schools' programme You and Me, featuring with Cosmo and Dibs. In the late 1970s, Towb appeared in a series of TV commercials advertising Younger's Tartan Special beer, which were shown on heavy rotation in Scotland.

=== Film ===
His film appearances include Above Us the Waves (1955), The Blue Max (1966), Prudence and the Pill (1968), Patton (1970) and Lamb (1985). In December 2008, Towb appeared in two episodes of the BBC soap opera EastEnders as David, Janine Butcher's fiancé. He also appeared on the long-running BBC music hall show, The Good Old Days.

=== Radio ===
In 1959 he appeared in a radio episode of Hancock's Half Hour, "Fred's Pie Stall".

== Personal life ==
Towb was married to the actress Diana Hoddinott, with whom he had three children.

Throughout his adult life, he strongly identified with his Jewish background, and in 1983 he wrote and presented a TV documentary, Odd Men In, about Belfast's Jewish community. He would describe his interview with Belfast-born Chaim Herzog for this documentary as his proudest moment.

=== Death ===
Towb died at his home in London in 2009 from complications due to cancer. As his obituary in The Times said, "Asked, once, why he had become an actor, Harry Towb said it was because he had always wanted to be someone else." His "being fascinated by others... made him one of the finest character actors of his day", The Times continued. Towb, said one critic, "can be relied upon to add distinction to any production".

== Selected filmography ==
- The Quiet Woman (1951) – Jim Cranshaw
- Gift Horse (1952) – minor role (uncredited)
- 13 East Street (1952) – Ray
- Escape Route (1952) – Immigration Officer (uncredited)
- Escape by Night (1953) – Reporter (uncredited)
- Knave of Hearts (1954) – Stewart (uncredited)
- John Wesley (1954) – Michael O'Rory
- The Sleeping Tiger (1954) – Harry, second criminal
- A Prize of Gold (1955) – Benny
- Above Us the Waves (1955) – McCleery
- The Time of His Life (1955) – Steele
- Doublecross (1956) – Publican
- The March Hare (1956) – P.C. Dooney (uncredited)
- Eyewitness (1956) – Sugdon
- Circus Friends (1956) – Larry
- Stranger in Town (1957) – Café Attendant
- The End of the Line (1957) – Vince
- Murder at Site 3 (1958) – Kenney
- Dial 999 (TV series, 'Rolling Racketeers' episode) – Harry
- The 39 Steps (1959) – Harold (uncredited)
- Crossroads to Crime (1960) – Paddy
- All Night Long (1962) – Phales
- The Scarlet Blade (1963) – Cobb (uncredited)
- The Blue Max (1966) – Kettering
- 30 Is a Dangerous Age, Cynthia (1968) – Mr. Woolley
- Prudence and the Pill (1968) – Racetrack Official
- The Bliss of Mrs. Blossom (1968) – Doctor
- All Neat in Black Stockings (1968) – Issur
- The Mind of Mr. J.G. Reeder, (TV. episode) – (1969–1971) – Lew Kassio
- Patton (1970) – American GI Cook (uncredited)
- Carry On at Your Convenience (1971) – Doctor in Film
- Some Kind of Hero (1972) – Mannie Greenbaum
- Digby, the Biggest Dog in the World (1973) – Ringmaster
- The Girl from Petrovka (1974) – American Reporter
- The Bunny Caper (aka Sex Play) (1974) – Four Star General
- Barry Lyndon (1975) – Innkeeper
- Rosie Dixon – Night Nurse (1978) – Mr. Phillips
- Lassiter (1984) – Roger Boardman
- Lamb (1985) – Priest
- Stowaways on the Ark (1988) – Noah
- Moll Flanders (1996) – Magistrate
- The Most Fertile Man in Ireland (2000) – Uncle Eugene
- Conspiracy of Silence (2003) – Father Doherty
- Cheeky (2003) – Mr. Oates
