= Alec C. Snowden =

British film producer (1901–1983)

Alec Crawford Snowden (1901–1983) was a British film producer.

He was the son of Agnes Adamson Wallace née Crawford and the novelist J. Keighley Snowden.

== Selected filmography ==
- Little Red Monkey (1955)
- The Brain Machine (1955)
- Confession (1955)
- The Intimate Stranger (1956) - credited instead of Joseph Losey who actually directed
- The Key Man (1957)
- This Other Eden (1959)

Snowden also produced some early episodes of the Scotland Yard film series.
