= Carry On Sergeant =

1958 British comedy film by Gerald Thomas

- Original UK quad poster
- Directed by: Gerald Thomas
- Written by: Norman Hudis
- Produced by: Peter Rogers; Kenneth Myers
- Starring: William Hartnell; Bob Monkhouse; Shirley Eaton; Eric Barker; Dora Bryan; Bill Owen; Kenneth Connor; Charles Hawtrey; Kenneth Williams; Terence Longdon; Norman Rossington; Hattie Jacques; Gerald Campion
- Cinematography: Peter Hennessy
- Edited by: Peter Boita
- Music by: Bruce Montgomery
- Production company: Peter Rogers Productions
- Distributed by: Anglo-Amalgamated
- Release date: 31 August 1958
- Running time: 84 minutes
- Country: United Kingdom
- Language: English
- Budget: £73,000
- Box office: £500,000 (UK)

Carry On Sergeant is a 1958 British comedy film about national service starring William Hartnell, Bob Monkhouse and Eric Barker; it is the first in the series of Carry On films, with 31 entries released from 1958 to 1992. The film was based on a play The Bull Boys by R. F. Delderfield and was adapted into a script by Norman Hudis with John Antrobus contributing additional material and replacing the conscripted ballet dancers of the novel with a married couple. It was directed by Gerald Thomas and produced by Peter Rogers, a partnership which would last until 1978. Actors in this film, who went on to be part of the regular team in the series, were Kenneth Williams, Charles Hawtrey, Hattie Jacques, Kenneth Connor and Terry Scott. The film was followed by Carry On Nurse (1959).

== Release ==
This successful first film was screened to the trade and cinema-bookers on 1 August 1958 after which some regional screenings were held from 31 August including Aberdeen and Birmingham. It was not until 19 September 1958 that it received its London cinema release at the Plaza, and then the film rolled out nationwide on general release from 20 September onwards.

== Carry On series ==
Carry On Sergeant had not been conceived as the start of a film series; only after the film's surprising success did the producer Peter Rogers and the director Gerald Thomas set about planning a further project. After reusing the Carry On prefix and some cast members in their next project Carry On Nurse (1959) and having success with that film, the Carry On series of films evolved. The term "Carry on" is typically issued by an officer to an NCO when handing over control of a parade or inspection.

== Plot ==
Newly married Mary Sage is distraught when her husband Charlie receives his call-up papers during their wedding breakfast. He travels to Heathercrest National Service Depot, meeting fellow recruit Horace Strong, a chronic hypochondriac who is devastated at having been passed as fit.

The new recruits are assigned to Sergeant Grimshaw. Grimshaw will soon be retiring from the army and takes on a £50 bet with Sergeant O'Brien that his last bunch of squaddies will be his first champion platoon.

With beady-eyed inspection from Captain Potts and disgruntled support from Corporal Copping, Grimshaw decides to use some psychology and treat his charges kindly rather than simply shouting at them. But basic training does not start well and he struggles to take his platoon through it. They include failure Herbert Brown, upper-class cad Miles Heywood, rock 'n' roller Andy Galloway, delicate flower Peter Golightly and supercilious university graduate James Bailey. His attempts seem doomed.

Mary is determined to spend her wedding night with her husband and smuggles herself into the depot to get a job in the NAAFI, a situation Charlie is eventually able to legitimise. Strong spends most of his time complaining to the Medical Officer, Captain Clark. It is only the adoration of doe-eyed NAAFI girl Norah, which he initially rejects, that makes him realise his potential and inspires him to become a real soldier.

On the eve of the final tests, Grimshaw is in despair, but his squad overhears him bemoaning his lot to Copping. The squad decides to win the best platoon prize at all costs. On the day, they indeed beat the other platoons at all tasks and Grimshaw is awarded the cup for best platoon. On Grimshaw's last day, the men present him with a cigarette lighter as a retirement present and to say thank you.

== Cast ==
- William Hartnell as Sergeant Grimshaw
- Bob Monkhouse as Private Charlie Sage
- Shirley Eaton as Mary Sage
- Eric Barker as Captain Potts
- Dora Bryan as Norah
- Bill Owen as Corporal Copping
- Charles Hawtrey as Private Peter Golightly
- Kenneth Connor as Private Horace Strong
- Kenneth Williams as Private James Bailey
- Terence Longdon as Private Miles Heywood
- Norman Rossington as Herbert Brown
- Gerald Campion as Private Andy Galloway
- Hattie Jacques as Captain Clark, R.A.M.C.
- Cyril Chamberlain as Bren Gun instructor
- Arnold Diamond as Fifth Specialist
- Gordon Tanner as First Specialist
- Martin Boddey as Sixth Specialist
- Frank Forsyth as Second Specialist
- Ian Whittaker as Medical Corporal
- Basil Dignam as Third Specialist
- Anthony Sagar as Stores Sergeant
- Alec Bregonzi as First Storesman
- Terry Scott as Sergeant Paddy O'Brien
- Edward Judd as 5th Storeman
- Edward Devereaux as Sergeant Russell
- Bernard Kay as Injured Recruit
- Jack Smethurst as First Recruit
- Brian Jackson as Second Recruit
- Henry Livings as Twelfth Recruit
- Derek Martinus as Recruit
- James Villiers as Seventh Recruit
- Michael Hunt as Fourteenth Recruit
- Martin Wyldeck as Mr Sage (uncredited)
- Helen Goss as Mary's mother (uncredited)

== Production ==
=== Development ===
In 1955, film producer Sydney Box approached author R. F. Delderfield to write a screenplay about National Service in the United Kingdom. The project was shelved until 1957 with Delderfield planning to write the screenplay of an ensemble cast film with the working title of The Bull Boys. Delderfield's planned screenplay was to have been "one third laughter, one third documentary one third exciting incident leading up to the climax" with the virtues of National Service shown as giving the young men "pride in their regiment and uniform", similar to Carol Reed's 1944 film The Way Ahead.

Events overtook the film producers when the War Office White Paper of 1957 recommended the end of National Service. Box approached his brother-in-law Peter Rogers then the head of Beaconsfield Film Studios with the pair agreeing that the route to take was making fun of National Service, particularly due to the success of the 1956 Boulting brothers film Private's Progress and the 1957-1962 television series The Army Game.

Rogers had had difficulty sourcing a screenwriter, being rejected by Eric Sykes, Spike Milligan, Ray Galton, and Alan Simpson. Alfred Shaughnessy says Rogers offered him the chance of directing the script if he rewrote it but Shaughnessy turned it down as it was "not my cup of tea".

John Antrobus wrote an early draft, of which some scenes survive in the final film. Then Rogers collaborated with Norman Hudis who wrote the final script. Hudis felt his main contribution to the series was changing the story so the soldiers rallied around to help their sergeant win his bet. According to Hudis, "This set the style, to a great extent, of the ones I wrote: the incompetent, the uninterested or the plain unlucky, seen at their worst for most of the story, but triumphing in the end, against all expectation, and to rousing effect." The only part of the original novel that remained was the opening scene where a groom is called up on his wedding day.

The movie was financed by Nat Cohen and Stuart Levy at Anglo-Amalgamated who had enjoyed a big success with The Tommy Steele Story also made by Rogers and Hudis.

=== Shooting ===
Filming started 24 March 1958 on a budget of £80,000. Unlike their disapproval of Private's Progress, the War Office provided assistance to the film makers by providing a Company Sergeant Major to the film. Sequences were shot at Stoughton Barracks the then-home of the Queen's Royal Regiment (West Surrey), and Pinewood Studios.

Shirley Eaton, the female lead, had been in a number of comedies around this time.

Stuart Levy the co-producer of Anglo-Amalgamated wasn't keen on the title of The Bull Boys. Inspired by the success of another studio's 1957 film Carry On Admiral, suggested the new title of the film. Delderfield's script that involved a male ballet troupe being conscripted was turned into a play.

== Soundtrack ==
Composer Bruce Montgomery wrote the entire score to be played by a military band. The score was played by the Band of the Coldstream Guards.

== Title ==
"Carry on, Sergeant" is a normal expression for an Army officer to use; the American equivalent is, "As you were." (in British English 'As you were' is a military command to withdraw an order i.e. to return to the previous position). The title that replaced The Bull Boys was suggested by Stuart Levy to cash in on the popularity of the 1957 film Carry On Admiral, which was written by Val Guest. At the time, the success of Carry On Sergeant prompted applause and audience laughter in serious settings where the phrase was used, including amongst audiences of the film The Devil's Disciple (1959).

== Box office ==
- Budget – £73,000 (estimated)
- Gross – £500,000 (UK)
- Modern Budget Equivalent: £1.5M
- Modern Gross Equivalent: £10.7M

The film was the third most successful movie at the British box office in 1958.

Kinematograph Weekly listed it as being "in the money" at the British box office in 1958. The same magazine said Anglo Amalgamated pulled out "a staggering long shot" with the film and called it "the surprise smash hit of the year."

== Filming and locations ==
- Filming dates – 24 March 1958 – 2 May 1958

Interiors:

- Stage B, Pinewood Studios, Buckinghamshire

Exteriors:

- Army camp: Cardwell's Keep, Stoughton Barracks, Stoughton Road, Stoughton near Guildford, Surrey
- Wedding scene: St Mary's Church of England, Church Hill, Harefield, Middlesex
- Church scenes: Beaconsfield, Buckinghamshire

== Critical reception ==
Variety summarised Carry On Sergeant as a "Corny but mostly very funny Army farce that will click in U.K. provinces, and is not designed for any other type of audience" adding, "A bunch of talented character comedians have been handed these situations and, in their respective styles, they wring a lot more out of them and the dialog than the writers provide." The Monthly Film Bulletin called it "a traditionally English mixture of old farcical situations, well-worn jokes, and comic postcard characters. Charles Hawtrey, as a weedy incompetent, and Kenneth Williams, as a condescending intellectual, provide some genuine laughs. The rest of the humour is either overdone or half-baked".

== Bibliography ==
- Davidson, Andy (2012). Carry On Confidential. London: Miwk. ISBN 978-1-908630-01-8.
- Sheridan, Simon (2011). Keeping the British End Up – Four Decades of Saucy Cinema. London: Titan Books. ISBN 978-0-85768-279-6.
- Webber, Richard (2009). 50 Years of Carry On. London: Arrow. ISBN 978-0-09-949007-4.
- Hudis, Norman (2008). No Laughing Matter. London: Apex. ISBN 978-1-906358-15-0.
- Keeping the British End Up: Four Decades of Saucy Cinema by Simon Sheridan (third edition) (2007) (Reynolds & Hearn Books)
- Ross, Robert (2002). The Carry On Companion. London: Batsford. ISBN 978-0-7134-8771-8.
- Bright, Morris; Ross, Robert (2000). Mr Carry On – The Life & Work of Peter Rogers. London: BBC Books. ISBN 978-0-563-55183-6.
- Rigelsford, Adrian (1996). Carry On Laughing – a celebration. London: Virgin. ISBN 1-85227-554-5.
- Hibbin, Sally & Nina (1988). What a Carry On. London: Hamlyn. ISBN 978-0-600-55819-4.
- Eastaugh, Kenneth (1978). The Carry On Book. London: David & Charles. ISBN 978-0-7153-7403-0.
