= The Sleeping Tiger =

1954 film by Joseph Losey

- Theatrical release poster
- Directed by: Joseph Losey (Note: Initially fronted by Victor Hanbury.)
- Screenplay by: Harold Buchman; Carl Foreman
- Based on: The Sleeping Tiger by Maurice Moiseiwitsch
- Produced by: Victor Hanbury
- Starring: Alexis Smith; Alexander Knox; Dirk Bogarde
- Cinematography: Harry Waxman
- Edited by: Reginald Mills
- Music by: Malcolm Arnold
- Production companies: Insignia Films; Dorast Pictures
- Distributed by: Anglo-Amalgamated Film Distributors
- Release date: 21 June 1954 (London)
- Running time: 89 minutes
- Country: United Kingdom
- Language: English
- Budget: $300,000

The Sleeping Tiger is a 1954 British film noir directed by Joseph Losey, from a screenplay by Harold Buchman and Carl Foreman, and starring Alexis Smith, Dirk Bogarde and Alexander Knox. It was Losey's first British feature, which he directed under the fronting of producer Victor Hanbury, due to being blacklisted in the McCarthy Era. The film is about a petty thief (Bogarde) who agrees to be the test subject of an affluent psychiatrist (Knox), but the doctor's wife (Smith) becomes infatuated with him.

The film was released in the United Kingdom by Anglo-Amalgamated on 21 June 1954. It was a commercial success.

== Plot ==
Two criminals are stalking the streets of London one dark night. Frank Clemmons, a cocky young middle-class man, uses a gun to hold up psychiatrist Dr Clive Esmond outside Esmond's affluent home, but the doctor overpowers Clemmons.

Arriving home from Paris, Esmond's wife Glenda is taken aback to discover Clemmons staying in their home as a household guest. To avoid being turned over to the police, Clemmons has agreed to stay, acting as a human guinea-pig subject to Esmond's psychoanalysis, which aims to release him from his criminal recidivism. Glenda has reservations about Clemmons and behaves in a cold, aloof manner towards him.

Clemmons undergoes regular analysis with Esmond, who is determined to get to the root of his criminality. In between these sessions, he goes riding with Glenda. Although at first indifferent to him, she soon finds herself growing attracted to him. With a fellow criminal in town, Clemmons leaves the house one night and steals some jewellery. A police inspector later interviews him about the crime, but he denies having committed it. After a while, Clemmons takes Glenda to a nightclub in Soho, where her conflicted attraction to him deepens. The next day, Glenda admonishes Clemmons for his violent behaviour towards a house-maid, Sally, but their argument ends with a passionate clinch which indicates the beginning of an affair between them.

Initially oblivious, Esmond eventually finds his wife in a compromising position with Clemmons. Glenda's ambivalent feelings plague her. Back at the nightclub with Clemmons, he tosses a careless remark Glenda's way and this overwhelms her. As they begin their journey home, she drives recklessly. A police car pursues them, but they manage to escape it.

Sally's fiancé pays Esmond a visit to complain about the abuse she has had to endure from Clemmons and threatens to tell the police. No charges are pressed and Clemmons finds out that this is due to Esmond buying the man off with £100. He reacts by carrying out another robbery. When questioned by the police, Esmond ends up lying on behalf of Clemmons. A cunning ploy, this results in Clemmons pouring out a dramatic account of his tyrannical father, whom he deeply despised. As a boy, Clemmons stole and his father consequently turned him in to the authorities. Frank vowed revenge on his father when he was released, but was then given a beating. His father died shortly thereafter, and his mother blamed him. Clemmons admits that he prayed for his father's death and has seen himself as worthy of punishment ever since. Esmond concludes that since his father's death, Clemmons has had to provide his own punishment for the rest of his life.

Esmond soon begins acting like a father figure towards Clemmons. The two enjoy carefree activities together; Glenda grows intensely jealous. She asks Clemmons to elope with her. However, with Esmond's psychiatric experiment over and his patterns of behaviour understood, Clemmons decides to turn himself in to the police. Glenda hysterically rushes to Esmond, claiming that Clemmons has assaulted her. Esmond goes upstairs with a gun. A shot is heard and Esmond returns claiming that he has killed Clemmons. Glenda is heartbroken and ends up declaring her love for Clemmons. She then finds out that although there was a gunshot, Clemmons had not been in the room, he had already left. She goes after him in her car and comes upon him walking. She tells him to get into the car. He does and she subsequently drives off high speed. Highly distressed, Glenda swerves to avoid a lorry, but crashes the car. Clemmons survives, but Glenda dies in the wreckage.

== Cast ==
- Dirk Bogarde as Frank Clemmons
- Alexis Smith as Glenda Esmond
- Alexander Knox as Dr. Clive Esmond
- Hugh Griffith as Police Inspector
- Patricia McCarron as Sally Foster
- Maxine Audley as Carol
- Glyn Houston as Bailey

Uncredited

- Harry Towb as Harry, second criminal
- Russell Waters as Manager of Pearce & Mann
- Billie Whitelaw as Receptionist at Pearce & Mann
- Fred Griffiths as Cab driver
- Esma Cannon as Cleaner with ladder

== Production ==
Due to his alleged ties with the US Communist Party, the blacklisted Joseph Losey moved to London and began work on The Sleeping Tiger, his first British feature film. Despite being in England, he faced more problems. The British director Victor Hanbury, who had not directed a film since Hotel Reserve in 1944, allowed Losey to use Hanbury's name as an alias. Hanbury's actual role was limited to producing. The script was written by fellow American blacklistees Harold Buchman and Carl Foreman, who used the joint pseudonym 'Derek Frye'.

Alexis Smith and Alexander Knox, both successful Hollywood stars, were fearful of how appearing in Losey's film would affect their Hollywood careers. While Smith's career was largely unaffected, Knox chose to settle in Great Britain permanently shortly thereafter, and became one of Losey's regular collaborators.

The Sleeping Tiger was also the beginning of Losey's partnership with Dirk Bogarde, whom he later directed in The Servant, King & Country, Modesty Blaise and Accident, and with editor Reginald Mills who edited The Servant and King & Country.

The film was shot at Walton Studios and on location in London. The sets were designed by the art director John Stoll.

== Reception ==
=== Box office ===
According to Kinematograph Weekly the film was a "money maker" at the British box office in 1954.

=== Critical response ===
In a retrospective review for Screenonline, Neil Sinyard writes "The stylistic and thematic characteristics of Losey's later British films - the virtuoso camerawork, the insights on class and hypocrisy, the love-hate relationships at the core of the narratives - are all present here in a crude but exciting form. It is finely acted by all the principals, and the experience of working together here forged a bond between and that was to flower in the 1960s into one of British cinema's most important actor/director partnerships."
