= Edgar Wallace Mysteries =

British film series 1960–1965

Title sequence

The Edgar Wallace Mysteries is a British second-feature film series mainly produced at Merton Park Studios for Anglo-Amalgamated. There were 48 films in the series, which were released between 1960 and 1965. The series was screened as The Edgar Wallace Mystery Theatre on television in the United States.

== Synopsis ==
Producers Nat Cohen and Stuart Levy acquired the film rights to all of Edgar Wallace's books and stories in 1960.

The original intent was that 30 of the films would be produced by Independent Artists at Beaconsfield Studios while a further 20 would be made by the Film Producers Guild at Merton Park Studios.

In the event, Independent Artists' only contribution to the series would be The Malpas Mystery (1960) while more than double the intended 20 were made at Merton Park. The resulting adaptations were loose, with very few using Wallace's original titles. Like the concurrent Rialto Film series then being produced in Germany (see German krimis), there was no attempt to set them in the period settings of Wallace's original stories, probably to eliminate the need for elaborate costumes and sets. A 1962 article in Scene magazine quotes £22,000 as the budget for an episode in production at the time of reporting. The majority of the films played as supporting features on the ABC Cinemas circuit, which was Anglo-Amalgamated's usual outlet; but ten of them were allocated to the rival Rank circuit, with screenings in their Odeon and Gaumont cinemas.

Most of the series featured a standard title sequence, in which a shadowed bust of Edgar Wallace revolves slowly against a backdrop of swirling mist, to the accompaniment of the "Man of Mystery" theme written by Michael Carr. "Man of Mystery" was later recorded by The Shadows and became a number 5 hit record in the UK. Later episodes of the series used a speeded up version of the title music after the Shadows' cover version.

The film Violent Moment (1959), was later released with the Wallace Mysteries' credits replacing the originals, even though it was not part of the series. According to Kim Newman, insufficient episodes were available for American television, for the series was still in production; hence, the distributor Anglo-Amalgamated attached the "Wallace Mysteries" credits to some of its other mystery and crime films, such as House of Mystery (1961), and thereby expanded the series.

The series has been shown on television. In Britain, it was shown by ITV in 1968 under the title Tales of Edgar Wallace. Later, Channel 4 and Bravo rescreened the films through to the 1990s, later being re-shown on Talking Pictures TV from 2018. It was shown on American television as The Edgar Wallace Mystery Theatre, with episodes cut to fit hour-long commercial TV slots.

In July 2012, Network DVD began to release the complete series on DVD, uncut and presented in its original aspect ratio.

== Films ==
- Urge to Kill (March 1960) – see note below
- Clue of the Twisted Candle (September 1960)
- The Malpas Mystery (October 1960) – Independent Artists production
- Marriage of Convenience (November 1960) – Rank release
- The Man Who Was Nobody (December 1960)
- Partners in Crime (February 1961) – Rank release
- The Clue of the New Pin (February 1961)
- The Fourth Square (June 1961)
- Man at the Carlton Tower (July 1961)
- Clue of the Silver Key (August 1961)
- Attempt to Kill (September 1961) – Rank release
- Man Detained (October 1961) – Rank release
- Never Back Losers (December 1961) – Rank release
- The Sinister Man (December 1961)
- Backfire! (February 1962) – Rank release
- Candidate for Murder (February 1962)
- Flat Two (February 1962)
- The Share Out (February 1962)
- Number Six (April 1962)
- Time to Remember (July 1962)
- Solo for Sparrow (September 1962)
- Playback (September 1962)
- Locker Sixty-Nine (September 1962)
- Death Trap (October 1962)
- The Set Up (January 1963)
- Incident at Midnight (January 1963)
- The £20,000 Kiss (January 1963) – Rank release
- On the Run (February 1963) – Rank release
- Return to Sender (March 1963)
- Ricochet (March 1963)
- The Double (April 1963)
- To Have and to Hold (July 1963)
- The Partner (September 1963)
- Accidental Death (November 1963)
- Five to One (December 1963)
- Downfall (January 1964)
- The Verdict (February 1964)
- We Shall See (April 1964)
- The Rivals (May 1964)
- Who Was Maddox? (June 1964)
- Face of a Stranger (September 1964)
- Act of Murder (September 1964)
- Never Mention Murder (November 1964) – Rank release
- The Main Chance (November 1964)
- Game for Three Losers (April 1965) – Rank release
- Change Partners (July 1965)
- Strangler's Web (August 1965)
- Dead Man's Chest (October 1965)

Urge to Kill (1960) does not appear to have been part of the original series of films produced at Merton Park. Other films not shot as part of the series, but subsequently included, are Crossroads to Crime (1960) and Seven Keys (1961).

== Critical reception ==
The Radio Times described the series as "Brit noir at its best, updating some of the author's stories to more contemporary settings and blending classic B-movie elements with a distinctly British feel."

== See also ==
- Films based on works by Edgar Wallace
