= Anglo-Amalgamated =

UK film production company

- Opening logo, from Carry On Cleo (1964)
- Industry: Film production Film distribution
- Founded: 1945
- Defunct: 1971
- Fate: Absorbed into EMI Films
- Successor: Anglo-EMI Film Distributors
- Headquarters: United Kingdom
- Key people: Nat Cohen; Stuart Levy
- Divisions: Anglo Amalgamated Film Distributors

Anglo-Amalgamated Productions was a British film production company, run by Nat Cohen and Stuart Levy, which operated from 1945 until roughly 1971 (after which it was absorbed into EMI Films). Low-budget and second features, often produced at Merton Park Studios, formed much of its output. It was the UK distributor of many films produced by American International Pictures (AIP), who distributed AA's films in the United States.

It is remembered for producing the first 12 Carry On films (all of which were produced at Pinewood Studios) and B-movie series such as The Scales of Justice, Scotland Yard and the Edgar Wallace Mysteries. It also produced the Michael Powell film Peeping Tom (1960) and such films as John Schlesinger's A Kind of Loving (1962) and Billy Liar (1963) and Ken Loach's Poor Cow (1967).

The company's distribution arrangement with American International Pictures led to the last two films in Roger Corman's series of films based on the works of Edgar Allan Poe, The Masque of the Red Death and The Tomb of Ligeia (both 1964), being joint productions made in the UK. AA's film distribution subsidiary was Anglo Amalgamated Film Distributors Ltd. Anglo had a film production arm called Insignia Films.

== History ==
Cohen and Levy were both cinema owners and Cohen sold some of his cinemas to Levy. They decided to go into business together as Anglo-Amalgamated. The company began as a distributor, putting out some Hal Roach re-issues and documentaries. They then signed a deal with American Leasing Corporation to distribute some American films in Britain.

In 1951, the company moved into production with Assassin for Hire. This was made at Merton Park Studios, starting a close relationship between those studios and Anglo.

Anglo Amalgamated expanded into more expensive features with The Sleeping Tiger, which also marked the beginning of a close relationship with producer Julian Wintle. The company had a huge hit with The Tommy Steele Story in 1957. Another profitable association was with producer Peter Rogers who made the Carry On films.

In 1959 Kinematograph Weekly wrote "Anglo is acknowledged as Britain’s largest independent distribution company, a success story which rates high even by spectacular Wardour Street standards." The magazine claimed this success was "based on two factors - an unfailing showmanlike flair for catching the public's eye and, just as important, a knack for surrounding themselves with people as enthusiastic as themselves... They have an approving eye for the ingenious; a snort of distaste for the precious." (The same article mentions that Anglo intended to make an expensive international movie about the D-Day landings but this does not appear to have happened.)

The year 1961 was the company's strongest to date.

In 1962, Associated British Picture Corporation (ABPC) purchased 50% of the shares of Anglo Amalgamated. In 1967 they took over 74%.

At its peak Anglo Amalgamated made a return of £3 million a year. After the company went into partnership with EMI Films it became "Anglo-EMI".

Its library is now owned by StudioCanal via Lumiere Pictures and Television.

== Selected credits ==
- Assassin for Hire (1951)
- Mystery Junction (1951)
- Ghost Ship (1952)
- Wide Boy (1952)
- The Floating Dutchman (1952)
- Street of Shadows (1953)
- Noose for a Lady (1953)
- Counterspy (1953)
- The Sleeping Tiger (1954)
- Dangerous Voyage (1954)
- Little Red Monkey (1955)
- Postmark for Danger (1955)
- Dial 999 (1955)
- Timeslip (1955)
- Confession (1955)
- The Brain Machine (1956)
- The Intimate Stranger (1956)
- Johnny, You're Wanted (1956)
- The Hypnotist (1957)
- Cat Girl (1957)
- The Counterfeit Plan (1957)
- The Flying Scot (1957)
- The Tommy Steele Story (1957)
- Man in the Shadow (1957)
- Carry on Sergeant (1958)
- The Duke Wore Jeans (1958)
- Escapement (1958)
- The Long Knife (1958)
- Carry On Nurse (1959)
- Horrors of the Black Museum (1959)
- Carry On Teacher (1959)
- Please Turn Over (1959)
- The Headless Ghost (1959)
- Watch Your Stern (1960)
- Crossroads to Crime (1960)
- Peeping Tom (1960)
- No Kidding (1960)
- Carry On Constable (1960)
- Circus of Horrors (1960)
- The Criminal (1960)
- Carry on Regardless (1961)
- Payroll (1961)
- Dentist on the Job (1961)
- The Frightened City (1961)
- Raising the Wind (1961)
- On the Fiddle (1961)
- Night of the Eagle (1962)
- A Kind of Loving (1962)
- Play It Cool (1962)
- Carry On Cruising (1962)
- Crooks Anonymous (1962)
- She'll Have to Go (1962)
- Twice Round the Daffodils (1962)
- Some People (1962)
- The Mind Benders (1963)
- Nurse on Wheels (1963)
- Unearthly Stranger (1963)
- Billy Liar (1963)
- The Iron Maiden (1963)
- Carry On Cabby (1963)
- Carry On Jack (1963)
- Gonks Go Beat (1964)
- Carry On Spying (1964)
- This Is My Street (1964)
- The Masque of the Red Death (co-produced with AIP, 1964)
- The Tomb of Ligeia (co-produced with AIP, 1964)
- Nothing But the Best (1964)
- Catch Us If You Can (1964)
- Carry On Cleo (1964)
- Three Hats for Lisa (1965)
- Game for Three Losers (1965)
- The Big Job (1965)
- Carry On Cowboy (1965)
- Invasion (1965)
- The Face of Fu Manchu (1965)
- Darling (1965)
- Carry On Screaming (1966)
- Our Man in Marrakesh (1966)
- The Brides of Fu Manchu (1966)
- Circus of Fear (1966)
- Triple Cross (1966)
- Five Golden Dragons (1967)
- The Vengeance of Fu Manchu (1967)
- Jules Verne's Rocket to the Moon (1967)
- The Million Eyes of Sumuru (1967)
- Poor Cow (1967)
- Eve (1968)
- Shalako (1968)
- The Blood of Fu Manchu (1968)
- All Neat in Black Stockings (1969)
- All the Way Up (1970)
- Spring and Port Wine (1970)
- Entertaining Mr. Sloane (1970)
- The 14 (1973)
