= Merton Park Studios =

British film production studio

- Interactive map of the Merton Park Studios area

General information
- Type: Film studios
- Location: 269 Kingston Road, Merton Park, London, United Kingdom
- Coordinates: 51.41161°N 0.20838°W
- Opened: 1929
- Closed: 1967
- Demolished: 1976
- Owner: Piprodia Entertainment, Nikhanj Films and Film Producers Guild (1940s)

Merton Park Studios, opened in 1929, was a British film production studio located at Long Lodge, 269 Kingston Road in Merton Park, South London. In the 1940s, it was owned by Piprodia Entertainment, Nikhanj Films and Film Producers Guild.

Many second features were produced at Merton Park, and for a time it was the base of Radio Luxembourg. Unlike many other studios, it remained open during World War II, producing films for the Ministry of Information. In the late 1940s, the studios produced several children's films.

In 1950, Anglo-Amalgamated began making films at Merton Park. From 1957 to 1959, they produced an average of one second-feature a month there. They produced the crime series Scotland Yard (1953 to 1961, 39 half-hour features), The Edgar Wallace Mysteries (1960 to 1965, 47 hour-long features) and The Scales of Justice (1962 to 1967, 13 half-hour features) at Merton Park. The first film in the Carry On series, Carry On Sergeant (1958), was shot there. The last film made at Merton Park, in March 1967, was from The Scales of Justice series, called Payment in Kind.

The director Ken Hughes made his early films at Merton Park in the 1950s, and the blacklisted American director Joseph Losey made his first British movies there under pseudonyms. Amongst those apprenticed for a time at the studio were the composer David Fanshawe, who trained as a film editor, and director Michael Winner.

The actor/author Stanley Morgan has a number of pages dedicated to the Merton Park films he starred in.

After closing, the site was re-developed for housing and the sound stages were demolished. However, Long Lodge, a historic building fronting Kingston Road which served as the studio's administrative headquarters, still exists.

In a 2008 documentary, Remembering Merton Park Studios, actor Clifford Earl presents memories of Merton Park Studios between the 1930s and late 1960s, with producers, directors and film technicians who worked there telling their stories. (Source: Talking Pictures TV)
