= Stuart Levy (producer) =

British film producer (1907–1966)

Stuart Levy (30 November 1907 – 3 June 1966) was a British film producer best known for his long association with Nat Cohen with whom he founded and ran Anglo-Amalgamated, making such productions as the Edgar Wallace Mysteries. He was born in Hendon, London and died in London. He has been described as a significant but "obscure" figure.

He owned the horse Anglo (named after Anglo-Amalgamated), which won the Grand National in March 1966. Levy died of a heart attack at home. He left behind £335,152.

His wife died in 1954. They had one child, a daughter called Sally, who died in July 1962 when she fell from the window of the apartment she lived in with her father. Her death was recorded as an accident.

Levy was from Liverpool and knew Brian Epstein's parents. He tried to persuade Nat Cohen to invest in a film starring The Beatles but Cohen refused.
