= Blondie Iscariot =

1948 novel

- Paperback edition
- Author: Edgar Lustgarten
- Language: English
- Genre: Crime
- Publisher: Museum Press
- Publication date: 1948
- Publication place: United Kingdom
- Media type: Print

Blondie Iscariot is a 1948 crime novel by the British author Edgar Lustgarten, later known as the host of the television shows Scotland Yard. It revolves around an attractive but treacherous London Gangster's Moll, who betrays several racketeers in post-Second World War London. It was critically the least well-received of his novels It has been described as "a sordid and shoddy melodrama lacking the sensitivity and promise of his earlier tale" A Case to Answer.

== Bibliography ==
- Jorgensen, John & Jones, Daniel. Contemporary Authors New Revision. Cengage Gale, 1997.
- Mann, David. Britain's First TV/film Crime Series and the Industrialisation of Its Film Industry, 1946-1964. Edwin Mellen Press, 2009.
- Reilly, John M. Twentieth Century Crime & Mystery Writers. Springer, 2015.
- White, Terry. Justice Denoted: The Legal Thriller in American, British, and Continental Courtroom Literature. Praeger, 2003.
