= Murder Anonymous =

- Directed by: Ken Hughes
- Screenplay by: James Eastwood; Roy H. Lewis
- Produced by: Alec C. Snowden
- Starring: Edgar Lustgarten; Peter Arne; Jill Bennett
- Narrated by: Edgar Lustgarten
- Production company: Merton Park Studios
- Distributed by: Anglo-Amalgamated (UK)
- Release date: November 1955 (UK)
- Running time: 31 minutes
- Country: United Kingdom
- Language: English

Murder Anonymous is a 1955 British crime short film directed by Ken Hughes and featuring Edgar Lustgarten, Peter Arne and Jill Bennett.

It was made by Anglo-Amalgamated as part of the Scotland Yard film series, as support for feature film screenings in cinemas .

== Plot ==
The death of a playboy points the finger of suspicion at Bowman, in whose divorce suit the dead man had been named.

== Cast ==
- Edgar Lustgarten as host
- Peter Arne as Douglas Sheldon
- Jill Bennett as Mrs. Sheldon
- Ewen Solon as Inspector Conway
- Brian O'Higgins as Detective Sergeant
- Louise Gainsborough as Mrs. Langster
- Arthur Lovegrove as Bowman
- Bettina Dickson as Mrs. Bowman
- John Penrose as Langster
- Vanda Godsell as hotel guest
- Dervis Ward as Detective Sergeant
- Alastair Hunter as Harry
- Philip Ray as police doctor
- Doug Robinson as Mr. Robinson
- Frank Hawkins as police sergeant
- Arthur Lowe as fingerprint expert
- Joy Webster as judo girl
- John Dunbar as doctor
- Travers Humphreys as himself

== Critical reception ==
Kine Weekly wrote: "This taut mystery featurette, the latest of the highly popular real life Scotland Yard series, shows how the police unravelled a particularly tricky muider case, involving a blind man and a woman Judo expert. Edgar Lustgarten, the BBC authority, explains salient issues, and the Right Honourable Sir Travers Humphries, a former judge, gives his opinion on the finer points of law. Their contributions underline the thrills realistically presented, and put the seal on first-class crime reporting. Very good quota."

Sky Movies noted "Another dip into the Merton Park Studios filing cabinet that housed their short Scotland Yard mysteries, hosted by mournful-faced criminologist Edgar Lustgarten. The director is Ken Hughes, who briskly illuminates the case in question and was later to go to on bigger - if not better – subjects, including The Trials of Oscar Wilde and Mae West's last picture, Sextette."
