= Vincent Ball =

Australian actor (born 1923)

Vincent Ball OAM
- Born: 4 December 1923 (age 102); Wee Waa, New South Wales, Australia
- Education: Royal Academy of Dramatic Art
- Occupations: Actor; writer; soldier
- Years active: 1949–2003; 2015
- Known for: A Town Like Alice; Breaker Morant; Phar Lap; Muriel's Wedding
- Notable work: Crossroads (UK TV series); Against the Wind (miniseries); Rush (miniseries); Anzacs; A Country Practice (TV series) recurring as Ted Campbell; Home and Away (TV series) as Tom Knight
- Spouse: Doreen Harrop (m. 1949)
- Military career
- Allegiance: Australia
- Branch: Royal Australian Air Force
- Service years: 1942–1945
- Rank: Flying Officer
- Conflicts: Second World War

Vincent Martin Ball (born 4 December 1923) is an Australian actor of film, theatre and radio active in the industry for nearly 55 years, firstly in Britain, starting in the late 1940s, and then his native Australia. Ball, a Royal Air Force military veteran, has also authored a number of books.

Ball is best known for film roles in British and Australian films and television films, including A Town Like Alice, Breaker Morant, Phar Lap, Muriel's Wedding and The Man Who Sued God.

In the mid-1950s Ball hosted Associated TeleVision (ATV)'s Sunday afternoon Children's Television, introducing such childhood favourites as The Roy Rogers Show, The Adventures of Noddy and The Adventures of Robin Hood (TV series). He became "the hero of thousands of children" and received enormous amounts of fan mail every week.

Ball appeared in numerous television roles, primarily in cameo guest roles, but had recurring roles in serials including the British serial Crossroads, Rush, The Young Doctors, A Country Practice and Home and Away.

Ball cited film stars Virginia McKenna and Chips Rafferty and Australian actor Ray Meagher as among his co-stars and friends in the entertainment industry.

Ball also worked variously in theatre, including Shakespeare, with productions of Henry IV, Part 1 and Romeo and Juliet and a musical based on Charles Dickens famous novel Great Expectations.

In 2003, Ball retired, but briefly returned to television in 2014. He turned 100 in December 2023.

== Early life and marriage ==
Vincent Martin Ball was born in the town of Wee Waa, New South Wales, on 4 December 1923, one of eight children to a father who worked as a linesman on the New South Wales Government Railways. Ball said he wanted to be an actor from an early age, particularly a "cowboy in the movies", as he loved going to the movies as a youngster and seeing Western stars like Tom Mix.

Ball married Sydney actress Doreen Harrop in 1949; she was also his elocution teacher and taught speech therapies. They had three children and reside at Chittaway Point, a suburb on the Central Coast of New South Wales.

== Military service ==
Ball left his job with the Australian division of the now defunct British firm General Electric Company after the Second World War broke out and, after military training in Canada, became a wireless air gunner with the Royal Australian Air Force, serving in Britain.

After the war, he returned to Australia and his old job. To correct his accent, which had by then morphed into part Canadian, part Cockney and part Australian, he took lessons in elocution and became interested in amateur dramatics.

== Professional career ==
=== Acting profession in Britain ===
Ball then from Sydney was working as an accountant in 1949, but decided he wanted to enter showbiz, so he set out writing letters asking for auditions. One was to the film studio the Rank Organisation which, impressed with his enthusiasm, told him to come to England and they would give him a screen test for a part in the 1949 British film version of The Blue Lagoon. By the time he got to England, production was under way, but he got a job as stand-in for Donald Houston in an underwater fight with an octopus. He was then cast as Jack Warner's son in Smiling Irish Eyes (Talk of a Million).

He was working as a bricklayer when he then won a scholarship to study drama at Royal Academy of Dramatic Arts. Having moved to Stowting, Kent, he appeared in supporting and uncredited film roles in the UK for the next two and a half decades. He was a juvenile lead in the TV films Rain Before Seven, Barnet's Folly and Nitro, before moving into slightly larger parts in films such as A Town Like Alice, Robbery Under Arms, Sea of Sand, and Danger Within. In 1969, he played Cecil Carpenter in Where Eagles Dare, alongside Richard Burton and Clint Eastwood.

His television credits in Britain include Gym Teacher, Jenkins, Compact, Man in a Suitcase, The Troubleshooters, Dixon of Dock Green, and a recurring role on the long-running UK soap opera Crossroads.

=== Acting career in Australia ===
Ball who was then living in Canterbury, Kent, returned to Australia in 1973. He was soon very busy acting in films, theatre and television.

Ball is best known for his work in Australian films and television series, including film roles in Breaker Morant, Phar Lap and Muriel's Wedding. His credits in Australian television serials include Cop Shop, The Sullivans, The Young Doctors, The Flying Doctors, Grass Roots and All Saints. His many roles in Australian mini-series or made-for-television films include Against the Wind, and the epic Anzacs.

In 2014, aged 91, he came out of retirement briefly to play a Second World War veteran named Tom Knight in the Australian soap opera Home and Away, whom series regular Alf Stewart (played by Ray Meagher) meets in hospital. The scenes went to air during April 2015, just before Anzac Day.

== Publications (selected) ==
Title	Year/Release	Publisher	ISBN
Words of Silence	21 May 2008	DoctorZed Publishing	ISBN 9780646983837
The Ivory Starr Collection	12 October 2008	Xlibris	ISBN 9781436358224
The Cathedral Tree	06 May 2013	Equilibrium Books	ISBN 9781921456848
Patrick Downs	31 July 2013	Equilibrium Books	ISBN 9781921456855
Regency Rebel	01 March 2014	Equilibrium Books (Rockingham, Australia	ISBN 9781921456909
Buck Jones: Where are You	01 September 2014	Equilibrium Books	ISBN 9780992435806 (also available audio CD)

== National honours ==
Ball was awarded the Medal of the Order of Australia in the 2016 Australia Day Honours.

== Filmography ==
=== Film ===
Year	Title	Role	Notes
1949	Warning to Wantons	Footman	Uncredited
1949	Stop Press Girl	Hero	featuring in "cinema sequence"
1949	Poet's Pub	Stacey	Uncredited
1949	The Interrupted Journey	First Workman	
1950	Come Dance with Me	Secretary	
1951	Talk of a Million	Jack Murnahan	
1951	Encore	Young Husband	segment : "Winter Cruise"
1952	Made in Heaven	Man at Party	Uncredited
1953	The Drayton Case	Henley's Assistant	Scotland Yard film series
1954	The Dark Stairway	Sergeant Gifford	Scotland Yard film series
1954	Imposter's Gold	Leonard Hughes	TV film
1954	Dangerous Voyage	John Drew	
1954	Devil's Point	Williams	
1954	The Black Rider	Ted Lintott	
1955	Barnet's Folly	Richard Barnet	TV film
1955	Nitro	Jeff	TV film
1955	John and Julie	Digger	
1955	The Stolen Airliner	Flight Sergeant Watkins	
1955	Stolen Time	Johnson	
1955	The Blue Peter	Digger	
1956	A Town Like Alice	Ben	
1956	The Secret of the Forest	Mr. Lawson	
1956	The Long Arm	P.C. at Hospital	uncredited
1956	Reach for the Sky	Thelma's cousin	uncredited
1956	The Baby and the Battleship	Second Sailor at Dance	uncredited
1956	The Battle of the River Plate	Barnes – HMS Achilles	uncredited
1957	Face in the Night	Bob Meredith	
1957	Robbery Under Arms	George Storefield	
1958	Blood of the Vampire	John Pierre	
1958	Sea of Sand	Sergeant Nesbitt	
1959	Danger Within	Captain Pat Foster	
1959	Summer of the Seventeenth Doll	Dowd	
1960	Identity Unknown	Ken	
1960	Dead Lucky	Mike Billings	
1960	Dentist in the Chair	Michaels	
1961	Feet of Clay	David Kyle	
1961	Very Important Person	Higgins	uncredited
1961	Nearly a Nasty Accident	Sergeant at Crybwyth	
1961	Highway to Battle	Ransome	
1961	A Matter of WHO	Dr. Blake	
1961	Middle Course	Cliff Wilton	
1962	The Slaughter of St Teresa's Day	Horrie Darcel	TV film
1962	Carry On Cruising	Jenkins	
1963	The Mouse on the Moon	Pilot	
1963	Echo of Diana	Bill Vernon	
1967	Follow That Camel	Ship's Officer	
1968	Nobody Runs Forever	Australian Policeman	uncredited
1968	Where Eagles Dare	Carpenter	
1969	Oh! What a Lovely War	Australian Soldier	
1971	Not Tonight, Darling	Alex	
1971	Clinic Exclusive	Bernard Wilcox	
1974	The Spiral Bureau		TV film
1974	Lindsay's Boy	Jim Lindsay	TV film
1975	Games for Parents and Other Children		TV film
1976	Arena	Bill Scott	TV film
1976	Deathcheaters	Commander Carson	
1978	The Irishman	Bailey Clark	
1978	Bit Part	Sherry	TV film
1979	Demolition	Ainsley	TV film
1980	Breaker Morant	Colonel Hamilton	
1981	Alison's Birthday	Dr. Jeremy Lyall	
1982	The Highest Honor	Lieutenant Commander Hubert Marsham	
1982	..Deadline..	Prime Minister	TV film
1983	Phar Lap	Lachlan McKinnon	
1986	Whose Baby?	Robert Monahan, K.C.	TV film
1986	Double Sculls	Stuart	TV film
1987	The Year My Voice Broke	Headmaster	
1987	Hot Ice	Harry Romano	TV film
1988	The Boardroom	Jonathon Hutt	TV film
1990	Call Me Mr. Brown	Captain Richie	
1991	The Private War of Lucinda Smith	Colonel Foster	TV film
1993	Love in Limbo	Cyril Williams	
1993	Frauds	Judge	
1993	Butterfly Island	Sergeant Pat Connolly	TV film
1994	Sirens	Bishop of Sydney	
1994	Muriel's Wedding	Priest	
1997	Paradise Road	Mr. Dickson	
2001	The Man Who Sued God	Cardinal	
2002	Black and White	Chief Justice Napier	
2003	The Night We Called It a Day	Rex Hooper	

=== Television ===
Year	Title	Role	Notes
1952	BBC Sunday Night Theatre	Young Officer	Episode: "Holiday in Berlin"
1954	BBC Sunday Night Theatre	George Grant	Episode: "Rain Before Seven"
1954	Douglas Fairbanks Presents	Harry	Episode: "The Wedding Veil"
1955	BBC Sunday Night Theatre	Locke	Episode: "The Voices"
1957	Motive for Murder	John Blackmoor	Mini-series
1958	White Hunter	Trevor	Episode: "The Step-father"
1959	The Flying Doctor	Jeff Petersen	Episode: "The Revelation"
1960	International Detective	Joplin	Episode: "The Joplin Case"
1960	No Man's Island	Denis Barker	Mini-series
1960	ITV Play of the Week	Mallow	Episode: "The Watching Eye"
1961	The Cheaters	Jessup	Episode: "An Obituary for a Champion"
1961	Theatre 70	Martin Wade	Episode: "News From Jericho"
1961	BBC Sunday-Night Play	Digger	Episode: "The Hasty Heart"
1961	Deadline Midnight	Keith Durrant	Recurring role
1963	Once Aboard the Luggar...	Dennis Barker	Episode: "The Girl Arrives"
1963	Ghost Squad	Father Huggins	Episode: "The Big Time"
1963	The Plane Makers	Nelson	Episode: "The Testing Time"
1963	Zero One	Pilot	Episode: "The Stowaway"
1963–1965	Compact	David Rome	Series regular
1966	Blue Light		Episode: "Target, David March"
1966	The Man in the Mirror	Austin	2 episodes
1966	The Newcomers	Mr. Mackie	3 episodes
1966	The Troubleshooters	Captain Grainger	Episode: "Operation Saigon"
1966–1973	Crossroads: Kings Oak	Kevin McArthur	Series regular
1967	Dixon of Dock Green	Abel	Episode: "The Team"
1968	Dixon of Dock Green	King	Episode: "Find the Lady"
1968	Man in a Suitcase	Dalby	Episode: "The Boston Square"
1968	Z-Cars	Foster	Episode: "Vigilance"
1969	Dixon of Dock Green	Garry Kendrick	Episode: "The Set-Up"
1970	Dixon of Dock Green	Jenkins	Episode: "Shadows"
1970	Softly, Softly: Taskforce	Scotland	Episode: "Private Mischief"
1971	Play for Today	Simpson	Episode: "Traitor"
1971	The Troubleshooters	Reg Walters	Episode: "A Touch of the Nelsons"
1972	Dixon of Dock Green	Jack Stevens	Episode: "Time Out"
1973	Harriet's Back in Town	Kenneth Hammond	4 episodes
1973	The Dragon's Opponent	Captain McColm	Mini-series
1974	Silent Number	Norris	Episode: "Cecelia"
1975	Certain Women	Horrie	1 episode
1975	Homicide	Patrick O'Brien	Episode: "Snails for Dinner"
1975	Ben Hall	Sergeant Garland	Series regular
1975	Shannon's Mob	Ashby	Episode: "There Was a Man"
1976	Silent Number	White	Episode: "Yesterday's Friends"
1976	Rush	Superintendent James Kendall	Recurring role
1976	King's Men		Episode: "Suffer Little Children"
1976	The Sullivans	Admiral Spencer	
1976	Bluey	Muley Price	Episode: "Speak to Me Only"
1977	Bluey	Kenneth Granger	Episode: "A Political Animal"
1977	The Outsiders	Jack Gower	Episode: "Sophie's Mob"
1978	Cop Shop	James Benedict	2 episodes
1978	Chopper Squad	John Williams	Episode: "Something to Shout About"
1978	Against the Wind	Governor Macquarie	Episode: "The Windfall Summer"
1979	Cop Shop	David Hammond	2 episodes
1979	Skyways	Captain Fitzgerald	Episode: "The Legend"
1979	A Place in the World		Mini-series
1979	The Young Doctors	Kevin McAllister	2 episodes
1980	Cop Shop	Adrian Cummins	1 episode
1980	Timelapse	Boyd Mackiel	Mini-series
1982	A Country Practice	Bunny Wilcox	Episode: "Come Blow Your Horn"
1983	The Dismissal	Justin O'Byrne	1 episode
1984	The Last Bastion	General Sturdee	Mini-series
1984	Special Squad		2 episodes
1984	Bodyline	Joseph Lyons	Mini-series
1984	A Country Practice	Keith Fitzgerald	Episode: "Moment of Truth"
1985	Anzacs	Sir Rupert Barrington	Mini-series
1987	Rafferty's Rules	Mathew	Episode: "Kids"
1987	Vietnam	Dave the Spook	Mini-series
1987–1993	A Country Practice	Ted Campbell	Recurring role
1988	The Dirtwater Dynasty	Eastwick Banker	Mini-series
1989	Mission: Impossible	Presenter	Episode: "The Golden Serpent"
1989	Bangkok Hilton	British Attache	Mini-series
1990	The Flying Doctors	Warren Price	Episode: "Daddy's Girl"
1990	The Paper Man	Sir Evan Mason	Mini-series
1991	G.P.	Dr. Thomas Radley	3 episodes
1995	Blue Murder	Dr. Cumberland	Mini-series
1998	Children's Hospital	Keith Charrington	Episode: "Home Truths"
2000	Grass Roots	Monty Chesney	Episode: "April to July"
2001	All Saints	Bill Weiner	2 episodes
2015	Home and Away	Tom Knight (WWII veteran)	2 episodes
