= Anthony McCormack =

Australian television and radio producer (born 1983)

- Born: 15 August 1983 (age 43); Melbourne, Australia
- Occupation: Producer

Anthony McCormack is an Australian television and radio producer. He is best known for his work on "The Naughty Rude Show", a comedic look at the sexual lives of young people.

== Student Youth Network ==
Anthony was a part of the Student Youth Network. SYN radio broadcasts in Melbourne on the 90.7 FM frequency, as well as internationally, live streaming on the Internet, at the SYN Website. In 2007 he was SYN's first Creative Director.

=== Early Radio ===
Porcelain Slap was Anthony's first radio show. He and his co-host Hugh R. Macdonald hosted the sketch comedy show late Sunday nights in 2005. Anthony soon graduated to the station's flagship drive-time show, The Wind Up.
During his tenure on the drive show, he took part in various publicity stunts including a campaign to put his co-host onto Neighbours.

In 2006 Anthony became heavily involved in The Naughty Rude Show, an informal look at sex and relationships that allowed listeners to SMS questions into the studio. The show started rotating young people around in guest-hosting roles to offer a variety of different viewpoints and opinions.

In his time at SYN radio Anthony was also involved with popular shows Sketchy at Best, Panorama and Pen Island, as well as the Get Cereal Breakfast Show.

=== Get Cereal Breakfast Show ===
Anthony was the first Executive Producer of SYN's new Breakfast Show, Get Cereal. First airing on Monday 26 February 2007, the show featured the same three hosts volunteering five days a week from 6am - a first for the station. The show was designed to showcase the diversity of SYN.

=== Naughty Rude Television ===
In 2009 Anthony wrote, directed, produced and anchored a television version of "The Naughty Rude Show" for Channel 31. The show was produced for and by young people and dealt with taboo sexual topics in a light but respectful manner.

The show hit a chord with viewers at a time when Channel 31 was being denied a digital broadcast license. The program was often cited as an example of the relevance of the channel and the necessity to grant it a digital license. Channel 31 was finally granted a digital license in November 2009.

"The Naughty Rude Show" won two Antenna Awards in 2010: one for Best Youth Program which Anthony accepted, as well as Best Female Presenter for host Jackie Doran.

=== 31 Questions and Beyond ===
Starting in 2012, McCormack served as moderator for the community TV game/comedy show 31 Questions all three seasons it aired. In addition to announcing prizes at the end of the show, McCormack served as a player in skits, writer, editor, and judge, jury, and executioner of all decisions. He also provided a fair amount of comedy.

Since 31 Questions, McCormack has been co-host of the Channel 31 political satire show, the Leak. He has also been host of the Leak's spinoff satire quiz show, Quiz Night, since its inception in the fall of 2017.
