= Charles Laurence =

British actor and playwright (1931–2013)

- Born: 10 January 1931; Tangiers
- Died: 13 July 2013 (aged 82); St John's Wood, London, England
- Other name: Carlos Felipes
- Occupations: Actor, playwright
- Years active: 1955–1999

Charles Laurence (10 January 1931 – 13 July 2013) was a British actor and playwright who worked in films and television.

== Early life ==
Charles Laurence was born Carlos Felipes in Tangiers when it was an International zone, to a Swiss-Scottish mother and a Gibraltarian father of Spanish-Italian descent. Until the age of seven, he spoke only French and Spanish. He learned English as well when the family moved to England. As a young boy he went to Taunton School in Somerset and then to RADA.

== Career ==
In the early 1950s, after a spell at Guildford Repertoire (1953), he appeared in numerous stage plays and comedies in repertoire at the Oxford Playhouse and the Bristol Old Vic. In the West End he appeared in Ross at the Haymarket Theatre. In the 1950s and 1960s he appeared in films and on television. He worked as a playwright from 1969 to 1999. He died on 13 July 2013 in St Johns Wood, London.

== Work as an actor ==
- Cross Channel (1955) - Jean-Pierre Moreau
- A Hill in Korea (1956) - Pte. Kim
- ITV Play of the Week: (The Last Hours (1959) and The School for Wives (1958)) - Hendrik / Horace, Oronte's son
- Hotel Imperial (1960) - Jose da Irala
- Dixon of Dock Green (1962) - Cable
- Sierra Nine (1963) - Brother Jullen
- The Third Man (1964) - The Bell Boy
- A High Wind in Jamaica (1965) - Tallyman
- 199 Park Lane (1965) - Nicky
- Vendetta (1966) - Ray
- The Magnificent Two (1967) - Sharpshooter
- Man in a Suitcase (1967–1968) - Van Driver / Martin (final film role)

== Work as a playwright ==
- What’s a Mother For? (Jan 1969) Armchair Theatre, ITV (starring June Whitfield and Joe Brown)
- The Swan Won’t go in the Fridge (Oct 1969) Armchair Theatre, ITV (starring Rosemary Leach and Peter Cellier]
- Now, Take My Wife (1971), a TV series of 6 episodes for the BBC (starring Sheila Hancock, Donald Houston, and Liz Edmiston)
- Just Harry and Me (1971) for Comedy Playhouse, BBC
- My Fat Friend (1972), a stage comedy (with Kenneth Williams and Jennie Linden)
- Snap! (1974), a stage comedy (Maggie Smith starred in this; Vaudeville Theatre London)
- Poor Little Rich Girls (1984), a TV series of 8 episodes starring Maria Aitken, Jill Bennett and Joan Hickson
- About Alice (1998), a stage comedy
- The Ring Sisters (1999), a stage comedy
