= Board room (disambiguation) =

A board room is the meeting place of a board of directors.

Board Room or Boardroom may also refer to:

- Boardroom, Inc., now Bottom Line, Inc., an American publisher
- The Boardroom, an Australian television movie
- Board Room, Alaska Airline's airport lounge
- Boardroom (company), an American media network founded by Kevin Durant and Rich Kleiman
