= The Drayton Case =

1953 British film by Ken Hughes

- Directed by: Ken Hughes
- Written by: Ken Hughes
- Produced by: Alec C. Snowden executive Nat Cohen; Stuart Levy
- Starring: Victor Platt; Vincent Ball; John Le Mesuirer
- Narrated by: Edgar Lustgarten
- Cinematography: John Wiles
- Edited by: Derek Holding
- Production company: Anglo-Amalgamated
- Distributed by: Anglo-Amalgamated (UK)
- Release date: February 1953
- Running time: 26 minutes
- Country: United Kingdom
- Language: English

The Drayton Case is a 1953 British short crime film directed and written by Ken Hughes and starring Hilda Barry and John Le Mesurier. It was produced by the Anglo-Amalgamated production company as part of their Scotland Yard film series. It is hosted by Edgar Lustgarten.

It is based on the case of Harry Dobkin with names and some other details changed.

== Plot ==
During the early years of World War II, a bomb from a German aeroplane uncovers the corpse of a strangled woman. It turns out she was killed by her husband Charles Drayton.

== Cast ==
- Edgar Lustgarten as host
- Vincent Platt as Drayton
- Hilda Barry as Elizabeth Drayton
- John Le Mesurier as Divisional Superintendent Henley
- Vincent Ball as Henley's assistant
- Bartlett Mullins as Mr. Taylor
- Edward Malin as caretaker
- Geoffrey Bellman as pathologist
- Eric Evans as Sergeant Thompson
- Humphrey Morton as dental technician
- Bruce Beeby as policeman

== Production ==
Made at Merton Park Studios, it was originally released as support for cinema feature film screenings and later screened on television.

== Reception ==
The Daily Film Renter wrote: "Edgar Lustgarten tells the story in his popular intimate style, and the leading characters are effectively played by Victor Platt, Hilda Barry and John Le Mesurier. A well-produced taut documentary, it makes an excellent programme filler."
