= The Dark Stairway (1954 film) =

British short film by Ken Hughes

- Directed by: Ken Hughes
- Written by: Ken Hughes
- Produced by: Alec C. Snowden executive Nat Cohen; Stuart Levy
- Starring: Russell Napier; Vincent Ball
- Narrated by: Edgar Lustgarten
- Cinematography: J. M. Burgoyne-Johnson; Ron Bicker
- Edited by: Derek Holding
- Production company: Anglo-Amalgamated
- Distributed by: Anglo-Amalgamated (UK)
- Release date: March 1954
- Running time: 32 minutes
- Country: United Kingdom
- Language: English

The Dark Stairway (also known as The Greek Street Murder) is a 1954 British short film directed and written by Ken Hughes and starring Russell Napier and Vincent Ball. It was one of the Scotland Yard series of second feature shorts made in the 1950s for British cinemas by Anglo-Amalgamated at the Merton Park Studios. The films in the series are narrated by crime writer Edgar Lustgarten, and were subsequently broadcast as television episodes.

== Plot ==
A blind man, George Benson, witnesses the murder of Harry Carpenter by Joe Lloyd. Benson finds himself accused of the murder. Inspector Jack Harmer finds the murder weapon and discovers Carpenter was murdered because he betrayed Lloyd to the police. Benson manages to identify Lloyd by his ring, voice and hair products' smell.

== Cast ==
- Edgar Lustgarten as narrator
- Russell Napier as Inspector Harmer
- Vincent Ball as Sergeant Gifford
- George Manship as George Benson
- Edwin Richfield as Joe Lloyd
- Gene Anderson as Molly
- Lionel Newbold as Mr. Cross
- Bill Nagy as Bar Owner (credited as Bill Nagie)
- Mark Bellamy as Mr. Miller
- Grace Denbeigh-Russell as Mrs. Morris
- Henry Webb as Old Lag

Napier reappeared as Inspector Harmer in the 1954 episode The Strange Case of Blondie, and subsequently went on to play Inspector Duggan in thirteen episodes between 1956 and 1961.

== Reception ==
The Monthly Film Bulletin wrote: "An unpretentious and workmanlike crime short in the Scotland Yard series, with broad, elementary characterisation and a clean story-line, which creditably builds up an atmosphere of realism."

Picturegoer wrote: "Imaginative use of camera and pocket-size sets, leaves it unhampered by its modest budget. By and large an enterprising British team."
