= The Long Dark Hall =

- U.S. theatrical poster
- Directed by: Reginald Beck; Anthony Bushell
- Written by: Nunnally Johnson
- Based on: A Case to Answer by Edgar Lustgarten
- Produced by: Peter Cusick
- Starring: Rex Harrison; Lilli Palmer; Raymond Huntley
- Cinematography: Wilkie Cooper
- Edited by: Tom Simpson
- Music by: Benjamin Frankel
- Production companies: London Films; Five Ocean Films; Cusick International Films
- Distributed by: British Lion Films
- Release date: 6 February 1951 (UK)
- Running time: 88 minutes
- Country: United Kingdom
- Language: English

The Long Dark Hall is a 1951 British crime film directed by Reginald Beck and Anthony Bushell and starring Rex Harrison, Lilli Palmer and Raymond Huntley. It was written by Nunnally Johnson based on the 1947 novel A Case to Answer by Edgar Lustgarten. It was made at Walton Studios.

== Plot ==
After a showgirl begins an affair with Arthur Groome, a married man, she is found murdered. Groome discovers her body but fearing his wife's knowledge of his affair he does not summon the police; he soon becomes the prime suspect for the murder. Most of the film portrays the trial of Groome at the Old Bailey, London.

== Cast ==
- Rex Harrison as Arthur Groome
- Lilli Palmer as Mary Groome
- Tania Heald as Sheila Groome
- Henrietta Barry as Rosemary Groome
- Dora Sevening as Mary's mother
- Ronald Simpson as Mary's father
- Raymond Huntley as Chief Inspector Sullivan
- William Squire as Sergeant Cochran
- Ballard Berkeley as Superintendent Maxey
- Anthony Dawson as the man
- Denis O'Dea as Sir Charles Morton
- Anthony Bushell as Clive Bedford
- Henry B. Longhurst as Judge
- Patricia Cutts as Rose Mallory
- Meriel Forbes as Marjorie Danns
- Brenda De Banzie as Mrs Rogers
- Douglas Jefferies as Dr. Conway
- Fletcher Lightfoot as Jury Foreman
- Anthony Shaw as Clerk of the Court
- Michael Medwin as Leslie Scott
- Colin Gordon as Pound
- Lionel Murton as Jefferson (US version only)
- Eric Pohlmann as Mr Polaris
- Lilli Molnar as Mrs Polaris
- Frank Tickle as Alfred Tripp
- Tom Macaulay as ironworks manager
- Richard Littledale as Mr Sims
- Jenny Laird as Mrs Sims
- Tony Quinn as Joe the barman
- Jill Bennett as first murdered girl

== Critical reception ==
The Monthly Film Bulletin wrote: "The Long Dark Hall contains elements of the thriller and character study, but suffers in both from a lack of definition and purpose in the writing. The excitement of the thriller is sacrificed by presenting the story in flashback, and by the early revelation of the killer's identity. Concentration on the mechanics of investigation and trial, on the other hand, reduces the story's interest as the study of an innocent man's reaction to an unjust charge. ... The script writer has relied on tricks, such as the murderer's appearance at the trial, and the irritating surprise ending, which maintain a certain element of suspense, but for the most part the film is crippled by the confused nature of the writing."

Variety wrote: "Rex Harrison and Lilli Palmer playing husband and wife have the dominating roles, which they play with their accustomed polish. Raymond Huntley portrays the chief inspector with surprising restraint while Denis O'Dea is determined and forceful as the prosecuting counsel. Anthony Bushell, who also produced and co-directed, plays the defense lawyer with slight timidity. Anthony Dawson rather overdoes the killer role and his pretense at being friendly with the wife of the accused lacks conviction."

In The New York Times, Bosley Crowther wrote, "a very tidy murder drama arrived yesterday from England at the Rivoli Theater ... An unusually literate and impressively acted film ... It is English in setting and temperament, but international in its entertainment appeal. Thoughtful audiences should especially welcome this picture."
