= Game for Three Losers (novel) =

1952 novel

- Author: Edgar Lustgarten
- Language: English
- Genre: Crime
- Publisher: Museum Press
- Publication date: 1952
- Publication place: United Kingdom
- Media type: Print

Game for Three Losers is a 1952 crime novel by the British writer Edgar Lustgarten. The story revolves a young Member of Parliament with bright prospects who becomes caught up in a blackmail plot.

== Film adaptation ==
In 1965 it was adapted into a film of the same title directed by Gerry O'Hara and starring Michael Gough. Shot at Merton Park Studios, it was produced by the makers of the long-running series of Edgar Wallace adaptations but was not itself part of the series.

== Bibliography ==
- Goble, Alan. The Complete Index to Literary Sources in Film. Walter de Gruyter, 1999.
- Grant, John. A Comprehensive Encyclopedia of Film Noir: The Essential Reference Guide. Rowman & Littlefield, 2023.
- Jorgensen, John & Jones, Daniel. Contemporary Authors New Revision. Cengage Gale, 1997.
- Reilly, John M. Twentieth Century Crime & Mystery Writers. Springer, 2015.
