= Cross Channel (film) =

1955 film by R. G. Springsteen

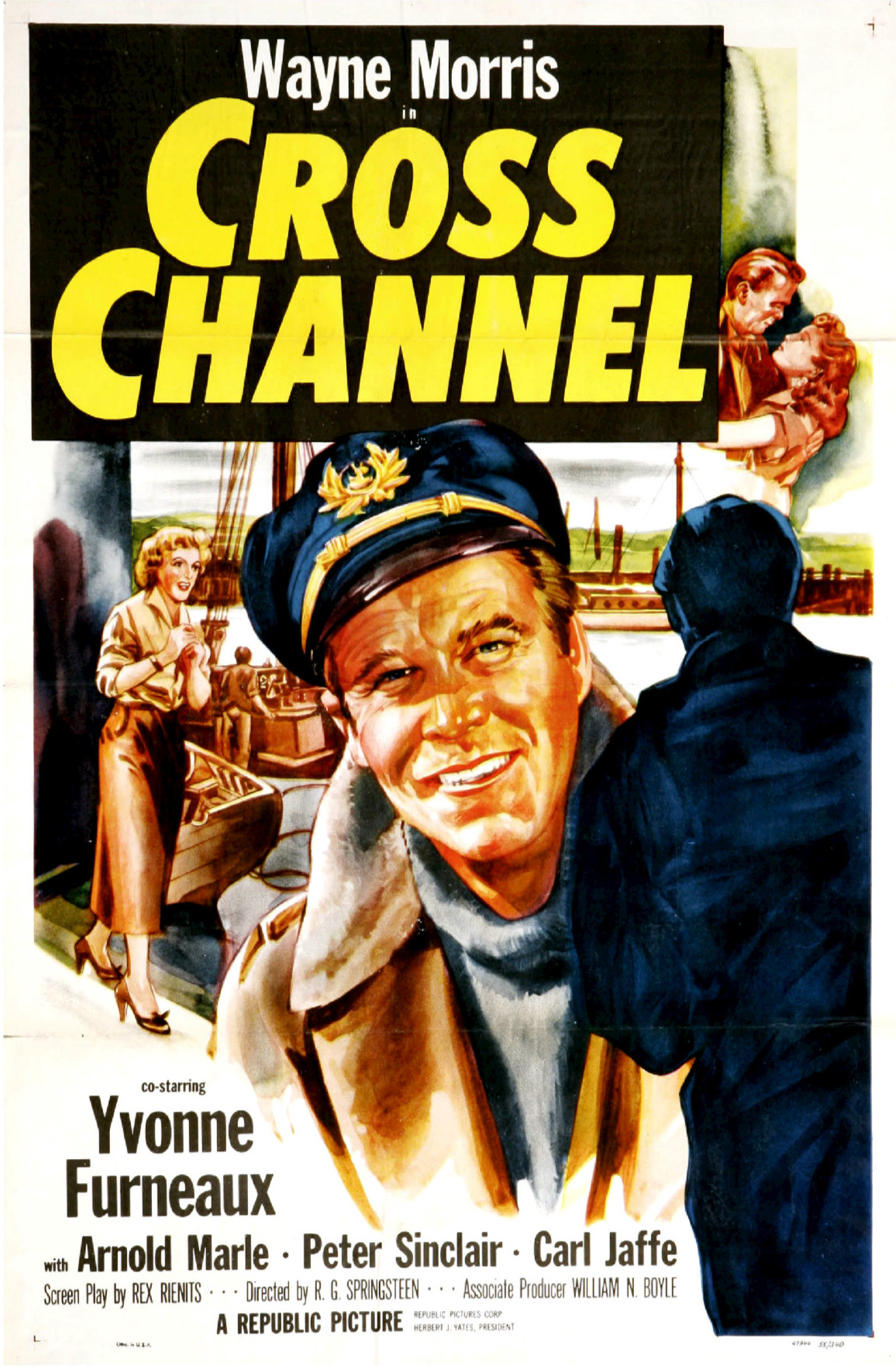
- Theatrical release poster
- Directed by: R. G. Springsteen
- Screenplay by: Rex Rienits
- Produced by: William N. Boyle
- Starring: Wayne Morris; Yvonne Furneaux; Patrick Allen; June Ashley; Carl Jaffe; Peter Sinclair
- Cinematography: Basil Emmott
- Edited by: John Seabourne
- Music by: Lambert Williamson
- Production company: Republic Pictures
- Distributed by: Republic Pictures
- Release date: September 29, 1955
- Running time: 61 minutes
- Country: United States
- Language: English

Cross Channel is a 1955 drama film, directed by R. G. Springsteen, and written by Rex Rienits. The film stars Wayne Morris, Yvonne Furneaux, Patrick Allen, June Ashley, Carl Jaffe and Peter Sinclair.

The film, made in 1954, was filmed in England and Northern France, with British and European actors, (save for its American star), by a British subsidiary of Republic Pictures. It was released on September 29, 1955.

The fact that the male romantic lead's profession is not that of a private eye precludes this picture from being categorised as a traditional noir film. Its fast pace, high body-count, and thriller-genre subject matter, (even the traditional romance sub-plot), are all elements of what's now thought of as a film noir,

== Plot ==
Crime drama. 61 minutes, made in black-and-white. 1954.

A criminal gang is operating a smuggling racket, bringing stolen jewellery into England across the English Channel.

Gary Parker, an American from Texas, known informally as 'Tex', is skipper of a small sea-going motor launch and runs a business known as 'Parker Charter Service', a small operation consisting of Tex himself and a single employee, a burly (but whisky-soaked) deckhand named 'Soapy'.

Tex is hired to transport a passenger named Kerrick from Dover in Kent to a French trawler in the middle of the English Channel. But Kerrick deceives him into bringing back to England a packet of stolen jewellery, which he obtains from the French boat but pretends he had forgotten to mail before departing from Dover.

When Tex goes to the address on the packet, he there finds Hugo Platt, the consignee, motionless, wide-eyed but seemingly dead, sitting bolt up-right at his desk; he falls forward just as the police arrive, and Tex escapes through the window; but Otto Dagoff, the dead man's partner, follows him back to the boatyard.

Dagoff tells him the jewellery was stolen in England, smuggled to Amsterdam, re-cut, then smuggled back into England. Dagoff accuses Tex of the murder, and blackmails him into sailing the next night to meet a ship in mid-Channel, the SS Cypriota, deliver the jewels to its captain, and bring back $20,000 in American currency.

The next night, Tex sets out to sea, but finds a stowaway on his boat: the supposedly dead Hugo Platt. Platt intends to murder him and abscond with the $20,000, so that, when Tex doesn't show up again, Dagoff will believe Tex has stolen his money, so will not be looking for Platt.

In a fight on the motor launch, Tex is thrown overboard by Platt; but he is picked up from the sea when it grows light, by a passing French fishing boat, 'The Blue Orchid', and is landed by the fishing boat in France.

The police send a man to the boat yard to interview Tex, but Soapy does not know when Tex will be returning.

Later, Tex telephones Soapy from the dockside. Soapy reports the boat was found beached off Felixstowe, and that the cops have been tipped-off about the diamonds. Tex then telephones Dagoff, and speaks to his assistant, Kitty, (June Ashley). He warns her about Platt, expecting her to tell Dagoff; but unknown to him, Kitty is in cahoots with Platt, who's standing next to her, overhearing everything .

In France, Tex falls in love with Jacqueline, (Yvonne Furneaux), the beautiful sister of Jean-Pierre, the skipper of the 'Blue Orchid'. And Tex finds the smuggler, Kerrick in a café, attempting to play the same game with Jean-Pierre that he had used to deceive Tex. There is a fight; Kerrick gets the better of Jean Pierre, but not Tex, so threatens him with a gun. Nevertheless Tex warns Kerrick that Hugo Platt is still alive and has tried to kill him, and that it is Hugo who has stolen the money.

Kerrick reports to Dagoff that Tex is still alive in France. Platt comes to Port Solaire and shoots at Tex through the glass of the same dockside telephone kiosk, but he survives, and embarks on the 'Blue Orchid' for England. Jacqueline extracts the bullet, and nurses Tex on the voyage to England - which is quite lengthy due to the fishing which is done en route.

Kerrick now blackmails Hugo into giving him half of the stolen money - ten thousand dollars. But Hugo kills him instead, to avoid doing so.

Tex returns to Dover, and Soapy mentions that Kitty had called by with Hugo, and that they had tried to extort information from Soapy of Tex's whereabouts - information he didn't have. Tex realises that Kitty never passed on the 'phone message he gave her.

Hugo and Kitty make plans to flee together, to get clear of Dagoff. Soapy and Tex try to find Kerrick, but at his rooms they find Detective Sgt. Burroughs instead, who's called in to investigate Kerrick's murder. Tex nearly gets arrested, but Soapy locks the door to the apartment as they run for it, so that the police can't follow.

Tex now goes to see Dagoff, to clear himself of suspicion. He knows he can call on the Captain of the SS Cypriota to identify Hugo as the man who was given the $20,000. But Kitty and Hugo intervene, and Hugo callously shoots Dagoff. In the ensuing fight between Hugo, Tex and Soapy, Kitty accidentally shoots and kills Hugo.

Finally, Tex is reunited in France with Jacqueline, who runs to meet his approaching boat: they embrace.

== Cast ==
- Wayne Morris as Tex Parker
- Yvonne Furneaux as Jacqueline Moreau
- Patrick Allen as Hugo Platt
- June Ashley as Kitty
- Carl Jaffe as Otto Dagoff
- Peter Sinclair as Soapy
- Charles Laurence as Jean-Pierre Moreau
- Arnold Marlé as Papa Moreau
- Michael Golden as W.L. Carrick
- Jacques Cey as Duclos
- Jack Lambert as Detective Sergeant Burroughs
