= Solo for Canary =

British television series

- Genre: Thriller
- Written by: Ken Hughes
- Directed by: George R. Foa
- Starring: Lana Morris
- Country of origin: United Kingdom
- Original language: English
- No. of series: 1
- No. of episodes: 6

Production
- Producer: George R. Foa
- Running time: 30 minutes
- Production company: BBC

Original release
- Network: BBC 1
- Release: 10 November – 15 December 1958

Solo for Canary is a six-part British thriller television series which originally aired on the BBC in 1958.

== Selected cast ==
- Andrew Osborn as Superintendent Maddern
- Lana Morris as Ruth Maddern
- David Davies as Chief Superintendent Drew
- John Stone as Detective Superintendent Wilson
- Ilona Ference as Rose
- Edward Kelsey as Flower
- William Lucas as Durea
- William Dexter as Detective Knowles
- Peter M Elrington as Detective Brown
- Keith Anderson as Police Constable
- William Fox as Conner
- Bryan Kendrick as Ryan
- Clive Marshall as Charlie
- Jimmy Ray as Johnny
- Anne Rogers as Jill
- Barbara Shelley as Marie Vazzani
- Terence Alexander as Flash
- George Pravda as Joseph Viga
- Allan Jeayes as Judge
- Marne Maitland as Fink
- Lockwood West as Dr Lessinger

== Bibliography ==
- Baskin, Ellen . Serials on British Television, 1950-1994. Scolar Press, 1996.
