= Jackie Doran =

Australian television presenter

Jackie Doran is an Australian television and radio presenter.

She is mostly known for her role in The Naughty Rude Show which aired on Channel 31, WTV and C31 Adelaide in 2009, for which she won an Antenna Award for Most Outstanding Female Presenter. Jackie is one of the four members in The Boardroom podcast. She currently lives in Melbourne, Australia.
