= Anzac storyline (Home and Away) =

- Home and Away episodes
- The title card used in a trailer for the storyline.
- Episode nos.: Episodes 6170–6172, 6174–6180
- Directed by: Danny Raco; Geoff Bennett; Geoffrey Nottage
- Written by: Fiona Kelly; Brooke Wilson; Chris Phillips; David Lawrance; Sam Meikle; Sandy Webster; Fiona Bozic; Hamilton Budd; Holly Lyons; Rebecca Greensill
- Original air date: 9–23 April 2015

Episode chronology
← Previous; Episode 6169	Next → Episode 6181

The Anzac storyline from the Australian television soap opera Home and Away was broadcast over ten episodes from 9–23 April 2015 to commemorate the Anzac Day centenary. Plans for a potential storyline to celebrate the centenary were revealed by actor Ray Meagher in a 2014 interview. He said that it would explore his character Alf Stewart's history with war. The storyline was confirmed in March 2015 and billed as a tribute to the centenary. Director Geoffrey Nottage came up with the idea to honour the anniversary of the Gallipoli campaign and raise awareness among younger viewers of the sacrifices Australians made in all wars. It was described as a "passion project" for Nottage by actor Charlie Clausen, while Meagher called it one of the best storylines he had been given. He hoped that they had done the subject matter justice.

The storyline is told through the eyes of Alf, who is persuaded to join a school excursion to the Australian War Memorial, after learning about the students' lack of respect for Anzac Day. The Memorial visit leads to an attitude change for the younger characters, who realise that the day is about honouring the sacrifice soldiers have made. The plot also touches on the subject of post-traumatic stress disorder, as Alf begins to suffer flashbacks to his time in the Vietnam War and tries to come to terms with it. While the group spend the night in some recreated trenches to learn what it was like for the soldiers of World War I, the pyrotechnics and sounds of gunfire trigger Alf's PTSD and he collapses. The storyline features a guest appearance from retired actor Vincent Ball, whose character Alf meets in the hospital, and concludes with an Anzac Day dawn service.

During the planning stages, scenes were set to be filmed in Europe, but due to financial reasons the storyline was changed to focus on the characters visiting the Australian War Memorial. The scenes were filmed in November 2014 and they mark the first time Home and Away has filmed in Canberra. The scenes involving the recreated trenches were filmed in Camden, New South Wales in a set left over from the 2009 film X-Men Origins: Wolverine. The Anzac Day dawn service at the conclusion of the storyline was filmed at the serial's usual outdoor filming location of Palm Beach. The cast had to be on set in the middle of the night in order to film at dawn and the service was filmed in 90 minutes to make use of the natural light. Nottage was nominated for the TV Drama Serial accolade at the 2016 Australian Directors' Guild Awards for the episode in which Alf collapses. The storyline was praised by television critics, with some calling the scenes "genuinely moving", powerful, well written and executed.

== Plot ==
John Palmer (Shane Withington) receives notice of a naval reunion in Adelaide for Anzac Day, but he realises he cannot afford to attend and plans to go to the memorial in nearby Yabbie Creek. His wife Marilyn Chambers (Emily Symons) thinks it is a shame that they have no place to honour their soldiers in Summer Bay. John draws up plans for a war memorial in the Bay in time for the Anzac centenary, which his friend Alf Stewart (Ray Meagher) immediately supports. Some of the Summer Bay High students are selected to go on the two-day excursion to the Australian War Memorial in Canberra. Evelyn MacGuire (Philippa Northeast) tells Alf about the trip and says that she does not see why they are wasting time studying something that happened a hundred years ago. Alf tells his daughter Roo Stewart (Georgie Parker) that the younger generation does not care about Anzac Day and could not say what the Gallipoli centenary means. Roo points out that they just have a different perspective, while Marilyn thinks that the excursion will help them appreciate the sacrifices made. Alf then reveals that he has never been inside the War Memorial despite his grandfather's name being on the Roll of Honour. Marilyn encourages Alf to volunteer as a chaperone and he later agrees to do so. Teacher Zac MacGuire (Charlie Clausen) informs the gathered students that Alf's experience as a Vietnam War veteran will be beneficial, and Evelyn realises she put her foot in it with Alf earlier.

Upon arrival at the War Memorial, Zac asks the students to be respectful, while Marilyn accompanies a hesitant Alf inside. Referring to the medals on display, Evelyn says that it seems wrong to get a prize for fighting, which angers Alf. He goes to the Vietnam War gallery and Jett Palmer (Will McDonald) notices he is affected by the noise of the helicopters. Alf and John hear Matt Page being disrespectful towards the artefacts and Alf declares that the whole trip has been a joke as the kids do not give a damn. The group go outside for a break and Matt takes a couple of photos of his friends. Marilyn tells the group they should be ashamed of themselves for their lack of respect. She orders them to go back inside and take a proper look around. Oscar MacGuire (Jake Speer) stares at a photo of a field of unidentified war graves, Josh Barrett (Jackson Gallagher) looks at a picture of a young soldier, Jett compares a platoon photo to that of the photos Matt took outside, Matt notices a lone mannequin covering his face, Zac finds VJ Patterson (Matthew Little) looking at a wall of soldier's photos, while Marilyn and John look around the courtyard. Alf goes inside the Hall of Memory where he finds Evelyn crying at The Tomb of the Unknown Australian Soldier. She accompanies him to the Roll of Honour panels, where Alf places a flower next to his grandfather's name. Alf returns to the Vietnam War gallery, where the sounds of helicopters and gunfire cause him to suffer flashbacks to the war.

After leaving Canberra, Zac reveals that the group will be spending the night in a recreated trench to learn about mateship. As night falls, flares go off and noise and debris fill the trench. Zac explains that they will experience what the diggers went through in World War I. Jett notices Alf is missing and leads the search for him. Alf wanders the field amidst the noise and flares, suffering flashbacks before collapsing. Jett finds him in a ditch and the students work together to get him onto a stretcher. Alf complains of chest pains and he is air lifted to the nearest hospital. Dr. Delaney (Jessica Donoghue) explains to Alf and Roo that he has an irregular heartbeat and needs to wait for a cardiologist. Alf reckons the trip to the War Memorial opened the eyes of the students. Their conversation is overhead by fellow patient Tom Knight (Vincent Ball), who converses with Alf. Jett arrives to check on Alf and introduces himself to Tom. Alf comments that Jett reminds him of an old army doctor and Tom asks if he served. Alf tells him he did two tours of Vietnam, while Tom reveals that he was in the Air Force and flew Lancaster Bombers. Tom explains that he spent his 21st birthday in occupied France, before saying that too many boys did not make it home to their families. Alf thanks Jett for looking out for him. Dr Delaney plans to keep Alf in for a few more days, and he realises that he will miss the Anzac Day service.

Tom tells Alf that he has a son, but he has not seen him in years. A frantic Tom later wakes Alf and recalls the time when he lost all six members of his crew after they were shot at and forced to crash land in a field. When Alf wakes up again, a nurse (Emma Playfair) tells him that Tom has died. She packs his belongings and Alf says he will see that Tom's son gets them. He opens a tin containing Tom's medals and cries as he looks at photos of Tom and his crew. Jett decides that those who went to the War Memorial should take control of doing something for the centenary. Josh designs and builds a sculpture, while the others make paper poppies. Alf's tests are delayed, but Roo declares that he will be at the service and Nate Cooper (Kyle Pryor) offers to help. Martin Ashford (George Mason) tells Denny Miller (Jessica Grace Smith) that his brother was in the army and he will spend Anzac Day visiting his grave. Nate and Roo go to the hospital to break Alf out. She tells him that she picked up his grandfather's ashes on the way. The dawn service begins with the beach covered in paper poppies and a lone digger's hat on a rifle in the sand. The community gather near the newly installed sculpture and a choir of students sing "Abide With Me", as Alf, Roo and Nate arrive. Alf tells Jett that Tom died and give him Tom's medals for the day. Evelyn reads "For the Fallen" and Jett recites the "Ode of Remembrance". A bugler plays the "Last Post". In his prison cell, Darryl Braxton (Stephen Peacocke) stands to attention, while Andy Barrett (Tai Hara) and the River Boys lay wreaths in the sea. Alf and Roo go down to the shore and Alf finally scatters his grandfather's ashes in the water.

== Production ==
=== Conception ===
During a May 2014 online interview hosted by the show's British broadcaster Channel 5, Ray Meagher, who plays Alf Stewart, revealed that there was "some talk" about a potential storyline to celebrate the centenary of World War I. He continued: "There's a possibility of a storyline for me there, which will go through my character's history and my family's involvement in the wars. But whether that gets through the powers that be, who knows?" The storyline was confirmed the following year and was billed as Home and Away's "tribute to the Anzac centenary." Meagher said the storyline would be an attempt by a soap opera to honour all servicemen and women across all areas of conflict in the last hundred years. A reporter for The Daily Telegraph confirmed that the plot would air during April 2015 in the lead up to the anniversary of the Gallipoli campaign.

One of the show's long-term directors, Geoffrey Nottage came up with the idea to honour the anniversary. He believed it was important for younger viewers to be aware of the sacrifices Australians made during all wars. Talking to a reporter for the Australian Associated Press, Nottage explained: "I saw great value in doing it and pushed it a long as best I could. It's not about glorifying war but remembering sacrifices because too many young lives were lost and their legacy is what the kids of today will inherit." Actor Charlie Clausen, who plays Zac MacGuire, described the storyline as "a real passion project" for Nottage and praised him for telling the story of Anzac Day.

The story arc is told through the eyes of Alf Stewart, who becomes upset with the younger characters lack of respect for Anzac Day and decides to join their school trip to the Australian War Memorial. The storyline also deals with the issue of PTSD, as Alf recalls his time in the Vietnam War. Meagher felt that it was "the best storyline" he had been given in recent years and he was "humbled" at taking on such an important issue. He also hoped that the show would do the subject matter justice and honour those who had served, adding "The Lest We Forget message is so important and it was great for (the show) to do our bit to recognise that." This is the second time the serial has explored Alf's time in the Vietnam War as part of his fictional backstory. In an episode broadcast in 1997, it emerged that Alf had been wounded during battle and was saved by his friend Jeff Marshall (Jason Montgomery), who later commits suicide.

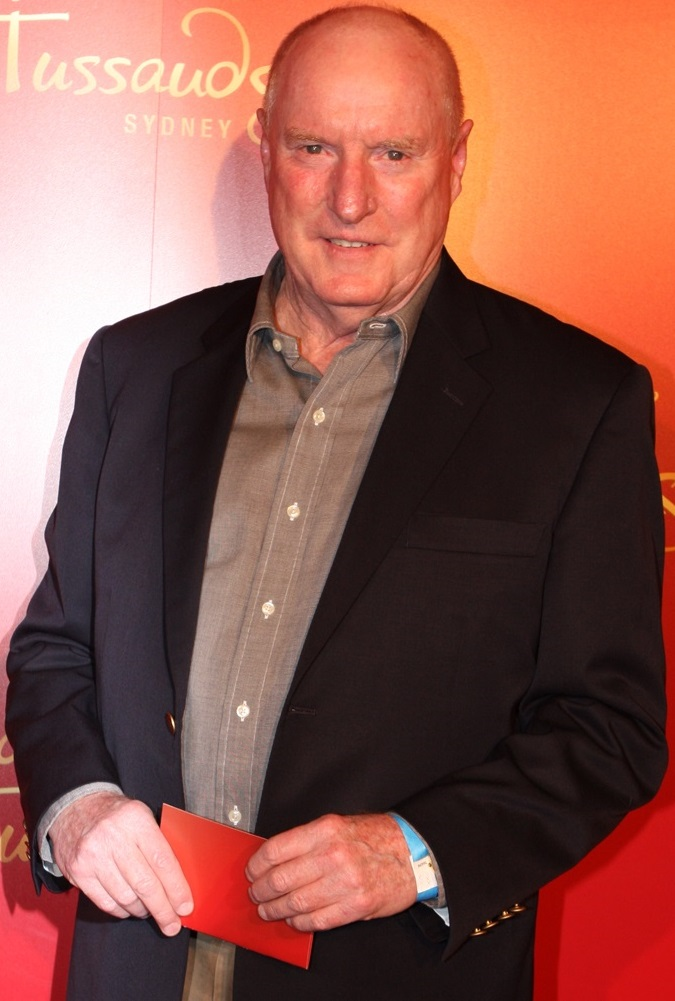
The storyline is told through the eyes of Alf Stewart, played by Ray Meagher (pictured).

=== Storyline development ===
The storyline begins with Alf learning about the feelings that the younger Bay residents have towards ANZAC Day, particularly Evelyn MacGuire (Philippa Northeast) who upsets him when she questions why people need rewards for killing other people. Sarah Ellis of Inside Soap pointed out that Alf is "the perfect choice" to accompany the students on the trip to the War Memorial. But Alf is show to be reluctant to go to Canberra, and Meagher told Ellis that Alf has not visited the War Memorial since the end of the Vietnam War. He has his reasons for not wanting to go, but no one else knows what they are. Alf is persuaded to go on the excursion by his daughter Roo Stewart (Georgie Parker), John Palmer (Shane Withington) and Marilyn Chambers (Emily Symons), who think that he might enjoy it and will be able to give the students "first-hand knowledge" of what it is like to go to war.

Alf is "filled with trepidation" as he reaches the top of the steps of the War Memorial, and Meagher explained that Alf has pushed the memories of war down all these years instead of confronting them. As the students explore the museum, Alf enters one of the rooms, where he can hear the noise of the helicopters. Withington said "Alf comes out and it's clear something is wrong." Jett Palmer (Will McDonald) expresses his concerns to John, but they are both unaware that Alf is experiencing flashbacks to his time in the Vietnam War. Withington said that Alf is also starting to have "the rumblings of post-traumatic stress disorder." The museum visit changes the attitudes of Evelyn and the other students. Clausen stated "There was a real cynicism towards military action before they came on this trip. Now, they're beginning to understand it's more about honouring the sacrifice the soldiers made so we can live the lifestyle we have today." However, Stephen Downie of TV Week observed that Alf is "in hell" as he suffers flashbacks to Vietnam.

In an effort to give the students a taste of what life was like for a soldier during World War I, their teacher Zac MacGuire arranges for the group to spend the night in some recreated trenches. Clausen said that the site uses pyrotechnics and sounds of the war, such as gunfire, which triggers Alf's PTSD. While Meagher explained that the gunfire and flashing lights bring back Alf's "worst memories" from Vietnam, adding "At the height of the simulated battle, it's too much for him. He wanders out of the trench into a field in the middle of the night and collapses into a water-filled ditch." Jett is the first character to notice Alf is missing and raises the alarm. As the students pull together to find him, Clausen said that it leads to them "realising there's a cause bigger than just their own personal issues." Alf is found in the ditch, seemingly suffering with chest pains. The students come together to organise help and get Alf onto a stretcher. Clausen commented that "the kids respond to the call to action." Alf is airlifted to the nearest hospital, while the students are "united in their concern for Alf's welfare."

Meagher told Ellis (Inside Soap) that Alf's condition is very serious and is made worse as no one really knows what is wrong with him. Everyone assumes that with his medical history, it is his heart. The storyline features a guest appearance from actor and former Royal Australian Air Force veteran Vincent Ball, who retired from the acting industry in 2003. Meagher was excited to work with Ball, saying "It was wonderful being the youngest bloke in the room for a change. But I tell you what ... Vincent may be 91, but he didn't miss a beat. It was a real honour to be in every scene with him." Ball plays World War II veteran Tom Knight. Alf meets Tom after he is airlifted to the local hospital, following his collapse. Both Meagher and Ball found the episodes in which Alf and Tom reminisce about their war experiences to be emotional. They formed "a bond of mutual respect" for one another, and acknowledged "the significance of the 'humbling' storyline." The storyline ends with the characters, including Alf, attending an Anzac Day dawn service near the beach.

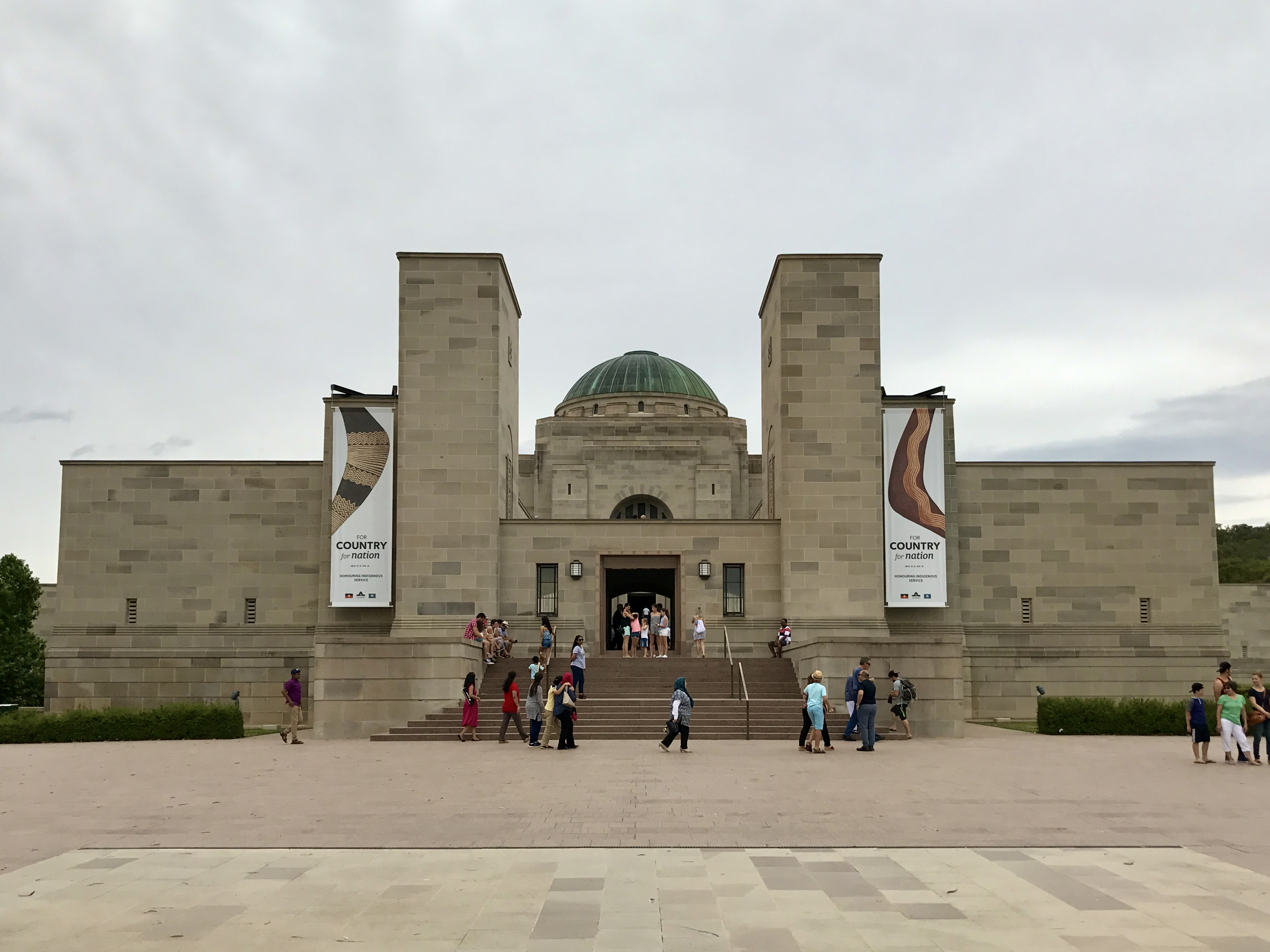
Scenes for the storyline were filmed at the Australian War Memorial.

=== Filming ===
In the initial planning stages, some scenes were due to be filmed on the Western Front in Europe, but Meagher revealed that there was not enough money available, so the storyline was changed to focus on the characters visiting the Australian War Memorial. The storyline marks the first time Home and Away has filmed in the city of Canberra. Filming took place in November 2014 in various locations at the War Memorial, including the World War II gallery, Vietnam War gallery, Roll of Honour, and the courtyard and Pool of Reflection. Of filming at the Memorial, Meagher commented: "The Australian War Memorial was magnificent, it was just incredible. The day shoot there was fantastic."

Following their visit to the War Memorial, the students are informed that they will be spending the night in some trenches in order to experience what the Diggers went through. These scenes were shot near the town of Camden in trenches that were left over from the set of the 2009 film X-Men Origins: Wolverine. To make the trenches seem more authentic, various props were added to them, including ladders, radios, and old tins. Clausen praised the serial's art department for utilising the trenches, while Withington thought they seemed "amazingly accurate" for World War I.

The Anzac Day dawn service scenes featured in Episode 6180 were filmed at Palm Beach, and the cast were required to be on set in the middle of the night in order to film at dawn. The service was filmed within 90 minutes, as Nottage felt it was "vital" to shoot in the natural light and the correct hour of a real service. There was one re-take as the sky behind the bugler playing the Last Post had become too "golden". Of the shoot, Nottage stated "You could have gone for three hours and done it again (with different shots)... but you would have lost the hour, the time and the light and that was so important to what we were trying to achieve."

== Reception ==
Director Geoffrey Nottage received a nomination for the TV Drama Serial accolade at the 2016 Australian Directors' Guild Awards for Episode 6176, which featured Alf's collapse.

A Daily Telegraph reporter branded the storyline "powerful" and wrote that Meagher was "set to deliver some of his most dramatic performances as Alf Stewart". An Australian Associated Press writer noted how this storyline was only the second time in a decade the soap had tackled "a strong and pertinent story line about Anzac Day." A critic for the Evening Gazette observed that Alf was "horrified" when the younger characters showed that they did not think Anzac Day was important. While a television critic for Sunday Mail commented that "Alf is in one of his usual flutters of indignation, this time over the young folk not being all that interested in Anzac Day." They questioned whether there was "something else biting him", before noting that the trip to the War Memorial "answers that when he starts having flashbacks."

Melinda Houston of The Sydney Morning Herald praised the War Memorial scenes, giving Episodes 6174 and 6175 three and a half stars out of five. She stated: "'Special episodes' can often be a bit of a disappointment, living up to neither the hype nor their intentions. And this hour-long H&A could so easily have been quite ghastly. The good news is, it's anything but." Houston found the "internal journey" of the characters to be "beautifully handled, making this surprisingly and genuinely moving." The Australian's Lyndall Crisp chose the double episode as part of their "Quick Bites" feature, commenting that for Alf "old memories of the conflict come flooding back, and they're not good." A Soaplife writer branded the scenes in which the students spend the night in the trenches and Alf's collapse as "must see".

The Evening Gazette critic later stated that "the experience brings back traumatic memories for Alf" and that he is further "devastated" when Tom dies. Houston's fellow Sydney Morning Herald critic Darren Devlyn praised the show for broadcasting the storyline and its contribution to "the local TV landscape", writing "Sure, there are plotlines in any soap that could cure insomnia, but there are occasions when the crew from Summer Bay do a mighty job of tackling issues that matter. Well written and executed is this Anzac Day storyline that revolves around school students jumping on a bus for an excursion to the Australian War Memorial. Initially resistant to the idea of going along for the ride, Vietnam vet Alf Stewart decides he will jump on the bus and face his demons."

The Guardian's Jazz Twemlow similarly praised the soap for tackling the Anzac anniversary, calling it "impressive" while noting that it also raises the issue of "how teenagers engage with a 'legend' they feel is no longer relevant to them." Twemlow quipped that Alf was "a moth to the candle of insensitivity" as he appeared whenever the students were saying something offensive as they wandered through the exhibits. He said "Seriously kids, whenever you're about to mutter something disrespectful about the Anzacs, just know that Alf is going to emerge from behind a cannon. You would have thought they’d twig after the first two or three times". Twemlow thought the scene in which the students take a selfie on the museum steps was "a somewhat two-dimensional take on Gen Y", but found it to be "a uncharacteristically realistic moment for Home and Away." As the episode in the museum concluded and they spent the night in the trenches, Twemlow concluded "OK, so the students' journey towards a greater cultural awareness was a little contrived, but what else do you expect from a soap opera? A lot less, to be honest."
