= My Fat Friend =

Play by Charles Laurence

- Original West End production poster
- Written by: Charles Laurence
- Original language: English
- Genre: Comedy

Premiere
- Date premiered: 1972
- Place premiered: Theatre Royal, Brighton

My Fat Friend is a play by Charles Laurence.

== Plot ==
The comedy is an ugly duckling tale about an overweight young woman who attracts the attention of a potential suitor. With the help of her friends/roommates, she undergoes a diet and exercise regime to burn the extra pounds she assumes she needs to lose in order to hold the man's attention.

== Performances ==
The play premiered on 6 November 1972 at the Theatre Royal, Brighton, where it ran for one week before transferring to the Rex Theatre in Wilmslow for another week's engagement. On 6 December, it opened in London's West End at the Globe Theatre, where it enjoyed a modest run despite mediocre reviews. The cast, directed by Eric Thompson, included Jennie Linden and Kenneth Williams.

After seven previews, the Broadway production, directed by Robert Moore, opened on 31 March 1974 at the Brooks Atkinson Theatre, where it ran for 288 performances. The cast included Lynn Redgrave, John Lithgow, and George Rose, who was nominated for the Tony Award for Best Featured Actor in a Play and won the Drama Desk Award for Outstanding Performance.

John Inman, star of the BBC department-store comedy Are You Being Served?, appeared in the November 1972 production at the Rex Theatre in Wilmslow, and later in a 1998 revival of the play.
