= Poor Little Rich Girls (1984 TV series) =

1984 British television sitcom

- Genre: Sitcom
- Written by: Jill Bennett; Maria Aitken; Charles Laurence
- Directed by: Nicholas Ferguson
- Starring: Jill Bennett; Maria Aitken
- Country of origin: United Kingdom
- Original language: English
- No. of series: 1
- No. of episodes: 8

Production
- Producer: Pieter Rogers
- Running time: 30 minutes
- Production company: Granada Television

Original release
- Network: ITV
- Release: 12 July – 31 August 1984

Poor Little Rich Girls is a 1984 television sitcom which first aired on ITV in 1984. It portrays the lives of two financially-struggling cousins who attempt to rebuild their lives, following the loss of their husbands from divorce and widowhood. It starred Jill Bennett and Maria Aitken who co-created and scripted it together.

Actors who guest appeared in episodes of the series include Joan Sims, George A. Cooper, Sheila Keith, George Chakiris and Arthur Hewlett.

== Main cast ==
- Maria Aitken as Kate Codd (8 episodes)
- Jill Bennett as Daisy Troop (8 episodes)
- Richard Walker as Dave Roberts (7 episodes)
- Lewis Fiander as Larry Codd (6 episodes)
- Joan Hickson as Lady Harriet (5 episodes)

== Bibliography ==
- Howard Maxford. Hammer Complete: The Films, the Personnel, the Company. McFarland, 2018.
