= Now Barabbas (play) =

Now Barabbas is a play by the British writer William Douglas Home. Its original West End run at the Vaudeville Theatre lasted for 130 performances from 7 March to 28 June 1947. It concerns a variety of inmates at a British prison, including new arrivals, old hands and a convicted murderer sentenced to hang. The original cast included Jill Bennett. The title refers to Barabbas the robber of biblical tradition.

== Film adaptation ==
In 1949 the play was made into a film Now Barabbas starring Richard Greene, Cedric Hardwicke, Kenneth More and Richard Burton.

== Bibliography ==
- Wearing, J.P. The London Stage 1940-1949: A Calendar of Productions, Performers, and Personnel. Rowman & Littlefield, 2014.
