= Game for Three Losers =

1965 British film by Gerry O'Hara

- British quad poster
- Directed by: Gerry O'Hara
- Written by: Roger Marshall
- Based on: Game for Three Losers by Edgar Lustgarten
- Produced by: Jack Greenwood
- Starring: Michael Gough; Mark Eden; Toby Robins; Allan Cuthbertson
- Cinematography: James Wilson
- Edited by: Derek Holding
- Music by: Bernard Ebbinghouse
- Production company: Merton Park Studios
- Distributed by: Anglo-Amalgamated Film Distributors
- Release date: 1965
- Running time: 55 minutes
- Country: United Kingdom
- Language: English

Game for Three Losers is a 1965 British drama film directed by Gerry O'Hara and starring Michael Gough, Mark Eden and Toby Robins. It was written by Roger Marshall and made at Merton Park Studios as part of the long-running series of Edgar Wallace adaptations; this being adapted from a novel of the same name by Edgar Lustgarten.

== Plot ==
Happily married businessman and politician Robert Hilary lets his desire for his new secretary get the better of him, and he kisses her. Her boyfriend finds out and blackmails him, but when the blackmailer continues to return for more money Robert decides to call in the authorities. However, this leads to severe consequences for all.

== Cast ==
- Michael Gough as Robert Hilary
- Mark Eden as Oliver Marchant
- Toby Robins as Frances Challinor
- Rachel Gurney as Adele
- Allan Cuthbertson as Garsden
- Al Mulock as Nick
- Roger Hammond as Peter Fletcher
- Lockwood West as Justice Tree
- Mark Dignam as Attorney General
- Catherine Willmer as Miss Stewart
- Anne Pichon as Miss Fawcett
- Kenneth Benda as Bryce
- Leslie Sarony as Harley
- David Lander as Burton
- David Browning as Casey
- Frank Forsyth as Jimmy
- Toni Palmer as Jackie
- Donald Tandy as Conyers
- Colin Douglas as Superintendent Manton
- Peter Bennett as Watkins

== Reception ==
The Monthly Film Bulletin wrote: "While in some respects a good example of Merton Park's efforts to raise the conventional crime-drama second feature above the level of dreary routine, this thriller miscalculates many of its effects. Shot in a manner that was presumably aiming at Simenon-like concision, it seems instead to be full of unnecessary omissions, which hamper the smooth development of the story. The severe curtailment of the final trial scene, plunging us from Hilary's discomfiture under cross-examination and Oliver's feeling of triumph to Oliver being sentenced, is particularly weak. Michael Gough, conceivably miscast in the role of the M.P., fails to secure as much sympathy as the character would seem to deserve."
