= Ken Hughes =

English film director, writer and producer (1922–2001)

- Born: Kenneth Graham Hughes; 19 January 1922; Liverpool, Lancashire, England
- Died: 28 April 2001 (aged 79); Los Angeles, California, U.S.
- Occupations: Director; Screenwriter

Kenneth Graham Hughes (19 January 1922 – 28 April 2001) was an English film director and screenwriter. He worked on over 30 feature films between 1952 and 1981, including the 1968 musical fantasy film Chitty Chitty Bang Bang, based on the Ian Fleming novel of the same name. His other notable works included The Trials of Oscar Wilde (1960), Of Human Bondage (1964), Casino Royale (1967), and Cromwell (1970). He was an Emmy Award winner and a three-time BAFTA Award nominee.

Hughes has been called "a filmmaker whose output was consistently interesting and entertaining, and deserved more critical attention than it has received."

== Early life and career ==
Hughes was born in Yates St, Toxteth, Liverpool. His family moved to London soon after. Hughes won an amateur film contest at age 14 and worked as a projectionist. When he was sixteen he went to work for the BBC as a technician and became a sound engineer.

In 1941 he began making documentaries and short features; he also made training films for the Ministry of Defence. Hughes eventually returned to the BBC where he made documentaries.

=== Director ===
Hughes's first film as director was the "B" movie Wide Boy (1952). He did a short feature, The Drayton Case (1953), which became the first of Anglo-Amalgamated's Scotland Yard film series (1953-61), and several of the later installments including The Dark Stairway (1953) and Murder Anonymous (1955). (Hughes was one of Anglo's key early directors.) He did Black 13 (1954) then made The House Across the Lake (1954) for Hammer Films, based on Hughes's own novel.

He made The Brain Machine (1955), Little Red Monkey (1955), and Confession (1955). Timeslip (1955) was science fiction. He was one of several writers on The Flying Eye (1955) and Portrait of Alison (1955).

Hughes received notice for Joe MacBeth (1955) a modernised re-telling of Macbeth set among American gangsters of the 1930s, but shot at Shepperton Studios in Surrey. He shared an Emmy Award in 1959 for writing the television play Eddie (for Alcoa Theatre) which starred Mickey Rooney.

=== The later 1950s ===
Hughes made some films for Columbia: Wicked as They Come (1956), and The Long Haul (1957). He wrote High Flight (1957) made by Warwick Films, producers Albert Broccoli and Irving Allen, who released through Columbia. For British TV he wrote episodes of Solo for Canary (1958).

For Warwick Films, he directed two films with Anthony Newley, Jazz Boat (1960) and In the Nick (1960). Warwick liked his work and hired Hughes to direct The Trials of Oscar Wilde (1960) with Peter Finch. It was well received, and was Hughes's favourite among his films because he did not make any concessions in its production.

== Career peak ==
Hughes wrote and directed The Small World of Sammy Lee (1963), based on Hughes's television play Sammy which had been broadcast by the BBC in 1958. Anthony Newley was the title lead in both, playing a confidence trickster and gambler. Hughes also directed episodes of the TV series Espionage (1964).

He replaced Bryan Forbes, who in turn had replaced Henry Hathaway, as director of Of Human Bondage (1964), starring Laurence Harvey and Kim Novak. It was financed by Seven Arts Productions, who used Hughes on the Tony Curtis comedy Drop Dead Darling (1965). Hughes also wrote episodes for the TV series An Enemy of the State (1965). He was subsequently one of several directors who worked on the James Bond spoof Casino Royale (1967).

He co-wrote and directed Chitty Chitty Bang Bang (1968) for producer Broccoli. Although it was a success at the box office, it received a negative response from critics, who objected to its sentimentality. It was a project he did not enjoy working on: "The film made a lot of money, but that doesn't really make me feel any better about it. On the other hand, I've made pictures that got awards at Berlin and places, and didn't make any money, and that doesn't make me feel any better either."

Irving Allen produced Cromwell (1970), a dream project of Hughes who called it the "best thing I've ever done". It starred Richard Harris in the title role and Alec Guinness as Charles I, but was not a financial success. It meant that Hughes was unable to raise funds for a proposed film of Ten Days That Shook the World.

In 1969 Hughes sold his company, Ken Hughes Productions, to Constellation Investments for the issue at par of 300,000 of 6 per cent convertible unsecured loan stock. The stock was deposited by the vendors as security for warranties that profits of Ken Hughes Productions during the next ten years would exceed £500,000 after corporations tax and be available to Constellation.

== Later career ==
Hughes directed The Internecine Project (1974) for British Lion and Alfie Darling (1975), a sequel to Alfie (1966); they both flopped. He wrote and directed episodes of Oil Strike North (1975).

Hughes sold his production company for £300,000 in 1969, but encountered financial difficulties in the 1970s. In July 1975 he declared bankruptcy. He told the London Bankruptcy Court he earned £44,177 in 1968 and £47,960 in 1969 but nothing in 1970. "The film industry collapsed," said Hughes. "It has not recovered yet." He had debts of £32,277 and had to sell his house to pay creditors. Hughes attributed his financial situation to paying maintenance to two wives and an inability to reduce expenses. He was also hit by a tax bill.

He worked in the United States for the first time, directing Mae West in her last film, Sextette (1978).

His final film was the slasher movie Night School (1981), the film debut of Rachel Ward.

== Personal life and death ==
Hughes had three marriages, to two women. From 1946 to 1957, he was married to Charlotte Epstein. From 1970 to 1976, he was married to Cherry Price, with whom he had a daughter Melinda, an opera singer. The marriage was dissolved in 1976, and Hughes remarried his first wife in 1982. They were married when Hughes died from complications from Alzheimer's disease. He had been living in a nursing home in Panorama City in Los Angeles.

== Critical appraisal ==
Filmink magazine profiled Hughes, arguing that "he was a very “ups and downs” kind of guy with a solid overall average: the maker of a genuine classic (Trials of Oscar Wilde), a handful of terrific movies (Long Haul, Joe MacBeth, Wide Boy) and some films that have splendid things in them (Small World of Sammy Lee, Chitty Chitty Bang Bang and yes, Casino Royale). He also made movies that were dull (Cromwell), dire (Alfie Darling), disappointing (Timeslip) and in one case, beyond belief (Sextette). He clearly worked best when attached to a feisty little production company with strong Hollywood links."

== Filmography ==
Feature films

- Sammy (1952) - writer
- Wide Boy (1952) - director
- The Drayton Case (1953) - director, writer
- The Missing Man (1953) - writer, director
- The Candlelight Murder (1953) - writer, director
- Black 13 (1953) - director, writer
- The Dark Stairway (1953) a.k.a. The Greek Street Murder - director, writer
- The House Across the Lake (1954) a.k.a. Heat Wave - director, writer
- The Brain Machine (1955) - director, writer
- Little Red Monkey (1955) a.k.a. Case of the Red Monkey - director, writer
- Night Plane to Amsterdam (1955) - director
- Confession (a.k.a., The Deadliest Sin, 1955) - director, writer
- Timeslip (a.k.a. The Atomic Man, 1955) - director
- The Flying Eye (1955) - writer
- Joe MacBeth (1955) - director, writer
- Postmark for Danger (1955) a.k.a. Portrait of Alison - writer
- Wicked As They Come (1956) a.k.a. Portrait in Smoke - director, writer
- Town on Trial (1957) - writer
- The Long Haul (1957) - director, writer
- High Flight (1957) - writer
- Sammy (1958) - producer, writer, director
- Solo for Canary (1958) - writer
- Jazz Boat (1960) - director, writer
- The Trials of Oscar Wilde (1960) - director, writer
- In the Nick (1960) - director, writer
- The Small World of Sammy Lee (1963) - director, writer
- Of Human Bondage (1964) - director
- Drop Dead Darling (1966) a.k.a. Arrivederci, Baby! - director, producer, writer
- Casino Royale (1967) - director, writer
- Chitty Chitty Bang Bang (1968) - director, writer
- Shark! (1969) - writer
- Cromwell (1970) - director, writer
- Sammy (1972) - writer
- The Internecine Project (1974) - director
- Fall of Eagles (1974) - writer
- Alfie Darling (1975) - director, writer
- Sextette (1978) - director
- Night School (1981) - director

Short films

- The Blazing Caravan (1954) - writer, director
- Passenger to Tokyo (1954) - director
- The Strange Case of Blondie (1954) - writer, director
- Murder Anonymous (1955) - director

Television

- Alcoa Theatre (1958) - writer episode "Eddie"
- Espionage (1964) - writer, director
- An Enemy of the State (1965) - writer
- Colditz (1972) - writer
- Menace (1973) - writer
- Dial M for Murder (1974) - writer
- Oil Strike North: Deadline (1975) - episode "Deadline" - writer

== Novels ==
- The Long Echo (1955)
