= The Nanny (1965 film) =

1965 British film by Seth Holt

- Theatrical release poster
- Directed by: Seth Holt
- Written by: Jimmy Sangster
- Produced by: Jimmy Sangster
- Starring: Bette Davis; William Dix; Wendy Craig; Jill Bennett
- Cinematography: Harry Waxman
- Edited by: Tom Simpson
- Music by: Richard Rodney Bennett
- Production companies: Associated British Picture Corporation; Hammer Film Productions; Seven Arts
- Distributed by: Warner-Pathé Distributors (UK); 20th Century-Fox (US)
- Release dates: 7 November 1965 (UK); 27 October 1965 (US)
- Running time: 93 minutes
- Country: United Kingdom
- Language: English
- Budget: $1,300,000 (estimated)
- Box office: $2 million (US/ Canada)

The Nanny is a 1965 British psychological horror thriller film directed by Seth Holt and produced by Hammer Film Productions. It stars Bette Davis, Wendy Craig, and Jill Bennett, and was adapted by Jimmy Sangster from the 1964 novel of the same name by Evelyn Piper (a pseudonym for Merriam Modell). The film was scored by Richard Rodney Bennett and shot at Elstree Studios.

The story follows a disturbed 10-year-old boy who returns home from a residential school after being blamed for the death of his younger sister. He becomes convinced that his family's long-serving nanny, who appears caring and devoted, poses a deadly threat.

== Plot ==
After being blamed for the drowning death of his younger sister Susy, ten-year-old Joey is sent to a school for emotionally disturbed children. Two years later, he returns home, still harboring deep mistrust toward the family's longtime nanny. Joey suspects she may have played a role in Susy's death and now believes she intends to poison him. He refuses to eat food she prepares, abandons the room she decorates for him, and insists on locking his door and making her promise not to enter the bathroom while he bathes.

Joey's behavior troubles his emotionally fragile mother, Virginia, who is still mourning Susy. Nanny remains Virginia's main source of comfort, as she had once cared for both Virginia and her sister, Pen, in childhood. Joey's father, Bill, a Queen's Messenger, soon departs on a business trip, leaving Joey alone at home with Virginia and Nanny.

Joey enlists Bobbie, the 14-year-old daughter of the doctor who lives upstairs, to help with a prank: he places her large doll in a running bath to startle Nanny. When Nanny finds the doll, she reacts with visible distress and has to lie down. Virginia scolds Joey for his cruelty, given the family tragedy.

Later, Nanny prepares steak and kidney pie. Joey refuses to eat it, suspecting poison, but Virginia accepts a helping and soon falls violently ill. She is hospitalized, and Joey is blamed for the incident. His Aunt Pen, weakened by childhood illness, comes to supervise him in Virginia's absence.

During Pen's visit, Joey emerges from the bathroom dripping wet and claims Nanny tried to drown him. Pen dismisses this as fantasy. Later, as Pen becomes short of breath, she asks Nanny for her heart medication. Nanny delays, and Pen's condition worsens.

Joey sneaks up to Bobbie's window and retells what really happened the day Susy died: while Joey played with his father's model trains, Susy went to the bathroom and accidentally fell into the tub while trying to retrieve her doll. Nanny, returning from an appointment, turned on the taps without checking inside. When she later found Susy's body, she bathed it in a dazed state. Joey witnessed this and tried to call for help, but Nanny silenced him and tried to put him in the tub with the corpse. Though Joey escaped, Nanny accused him of being responsible, leading to his institutionalization.

Dr. Medman later finds Joey in his apartment and returns him downstairs. That night, Joey barricades himself in his room with a makeshift alarm. Pen wakes up and sees Nanny outside Joey's door with a pillow. Nanny claims it's for Joey, but Pen recalls how Nanny once forbade pillows during their childhood. Realizing Nanny may intend to smother Joey, Pen confronts her. Overcome with emotion, Pen suffers a heart attack. As she lies dying, Nanny withholds her medicine and begins to explain her mental unraveling: she had once been a single mother, and her daughter died from a botched illegal abortion. Returning home from this trauma, she found Susy's body and snapped. Fearing exposure, she rationalized silencing Joey to protect the reputation of nannies everywhere.

After Pen dies, Nanny tries to get into Joey's room. When his alarm alerts him, Joey flees, but Nanny grabs him, knocks him out, and places him in a filling bathtub. However, confronted with the traumatic memory of Susy, she breaks down and pulls Joey from the water.

Later, at the hospital, Dr. Medman informs Virginia that Nanny is mentally ill and will receive long-term psychiatric care. Virginia tells Joey she knows the truth. Joey, no longer withdrawn or fearful, embraces his mother like a normal, happy child.

== Cast ==
Actor/Actress	Role
Bette Davis	Nanny
William Dix	Joey Fane
Wendy Craig	Virginia "Virgie" Fane
Jill Bennett	Aunt Pen
James Villiers	Bill Fane
Pamela Franklin	Bobbie Medman
Jack Watling	Dr. Medman
Maurice Denham	Dr. Beamaster
Alfred Burke	Dr. Wills
Angharad Aubrey	Susy Fane
Harry Fowler	Milkman

== Production ==
It was one of several films Seth Holt directed for Hammer.

== Reception ==
=== Box office ===
According to Fox accounts, the movie needed to earn $1,300,000 in rentals to break even and made $2,175,000, meaning it made a net profit.

The movie screening rights were sold to American television for nearly $400,000.

=== Critical ===
The Monthly Film Bulletin wrote: "The standard ending of a Bette Davis film these days is her departure for the mad-house. That, at least, is what one presumes is her fate at the conclusion of The Nanny; but the film ends on something of a dying fall, fading quietly away just as we expect to see Miss Davis in full maniac stride. Perhaps everyone felt that enough was enough; and this Hammer Horror is in fact so muted that one feels there may have been a certain tentativeness about tackling a subject which plays with only two possibilities – monster child or trusted nanny as psychopathic case-histories. ... the keynote of the film is the Davis performance – the quietest and most restrained since Baby Jane started this cycle. Whether feeding ducks in the park, preparing goodies for the outrageous Joey to reject, or explaining patiently to the dying Aunt Pen that of course she can't possibly give her the medicine, Bette Davis maintains the sweetly-smiling confidence of someone who knows that she is the most rational member of the household. ... Seth Holt's direction works best when tensions are being established – the edgy opening, for instance, with husband and wife fighting behind half-closed doors, Joey discovered in appalling misdeeds at the school, and Nanny beamingly serving a dinner nobody eats. When it comes to working the tensions out, there's some hesitation over just how monstrous everyone is supposed to be. The result is a mixture of non-horrific horror film and half-cock psychological exercise – watchable on both levels, not ape working on either, and with the confusions seeming to spring from the way the novel has been toned down in the script. Apart from Miss Davis, there's a performance of remarkable surly aplomb by 10-year-old William Dix, who seems almost alarmingly in control of his situation."

The Radio Times Guide to Films gave the film 3/5 stars, writing: "The first of two movies Bette Davis made for Britain's Hammer films is a genuinely chilling horror tale, with a clever plot written by Hammer regular Jimmy Sangster. However, movie purists may well object to the fact that the flashbacks reveal incidents that never actually happened, manipulating the expectations of the audience. Despite valiant work from Davis and director Seth Holt, the narrative weaknesses and the general unpleasantness of the piece spoil what could have been an interesting addition to the genre."

Leslie Halliwell said: "Muted Hammer experiment in psychopathology, with too much equivocation before the dénouement; the star's role allows few fireworks, and the plot is rather unpleasant."

It holds a 91% approval rating on movie review aggregator website Rotten Tomatoes based on eleven reviews.

AllMovie called it "one of Hammer Films' better non-supernatural outings of the 1960s".

== See also ==
- Psycho-biddy
- What Ever Happened to Baby Jane?
