= Jill Bennett (British actress) =

British actress (1926–1990)

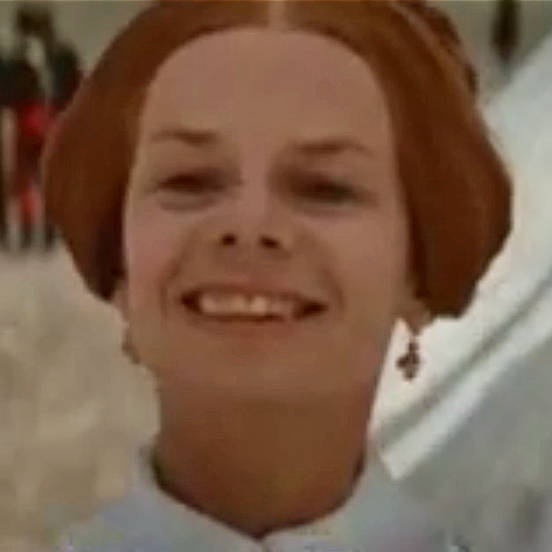
- Bennett in trailer for The Charge of the Light Brigade (1968)
- Born: Nora Noel Jill Bennett; 24 December 1926; Penang, Straits Settlements (present-day Malaysia)
- Died: 4 October 1990 (aged 63); London, England
- Occupation: Actress
- Years active: 1947–1990
- Spouses: Willis Hall (m. 1962; div. 1965) John Osborne (m. 1968; div. 1978)

Nora Noel Jill Bennett (24 December 1926 – 4 October 1990) (Note: Bennett's death certificate records her as having been born on 24 December 1931. But her Oxford Dictionary of National Biography entry claims that passenger lists from Penang confirm she was actually born in 1926. Bennett was, the DNB goes on, "reticent about her date of birth" while she was alive.) was a British actress.

== Early life and education ==
Jill Bennett was born in Penang, the Straits Settlements, to "wealthy Scottish parents" who owned a rubber plantation. She was educated at Prior's Field School, an independent girls boarding school in Godalming, from which she was expelled when she was fourteen. She attended RADA from 1944 to 1946.

== Career ==
Bennett made her West End debut in Now Barabbas in March 1947, was a company member during the 1949 season at the Shakespeare Memorial Theatre in Stratford upon Avon, and made her first film, The Long Dark Hall with Rex Harrison, in 1950.

She made many appearances in British films, including Lust for Life (1956), The Criminal (1960), The Nanny (1965), The Skull (1965), Inadmissible Evidence (1968), The Charge of the Light Brigade (1968), Julius Caesar (1970), I Want What I Want (1972), Mister Quilp (1975), Full Circle (1977) and Britannia Hospital (1982). She also appeared in the Bond film For Your Eyes Only (1981), Lady Jane (1986) and Hawks (1988). Her final film performance was in The Sheltering Sky (1990).

She made forays into television, such as roles in Play for Today (Country, 1981), with Wendy Hiller, and as the colourful Lady Grace Fanner in John Mortimer's adaptation of his own novel, Paradise Postponed (1985). In 1984 she co-wrote and starred in the sitcom Poor Little Rich Girls alongside Maria Aitken. Among several roles, her husband John Osborne wrote the character of Annie in his play The Hotel in Amsterdam (1968) for her but Bennett's busy schedule prevented her from playing the role until it was screened on television in 1971.

She co-starred with Rachel Roberts in the Alan Bennett television play The Old Crowd (1979), directed by Lindsay Anderson.

== Personal life ==
Bennett was the live-in companion of actor Godfrey Tearle in the late 1940s and early 1950s. She was married to screenwriter Willis Hall and later to John Osborne. Bennett and Osborne divorced, acrimoniously, in 1978. She had no children.

== Death ==
Bennett died by suicide on 4 October 1990, aged 63, (Note: Her death certificate recorded her age as 58, but this was on the basis of an erroneous birth date. See note a.) having long suffered from depression and the brutalising effects of her marriage to Osborne (according to Osborne's biographer). She did this by taking an overdose of Quinalbarbitone. Her death took place at home, 23 Gloucester Walk, Kensington, London W8, and she left an estate valued at £596,978.

Osborne, who was subject during her life to a restraining order regarding written comments about her, immediately wrote a vituperative chapter about her to be added to the second volume of his autobiography. The chapter, in which he rejoiced at her death, caused great controversy.

In 1992, Bennett's ashes, along with those of her friend, the actress Rachel Roberts (who also died by suicide, in 1980), were scattered by their friend Lindsay Anderson on the waters of the River Thames in London. Anderson, with several of the two actresses' professional colleagues and friends, took a boat trip down the Thames, and the ashes were scattered while musician Alan Price sang the song "Is That All There Is?" The event was included in Anderson's autobiographical BBC documentary Is That All There Is? (1992).

== Filmography ==
=== Film ===
Year	Title	Role	Notes
1951	The Long Dark Hall	First Murdered Girl	
1952	Moulin Rouge	Sarah	
1953	The Nine Days' Wonder	Miss Smith	TV film
1953	The Pleasure Garden	Miss Kellerman	Short
1954	Hell Below Zero	Gerda Petersen	
1954	Aunt Clara	Julie Mason	
1955	Murder Anonymous	Mrs. Sheldon	Short
1956	The Anatomist	Mary Belle	TV film
1956	The Extra Day	Susan	
1956	Lust for Life	Willemien	
1957	Peace and Quiet	Josephine Elliott	TV film
1959	A Glimpse of the Sea	Penelope Belford	TV film
1960	Return to the Sea	Penelope Belford	TV film
1960	The Criminal	Maggie	
1965	The Skull	Jane Maitland	
1965	The Nanny	Aunt Pen	
1968	The Charge of the Light Brigade	Mrs. Duberly	
1968	Inadmissible Evidence	Liz Eaves	
1969	Rembrandt	Geertje	TV film
1970	Julius Caesar	Calpurnia	
1971	Speaking of Murder	Annabelle Logan	TV film
1972	I Want What I Want	Margaret Stevenson	
1974	Intent to Murder	Janet Preston	TV film
1975	Mister Quilp	Sally Brass	
1976	Almost a Vision	Isobel	TV film
1977	Full Circle	Lily Lofting	
1979	The Old Crowd	Stella	TV film
1981	For Your Eyes Only	Brink	
1982	Britannia Hospital	Dr. MacMillan	
1983	The Aerodrome	Eustasia	TV film
1986	Lady Jane	Mrs. Ellen	
1988	Hawks	Vivian Bancroft	
1989	A Day in Summer	Miss Prosser	TV film
1990	The Sheltering Sky	Mrs. Lyle	

=== Television ===
Year	Title	Role	Notes
1954	BBC Sunday-Night Theatre	Polly Eccles	Episode: "Caste"
1954	BBC Sunday-Night Theatre	Lady Ariadne Crofield	Episode: "Job for the Boy"
1955	BBC Sunday-Night Theatre	Valerie Fergusson	Episode: "A Dream of Treason"
1955	BBC Sunday-Night Theatre	Sally Raynor	Episode: "Night Was Our Friend"
1956	ITV Play of the Week	Mary Belle	Episode: "The Anatomist"
1956	ITV Play of the Week	Masha	Episode: "The Seagull"
1956	Armchair Theatre	Isa	Episode: "Ring Out the Old"
1957	BBC Sunday-Night Theatre	Grette Brinson	Episode: "Do It Yourself"
1957	Villette	Lucy Snowe	Mini-series
1957	Do it Yourself	Assistant	
1958	Armchair Theatre	Agnes Madinier	Episode: "The Web of Lace"
1958	BBC Sunday-Night Theatre	Barbara Shearer	Episode: "Statue of David"
1958	BBC Sunday-Night Theatre	Catherine Sloper	Episode: "The Heiress"
1959	BBC Sunday-Night Theatre	Anne-Marie	Episode: "Figure of Fun"
1959	Saturday Playhouse	Trilby O'Ferral	Episode: "Trilby"
1959	Armchair Theatre	Lily	Episode: "Hand in Glove"
1960	Armchair Theatre	Stella	Episode: "Thunder on the Snowy"
1960	ITV Playhouse	Rena	Episode: "Other People's House"
1960	ITV Playhouse	Emily Forsyth	Episode: "Independent Means"
1960	Somerset Maugham Hour	Annette	Episode: "The Unconquered"
1960	Somerset Maugham Hour	Millicent	Episode: "Before the Party"
1961	ITV Play of the Week	Emma Gore	Episode: "Ring of Truth"
1961	ITV Play of the Week	Harriet	Episode: "Harriet"
1962	Somerset Maugham Hour	Olive Hardy	Episode: "The Book Bag"
1962	The Cheaters	Ferba Martinez	Episode: "Time to Kill"
1962	BBC Sunday-Night Play	Victoria Thomson	Episode: "Storm in Teacup"
1963	BBC Sunday-Night Play	Hilary	Episode: "The Sponge Room"
1963	Maupassant		Episode: "Foolish Wives"
1963	ITV Play of the Week	Lizzie	Episode: "The Rainmaker"
1963	ITV Play of the Week	Masha	Episode: "Three Sisters"
1964	Espionage	Mistress Patience Wright	Episode: "The Frantick Rebel"
1964	First Night	Libby Beeston	Episode: "How Many Angels"
1964	ITV Play of the Week	Helena	Episode: "A Midsummer's Night Dream"
1964	ITV Play of the Week	Gilda	Episode: "A Choice of Coward #4: Design for Living"
1965	ITV Play of the Week	Marjorie Wilton	Episode: "We Thought You'd Like to Be Caesar"
1966	ABC Stage 67	Frida Holmeier	Episode: "Dare I Weep, Dare I Mourn?"
1966	Thirty-Minute Theatre	Mary Hass	Episode: "Brainscrew"
1968	BBC Play of the Month	Anna	Episode: "The Parachute"
1968	Half Hour Story	Penelope	Episode: "Its Only Us"
1971	ITV Sunday Night Theatre		Episode: "The Hotel in Amsterdam"
1974	Late Night Drama	Jill	Episode: "Ms or Jill and Jack"
1975	Aquarius	Maria	Episode: "The Three Marias"
1976	Murder	Lola	Episode: "Hello Lola"
1980	Orient-Express	Jane	Episode: "Jane"
1981	Play for Today	Alice Carlion	Episode: "Country"
1984	Poor Little Rich Girls	Daisy Troop	Series regular
1985	Time for Murder	Sonia Barrington	Episode: "The Murders at Lynch Cross"
1986	Paradise Postponed	Lady Grace Fanner	Series regular
1987	Worlds Beyond	Elizabeth Berrington	Episode: "The Barrington Case"

== Theatre career ==
- repertory season with Arthur Brough Players, Leas Pavilion Folkestone, starting in April 1946
- Kitty in Now Barabbas, New Boltons and Vaudeville Theatres, London, February 1947
- Shakespeare Memorial Theatre, Stratford upon Avon, 1949 season; including Fleance in Macbeth and Bianca in Othello
- Titania in A Midsummer Night's Dream, St Martin's Theatre, December 1949
- Anni in Captain Carvallo, St James's Theatre, August 1950
- Iras in Caesar and Cleopatra and Antony and Cleopatra, St James's Theatre, May 1951
- Mary in The Trial of Mr. Pickwick, Westminster Theatre, May 1952
- Muslin in The Way to Keep Him, Arts Theatre, July 1952
- Helen Eliot in The Night of the Ball, New Theatre, January 1955
- Jane in Starlight, Theatre Royal Windsor and tour, March 1956
- Masha in The Seagull, Saville Theatre, August 1956
- Mrs Martin in The Bald Prima Donna, Arts Theatre, November 1956
- Sarah Stanham in The Touch of Fear, Aldwych Theatre, December 1956
- Isabelle in Dinner With the Family, New Theatre, December 1957
- Stella in Dispersal, Belgrade Theatre Coventry, June 1959
- Penelope in Last Day in Dreamland and A Glimpse of the Sea, Lyric Hammersmith, November 1959
- Anna in Anna Christie, Oxford Playhouse, March 1960
- Susan Roper in Breakfast for One, Arts Theatre, April 1961
- Feemy Evans in The Showing Up of Blanco Posnet and Lavinia in Androcles and the Lion, Mermaid Theatre, October 1961
- Estelle in In Camera (Huis Clos), Oxford Playhouse, February 1962
- Ophelia in Castle in Sweden, Piccadilly Theatre, May 1962
- Hilary in The Sponge Room and Elizabeth Mintey in Squat Betty, Royal Court, December 1962
- Isabelle in The Love Game, Arts Theatre, October 1964
- Countess Sophia Delyanoff in A Patriot for Me, Royal Court, June 1965
- Anna Bowers in A Lily in Little India, Hampstead Theatre Club, November 1965
- Imogen Parrott in Trelawny of the "Wells" (taking over from Pauline Taylor), National Theatre at the Old Vic, August 1966
- Katerina in The Storm, National Theatre at the Old Vic, October 1966
- Pamela in Time Present, Royal Court, May 1968; Duke of York's Theatre, July 1968 (for which she won the Variety Club and Evening Standard Awards for Best Actress)
- Anna Bowers in Three Months Gone, Royal Court January 1970; Duchess Theatre March 1970
- Frederica in West of Suez, Royal Court, August 1971; Cambridge Theatre, October 1971
- Hedda in Hedda Gabler, Royal Court, June 1972
- Leslie Crosbie in The Letter, Palace Theatre Watford, June 1973
- Amanda in Private Lives (taking over from Maggie Smith), Queen's Theatre, July 1973
- Isobel Sands in The End of Me Old Cigar, Greenwich Theatre, January 1975
- Fay in Loot, Royal Court, June 1975
- Sally Prosser in Watch It Come Down, National Theatre at the Old Vic, February 1976; March 1976 Lyttelton Theatre
- Mrs Shankland and Miss Railton-Bell in Separate Tables, Apollo Theatre, January 1977
- Miss Tina in The Aspern Papers, Chichester Festival Theatre, July 1978
- The Queen in The Eagle Has Two Heads (L'Aigle à deux têtes), Chichester Festival Theatre, May 1979
- Maggie Cutler in The Man Who Came to Dinner, Chichester Festival Theatre, July 1979
- Gertrude in Hamlet, Royal Court, April 1980
- Regina Giddens in The Little Foxes, Nottingham Playhouse and York Theatre Royal, March 1981
- Alice in The Dance of Death, Royal Exchange Manchester, October 1983
- Janine in Infidelities, Edinburgh Festival Fringe, August 1985; Donmar Warehouse, October 1985; Boulevard Theatre, June 1986
- Queen Elizabeth I in Mary Stuart, Edinburgh Festival, August 1987
- Miss Singer in Exceptions, New End Theatre Hampstead, July 1988
- Anne in Poor Nanny, King's Head Theatre Islington, March 1989

== Radio theatre ==
- Nora in A Doll's House, BBC Third Programme 1959. Directed by Frederick Bradnum. Cast included Jack May and John Gabriel.
- Masha in Three Sisters, BBC Home Service Radio 1965. Directed by John Tydeman. Cast included Paul Scofield, Ian McKellen, Lynn Redgrave and Wilfrid Lawson.

== Theatre sources ==
- Who’s Who in the Theatre, 17th Edition, Vol. 1. (Gale Research, 1981.)
- 25 Years of the English Stage Company at the Royal Court, Richard Findlater, ed. (Amber Lane Press, 1981.)
- Theatre Record (periodical indexes)
