= Alf Stewart =

Fictional character from Home and Away

- Home and Away character
- Portrayed by: Ray Meagher; Max Buckley (flashback); Robert Jago (flashback)
- Duration: 1988–present
- First appearance: 17 January 1988
- Introduced by: Alan Bateman
In-universe information
- Occupation: Caravan Park owner; Bottle shop owner; Bait shop owner; General Store owner; Surf Club committee member; Co-owner of the Beachside Diner; Barman; Fisherman
- Father: Gordon Stewart
- Mother: Sarah-Jane Stewart
- Sisters: Morag Bellingham; Celia Stewart; Barbara Stewart; Debra Stewart
- Half-sisters: Colleen Smart
- Wife: Martha Stewart (1969–1985, 2020–); Ailsa Hogan (1988–2000)
- Sons: Owen Dalby; Duncan Stewart
- Daughters: Quinn Jackson; Roo Stewart
- Stepdaughters: Shauna Bradley
- Grandsons: Ric Dalby; Bryce Stewart; Ryder Jackson
- Granddaughters: Martha MacKenzie
- Grandfathers: Angus Stewart
- Nephews: Lance Smart; Alan Fisher
- Nieces: Maureen Evans; Rebecca Nash; Bobby Simpson
- First cousins: Jennifer Atkinson
- Other relatives: Seb Miller; Sam Marshall

Alfred James "Alf" Stewart is a fictional character from the Australian soap opera Home and Away, played by Ray Meagher. Alf was created as one of the show's eighteen original characters. Meagher auditioned for the role of Tom Fletcher, before being cast as Alf. He made his first appearance during the pilot episode broadcast on 17 January 1988. As of 2026, Meagher is the sole remaining original cast member and he holds a Guinness World Record for being the longest-serving actor in an Australian serial. For his portrayal of Alf, Meagher won the Gold Logie Award for Most Popular Personality on Australian Television in 2010.

== Casting ==
Meagher was cast after appearing as a supporting character in numerous roles. He was one of only eight older actors cast in the serial's original line up. Upon receiving his first regular role, Meagher said, "It's good for me to play someone like that after all the other blokes." During an interview published on the Channel 5 website, Meagher revealed that he did not audition for Alf and the producers originally saw him for the role of Tom Fletcher (eventually played by Roger Oakley).

Meagher holds a Guinness World Record as the longest-serving actor in an Australian serial for portraying Alf since 1988. As of 2011 he is the only remaining original cast member still present. During flashbacks to the character's past, younger versions of Alf have been portrayed by Max Buckley and Robert Jago respectively.

In April 2010, it was announced Meagher was taking a break from Home and Away, so he could travel to London to star in the West End production of Priscilla Queen of the Desert. Meagher said "[Home and Away] have very generously allowed me to do Priscilla in the West End from 20 September roughly until early March." Meagher returned to the West End in October 2011. However, the actor, whose contract was up for renewal in 2012, said he was committed to staying in Home and Away because he still enjoyed the role of Alf. Meagher is the only cast member whose contract entitles him to extra holidays.

In February 2013, Meagher told a reporter from the AAP that he had signed a five-year contract with Home and Away. But he is allowed to leave providing he gives six months notice. In September 2018, Meagher reprised his role as Bob in Priscilla Queen of the Desert for six weeks. Meagher revealed that he had been offered the part 18 months prior, but had to turn it down due to his filming commitments with Home and Away. He stated, "When I was offered it, it was difficult to fit in with Home and Away, so having said 'thanks, but no thanks' I thought about it and wondered if they would allow me to only do Brisbane." Meagher also revealed that he had just signed another three-year contract with Home and Away.

On 17 January 2023, Home and Away celebrated its 35th anniversary and Meagher, the only original cast member still in the show, announced that he had signed a new five-year contract. He admitted that "the people" was the reason he had remained with the serial for so long, explaining "We've got a wonderful crew and some of them have nearly been there as long as me. We have some wonderful actors who are now in the 10, 15 and 20 year bracket, and by and large I've thoroughly enjoyed my time on the show." Meagher revealed that his new contract allowed him to work less weeks and give him some extra time, but he made it clear that it was not leading to his retirement.

== Development ==
In his early years Alf was described as a "good-natured rogue with a finger in every pie." Meagher said that although some people think he is miserable, he sees him as an "upstanding member of the community". He further added "He can be a bit grumpy and gets stuck into people and you have to be quick to catch his apology if he is wrong, but on the whole he is a big softie."

Alf has shown a keen interest in business. Whilst serving on the Surf Club Committee, he also works as a bartender. He also owns a bait shop and takes part in recreational fishing. Meagher often changes dialogue to suit Alf's speech.

Alf's first on-screen relationship is with Ailsa Hogan (Judy Nunn). Writers decided that the pair would marry early on. When filming began heavy rain disrupted filming for two weeks. Nunn almost missed her own wedding due to the producers trying to get her film.

Meagher has stated that Alf's most memorable storyline is when he develops a brain tumour. He had to film the scenes twice, once with his co-star Nunn and the other without. Meagher said that it was an emotional experience.

Alf's relationship with sister Morag Bellingham (Cornelia Frances) has often been strained. There has been a lots of fights and antagonism between the pair. Morag later softens towards him after they reach an understanding. Frances said: "underneath she will always care for him and look after him." Frances felt it perhaps not the best development because she enjoyed their "wonderful fights".

Alf's life changed when he was reunited with his teenage sweetheart Viv Standish (Maggie Kirkpatrick), who told Alf that she had given birth to their son, Owen, and put him up for adoption. Alf then learned that Owen had died after being attacked by his son Eric "Ric" Dalby (Mark Furze). Alf attends Owen's funeral and when he sees his grandson, he is tempted to approach him, but he decided to take Morag's advice and wait. Meagher stated, "Alf feels a responsibility to this kid, especially since his dad was a ratbag. Alf's also been a bit of a failure in the fatherhood department, so in a way, Eric is a life raft – a way for him to make up for the past."

== Storylines ==
=== Backstory ===
Alf grew up in Summer Bay and took an interest in business. His father Gordon and Scottish grandfather Angus also lived in the Bay. By the time he was thirty, he owned the Summer Bay Liquor Store, the Summer Bay Caravan Park, a boat hire service and a yacht brokerage. Alf married a local woman called Martha Baldivis and they moved into the Summer Bay House at the Caravan Park. They had a daughter called Ruth. In 1985, Martha drowned and Alf decided that he could no longer live there and he let the Caravan Park decline, but looked after the house. He met Ailsa and they began dating, despite Ruth's dislike of her. Alf decides to sell the business and home to the Fletcher family.

=== 1988– ===
Alf first appears in the pilot episode of the show, in which he sells the Summer Bay Caravan Park to Tom and Pippa Fletcher, unable to cope with living there following the death of his wife, Martha, three years earlier. By now Alf is involved in a relationship with general store owner Ailsa, who he marries in 1988, despite the disapproval of his daughter Ruth (Roo) and the revelation that Ailsa was convicted of the murder of her abusive father.

After briefly separating, Alf and Ailsa reunite in late 1988, unexpectedly becoming parents to Duncan the following year. Alf later discovers he has a daughter, Quinn Jackson, from a previous relationship, but she rejects her father. In 2000, Ailsa reveals she also has another child, conceived after she was raped by a prison guard. This child turns out to be Shauna Bradley, who already lives in Summer Bay.

In 2001 Ailsa collapses and dies suddenly as the result of an undiscovered heart condition. Two years later a still distraught Alf has a nervous breakdown and begins seeing visions of his dead wife. It's later discovered he has a brain tumour.

In 2004 Alf discovers he has another long-lost child when he is reunited with his terminally ill former girlfriend, Viv Standish. The revelation leads Alf to realise local bad boy Eric Dalby, whom he loathes, is his grandson. After a difficult start the two build a relationship. The following year Alf is reunited with yet another long-lost family member when Roo introduces him to Martha, the daughter she gave up for adoption in 1988.

In 2008, Alf is left upset when his best friend Sally Fletcher decides to leave the Bay. Sally and her daughter return to the Bay five years later, and she reveals that her daughter is dying and the only way to save her is to go to America for treatment. Alf helps her raise the money for the treatment.

In 2010, Alf and his friends were stalked by Penn Graham, the son of a married woman Alf had an affair with in between his first wife dying and meeting his second wife Alisa.

Alf decides to visit the Canberra war memorial with some students when he realises they do not care about ANZAC Day. As he looks around the memorial, he starts to suffer flashbacks to his time in Vietnam. Later that night, the students and Alf sleep outdoors in trenches as part of the war experience. Alf continues to suffer flashbacks and wanders off by himself, before collapsing. He is taken to the hospital and diagnosed with PTSD. He initially refuses to deal with it, but eventually opens up to a therapist.

== In popular culture ==
One of the character's most noted traits is his use of Australian slang and bush expressions, including "flamin galah", "stone the flamin' crows", and "strike me roan". In 2014, Stephanie Packer of the Herald Sun reported that the use of slang words, like those favoured by Alf, was decreasing in Australia, and television was one of the only remaining places to hear them.

In 2010, a video featuring a parody version of the character was created and posted online by an artist known as "Mr Doodleburger". The parody showed a dark and sinister parallel universe/alternate version of the character, who would routinely torture people and kept a variety of characters from this parallel version of Home and Away in his "rape dungeon".

The videos featuring the character were created by using original footage from Home and Away, with new voice tracks added in. The parody was successful, with the initial clip receiving 5.4 million views. It also developed a cult following. A Facebook page dedicated to the videos was soon set up. News outlets claimed the Facebook page and the videos were pro-rape, leading for some to call for the social networking site to be more closely monitored. However, other sections of the media have pointed out that the Facebook page is merely a reference to the parody videos, and not promoting rape at all.

== Reception ==
For his portrayal of Alf, Meagher was nominated for Most Popular Actor at the 2008 Digital Spy Soap Awards. In 2010, Meagher won the Gold Logie at the Logie Awards. He was also nominated for Most Popular Actor. Meagher won the Most Popular Actor Logie Award in 2018. That same year, he won Best Daytime Star at the Inside Soap Awards. Meagher received a nomination for Most Popular Actor at the 2019 Logie Awards. In 2022, Meagher received nominations for the Gold Logie for Most Popular Personality on Australian Television and Most Popular Actor. The following year, he received a nominated for Most Popular Actor.

The episode featuring Alf's breakdown following the suicide of an army mate, Jeff Marshall, who served with him in Vietnam, won the 1998 Australian Film Institute Award for Best Episode in a Television Drama Serial and was presented to director Russell Webb. The episode featuring Alf's late wife Ailsa showing him a vision of Summer Bay without him won the 2003 Australian Writers' Guild Award for Best Episode in a Television Serial. It was presented to the episode's writer Coral Drouyn.

Robin Oliver from The Sydney Morning Herald said that Alf and Ailsa formed a "terrific partnership". Rosemarie Milsome of the Newcastle Herald was critical of Alf's treatment of Chloe Richards breastfeeding her newborn daughter Olivia in the diner, labelling him "The stereotypical ocker middle-aged male; judgmental, laconic and a pain in the backside." She added: "I thought Chloe should have decked Alf, but then I tend to fly off the handle and, anyway, it would have been difficult for her to have a good swing with a baby attached to her nipple." Holy Soap have said that Alf's most memorable moment is "The classic episode ripping off It's A Wonderful Life, in which Alf, in the middle of a brain tumour operation, is led through Summer Bay history as if he had never existed." They also describe him as "the Lou Carpenter of Summer Bay, a miserable but lovable legend who will never leave." Hampshire culture website Get Hampshire branded Alf a "legendary misery-guts". They also said he is commonly known for his use of declining Australian slang with sayings such as "flamin' mongrel".

Yahoo!7 opined he had become "a TV icon" for using his catchphrases such as "flamin'" and "strewth". In Catherine Deveny's book "It's not my fault they print them" she joked that she was distressed after watching three episodes of Home and Away and not hearing Alf say "flaming mongrels". Virgin Media have also agreed he is "lover of stereotypical Aussie slang", stating "Stone the flamin' crows!" has been one of his typical lines. They added that their favourite was "Yer flamin' great galah!" They also said "There's no doubt Alf is loved, despite being a bit of a rogue with a finger in every pie." They went on to describe him as the "godfather of Summer Bay" and "Grumpy but kind and good natured." Geoff Mayer, Brian McFlarne and Ina Bertrand said in their book "The Oxford companion to Australian film" that Meagher's roles have epitomised the rough-hewn, knockabout Australian character. They said he portrays the persona in Alf and brands him a popular character.

In November 2021, three critics for The West Australian placed Alf in first place in their feature on the "Top 50 heroes we love and villains we hate" from Home and Away. Praising the character, they wrote: "Stone the flamin' crows, if Alf Stewart isn't Australia's most iconic TV character of all time then we don't know who is. Alf was one of the show's original 18 characters when Home and Away launched in 1988 and strewth, would you believe Meagher now holds a Guinness World Record for being the longest-serving actor in an Australian series? Alf is beloved for his no-nonsense approach, his fondness for ocker headwear, dishing out advice (whether wanted or not) and his many catchphrases. including 'flamin' galah!'. The day Meagher retires and Alf is killed off will likely be a day of national mourning."

At the end of 2023, TV Week readers named Alf as the Greatest Australian TV Character. Summing up why he was chosen, a writer for the publication stated: "Could there be a more popular No 1? For more than three decades, Alf has been a constant on our screens. Viewers love his gruff, no-nonsense attitude and colourful quips, with some of his utterances – such as 'Strewth!', 'Stone the flamin' crows' and 'Ya flamin' galah' – becoming part of popular culture. He even has his own figure at Madame Tussauds waxworks! Loved by all in Summer Bay, he's often a sounding board for the locals, and should anyone be in need of a yarn or advice, you'll find him at the nearest wharf, fishing rod in hand. We've watched him fall in love, gasped at his close shaves with catastrophe, and savoured his homespun wisdom. We love you, Alf!"
