= A Case to Answer =

1947 novel

- Author: Edgar Lustgarten
- Language: English
- Genre: Crime
- Publisher: Eyre & Spottiswoode
- Publication date: 1947
- Publication place: United Kingdom
- Media type: Print

A Case to Answer is a 1947 crime novel by the British writer Edgar Lustgarten. It was published in London by Eyre & Spottiswoode and in New York by Scribners under the alternative title One More Unfortunate. It portrays the trial of a young man for murdering a Soho prostitute.

== Film adaptation ==
In 1951 it was adapted into the British film The Long Dark Hall. Produced by London Films, it starred Rex Harrison and Lilli Palmer.

== Bibliography ==
- Breen, Jon L. Novel Verdicts: A Guide to Courtroom Fiction. Scarecrow Press, 1999.
- Grant, John. A Comprehensive Encyclopedia of Film Noir: The Essential Reference Guide. Rowman & Littlefield, 2023.
- Reilly, John M. Twentieth Century Crime & Mystery Writers. Springer, 2015.
- White, Terry. Justice Denoted: The Legal Thriller in American, British, and Continental Courtroom Literature. Praeger, 2003.
