= Scotland Yard (film series) =

British short film series (1953–1961)

- Genre: crime drama
- Presented by: Edgar Lustgarten
- Starring: Edgar Lustgarten; Russell Napier
- Country of origin: United Kingdom
- Original language: English
- No. of seasons: 1
- No. of episodes: 39

Production
- Running time: 30 minutes

Original release
- Network: ABC
- Release: 1953 – 1961

Scotland Yard is a series of 39 half-hour episodes produced by Anglo-Amalgamated. Produced between 1953 and 1961, they are short films, originally made to support the main feature in a cinema double-bill. Each film focuses on a true crime case with names changed, and features an introduction by the crime writer Edgar Lustgarten.

The earlier films were produced by Alec C. Snowden, who was succeeded by Jack Greenwood. Directors included Ken Hughes and Montgomery Tully. The principal character in each film is a Detective Inspector, played by a variety of actors but most frequently by Russell Napier (usually portraying Detective Inspector Duggan). Many of the films feature, in supporting roles, actors later to become well-known. They include Jill Bennett, Peter Arne, Harry H. Corbett, James Villiers, Edward Judd, Arthur Lowe, Peter Halliday, Wilfrid Brambell, Rita Webb, Peter Bowles and Roger Delgado, and Jack Howarth

All of the episodes were shot at Merton Park Studios in London and on location on monochrome 35mm film. Most of the episodes were presented in the old Academy screen ratio of 1.33:1, whilst a handful of the later episodes were shot in a hard-matted widescreen ratio of 1.66:1.

The series later found a new audience on television in both the UK and the USA. The complete series has been released on DVD in the UK by Network. From 2017 it has been shown on the UK TV channel Talking Pictures TV.

== Episode list ==
Here is the list of Scotland Yard episodes (with their 25fps running times):

- ‘The Drayton Case’ (24:47)
- ‘The Missing Man’ (29:31)
- ‘The Candlelight Murder’ (31:24)
- ‘The Blazing Caravan’ (1954) (31:46)
- ‘The Dark Stairway’ (31:32)
- ‘Late Night Final’ (28:31)
- ‘Fatal Journey’ (30:08)
- ‘The Strange Case of Blondie’ (31:52)
- ‘The Silent Witness’ (31:50)
- ‘Passenger to Tokyo’ (31:14)
- ‘Night Plane to Amsterdam’ (30:34)
- ‘The Stateless Man’ (28:36)
- ‘The Mysterious Bullet’ (31:09)
- ‘Murder Anonymous’ (31:58)
- ‘The Wall of Death’ (30:22)
- ‘The Case of the River Morgue’ (32:16)
- ‘Destination Death’ (31:41)
- ‘Person Unknown’ (31:47)
- ‘The Lonely House’ (32:14)
- ‘Bullet from the Past’ (31:46)
- ‘Inside Information’ (30:40)
- ‘The Case of the Smiling Widow’ (31:33)
- ‘The Mail Van Murder’ (29:10)
- ‘The Tyburn Case’ (32:24)
- ‘The White Cliffs Mystery’ (32:20)
- ‘Night Crossing’ (31:50)
- ‘Print of Death’ (26:46)
- ‘Crime of Honour’ (26:46)
- ‘The Cross-Road Gallows’ (28:17)
- ‘The Unseeing Eye’ (27:39)
- ‘The Ghost Train Murder’ (31:19)
- ‘The Dover Road Mystery’ (29:05)
- ‘The Last Train’ (31:52)
- ‘Evidence in Concrete’ (28:03)
- ‘The Silent Weapon’ (27:18)
- ‘The Grand Junction Case’ (26:48)
- ‘The Never Never Murder’ (29:46)
- ‘Wings of Death’ (27:41)
- ‘The Square Mile Murder’ (27:39)

== Guest appearances ==
The real-life ballistics expert Robert Churchill appears in The Mysterious Bullet, and the barrister Travers Humphreys in Murder Anonymous.

Journalist and broadcaster Ludovic Kennedy plays a newsreader in The Lonely House. At this time, he was a newsreader for Independent Television News, but himself went on to investigate real-life crimes such as the Lindbergh kidnapping and the Derek Bentley case.

== USA TV scheduling ==
Scotland Yard aired at 10 p.m Eastern on ABC opposite The $64,000 Challenge on CBS and The Loretta Young Show on NBC. It was replaced on the 1958 autumn schedule by the five-week series Encounter, a drama anthology which originated from Toronto, Ontario, Canada.

The BBC television series of the same name broadcast in 1960, and the 1970s London Weekend Television series New Scotland Yard are unrelated to these films.
