= Sextette =

1978 US musical comedy film by Ken Hughes

- Poster art by Drew Struzan
- Directed by: Ken Hughes
- Screenplay by: Herbert Baker
- Story by: Charlotte Francis
- Based on: Sextette by Mae West
- Produced by: Daniel Briggs; Robert J. Sullivan; Harry Weiss
- Starring: Mae West; Timothy Dalton; Dom DeLuise; Tony Curtis; Ringo Starr; Keith Moon; George Hamilton; Alice Cooper; Walter Pidgeon
- Cinematography: James Crabe
- Edited by: Argyle Nelson Jr.
- Music by: Artie Butler
- Distributed by: Crown International Pictures
- Release date: March 2, 1978
- Running time: 91 minutes
- Country: United States
- Language: English
- Budget: $4 million–$8 million
- Box office: $50,000

Sextette is a 1978 American musical comedy film directed by Ken Hughes, and starring Mae West in her final film, alongside an ensemble cast including Timothy Dalton, Dom DeLuise, Tony Curtis, Ringo Starr, Keith Moon, George Hamilton, Alice Cooper, and Walter Pidgeon.

Produced by Daniel Briggs, Robert Sullivan, and Harry Weiss for the production company Briggs and Sullivan, the screenplay was dramatized for the screen by Herbert Baker, from West's final stage performance play of the same title, later renamed Sextet, which West herself had written (based on a story idea by Charlotte Francis) and originally performed in 1961. Costumes were designed by Edith Head.

Filmed at Paramount Studios, Sextette was West's final film, as well as that of Pidgeon and Moon. Featured were cameos by Rona Barrett, Regis Philbin, and George Raft, all of whom appeared as themselves. The film was a major box-office bomb, grossing just $50,000 against an estimated budget of $4–8 million.

== Plot ==
American actress and sex symbol Marlo Manners has just married for the sixth time. She and new husband Sir Michael Barrington depart for a honeymoon suite at a posh and exclusive London hotel reserved for them by her manager, Dan Turner. The hotel is also the location of an international conference, where leaders have come together to resolve tensions and problems that threaten the survival of the world. As chairman Mr. Chambers tries to call the meeting to order, the delegates are crowding to the windows in an effort to catch a glimpse of Marlo's arrival.

As they enter the lobby, Marlo, now Lady Barrington, and her husband, a knight, are swarmed by admirers and reporters. Once inside their suite, the couple are unable to consummate due to the constant demands of Marlo's career, such as interviews, dress fittings, and photo sessions, as well as the various men, including some former husbands, diplomat Alexei Andreyev Karansky, director Laslo Karolny, gangster Vance Norton, and an entire American athletic team, all of whom want to have sex with her.

Meanwhile, Turner desperately searches for an audiotape containing his client's memoirs to destroy it. Marlo has recorded extensive details about her affairs and scandals, with a lot of dirt about her husbands and lovers. Ex-husband Alexei, Russian delegate at the conference, threatens to derail the intense negotiations unless he can have another sexual encounter with her. Marlo is expected to work "undercover" to ensure world peace.

== Cast ==
- Mae West – Marlo Manners/Lady Barrington
- Timothy Dalton – Sir Michael Barrington
- Dom DeLuise – Dan Turner
- Tony Curtis – Alexei Andreyev Karansky
- Ringo Starr – Laslo Karolny
- George Hamilton – Vance Norton
- Alice Cooper – Waiter
- Van McCoy – Delegate
- Keith Moon – Dress Designer
- Walter Pidgeon – Mr. Chambers
- Rona Barrett – Herself
- Regis Philbin – Himself
- George Raft – Himself
- Gil Stratton – Himself

== Production ==
=== Source material ===
The film was based on a play by West, which she was talking about having written in 1954. The play debuted in 1961. Alan Marshall and Jack La Rue played her leading men. Marshall died during the run of the show after suffering a heart attack on stage during a performance of the play.

=== Development ===
In 1969, James Aubrey of MGM commissioned Leonard Spigelgass to write a script. In August 1969, West was filming Myra Breckinridge. She said she wanted Christopher Plummer to play one of her husbands in Sextette. However, filming did not proceed. Funds were eventually raised by Danile Briggs, daughter of a Stauffer Chemicals heiress.

In March 1976, Sextette reportedly would be produced for $4.8 million, with West receiving $1 million. Four months later, in July 1976, the film was reported in fact to be made for $1.5 million, with West getting $250,000 and 20% of the profits. Irving Rapper was to direct and Universal had first right of refusal as distributor.

West said Baker worked as the screenwriter "An' puttin' in the camera shots. I can do that myself, but it's tedious work. He's not writin' my lines, though. Nobody can do that." AJ Palmerio said he wrote the script that got the film financed, but he is not credited on the movie.

=== Casting ===
West was reportedly in search of a leading man along the lines of Cary Grant, with whom she had co-starred in She Done Him Wrong. Filming was to start in August. About 150 unknowns auditioned on one day. Over a thousand men ended up auditioning. In August, Timothy Dalton was cast after West saw him in Wuthering Heights; 18 smaller roles went to the auditionees. "I do the role I always do," said West. "I do Mae West... You see me. I take care of myself don't drink or smoke. I've kept my looks." "The script is very funny," said Dalton. "It really is a celebration of Mae West."

=== Pre-production ===
Two weeks before filming began, Ken Hughes replaced Irving Rapper as director.

=== Filming ===
Principal photography finally commenced in December 1976 at Paramount Studios. The film soon became the source of several urban legends. One such persistent rumor is that the then-83 year old West could not remember any of her lines and had to wear a concealed earpiece under her wig to have her lines fed to her. Tony Curtis later commented that West could not hear well, thus requiring the earpiece. Creatively rewriting the story for dramatic effect, in an episode of the program The Dame Edna Experience, he said that because of the frequency of her earpiece, she accidentally picked up police-radio frequencies, and at one point mistakenly stated, "There's a 608!"

In reality, West wore an earpiece so Hughes could feed her lines. Hughes had rewritten most of the dialogue because West and he both felt the script was weak. As a result, West had no time to study the script to memorize her lines. Hughes repeatedly debunked the urban legend that West's earpiece picked up police signals and that West repeated them.

Hughes later stated that with hearing loss, West was unable to take direction, which caused problems in filming. He recalled one incident involving a scene of West in an elevator, which took an entire day to film. After its completion, Hughes wrapped for the day. West was not within hearing range to hear Hughes's call to wrap and remained in the closed elevator for half an hour before being let out.

Dalton had mixed feelings, but complimented West. "I admired her nerve, and enjoyed working with her - I was even interviewed by Rona Barrett in the picture! It was a real stretch for me, and frankly, after making love to a woman in her mid-80s, I knew I could handle any assignment!"

George Raft, who played himself, had been the star of West's first film, Night After Night, in 1932.

== Music ==
The film features eight songs, seven performed by the cast:

- "Marlo's Theme" (Van McCoy) – McCoy
- "Hooray for Hollywood" (Richard A. Whiting, Johnny Mercer) – Mae West and Chorus
- "Love Will Keep Us Together" (Neil Sedaka, Howard Greenfield) – Timothy Dalton and West
- "Honey Pie" (Lennon–McCartney) – Dom DeLuise
- "After You've Gone" (Turner Layton, Henry Creamer) – West
- "Happy Birthday Twenty-One" (Sedaka, Greenfield) – West
- "Baby Face" (Benny Davis, Harry Akst) – West
- "Next Next" (McCoy) – Alice Cooper

== Release ==
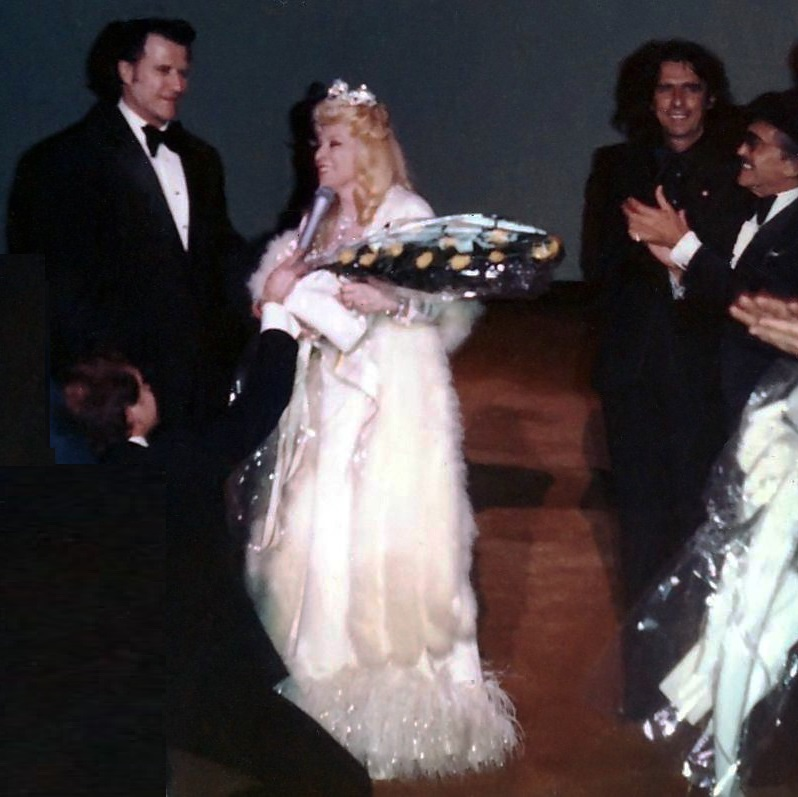
West gives a speech after the Cinerama Dome opening, with Paul Novak, Alice Cooper, Harry E. Weiss, and (kneeling in front of her) Dom DeLuise

Soon after filming ended, difficulty arose in finding a major distributor. As a result, several highly publicized sneak previews were scheduled to garner support. The first was held on the Paramount Pictures' lot and the second at the Fox Bruin Theater, where West received a standing ovation.

The producers ultimately decided to self-distribute. Sextette premiered at the Cinerama Dome in March 1978. West was moved when she was greeted by thousands of young fans there and in San Francisco. Arthur Knight wrote in The Hollywood Reporter about "a kind of odd gallantry in the octogenarian Mae's loyalty to her public".

=== Home media ===
Sextette was released on VHS by Media Home Entertainment in 1982. In April 2011, Scorpion Entertainment released the film on Region 1 DVD in the United States.

In July 2011, Sextette was released as part of Mill Creek Entertainment's Dangerous Babes, a budget-priced, three-DVD set that includes 11 other Crown Pictures films.

== Reception ==
=== Critical response ===
Upon its premiere, most critics panned the film. Variety dubbed it "a cruel, unnecessary, and mostly unfunny musical comedy." The New York Times' critic Vincent Canby called Sextette "embarrassing", and said, in reference to West, that "Granny should have her mouth washed out with soap, along with her teeth." Kevin Thomas of the Los Angeles Times said it "will be cherished by her fans." Stanley Eichelbaum of the San Francisco Examiner called the film "a foolish, vulgar, quite vulgar, but awfully funny musical comedy (the songs, too, are mostly old), in which West does more than a self-parody. She's a travesty of Mae West in an outlandish wardrobe by Edith Head."

Film critic Rex Reed (who starred with West in the film Myra Breckinridge and at that time was working for the New York Daily News) also gave the film a negative review, calling the film "a total, unbearable bomb, more like a training film for retired French whores than anything else." A critic at the same newspaper, Ann Guarino, gave the film a one-and-a-half star rating, saying that "at 86, [West] manages to bring back the tinsel glamor of her Hollywood days in 'Sextette,' adapted from one of her Broadway plays. Unfortunately, the result is a feeble, old-fashioned musical comedy that is something of a curio." Joseph Gelmis of Newsday called it "outrageous camp and low farce of a kind that isn’t seen very often in movies anymore." Amnon Kabatchnik of the Tallahassee Democrat said that "unfortunately, the legendary Mae West comes across as a pale imitation of her own image. There is something sad about an old woman clinging to her youthful foils without a nod to the passage of time. The various costume changes and her eternal prop a sizable fan cannot hide the dimming fire, the fading zest. Even her famous, purring delivery of lines like 'When I am good, I am very good, but when I am bad, I am better' has become too measured, a conscious effort to capture and capitalize on a past trademark. The audience senses the chasm between past and present, and somewhat ill at ease cannot relax at what otherwise would have been lightweight fare. After all, why should we root for connubial bliss between a young, handsome lord, and a white-faced woman four times his age?" Ron Bush of the Orlando Sentinel said "whoever persuaded Mae West to do a film based on her play 'Sextette' did her—and moviegoers—wrong." He added:

Back in 1970, Mae West said (in the revised edition of her autobiography Goodness Had Nothing to Do with It) she planned to film Sextette and a remake of She Done Him Wrong, the screen version of her play Diamond Lili and probably her best known film. Let's hope she rethinks that plan. She would do well to let the late-late show speak for her—through She Done Him Wrong, I'm No Angel, Belle of the Nineties, Klondike Annie, and My Little Chickadee.

Michael Blowen of The Boston Globe remarked that "the film creates the general ennui that one gets from going through a second-rate carnival freak show. There is a queasy mixture of disgust, pity and guilt that settles in the bottom of your stomach after watching Mae West's deficiencies being exploited for profit. But she is obviously exploiting herself." He added:

Other stars of her day gracefully accepted retirement. They settled into Beverly Hills and appear annually at the Academy Awards. That lifestyle was clearly not enough for West. Tragically, she never let go of the sex symbol identity that has-transformed her into an eccentric anomaly. Mae West is a sexual Peter Pan who's never grown up and "Sextette" is strictly for voyeuristic curiosity seekers.

John Burgess devoted a single paragraph to the film when he reviewed it at the 1979 Montreal World Film Festival for the Montreal Star. In the paragraph, he wrote:

It was about four o'clock yesterday afternoon and there I was alone—in a dark room—with Mae West. It was not a triumph! First of all, she was on the screen, and I was in an empty theatre, and secondly, she was appearing in what I pray is her final picture, Sextette. It looked as though the whole movie had been shot through a nylon stocking—the heel of a nylon stocking. The lady seemed out to prove that there is life after death and looked positively embalmed. The picture comes under the heading of 'must miss' movies.

In Australia, John Lapsley of The Sun-Herald gave the film only a one-star rating out of four, and said, "despite what you may think if you see Mae West in Sextette, medical opinion is that the aged sex star is certifiably alive. It is not considered nice to lambast an old lady, but as long as Mae West pretends she can play a sex-bombe—even tongue in cheek—she is young enough to make an ass of herself. Sextette is an occasionally musical comedy where the laughs are also occasional." Jesús Fernández Santos of the Spanish newspaper El País, reviewing the film after her death, remarked, "beyond the well-known plot, old songs, and new actors, there's something pathetic about Mae West holding onto the idea of a body when the body no longer exists."

A few critics, though, reacted more gently to the film. Chris Wienandt of the Abilene Reporter-News remarked, "Time is running out for Mae West's hourglass figure. But for a woman who was 86 when she made this film, she looks mighty good. Sextette, the film it took Mae almost 50 years to make, is atrocious. The acting is bad, the camera work is bad, the direction, the choreography, and the script is [sic] bad. This is the show Zero Mostel and Gene Wilder were looking for in The Producers — the worst show on the face of the earth — but like Springtime for Hitler, it's so bad, it's good. You can't criticize it because it can't be taken seriously." Clyde Gilmour of the Toronto Star called it "so brazenly bad that it can be outrageously enjoyed, from time to time anyway, as a definitive specimen of High Camp in entertainment."

Scott Cain of The Atlanta Journal had the most favorable response to the film, saying, "Mae West’s new movie Sextette is tacky, silly, unbelievable, and unforgivable. On the other hand, it's a barrel of laughs. I loved it. In their haste to denounce this picture, Mae's detractors conveniently overlook the fact that it is a farce. They forget that Mae has always been the first to laugh at herself. It's a whole lot easier to laugh with Mae than to laugh at her. I can't understand why people are so determined not to have a good time."

On Rotten Tomatoes, the film holds an approval rating of 25% based on 12 reviews, with an average rating of 4.8/10.

In a 2020 retrospective, Filmink said the film "is absurd, but almost compulsive in its randomness."

The film is listed in Golden Raspberry Award founder John Wilson's book The Official Razzie Movie Guide as one of the 100 Most Enjoyably Bad Movies Ever Made.

=== Box office ===
Sextette earned $31,000 in its first week, largely due to West's appearance at the premiere. The film earned about an additional $20,000 in the United States before being pulled from theaters. Against its budget of $4 million to $8 million, it was a box-office bomb.

Hughes later wrote, "May God bless Mae West. She was one of the great artists of the cinema. I am proud to have met her and to have worked with her. May she never be forgotten."
