= Now Barabbas =

- Directed by: Gordon Parry
- Written by: William Douglas Home (play); Anatole de Grunwald
- Produced by: Teddy Baird; Anatole de Grunwald
- Starring: Richard Greene; Cedric Hardwicke; Richard Burton; Beatrice Campbell
- Cinematography: Otto Heller
- Edited by: Gerald Turney-Smith
- Music by: Leighton Lucas; George Melachrino
- Production company: Warner Brothers-First National Productions
- Distributed by: Warner Brothers
- Release date: 24 May 1949
- Running time: 87 minutes
- Country: United Kingdom
- Language: English

Now Barabbas, also known as Now Barabbas Was a Robber, is a 1949 British drama film directed by Gordon Parry and starring Richard Greene, Cedric Hardwicke and Kathleen Harrison. It was written by Anatole de Grunwald based on the 1947 play Now Barabbas by William Douglas Home. The film features one of the earliest screen performances by Richard Burton and was an early role for Kenneth More.

The title refers to Barabbas, a Biblical character who was chosen over Jesus by the crowd in Jerusalem to be pardoned and released.

== Plot ==
Prison drama of individual convicts' lives from shoplifters to murderers told in short flashbacks, with a strong subtext for death penalty reform.

== Cast ==
- Richard Greene as Tufnell
- Cedric Hardwicke as Governor
- Kathleen Harrison as Mrs. Brown
- Ronald Howard as Roberts Bank Cashier
- Stephen Murray as chaplain
- William Hartnell as Warder Jackson
- Beatrice Campbell as Kitty
- Richard Burton as Paddy
- Betty Ann Davies as Rosie
- Leslie Dwyer as Brown
- Alec Clunes as Gale
- Percy Walsh as Jones
- Harry Fowler as Smith
- Kenneth More as Spencer
- Julian D'Albie as Medworth
- Glyn Lawson as Anderson
- Dora Bryan as Winnie
- Constance Smith as Jean
- Lily Kann as woman
- David Hannaford as 'Erb Brown
- Dandy Nichols as Mrs Smith
- John Longden as Customs Officer

== Production ==
The film was shot at Teddington Studios.

== Critical reception ==
The Monthly Film Bulletin wrote: "The characters are finely drawn with true insight into character. The portrayal of the prison chaplain is worth seeing as an example of how necessary tact is and how delicate the problem of religion in times of stress. The warders' flashes of kindness under gruff exteriors make good propaganda for prison officials. All parts are well played and the direction is more than excellent. There is no "sob-stuff", but there is plenty of pathos tinged with real fun. Kathleen Harrison and Leslie Dwyer provide the comic relief and their awful small boy is a gem. The photography is good and the story well knit together. It is essentially an interesting film whether from a social or entertainment point of view."

In British Sound Films: The Studio Years 1928–1959 David Quinlan rated the film as "very good", writing: "Characters clearly drawn, emotions skilfully played upon."

The Radio Times Guide to Films gave the film 3/5 stars, writing: " 'Elsie's Dad is inside again' reads the chalk message on a prison wall, one of several humorous touches in an otherwise sombre story of prison life. The assorted inmates include a bigamist, an embezzler, an Irish terrorist (strikingly portrayed by Richard Burton in his second screen role) and a well-mannered murderer about to be executed (a likeable performance by Richard Greene). Ably directed by Gordon Parry, this film version of William Douglas Home's play argues against the death penalty, but had the development of a homosexual relationship cut by the censor."
