= The Boardroom =

- Directed by: Brian Phillis
- Starring: Vincent Ball; Tony Wager
- Country of origin: Australia
- Original language: English

Production
- Producer: Pamela Borain
- Running time: 100 mins
- Production company: Falcon Films

Original release
- Network: ABC
- Release: 1988

The Boardroom is a 1988 Australian television film directed by Brian Phillis and starring Vincent Ball and Tony Wager.

== Cast ==
- Vincent Ball as Nonathan Hurt
- Tony Wager as James Cavill-Broan
- Colin McEwan as Donald Malone
