= Edgar Lustgarten =

British writer and broadcaster (1907–1978)

- Edgar Lustgarten hosting Scotland Yard (1953–1961)
- Born: 3 May 1907; Broughton Park, Salford, Lancashire, UK
- Died: 15 December 1978 (aged 71); Marylebone, London, UK
- Occupations: Novelist and journalist
- Spouse: Joyce Goldstone (m. 1932–1971) (her death)
- Writing career
- Pen name: Brent Wood
- Genres: Detective fiction, crime fiction, mystery fiction

Edgar Marcus Lustgarten (3 May 1907 – 15 December 1978) was a British broadcaster and noted crime writer.

== Biography ==
Born in the Broughton Park area of Salford, Lancashire, he was the son of Joseph and Sara (née Finklestein) Lustgarten. His father was a Romanian-Jewish barrister. Lustgarten was educated at Manchester Grammar School and St John's College, Oxford. He was President of the Oxford Union for the Hilary term of 1930. His years at the bar—he was a practising barrister, 1930–40—provided the background to his crime novels and his studies in true crime. In 1932 he married Joyce Goldstone in Manchester. She came from a family of jewellers. Joyce died in 1972. They had no children.

During the Second World War he was medically unfit for active service but worked in Radio Counter-Propaganda (1940–45), under the name of 'Brent Wood'. He was a BBC staff producer, 1945–48, and organiser of the BBC television programme In the News (1950–54) and of the ATV programme Free Speech (1955–61).

His books included crime fiction, but most of them were true crime narratives. The legal justice system and courtroom procedures were his main interests and his writings reflect this. He also wrote numerous articles for newspapers and presented the radio series Advocate Extraordinary. He used to say that he had no schedules, writing everywhere any time, in bars, in cars, and while walking in the streets.

== Legacy ==
Lustgarten died at the Marylebone Library while reading The Spectator.

He is remembered for hosting the series of British film shorts Scotland Yard (1953–61) and The Scales of Justice (1962–67), filmed at Merton Park Studios, London, SW19. Initially released as supporting films in UK cinemas, Scotland Yard was broadcast beginning on 17 November 1957, by the American Broadcasting Company in the United States. His novel Game for Three Losers was filmed as an episode of Merton Park's Edgar Wallace Mysteries.

In the decade following his death, Lustgarten briefly ascended into the realm of pop culture when his inimitable voice was heard in dance music. Samples of him reading from "Death on the Crumbles" were used in the Australian band Severed Heads' 1984 hit song "Dead Eyes Opened". His works are still used as introductory readings in several law schools in different countries because of their accuracy on the atmosphere of trials and attorneys' behaviour. He was mimicked as the Narrator in The Rocky Horror Picture Show.

In October 2012, his film work made its debut on DVD when Network released the complete series of The Scales of Justice as a two-disc set. Scotland Yard was released by Network DVD in 2014 as a seven-disc set.

== Publications ==
Crime novels

- A Case to Answer (One More Unfortunate) (1947)
- Blondie Iscariot (1948)
- Game for Three Losers (1952)
- I'll Never Leave You (1971)
- Turn the Light Out as You Go (1978)

True crime

- Verdict in Dispute (1949)
- Defender's Triumph (1951)
- The Woman in the Case (1955)
- The Murder and the Trial (1958)
- The Business of Murder (1968)
- The Chalk Pit Murder (1975)
- A Century of Murderers (1975)
- The Illustrated Story of Crime (1976)

== External sources ==
- Who Was Who, vol. 7, 1971–80, London : A. & C. Black, 1981.
