= Patricia Welles =

American writer (born 1934)

- Occupations: Writer, novelist
- Spouse(s): Philip Levine, Leon Friedman

Patricia Welles, informally Patti Welles, is an American novelist, occasional poet and playwright, and former actress, best known for her first novel, Babyhip (1967). She began life as Patricia L. Kanterman, and the name Welles was at first a stage and pen name, but by about 1968 she had adopted it for all purposes.

== Early life ==
Welles was born in Canton, Stark County, Ohio, one of the daughters of Nathan C. Kanterman and his wife Ruth Thal Lawner, daughter of Marks Lawner, of Dayton, Ohio. They were married there in 1921, in a Jewish wedding reported at length in the ‘Society’ column of The Dayton Herald. The young Welles was educated at schools in Detroit, Highland Park Community High School, and Radcliffe College. After that, she took a job in television production and studied acting in a Carnegie Hall group with Lee and Paula Strasberg. Her parents were later of Royal Oak, Michigan.

== Early career ==
The dust-cover of The Switch (1971) says that Welles had worked “in television, advertising, and movies, as a model, an actress, and a waitress”. While working on stage, Welles appeared in an off-Broadway revival of Sartre's No Exit. She said in 1967 that she gave up acting as she found it hard "to sell yourself for each new part." She went on to take writing jobs.

== Novelist ==
A writer, Welles had a huge success with her first novel, Babyhip, published by E. P. Dutton in September 1967, described by The New York Times as “observations of hippie-style extremists of the high school generation”. This brought her an “unexpected bonanza” even before publication, with Dutton agreeing an advance for the sale of 13,000 copies, and the New American Library paying $150,000 (equivalent to $1,448,353 in 2025) as an advance against royalties for the paperback rights. Palladian Productions contracted for the movie rights at $100,000 and had to pay $25,000 of that before publication of the book.

Further novels followed, including in 1969 a novelization of the screenplay of Bob & Carol & Ted & Alice by Paul Mazursky and Larry Tucker. Leo on the Ascendant (1969) was advertised as “A funny, sexy novel of London life by the author of Babyhip – the novel which seduced more people than it outraged”.

Between May and June 1972, Welles’s comedy “The Lottery” was performed for four weeks at the Hampstead Theatre Club, directed by Ronald Hayman, with Lisa Daniely and Philip Lowrie in the cast.

In 1987 her poem ‘Elephants are slow to mate’ was published in The Literary Review.

== Personal life ==
In 1951, Welles left her high school to marry the poet Philip Levine, but the marriage broke up in 1953. Later, she was “much married”. After a marriage to Leon Friedman which ended in 1966, she settled in London.

In 1952, Welles’s identical twin sister Barbara married Henry Murray LeBost (1929–2008), a recent graduate in pre-medicine who later became a physician. Her sister graduated A.B. in 1955 and A.M. in 1956 at the University of Michigan, divorced, and as Barbara LeBost became an instructor in English and foreign languages at the Teachers College of Columbia University and a lecturer in education at Queens College, Flushing. She was also a promising poet. In October 1966, Barbara LeBost suffered serious injuries in an automobile crash near the Queens College parking lot which instantly killed a colleague, Dr. Patrick Quinn, and died a few days later, aged 32. Her poetry was published posthumously, notably the collection Mind's Country and Other Poems (1968) in the Penguin Modern Poets series.

Time said of Welles in 1967 “Patricia Welles is the pen name of Marjorie Morningstar – well, not quite, but almost. It disguises Patricia Kanterman of Detroit, who, divorced and 33, seems far removed from the hippie scene.

In April 1968, in Westminster, England, as Patricia Welles, she married Timothy J. Langdale, an English barrister. He later became a Queen's Counsel.

The dust-cover of Welles’s novel Shooting Stars (May 1970) says she was then living in California, “gathering sea-shells and writing her next novel. It will be about marriage — a subject which Miss Welles has thoroughly researched”. That of The Switch (1971) says she was back in London and was married to a barrister with whom she had one daughter, born in Lambeth, London, in 1971.

In 1995, Welles became a director of the Stillbirth and Neonatal Death Society.

== Publications ==
- Babyhip (New York: E. P. Dutton, 1967)
- Bob and Carol and Ted and Alice (1969)
- Leo on the Ascendant (London: Michael Joseph, 1969 ISBN 978-0718106669)
- Shooting Stars: an Astrological Novel (New York: McCall, May 1970)
- The Switch (London: Michael Joseph, 1971)
- Angel in the Snow (1979)
- Members Only, a Novel (1981)
- The Ghost of S.W.1 (New York: E. P. Dutton, 1986, ISBN 978-0917657511), also published in paperback as Sara’s Ghost (1987)
- Comeuppance
- Look to This Day (2013)
