= Lisa Daniely =

British actress (1929–2014)

- Born: Mary Elizabeth Bodington; 4 June 1929; Reading, Berkshire, England
- Died: 24 January 2014 (aged 84)
- Occupation: Actress
- Years active: 1950–2007
- Spouse: Grey Blake (m. 1952–1971; his death)

Lisa Daniely (born Mary Elizabeth Bodington; 4 June 1929 – 24 January 2014) was a British film and television actress.

== Life and career ==
Born in Reading, Berkshire, to an English solicitor father and a French mother, she was educated in Paris and studied at the Sarah Bernhardt Theatre.

She made her film debut at the age of 21, in the title role of Lilli Marlene (1950), whilst in Hindle Wakes (1952) she played the part of mill worker Jenny Hawthorn. In Tiger by the Tail (1955) she played opposite Larry Parks, and later appeared in the horror film Curse of Simba (1965), but appeared more regularly on television. In the ITC series The Invisible Man (1958 TV series), loosely based on H. G. Wells' novel, she played Diane Brady.

Her other appearances in various TV programmes include The Saint, Danger Man, Doctor Who, Strange Report, The Protectors, The First Churchills (as Queen Mary II), Van der Valk and The Adventures of Sherlock Holmes.

In 1972, Daniely appeared in Patricia Welles's comedy "The Lottery" at the Hampstead Theatre, directed by Ronald Hayman.

She portrayed Queen Elizabeth II in the TV film Princess in Love (1996). In 2007, she provided background commentary to several episodes of The Invisible Man (1958 TV series) released by Network DVD.

== Personal life and death ==
Lisa Daniely was married to actor Grey Blake from 1952 until his death in 1971. Daniely died aged 84 on 24 January 2014, from undisclosed causes.

== Selected filmography ==
- Lili Marlene (1950) title role
- Hindle Wakes (1952)
- The Wedding of Lilli Marlene (1953)
- Operation Diplomat (1953)
- Tiger by the Tail (1955)
- The Man in the Road (1957)
- The Vicious Circle (1957)
- Danger Tomorrow (1960)
- Scotland Yard – "The Last Train" (1960)
- The Man Who Was Nobody (1960)
- Two Wives at One Wedding(1961)
- The Middle Course (1961)
- Curse of Simba (1965)
- Stranger in the House (1967)
- Sherlock Holmes - The Crooked Man (1984)
- Souvenir (1989)
- Goldeneye (1989) as Wren Captain
