= Leslie Dwyer =

English actor (1906–1986)

- in The Way Ahead (1944)
- Born: Leslie Gilbert Dyer; 28 August 1906; Catford, London, England
- Died: 26 December 1986 (aged 80); Truro, Cornwall, England
- Resting place: Tregony New Cemetery
- Occupation: Actor

Leslie Gilbert Dwyer (28 August 1906 – 26 December 1986) was an English film and television actor.

== Early life ==
He was born in Catford to a theatrical family: his father the popular music hall comedian Johnny Dwyer, his mother a straight actress and his great-uncle the Cosmopolitan actor J. B. Howe. Trained by his parents and at the Italia Conti Academy of Theatre Arts, Dwyer made his first appearance on stage in 1916 at the age of ten, singing a medley of World War I songs at the Palace Theatre, Euston. Three years later, he was cast as a wolf in Peter Pan at St James's Theatre, auditioned personally by the author J. M. Barrie. More stage work followed and in 1921, he started to appear in silent movies, which led to "talkies" and appearances on television.

== Career ==
He is perhaps best known to television audiences for his role as the Punch and Judy man Mr Partridge in BBC sitcom Hi-de-Hi!. Film roles included In Which We Serve (1942), The Way Ahead (1944), the 1952 remake of Hindle Wakes, Act of Love (1953) in which he played a two hander scene opposite the young Brigitte Bardot, Room in the House (1955), the 1959 remake of Hitchcock's The 39 Steps, and Die, Monster, Die! (1966).

He played Sergeant Dusty Miller in the original 1942 production of Terence Rattigan's play Flare Path, the first role to help bring him into notice.

He played Drinkwater in the 1953 television production of George Bernard Shaw's Captain Brassbound's Conversion. His most notable television role was as Mr. Partridge, the miserable, hard-drinking Punch and Judy man with an aversion to children, in the British sitcom Hi-de-Hi!. He took roles in Public Eye in 1969, Doctor Who (as Vorg in Carnival of Monsters in 1973) and in Steptoe and Son, Terry and June, Wodehouse Playhouse, Z-Cars and The Sweeney, in which he played "old sea dog" Ted Greenhead in the episode Trojan Bus.

== Death ==
Dwyer died on 26 December 1986, aged 80 (respiratory failure due to pulmonary embolism). His funeral took place at St Cuby's Church, Cuby on 2 January 1987 and his grave is located in Tregony New Cemetery.

== Selected filmography ==
- The 39 Steps (1935) - Milkman (uncredited)
- Cheer Up (1936) – Hotel Guest (uncredited)
- In Which We Serve (1942) – Parkinson
- The Goose Steps Out (1942) – German Soldier on Train (uncredited)
- Schweik's New Adventures (1943) – Prisoner
- Yellow Canary (1943) – Ship's Steward (uncredited)
- The Lamp Still Burns (1943) – Siddons
- The Way Ahead (1944) – Pte. Sid Beck
- Great Day (1945) – Pub Customer
- Perfect Strangers (1945) – Stripey
- Night Boat to Dublin (1946) – George Leggett
- I See a Dark Stranger (1946) – Soldier in Cafe (uncredited)
- This Man Is Mine (1946) – Van Driver (uncredited)
- Piccadilly Incident (1946) – Sam
- Temptation Harbour (1947) – Reg
- The Little Ballerina (1947) – Barman
- When the Bough Breaks (1947) – George
- The Calendar (1948) – Sam Hillcott
- Bond Street (1948) – Barman
- The Bad Lord Byron (1949) – Fletcher
- It's Not Cricket (1949) – Batman
- A Boy, a Girl and a Bike (1949) – Steve Hall
- Now Barabbas (1949) – Brown
- Poet's Pub (1949) – Holly
- Double Confession (1950) – Leonard
- Lilli Marlene (1950) – Berry
- Midnight Episode (1950) – Albert
- Smart Alec (1951) – Gossage
- Laughter in Paradise (1951) – Police Sergeant
- There Is Another Sun (1951) – Foley
- Judgment Deferred (1952) – Flowers
- The Hour of 13 (1952) – Ernie Perker
- My Wife's Lodger (1952) – Roger the Lodger
- Hindle Wakes (1952) – Chris Hawthorn
- Marilyn (1953) – George Saunders
- Act of Love (1953) – Le sergent anglais
- The Good Die Young (1954) – Stookey
- The Black Rider (1954) – Robert Plack
- Where There's a Will (1955) – Alfie Brewer
- Room in the House (1955) – Benji Pugh
- Not So Dusty (1956) – Nobby
- Cloak Without Dagger (1956) – Fred Borcombe
- Eyewitness (1956) – Henry Cammon
- Face in the Night (1957) – Toby
- Stormy Crossing (1958) – Bill Harris
- The 39 Steps (1959) – Milkman
- Left Right and Centre (1959) – Left – Alf Stoker
- I've Gotta Horse (1965) – Bert
- Die, Monster, Die! (1965) (UK title: Monster of Terror) – Potter
- The Bliss of Mrs. Blossom (1968) – Bookshop assistant
- Lionheart (1968) – Carpenter
- Crooks and Coronets (1969) – Henry
- Leave it to Charlie (1978) – Arnold Merryweather, Episode: "Love and Mrs. McGee"
- Dominique (1979) – Cemetery Supervisor
