= William Abney (disambiguation) =

William de Wiveleslie Abney (1843–1920) was an English chemist and photographer.

William Abney may also refer to:

- William Abney (actor) (1921–1997), English actor
- William Abney, High Sheriff of Leicestershire in 1792
- William Wooton Abney, High Sheriff of Leicestershire in 1847
