= Diana Wynyard =

English stage and film actress (1906–1964)

Diana Wynyard CBE
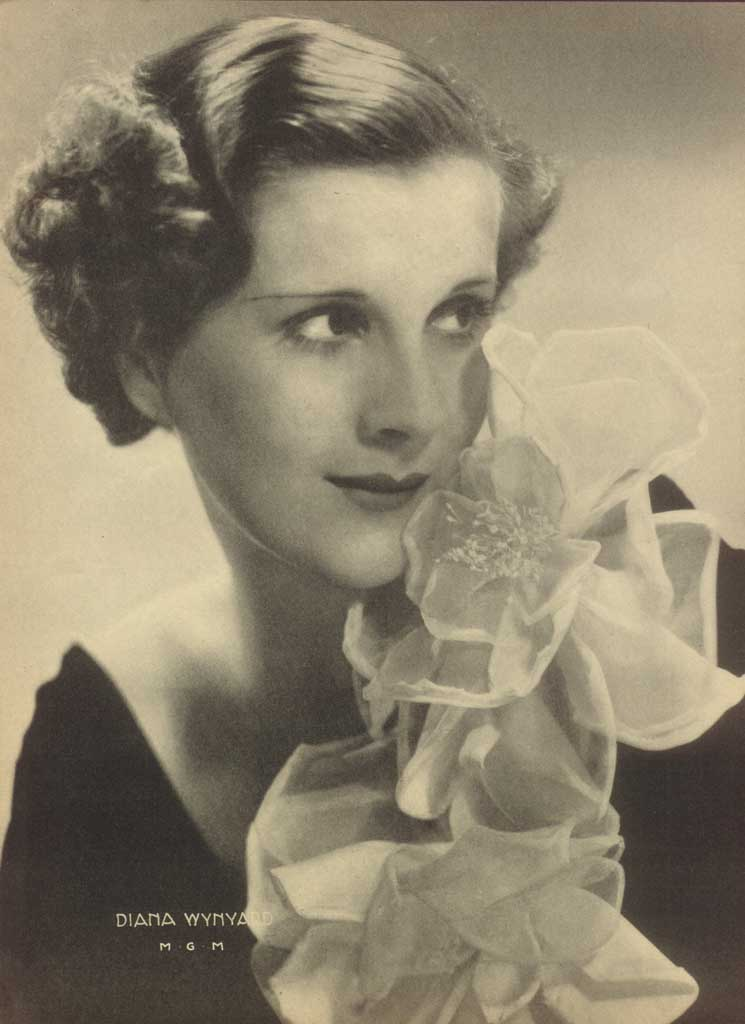
- Wynyard in 1933
- Born: Dorothy Isobel Cox; 16 January 1906; Lewisham, south London, England
- Died: 13 May 1964 (aged 58); Holborn, Central London, England
- Years active: 1928–1960
- Spouses: Carol Reed (m. 1943; div. 1947) Tibor Csato (m. 1951; div. 1958)

Diana Wynyard (born Dorothy Isobel Cox; 16 January 1906 – 13 May 1964) was an English stage and film actress.

== Life and career ==
Born in Lewisham, south London, Wynyard began her career on the stage. After performing in Liverpool and London with the Liverpool Repertory Company and the Hamilton Deane Repertory Company, she performed on Broadway, appearing first in Rasputin and the Empress in 1932, with Ethel, John, and Lionel Barrymore. She appeared in the film version, beginning her brief Hollywood career.

Fox Film Corporation then borrowed her for their lavish film version of Noël Coward's stage spectacle Cavalcade (1933). As the noble wife and mother she aged gracefully against a background of the Boer War, the sinking of the Titanic, the First World War, and the arrival of the Jazz Age. With this performance, she became the first British actress to be nominated for the Academy Award for Best Actress. After a handful of film roles, including playing John Barrymore's old flame in Reunion in Vienna, she returned to Britain, but concentrated on theatre work, including roles as Charlotte Brontë in Clemence Dane's Wild Decembers, in Sweet Aloes, and as Gilda in the British premiere of Noël Coward's Design for Living.

She was tempted to return to the screen to play opposite Ralph Richardson in On the Night of the Fire (1939), a film directed by Brian Desmond Hurst. Her best remembered success was as the frightened heroine of Gaslight (1940), the first film version of Patrick Hamilton's play Gas Light. This was followed by roles opposite Clive Brook in Freedom Radio, John Gielgud in The Prime Minister and Michael Redgrave in Kipps (all 1941), directed by Carol Reed, later her first husband.

== After World War II ==
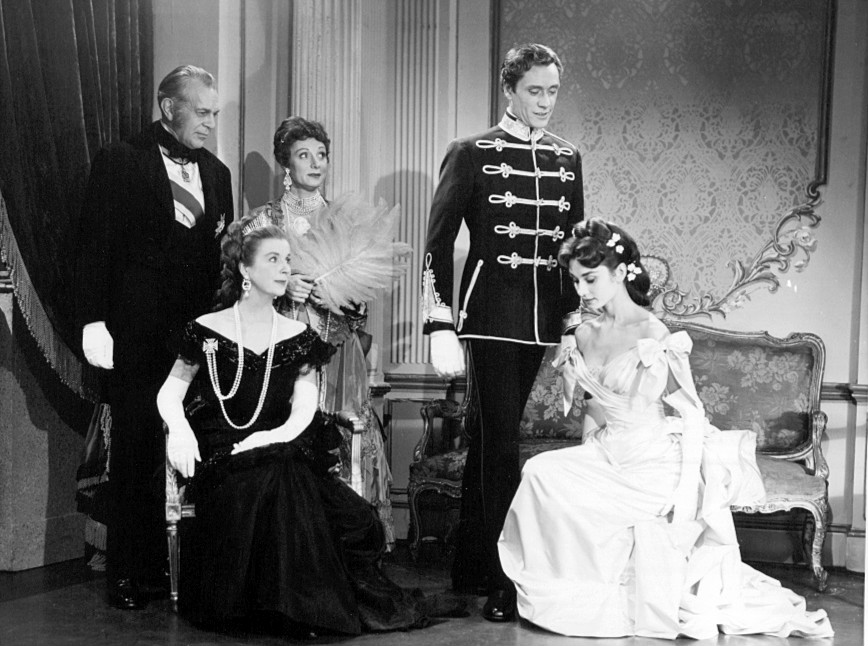
Raymond Massey, Diana Wynyard (seated), Judith Evelyn, Mel Ferrer and Audrey Hepburn in Mayerling (1957 TV production)

Her stage career flourished after the war, and as a Shakespearean leading lady at Stratford, in London's West End and on tour in Australia, she had her pick of star parts. Between 1948 and 1952, she played Portia, Gertrude, Lady Macbeth, Katherine the shrew, Desdemona, Katherine of Aragon, Hermione in The Winter's Tale, and Beatrice to Gielgud's Benedick in Much Ado About Nothing. In this production, she succeeded her friend Peggy Ashcroft. Wynyard stumbled off the rostrum during the sleepwalking scene in Macbeth in 1948. She fell 15 feet, but was able to continue. Throughout the 1940s and 1950s she also had success in the works of several contemporary writers, including the British production of Tennessee Williams's Camino Real.

She appeared in Alexander Korda's version of An Ideal Husband (1947), based on the Oscar Wilde play, but her remaining film appearances were in supporting roles. Usually maternal, these included Tom Brown's Schooldays (1951) and the secretive mother (of James Mason's character) in Island in the Sun (1957). She played Empress Elisabeth of Austria in Mayerling (1957), an early American television film which starred Audrey Hepburn. In 1958 she appeared in the West End in A Touch of the Sun by N.C. Hunter.

She was appointed Commander of the Order of the British Empire (CBE) in 1953.

== Personal life ==
She was married to the English film director Carol Reed from 3 February 1943 until August 1947, and subsequently to a Hungarian physician, Tibor Csato.

She died from renal disease in Holborn, Central London in 1964, aged 58, while rehearsing The Master Builder with Michael Redgrave and Maggie Smith as part of the new National Theatre Company. Celia Johnson replaced her.

Her last television performance was in the play The Man in the Panama Hat recorded in March 1964. Her death occurred before the intended broadcast in May 1964 and it was eventually shown posthumously on 21 September 1964.

== Filmography ==
- Rasputin and the Empress (1932)
- Cavalcade (1933)
- Men Must Fight (1933)
- Reunion in Vienna (1933)
- Where Sinners Meet (1934)
- Let's Try Again (UK title: The Marriage Symphony) (1934)
- One More River (1934)
- On the Night of the Fire (1939)
- Gaslight (1940)
- Freedom Radio (1941)
- The Prime Minister (1941)
- Kipps (1941)
- An Ideal Husband (1947)
- Tom Brown's Schooldays (1951)
- The Feminine Touch (1956)
- Island in the Sun (1957)

== Selected stage credits ==
- Sorry You've Been Troubled by Walter Hackett (1929)
- Lean Harvest by Ronald Jeans (1931)
- Pygmalion by George Bernard Shaw (1937)
- Watch on the Rhine by Lillian Hellman (1942)
- The Wind of Heaven by Emlyn Williams (1945)
- Camino Real by Tennessee Williams (1957)
- A Touch of the Sun by N.C. Hunter (1958)
