= Leon Friedman =

Leon Friedman may refer to:

- Leon Friedman (politician) (1886–1948), American politician
- Leon Friedman (legal scholar) (born 1933), American legal scholar
