= Arthur Hambling =

British actor (1888–1952)

- Born: 14 March 1888; Reading, Berkshire, England
- Died: 6 December 1952 (aged 64); Surrey, England
- Occupation: Actor
- Years active: 1912–1952

Arthur Hambling (14 March 1888 – 6 December 1952) was a British actor, on stage from 1912, and best known for appearances in the films Henry V (1944) and The Lavender Hill Mob (1951). In 1939 he appeared in the West End in N.C. Hunter's comedy Grouse in June.

== Selected filmography ==
- The W Plan (1930) - Minor Role (uncredited)
- Greek Street (1930) - Alfie
- Other People's Sins (1931) - Fireman
- Sally in Our Alley (1931) - Minor Role (uncredited)
- A Night in Montmartre (1931) - Inspector Brichot
- Detective Lloyd (1932) - Minor Role (uncredited)
- Something Always Happens (1934) - First Duped Waiter (uncredited)
- Death at Broadcasting House (1934) - Man On BBC Reception Desk (uncredited)
- The Scoop (1934) - Inspector Stephenson
- Lorna Doone (1934) - Soldier
- The Scarlet Pimpernel (1934) - Captain of the Guard (uncredited)
- Look Up and Laugh (1935) - Sam (uncredited)
- Midshipman Easy (1935) - First Lieutenant Sawbett
- Whom the Gods Love (1936) - Minor Role (uncredited)
- The House of the Spaniard (1936) - Albert Smith (uncredited)
- French Leave (1937) - Cpl. Sykes
- The Girl in the Taxi (1937) - Senior Police Officer (uncredited)
- The Last Chance (1937) - Constable Brown
- A Romance in Flanders (1937) - Colonel Kennedy
- South Riding (1938) - Village Doctor (uncredited)
- I See Ice (1938) - Prison Warder (uncredited)
- Almost a Honeymoon (1938) - Adolphus
- Kate Plus Ten (1938) - 3rd Signalman (uncredited)
- The Gaunt Stranger (1938) - Detective Sgt. Richards
- Many Tanks Mr. Atkins (1938) - Sgt. Maj. Cyril Hornett
- Lightning Conductor (1938) - Bus Inspector
- The Four Just Men (1939) - Benham
- At the Villa Rose (1940) - Mons. Perrichet
- Three Silent Men (1940) - Ginger Brown
- Bulldog Sees It Through (1940) - Inspector Horn
- Old Bill and Son (1941) - Shelter Delivery Man (uncredited)
- Inspector Hornleigh Goes To It (1941) - Joe (uncredited)
- 'Pimpernel' Smith (1941) - Jordan
- Cottage to Let (1941) - Scotland Yard Inspector (uncredited)
- The Saint Meets the Tiger (1941) - Police constable
- The Common Touch (1941) - Pettit (uncredited)
- The Black Sheep of Whitehall (1942) - Bailiff (uncredited)
- Penn of Pennsylvania (1942) - (uncredited)
- The Missing Million (1942) - Wells
- Hard Steel (1942) - Mr. Lamport
- They Flew Alone (1942) - Policeman
- Gert and Daisy Clean Up (1942) - PC Albert Green (uncredited)
- Happidrome (1943) - Jones Jnr.
- Variety Jubilee (1943) - Commissionaire
- Up with the Lark (1943) - Policeman in Ethel and Gracie's Cell
- Time Flies (1943) - Captain Of The Guard (uncredited)
- Demobbed (1944) - Curtis
- It Happened One Sunday (1944) - Immigration Officer
- Don't Take It to Heart (1944) - Railway Porter
- Henry V (1944) - Bates - Soldier in the English Army
- He Snoops to Conquer (1945) - Policeman (uncredited)
- Johnny Frenchman (1945) - Steve Matthews
- Odd Man Out (1947) - Tom
- It Always Rains on Sunday (1947) - Yardmaster
- Daughter of Darkness (1948) - Jacob
- Good-Time Girl (1948) - Policeman At Park Gates
- My Brother's Keeper (1948) - Hodges
- Portrait from Life (1949) - Coroner's Officer (uncredited)
- Vote for Huggett (1949) - Newspaperman (uncredited)
- It's Not Cricket (1949) - Barman
- Don't Ever Leave Me (1949) - Policeman (Jack's Flat)
- Trottie True (1949) - Mr. Jupp (uncredited)
- Train of Events (1949) - (uncredited)
- Waterfront (1950) - Police Sergeant (uncredited)
- Cage of Gold (1950) - Jenkins
- The Clouded Yellow (1950) - Local Police Sgt (uncredited)
- Blackmailed (1951) - Inspector Canin
- The Lavender Hill Mob (1951) - Wallis
- The Happy Family (1952) - Granger
- Derby Day (1952) - Col. Tremaine (uncredited)
- Time Bomb (1953) - Train Driver (final film role)

== Selected stage credits ==
- A Sleeping Clergyman by James Bridie (1933)
- The Last Straw by Reginald Denham (1937)
- Grouse in June by N.C. Hunter (1939)
- The Wind of Heaven by Emlyn Williams (1945)
- Let Tyrants Tremble! by Bernard Miles (1946)
