= Hugh McDermott (actor) =

British golfer and actor (1906–1972)

- Born: 20 March 1906; Edinburgh, Midlothian, Scotland, United Kingdom
- Died: 29 January 1972 (aged 65); London, England, United Kingdom
- Years active: 1936–1972
- Spouse(s): Daphne Courtney (m. 1936; div. 1950) Angela Laurillard (m. 1950)

Hugh Patrick McDermott (20 March 1906 – 29 January 1972) was a Scottish professional golfer turned actor, who made a number of film, stage, and television performances between 1936 and 1972. He specialised in playing Americans, so much so that most British film fans had no idea that he was actually Scottish.

== Biography ==
He was born in Edinburgh, Scotland, in 1906, and was educated in Davidson's Mains. Initially an instructor at the Royal Burgess Golfing Society of Edinburgh, he later toured South and Central America and won the Central America Open and later helped design a course in Guatemala.

A trip to the United States kindled his interest in the film industry, and he made his screen debut in Well Done, Henry and followed it up with an appearance as HM Stanley in David Livingstone. In 1939, he appeared in the West End in N.C. Hunter's comedy Grouse in June. He made his final appearance in Chato's Land on film, and in The Amorous Prawn on stage in Edinburgh.

== Filmography ==
- Well Done, Henry (1936) - Sevier
- The Captain's Table (1936) - Inspector Mooney
- David Livingstone (1936) - H.M. Stanley
- The Wife of General Ling (1937) - Tracy
- The Divorce of Lady X (1938) - Minor Role (uncredited)
- His Lordship Goes to Press (1938) - Reporter (uncredited)
- Hey! Hey! USA (1938) - Man on Phone (uncredited)
- The Saint in London (1939) - Tim - Kussella's Chauffeur (uncredited)
- Where's That Fire? (1940) - Jim Baker
- For Freedom (1940) - Sam
- Neutral Port (1940) - Jim Grey
- Spring Meeting (1941) - Michael Byrne
- "Pimpernel" Smith (1941) - David Maxwell
- The Young Mr. Pitt (1942) - Mr. Melvill
- The Seventh Veil (1945) - Peter Gay
- This Man Is Mine (1946) - Bill Mackenzie
- No Orchids for Miss Blandish (1948) - Dave Fenner
- Good-Time Girl (1948) - Al Schwartz
- The Huggetts Abroad (1949) - Bob McCoy
- Lilli Marlene (1950) - Steve
- Two on the Tiles (1951) - Dick Lawson
- Four Days (1951) - Francis Templar
- Trent's Last Case (1952) - Calvin C. Bunner
- The Wedding of Lilli Marlene (1953) - Steve Moray
- The Love Lottery (1954) - Rodney Wheeler
- Night People (1954) - Maj. Burns
- Johnny on the Spot (1954) - Johnny Breakes
- Devil Girl from Mars (1954) - Michael Carter
- Malaga (1954) - Richard Farrell
- As Long as They're Happy (1955) - Barnaby Brady
- Thunder Rock (1955, TV film) - Streeter
- You Pay Your Money (1957) - Bob Westlake
- A King in New York (1957) - Bill Johnson (uncredited)
- The Man Who Wouldn't Talk (1958) - Bernie
- Delayed Flight (1964) - Lt. Col. Gavin Brampton
- First Men in the Moon (1964) - Richard Challis
- Bindle (One of Them Days) (1966) - American tourist
- Man in a Suitcase (1968) - Soames
- The File of the Golden Goose

(1969) - Ray Moss

- Guns in the Heather (1969) - Carleton
- The Adding Machine (1969) - Harry
- The Games (1970)
- Lawman (1971) - L.G. Moss
- Captain Apache (1971) - Gen. Ryland
- Jason King (TV series) (episode "Flamingoes Only Fly on Tuesdays", 1971) – Police Chief
- Chato's Land (1972) - Bartender (final film role)
