= The Headless Ghost =

- US film poster
- Directed by: Peter Graham Scott
- Written by: Aben Kandel (as Kenneth Langtry)
- Based on: original story by Langtry and Cohen
- Produced by: Herman Cohen executive James H. Nicholson; Samuel Z. Arkoff
- Starring: Richard Lyon; Liliane Sottane; David Rose
- Cinematography: John Wiles
- Music by: Gerard Schurmann
- Production company: Merton Park Studios
- Distributed by: Anglo Amalgamated Film Distributors
- Release date: April 1959; (US)
- Running time: 63 minutes
- Country: United Kingdom
- Language: English

The Headless Ghost is a 1959 British comedy horror film, produced by Herman Cohen and directed by Peter Graham Scott. It stars Richard Lyon, Liliane Sottane, David Rose, and Clive Revill. It was written by Aben Kandel (as Kenneth Langtry). The film tells of three young people who spend the night in a haunted English castle. With the help of a friendly ghost, they reunite the head of the Headless Ghost with its body, thus ending its 600 years of wandering about headless.

The film was made specifically as the second feature for an American double bill with Horrors of the Black Museum (1959). It was released in the US on April 22, 1959 on a double bill with Horrors of the Black Museum. It was later released in the UK in June, 1959.

== Plot ==
Three university students – Ingrid from Denmark and Americans Bill and Ronnie – take a tour of Ambrose Castle in England. After learning that the castle is haunted, they decide to secretly spend the night inside in the hopes of seeing a ghost. During the night, the ghost of the 4th Earl of Ambrose appears and tells them that he and the other ghosts are being bothered by Malcolm, who was beheaded 600 years earlier and condemned to wander about the castle until his body and head are re-joined.

The ghostly 4th Earl asks Ingrid, Bill and Ronnie for their help. He says the task of reuniting Malcolm's head and body can only be accomplished by finding a secret chamber, which contains a pouch filled with ashes, and throwing the ashes against Malcolm's portrait while reciting an incantation. Ingrid memorises the incantation when the 4th Earl says that he will tell it to them only once: The wing of a bird whose song was never heard/The snout of a toad that perished in our road/The scales of a fish all burned in a dish/Gathered in a pouch of leather/Hurled in stormy weather/To set him free/To set him free.

The three students go in search of the secret chamber, but once they hear the ghostly screams of Lady Wingfield being murdered by her husband Charles, who returned from the Crusades to discover that she had borne a child by another man, they change their minds. Ingrid tells the 4th Earl that they are facing 'impossible hurdles' and must leave. But then the voice of Malcolm booms out, declaring that he is holding them prisoner until they find his head, without which he cannot rest in peace.

As they search for the chamber, they come across a room of ghosts enjoying a banquet. A ghostly 'heathen' dancing girl-slave performs, but before she can be ordered to 'see to' Bill and Ronnie, Ingrid demands that they leave the banquet. They do, quickly finding the secret chamber and the pouch.

Meanwhile, Parker, the manservant of the current, living 16th Earl of Ambrose, informs him that something strange is going on inside the castle. The 16th Earl telephones the police. Sgt Grayson and his Constable quickly arrive and they, the 16th Earl and Parker enter the castle to investigate. They discover Ingrid, Bill and Ronnie and, of course, don't believe their story. The police threaten them with arrest.

As the officers chase Ingrid, Bill and Ronnie through the castle, Ingrid breaks away, recites the incantation and tosses the ashes on Malcolm's portrait. To everyone's amazement, the headless ghost of Malcolm then walks downstairs as his head floats in through a doorway. Malcolm catches his head and sticks it on, smiling in satisfaction when it is firmly attached. The 16th Earl says that he doesn't intend to press charges against Ingrid, Bill and Ronnie, but Grayson insists that everyone accompany him to the police station so that they can explain to the Inspector exactly what has happened. They all walk out into the foggy English night, smiling and chatting amiably.

== Cast ==
- Richard Lyon as Bill
- Liliane Sottane as Ingrid
- David Rose as Ronnie
- Clive Revill as the Fourth Earl
- Jack Allen as The Earl of Ambrose
- Alexander Archdale as Randolph
- Carl Bernard as Sgt Grayson
- Josephine Blake as dancer
- John Stacy as Parker
- Don Bisset as guide

Uncredited

- Mary Barclay as Lady Ambrose
- Trevor Barnett as strongman
- Patrick Connor as constable
- Nora Hammond (unnamed character)
- "Smokey" as the cat which frightened Ingrid.

Note: No credit could be found for the actor who played Malcolm, the Headless Ghost

== Production ==
Producer Herman Cohen was making Horrors of the Black Museum in England for Anglo-Amalgamated Films, with the film slated to be distributed in the US by American International Pictures (AIP). James H. Nicholson, one of the founders of AIP, asked Cohen 'to supply a suitable supporting feature in black-and-white 'Scope' to accompany Black Museum' because a 'large Texas circuit would book the double bill and others would follow suit. Consequently, a comedy thriller, The Headless Ghost, was written in two weeks and filmed in a further three for £35,000 between early December 1958 and mid-January 1959. The film was filmed in Dyaliscope, a French widescreen process with a 2.35:1 aspect ratio.

The film was shot on the same sets as Horror of the Black Museum with some additional location work at an actual castle. This may not have been the original intent, however. 'According to The Hollywood Reporter production charts and Daily Variety news items, the film was to be shot entirely on location in London, although an October 1958 Los Angeles Examiner item added that the film was to be shot at Burntisland Castle in the Firth of Foth, Scotland'.

Cohen later said in an interview that 'We knocked out that picture very, very fast; that's why the running time is so short, like sixty-five minutes ... In fact, we started Headless Ghost as I was still finishing Black Museum, editing and cutting it. But I honestly don't recall too much else about this picture, it was so bad.' Cohen later admitted that the film was unfunny and that he 'never liked' it.

The film was the final feature film of Richard Lyon who had co-starred in the Life with the Lyons television series and of Liliane Sottane.

The film was mostly shot at the Merton Park Studios.

== Release ==
The film was released in the US on April 22, 1959 on a double bill with Horrors of the Black Museum It opened in the UK in June 1959. The film was given a U-certificate by the British Board of Film Censors, allowing its exhibition in the UK to people of all ages. However, 'To obtain this category cuts were required but the details are not available'.

Anglo-Amalgamated Film Distributors were responsible for the 1959 UK theatrical release, while in the US, AIP distributed the film to theatres.

== Home media ==
The Headless Ghost was released for personal home viewing on DVD by VCI Home Entertainment in 1996 in the US, by Image Entertainment in the US at an unspecified date, and by VCI Entertainment in 2010, again on DVD and again in the US.

== Reception ==
The Monthly Film Bulletin wrote: "Apart from one or two entertaining touches, provided mainly by Clive Revill's Fourth Earl, this modest comedy suffers from unsubtle handling and a badly written script. All the spectres are opaque, but other supernatural effects are quite well contrived and it is doubtful whether the film is suitable for very young children."

As the second feature on a horror double bill, The Headless Ghost apparently had few American reviews at the time of its release. Writing in The New York Times on 30 April 1959, film critic Richard W. Nason devoted one paragraph to it in a review of both Horrors of the Black Museum and The Headless Ghost. He called The Headless Ghost "a pale and protracted bit of whimsy".

British film critic Phil Hardy described the film as "an undemanding ghost comedy", but similar in content to other ghost comedies, in particular the Italian film Fantasmi a Roma (1960) and West German film Das Spukschloss im Spessart (1960). Hardy noted that "Scott's movie has the merit of preceding them both".

Academic film historians Steve Chibnall and Brian McFarlane gave the film a rather negative review, writing that "Peter Graham Scott can make nothing of the inanities of The Headless Ghost ... Like Scott's other films, this one moves along quite smartly, but this time there is virtually nothing worth moving. Clive Revill provides a touch of campy style as the ghost of the fourth Earl who steps down from his portrait, the special effects are simple but adequate, but the overall impression is one of meagre inventiveness..." They call the three student characters "unlikable" and compare them unfavourably to another trio of young people at the centre of a film: James Dean, Natalie Wood and Sal Mineo in Rebel Without a Cause (1955).

== Other media ==
In June 1959, American International Records released a 45 rpm single by The Nightmares. The A-side song was titled '(Oooh I'm Scared Of The) Horrors of the Black Museum' and the B-side song was 'The Headless Ghost'. Each song ran a few seconds short of two minutes. Billboard magazine in its issue of 6 July 1959 wrote that 'The Headless Ghost' record 'has good sales potential ... for kids who enjoy horror films' and rated the song at three stars out of four.
