= Philip Levine (poet) =

American poet (1928–2015)

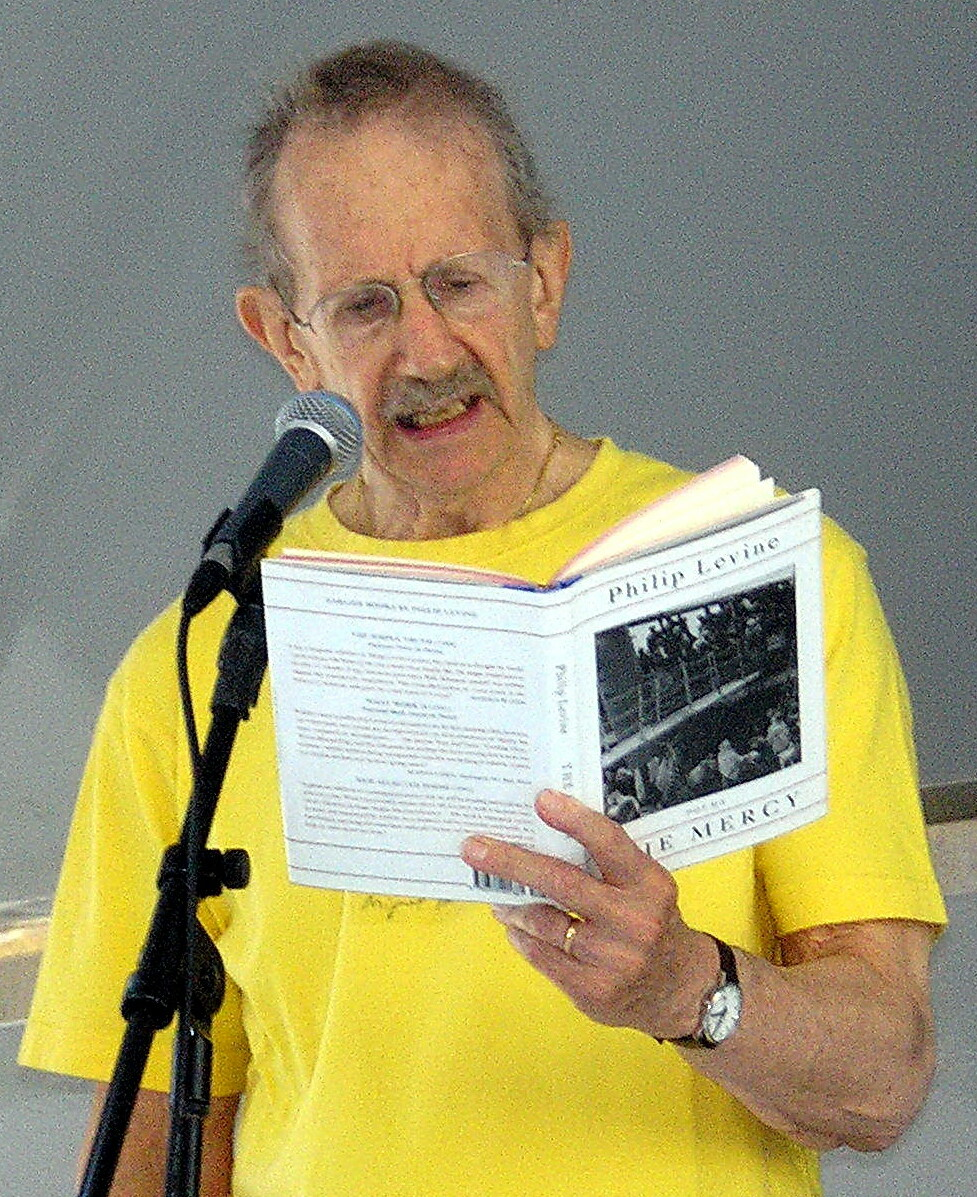
- Levine reading in 2006
- Born: January 10, 1928; Detroit, Michigan, US
- Died: February 14, 2015 (aged 87); Fresno, California, US
- Education: Wayne State University (BA); University of Iowa (MFA)
- Occupation: Poet
- Spouse(s): Patty Kanterman (1951–1953), Frances J. Artley (1954–2015)
- Children: 3
- Writing career
- Years active: 1963–2015
- Notable awards: Pulitzer Prize; National Book Award; National Book Critics Circle Award

United States Poet Laureate
- In office 2011–2012
- Preceded by: W. S. Merwin
- Succeeded by: Natasha Trethewey

Philip Levine (January 10, 1928 – February 14, 2015) was an American poet best known for his poems about working-class Detroit. He taught for more than thirty years in the English department of California State University, Fresno and held teaching positions at other universities as well. He served on the Board of Chancellors of the Academy of American Poets from 2000 to 2006, and was appointed Poet Laureate of the United States for 2011–2012.

== Biography ==
Philip Levine grew up in industrial Detroit, the second of three sons and the first of identical twins of Jewish immigrant parents. His father, Harry Levine, owned a used auto parts business, his mother, Esther Priscol (Pryszkulnik) Levine, was a bookseller. When Levine was five years old, his father died. While growing up, he faced the anti-Semitism embodied by Father Coughlin, the pro-Nazi radio priest. In high school, a teacher told him, "You write like an angel. Why don't you think about becoming a writer?" At this point, he was already working at night in auto factories, though he was just 14 years old. Detroit Central High School graduated him in 1946, and he went to college at Wayne University (now Wayne State University) in Detroit, where he began to write poetry, encouraged by his mother, to whom he dedicated the book of poems The Mercy. Levine earned his A.B. in 1950 and went to work for Chevrolet and Cadillac in what he called "stupid jobs." The work, he later wrote, was “so heavy and monotonous that after an hour or two I was sure each night that I would never last the shift.”

He married his first wife, Patty Kanterman, in 1951. The marriage lasted until 1953.

In 1953, he attended the University of Iowa without registering, studying with, among others, poets Robert Lowell and John Berryman, the latter of whom Levine called his "one great mentor."

In 1954, he earned a mail-order master's degree with a thesis on John Keats' "Ode to Indolence," and married actress Frances J. Artley.

He returned to the University of Iowa teaching technical writing and completed his Master of Fine Arts degree in 1957. The same year, he was awarded the Jones Fellowship in Poetry at Stanford University. In 1958, he joined the English department at California State University, Fresno, where he taught until his retirement in 1992. He also taught at many other universities, among them New York University as a Distinguished Writer-in-Residence, Columbia, Princeton, Brown, Tufts, Vanderbilt, and the University of California, Berkeley.

Levine and his wife had made their homes in Fresno and Brooklyn Heights. He died of pancreatic cancer on February 14, 2015, at age 87.

== Work ==
The familial, social, and economic world of twentieth-century Detroit is one of the major subjects of Levine's work. His portraits of working-class Americans and his continuous examination of his Jewish immigrant inheritance (both based on real life and described through fictional characters) has left a testimony of mid-twentieth century American life.

Levine's working experience lent his poetry a profound skepticism with regard to conventional American ideals. In his first two books, On the Edge (1963) and Not This Pig (1968), the poetry dwells on those who suddenly become aware that they are trapped in some murderous processes not of their own making. In 1968, Levine signed the “Writers and Editors War Tax Protest” pledge, vowing to refuse to make tax payments in protest against the Vietnam War.

In his first two books, Levine was somewhat traditional in form and relatively constrained in expression. Beginning with They Feed They Lion, typically Levine's poems are free-verse monologues tending toward trimeter or tetrameter. The music of Levine's poetry depends on the tension between his line-breaks and his syntax. The title poem of Levine's book 1933 (1974) is an example of the cascade of clauses and phrases one finds in his poetry. Other collections include The Names of the Lost, A Walk with Tom Jefferson, New Selected Poems, and the National Book Award-winning What Work Is.

On November 29, 2007, a tribute was held in New York City in anticipation of Levine's eightieth birthday. Among those celebrating Levine's career by reading Levine's work were Yusef Komunyakaa, Galway Kinnell, E. L. Doctorow, Charles Wright, Jean Valentine and Sharon Olds. Levine read several new poems as well.

Near the end of his life, Levine, an avid jazz aficionado, collaborated with jazz saxophonist and composer Benjamin Boone on the melding of his poetry and narration with music. The resulting CD, “The Poetry of Jazz” (Origin Records 82754), was released posthumously on March 16, 2018. It contains fourteen of Levine's poems and performances by Levine and Boone as well as jazz greats Chris Potter, Greg Osby, and Tom Harrell.

== Awards ==
- 1973 – American Academy of Arts and Letters Award, Frank O'Hara Prize, Guggenheim Foundation fellowship
- 1977 – Lenore Marshall Poetry Prize from the Academy of American Poets– The Names of the Lost (1975)
- 1978 – Harriet Monroe Memorial Prize from Poetry
- 1979 – National Book Critics Circle Award – Ashes: Poems New and Old – 7 Years from Somewhere
- 1980 – Guggenheim Foundation Fellowship
- 1980 – National Book Award for Poetry – Ashes: Poems New and Old
- 1981 – Levinson Prize from Poetry magazine
- 1987 – Ruth Lilly Poetry Prize from the Modern Poetry Association and the American Council for the Arts
- 1991 – National Book Award for Poetry and Los Angeles Times Book Prize – What Work Is
- 1995 – Pulitzer Prize for Poetry – The Simple Truth (1994)
- 2011 – Appointed Poet Laureate Consultant in Poetry to the Library of Congress (United States Poet Laureate)
- 2013 – Academy of American Poets Wallace Stevens Award

== Bibliography ==
=== Poetry ===
Collection

- On the Edge (1963), The Stone Wall Press. Limited to 220 numbered hardback copies.
- On the Edge (1964), The Second Press. First trade softcover edition.
- Not This Pig, Wesleyan University Press, 1968, ISBN 978-0-8195-2038-8; Wesleyan University Press, 1982, ISBN 978-0-8195-1038-9
- Pili's Wall, Unicorn Press, 1971; Unicorn Press, 1980
- Red Dust (1971)
- They Feed They Lion, Atheneum, 1972
- 1933, Atheneum, 1974, ISBN 978-0-689-10586-9
- On the Edge & Over: Poems, Old, Lost & New (1976), Cloud Marauder Press, ASIN: B0006D0JTI. Contains 16 of the 21 poems from Levine's 1963 debut volume, On the Edge, plus a second section made up of seven “lost” poems, and a third consisting of five new poems.
- The Names of the Lost, Atheneum, 1976
- Ashes: Poems New and Old, Atheneum, 1979, ISBN 978-0-689-10975-1
- 7 Years From Somewhere, Atheneum, 1979, ISBN 978-0-689-10974-4
- One for the Rose, Atheneum, 1981, ISBN 978-0-689-11223-2
- Selected Poems, Atheneum, 1984, ISBN 978-0-689-11456-4. Included by critic Harold Bloom in his list of works constituting the Western Canon.
- Sweet Will, Atheneum, 1985, ISBN 978-0-689-11585-1
- A Walk With Tom Jefferson, A.A. Knopf, 1988, ISBN 978-0-394-57038-9
- New Selected Poems, Knopf, 1991, ISBN 978-0-679-40165-0
- What Work Is, Knopf, 1992, ISBN 978-0-679-74058-2
- The Simple Truth, Alfred A. Knopf, 1994, ISBN 978-0-679-43580-8; Alfred A. Knopf, 1996, ISBN 978-0-679-76584-4
- Unselected Poems, Greenhouse Review Press, 1997, ISBN 978-0-9655239-0-5
- The Mercy, Random House, Inc., 1999, ISBN 978-0-375-70135-1
- Breath Knopf, 2004, ISBN 978-1-4000-4291-3; reprint, Random House, Inc., 2006, ISBN 978-0-375-71078-0
- Stranger to Nothing: Selected Poems, Bloodaxe Books, UK, 2006, ISBN 978-1-85224-737-9
- News of the World, Random House, Inc., 2009, ISBN 978-0-307-27223-2
- The Last Shift (2016), Edward Hirsch (Ed.), Knopf, ISBN 978-0451493262. (Note: Published posthumously.)

Translations

- Off the Map: Selected Poems of Gloria Fuertes, edited and translated with Ada Long (1984)
- Tarumba: The Selected Poems of Jaime Sabines, edited and translated with Ernesto Trejo (1979)

=== Essays ===
- The Bread of Time (1994)
- So Ask: Essays, Conversations, and Interviews (2002), University of Michigan Press
- My Lost Poets: A Life in Poetry (2016), Knopf, ISBN 978-0451493279.

=== Interviews ===
- Don't Ask, University of Michigan Press, 1981, ISBN 978-0-472-06327-7

———————

== Discography ==
=== Albums ===
- The Poetry of Jazz, Origin Records, 2018, UPC 805558275425
- The Poetry of Jazz Volume Two, Origin Records, 2019, UPC 805558277221

=== Recorded interviews ===
- "Interlochen Center for the Arts", Interview with Interlochen Arts Academy students on March 17, 1977.
- Moyers & Company, on December 29, 2013, Philip Levine reads some of his poetry and explores how his years working on Detroit's assembly lines inspired his poetry.
