= The Man Who Was Nobody =

1960 British film by Montgomery Tully

- Theatrical release poster
- Directed by: Montgomery Tully
- Screenplay by: James Eastwood
- Based on: The Man Who Was Nobody by Edgar Wallace
- Produced by: Jack Greenwood
- Starring: Hazel Court; John Crawford; Lisa Daniely
- Cinematography: Brian Rhodes
- Edited by: Bernard Gribble
- Music by: Francis Chagrin
- Production company: Merton Park Studios
- Distributed by: Anglo-Amalgamated
- Release date: 26 December 1960
- Running time: 58 minutes
- Country: United Kingdom
- Language: English

The Man Who Was Nobody is a 1960 British second feature film directed by Montgomery Tully and starring Hazel Court, John Crawford and Lisa Daniely. The screenplay was by James Eastwood, based on the 1927 Edgar Wallace novel of the same name. It is part of the series of Edgar Wallace Mysteries films made at Merton Park Studios from 1960 to 1965.

== Plot ==
Man-about-town James Tynewood pays for an expensive diamond. His cheque bounces and he disappears. His solicitor employs private eye Marjorie Stedman to find him. When Tynewood is found dead on the River Thames shore, the mysterious "South Africa Smith" appears and offers to help Stedman find the killer.

== Cast ==
- Hazel Court as Marjorie Stedman
- John Crawford as South Africa Smith
- Lisa Daniely as Alma Weston
- William Abney as James Tynewood
- Paul Eddington as Franz Reuter
- Robert Dorning as Vance
- Kevin Stoney as Joe
- Jack Watson as police Inspector
- Vanda Godsell as Mrs. Ferber
- Richard Bennett as Bobby
- Cecil Brock as salesman
- Deirdre Day as model agency secretary
- Arnold Diamond as Eddie
- André Mikhelson as croupier

== Critical reception ==
The Monthly Film Bulletin wrote: "Freely, and foggily, adapted version of an Edgar Wallace novel, featuring a private "eye" heroine in Hazel Court who waves her good breeding about like an enormous flag. The director's idea of high-life and low-life in Chelsea suggests that he has himself led a very sheltered existence."
