= Dr Benjamin Twist =

Fictional character

Dr. Benjamin Twist is a recurring fictional character who appears in several films featuring comedian Will Hay, who portrays the character in all mediums.

== Character history ==
Dr. Benjamin Twist is a bumbling, fraudulent but lovable science teacher of the fictional St. Michael's School, which forms the backdrop of the films he appears in. Twist's typical appearance was with a mortarboard at an angle on his head and a pince-nez on his nose, as he squinted in a bewildered way at his unruly pupils.

== Appearances ==
=== Good Morning, Boys ===
Twist's first appearance was in the 1937 film Good Morning, Boys, in which he is presented as the laid-back headmaster of St. Michael's, a boys' school for the sons of rich gentry, where he also teaches Science.

Initially, he turns a blind eye to the misbehaviour of the boys under his eye and teaches the children using his method of Twisterism, which is somehow related to Astrology and the signs of the Zodiac. However, he is later ordered by the school's new governor to adopt stricter policies, eventually turning St. Michael's into a military academy, with Twist holding an officer's rank.

=== Hey! Hey! USA! ===
Benjamin Twist appeared again in Hay's next film, Hey! Hey! USA! (1938). In this film, however, Twist is working as a porter aboard an oceangoing liner travelling between England and the United States, and during one particular voyage, he is mistaken for a scientist known as Prof. Tavistock by American gangster Bugs Leary (Edgar Kennedy), eventually becoming embroiled in a gangster plot to blackmail an American millionaire.

It is possible that Hey! Hey! USA! portrayed events that took place before Good Morning, Boys, explaining Twist's sudden change from teacher to steward and the absence of St. Michael's School.

=== Convict 99 ===
Benjamin Twist's final appearance in the Will Hay films was in the 1938 film Convict 99, which was released shortly after Hey! Hey! USA!. In this film, Twist is dismissed from St. Michaels for incompetence, and whilst attending a job interview for a position in another school, he is mistaken for Australian disciplinarian John D. Benjamin (Roy Emerton), and accidentally accepts the post of governor of Blackdown Prison in Devon (possibly based on the real-life Dartmoor Prison), where he befriends prison-warden Albert (Graham Moffatt) and inmate Jerry "The Mole" (Moore Marriott).

== Other appearances ==
A precursor of the Benjamin Twist character was Dr. Alec Smart in Boys Will Be Boys (1935), who was an otherwise identical teaching character.

In The Ghost of St. Michael's (1941), the bumbling-teacher character has changed to William Lamb, but the character still bears similarities in appearance and manner to Benjamin Twist.
