= Middle Course =

The Middle Course
- Original British quad poster
- Directed by: Montgomery Tully
- Written by: Brian Clemens
- Produced by: Edward J. Danziger; Harry Lee Danziger
- Starring: Vincent Ball; Lisa Daniely; Peter Illing
- Cinematography: James Wilson (as Jimmy Wilson)
- Edited by: Bill Lewthwaite
- Music by: Bill LeSage
- Production company: Danziger Productions
- Distributed by: United Artists Corporation (UK)
- Release date: 1961
- Running time: 59 minutes
- Country: United Kingdom
- Language: English

The Middle Course is a 1961 British low budget second feature ('B') war film directed by Montgomery Tully and starring Vincent Ball, Lisa Daniely and Peter Illing. It was written by Brian Clemens and produced by The Danzigers.

== Plot ==
During World War II, a Canadian pilot crash lands in a small French village occupied by German forces. The villagers find a useful ally in the young flyer, but the Germans become anxious to eliminate the force behind the strengthened local resistance.

== Cast ==
- Vincent Ball as Cliff
- Lisa Daniely as Anna
- Peter Illing as Gromik
- Roland Bartrop as Paul
- Marne Maitland as Renard
- Robert Rietti as Jacques
- André Maranne as Franz
- André Mikhelson as Commandant
- Jan Conrad as Herman
- John Serret as Leverne
- William Abney as Jaghorst
- Yvonne André as Martine
- Julian Sherrier as villager
- Donald Tandy as Sgt. Wilhelm
- Jacques Cey as Pierre

== Critical reception ==
The Monthly Film Bulletin wrote: "Tinpot death-or-glory war film, peopled by theatrical characters spouting trite dialogue against unconvincing backgrounds."

TV Guide called the film "a predictable type of war drama that went out of fashion in the US ten years before this was made, but probably will always be resurrected in a nation that suffered so much at the time."
