= West of Suez =

1957 British film by Arthur Crabtree

- U.S. theatrical poster
- Directed by: Arthur Crabtree
- Screenplay by: Norman Hudis
- Based on: an original story by Charles F. Vetter (as Lance Hargreaves) and Norman Hudis
- Produced by: Richard Gordon
- Starring: Keefe Brasselle
- Cinematography: Walter J. Harvey (as James Harvey)
- Edited by: Peter Mayhew
- Music by: Wilfred Burns (uncredited)
- Production company: Amalgamated Productions
- Distributed by: Astral (UK)
- Release date: 1957
- Running time: 74 minutes
- Country: United Kingdom
- Language: English

West of Suez (U.S. title The Fighting Wildcats) is a 1957 British drama film directed by Arthur Crabtree and starring Keefe Brasselle, Kay Callard and Karel Stepanek. The screenplay was by Norman Hudis from a story by Hudis and Charles F. Vetter (as Lance Hargreaves).

== Premise ==
An adventurer is hired to assassinate the leader of an Arab movement advocating peace, but is unable to complete his mission.

== Cast ==
- Keefe Brasselle as Brett Manders
- Kay Callard as Pat
- Karel Stepanek as Langford
- Ursula Howells as Eileen
- Bruce Seton as Major Osborne
- Richard Shaw as Cross
- Harry Fowler as Tommy
- Sheldon Lawrence as Jeff
- Alex Gallier as Ibrahim Sayed
- Maya Koumani as Men Hassa

== Production ==
Braselle was meant to direct as well as star but could not get a permit to do so from the British trade union, so producer Richard Gordon replaced him with Arthur Crabtree.

== Critical reception ==
The Monthly Film Bulletin wrote: "This Anglo-American thriller contains plenty of vigorous action, but the story has many weaknesses, and the characterisation is thinly conventional. Of the international cast, Keefe Brasselle makes an effective Brett and Karel Stepanek is suavely sinister as the German conspirator Langford. Above average camerawork shows off the Middle East backgrounds to good effect."

Kine Weekly wrote: "Colourful action melodrama, staged in the Middle East and London. ... Vigorously acted by a talented international cast, ambitiously mounted and generously flavoured with sex, it hands out plenty of thrills. Just the stuff to give the ninepennies. ... Its backgrounds are suitably varied, and the climax, although grim, is showmanlike. In all, hearty, bustling hokum."

Picture Show wrote: "Fast moving with plenty of thrills and an attractive leading lady in the form of Kay Callard."

TV Guide called it an "okay suspense story with a dull romantic subplot."

In British Sound Films: The Studio Years 1928–1959 David Quinlan rated the film as "average", writing: "Interesting suspense drama slowed down by love interest."
