= Hey! Hey! USA =

- Theatrical release poster
- Directed by: Marcel Varnel
- Written by: J. O. C. Orton
- Produced by: Michael Balcon
- Starring: Will Hay; Edgar Kennedy; Edmon Ryan; David Burns
- Cinematography: Arthur Crabtree
- Edited by: R. E. Dearing
- Music by: Charles Williams
- Distributed by: Gainsborough Pictures
- Release date: October 1938
- Running time: 88 minutes
- Country: United Kingdom
- Language: English

Hey! Hey! USA is a 1938 British comedy film directed by Marcel Varnel and starring Will Hay, Edgar Kennedy and Eddie Ryan. It was written by J. O. C. Orton. A porter accidentally finds himself on a ship bound for the United States. The film features an early appearance by child actor Roddy McDowall.

== Plot ==
Benjamin Twist, a teacher working during school holidays as a ship's porter ends up on a ship bound for America and impersonating a professor, Phineas Tavistock. Along with American gangster and stowaway Bugs Leary, Twist finds himself entangled in a plot to kidnap the son of a millionaire whom 'Professor' Tavistock is teaching. Things are further complicated by the fact that two sets of gangsters are attempting to get their hands on the ransom money, which Twist is given to hand over.

== Cast ==
- Will Hay as Dr. Benjamin Twist / Professor Phineas Tavistock
- Edgar Kennedy as "Bugs" Leary
- David Burns as Tony Ricardo
- Eddie Ryan as "Ace" Marco
- Fred Duprez as Cyrus Schultz
- Paddy Reynolds as Mrs. Schultz
- Tommy Bupp as Bertie Schultz
- Arthur Goullet as "Glove" Johnson
- Gibb McLaughlin as steward
- Eddie Pola as broadcast announcer
- Roddy McDowall as boy
- Peter Gawthorne as ship's Captain
- Charlie Hall as Leary's pal
- Charles Oliver as "Curly"
- Danny Green as McGuire, the Chicago cop
- John Salew (uncredited)
- Hugh McDermott (uncredited)

== Production ==
The film was one of several Ted Black produced with Will Hay at Gainsborough.

== Reception ==
=== Box office ===
Kine Weekly reported the film did well at the British box office in December 1938.

=== Critical ===
Kine Weekly wrote: "Riotous gangster comedy burlesque, swiftly played against Chicago backgrounds of flawless creation. Will Hay and Edgar Kennedy form an irresistible Anglo-American team. Laughable capital is made out of every clever gag and situation. Support is first-rate and so are the story and dialogue. In the language of the box-office, the film is in the bag. Excellent general booking."

The Monthly Film Bulletin wrote: "This boisterous story is full of incident and slapstick. ... Will Hay seems a trifle subdued, and rather lost without his familiar stooges. But Edgar Kennedy is in his element. He makes good use of ample opportunities to exploit his particular brand of humour, and the result is very funny. Tommy Bupp is good as the odious small boy, and the supporting players are competent. The production is on a lavish scale, and the settings are varied and effective."

Sky Movies wrote: "The incomparable Will Hay reprises his splendidly shifty Dr Benjamin Twist character (the incompetent headmaster of St Michael's) in this breezy British comedy set in a quaintly observed America full of gun-toting gangsters. Comic stalwart Edgar Kennedy provides slow-burning support under the direction of Marcel Varnel, the dapper Frenchman who made most of Hay's biggest successes."
