= Lilli Marlene =

1950 film by Arthur Crabtree

- US cinema poster
- Directed by: Arthur Crabtree
- Written by: Leslie Wood
- Screenplay by: Leslie Wood
- Produced by: William J. Gell
- Starring: Lisa Daniely; Hugh McDermott; Stanley Baker
- Cinematography: Jack Asher
- Edited by: Lister Laurance
- Music by: Stanley Black
- Production company: William Gell Productions
- Distributed by: Monarch Film Corporation(UK); RKO Radio Pictures (US)
- Release dates: 8 December 1950 (UK); 25 July 1951 (US)
- Running time: 85 minutes
- Country: United Kingdom
- Language: English

Lilli Marlene is a 1950 British war film aimed for the US market and directed by Arthur Crabtree. It was written by Leslie Wood and stars Lisa Daniely, Hugh McDermott, and Richard Murdoch. Stanley Baker is seen in one of his early support roles.

== Plot ==
A French girl named Lilli Marlene, working in her uncle's café in Benghazi, Libya, turns out to be the girl that the popular German wartime song Lili Marleen had been written for before the war, so both the British and the Germans try to use her for propaganda purposes – especially as it turns out that she can sing as well. The Germans try to snatch her at one point, but don't succeed, and she performs several times for the British troops and also appears in radio broadcasts to the US, arranged by Steve, an American war correspondent embedded with the British Eighth Army, who eventually becomes her boyfriend.

Later, the Germans successfully kidnap her in Cairo and she is taken to Berlin, where she is interrogated and repeatedly told that she had been tortured and brainwashed by the British to think that she was French, when she actually is German. Once the Germans think that she has been transformed into a loyal Nazi, they set her to make broadcasts in English for the Third Reich. Her old British friends, and especially Steve, are very disappointed in her.

After the war, she reappears in London during a big reunion for members of the Eighth Army. She manages to convince Steve and a few of her other Eighth Army friends that she never betrayed the British; however, British security agents try to arrest her. Steve and another old friend, Berry, take off with her in their broadcasting van, chased by the security people. They drive to an address in London that she had been given by the German colonel in charge of her broadcasts, in case she ever went to London and was in need of help. When they get there, she finds that the German colonel lives in it. It turns out that he is actually a British intelligence officer who was working undercover in Berlin during the war. He informs them and the security people that Lilli was never a traitor, and that, in all her communications, there were encoded messages to the British intelligence services back in London.

Once they know the truth, Steve and Berry take her back to the reunion, where everybody is told that Lilli never was a traitor. She sings the Lili Marleen song for all of them and afterwards she and Steve kiss.

== Main cast ==
- Lisa Daniely as Lilli Marlene
- Hugh McDermott as Steve
- Richard Murdoch as Flight-Lieutenant Murdoch
- Leslie Dwyer as Berry
- Estelle Brody as Estelle
- Stanley Baker as Evans
- John Blythe as Holt
- Cecil Brock as O'Riley
- Russell Hunter as Scottie
- Marcel Poncin as Lestoque
- Judith Warden as Auntie
- Michael Ward as Wintertree
- Lawrence O'Madden as Col. Wharton
- Stuart Lindsell as Major Phillips
- Olaf Olsen as Nazi Officer
- Irene Prador as Nurse Schmidt
- Aud Johansen as Nurse Melke
- Carl Jaffe as Propaganda Chief
- Philo Hauser as Fratzell
- Richard Marner as SS Colonel
- Peter Swanwick as Chief Interrogator
- Walter Gotell as Direktor of Propaganda
- Arthur Lawrence as Lieber
- Rufus Cruikshank as Sgt. Bull
- Barbara Cummings as Shirley
- Neil Tuson as Producer
- Conrad Phillips as Security Officer
- Kenneth Cleveland as Security Officer
- Ben Williams as Brownie

== Follow-up film ==
In 1953 Arthur Crabtree made a follow-up film with the same actors playing Marlene and Steve: The Wedding of Lilli Marlene.

== Reception ==
The film was a hit at the British box office, being judged by Kinematograph Weekly as a "notable performer" at British cinemas in 1951.

The Monthly Film Bulletin wrote: "The film steers its way unevenly through a variety of implausible situations, but with the title song persuasively sung by Lisa Daniely and liberal doses of army humour, makes agreeable enough entertainment."

In British Sound Films: The Studio Years 1928–1959 David Quinlan rated the film as "average", writing: "Winds its way agreeable through a series of rather implausible situations."
