= Grey Blake =

British actor (1902–1971)

- Born: Grey Wilson Blake; 30 September 1902; Liverpool, England
- Died: 4 June 1971 (aged 68); Nice, France
- Occupation: Actor
- Spouses: Ruth Grundy; Lisa Daniely (m. 1952–1971)

Grey Blake (1902–1971) was a British stage, film and television actor.

Amongst his stage appearances was as Peter Quilpe in the original Broadway production of The Cocktail Party by T.S. Eliot at Henry Miller's Theatre in 1950. He reprised his role in a BBC TV version of the play, broadcast January 1952.

Blake was married to the actresses Ruth Grundy and Lisa Daniely.

== Filmography ==
- Java Head (1934)
- Youthful Folly (1934)
- Somewhere in Civvies (1943)
- Tawny Pipit (1944)
- Twilight Hour (1945)
- Jassy (1947)
- Broken Journey (1948)
- Easy Money (1948)
- The Lost People (1949)
- The Dancing Years (1950)
- Traveller's Joy (1951)
- The Night Won't Talk (1952)
- Paul Temple Returns (1952)
