= All Rights Reserved (play) =

1935 comedy play by N. C. Hunter

- Written by: N.C. Hunter
- Original language: English
- Genre: Comedy

Premiere
- Date premiered: 25 February 1935
- Place premiered: King's Theatre, Hammersmith

All Rights Reserved is a 1935 comedy play by the British writer N.C. Hunter.

It was first performed at the King's Theatre in Hammersmith. It then transferred to the Criterion Theatre, where it ran for 86 performances between 30 April and 13 July 1935. The cast included Nora Swinburne, Ronald Squire, Edmund Breon and Esma Cannon.

== Bibliography ==
- Wearing, J.P. The London Stage 1930-1939: A Calendar of Productions, Performers, and Personnel. Rowman & Littlefield, 2014.
