= Hindle Wakes (1952 film) =

British drama by Arthur Crabtree

- Directed by: Arthur Crabtree
- Written by: John Baines
- Based on: Hindle Wakes by Stanley Houghton
- Produced by: Philip Brandon; William J. Gell
- Starring: Lisa Daniely; Brian Worth; Leslie Dwyer; Sandra Dorne
- Cinematography: Geoffrey Faithfull
- Edited by: Max Benedict
- Music by: Stanley Black
- Production company: Monarch Film Corporation
- Distributed by: Monarch Film Corporation
- Release date: 10 November 1952
- Running time: 82 minutes
- Country: United Kingdom
- Language: English

Hindle Wakes is a 1952 British drama film, directed by Arthur Crabtree and starring Lisa Daniely, Brian Worth, Leslie Dwyer and Sandra Dorne. It was the fourth screen adaptation of the 1912 play by Stanley Houghton, dealing with a young woman engaging in a holiday sexual flirtation, regardless of the disapproval of her parents or wider society.

== Plot ==
Lancashire mill-girls Jenny Hawthorne and Mary Hollins go on holiday to Blackpool during the annual wakes week in their hometown of Hindle. They run into Alan Jeffcote, the son of the owner of the mill in which they work, who has also travelled to Blackpool with a group of friends while his fiancée is detained on business in London. Jenny had admired Alan from afar in the factory and they hit it off immediately. When they go off on their own together, he persuades her to leave Blackpool to spend the week with him at Llandudno. To cover her tracks, Jenny takes Mary's advice and writes a postcard for Mary to post to her parents later in the week. She and Alan leave their friends and set off for Llandudno, where he books them into a hotel on the front as Mr and Mrs Jeffcote.

Shortly afterwards, Mary is involved in a serious boating accident and is killed. Her possessions are returned to Hindle and the unsent postcard is found in her luggage. Jenny's parents are already suspicious and concerned by the fact that Jenny has not returned to Hindle as they would have expected in view of such a tragic turn to her holiday, and the discovery of the postcard increases their fears. When Jenny returns at the end of the week, her parents ask about her holiday, and allow her to dig a hole for herself as her fictitious account shows she is unaware of Mary's death and has clearly not spent the week in Blackpool. When confronted with the truth, Jenny is distraught at Mary's death and admits to where she has been, and with whom, but defiantly refuses to feel guilty or immoral.

The Hawthornes decide that they will confront the Jeffcotes with their son's unacceptable behaviour. Mrs. Hawthorne's anger is tempered by the fact that she believes the situation may be turned to financial advantage. Hawthorne feels some trepidation, as he and Jeffcote have been friends since childhood and have remained on good terms despite Jeffcote's rise to social prominence. To the surprise of Mr Hawthorne, Jeffcote agrees that the proper thing to do is for Alan to marry Jenny. Mrs. Jeffcote is less convinced, because of the loss of his expected marriage to the daughter of another local factory owner, who breaks off their engagement when Alan tells her what has happened. A meeting is convened between the families. Jenny and Alan remain silent while their parents try to agree the details of their marriage, and Mrs. Hawthorne and Mrs. Jeffcote become involved in a shouting match. Jenny then announces that she has no interest in marrying Alan and that for both of them it was just a "little fling". Her parents are shocked, and her mother sobs inconsolably. Alan and his mother are surprised but relieved, and he quickly phones and makes up with his fiancée. Jenny resumes her relationship with her admirer at the factory.

== Cast ==
- Lisa Daniely as Jenny Hawthorne
- Brian Worth as Alan Jeffcote
- Leslie Dwyer as Chris Hawthorne
- Sandra Dorne as Mary Hollins
- Joan Hickson as Mrs. Hawthorne
- Ronald Adam as Mr. Jeffcote
- Mary Clare as Mrs. Jeffcote
- Michael Medwin as George Ackroyd
- Bill Travers as Bob
- Beatrice Varley as Mrs. Hollins
- Tim Turner as Tommy Dykes
- Rita Webb as Mrs. Slaughter
- Lloyd Pearson as Tim Farrer
- Diana Hope as Betty Farrer
- Ben Williams as Jimmy
- Ian Wilson as Mr. Fred Slaughter
- Roy Russell as Jackson, the butler
- Judy Vann as Jeffcote's secretary
- Cyril Smith as hotel porter
- Edward Evans as chauffeur
- Alastair Hunter as Police Sergeant
- Neil Hallett as Bob's cousin

== Production ==
The film was produced and distributed by the independent Monarch Film Corporation. It was made at the Merton Park Studios in London with sets designed by the art director Andrew Mazzei. Location shooting took place in Blackpool and Llandudno.

== Reception ==
Monthly Film Bulletin said "This well-known Lancashire piece has been turned into a modest, efficient and quite agreeable little film. Glimpses of the cotton mills, of the Hindle inmates, of Blackpool amusement park and Wakes Week give it a lively background and, although the acting is generally rather weak, the entertainment as a whole has simple and direct appeal."

Kine Weekly wrote "The picture takes a little time to warm up – its initial Cook's tour of Blackpool and Llandudno, although colourful and conducive to correct atmosphere, is somewhat repetitious – but the concluding chapters, culminating with the heroine's defiant stand against convention, express sentiments that are certain to appeal to the majority. Lisa Daniely looks attractive at all times and impresses in the big scene as Jenny, and Brian Worth is very true to type as the weak and vacillating Alan. Joan Hickson excels as the spiteful and grasping Mrs. Hawthorne and gives validity to the soundly chosen supporting cast, which includes extras recruited from visitors to the 1952 CEA Conference. The interiors are more than adequate, and so is the musical accompaniment. "

The Radio Times Guide to Films gave the film 3/5 stars, writing: "This is a weak adaptation of Stanley Houghton's theatrical warhorse about cross-class love in the early years of the last century. The story of a Lancashire mill lass who refuses to marry the boss's son after spending her summer factory holiday with him at Blackpool is hardly likely to raise the eyebrows of the prudish or the pulse rate of the thrill-seeker." In British Sound Films: The Studio Years 1928–1959 David Quinlan rated the film as "average", writing: "Strangely cast old chestnut has dated emotional appeal." Leslie Halliwell said: "Modestly competent version of a semi-classic play about class distinctions."
