= For Freedom (1940 film) =

- Directed by: Maurice Elvey; Castleton Knight
- Written by: Leslie Arliss; Miles Malleson
- Produced by: Edward Black; Maurice Ostrer; Castleton Knight
- Starring: Will Fyffe; Anthony Hulme; Guy Middleton
- Cinematography: Arthur Crabtree
- Edited by: R.E. Dearing; Alfred Roome
- Music by: Walter Goehr; Louis Levy
- Production company: Gainsborough Pictures
- Distributed by: General Film Distributors
- Release date: 4 May 1940
- Running time: 87 minutes
- Country: United Kingdom
- Language: English

For Freedom is a 1940 British drama film directed by Maurice Elvey and Castleton Knight, and starring Will Fyffe, Guy Middleton, and Terry-Thomas. It was written by Leslie Arliss and Miles Malleson, and was made largely for propaganda purposes during the Second World War. Through its blending of fiction and documentary it was similar to The Lion Has Wings (1939) produced by Alexander Korda's London Films.

== Synopsis ==
The film portrays the early events of the war, particularly the Battle of the River Plate, from the point of view of a British newsreel production company.

== Cast ==
- Will Fyffe as Chief
- Anthony Hulme as Steve
- E. V. H. Emmett as Ted
- Guy Middleton as Pierre
- Albert Lieven as Fritz
- Hugh McDermott as Sam
- Arthur Goullet as Ivan
- Terry-Thomas as newsreader
- Captain Dove as himself
- Captain Pottinger as himself
- First Officer Murphy as himself
- Engineer Walker as himself
- Engineer Angel as himself
- John Ernest Harper as himself

== Reception ==
According to Kinematograph Weekly the film did well at the British box office in May 1940.

The Monthly Film Bulletin wrote: "The framework of this story is original, ingenious and appropriate. The result combines magnificent, inspiring and thrilling spectacle with the unswerving regard for accuracy typical of the documentary at its best. The events leading up to the war are eficctively shown, and bitingly but not bitterly commented upon by Will Fyffe, whose shrewd and pawky humour is exactly right and telling. The battle scenes introduced and commented upon by Vice-Adumiral Harper are breath-taking and unforgettable, and most impressively reconstructed. The telling has dignity, restraint, and a sense of values and proportion. All the actors, professional and amateur, give of their best, and very good this is."

Kine Weekly wrote: "Spectacular melodrama, inspired by a great and glorious Naval occasion, presenting at one and the same time epic adventure, impressive documentary, and thrilling confirmation of Britain's supremacy on the high seas. Victory at the battle of River Plate is, together with superb shots of the magnificent Altmark incident, the piece de résistance of the inspiring patriotic scheme, and each s re-enacted by many who, took part in the memorable engagement. Rigid regard for accuracy and atmosphere is not the least of the film's many showmanlike qualities."

In British Sound Films: The Studio Years 1928–1959 David Quinlan rated the film as "very good", writing: "excellent semi-documentary strikes just the right note."

== Bibliography ==
- Chapman, James. The British at War: Cinema, State, and Propaganda, 1939-1945. I.B. Tauris Publishers, 1998.
