= Reunion in Vienna =

1933 film by Sidney Franklin

- Directed by: Sidney Franklin
- Written by: Robert Emmet Sherwood (play Reunion in Vienna); Ernest Vajda; Claudine West
- Produced by: Louis B. Mayer; Irving Thalberg
- Starring: John Barrymore
- Cinematography: George J. Folsey
- Edited by: Blanche Sewell
- Music by: William Axt; Paul Marquardt
- Production company: Metro-Goldwyn-Mayer
- Distributed by: Loew's, Inc.
- Release date: June 16, 1933
- Running time: 100 minutes
- Country: United States
- Language: English
- Budget: $478,000
- Box office: $643,000

Reunion in Vienna is a 1933 American pre-Code romantic drama produced and distributed by MGM. Sidney Franklin served as director. The film is starring John Barrymore in a story taken from the 1931 stage play of the same name by Robert Emmet Sherwood.

== Plot ==
An archduke who had been banished from Austria returns to Vienna for a reunion of his old fellow aristocrats and meets up with the former love of his life, who is now married to a psychoanalyst.

== Cast ==
- John Barrymore as Archduke Rudolf von Habsburg
- Diana Wynyard as Elena Krug
- Frank Morgan as Dr. Anton Krug
- Henry Travers as Father Krug
- May Robson as Frau Lucher
- Eduardo Ciannelli as Pofferoff
- Una Merkel as Ilsa Hinrich
- Bodil Rosing as Kathie (Krug family's maid)
- Bela Loblov as Musician
- Morris Nussbaum as Musician
- Nella Walker as Countess Von Stainz
- Hebert Evans as Count Von Stainz

Unbilled

- Morris Ankrum as Bit Role
- Symona Boniface as Noblewoman
- John Davidson as Officer
- George Davis as Waiter
- Ferdinand Gottschalk as tour guide
- Tenen Holtz as Tourist with Drapes
- Alphonse Maartell as Nobleman
- Torben Meyer as Headwaiter Strumpf
- Edmund Mortimer as Tourist
- Paul Porcasi as Chef
- Lucien Prival as Colline, Waiter
- Edward Reinach as Aristocrat
- Tom Ricketts as Nobleman
- Rolfe Sedan as Valet
- Anders Van Haden as Aristocrat
- Ellinor Vanderveer as Noblewoman
- Dorothy Vernon as Tourist
- William von Hardenburg as Aristocrat

== Box office ==
The film grossed a total (domestic and foreign) of $643,000: $379,000 from the US and Canada and $264,000 elsewhere resulting in a loss of $134,000. It received an Academy Award nomination for Best Cinematography.
