= Arthur Crabtree =

British cinematographer and film director (1900–1975)

- Born: 29 October 1900; Shipley, Yorkshire, England, UK
- Died: 15 March 1975 (aged 74); Worthing, Sussex, England, UK
- Occupations: Director, cinematographer
- Years active: 1931–1961 (film and TV)

Arthur Crabtree (29 October 1900 in Shipley, Yorkshire, England – 15 March 1975 in Worthing, Sussex, England) was a British cinematographer and film director. He directed films with comedians such as Will Hay, the Crazy Gang and Arthur Askey and several of the Gainsborough melodramas.

== Cinematographer ==
Crabtree earliest credits as a cinematographer were for British International Pictures. He shot Out of the Blue (1931) with Jessie Matthews; Verdict of the Sea (1932); and The Maid of the Mountains (1932).

Crabtree worked for Michael Powell on Lazybones (1935) and The Love Test (1935), and was a camera operator on Victor Saville's First a Girl.

=== Gainsborough Pictures ===
Crabtree joined Gainsborough Pictures. He worked on The First Offence (1936) with John Mills; Pot Luck (1936) with Tom Walls and Ralph Lynn; Everybody Dance (1936) with Cicely Courtneidge; and All In (1936) with Lynn for director Marcel Varnel.

Crabtree went on to Good Morning, Boys (1937) with Will Hay; The Great Barrier (1937) with Richard Arlen, shot partly on location in Canada; Said O'Reilly to McNab (1937) with Will Mahoney and Will Fyffe; and Oh, Mr. Porter! (1937) with Hay.

Crabtree shot Bank Holiday (1938) for director Carol Reed starring Margaret Lockwood. He did Convict 99 (1938) with Hay; Alf's Button Afloat (1938) with The Crazy Gang for Varney; Old Bones of the River (1938) and Hey! Hey! USA (1938) with Hay; The Frozen Limits (1939) with The Crazy Gang. Most of these films were directed by Marcel Varnel. So was Where's That Fire? (1940) with Hay; and Band Waggon (1940) with Arthur Askey. He did some photography work on Neutral Port (1940).

Crabtree shot For Freedom (1940) with Will Fyffe; Charley's (Big-Hearted) Aunt (1940) with Askey; and Neutral Port (1940) with Fyffe. He did a short for director Anthony Asquith, Channel Incident (1941) and one for Herbert Mason, Mr. Proudfoot Shows a Light (1941).

After working on Gasbags (1941) with the Crazy Gang, Crabtree was used by Carol Reed on Kipps (1941) at Fox. For that company he also made Inspector Hornleigh Goes to It (1941); and Once a Crook (1941), and another short for Asquith, Rush Hour (1941).

Back at Gainsborough, Crabtree shot I Thank You (1941) with Askey. After doing South American George (1941) with George Formby at Columbia, he worked on Uncensored (1942) for Asquith at Gainbsorough.

Crabtree made another film with Formby at Columbia Pictures, Much Too Shy (1942), then went back to Gainbsorough for King Arthur Was a Gentleman (1942) with Askey.

=== Gainsborough melodramas ===
Crabtree was cinematographer on Gainsborough's The Man in Grey (1943), a box-office hit which started the Gainsborough melodrama cycle and made stars of James Mason, Margaret Lockwood, Phyllis Calvert and Stewart Granger. He shot a comedy with Lockwood, Dear Octopus (1943), then did another melodrama, Fanny by Gaslight (1944), directed by Asquith and starring Calvert, Granger and Mason, another huge success. Crabtree followed this with Waterloo Road (1945) starring Granger and John Mills, directed by Sidney Gilliat.

== Director ==
Crabtree had filmed some of Gainsborough's biggest successes and the studio promoted him to director for Madonna of the Seven Moons (1945) with Calvert and Granger. Phyllis Calvert later recalled:

Arthur was a very good cinematographer, but there weren't enough directors, and so people who were scriptwriters or were behind the camera were suddenly made directors. It wasn't that Crabtree was an unsatisfactory director, just that we found ourselves very satisfactory – we did it ourselves. But the fact that he had been a lighting cameraman was wonderful for us, because he knew exactly how to photograph us.

The film was a commercial success. So too was Crabtree's second effort as director, They Were Sisters (1945) with Calvert and Mason, and his third, Caravan (1946) with Granger.

Crabtree directed a thriller with Eric Portman and Greta Gynt, Dear Murderer (1947). He followed this with The Calendar (1948), with Gynt, and was one of the directors on Quartet (1948).

=== Post-Gainsborough ===
Crabtree directed Don't Ever Leave Me (1949), a comedy, then Lilli Marlene (1950), a war film. He made Hindle Wakes (1952), The Wedding of Lilli Marlene (1953) and Stryker of the Yard (also 1953). Crabtree moved into television, directing episodes of Colonel March of Scotland Yard, The Adventures of Sir Lancelot, Rheingold Theatre, and The Adventures of Robin Hood.

Crabtree moved into "B" films. He made Morning Call (1957), then did West of Suez (1958) for producer Richard Gordon starring Keefe Brasselle. He made Death Over My Shoulder (1958) with Brasselle, then did another for Gordon, Fiend Without a Face (1958).

After directing episodes of the television series Ivanhoe, he helmed Horrors of the Black Museum (1959) for producer Herman Cohen and a 1961 episode of the Stryker of the Yard series.

== Personal life ==
Crabtree married Marguerite Vanière, whom he met as one of the dancers in the chorus line of Evergreen (1934), and with whom he had three children, Richard (b. 1938), Robert (b. 1948) and Loretta (b. 1953). Their parents told them that they could take up any career but the theatre, because of the uncertainty of that profession. Robert taught for more than 40 years at Yale University, where he developed what came to be known as Crabtree's catalyst.

== Filmography ==
=== Cinematographer ===
- Out of the Blue (1931)
- The Maid of the Mountains (1932)
- Verdict of the Sea (1932)
- Lazybones (1935)
- The Love Test (1935)
- The First Offence (1936)
- All In (1936)
- Pot Luck (1936)
- Good Morning, Boys (1937)
- Said O'Reilly to McNab (1937)
- The Great Barrier (1937)
- Oh, Mr. Porter! (1937)
- Alf's Button Afloat (1938)
- Hey! Hey! USA (1938)
- Old Bones of the River (1938)
- Bank Holiday (1938)
- Convict 99 (1938)
- The Frozen Limits (1939)
- Where's That Fire? (1940)
- Band Waggon (1940)
- For Freedom (1940)
- Charley's (Big-Hearted) Aunt (1940)
- Neutral Port (1940)
- Gasbags (1941)
- Kipps (1941)
- Inspector Hornleigh Goes to It (1941)
- Once a Crook (1941)
- I Thank You (1941)
- South American George (1941)
- Uncensored (1942)
- Much Too Shy (1942)
- King Arthur Was a Gentleman (1942)
- The Man in Grey (1943)
- Dear Octopus (1943)
- Fanny by Gaslight (1944)
- Waterloo Road (1945)

=== Director ===
- Madonna of the Seven Moons (1945)
- They Were Sisters (1945)
- Caravan (1946)
- Dear Murderer (1947)
- Quartet (1948)
- The Calendar (1948)
- Don't Ever Leave Me (1949)
- Lilli Marlene (1951)
- Hindle Wakes (1952)
- The Wedding of Lilli Marlene (1953)
- Stryker of the Yard (1953, TV series)
- Rheingold Theatre (1954, TV series)
- Colonel March of Scotland Yard (1955, TV series)
- The Adventures of Sir Lancelot (1956, TV series)
- The Adventures of Robin Hood (1956, TV series)
- Morning Call (1957)
- West of Suez (1957)
- Ivanhoe (1958, TV series)
- Death Over My Shoulder (1958)
- Fiend Without a Face (1958)
- Horrors of the Black Museum (1959)
