= Let Tyrants Tremble! =

1946 play

- Written by: Bernard Miles
- Original language: English
- Genre: Comedy

Premiere
- Date premiered: 11 March 1946
- Place premiered: Scala Theatre, London

Let Tyrants Tremble! is a 1946 comedy play by the British writer Bernard Miles revolving around a unit of the Home Guard.

It was staged at the Scala Theatre in London's West End, running for 28 performances between 11 March and 13 April 1946. The original cast included Miles, Arthur Hambling, Erik Chitty, Oliver Gordon and John Blythe. It was staged by the impresario Prince Littler.

== Bibliography ==
- Davies, Andrew. Other Theatres: Development of Alternative and Experimental Theatre in Britain. Macmillan, 1987.
- Wearing, J.P. The London Stage 1940-1949: A Calendar of Productions, Performers, and Personnel. Rowman & Littlefield, 2014.
