= Horrors of the Black Museum =

1959 British film by Arthur Crabtree

- Theatrical release poster
- Directed by: Arthur Crabtree
- Written by: Herman Cohen; Aben Kandel
- Produced by: Herman Cohen; Jack Greenwood; Nat Cohen
- Starring: Michael Gough; June Cunningham; Graham Curnow; Shirley Anne Field
- Cinematography: Desmond Dickinson
- Edited by: Geoffrey Muller
- Music by: Gerard Schurmann
- Production companies: Anglo-Amalgamated; Carmel Productions
- Distributed by: American International Pictures (US); Anglo-Amalgamated (UK)
- Release date: 22 April 1959 (US)
- Running time: 94 minutes (with prologue); 81 minutes (without prologue)
- Country: United Kingdom
- Language: English
- Budget: $164,000 (est.) or £40,000
- Box office: over $1 million or over £1 million

Horrors of the Black Museum is a 1959 British horror film directed by Arthur Crabtree and starring Michael Gough, June Cunningham, Graham Curnow and Shirley Anne Field. It was filmed in Color and CinemaScope, and most of the financing came from the United States. The credited producer was Jack Greenwood, but Herman Cohen says this came about to ensure the film qualified for the Eady levy, and in fact, Greenwood was more of an associate producer assisting Cohen. The film was released in the US on April 22, 1959, on a double feature with The Headless Ghost (1959).

It was the first film in what film critic David Pirie dubbed Anglo-Amalgamated's "Sadian trilogy" (the other two being Circus of Horrors (1960) and Peeping Tom (1960)), with an emphasis on sadism, cruelty and violence (with sexual undertones), in contrast to the supernatural horror of the Hammer films of the same era. Cohen says when the movie was released years later on television, they had to take off the hypnotism prologue "because it does hypnotize some people."

== Plot ==
A package is delivered to Gail, a young blonde woman with a roommate named Peggy. Gail opens the package to find a pair of binoculars, but when she uses them to look out a window, she screams and collapses, dying. The binoculars are revealed to have two spikes emerging out of the eyepiece.

Peggy is being interviewed by Superintendent Graham and Inspector Lodge when journalist and crime writer Edmond Bancroft enters the room. He wishes to see the binoculars for himself, and Graham remarks on their similarity to binoculars in Scotland Yard's "Black Museum".

Bancroft then purchases a dagger at Aggie's antique shop. Returning to his house, he enters his secret basement museum with his assistant Rick. The museum exhibits various weapons and implements of torture used by criminals.

Bancroft visits his doctor, Dr. Ballan, and tells him that he cannot rest until the killer is apprehended. Ballan observes that Bancroft goes into a state of shock after the murders, noting that he needs psychiatric treatment and should be hospitalized.

Bancroft later visits his mistress Joan in her flat, who argues with him, asking for money and calling him a cripple. Joan leaves her apartment for a bar where she dances provocatively to music from a jukebox. She returns to her flat and prepares to sleep, but when she lays down on her bed she gasps, seeing a guillotine and a man with a hideous face above her bed frame. When the guillotine blade falls she screams, gathering curious neighbors at her door. The hideous man pushes his way through this crowd when he makes his escape. Graham investigates, questioning the crowd of neighbors who mention the man's strange appearance.

At a cocktail party, Graham tells Bancroft that the police have captured Tom Rivers, who has confessed to the murders. Rivers later admits to various other famous crimes, revealing himself to be a fantasist, but Graham keeps Rivers to try to capture the true culprit. Bancroft hears of Rivers' confession and requests to see Rivers, but Graham explains that Rivers has been sent to a mental hospital.

Rick sneaks away from his duties with Bancroft to meet his fiancée, Angela, and he explains that he is being hypnotized and controlled by Bancroft.

When Bancroft returns to the antique shop to purchase ice tongs, Aggie reveals that she knows that Bancroft uses the weapons he buys to murder. She demands £1200 for the tongs to not tell the police. Bancroft uses the tongs to murder her.

Ballan visits Bancroft and explains that he needs psychiatric help. Bancroft knocks out the doctor with a laser from his machine in his basement "Black museum". Rick chains the body then lowers it into a vat of acid. When Rick pulls out the chain only a skeleton is left.

After signing copies of his books at an event, Bancroft returns to his basement museum to find Rick with Angela. When Angela leaves, Bancroft injects Rick with a drug to better control his actions. Bancroft explains that Rick will inherit the "Black museum" when Bancroft dies and commands Rick to deal with Angela.

Later, at a carnival, Angela and Rick ride in the Tunnel of Love. Towards the end of the tunnel, a transformed and hideous Rick takes out a knife and stabs Angela, killing her. Fleeing through the hall of mirrors, Rick is chased by police up a Ferris Wheel. Bancroft is with Graham when he hears that the murderer is trapped. They both arrive at the carnival where policemen are asking Rick to climb down. Rick addresses Bancroft, saying, "I did what you told me." Bancroft frantically urges the policemen to kill the monster before he reveals Bancroft's secret. Rick jumps from the wheel and plunges his knife into Bancroft's heart.

Looking at the two men on the ground, Superintendent Graham observes that Bancroft used Rick as the tool for his murders, and remarks that the case of the "monster killer" has been solved.

== Cast ==
- Michael Gough as Edmond Bancroft
- June Cunningham as Joan Berkley
- Graham Curnow as Rick
- Shirley Anne Field as Angela Banks
- Geoffrey Keen as Superintendent Graham
- Gerald Andersen as Dr. Ballan
- John Warwick as Inspector Lodge
- Beatrice Varley as Aggie
- Austin Trevor as Commissioner Wayne
- Malou Pantera as Peggy
- Howard Greene as Tom Rivers
- Dorinda Stevens as Gail Dunlap
- Stuart Saunders as strength-test barker
- Hilda Barry as woman in hall
- Nora Gordon as woman in hall
- Vanda Godsell as Miss Ashton
- Gerald Case as bookshop manager
- Geoffrey Denton as sergeant at jail
- William Abney as patrol constable No. 1
- Howard Pays as patrol constable No. 2
- Frank Henderson as medical examiner
- Garard Green as fingerprint expert
- Sydney Bromley as neighbour
- John Harvey as man in bookshop
- Marianne Stone as neighbour

== Production ==
Producer Herman Cohen said he got the idea for the film after reading a series of newspaper articles about Scotland Yard's Black Museum. He arranged through a contact to visit the museum, then wrote a treatment and later collaborated with Aben Kandel on the screenplay. Cohen says the use of binoculars as murder weapons, and all the other instruments of death in the film, were based on real-life murder cases.

Half the money for the budget was provided by Nat Cohen and Stuart Levy of Anglo-Amalgamated in the UK, the other half from American International Pictures. It was their second co production, following Cat Girl. It was the first movie from AIP in CinemaScope and colour.

The credited producer was Jack Greenwood, but Herman Cohen says this came about to ensure the film qualified for the Eady levy, and in fact, Greenwood was more of an associate producer assisting Cohen.

Cohen wanted to hire Vincent Price for the lead and also considered Orson Welles, but Anglo-Amalgamated pushed for a British actor in the lead, as it would be cheaper, so they decided to use Michael Gough. Arthur Crabtree was hired on the basis of his work on Fiend Without a Face (1958). "The price was right, and the old guy needed a job and I hired him", recalled Cohen. "And he was exactly what I wanted and needed as a good craftsman."

A thirteen-minute prologue featuring hypnotist Emile Franchele and HypnoVista was added for the US release by James H. Nicholson of AIP, who felt the movie needed another gimmick. "We tested it in a few theaters, and the audience went for it like crazy ... hokey as it was", recalled Cohen. "It helped make the picture a success, I guess, 'cause people were looking for gimmicks at that time."

== Release ==
The film was given a wide release in the US on a double bill with The Headless Ghost (1959).

It was very popular and earned over $1 million in profits. According to Kinematograph Weekly the film performed "better than average" at the British box office in 1959. Filmink called it "a blockbuster" which inspired Anglo Amalgamated to make Circus of Horrors.

Cohen estimated 72% of the audience for this sort of film was aged between 12 and 26.

Cohen says when the movie was released on television they had to take off the hypnotism prologue "because it does hypnotize some people."

The film was later inducted into the Museum of Modern Art at the behest of Martin Scorsese.

== Critical reception ==
Various retrospective commentators agree that the film can be adequately described as "shocking".

The Monthly Film Bulletin wrote: "For all its contemporary setting, the plot of this lurid melodrama relies almost entirely on hackneyed Gothic paraphernalia. It makes the merest nod towards medical jargon, never attempts to penetrate Bancroft's obsession, and gains any persuasion it may have from the Eastman Colour-and-CinemaScope trappings rather than from Michael Gough's conventional portrait of menace. At any rate, and given their brutalising intention, the scriptwriters have judged rightly in allowing their monster at least the appearance of a man."

Variety wrote: "Sheer horror for horror's sake is usually the refuge of the unimaginative and rarely clicks. Horrors of the Black Museum is a case in point. The producers have relied on sensationalism without subtlety of characterization, situation or dialog. As a result, this rather distasteful item is likely to gather more misplaced laughs than shudders among discriminating audiences. ... The story and screenplay by Aben Kandel and Herman Cohen is as full of holes as a fishing net. ... There is little to commend in [the film] except Desmond Dickinson's lensing. Michael Gough, as the murderer, sardonically ploughs through the screenplay while Geoffrey Keen makes as much of the cop as the role will allow. June Cunningham, Shirley Ann Field and Dorinda Stevens are three of the femme victims who meet their fate with appropriate hysteria. Arthur Crabtree's direction is plodding and even the climax falls lamentably flat."

The Radio Times Guide to Films gave the film 3/5 stars, writing: "This infamously lurid horror begins with one of the most memorably vicious shocks of the 1950s fear-era a girl unwrapping a gift of binoculars, looking through and having her eyes gouged by two spring-loaded metal spikes. Michael Gough stars as the arrogant crime book author who hypnotises his assistant into committing horrendous homicides to satisfy his readers' demands for gruesome detail. A tawdry catalogue of tortures, purple dialogue and risible acting (wooden Shirley Anne Field), this crudely effective melodrama is a British exploitation classic.t"

Leslie Halliwell called the film: "A crude shocker."

In British Sound Films: The Studio Years 1928–1959 David Quinlan rated the film as "mediocre", writing: "Some critics attacked the censors for allowing this very nasty horror offering a certificate."

In Offbeat: British Cinema's Curiosities, Obscurities and Forgotten Items, Julian Upton writes: "Barking at his vacuous assistant, Gough scales heights of shaking fury that are as alarming as the murders themselves: it looks like his head could explode at any moment. He taps into shuddering, apoplectic rages that seem way out of proportion with the campy lines he has to deliver. But he counters this madness with the public persona of his celebrated crime writer: smooth but arrogant, aggravating the baffled police with his know-it-all theorising and dishing out snide comments to his fans with the scathing dryness of George Sanders in All About Eve (1950). Where, say, Peeping Tom at least appears to take itself very seriously, Gough makes Black Museum impossible to take seriously at all: from his two-tone hair-do to his 'baddie' limp, from his vile unctuousness to his blood-boiling incandescence, he is having the kind of ball here that only an exploitation film actor can have."
