= Well Done, Henry =

- Will Fyffe in the film
- Directed by: Wilfred Noy
- Written by: A. Barr-Smith; Selwyn Jepson; Wilfred Noy
- Produced by: Neville Clark
- Starring: Will Fyffe; Cathleen Nesbitt; Charles Hawtrey; Donald Gray
- Cinematography: Jack Parker
- Production company: Butcher's Film Service
- Distributed by: Butcher's Film Service
- Release date: 1936
- Running time: 86 minutes
- Country: United Kingdom
- Language: English

Well Done, Henry is a 1936 British comedy film directed by Wilfred Noy and starring Will Fyffe, Cathleen Nesbitt and Charles Hawtrey. It was written by A. Barr-Smith, Selwyn Jepson and Noy.

== Preservation status ==
The British Film Institute National Archive holds a collection of ephemera but no film or video materials.

== Plot ==
Henry MacNabb is an unsuccessful bank clerk trapped in a miserable home life with a tyrannical wife, an insufferable son, and a daughter mourning a ruined romance. His luck seems to change one morning when he is tasked with delivering high-value bearer bonds directly to the apartment of Sir James Gregg, the bank's chairman. However MacNabb accidentally blunders into the wrong flat, where an infuriated couple, who are expecting a visit from blackmailer, mistake him for the blackmailer's accomplice. After a chaotic misunderstanding, MacNabb improvises by impersonating a detective and successfully outwits the real blackmailer.

When he reaches the correct apartment, unknown to him, Sir James is lying tied up and gagged beneath the sofa, and MacNabb hands the bonds over to an international thief, not questioning why the "Chairman" suddenly speaks with a heavy foreign accent. When the real Sir James's muffled struggles are audible from under the sofa, MacNabb realizes he has been hoodwinked. Terrified but driven by a sudden surge of professional duty, the clerk knocks out the imposter and single-handedly deals with the entire gang. Deeply grateful, Sir James rewards him with a major promotion, allowing MacNabb to return home to a family that will finally treat him as the master of the house.

== Cast ==
- Will Fyffe as Henry McNab
- Cathleen Nesbitt as Mrs. McNab
- Charles Hawtrey as Rupert McNab
- Iris March as Mary McNab
- Donald Gray as Jimmy Dale
- Marjorie Taylor as Celia Canford
- Edward Wild as Peter Dill
- Hugh McDermott as Sevier
- Torin Thatcher as George Canford
- Gordon Bailey
- Ann Campbell
- MacArthur Gordon
- Gerald Pring
- Wensley Russell
- Fred Schwartz
- Paul Sheridan as Leroux
- Douglas Stewart
- Ben Wright

== Production ==
The film was made at the Cricklewood Studios in London, with art direction by Duncan Sutherland.

== Reception ==
The Monthly Film Bulletin wrote: "This plot has the makings of a good film, but the characters and dialogue are patchy. Will Fyfle has to take all the opportunities which the situations give, without much help from the rest of the cast, some of whom are exceedingly weak. Fortunately he is equal to playing a lone hand and always keeps the audience well amused, though he never succeeds in looking his part of a henpecked drudge. Setting and photography are good."

The Daily Film Renter wrote: "Story of henpecked suburban bank clerk's transformation into dominating 'he-man ' following clash with quartet of crooks. Initial passages in minor key, but development quickens midway, worm's turning affording delightful fun at expense of nagging wife, shiftless son, and bullying boss. Will Fyffe is whole show, concluding diverting performance with characteristic ballad. Agreeably staged, pleasant light entertainment for masses and star fans."

Picturegoer wrote: "Will Fyffe is, of course, the mainspring of the picture, and he gives a worth-while character sketch. As his wife Cathleen Nesbitt 'nags' effectively, and Charles Hawtrey is amusing as her son, Rupert. The plot is unduly spun out, but it is quite nicely directed and developed."

Picture Show wrote: "Will Fyffe is in good form in this mixture of comedy and melodrama. ... The supporting cast give effective performances and it is well set and directed."
