= Neutral Port =

1940 film

- Directed by: Marcel Varnel
- Written by: T.J. Morrison; J.B. Williams
- Produced by: Edward Black
- Starring: Will Fyffe; Leslie Banks; Yyvonne Arnaud; Phyllis Calvert
- Cinematography: Arthur Crabtree; Jack E. Cox
- Music by: Louis Levy
- Production companies: Gaumont-British Picture Corporation; Gainsborough Pictures
- Distributed by: General Film Distributors
- Release date: 6 December 1940
- Running time: 89 minutes
- Country: United Kingdom
- Language: English

Neutral Port (also known as The Net) is a 1940 British war comedy film directed by Marcel Varnel and starring Will Fyffe, Leslie Banks, Yvonne Arnaud, and Phyllis Calvert. It was written by T.J. Morrison and J.B. Williams and produced and distributed by Gainsborough Pictures. It was one of several films Fyffe made for Gainsborough.

== Plot ==
A British merchant ship is torpedoed by a German U-boat and takes shelter in a neutral port. The captain then strikes back at the German enemy.

== Cast ==
- Will Fyffe as Captain Ferguson
- Leslie Banks as George Carter
- Yvonne Arnaud as Rosa Pirenti
- Phyllis Calvert as Helen Carter
- Hugh McDermott as Jim Grey
- John Salew as Wilson
- Cameron Hall as Charlie Baxter
- Frederick Valk as Captain Traumer
- Anthony Holles as Chief of Police
- Sigurd Lohde as German Consul
- Wally Patch as Fred
- Dennis Wyndham as Terry
- Jack Raine as Alf
- Albert Lieven as Capt. Grosskraft
- Mignon O'Doherty as Miss Fleming
- Anton Diffring as sailor

== Production ==
The film was shot at the Gainsborough's Lime Grove Studios in West London. The film's sets were designed by the art director Alex Vetchinsky.

== Reception ==
The Monthly Film Bulletin wrote: "Will Fyffe as Captain Ferguson puts over a few gags in his forthright style, but on the whole this film, whether considered as propaganda or as entertainment, is disappointing. The root of its weakness lies in the extent to which it is entirely divorced from reality. Its link with the present war is purely arbitrary. There were perhaps reasons why the neutral port should have been given the fictional name of Esperanto, but unfortunately the setting and the characters are all of the musical comedy kind which such a name exactly suggests, and there is the most trivial kind of penny blood adventure story to match."

Kine Weekly wrote: "Lively story momentum is established and maintained. A spirited super-imposed love interest, a great performance by Will Fyffe, appropriate and topical last-minute spectacular, and a marvellous title seal the obvious box-office project. Excellent general booking."

Picturegoer wrote: "The star acts well and is one of the picture's mainstays, but generally it is all rather ingenuous and suffers from a repetition of the central idea. ... There are a number of spectacular sea sequences, but the entertainment relies mainly on the efforts of Will Fyffe."

Picture Show wrote: "Stimulating, breezy, topical, this comedy melodrama of the sea is a real tonic. ...Will Fyfle is a joy as the pugnacious old skipper, and Yvonne Arnaud delightful as Rosa. The excellent supporting cast is headed by Leslie Banks as the Consul whom the skipper constantly embarrasses."
