= Patrick Connor (actor) =

British actor (1926–2008)

- Born: 6 August 1926; Margate, Kent, England
- Died: 22 July 2008 (aged 81); England
- Occupation: Actor
- Spouse: Joyce Marlow (m. 1955)
- Children: 2

Patrick Connor (6 August 1926 – 22 July 2008) was a British actor. His stage work included the original West End production of Alfie in 1963. He was married to the actress and writer Joyce Marlow.

== Filmography ==
Year	Title	Role	Notes
1955	John and Julie	Trooper Rogers	
1955	A Yank in Ermine	Orderly	
1956	Supersonic Saucer	Number Twenty-Nine	
1957	Kill Her Gently	Det. Sgt. Thompson	
1958	I Was Monty's Double	Soldier in Tent	Uncredited
1959	The Headless Ghost	Constable	
1961	The Queen's Guards	Brewer	
1962	Death Trap		
1968	The Strange Affair	Sgt. Mac	
1975	Flame	Harold - Charlie's Boss	
1981	Eye of the Needle	Inspector Harris	
1981	Ragtime	Waldo's Aide No. 3	
1984	Laughterhouse	Policeman	
1985	Brazil	Cell Guard	
1985	Lifeforce	Fatherly Guard	
