= A Touch of the Sun (play) =

1958 play by N. C. Hunter

- Written by: N.C. Hunter
- Original language: English
- Genre: Drama

Premiere
- Date premiered: 6 January 1958
- Place premiered: Grand Theatre, Blackpool

A Touch of the Sun is a 1958 play by the British writer N.C. Hunter

It premiered at the Grand Theatre in Blackpool before moving to the West End, initially at the Saville Theatre before transferring to the Princes Theatre. Its original run lasted for 202 performances between 31 January and 26 July 1958. The cast included Michael Redgrave, Diana Wynyard, Vanessa Redgrave and Ronald Squire Michael Redgrave won the Best Actor award at the Evening Standard Theatre Awards.

== Bibliography ==
- Wearing, J.P. The London Stage 1950-1959: A Calendar of Productions, Performers, and Personnel. Rowman & Littlefield, 2014.
