= What Work Is =

1991 poetry book by Philip Levine

- Cover of US paperback edition
- Author: Philip Levine
- Language: English
- Genre: Poetry
- Publisher: Alfred A. Knopf
- Publication date: 1991
- Publication place: United States
- Media type: Print (hardcover & paperback)
- Pages: 77 pp (first edition, hardcover)
- ISBN: 0-679-40166-0

What Work Is is a collection of poetry by Philip Levine that explores subjects characteristic of his work, including physical labor, class identity, family relationships, and personal loss. Much of the book is shaped by concerns for blue collar workers as well as national political events. The focus on work and the working class has led to the collection being read through the lens of Marxist literary criticism.

What Work Is was first published in 1991 by Alfred A. Knopf, Inc. in New York. This poetry collection won the National Book Award for Poetry in 1991.

"I believed even then that if I could transform my experience into poetry I would give it the value and dignity it did not begin to possess on its own. I thought too that if I could write about it I could come to understand it; I believed that if I could understand my life—or at least the part my work played in it—I could embrace it with some degree of joy, an element conspicuously missing from my life."

— Philip Levine

== Themes ==
Major themes in the collection focus on the American working class. Many characters are vivid representations of American workers employed in blue-collar jobs. Settings include plumbing and plating factories, brass factories, automobile manufacturing plants, as well as neighborhoods in Detroit. The poetry finds its power as Levine reveals the inner lives of his characters, mostly blue-collar workers, but also artists, readers, and academics. According to Daniel Gyillory, Levine's poetry is accessible and moving and utterly American.

The poems in What Work Is are subtle in their thematic construction. Levine avoids creating caricatures, instead presenting real blue-collar workers, representing a station of life not commonly the subject of contemporary American poetry. This helps place the collection within the tradition of working class poetry. The poems feature different types of work, some of which reflect the actual work experience of the author. For instance, the poems "Fear and Fame" and "Growth" are direct accounts of two of Levine's jobs as a young man. "Fear and Fame" is based on a job Levine had cleaning out and refilling acid vats in his mid twenties. "Growth" is about the job Levine held at a soap factory at the age of fourteen. Many of Levine's poems are based on his experience growing up in Detroit. The title poem, "What Work Is", is based, for example, on Levine's experience waiting in a Detroit employment line. "The Right Cross" is related to a boxing teacher who taught Levine to defend himself while growing up in Detroit.

Besides work, love is a major theme of the book. For instance, "What Work Is," written for his brother, addresses not only issues of work but also the difficulty of expressing love. Often the theme of love is introduced in an understated way, secondary to the dominant theme of work.

== Style ==
The cadences of many poems in the collection are simple free verse. The rhythm and dictation of much of the collection is normal and easily accessible. Though "What Work Is" takes on many sophisticated subjects such as death, love, loss, and struggle, the collection maintains an easy-to-access feeling. Levine's work in this collection is not to obscure or make grandiose, but instead to reveal and show plainly matters that are important. Levine's structures and word choices reflect this mood of his poetry as he rarely uses complicated punctuation or rhythms. Instead of using highly symbolic words or imagery "What Work Is" tends to contain direct images and a more direct and perceptible intention. This use of strong and stable syntax allows one to perceive the people and places in the collection without getting caught up in the construction of the poems. Levine's intention is more of a narrative one, for the reader to get caught up in the images of the poem rather than the words.

== Analysis ==
Much of the work done on Levine's poetry is Marxist literary criticism. Because the subject matter and Levine's focus on work, Marxist criticism seems to be the most fitting. Rumiano proposes a Marxist reading of much of Levine's work in a dissertation. Rumiano analyzes many of Levine's poems and work in a Marxist manner as it relates to the working class characters that appear in Levine's poetry. Most notable are the concerns with the power struggles of the working class, working conditions, and how a life as a worker relates to a politics of living.

=== "What Work Is" ===
According to Ruo, in this poem Levine defines and expresses the struggles between the working class and the upper middle class. Two different aspects of the poem support and define this struggle. Firstly the narrator's brother is at home recovering after a hard night of labor. This means that the brother can not find time to practice singing opera which is what he most wants to do. If he were a member of the upper class he would not have to expend himself at the cost of his education just to survive. It can be seen as one way the working-class upper-class struggle is defined. Secondly the narrator, who waits in line to see if he can get a job that day, is at the mercy of the upper-class manager who decides who can work or not. This represents the struggle between the two classes as well as the balance of power between the two.

Contemporary critics often label Levine a working class poet, describing his writing as working class verse. Levine's poetry illustrates one of the most basic tenets of Marxist theory: that class antagonisms comprise all of human history.

=== "Growth" ===
This poem is about a job Levine had when he was a boy. The poem's narrator takes a retrospective look at his job at the soap factory. Rumiano states that the main issues and concerns in this poem are: the lack of communication, lack of a superior, and the hellish nature of the task that the narrator is performing and its effect upon him.

== Critical reception ==
Much of the collection contains a series of grim and brooding passages. Paul Gray, a contributor of "Time" called Levine's narrators “guerrillas, trapped in an endless battle long after the war is lost.” This may refer to instances where Levine recalls his childhood hometown of Detroit. Yet others, such as Marie Borroff, suggest that Levine's work is joyful despite its painful material.

Initial reviews for What Work Is praised Levine for his working-class subject matter, which represented a marked change from contemporary poets who wrote more about the domestic sphere. Levine's 1991 collection made an important digression from a trend of "meditation about a seemingly inconsequential comer of one's personal life" to the earnestness of work: "unglamorous, bluecollar, industrial, assembly-line work". Richard Hugo stated in the American Poetry Review that “Levine’s poems are important because in them we hear and we care.” Hugo shares a similar opinion as other critics of Levine's work; it is edgy, gritty, and brutal but also beautiful and hopeful.

Levine once referred to himself as “a dirty Detroit Jew with bad manners", and he has sometimes been criticized for leaning too hard on his blue-collar bona fides. The critic Adam Kirsch, writing in The Times Book Review in 1999, noted, accurately enough, that “in his autobiographical essays he goes out of his way to tell us that he is essentially a peasant.”

David Baker, writing about What Work Is (1991) in the Kenyon Review, said Levine has “one of our most resonant voices of social conviction and witness, and he speaks with a powerful clarity…What Work Is may be one of the most important books of poetry of our time. Poem after poem confronts the terribly damaged conditions of American labor, whose circumstance has perhaps never been more wrecked.”

After Levine was named Poet Laureate, What Work Is reached the top of Amazon.com's "Movers and Shakers" list.

== Contents ==
=== I ===
- "Fear and Fame"
- "Coming Close"
- "Fire"
- "Every Blessed Day"
- "Growth"
- "Innocence"
- "Coming Home from the Post Office"
- "Among Children"
- "What Work Is"

=== II ===
- "Snails"
- "My Grave"
- "Agnus Dei"
- "Facts"
- "Gin"
- "Perennials"
- "Above the World"
- "M.Degas Teaches Art & Science at Durfee Intermediate School"

=== III ===
- "Burned"

=== IV ===
- "Soloing"
- "Scouting"
- "Coming of Age in Michigan"
- "The Right Cross"
- "The Sweetness of Bobby Hefka"
- "On the River"
- "The Seventh Summer"
