= Don't Ever Leave Me (film) =

1949 British film by Arthur Crabtree

- Original poster
- Directed by: Arthur Crabtree
- Written by: Robert Westerby
- Based on: the story "Wise Guy" by Anthony Armstrong
- Produced by: Betty Box
- Starring: Petula Clark; Jimmy Hanley; Hugh Sinclair
- Cinematography: Stephen Dade
- Edited by: A. Charles Knott
- Music by: Lambert Williamson
- Production company: Gainsborough Pictures
- Distributed by: General Film Distributors
- Release date: 19 July 1949
- Running time: 85 minutes
- Country: United Kingdom
- Language: English

Don't Ever Leave Me is a 1949 British comedy film directed by Arthur Crabtree and starring Petula Clark, Jimmy Hanley, Hugh Sinclair, Edward Rigby, and Anthony Newley. It was written by Robert Westerby based on the story "Wise Guy" by Anthony Armstrong, and produced by Betty Box for Gainsborough Pictures.

== Plot ==
The plot revolves around Sheila Farlaine, the teenaged daughter of Shakespearean tragedian Michael Farlaine, who is kidnapped by elderly crook Harry Denton when it's suggested he no longer has what it takes to be a master criminal.

When Harry starts having second thoughts about the caper, Sheila – tired of playing second fiddle to her egotistical father's career – becomes the mastermind of the plot and resists every effort made by Harry's grandson Jack to return her home before things get serious. However, in this strange scenario Sheila wants to be kidnapped, as it gives her the opportunity to act grown up and she thinks her father will at last take some interest. He meanwhile embraces the role of worried parent for whom "the show must go on" and thrives on the newspaper publicity. Sheila begins to take a romantic interest in Jack, and despite her only being 15 (and three-quarters), she blackmails him into taking her out to clubs and casinos, wining, dining and dancing. Jack's girlfriend is less than happy when she discovers this.

Then Sheila's friend Jimmy decides that he too wants to be "kidnapped" and becomes a general nuisance to one and all.

== Cast ==
- Jimmy Hanley as Jack Denton
- Petula Clark as Sheila Farlaine
- Linden Travers as Mary Lamont
- Hugh Sinclair as Michael Farlaine
- Edward Rigby as Harry Denton
- Anthony Newley as Jimmy Knowles
- Barbara Murray as Joan Robbins
- Brenda Bruce as Miss Smith
- Maurice Denham as Mr. Knowles
- Frederick Piper as Max Marshall
- Sandra Dorne as Ruby Baines
- Russell Waters as Mr. Robbins
- Anthony Steel as Harris
- Michael Balfour as Jim Kennedy
- James Hayter as Man with summons
- Dandy Nichols as Mrs. Marshall
- Cyril Chamberlain as news reporter
- Philip Stainton as Detective Inspector
- John Salew as Farlaine's manager
- Barbara Leake as Mrs. Brand
- Arthur Hambling as policeman at Jack's flat
- Martin Miller as Leon Stoltz
- Ben Williams as Superintendent in cells

== Production ==
Petula Clark sings "It's Not for the Want of Trying" (Jack Fishman, Peter Hart).

Anthony Steel has one of his earliest screen appearances.

== Reception ==
The Monthly Film Bulletin wrote: "The film is unpretentious, but fails to make a favourable impression. It lacks pace and the humour is heavy-handed. Except for Brenda Bruce as the actor's patient secretary, and a shrewd study in matinée-idol conceit by Hugh Sinclair, the acting is undistinguished, though Anthony Newley contributes a startling performance as a potential juvenile delinquent."

Kine Weekly wrote: "No cast could have done more with the colourless tale. ... The play has little wit, warmth or originality. It just drifts from one stock situation to another. Glossy technical presentation may possibly get it over with the unsophisticated, but its chances outside of family and provincial circles are, to put it mildly, problematic."

Picture Show wrote: "With more polish and sparkle this could have been a comedy gem, for the basic idea of a kidnapper being blackmailed by the kidnapped into keeping her in hiding, long after he is burning to return her, is original and offers all kinds of possibilities, but only the duller ones seem to have been chosen. Edward Rigby dominates the film with his ingratiating portrayal of the incorrigible old ne'-er-do-well who does the kidnapping, with Jimmy Hanley as his harassed grandson whose flat is used as the hiding-place, Hugh Sinclair outstanding as the girl's actor-father whose interest in himself and indifference to her makes her decide to stay kidnapped, and Petula Clark attractive but a little amateurish as the daughter."

Variety wrote: "There is very little to be chalked up on the credit side of this new British production, which has a flimsy plot, weak script and no stars. In fact, it is just another case of a 'B' picture being moved up to top grade to satisfy quota demands. Making no pretence at credibility the story describes the adventures of the teenage daughter of an actor who becomes a willing accomplice in a kidnapping plot. Situations developing are in an uneven and mainly farcical key and the humor keeps to a steady low level. Cast tries valiantly to put over the material at their disposal."
