= The Wedding of Lilli Marlene =

1953 film by Arthur Crabtree

- Trade ad from The Daily Film Renter, 1953
- Directed by: Arthur Crabtree
- Screenplay by: John Baines
- Produced by: William J. Gell
- Starring: Lisa Daniely; Hugh McDermott; Sid James
- Cinematography: Arthur Grant
- Edited by: Douglas Myers
- Music by: Eric Rogers
- Production company: Monarch Productions
- Distributed by: Monarch Film Corporation
- Release date: 29 November 1953
- Running time: 87 minutes
- Country: United Kingdom
- Language: English

The Wedding of Lilli Marlene is a 1953 British drama film directed by Arthur Crabtree and starring Lisa Daniely, Hugh McDermott and Sid James. It was written by John Baines and was a sequel to the 1950 film Lilli Marlene, also directed by Crabtree.

== Premise ==
After the end of the Second World War, Lilli Marlene and American reporter Steve Moray plan to marry, but when Lilli gets a chance for a big break on the London stage, it throws their plans into disarray.

== Cast ==
- Lisa Daniely as Lilli Marlene
- Hugh McDermott as Steve Moray, Lilli's fiancé
- Sid James as Finnimore Hunt
- Gabrielle Brune as Maggie Lennox
- Jack Billings as Hal Marvel
- Robert Ayres as Andrew Jackson
- Joan Heal as Linda
- John Blythe as Holt
- Mairhi Russell as Mrs. Smith
- Irene Handl as Rosie, the Eastern European dresser
- Wally Patch as Wally
- Dandy Nichols as Mrs. Harris
- Ann Bennett as Forbes
- Ben Williams as Ted
- Tom Gill as Willy
- Jacques Cey as Vittorio
- Ernst Ulman as Salmon
- Jacqueline Mackenzie as theatre barmaid
- Charmian Buchel as Becky
- George Roderick as theatrical agent
- Stanley Baker as audience member

== Production ==
It was made at Southall Studios with sets designed by the art director Ray Simm.

== Critical reception ==
The Monthly Film Bulletin wrote: "Although Lisa Daniely has a pleasant voice, the ineffective musical numbers do not help to enliven this tedious picture of show business in London."

Leslie Halliwell said: "Poorly confected programme filler, an unnecessary sequel if ever there was one."

In British Sound Films: The Studio Years 1928–1959 David Quinlan rated the film as "poor", writing: "Long, stiff and tedious."
