= Grouse in June =

1939 comedy play by N. C. Hunter

- Written by: N.C. Hunter
- Original language: English
- Genre: Comedy

Premiere
- Date premiered: 24 April 1939
- Place premiered: Richmond Theatre, London

Grouse in June is a 1939 comedy play by N.C. Hunter, in which a group of Americans hunt for treasure lost on the Scottish coast when the Spanish Armada was washed ashore in 1588.

After premiering at Richmond Theatre, it ran for 126 performances in the West End at the Criterion and New Theatres. The cast included Robert Beatty, Arthur Hambling and Hugh McDermott.

== Bibliography ==
- Wearing, J.P. The London Stage 1930-1939: A Calendar of Productions, Performers, and Personnel. Rowman & Littlefield, 2014.
