= Ronald Hayman =

British writer (1932–2019)

- Born: 4 May 1932; Bournemouth, England
- Died: 20 January 2019 (aged 86)
- Occupations: Dramatist; biographer; critic; writer; director

Higham Ronald Hayman (4 May 1932 – 20 January 2019) was a British critic, dramatist, writer, and stage director who was best known as a biographer.

== Biography ==
=== Early life ===
Ronald Hayman was born on May 4, 1932, in East Cliff Hotel in Bournemouth, England, a Jewish hotel which had been founded by his grandmother, Anne Morris. His mother, Sadie, was an administrator at the hotel while his father, John, was in a partnership running an antiques and jewellery business. He was educated at St Paul's School in London and at Trinity Hall, Cambridge, where he earned a B.A. in 1954, promoted to M.A. in 1963. He served in the Royal Air Force for a one-year duty, from 1950 to 1951.

After reading English at Cambridge in 1954, Hayman lived in Germany for two years, mainly to write. He became involved in professional theatre after playing the lead in Love's Labour's Lost with English amateurs in Berlin. He then attended drama school and acted for three years in rep and on television.

=== Writing career ===
His first play, The End of an Uncle, was staged at Wimbledon in 1959. He made his debut as a director with Jean Genet's Deathwatch at the Arts Theatre in 1960 and in 1961 was awarded an ABC Television traineeship, which took him to Northampton for a year as assistant producer. He also directed Bertolt Brecht's In the Jungle of Cities and a stage adaptation of Robin Maugham's The Servant. Hayman directed at Theatre Royal Stratford East, Farnham, the Edinburgh Festival, Yvonne Arnaud Theatre, and Guildford, and for Open Space. His one-man show with Max Adrian as George Bernard Shaw transferred to the West End and went on a world tour.

He was a regular contributor to the Arts page of The Times and to the New Review. He broadcast on arts programmes and lectured for the University of London Department of English Literature. In the 1970s, he lectured on Shakespeare and the traditions of English acting for the Tufts University of London program.

Between May and June 1972, Hayman directed Patricia Welles’s comedy “The Lottery” at the Hampstead Theatre Club.

Hayman’s play Playing the Wife (1995) is based on August Strindberg's second marriage to the Austrian Frida Uhl.

== Works ==
- John Arden (1968)
- John Osborne (1968)
- Techniques of Acting (1969)
- Robert Bolt (1969)
- Arnold Wesker (1970)
- Harold Pinter (1970)
- Samuel Beckett (1970)
- John Whiting (1970)
- Tolstoy (1970)
- John Gielgud (1971)
- Edward Albee (1971)
- Arguing with Walt Whitman: An Essay on His Influence on Twentieth-Century American Verse (1971)
- Arthur Miller (1972)
- Playback (1973)
- The Set-up: An Anatomy of the English Theatre Today (1973)
- Playback II (1973)
- The First Thrust: the Chichester Festival Theatre (1975)
- Leavis (1976)
- Eugène Ionesco (1976)
- The Novel Today, 1967-1975 (1976)
- Tom Stoppard (1977)
- How to Read a Play (1977)
- Artaud and After (1977)
- De Sade: A Critical Biography (1978)
- British Theatre since 1955: A Reassessment (1979)
- Theatre and Anti-Theatre: New Movements Since Beckett (1979)
- Nietzsche: A Critical Life (1980)
- Franz Kafka (1982)
- Brecht (1983)
- Bertolt Brecht: The Plays (1984)
- Fassbinder: Film Maker (1984)
- Gunter Grass (1985)
- Secrets: Boyhood in a Jewish Hotel, 1932-1954 (1985)
- Writing Against: A Biography of Sartre (1986)
- My Cambridge (1986) editor
- Sartre: A Life (1987)
- Proust: A Biography (1990)
- The Death and Life of Sylvia Plath (1992)
- Tennessee Williams: Everyone Else is an Audience (1993)
- Thomas Mann (1995)
- Nietzsche (1997)
- Hitler and Geli (1998)
- A Life of Jung (2001)
- Marquis De Sade: The Genius of Passion (2003)
