= William Abney (actor) =

English actor (1921–1997)

- Photo: Mark Gudgeon, 1967
- Born: 7 January 1921; Upminster, Essex, England
- Died: 9 August 1997 (aged 76); London, England
- Occupations: Actor; writer

William Edward Charles Wootton Abney (7 January 1921 – 9 August 1997) played Reverend Copley on Coronation Street in 1977, and Jim Lorimer in 1980. His other television credits include Object Z, The Adventures of William Tell, Crossroads, Special Branch, Play for Today, All Creatures Great and Small, Robin's Nest and The Return of Sherlock Holmes.

The son of Henry Charles Wootton Abney, of the landed gentry family of Abney of Measham Hall, Derbyshire, by his wife, Janet Bentley Littlejohn, Abney was educated at Cranleigh School and the Central School of Speech and Drama.

His stage work included West End roles in the original production of Carrington V.C. in 1953, and (as Giles Ralston) in Agatha Christie's The Mousetrap in 1956-1959.

As a film actor, Abney appeared in Horrors of the Black Museum (1959), Never Take Sweets from a Stranger (1960), Two-Way Stretch, (1960), Cone of Silence (1960), The City of the Dead (1960), Hitler: The Last Ten Days (1973), The Legacy (1979), North Sea Hijack (1980) and Curse of the Pink Panther (1983).

As a writer, Abney wrote the story for "Poor Butterfly" (1969), an episode of Journey to the Unknown (TV series).

== Filmography ==
Year	Title	Role	Notes	Ref.
1951	Sunday Night Theatre	Multiple roles		
1953	Martim Lutero			
1957	The Steel Bayonet	Artillery Officer		
1959	Horrors of the Black Museum	Patrol Constable #1		
1959	The Night We Dropped a Clanger	2nd German Sentry		
1960	Two-Way Stretch	Visiting Room Warder		
1960	Never Take Sweets from a Stranger	1st Policeman		
1960	Cone of Silence	First Officer		
1960	The Man Who Was Nobody	James Tynewood		
1960	The City of the Dead	Policeman		
1961	Middle Course	Jaghorst		
1962	Flight from Singapore	Flight Lt. Bob Elliott		
1963	On the Run	Jock McKay	Edgar Wallace Mysteries	
1964	We Shall See	Shaw	Edgar Wallace Mysteries	
1973	Hitler: The Last Ten Days	Voss		
1978	The Legacy	Butler		
1979	North Sea Hijack	Gail		
1983	Curse of the Pink Panther	Hugo the Houseman		
