= The 39 Steps =

The Thirty-Nine Steps is a 1915 novel by John Buchan.

The 39 Steps may also refer to:

== Adaptations of the novel ==
- The 39 Steps (1935 film), directed by Alfred Hitchcock
- The 39 Steps (1959 film), directed by Ralph Thomas
- The Thirty Nine Steps (1978 film), directed by Don Sharp
- The 39 Steps (2008 film), directed by James Hawes
- The 39 Steps (play), a parody by Patrick Barlow
- The 39 Steps (video game), 2013

== Other uses ==
- 39 Steps (album), by guitarist John Abercrombie, 2013
- 39 Steps (Ariolasoft), an imprint of Ariolasoft, a video game publisher
