= Gerard Schurmann =

Dutch-born British composer and conductor (1924–2020)

- Born: 19 January 1924; Java, Dutch East Indies
- Died: 24 March 2020 (aged 96); Hollywood Hills, California, U.S.
- Occupations: Composer; conductor

Gerard Schurmann (19 January 1924 – 24 March 2020) was a Dutch-born British composer and conductor. He lived in the United States from 1981 until his death. He composed music for many film soundtracks. Schurmann was also the orchestrator for the 1962 film Lawrence of Arabia. Schurmann died on 24 March 2020 at his home in the Hollywood Hills.

== Early life ==
Gerard Schurmann was born to a Dutch father and a Hungarian pianist mother who had studied with Béla Bartók.

== Film music ==
- The Long Arm (1956)
- The Man in the Sky (1957)
- The Camp on Blood Island (1958)
- The Two Headed Spy (1958)
- Horrors of the Black Museum (1959)
- Cone of Silence (1960)
- Konga (1961)
- The Ceremony (1963)
- Dr Syn, Alias the Scarecrow (1963)
- The Bedford Incident (1965)
- The Lost Continent (1968)
- Attack on the Iron Coast (1968)
- Claretta (1984)
- The Gambler (1997)

== Discography ==
- Concerto for Orchestra, Violin Concerto
- Six Studies of Francis Bacon, Variants for Small Orchestra (1968)
- Music for Violin and Piano
- Chamber Music, Vol. 2
- Chamber Music, Vol. 3
- Chamber and Instrumental Music and Songs, Vol. 4
