= Leon Friedman (legal scholar) =

American legal scholar

- Born: February 6, 1933 (age 93)

Academic background
- Education: Harvard University (BA, LLB)

Academic work
- Institutions: Hofstra University

Leon Friedman (born February 6, 1933) is an American legal scholar and the Joseph Kushner Distinguished Professor of Civil Liberties Law at Hofstra University.

Friedman's publications include Southern Justice (1965), an edited collection examining the experiences of lawyers involved in the civil rights movement in the Southern United States; The Justices of the United States Supreme Court, 1789–1969: Their Lives and Major Opinions (1969), a four-volume reference work coedited with historian Fred L. Israel that received the 1970 Scribes Book Award; The Wise Minority: An Argument for Draft Resistance and Civil Disobedience (1970), examining the history and justification of civil disobedience and resistance to military conscription; Unquestioning Obedience to the President: The ACLU Case Against the Legality of the War in Vietnam (1972), coauthored with Burt Neuborne; and Disorder in the Court (1973), coauthored with Norman Dorsen, examining courtroom disruption and judicial administration, prepared for the Association of the Bar of the City of New York.
