= N. C. Hunter =

British playwright (1908–1971)

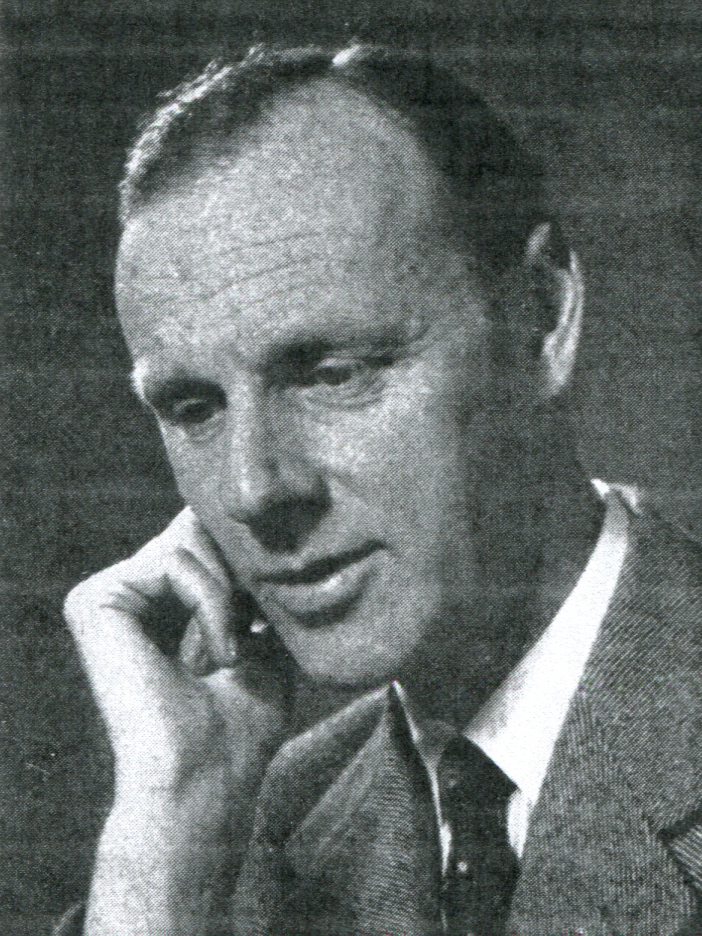
- N.C. Hunter from article "N C Hunter, The Elusive Playwright, by George Bullock" from Theatre World Magazine 1954
- Born: 18 September 1908; Derbyshire, England
- Died: 19 April 1971 (aged 62); London, England
- Occupation: Playwright

Norman Charles Hunter (18 September 1908 – 19 April 1971) was a British playwright whose plays attracted such notable actors to perform them as John Gielgud, Wendy Hiller, Sybil Thorndike, Ralph Richardson, Vanessa Redgrave, Michael Redgrave, and Ingrid Bergman. His play A Picture of Autumn was revived off-Broadway by the Mint Theater Company in 2013. Hunter's play A Day by the Sea was revived off-Broadway by the Mint Theater Company in 2016. It subsequently had its first major UK revival at London's Southwark Playhouse with John Sackville in the title role of Julian Anson.

== Stage plays ==
- All Rights Reserved (1935)
- Ladies and Gentlemen (1937)
- A party for Christmas (1938)
- Grouse in June (1939)
- Waters of the Moon (1951) which included in its cast Sybil Thorndike and Edith Evans. It ran for 835 performances. It was later produced in 1978 with Wendy Hiller and Ingrid Bergman in its cast.
- A Day by the Sea (1953) which included in its cast Ralph Richardson, Sybil Thorndike, and John Gielgud, with the latter directing. It ran for 386 performances.
- A Touch of the Sun (1958) which included Michael and Vanessa Redgrave in its cast. The play was sharply criticized by Kenneth Tynan for "the vacuity of the author's attitude towards life"
- The Tulip Tree (1962) which included Lynn Redgrave in its cast. Noël Coward called it "a charming play", adding that "...it got bad notices, but ... Hunter never gets good ones, neither does he ever write bad plays. I admire his quality and class."
