= Paper Orchid =

- Directed by: Roy Ward Baker
- Written by: Val Guest
- Based on: Paper Orchid by Arthur La Bern
- Produced by: John R. Sloan; William Collier Jr.
- Starring: Hugh Williams; Hy Hazell; Sid James; Garry Marsh
- Cinematography: Basil Emmott
- Edited by: Betty Orgar
- Music by: Robert Farnon
- Production company: Ganesh Productions
- Distributed by: Columbia Pictures
- Release date: 11 July 1949
- Running time: 86 minutes
- Country: United Kingdom
- Language: English

Paper Orchid is a 1949 British crime film directed by Roy Ward Baker and starring Hugh Williams, Hy Hazell, Sid James and Garry Marsh. It was written by Val Guest, based on the 1948 novel of the same title by Arthur La Bern. It was shot at the Walton Studios outside London.

== Plot ==
Despite feeling that women are unsuited to journalism, Fleet Street newspaper editor Frank McSweeney hires Stella Mason as a reporter at the Daily National. Stella starts a hugely popular gossip column, gaining the nickname 'Paper Orchid'.

When her husband dies, Lady Croup becomes the new proprietor of the Daily National. She fires Frank and another journalist, 'Johnny' Johnson – both of whom join rival newspaper the World Record. After offending Lady Croup, Stella also loses her job.

When Stella's tenant is murdered, circumstantial evidence builds up against her. She takes the story to Frank, hoping that the World Record will give her a job in return for the scoop. When he tries to force her to publish it under her own by-line she takes it to the Daily National, where its crime reporter Freddy Evans is asked to investigate it.

It emerges that Freddy actually committed the murder. He files his final newspaper report: a confession. After declaring his love for Stella, he kills himself at Charing Cross Station.

In the epilogue, Frank decides to publish Freddy's last story – pausing momentarily when he hears of his tormented colleague's death.

== Cast ==
- Hugh Williams as Frank McSweeney
- Hy Hazell as Stella Mason
- Sid James as Freddy Evans
- Garry Marsh as Johnson
- Andrew Cruickshank as Detective-Inspector Clement Pill
- Ivor Barnard as Eustace Crabb
- Walter Hudd as Briggs
- Ella Retford as Lady Croup
- Hughie Green as Harold Croup
- Vida Hope as Jonquil Jones
- Frederick Leister as Walter Wibberley
- Vernon Greeves as John Deane
- Patricia Owens as Mary MacSweeney
- Rolf Lefebvre as Peter Pasterman
- Brian Oulton as nightclub manager
- Andrew Sachs as office boy
- Ray Ellington as himself

== Reception ==
The Monthly Film Bulletin wrote: "Although the plot, with its straggling episodes and confusing, artificial Fleet Street politics, carries no conviction of any kind, the dialogue at least seems to have been written by someone with a knowledge of how people really speak, and the direction contrives to build up a certain impression that the film deserves to be taken seriously. The cast try hard, especially Hugh Williams, miscast as a tough editor. Sidney James, as the drunken reporter, is a new personality, but Hy Hazell, also new, has few, if any, original qualities."

Kine Weekly wrote: "Highly coloured newspaper comedy melodrama, tabulating the many adventures and misadventures of a 'sob sister' who learns to her cost that ink and not blood courses in the veins of 'scribes.' The start is a bit ragged and the climax is both vague and sensational, but the players never lose heart. The tireless and versatile teamwork, backed up by good technical qualities, provides robust and rollicking entertainment for the crowd."
