= Good-Time Girl =

- Directed by: David MacDonald
- Written by: Muriel Box; Sydney Box; Ted Willis
- Based on: Night Darkens the Street; 1947 novel by Arthur La Bern
- Produced by: Sydney Box
- Starring: Jean Kent; Dennis Price; Herbert Lom; Bonar Colleano
- Cinematography: Stephen Dade
- Edited by: Vladimir Sagovsky
- Music by: Lambert Williamson; Clifton Parker
- Production company: Triton Productions
- Distributed by: General Film Distributors; Eagle-Lion Classics; Victory Films
- Release date: 28 April 1948
- Running time: 81 minutes
- Country: United Kingdom
- Language: English
- Budget: £180,000
- Box office: £177,000 (by 1953)

Good-Time Girl is a 1948 British film noir-crime drama film directed by David MacDonald and starring Jean Kent, Dennis Price and Herbert Lom. A homeless girl is asked to explain her bad behaviour in the juvenile court, and says she's run away from home because she's unhappy there. They explain in detail what happened to the last girl who thought she could cope on her own, and this becomes the main plot.

== Plot ==
The film opens with Miss Thorpe, chairwoman of the Juvenile Court, giving advice to troubled teenager Lyla Lawrence. Miss Thorpe tells Lyla that her life has a similar beginning to that of Gwen Rawlings. She then recounts Gwen's story in a series of flashbacks.

Gwen is a 16-year-old girl who repeatedly falls in with the wrong crowd. Her troubles begin with her employer, a pawnbroker, who catches her "borrowing" a brooch from his shop. Although Gwen had only borrowed it to wear at a dance and had every intention of returning it, she is fired. When she arrives home and informs her father, he beats her. The next day Gwen packs her things and moves into a boarding house. There she meets Jimmy Rosso, a sharply-dressed man who immediately takes a liking to her good looks, telling her he could get her a job at the club where he works.

Jimmy tells her to go to the Blue Angel night club, where she meets his employer Max Vine, the boss. Having checked out her shapely legs he employs her as a hat-check girl. While working she meets "Red" Farrell, a member of the club's band, who feels the need to look after her well-being. Jimmy attempts to pursue Gwen but is rejected. He grows angry about the growing relationship between Red and Gwen and beats her. Max discovers what Jimmy has done and fires him. Angry at Gwen, who he feels has lost him his job, Jimmy plots to betray her. He steals their landlady's jewellery and tells Gwen to pawn it for him. Believing that the jewellery belonged to his mother, Gwen follows his instructions. Later, after learning that Max had been attacked by a gang, Gwen doesn't want to go back to her lodgings because of Jimmy. Neither does she want to go to her parents because of her father, so Red takes her back to his place. Red lets her have a bath and allows her a night's stay but insists that she leave the following day when they will search for new lodgings for her. When watching the movie, the name of the night club is articulated as being something similar sounding to Swan's Down, rather than Blue Angel.

However, the police soon find Gwen and she is sent to court where she is accused of having stolen jewellery. Believing Jimmy's lies and discounting Red's evidence that Gwen is innocent, Miss Thorpe, presiding over the hearing, decides to send her to an approved school for three years. The child welfare officer allows Red to see Gwen before she is taken and they steal a passionate kiss.

During a school fight Gwen runs away and finds Max, who has opened another club, in Brighton. Max is reluctant to take her back but as she's clearly desperate, he gives her a job. Gwen soon becomes close to Danny Martin, a regular at the club. One drunken night both are out for a drive when they accidentally hit and kill a police officer. Danny forbids anyone from speaking to the police. However, once Danny is questioned Gwen flees.

Danny later finds Gwen and beats her. Gwen is found and helped by two American soldiers who are AWOL. They decide to band together and become petty criminals in London. After becoming too well known in the city for their crimes, they decide to head to Manchester. As they flag down a car to steal, Gwen immediately recognises that the driver of the car is Red. When her companions see the two know each other, they shoot Red dead. All three are eventually caught and tried for their crimes, and Gwen is sentenced to serve fifteen years in prison.

At the end of the film, a chastened Lyla thanks Miss Thorpe and decides to head home.

== Cast ==
- Jean Kent as Gwen Rawlings
- Dennis Price as Michael 'Red' Farrell
- Flora Robson as Miss Thorpe
- Griffith Jones as Danny Martin
- Herbert Lom as Max Vine
- Bonar Colleano as Micky Malone
- Hugh McDermott as Al Schwartz
- Peter Glenville as Jimmy Rosso
- Nora Swinburne as Miss Mills
- Elwyn Brook-Jones as Mr. Pottinger
- Jill Balcon as Roberta King
- Beatrice Varley as Mrs. Rawlings
- Margaret Barton as Agnes
- Diana Dors as Lyla Lawrence
- Garry Marsh as Mr. Hawkins
- Harry Ross as Fruity Lee
- Orlando Martins as Kolly
- Amy Veness as Mrs. Chalk
- Jack Raine as Detective Inspector Girton
- Michael Hordern as Seddon
- Renee Gadd as Mrs. Parsons
- George Carney as Mr. Rawlings
- George Merritt as Police Sergeant
- Joan Young as Mrs. Bond
- Dorothy Vernon as Mrs. Chudd
- Vera Frances as Edie Rawlings
- June Byford as Joan Rawlings
- John Blythe as Art Moody
- Edward Lexy as Mr. Morgan
- Phyl French as Sonia
- Danny Green as Smiling Billy
- Noel Howlett as Clerk
- Mollie Palmer as Reform school girl
- Zena Marshall as Annie Farrell
- Ilena Sylva as Ida
- Betty Nelson as Connie
- Rosalind Atkinson as Doctor
- Iris Vandeleur as Lodger
- Jane Hylton as Doris
- Lionel Grose as Silver Slipper doorman
- Arthur Hambling as Policeman At Park Gates
- Tommy Duggan as MP
- Jim O'Brady as Max's attacker
- Wally Patch as Bookie
- Phyllis Stanley as Ida

== Production ==
The film was originally known as Bad Girl. It was based on Arthur La Bern's 1947 novel Night Darkens the Street. It was shot at Islington Studios and on location around London. The film's sets were designed by the art directors Maurice Carter and George Provis.

== Release ==
The film was originally banned by the British censor for its dialogue.

Trade papers called the film a "notable box office attraction" in British cinemas in 1948.

== Critical reception ==
The New York Times concluded that "even the commendable acting in Good Time Girl does not bring it out of the minor melodrama class"; whereas The Monthly Film Bulletin found the film "Tensely gripping in its seamiest situations, it holds the interest to the end and makes the heart beat faster...Apart from perfect direction, fine photography, and good acting, the story makes one think and argue"; and in The Spectator, Virginia Graham wrote "Good Time Girl makes a shot at dealing seriously and honestly with the problem of juvenile delinquency, and it does not fall too short of the mark."

Financially, the film was not a great success with box office takings (£177,000 at 1953) slightly under its production costs of £180,000.

== See also ==
- Cautionary tale
