= Brighton Belle (La Bern novel) =

1963 novel

- Author: Arthur La Bern
- Language: English
- Genre: Crime
- Publisher: William Allen
- Publication date: 1963
- Publication place: United Kingdom
- Media type: Print

Brighton Belle is a 1963 crime novel by the British writer Arthur La Bern. The author had made his name with his 1945 debut It Always Rains on Sunday and had followed it up with several other bestsellers. Brighton Belle portrays the same low-life milieu as the earlier works, but with the setting shifted from London in the 1940s to the south coast resort of Brighton in the early 1960s.

It was in a tradition of other earlier novels using Brighton as a seedy setting including Graham Greene's Brighton Rock and Patrick Hamilton's The West Pier.

== Bibliography ==
- Reilly, John M. Twentieth Century Crime & Mystery Writers. Springer, 2015.
- The London Mystery Selection, Issues 56-59. N. Kark Publications., 1963.
