= John Carson (actor) =

English actor (1927–2016)

- Born: John Derek Carson-Parker; 28 February 1927; Colombo, Ceylon (present-day Sri Lanka)
- Died: 5 November 2016 (aged 89); Cape Town, South Africa
- Occupation: Actor
- Years active: 1946–2008
- Spouse: Pamela Greer (m. 1974)
- Children: 6

John Derek Carson-Parker (28 February 1927 – 5 November 2016), known as John Carson, was an English actor known for his appearances in film and television.

== Early life and education ==
Born to English parents in Colombo, Ceylon (now Sri Lanka), where his father worked on tea and rubber plantations, he was educated in Australia and went to Britain to do national service as an artillery officer in an anti-aircraft regiment between 1944 and 1945. He then studied law at Queen's College, Oxford before leaving for New Zealand, where he worked in amateur theatre before returning to Britain to begin his professional career. His stage appearances included the original productions of A Man For All Seasons and A Day in the Death of Joe Egg.

== Career ==
Making his film debut in 1947, Carson carved out a career appearing in low-budget British films such as Seven Keys (1961), Smokescreen (1964), and Master Spy (1964). His saturnine looks and sinister voice (sometimes compared with James Mason) led to him starring in a number of horror films including The Night Caller (1965), The Plague of the Zombies (1966), The Man Who Haunted Himself (1970), Taste the Blood of Dracula (1970), and Captain Kronos – Vampire Hunter (1972).

Beside his appearances in horror films he was also known for his many villainous turns in adventure series of the 1960s, such as The Adventures of Robin Hood, The Avengers, The Saint, Adam Adamant Lives!, The Baron, Man in a Suitcase, The Champions and Department S.

His long and varied list of television credits include Emergency - Ward 10, Ivanhoe, William Tell, Armchair Theatre, Maigret, Out of the Unknown, Emma (as Mr. Knightley), Dixon of Dock Green, Crown Court, The New Avengers, Telford's Change, Secret Army, Special Branch, The Professionals, Tales of the Unexpected, Hammer House of Horror, Doctor Who (Snakedance), Shaka Zulu and Poirot. He was also the voice-over performer in Sunsilk TV commercials.

He joined the BBC oil industry drama The Troubleshooters in its final series as new deputy chairman James Langley. A spin-off starring his character was considered, but never made it to production.

== Personal life ==
Carson moved with his family to South Africa in 1983 and continued to work in film and television. He died at his home in Cape Town on 5 November 2016 at the age of 89. Married twice, he was survived by his second wife, actress and writer Pamela Greer, who is best known for her roles on television during the 1960s. In 1966, she had changed her forename from Luanshya to Pamela, and become a writer for TV shows including Dixon of Dock Green, Thriller and Triangle. Carson was also survived by his six children, four from his first marriage, Richard, Chris, Katie and Harry, and two from his second marriage, Ben and Suzanna.

== Selected filmography ==
=== Film ===
- Conspiracy in Teheran (1946)
- Quentin Durward (1955) - Duke of Orléans
- Ramsbottom Rides Again (1956) - (uncredited)
- Intent to Kill (1958) - Hospital Receptionist
- The Lady Is a Square (1959) - Reporter (uncredited)
- Identity Unknown (1960 film) (1960) - Ray (uncredited)
- Seven Keys (1961) - Norman
- Guns of Darkness (1962) - First Officer
- Edgar Wallace Mysteries, Locker Sixty-Nine (1962) - Miguel Terila
- The Set Up (1963) - Insp. Jackson
- Master Spy (1963) - Richard Colman
- Accidental Death (1963) - Paul Lanson
- Smokescreen (1964) - Trevor Bayliss
- Edgar Wallace Mysteries, Act of Murder (1964) - Tim Ford
- The Night Caller (1965) - Major
- The Plague of the Zombies (1966) - Squire Clive Hamilton
- Thunderbird 6 (1968) - Captain Foster (II) (voice)
- Taste the Blood of Dracula (1970) - Jonathon Secker
- The Man Who Haunted Himself (1970) - Ashton
- Male Bait (1971)
- Captain Kronos – Vampire Hunter (1974) - Dr. Marcus
- Skating on Thin Uys (1985) - BBC Man
- Survivor (1987) - Engineer Councillor
- Tenth of a Second (1987) - Man from Organization
- City of Blood (1987) - Prime Minister
- An African Dream (1987) - Harry Endicott
- Diamonds High (1988) - Heinrich
- The Last Warrior (1989) - Priest
- Schweitzer (1990) - Horton Herschel
- The Sheltering Desert (1991) - Harding
- The Last Hero (1991) - Fred Zimmerman
- My Daughter's Keeper (1991) - Bernard Eton
- Woman of Desire (1994) - Judge Parker
- Mandela and de Klerk (1997, TV Movie) - Willem de Klerk
- Operation Delta Force 3: Clear Target (1998) - President Farrington
- I Dreamed of Africa (2000) - Pembroke Headmaster
- The Deal (2008) - Nigel Bland
- Doomsday (2008) - George Dutton

=== TV ===
- Story Parade - The Caves of Steel (1964) - R. Daneel Olivaw
- Crown Court
- Ivanhoe (1958-1959) - Sir Robert / Sir Roderick / Sir Morten / Guard Captain
- Armchair Theatre (1958-1959) - Aengus MacOgue / Tom Brook / Borghem
- Emergency Ward 10 (1959) - Donald Latimer
- The Adventures of William Tell (1959) - Fritz
- Oliver Twist (1962) - Monks
- Maigret (1963) - Richard Gendreau-Balthazar
- The Avengers (1963-1965) - Fitch / Marten Halvarssen / Ariston
- Hereward the Wake (1965) - William the Conqueror
- Dombey and Son (1969)
- Out of the Unknown (1971) - Allen Meredith
- Paul Temple (TV series) (1971) - Dr. Stephen Banning (Episode: Catch Your Death)
- Emma (1972) - Mr. Knightley
- Dixon of Dock Green (1976) - Joe Conway / Francis Spurling
- The New Avengers (1976) - Freddy
- Secret Army (1977) - Hans Van Reijn
- Kidnapped (1978) - James More
- The Professionals (1978) - Brian Forrest
- Telford's Change (1979) - Jean Dieber
- Tales of the Unexpected (1980) - Arthur
- Hammer House of Horror (1980) - Charles Randolph
- Doctor Who (1983, Serial: Snakedance) - Ambril
- Strangers and Brothers (1984) - Jago
- Shaka Zulu (1986) - Lord Kimberley
- Poirot (1989-2005) - Richard Abernethie / Sir George Carrington
- Maigret (1997) - Docteur
