= The Verdict (1964 film) =

British mystery thriller by David Eady

- Directed by: David Eady
- Written by: Arthur La Bern
- Based on: Short story by Edgar Wallace
- Produced by: Jack Greenwood
- Starring: Cec Linder; Zena Marshall; Nigel Davenport
- Cinematography: James Wilson
- Edited by: Derek Holding
- Music by: Bernard Ebbinghouse
- Production company: Merton Park Studios
- Distributed by: Anglo-Amalgamated
- Release date: 1964
- Running time: 59 minutes
- Country: United Kingdom
- Language: English

The Verdict (also known as Big Four) is a 1964 British mystery thriller film directed by David Eady and starring Cec Linder, Zena Marshall and Nigel Davenport. It was written by Arthur La Bern. Part of the Edgar Wallace Mysteries film series made at Merton Park Studios, the film's sets were designed by the art director Peter Mullins.

== Cast ==
- Cec Linder as Joe Armstrong
- Zena Marshall as Carola
- Nigel Davenport as Larry Mason
- Paul Stassino as Danny Thorne
- Derek Francis as Supt. Brett
- John Bryans as Prendergast
- Derek Partridge as Peter
- John Glyn-Jones as Harry
- David Cargill as Johnny
- Derek Aylward as Phillip-Greene
- William Dysart as Det. Sgt. Good
- John Moore as house detective
- Kenneth Benda as Lord Chief Justice
- William Raynor as Clerk of the Court
- Denis Holmes as Mr. Matthews
- Dorinda Stevens as Molly
- Phyllis Rose as woman in night club
- Sidonie Bond as reporter
- John Murray Scott as reporter
- Peter Thomas as reporter
- Allan Warren as page boy

== Plot ==
Rich racketeer Joe Armstrong arrives in London after being deported from the United States. Superintendent Brett, investigating a murder committed 24 years previously, arrests Armstrong, who tells accomplice Larry Mason to rig his trial jury, but crime boss Danny Thorne wants some of Joe's money for himself.

== Reception ==
The Monthly Film Bulletin wrote: "This is a film without much originality but also without too many clichés or irrelevant scenes. As usual with the Edgar Wallace series, preoccupation with plot ramifications leads to paleness in the character drawing, and the actors never manage to create living, interesting persons out of their parts. Derek Francis and Cec Linder have their moments, however, and as a story told straightforwardly without surprises, it sustains the interest."
