= Paper Orchid (novel) =

1948 novel

- Author: Arthur La Bern
- Language: English
- Genre: Crime thriller
- Publisher: Marlowe
- Publication date: 1948
- Publication place: United Kingdom
- Media type: Print

Paper Orchid is a 1948 crime novel by the British writer Arthur La Bern. He had made his name three years earlier with It Always Rains on Sunday and also enjoyed success with this novel set amongst newspaper journalists on Fleet Street.

== Film adaptation ==
It was adapted into a 1949 film of the same title directed by Roy Ward Baker and starring Hugh Williams and Hy Hazell.

== Bibliography ==
- Goble, Alan. The Complete Index to Literary Sources in Film. Walter de Gruyter, 1999.
- Mayer, Geoff. Roy Ward Baker. Manchester University Press, 2004.
- Reilly, John M. Twentieth Century Crime & Mystery Writers. Springer, 2015.
