= It's a Long Way to Tipperary =

1912 Irish music hall song adopted as a marching song

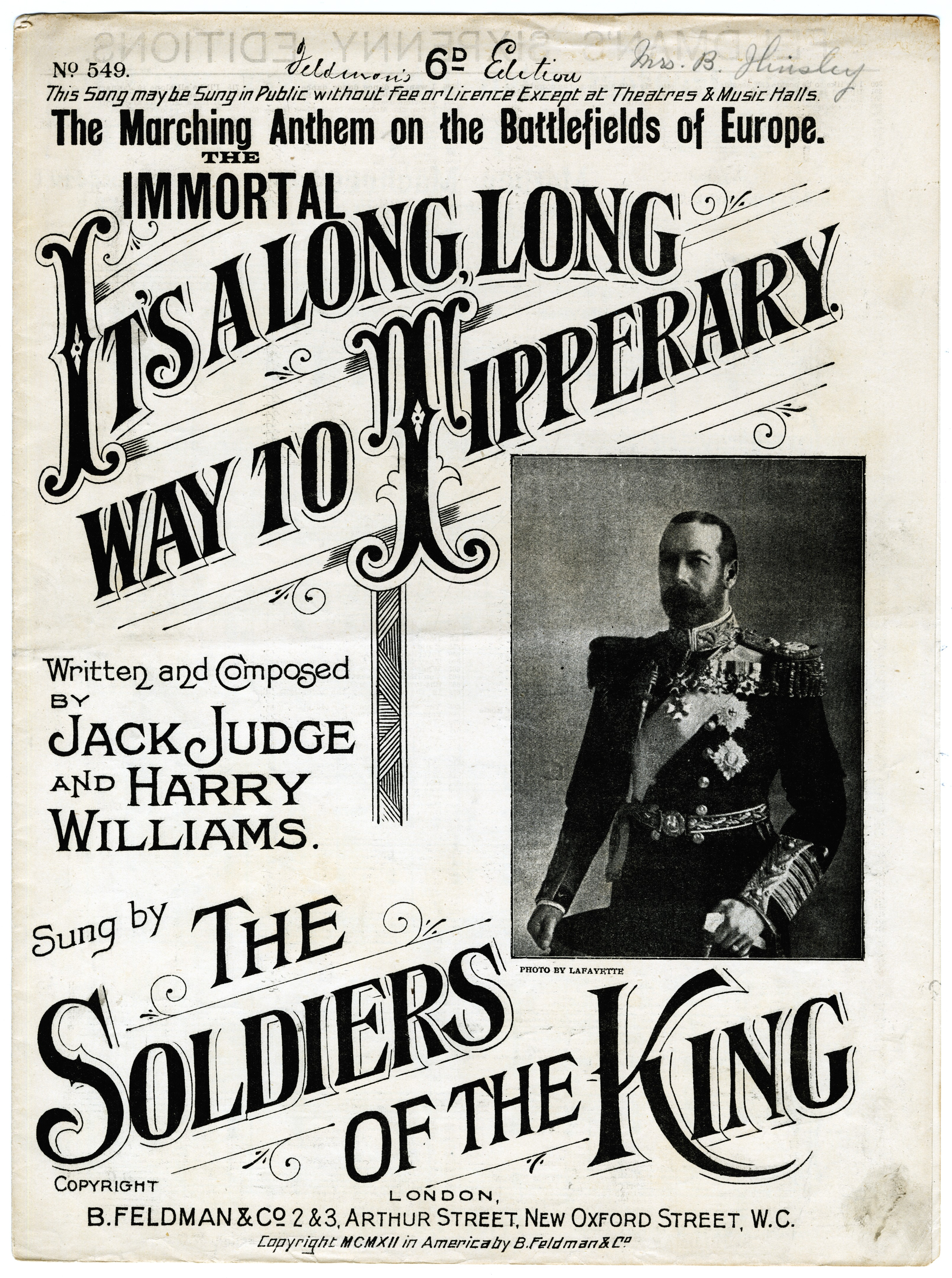
- Sheet music cover

Song
- Published: 1912
- Genre: Music hall, patriotic song, marching anthem
- Songwriters: Jack Judge and Harry Williams

It's a Long Way to Tipperary
"It's a Long Way to Tipperary", performed by Albert Farrington (1915)

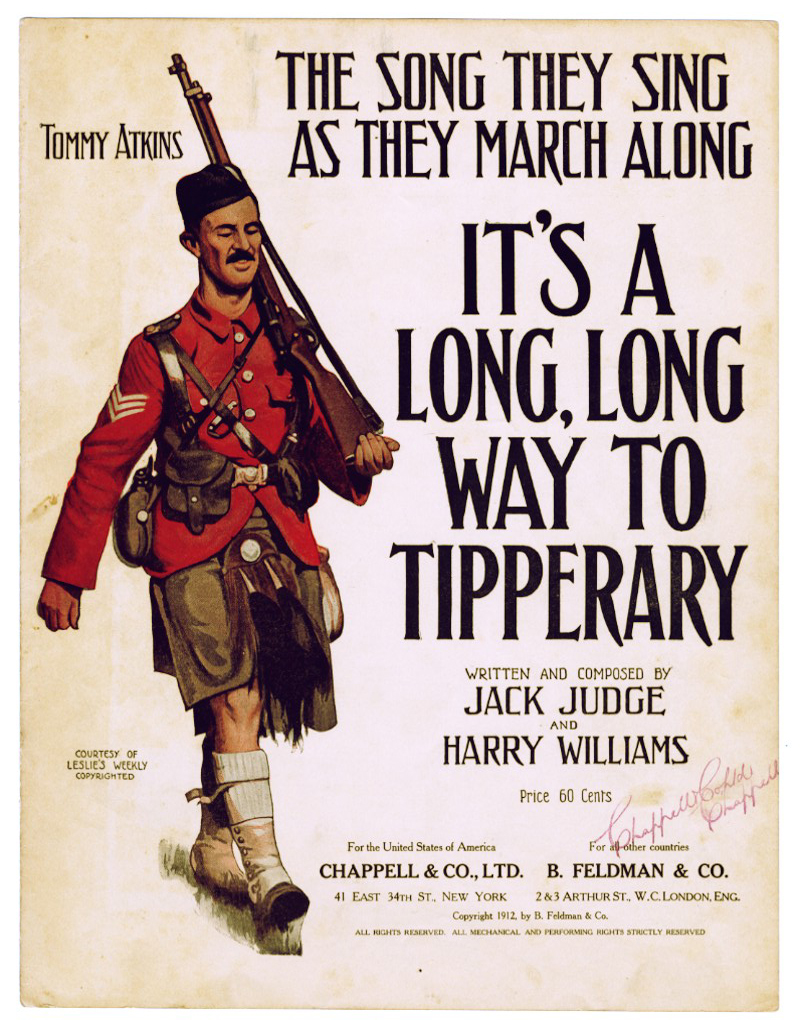
Sheet music cover

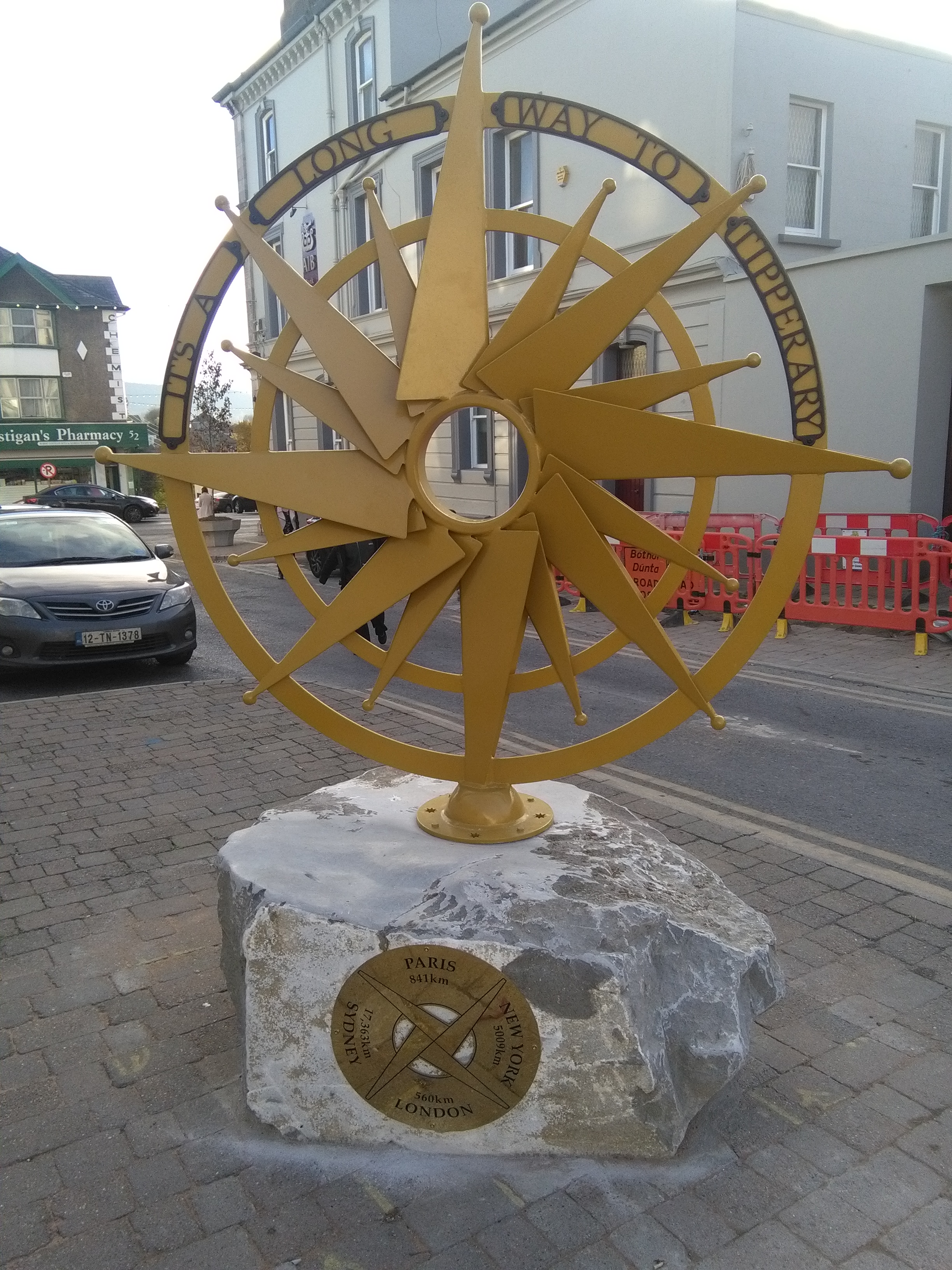
Sculpture in Tipperary Town, Ireland, commemorating the song

"It's a Long Way to Tipperary" (or "It's a Long, Long Way to Tipperary") is an English music hall song first performed in 1912 by Jack Judge, and written by Judge and Harry Williams, though authorship of the song has long been disputed.

It was recorded in 1914 by Irish tenor John McCormack. It was used as a marching song among soldiers in the First World War and is remembered as a song of that war. Welcoming signs in the town of Tipperary, Ireland, humorously declare "You've come a long way" in reference to the song.

== Authorship ==
Jack Judge's parents were Irish, and his grandparents came from Tipperary. Judge met Harry Williams (Henry James Williams, 23 September 1873 – 21 February 1924) in Oldbury, Worcestershire, at the Malt Shovel public house, where Williams's brother Ben was the licensee. Williams was severely disabled, having fallen down cellar steps as a child and badly broken both legs. He had developed a talent for writing verse and songs, and played the piano and mandolin, often in public. Judge and Williams began a long-term writing partnership that resulted in 32 music hall songs published by Bert Feldman. Many of the songs were composed by Williams and Judge at Williams's home, The Plough Inn (later renamed The Tipperary Inn), in Balsall Common. Because Judge could not read or write music, Williams taught them to Judge by ear.

Judge was a popular semi-professional performer in music halls. In January 1912, he was performing at the Grand Theatre in Stalybridge, and accepted a 5-shilling bet that he could compose and sing a new song by the next night. The following evening, 31 January, Judge performed "It's a Long Way to Tipperary" for the first time, and it immediately became a great success. The song was originally written and performed as a sentimental ballad, to be enjoyed by Irish expatriates living in London. Judge sold the rights to the song to Feldman in London, who agreed to publish it and other songs written by Judge with Williams. Feldman published the song as "It's a Long, Long Way to Tipperary" in October 1912, and promoted it as a march.

=== Dispute ===
Feldman paid royalties to both Judge and Williams, but after Williams's death in 1924, Judge claimed sole credit for writing the song, saying that he had agreed to Williams being co-credited as recompense for a debt that Judge owed. However, Williams's family showed that the tune and most of the lyrics to the song already existed in the form of a manuscript, "It's A Long Way to Connemara", co-written by Williams and Judge back in 1909, and Judge had used this, just changing some words, including changing "Connemara" to "Tipperary".

Judge said: "I was the sole composer of 'Tipperary', and all other songs published in our names jointly. They were all 95% my work, as Mr Williams made only slight alterations to the work he wrote down from my singing the compositions. He would write it down on music-lined paper and play it back, then I'd work on the music a little more ... I have sworn affidavits in my possession by Bert Feldman, the late Harry Williams and myself confirming that I am the composer ...". In a 1933 interview, he added: "The words and music of the song were written in the Newmarket Tavern, Corporation Street, Stalybridge on 31st January 1912, during my engagement at the Grand Theatre after a bet had been made that a song could not be written and sung the next evening ... Harry was very good to me and used to assist me financially, and I made a promise to him that if I ever wrote a song and published it, I would put his name on the copies and share the proceeds with him. Not only did I generously fulfil that promise, but I placed his name with mine on many more of my own published contributions. During Mr Williams' lifetime (as far as I know) he never claimed to be the writer of the song ...".

Williams's family campaigned in 2012 to have Harry Williams officially re-credited with the song, and shared their archives with the Imperial War Museums. The family estate still receives royalties from the song.

=== Other claims ===
In 1917, Alice Smyth Burton Jay sued song publishers Chappell & Co. for $100,000, alleging she wrote the tune in 1908 for a song played at the Alaska–Yukon–Pacific Exposition promoting the Washington apple industry. The chorus began "I'm on my way to Yakima". The court appointed Victor Herbert to act as expert advisor and dismissed the suit in 1920, since the authors of "Tipperary" had never been to Seattle and Victor Herbert testified the two songs were not similar enough to suggest plagiarism.

== Content ==
The song was originally written as a lament from an Irish worker in London, missing his homeland. Unlike popular songs of previous wars, such as the Second Boer War, it did not incite soldiers to glorious deeds, instead concentrating on the longing for home (as with the period song "Keep the Home Fires Burning").

=== Lyrics ===
Up to mighty London
Came an Irishman one day.
All the streets were paved with gold
So, everyone was gay,
Singing songs of Piccadilly,
Strand and Leicester Square,
Till Paddy got excited,
and he shouted to them there:

Chorus
It's a long way to Tipperary,
It's a long way to go.
It's a long way to Tipperary,
To the sweetest girl I know!
Goodbye, Piccadilly,
Farewell, Leicester Square!
It's a long long way to Tipperary,
But my heart's right there.

Paddy wrote a letter
To his Irish Molly-O,
Saying, "Should you not receive it,
Write and let me know!"
"If I make mistakes in spelling,
Molly, dear," said he,
"Remember, it's the pen that's bad,
Don't lay the blame on me!"

Chorus
It's a long way to Tipperary,
It's a long way to go.
It's a long way to Tipperary,
To the sweetest girl I know!
Goodbye, Piccadilly,
Farewell, Leicester Square!
It's a long long way to Tipperary,
But my heart's right there.

Molly wrote a neat reply
To Irish Paddy-O,
Saying "Mike Maloney
Wants to marry me, and so
Leave the Strand and Piccadilly
Or you'll be to blame,
For love has fairly drove me silly:
Hoping you're the same!"

Chorus
It's a long way to Tipperary,
It's a long way to go.
It's a long way to Tipperary,
To the sweetest girl I know!
Goodbye, Piccadilly,
Farewell, Leicester Square!
It's a long long way to Tipperary,
But my heart's right there.

The parody "It's the Wrong, Wrong Way to Tickle Mary" was published (as sheet music) by J. Will Callahan and Charles Brown in the United States in 1915. The bawdy lyrics suggest the performances of concert parties on the front lines of the war:

Chorus (1943 version)
That's the wrong way to tickle Mary,
That's the wrong way to kiss;
Don't you know that over in Paris
They like it like this?!
Hooray pour La France,
Farewell, Angleterre.
We didn't know the way to tickle Mary,
But we learned it right there!

== Reception ==
Feldman persuaded Florrie Forde to perform the song in 1913, but she disliked it and dropped it from her act. However, it became the hit song of 1913 and was widely popular when the First World War began the following year. British soldiers marching to Mons sang it. Daily Mail correspondent George Curnock saw the Irish regiment the Connaught Rangers singing this song as they marched through Boulogne on 13 August 1914, and reported it on 18 August 1914. Soon, every British newspaper had printed the lyrics to the chorus and it became a popular and patriotic tune amongst civilians. However, as soldiers lost their optimism for a quick end to the war they came to abhor the sentimental song and jeered down attempts to start it. F. T. Nettleingham, a veteran and anthologist of songs from the war, noted that the song was "never Tommy's song ... never greatly sung" though it was often the subject of parody. That civilians continued to hold it to be the soldiers' anthem illustrated a gap in understanding and alienated the fighting men.

In November 1914, it was recorded by Irish tenor John McCormack, which helped its worldwide popularity. There was also a popular recording by Mark Sheridan. In the United States, there were popular versions by Billy Murray, the American Quartet, Prince's Orchestra, and Albert Farrington.

The media of the time reported that the song was popular among soldiers despite (or because of) its irreverent and non-military theme, and was contrasted with the military and patriotic songs favoured by enemy troops. Commentators considered that the song's appeal revealed characteristically British qualities of being cheerful in the face of hardship. The Times suggested that "'Tipperary' may be less dignified, but it, and whatever else our soldiers may choose to sing will be dignified by their bravery, their gay patience, and their long suffering kindness... We would rather have their deeds than all the German songs in the world."

== Later performances ==
The song was featured as one of the songs in the 1951 film On Moonlight Bay, the 1960s stage musical and film Oh! What a Lovely War, and the 1970 musical Darling Lili, sung by Julie Andrews. It was also sung by the prisoners of war in Jean Renoir's film La Grande Illusion (1937) and as background music in The Russians Are Coming, the Russians Are Coming (1966). It is also the second part (the other two being "Hanging on the Old Barbed Wire" and "Mademoiselle from Armentières") of the regimental march of Princess Patricia's Canadian Light Infantry. Mystery Science Theater 3000 used it twice, sung by Crow T. Robot in Mystery Science Theater 3000: The Movie (1996), then sung again for the final television episode. It is also sung by British soldiers in the film The Travelling Players (1975) directed by Theo Angelopoulos, and by Czechoslovak soldiers in the movie Černí baroni (1992).

It is also featured in For Me and My Gal (1942) starring Judy Garland and Gene Kelly and Gallipoli (1981) starring Mel Gibson. It was sung by the crew of U-96 in Wolfgang Petersen's 1981 film Das Boot (the arrangement was performed by the Red Army Choir). Morale is boosted in the submarine when the German crew sings the song as they begin patrolling in the North Atlantic Ocean. The crew sings it a second time as they cruise toward home port after near-disaster.

The cast of The Mary Tyler Moore Show march off screen singing the song at the conclusion of the series' final episode, after news anchor Ted Baxter (played by Ted Knight) inexplicably recited some of the lyrics on that evening's news broadcast.

In the TV film of Goodnight, Mister Tom , Will and his friends sing it at his (Will's) birthday.

The song is often cited when documentary footage of the First World War is presented. One example of its use is in the annual television special It's the Great Pumpkin, Charlie Brown (1966). Snoopy—who fancies himself a First World War flying ace—dances to a medley of First World War-era songs played by Schroeder. The song is included, and at that point Snoopy falls into a left-right-left marching pace. Schroeder also plays the song in Snoopy Come Home (1972) at Snoopy's send-off party. Also, Snoopy is seen singing the song out loud in a series of strips about his going to the 1968 Winter Olympics. In another strip, Snoopy is walking such a long distance to reach Tipperary that he lies down exhausted and notes, "They're right, it is a long way to Tipperary." On a different occasion, Snoopy walks along and begins to sing the song, only to meet a sign that reads, "Tipperary: One Block." In a Sunday strip wherein Snoopy, in his World War I fantasy state, walks into Marcie's home, thinking it a French café, and falls asleep after drinking all her root beer, she rousts him awake by loudly singing the song.

In 1916, survivors of the sinking of HMS Tipperary in the Battle of Jutland were identified by their rescuers on HMS Sparrowhawk because they were singing "It's a Long Way to Tipperary" in their lifeboat.

In 1942, as the Japanese hell ship Lisbon Maru was sinking, Royal Artillery POWs trapped in the vessel are reported to have sung the song.

== Other versions and adaptations, cultural references ==
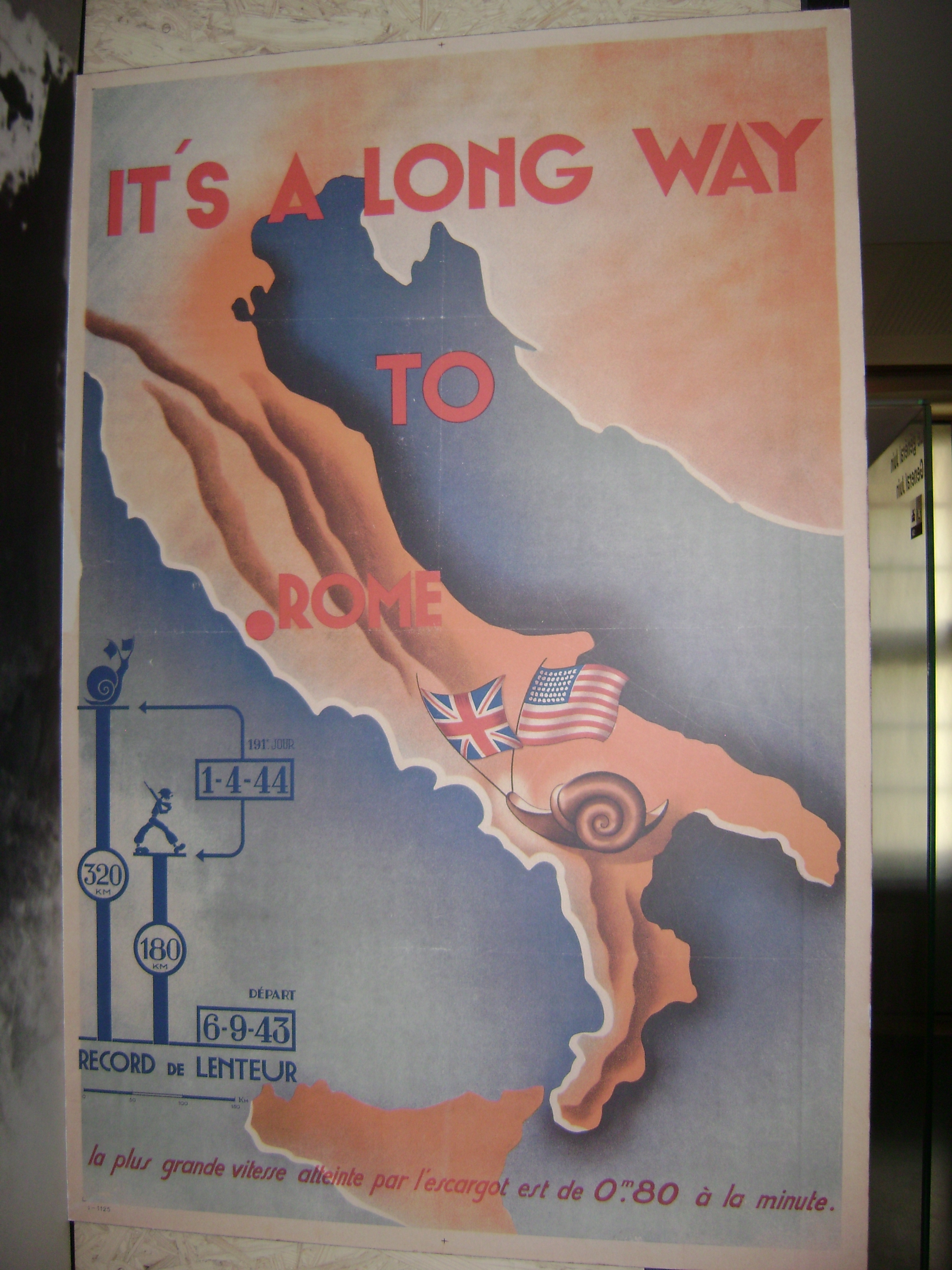
The song was so popular that its title is referenced in English in this German propaganda poster for distribution in occupied France.

- Around 1915, labour activist Joe Hill wrote "It's a Long Way Down to the Soup Line" using the tune of "It's a Long Way to Tipperary". The song first describes the plight of poor workers before the formation of a nationwide labour union consisting of all workers. Then, it describes the improved financial state of workers after a general strike by the nationwide labour union. Lastly it describes the wealth of the workers and the demise of the capitalists after a future communist revolution.
- In 1916, the Daily Mirror published the song in the languages of the Empire, including a version translated into Cornish by Henry Jenner.
- Echoes of the tune, sometimes in a minor key, are heard in Kenneth J. Alford's march "The Vanished Army" (1918), honoring fallen British soldiers.
- A Rhodesian version of the song, called "It's a Long Way to Mukumbura", became popular among Rhodesian soldiers during the country's Bush War in the 1970s.
- The Missouri Tigers, representing the University of Missouri, uses a version of "It's a Long Way to Tipperary" as a fight song, renamed "Every True Son". It is usually played as part of a medley, followed by a cheer and then "Fight, Tiger."
- The University of Oregon uses a contrafact of "It's a Long Way to Tipperary" as a fight song, renamed "Mighty Oregon".
- "It's a Long Way from Amphioxus", a song parody written by Philip H. Pope, is sung by students and scientists as an affirmation of evolution. Originally recorded by Sam Hinton, it is the official song of the Biological Sciences Division at the University of Chicago.
- The Club Atlético River Plate sports club from Buenos Aires, Argentina used the music from the song to create its hymn.
- The song is referenced extensively in the 1917 Billy Murray song "The Further It Is From Tipperary, The Closer It Is To Berlin".
- The song is sung several times throughout the 2021 The Simpsons Season 32 episode "The Man from G.R.A.M.P.A.".
- Singer Tiny Tim recorded a cover of the song twice, first in 1968 as a part of a medley with "There Will Always Be an England" and "Bless 'Em All", then in 1980 for his Chameleon album.
- The song is a recurring motif in the 2020 film Six Minutes to Midnight, notably in the last scene, on the eve of WWII, when the German schoolgirls have been reunited with their beloved principal Rocholl (played by Judi Dench).
- The song is referenced in the 1977 finale episode (”The Last Show”) of the American sitcom The Mary Tyler Moore Show in series 7, episode 24.
- The Bill Caddick song "The writing of Tipperary / It's a Long Way to Tipperary" intersperses the story of Jack Judge's writing the song with a potted history of the run-up to the First World War, followed by the song itself. He sang it on his album "Sunny Memories" in 1977, and it was covered by June Tabor on her 1999 album A Quiet Eye.
- An adapted version of the song was the first anthem of the Brazilian football club Fluminense Football Club in 1915.
- The song is sung by Crow T. Robot in Mystery Science Theater 3000: The Movie as he attempts to dig through the ship's hull to return to Earth.
- The song is featured in the Fallout 4 Mod Fallout London.
- The song is used as the intro to the debut album of 1914, Eschatology of War.
- The song is referenced several times in Archer.

== See also ==
- Goodbye Piccadilly, Farewell Leicester Square (novel)
- "Tipperary", another popular song, from 1907
- List of best-selling sheet music
