= The Set Up (1963 film) =

1963 British film by Gerard Glaister

- Australian theatrical release poster
- Directed by: Gerard Glaister
- Screenplay by: Roger Marshall
- Based on: a story by Edgar Wallace
- Produced by: Jack Greenwood
- Starring: Maurice Denham; John Carson; Maria Corvin
- Cinematography: Bert Mason
- Edited by: Derek Holding
- Music by: Bernard Ebbinghouse
- Production company: Merton Park Studios
- Distributed by: Anglo-Amalgamated
- Release date: 18 March 1963
- Running time: 57 minutes
- Country: United Kingdom
- Language: English

The Set Up (also known as The Set-up) is a 1963 British second feature film directed by Gerard Glaister and starring Maurice Denham, John Carson and Maria Corvin. Part of the series of Edgar Wallace Mysteries films made at Merton Park Studios, it was written by Roger Marshall based on a Wallace story.

== Plot ==
Arthur Payne has recently come out of prison. He meets Theo Gaunt, who persuades him to steal Gaunt's wife's jewellery. When Payne does the robbery he finds no jewellery in the house safe, only documents and a gun. Gaunt's wife surprises him, and he flees the house. She is later found dead, and widespread fingerprint evidence points to Payne being the murderer. But Inspector Jackson, the investigating officer, finds everything too neat, and is sympathetic to Payne's denial of murder. He eventually identifies the real culprit.

== Cast ==
- Maurice Denham as Theo Gaunt
- John Carson as Inspector Jackson
- Maria Corvin as Nicole Romain
- Brian Peck as Arthur Payne
- Anthony Bate as Ray Underwood
- John Arnatt as Superintendent Ross
- Manning Wilson as Sgt. Bates
- Pamela Greer as Sally
- Eric Dodson as Walker
- Reginald Barratt as Pop Medwin
- Billy Milton as Simpson
- Harry Littlewood as ticket collector

== Critical reception ==
The Monthly Film Bulletin wrote: "Another in the Edgar Wallace series, and rather below par, despite the welcome reappearance of Maurice Denham. Particularly weak is a scene in which Payne, eluding the police, is befriended by a girl in whose bungalow he is hiding. However, it all keeps moving to the customary climax in which all is revealed."
