= Frenzy =

1972 film by Alfred Hitchcock

- Theatrical release poster
- Directed by: Alfred Hitchcock
- Screenplay by: Anthony Shaffer
- Based on: Goodbye Piccadilly, Farewell Leicester Square by Arthur La Bern
- Produced by: Alfred Hitchcock
- Starring: Jon Finch; Alec McCowen; Barry Foster; Billie Whitelaw; Anna Massey; Barbara Leigh-Hunt; Bernard Cribbins; Vivien Merchant
- Cinematography: Gil Taylor
- Edited by: John Jympson
- Music by: Ron Goodwin
- Production company: Alfred J. Hitchcock Productions
- Distributed by: Universal Pictures
- Release date: 21 June 1972
- Running time: 116 minutes
- Country: United Kingdom
- Language: English
- Budget: $2 million
- Box office: $12.6 million

Frenzy is a 1972 British neo-noir thriller film directed and produced by Alfred Hitchcock. It is the penultimate feature film of his extensive career. The screenplay by Anthony Shaffer is based on the 1966 novel Goodbye Piccadilly, Farewell Leicester Square by Arthur La Bern. The film stars Jon Finch, Alec McCowen and Barry Foster and features Billie Whitelaw, Anna Massey, Barbara Leigh-Hunt, Bernard Cribbins and Vivien Merchant. The original music score was composed by Ron Goodwin.

The plot centres on a serial killer in contemporary London and the ex-RAF serviceman he implicates. In a very early scene there is dialogue that mentions two actual London serial murder cases: the Christie murders in the 1940s–1950s and the Jack the Ripper murders in 1888.

Frenzy was the third and final film that Hitchcock made in Britain after he moved to Hollywood in 1939. The other two were Under Capricorn (1949) and Stage Fright (1950). (Note: There were some interior and exterior scenes filmed in London for The Man Who Knew Too Much (1956).) The last film he made in Britain before his move to the United States was Jamaica Inn (1939). Frenzy was the only Hitchcock film given an R rating in the United States during its initial release. Frenzy was screened at the 1972 Cannes Film Festival, but it was not entered into the main competition. It was also a commercial success, and was nominated in four categories at the 30th Golden Globes, including Best Motion Picture – Drama and Best Director.

Some critics—such as Raymond Foery, author of Alfred Hitchcock's Frenzy: The Last Masterpiece—consider Frenzy the last great Hitchcock film, and a return to form after his two previous works: Torn Curtain (1966) and Topaz (1969).

== Plot ==
Former RAF squadron leader Richard Blaney is fired from his job as a barman in a pub near Covent Garden. He laments his loss with his friend Bob Rusk, who runs a fruit and vegetable stall in Covent Garden. Rusk consoles him and gives a tip on a forthcoming horse race, but Blaney has no money to bet. He visits his ex-wife Brenda, who runs a successful matchmaking agency, and complains loudly about his situation. They briefly argue, but she invites him to dinner. Broke, Blaney ends up spending the night at a Salvation Army shelter, where he discovers that Brenda has slipped money into his coat pocket.

The following day, Rusk, whom the agency has turned away because of his creepy sexual proclivities, arrives at Brenda's office. Finding her alone, he rapes her, then strangles her with his necktie, revealing that he is the serial killer whom the newspapers have dubbed the "Necktie Murderer". After Rusk leaves, Blaney arrives, hoping to talk to Brenda again, but he finds her office locked. Brenda's secretary, returning from lunch, sees Blaney leaving. When the murder is discovered, Blaney becomes the prime suspect.

Blaney meets up with Babs Milligan, his former pub co-worker, and convinces her that he is innocent. The two stay at a hotel, where they have sex, then narrowly dodge the police. They appeal to one of Blaney's former RAF colleagues for help, but the man's wife refuses to harbour a fugitive. Blaney persuades Babs to fetch his belongings from the pub, so he can flee. While there, Babs runs into Rusk, who offers to let her use his flat for the night. After taking Babs there, he rapes and murders her. He hides her body in a sack and, late that night, stows it in the back of a lorry carrying potatoes.

Back in his room, Rusk discovers that his distinctive jewelled tie pin (with the initial R) is missing, and realises that Babs must have torn it off while he was strangling her. Knowing the tie pin will incriminate him, Rusk goes to retrieve it, but the lorry starts off on its journey while he is still inside. In spite of the bumpy ride, he retrieves the pin that is still clutched in Babs's hand. Dishevelled and covered in potato dust, he gets out at a roadside café, then returns to his Covent Garden flat. When Babs's body is discovered, Blaney is suspected of her murder as well as Brenda's.

Unaware that Rusk is the actual murderer, Blaney turns to him for help. Rusk offers to hide Blaney at his flat and then tips off the police. In the face of this treachery, Blaney realises that Rusk must be the murderer. At the trial, the jury finds Blaney guilty. During the trial and while being led away to prison, Blaney loudly protests that he is innocent and that Rusk is the real killer. Chief Inspector Oxford reconsiders the evidence and quietly investigates Rusk. He discusses the case with his wife while trying to avoid eating the unappetising food she has learned to prepare in an "exotic cooking" course.

Now in prison, Blaney vows to escape and avenge himself on Rusk. He deliberately injures himself and is taken to hospital, where his fellow inmate patients help him escape. He goes to Rusk's flat; thinking that Rusk is sleeping, Blaney strikes on the head the person who is in the bed, covered in bed linens. He discovers the person he hit was not Rusk, but a woman already dead in Rusk's bed, strangled with Rusk's necktie. Inspector Oxford, who has anticipated that Blaney would go after Rusk, arrives to find Blaney with the dead woman. Just as Blaney begins to protest his innocence, the two hear a loud banging noise coming from the stairwell. Rusk enters, dragging a large trunk into the flat, and is confronted by Blaney and Oxford. Oxford sardonically points out, "Mr. Rusk, you’re not wearing your tie".

== Cast ==
- Jon Finch as Richard Blaney
- Alec McCowen as Chief Inspector Timothy Oxford
- Barry Foster as Bob Rusk
- Billie Whitelaw as Hetty Porter
- Anna Massey as Babs Milligan
- Barbara Leigh-Hunt as Brenda Blaney
- Bernard Cribbins as Felix Forsythe
- Vivien Merchant as Mrs Oxford
- Michael Bates as Sergeant Spearman
- Jean Marsh as Monica Barling
- Clive Swift as Johnny Porter
- John Boxer as Sir George
- Madge Ryan as Mrs Davison
- Elsie Randolph as Gladys
- Jimmy Gardner as Hotel porter
- Gerald Sim as Solicitor in pub
- Noel Johnson as Doctor in pub

Uncredited

- Rita Webb as Mrs Rusk
- Michael Sheard as Jim, Rusk's friend in pub
- Richard Stapley as Lorry driver
- Susan Travers as Rusk's final victim

Alfred Hitchcock's cameo appearance can be seen three minutes into the film in the centre of a crowd scene, wearing a bowler hat. Teaser trailers show a Hitchcock-like dummy floating in the River Thames and Hitchcock introducing the audience to Covent Garden via the fourth wall.

== Production ==
=== Development ===
After a pair of unsuccessful films depicting political intrigue and espionage, Hitchcock returned to the murder genre with this film. The narrative makes use of the familiar Hitchcock theme of an innocent man overwhelmed by circumstantial evidence and wrongly assumed to be guilty.

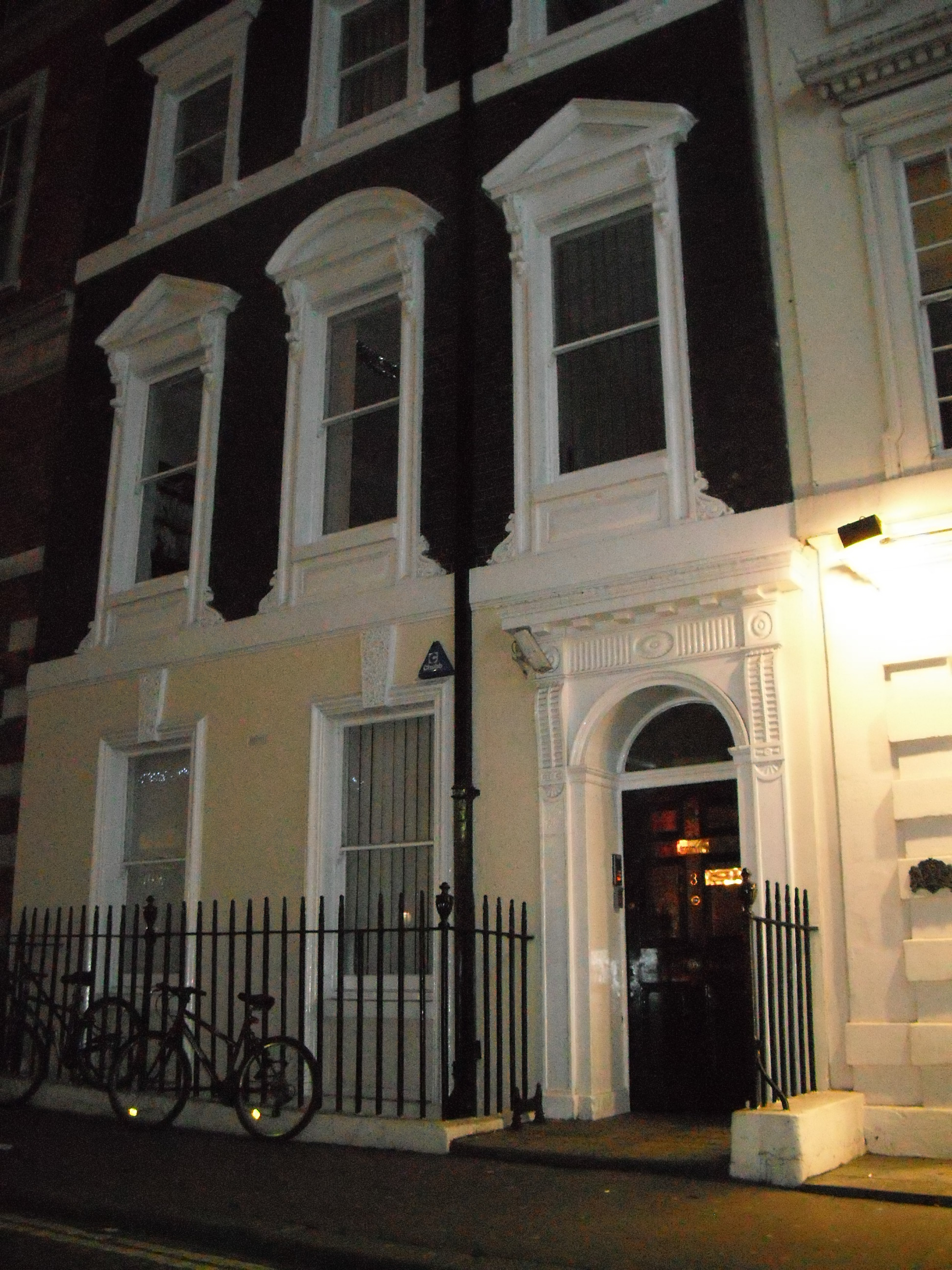
3 Henrietta Street in Covent Garden was the flat of the "Necktie Murderer", Robert Rusk

Hitchcock announced the project in March 1968.

Hitchcock initially approached Vladimir Nabokov to write the script, but the author turned him down because he was busy on a book. He then hired Anthony Shaffer.

"It will be done comedically", said Hitchcock.

=== Casting ===
The film starred relative newcomers in the lead roles. "I prefer a fresh face", he said.

Michael Caine was Hitchcock's first choice for the role of Rusk, the main antagonist, but as Caine later said, "He offered me the part of a sadist who murdered women and I won't play that. I have a sort of moral thing and I refused to play it and he never spoke to me again."

Barry Foster was cast after Hitchcock saw him in Twisted Nerve (which featured Frenzy co-star Billie Whitelaw). Foster said that, in order to prepare for his role, he was asked by Hitchcock to study two books about Neville Heath, an English double murderer who would often pass himself off as an officer in the RAF.

Vanessa Redgrave reportedly turned down the role of Brenda, and David Hemmings (who had co-starred with Redgrave in Blowup) was considered to play Blaney.

Helen Mirren, who later in life played Hitchcock's wife Alma Reville in Hitchcock, met with the director to discuss the role of Babs Milligan. "I didn't like Hitchcock very much," Mirren said years later, "and he didn't like me very much either ... I didn't really want to be in the movie."

Malcolm McDowell was offered a role in the film, but found the script to be "absolute rubbish" and declined. Despite his opinion on the script remaining the same, he later admitted to regretting turning down the opportunity to work with Hitchcock.

=== Filming ===
Filming began in July 1971.

Hitchcock shot Frenzy in London after many years making films in the United States. The film opens with a sweeping shot along the Thames to Tower Bridge; and while the interior scenes were filmed at Pinewood Studios, much of the location filming was done in and around Covent Garden and was a homage to the London of Hitchcock's childhood. The son of a Covent Garden merchant himself, Hitchcock filmed several key scenes showing the area as the working produce market it was. Aware that the area's days as a market were numbered, Hitchcock wanted to record the area as he remembered it. According to the "making-of" feature on the DVD, an elderly man who remembered Hitchcock's father as a dealer in the vegetable market came to visit the set during the filming and was treated to lunch by the director.

No. 31, Ennismore Gardens Mews, was used as the home of Brenda Margaret Blaney during the filming of Frenzy.

During shooting for the film, Hitchcock's wife and long-time collaborator Alma had a stroke. As a result, some sequences were shot without Hitchcock on the set so he could tend to his wife.

Frenzy was the first Hitchcock film to contain nudity (with the arguable exception of the shower scene in Psycho). The nude scenes used body doubles in place of Barbara Leigh-Hunt and Anna Massey. The nude scene which shows the first victim being raped and strangled was called by Donald Spoto "one of the most repellent examples of a detailed murder in the history of film". There are a number of classic Hitchcock set pieces in the film, particularly the long tracking shot down the stairs when Babs is murdered. The camera moves down the stairs, out of the doorway (with a rather clever edit just after the camera exits the door which marks where the scene moves from the studio to the location footage) and across the street, where the usual activity in the market district goes on with patrons unaware that a murder is occurring in the building. A second sequence set in the back of a delivery truck full of potatoes increases the suspense, as the murderer Rusk attempts to retrieve his tie pin from the corpse of Babs. Rusk struggles with the hand and has to break the fingers of the corpse in order to retrieve his tie pin and try to escape unseen from the truck.

The part of London shown in the film still exists more or less intact, but the fruit and vegetable market no longer operates from that site, having relocated in 1974. The buildings seen in the film are now occupied by banks and legal offices, restaurants and nightclubs, such as Henrietta Street, where Rusk lived (and Babs met her untimely demise). Oxford Street, which had the back alley (Dryden Chambers, now demolished) leading to Brenda Blaney's matrimonial agency, is the busiest shopping area in Britain. Nell of Old Drury, which is the public house where the doctor and solicitor had their frank, plot-assisting discussion on sex killers, is still a thriving bar. The lanes where merchants and workers once carried their produce, as seen in the film, are now occupied by tourists and street performers.

== Music ==
Henry Mancini was originally hired as the film's composer. "If the same film was made ten years ago it would've had twice the amount of music in it", he said.

His opening theme was written in Bachian organ andante, opening in D minor, for organ and an orchestra of strings and brass, and was intended to express the formality of the grey London landmarks, but Hitchcock thought it sounded too much like Bernard Herrmann's scores. According to Mancini, "Hitchcock came to the recording session, listened awhile and said: 'Look, if I want Herrmann, I'd ask for Herrmann.'" After an enigmatic, behind-the-scenes melodrama, the composer was fired. He never understood the experience, insisting that his score sounded nothing like Herrmann's work. Mancini had to pay all transportation and accommodation costs himself. In his autobiography, Mancini reports that the discussions between himself and Hitchcock seemed clear, and he thought he understood what was wanted; but he was replaced and flew back home to Hollywood. The irony was that Mancini was being second-guessed for being too dark and symphonic after having been criticised for being too light before. Mancini's experience with Frenzy was a painful topic for the composer for years to come.

Hitchcock then hired composer Ron Goodwin to write the score after being impressed with some of his earlier work. He had Goodwin rescore the opening titles in the style of a London travelogue; the director had heard his score for the Peter Sellers sketch Balham, Gateway to the South. Goodwin's music had a lighter tone in the opening scenes, and scenes featuring London scenery, while there were darker undertones in certain other scenes.

In 2023, Quartet Records issued a soundtrack album featuring both the Goodwin score and the unused Mancini score.

== Reception ==
=== Box office ===
The film was a commercial success, grossing $12.6 million at the box office worldwide ($96.9 million with 2025 inflation) from a $2 million ($15.3 million in 2025 inflation) budget.

=== Critical response ===
Frenzy received largely highly positive reviews from critics. Vincent Canby of The New York Times called it "a passionately entertaining film" with "a marvelously funny script" and a "superb" cast. He included it on his year-end list of the ten best films of 1972. Variety also posted a rave review, declaring: "Ingeniously fresh story-telling ideas, stamped with the same mischievous, audacious and often outrageous mixture of humor and suspense that first made him and later sustained him, make the Universal release one of Hitchcock's major achievements." Roger Ebert gave the film his highest grade of four stars, calling it "a return to old forms by the master of suspense, whose newer forms have pleased movie critics but not his public. This is the kind of thriller Hitchcock was making in the 1940s, filled with macabre details, incongruous humor, and the desperation of a man convicted of a crime he didn't commit." Penelope Gilliatt of The New Yorker wrote of Hitchcock that "we are nearly back in the days of his great English films", adding "He is lucky to have been able to draw on Anthony Shaffer to do Frenzy's sly screenplay, not to speak of a cast of first-rate, well-equated actors pretty much unknown outside England, so that audiences have no preconceptions about who are the stars and therefore unkillable." Kevin Thomas of the Los Angeles Times called the film "Alfred Hitchcock's best picture in years", with "all the marks of work by a master at his craft and at his most assured". Time printed a very positive review of the film: "In case there was any doubt, back in the dim days of Marnie and Topaz, Hitchcock is still in fine form. Frenzy is the dazzling proof. It is not at the level of his greatest work, but it is smooth and shrewd and dexterous, a reminder that anyone who makes a suspense film is still an apprentice to this old master." In its 2012 review, The Guardian called Frenzy a "complex and gripping thriller" praising the film as "a rich tapestry of suspense, and a masterpiece".

Some reviews were more mixed. Gary Arnold of The Washington Post wrote that the film "has a promising opening sequence and a witty curtain line, but the material in between is decidedly pedestrian. The reviewers who've been hailing Frenzy as a new classic and the triumphant return of the master of suspense are, to put it kindly, exaggerating the occasion ... If this picture had been made by anyone else, it would be described, justly, as a mildly diverting attempt to imitate Hitchcock." The Monthly Film Bulletin was unsure what to make of the picture, noting an "old-fashioned air" to it that seemed to suggest that Hitchcock's return to England "signalled a regression to an almost pre-war style of filmmaking". It concluded: "For all its apparent awkwardness of script and characterisation (Jon Finch especially can make little of Shaffer's anemically written hero) there is enough in Frenzy to suggest that, after the routine critical dismissals, it will repay serious assessment."

In a 29 May 1972 letter to the editor of The Times, novelist La Bern said he found Hitchcock's production and Shaffer's adaptation of his book "appalling", concluding: "Finally, I wish to dissociate myself with Mr Shaffer's grotesque misrepresentation of Scotland Yard offices."

Frenzy ranked 14th on Variety's list of the Big Rental Films of 1972, with rentals of $6.3 million in the United States and Canada.

The film was the subject of the 2012 book Alfred Hitchcock's Frenzy: The Last Masterpiece by Raymond Foery. On the review aggregator website Rotten Tomatoes, Frenzy holds an approval rating of 91% based on 44 reviews, with an average rating of 7.3/10. The website's critics consensus reads, "Marking Alfred Hitchcock's return to England and first foray into viscerally explicit carnage, Frenzy finds the master of horror regaining his grip on the audience's pulse – and making their blood run cold." Metacritic, which uses a weighted average, assigned the film a score of 92 out of 100, based on 15 critics, indicating "universal acclaim".

=== Accolades ===
Institution	Year	Category	Nominee	Result
CEC Awards	1973	Best Foreign Film		Won
Edgar Awards	1973	Best Motion Picture Screenplay	Anthony Shaffer	Nominated
Golden Globe Awards	1973	Best Motion Picture – Drama		Nominated
Golden Globe Awards	1973	Best Director	Alfred Hitchcock	Nominated
Golden Globe Awards	1973	Best Screenplay	Anthony Shaffer	Nominated
Golden Globe Awards	1973	Best Original Score	Ron Goodwin	Nominated
National Board of Review	1972	Top Ten Films		Won
National Society of Film Critics	1973	Best Supporting Actor	Barry Foster	Nominated

== See also ==
- List of British films of 1972
- List of films considered the best
