= Night Darkens the Street =

1947 novel

- Author: Arthur La Bern
- Language: English
- Genre: Crime drama
- Publisher: Nicholson and Watson
- Publication date: 1947
- Publication place: United Kingdom
- Media type: Print

Night Darkens the Street is a 1947 crime novel by the British writer Arthur La Bern. The title is taken from a line of Paradise Lost by John Milton. It is also known as Night Darkens the Streets. It was inspired by the Cleft chin murder of 1944.

== Synopsis ==
Glen Rawlins, a teenager with ambitions, runs away from her drab Pimlico home and becomes mixed up with the shady but seemingly glamorous world of London's West End nightclubs. Attractive but starry-eyed and naïve, she ends up falling in with a deserter from the American army who draws her into murder.

== Film adaptation ==
In 1948 it was adapted into the British film noir Good-Time Girl directed by David MacDonald and starring Jean Kent, Dennis Price and Herbert Lom.

== Bibliography ==
- Goble, Alan. The Complete Index to Literary Sources in Film. Walter de Gruyter, 1999.
- Mayer, Geoff. Roy Ward Baker. Manchester University Press, 2004.
- Murphy, Robert. Realism and Tinsel: Cinema and Society in Britain 1939–48. Routledge, 1992.
- Reilly, John M. Twentieth Century Crime & Mystery Writers. Springer, 2015.
