= Jack Judge =

British songwriter and music-hall entertainer

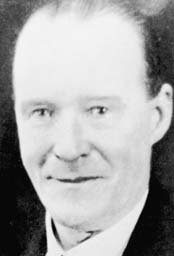
- Born: John Judge; 3 December 1872; Oldbury, Worcestershire, England
- Died: 25 July 1938 (aged 65); West Bromwich, Staffordshire, England
- Monuments: Bronze statue, Lord Pendry Square, Stalybridge
- Occupations: Song-writer; Music-hall entertainer
- Known for: Songwriting
- Notable work: "It's a Long Way to Tipperary"

John Judge (3 December 1872 – 25 July 1938) was an English songwriter and music-hall entertainer best remembered for writing the song "It's a Long Way to Tipperary". Judge originally wrote and sang the song in 1912, but the far more widely known John McCormack acquired greater name recognition with the song.

== Life ==
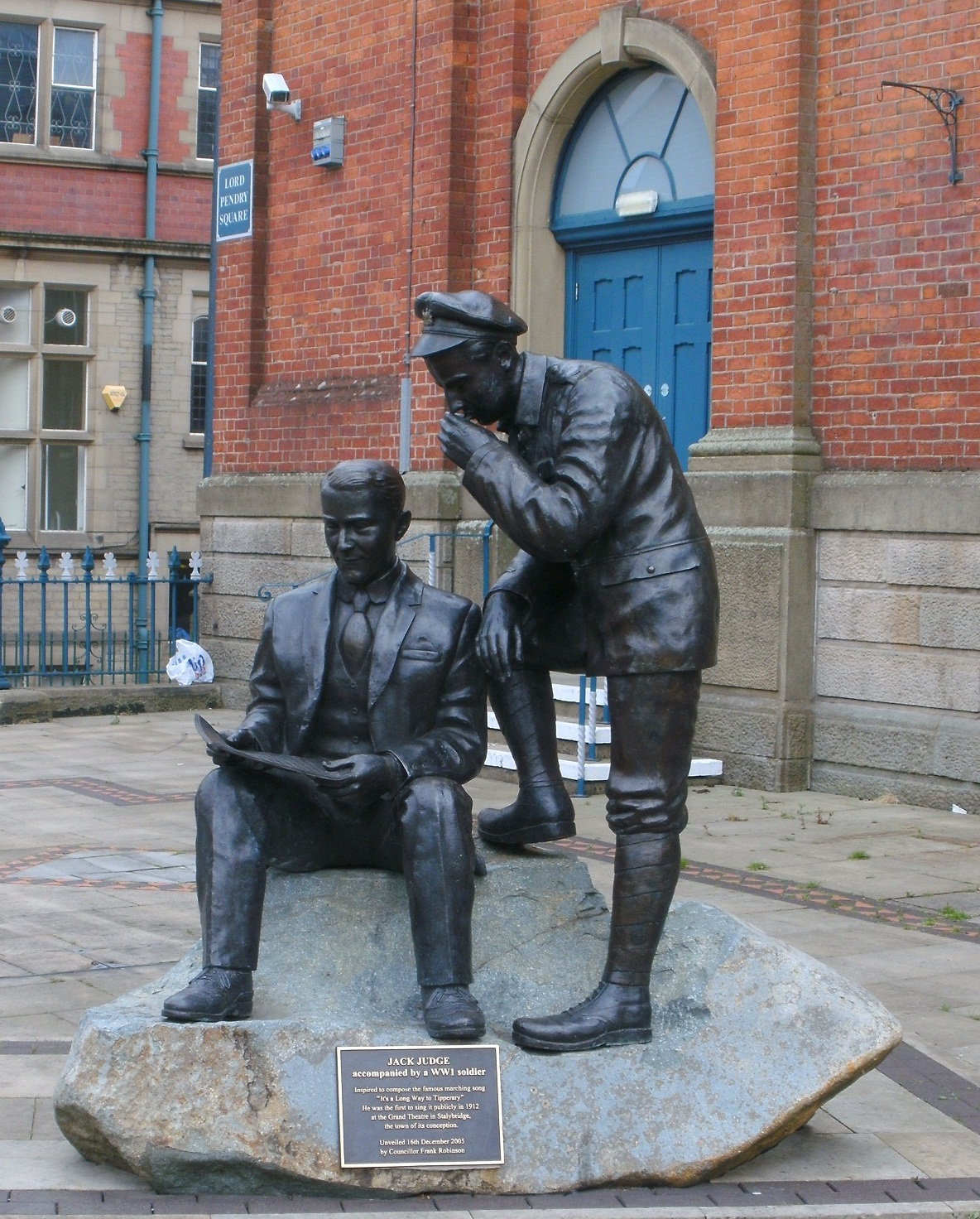
Bronze statue commemorating Jack Judge in Stalybridge created by John Cox (sculptor)

Judge was born in Worcestershire, England on 3 December 1872. Judge's parents were Irish, from County Mayo. He was originally a fishmonger, and took to the stage after winning a talent contest.

It's a Long Way to Tipperary
It's a Long Way to Tipperary, performed by Albert Farrington

At the time his famous song was written, he was performing at "The Grand Theatre", Stalybridge, Cheshire. He allegedly wrote the song for a five shilling bet on 30 January 1912 and performed it the next night at "The Grand". However, many people, including the Judge family, dispute this and say the song was written in his home town of Oldbury.

In 1918 he published "Jerusalem" through B. Feldman and Co.

The legal rights to "It's a Long Way to Tipperary" were purchased by a British music publishing company, Feldman, for £5. Harry Williams (died 1924), a neighbour of Judge, was co-attributed as composer. Later in his life when he became very unwell, the company gave him a weekly pension of £1.

John McCormack recorded the song in 1914, which gave it worldwide popularity. Judge had recorded "The Place Where I Was Born" in 1915, when he was aged 42 and already a big star. Written before the outbreak of World War I, this is one of his few serious songs, and is a sensitive comment about the working man's compassion for others during hard times. In the same year he recorded "Paddy Maloney's Aeroplane" and "Michael O'Leary, V.C.", both about Irishmen contributing to the war effort. As well as songs for the stage, he wrote a number of football songs in support of his beloved West Bromwich Albion F.C. He continued recording through the 1920s.

Judge died 25 July 1938 and was buried at Rood End Cemetery, Oldbury.

A bronze statue of Judge has been erected at Lord Pendry Square in Stalybridge. The recently opened public library in his home town of Oldbury bears his name.
