= Master Spy =

1963 British film by Montgomery Tully

- US release film poster
- Directed by: Montgomery Tully
- Screenplay by: Maurice J. Wilson; Montgomery Tully
- Based on: They Also Serve by Gerald Anstruther and Paul White
- Produced by: Maurice J. Wilson
- Starring: Stephen Murray; June Thorburn; Alan Wheatley; John Carson
- Cinematography: Geoffrey Faithfull
- Edited by: Eric Boyd-Perkins
- Music by: Ken Thorne
- Production company: Eternal Films
- Distributed by: Grand National Pictures; Allied Artists (USA)
- Release dates: August 19, 1963; August 19, 1964 (US)
- Running time: 70 minutes
- Country: United Kingdom
- Language: English

Master Spy (also known as Checkmate) is a 1963 British spy film directed by Montgomery Tully and starring Stephen Murray, June Thorburn and Alan Wheatley. The screenplay was by Tully and Maurice J. Wilson based on the short story "They Also Serve" by Gerald Anstruther and Paul White.

The US release film poster identifies the Master Spy as Agent 909.

== Plot ==
A Russian nuclear scientist, Dr Boris Turganev, defects from an unnamed country to the West. He is employed by the UK Government at a top secret scientific establishment to continue his work on neutron rays. He is introduced to a wealthy local man, Paul Skelton, and they identify themselves to each other as spies. Turganev's colleagues start to suspect he is stealing secrets for the communists; Turganev passes information to Skelton under the cover of their private games of chess. British Intelligence arrests them, and they are tried and sentenced to long prison terms.

Turganev's colleague is puzzled that the secret document which Turganev was passing to Skelton had been altered and would not work. In a plot twist, it is revealed that Turganev was working for British Intelligence, who suspected Skelton and wanted to catch his spy ring. A prison escape is engineered for Turganev so that he can return to his own country and continue his activities for the British with his cover intact.

== Cast ==
- Stephen Murray as Boris Turganev
- June Thorburn as Leila Telford
- Alan Wheatley as Paul Skelton
- John Carson as Richard Colman
- John Bown as John Baxter
- Jack Watson as Captain Foster
- Ernest Clark as Doctor Pembury
- Peter Gilmore as Tom Masters
- Marne Maitland as Doctor Asafu
- Ellen Pollock as Dr Mary Morrell
- Hugh Morton as Sir Gilbert Saunders
- Basil Dignam as Richard Horton
- Victor Beaumont as Petrov
- Hamilton Dyce as airport controller
- Michael Peake as Barnes
- Dan Cressey as policeman (uncredited)
- Derek Francis as police Inspector (uncredited)
- John G. Heller as police officer (uncredited)
- Aileen Lewis as woman boarding a plane (uncredited)
- John H. Watson as detective at airport (uncredited)

== Critical reception ==
The Monthly Film Bulletin wrote: "Placid and plodding, this spy story is distinguished only by a few nice touches of characterisation."

The New York Times called the film "a TEPID, square-cut espionage drama."

The Radio Times Guide to Films gave the film 1/5 stars, writing: "There isn't an atom of suspense in Montgomery Tully's tepid thriller about spying scientists. Indeed, the most exciting moments are the games of chess during which defector Stephen Murray passes vital secrets to communist squire, Alan Wheatley. There's a valiant attempt to put a sting in the tail, but only lab assistant June Thorburn fails to see through the slenderest web of deception."

AllMovie wrote, "While only 71 minutes, Master Spy has enough plot twists for a library-full of Fleming and LeCarre."
