= Pamela Greer =

British actress and writer (1941–2026)

- Born: Pamela Edith Greer; 7 March 1941; Luanshya, Northern Rhodesia
- Died: 4 May 2026 (aged 85); Kirstenhof, Cape Town, South Africa
- Other name: Luanshya Greer
- Occupations: Actress, writer
- Years active: 1960–1992
- Spouse(s): Peter Fraser (m. 1961, divorced) John Carson (m. 1974; died 2016)
- Children: 2

Pamela Edith Greer (7 March 1941 – 4 May 2026), later known as Luanshya Greer, was a British actress, who is best known for her roles on television during the 1960s.

== Life and career ==
Pamela Edith Greer was born in Luanshya, Northern Rhodesia on 7 March 1941. In 1966, she changed her name to Luanshya Greer (taken from the name of the town where she was born), and became a writer for television shows including Dixon of Dock Green, Thriller and Triangle.

She was married to actors Peter Fraser and John Carson, having two children with the latter.

She died in Kirstenhof, Cape Town, South Africa on 4 May 2026, aged 85.

== Selected filmography ==
=== Film ===
- They Came from Beyond Space (1967) as Girl Attendant
- The Set Up (1963) as Sally
- Candidate for Murder (1962) (Edgar Wallace Mysteries)

=== Television ===
- Z-Cars (6 episodes) as WPC Shepherd
- Softly, Softly
- Doctor Who (in the serial The Daleks' Master Plan) as "Lizan"
- The Likely Lads ("Last of the Big Spenders")
- No Hiding Place as "Sheila Laurence"
- Riviera Police
