= Accidental Death (film) =

1963 British film by Geoffrey Nethercott

- Theatrical release poster
- Directed by: Geoffrey Nethercott
- Written by: Arthur La Bern
- Based on: a story by Edgar Wallace
- Produced by: Jack Greenwood
- Starring: John Carson; Jacqueline Ellis; Derrick Sherwin
- Cinematography: James Wilson
- Edited by: Geoffrey Muller
- Music by: Bernard Ebbinghouse
- Production company: Merton Park Studios
- Distributed by: Anglo-Amalgamated Film Distributors
- Release date: 1963
- Running time: 55 minutes
- Country: United Kingdom
- Language: English

Accidental Death (also known as Jack of Judgement) is a 1963 British drama directed by Geoffrey Nethercott and starring John Carson, Jacqueline Ellis, and Derrick Sherwin. It was written by Arthur La Bern based on a story by Edgar Wallace.

It was made at Merton Park Studios as part of the long-running series of Edgar Wallace adaptations.

== Plot ==
Henriette has a strained relationship with her guardian, Col. Johnnie Paxton, whose life was saved by Henriette's parents during the war. Upon returning from a party, Henriette and her boyfriend are surprised by an intruder. The intruder says he is here to kill the man who collaborated with the Nazis and caused the death of his fiancée.

== Cast ==
- John Carson as Paul Lanson
- Jacqueline Ellis as Henriette
- Derrick Sherwin as Alan
- Richard Vernon as Johnnie Paxton
- Jean Lodge as Brenda
- Gerald Case as Police Inspector
- Jacqueline Lacey as Milly
- Rilla Madden as nurse

== Critical reception ==
The Monthly Film Bulletin wrote: "In the context of the Edgar Wallace series, this melodrama has a tinge of the off-beat about it, though this is offset to some extent by a general air of theatricality. Certainly the dénouement, in which the quite suspenseful swimming-pool climax leaves the central mystery unresolved, is unusual: instead of providing the audience with a neatly sewn-up solution, it presents a set of questions."
