= Peter Fraser (actor) =

Scottish retired actor (born 1932/1933)

- Fraser in the documentary Future Memories: Making 'The Dalek Invasion of Earth' (2003)
- Born: 1932 or 1933 (age 93–94); Edinburgh, Scotland
- Occupation: Actor
- Years active: 1958–1981
- Known for: Doctor Who
- Spouse: Pamela Greer (m. 1961, divorced)

Peter Fraser (born 1932 or 1933) is a Scottish retired actor best known for playing freedom fighter David Campbell in the 1964 Doctor Who serial The Dalek Invasion of Earth. Campbell was a significant character, as his love for the Doctor's granddaughter Susan caused her to be the first of the Doctor's companions to leave him. Fraser also appeared in the notable films The Sorcerers and The French Lieutenant's Woman, amongst others.

== Early life ==
Fraser was born in Edinburgh in 1932 or 1933.

== Personal life ==
He married actress and writer Pamela Greer but they divorced a few years later.

== Filmography ==
=== Film ===
Year	Title	Role	Notes
1964	Carry On Cleo	Horsa's Companion	Uncredited
1967	The Sorcerers	Detective George	
1968	The Intrepid Mr. Twigg	Sports Car Driver	Short film
1971	Zeppelin	Marine	Uncredited
1972	Tales from the Crypt	Motorist (segment: "Reflection of Death")	Uncredited
1981	The French Lieutenant's Woman	Clerk	Uncredited

=== Television ===
Year	Title	Role	Notes
1959	Sunday Night Theatre	Man by Lake	Episode: "The Gentle Goddess"
1960	ITV Television Playhouse	Peter Marshall	Episode: "The Silk Purse"
1960	No Hiding Place	Barman	Episode: "The Final Chase"
1960	Boyd Q.C.	Peter Dalton	Episode: "One for the Road"
1960	Probation Officer	Johnny Fletcher	Episode: "Episode #2.1"
1961	Deadline Midnight	Dick Seton	10 episodes
1962	Ghost Squad	1st Youth	Episode: "The Missing People"
1962	Harpers West One	Keith Lacey	Episode: "Episode #2.4"
1962	Dr. Finlay's Casebook	Robin Gavin	Episode: "A Spotless Reputation"
1962	No Hiding Place	Shunty Rowse	Episode: "Whatever Happened to Wally?"
1963	Sergeant Cork	Sam Manners	Episode: "The Case of the Silthy Tove"
1963	The Plane Makers	Tommy Ferris	Episode: "Any More for the Skylark"
1964	Doctor Who	David Campbell	Serial: The Dalek Invasion of Earth
1964	ITV Play of the Week	PC Lomax	Episode: "Deep and Crisp and Stolen"
1964	No Hiding Place	Insp. Gordon	Episode: "Real Class"
1965	Alexander Graham Bell	Melvin-Bell	Episode: "Journey in the Air"
1965	Jury Room	John Creadie - Juror	Episode: "The Sandyford Mystery"
1965	Out of the Unknown	Donnie Chaffer	Episode: "The Counterfeit Man"
1967	Sat'Day While Sunday	Roberts	2 episodes
2003	Future Memories: Making 'The Dalek Invasion of Earth'	Himself	Documentary
2022	MindSick	David Campbell	Archive footage; 3 episodes
