= The Further It Is from Tipperary, the Closer It Is to Berlin =

Song
- Written: 1917
- Composer(s): John Godfrey
- Lyricist(s): Bide Dudley, James Byrnes

"The Further It Is from Tipperary, the Closer It Is to Berlin" is a World War I song written to capitalise on the popularity of the song "It's a Long Way to Tipperary". As suggested by the title, the song claims that distance from home is a positive because it indicates that the Allies are getting closer to victory over the German Empire. It was written in late 1917 and became a modest hit, recorded by Billy Murray for both Victor Records and Edison Records. The song may have been featured in some versions of the 1917 Broadway play Going Up.

The lyrics are in the public domain.

== Variations ==
There are variations in lyrics between early recordings and the sheet music released later in 1918. The title is changed to "The Further It Is from Tipperary, the Nearer It Is to Berlin". The very first line, "The Tommies in the tanks all seem to have one favorite song" is changed to "The Tommies in the trenches seem to have one favorite song".
