= Goodbye Piccadilly, Farewell Leicester Square =

1966 novel by Arthur La Bern

- First edition (UK)
- Author: Arthur La Bern
- Language: English
- Genre: Crime novel
- Publisher: W. H. Allen & Co. (UK); Stein & Day (US)
- Publication date: 1966
- Publication place: United Kingdom

Goodbye Piccadilly, Farewell Leicester Square is a 1966 novel by Arthur La Bern, which was the basis for Alfred Hitchcock's film Frenzy (1972).

== Plot ==
The novel and film tell the story of Bob Rusk, a serial killer in London who rapes and strangles women. Because of circumstantial evidence, however, the police come to suspect Rusk's friend Richard Blamey.

== Film adaptation ==
The novel was adapted for the screen by Anthony Shaffer. The title is taken from a line in the popular British music hall hit "It's a Long Way to Tipperary".

La Bern expressed his dissatisfaction with the adaptation in a letter to the editor of The Times.

Though the adaptation is in fact fairly faithful, there are significant differences between the original novel and Hitchcock's film. The scenes between Inspector Oxford and his wife are not in the book. In La Bern's novel, the first murder is depicted from the murderer's viewpoint, with the reader unaware of his identity. A later scene also begins from the murderer's viewpoint, but midway through the scene the narrative suddenly reveals that he is Bob Rusk.

In the novel, the man falsely convicted of the murders is named Blamey, not Blaney, and nicknamed "Blameworthy". Most significantly, while Hitchcock set his film in the 1970s, the original novel takes place in the 1960s with several references to the Second World War. Richard Blamey was a Royal Air Force veteran who had participated in the Dresden fire-bombing as "chief candle dropper": He dropped the incendiary flares that enabled the bombers to find their targets. In the novel, he feels guilty for this. Blamey is drunk and confused when the police first interrogate him about the necktie murders, and he claims to have committed previous murders in Dresden. When a police officer asks him how many people he killed in Dresden, Blamey replies "thousands". This drunken confession is a factor in his eventual false conviction for the necktie murders.

A Tamil movie remake of this story, Kalaignan, was released in 1993.
