= Arthur La Bern =

British writer (1909–1990)

- Born: 1909; Islington, England
- Died: 1990 (aged 80–81); London, England
- Occupation(s): Novelist, screenwriter

Arthur La Bern (1909–1990) was a British journalist, novelist and screenwriter, specialising in crime fiction. Four of his novels were adapted into films, including Goodbye Piccadilly, Farewell Leicester Square which was made into Alfred Hitchcock's Frenzy (1972).

== Selected novels ==
- It Always Rains on Sunday (1945)
- Night Darkens the Street (1947)
- Paper Orchid (1948)
- It Was Christmas Every Day (1952)
- Pennygreen Street (1950)
- The Big Money Box (1960)
- Brighton Belle (1963)
- It Will Be Warmer When it Snows (1966)
- Goodbye Piccadilly, Farewell Leicester Square (1966)
- A Nice Class of People (1969)

== Selected filmography ==
- Freedom to Die (1961)
- Dead Man's Evidence (1962)
- Time to Remember (1962)
- Incident at Midnight (1963)
- Accidental Death (1963)
- The Verdict (1964)

== Bibliography ==
- Goble, Alan. The Complete Index to Literary Sources in Film. Walter de Gruyter, 1999.
- Murphy, Robert. Realism and Tinsel: Cinema and Society in Britain 1939–48. Routledge, 1992.
