= Stella (1950 film) =

1950 black comedy film directed by Claude Binyon

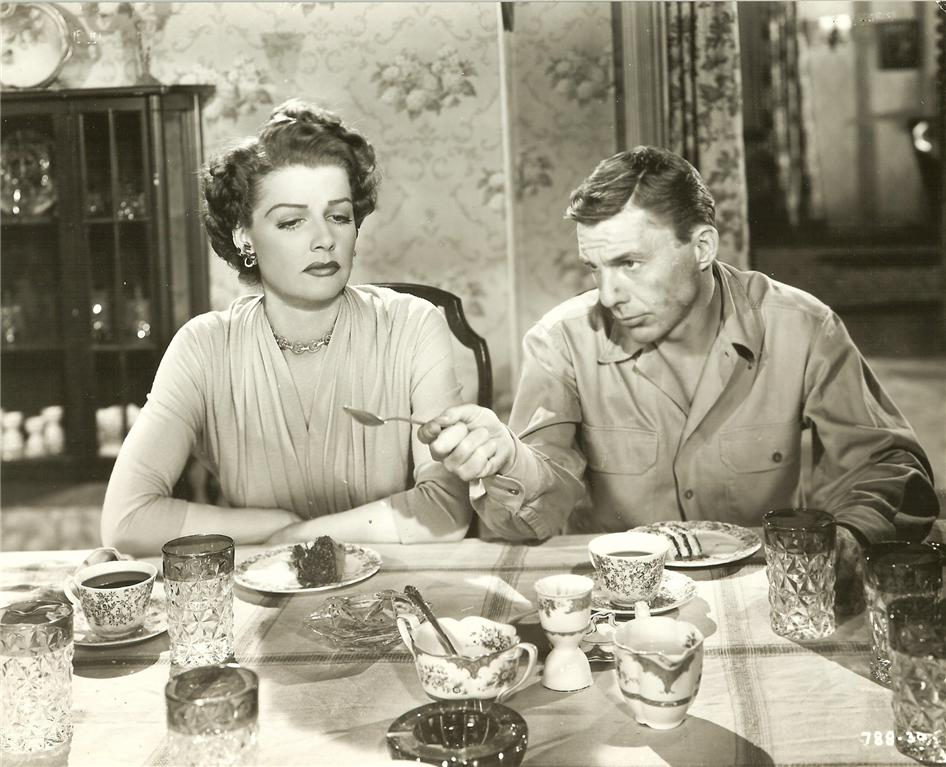
- Ann Sheridan and David Wayne in Stella
- Directed by: Claude Binyon
- Written by: Claude Binyon
- Based on: Family Skeleton by Doris Miles Disney
- Produced by: Sol C. Siegel
- Starring: Ann Sheridan; Victor Mature; David Wayne; Randy Stuart; Marion Marshall; Frank Fontaine; Leif Erickson; Evelyn Varden; Lea Penman; Joyce MacKenzie; Hobart Cavanaugh
- Cinematography: Joseph MacDonald
- Edited by: Harmon Jones
- Music by: Cyril J. Mockridge
- Color process: Black and white
- Production company: 20th Century Fox
- Distributed by: 20th Century Fox
- Release date: August 1950
- Running time: 83 minutes
- Country: United States
- Language: English

Stella is a 1950 American black comedy film directed by Claude Binyon and starring Ann Sheridan, Victor Mature and Leif Erickson.

In the film, the family of an accident victim decides to bury the corpse in secret. They want to avoid suspicions of murder.

== Plot ==
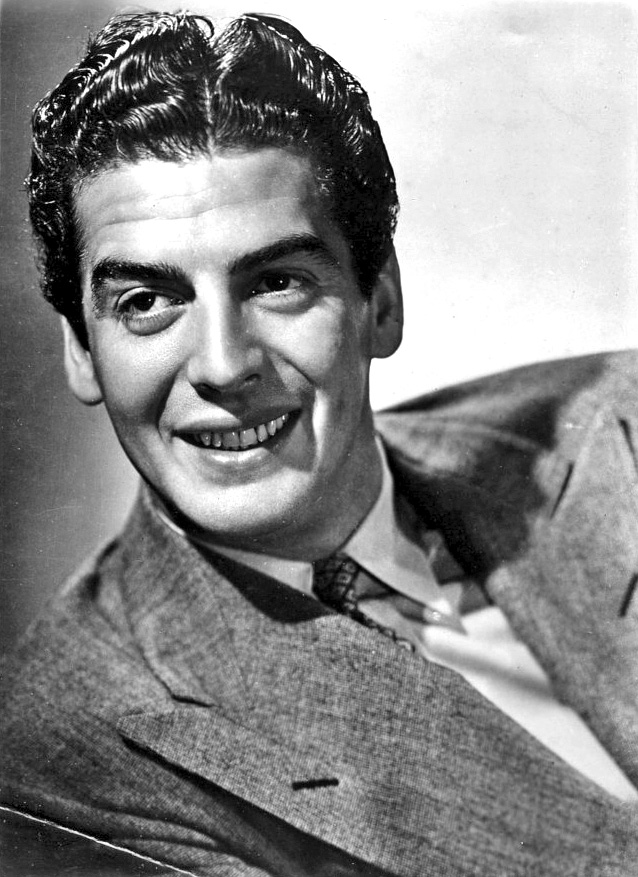
Victor Mature as Jeff De Marco

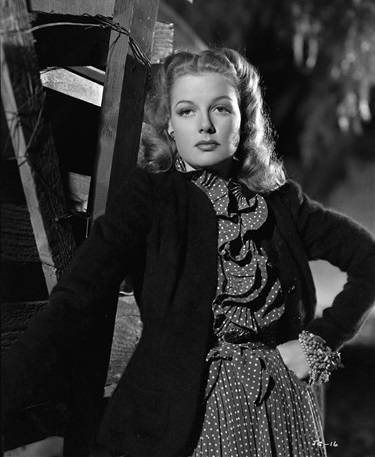
Ann Sheridan as Stella Bevins

The Bevins are an extended family living together in Grovener's Cove in Connecticut. Claire and Mary are married to Carl and Don, respectively. The two men work summers, then take the rest of the year off. A third sister, Stella, works for Commonwealth Insurance Company and is engaged to her boss, Fred Anderson Jr. Their mother, Flora, also lives in town, along with her brother Joe. The Bevins family home is a house owned by Joe.

One day, during a family picnic, a drunken Joe picks a fight with Carl, whom he hates. However, before they trade blows, Joe falls, hits his head on a rock and dies of head trauma. Fearful that the police will believe Carl murdered Joe, the Bevins family bury him in an improvised grave in the picnic area.

Jeff De Marco, a Commonwealth claims adjuster and former detective, is in town on business. He is asked by his boss to evaluate Fred for a job at the head office in New York City. Jeff invites Stella to dinner to discuss Fred, but she is not impressed by Jeff. When she gets home, Stella is told that Joe is missing. However, as he has disappeared in the past on drinking binges, she is not too concerned. Later, the household is awakened by police chief Clark and the widow Calhoun. She and Joe had planned to elope that night. Her plan after marrying Joe was to evict the Bevins family from the house.

After the chief and the widow leave, Flora tells her Joe died by accident. Stella agrees to keep their secret. The next day, a man's body is found by the train tracks, having been hit by a train. Carl and Don quickly go to the morgue and identify the body as Joe. Since Joe was insured for $20,000 with Commonwealth, fhe family files an insurance claim. Jeff becomes involved in the matter at that point. That evening, the Bevins family is arguing about how to divide the money when Jeff and the widow Calhoun stop by. They report that the dental records of the deceased man do not match Joe. Jeff suggests that they withdraw their insurance claim.

Some time later, Jeff invites Fred and Stella to attend the company convention in New York City. This would give Fred a chance to meet the hiring managers for the company. Fred meets Charlie Wright, the company's chief adjuster. He want to find a job for Fred in New York, but would like him to investigate the Joe Bevins case. During the New York visit becomes jealous of the attention Jeff is paying to Stella.

Back in Connecticut, another body is discovered on the beach. Again Carl and Don identify the corpse as Joe and arrange an elaborate $500 funeral. A worried Stella then confesses to Fred the entire story about Joe's death. He tells her that now no one will believe it was accidental. He suggests that she claim the insurance money. Soon Jeff comes back to town to investigate the latest Bevins case. At the funeral, Jeff announces that X-rays reveal that this person was also not Joe. Back at home Carl suggests they dig up Joe and leave him where a passerby can find him.

Meanwhile, Jeff and Stella have fallen in love and want to marry. When she tells Fred, he blackmails her with the truth about Joe's death. However, Jeff is eavesdropping on the conversation. He hears Stella tell Fred that Carl and Don are digging up Joe. After they leave, Jeff heads out to the site with Chief Clark.

Because it is dark, Carl and Don have difficulty locating Joe's grave. After Stella and Fred arrive, Jeff and the chief overhear Carl explain that Joe's death was an accident. After they are surprised by Jeff and the chief, Carl and Don are ordered to keep digging until they find Joe.

The two men finally exhume a body and it is transported to the coroner's office He calls the chief later to report that this body was that of a female Native American. Although cleared of suspicion in Joe's death, Jeff suggests that Carl and Don keep digging until they find Joe. Jeff and Stella leave town to get married.

== Cast ==
- Ann Sheridan as Stella Bevans
- Victor Mature as Jeff DeMarco
- Leif Erickson as Fred Anderson Jr.
- David Wayne as Carl Granger
- Randy Stuart as Claire
- Marion Marshall as Mary
- Frank Fontaine as Don
- Evelyn Varden as Flora
- Lea Penman as Mrs. Calhoun
- Joyce MacKenzie as Peggy Denny
- Hobart Cavanaugh as Tim Gross

== Production ==
The novel Family Skeleton by Doris Miles Disney was published in 1949. The New York Times described the book as "half humorous... not a mystery, hardly even a murder novel, and certainly not the light farce suggested by the publisher's grinning skull symbol." Jeff de Marco appeared in Disney's Straw Man in 1951.

The film was known as Stella and the City Man. Susan Hayward was meant to play the title role but refused and was put on suspension. Ann Sheridan replaced her. Filming started in March 1950.

Stella was Hobart Cavanaugh's last film; he knew he did not have long to live and collapsed twice on set, but was determined to see it through.

== Critical reception ==
The New York Times wrote "With a good cast, including David Wayne and Ann Sheridan; dialogue which is generally bright and often quite satirical, Mr. Binyon has put together a surprisingly funny show."The film was a box office disappointment.
