= Dark Road =

Dark Road may refer to:

- Dark Road (novel), a 1946 mystery novel by Doris Miles Disney
- Dark Road (play), a 2013 play by Ian Rankin
- "Dark Road", a 2007 song by Annie Lennox
- "Dark Road", a 2013 song from the album Build Me Up from Bones by Sarah Jarosz
- "Dark Road" (2012), Longmire, season 1, episode 2
- Kingdom Hearts Dark Road, a 2020 mobile game
