= Straw Man (novel) =

1951 novel by Doris Miles Disney

- First edition
- Author: Doris Miles Disney
- Language: English
- Genre: Thriller
- Publisher: Doubleday
- Publication date: 1951
- Publication place: United States
- Media type: Print

Straw Man is a 1951 mystery thriller novel by the American writer Doris Miles Disney.

== Adaptation ==
It served as the basis for the 1953 British film The Straw Man starring Dermot Walsh and Lana Morris.

== Bibliography ==
- Goble, Alan. The Complete Index to Literary Sources in Film. Walter de Gruyter, 1999.
