= Fugitive Lady (1950 film) =

- Directed by: Sidney Salkow; Marino Girolami (Uncredited)
- Written by: John O'Dea
- Based on: Dark Road by Doris Miles Disney
- Produced by: M.J. Frankovich
- Starring: Janis Paige; Binnie Barnes; Massimo Serato
- Cinematography: Tonino Delli Colli
- Edited by: Nino Baragli
- Music by: Victor Damiante
- Distributed by: Scalera Film (Italy); Republic Pictures (United States–Original); Viacom (United States–Current)
- Release dates: 8 May 1950 (Italy); 15 July 1951 (United States)
- Running time: 78 minutes
- Countries: Italy; United Kingdom
- Language: English

Fugitive Lady, Italian: La strada buia, is a 1950 crime–drama film directed by Sidney Salkow and Marino Girolami (Uncredited). It stars Janis Paige, Binnie Barnes, and Massimo Serato. Fugitive Lady is based on the novel Dark Road by Doris Miles Disney. Film editing was done by Nino Baragli. It was shot at the Scalera Studios in Rome.

== Plot ==
Wealthy industrialist Ralph Clementi (Eduardo Ciannelli) leaves a tavern in a drunken state. Driving his car near Rome, he comes close to Lake Nemi. Not noticing the broken road, he plunges into a ravine and dies. His wife Barbara (Janis Paige) would collect £100,000 from his life insurance.

Insurance investigator Jack Di Marco (Tony Cento), at the instigation of Ralph's half-sister Esther (Binnie Barnes), looks into the history of Ralph and Barbara. Esther appears detached from her sister-in-law and asserts that her grief is pretense.

Jack learns that Esther secretly harbored feelings for her half-brother, now no longer young, but Ralph was in love with Barbara, a nightclub singer, and married her. Over time, Barbara lost affection for her husband and had returned to her former lover, Jim West (Massimo Serato). Discovered by Ralph, she tried to get a divorce from him, but he refused.

Unable to separate from him legally, she decided to get rid of him. On a stormy night, she led a drunk Ralph to his car, and switched two road signs to cause the accident.

Jim is unaware of this until an admission by the caretaker of the Clementi villa reveals that Barbara planned the accident. Disgusted by her perfidy, he rejects her, and she shoots him to death from behind. At the sight of Jack, who secretly witnessed the murder, Barbara flees from the villa by car, but is killed in a crash in the same way as her husband.

== Cast ==
- Janis Paige as Barbara Clementi
- Binnie Barnes as Esther Clementi
- Massimo Serato as Jim West
- Eduardo Ciannelli as Ralph Clementi
- Tony Cento as Jack De Marco
- Alba Arnova as Francine
- Dino Galvani as Giuseppe
- Rosina Galli as Teresa
- John Fostini as Beppo
- Luciana Danieli as Maria
- Michael Tor as Bob
- Alex Serberoli as Chauffeur
- Joop van Hulsen as Druggist
- Giulio Marchetti as Giovanni

== Reception ==
=== Critical response ===
The New York Times staff wrote in a review of Fugitive Lady: "Mr. Frankovitch has unwound this meandering claptrap, which is recounted in an interminable series of flashbacks by practically everybody in the cast, against the eye-popping magnificence of Rome's cafe society playground. John O'Dea has pounded out a laboriously one-dimensional scenario, Sidney Salkow's direction is vacuous and fumbling and the cast responds accordingly. As the passion-blinded spouse, Eduardo Ciannelli grits his teeth and grins like an agonized possum. Binnie Barnes, who is also Mrs. Frankovitch, does a stiff but at least restrained job as his protecting sister. And Massimo Serato makes an honest but unsustained try as the gigolo. But Miss Paige, who ranges from Louisa M. Alcott demureness to snarling tantrums, takes the cake for water-level histrionics. Just why Mr. Frankovitch bothered with such a diabolically dull heroine is anyone's guess. Maybe Doris Miles Disney, who wrote the original novel, knows. At any rate, somebody should have opened a window to let in some more air—and scenery."
