= John Beradino =

American baseball player and actor (1917–1996)

Johnny Berardino
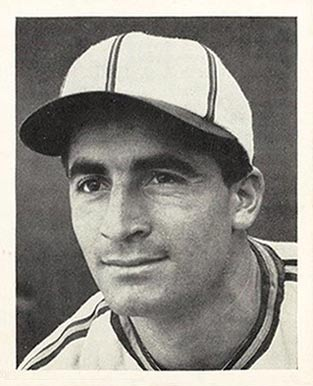
- Second baseman / Shortstop
- Born: Giovanni Berardino; May 1, 1917; Los Angeles, California, U.S.
- Died: May 19, 1996 (aged 79); Los Angeles, California, U.S.
- Batted: Right Threw: Right

MLB debut
- April 22, 1939, for the St. Louis Browns

Last MLB appearance
- September 19, 1952, for the Pittsburgh Pirates

MLB statistics
- Batting average: .249
- Home runs: 36
- Runs batted in: 387
- Stats at Baseball Reference

Teams
- St. Louis Browns (1939–1942, 1946–1947); Cleveland Indians (1948–1950); Pittsburgh Pirates (1950); St. Louis Browns (1951); Cleveland Indians (1952); Pittsburgh Pirates (1952)
Education	USC
Occupations	Actor, baseball player
Years active	1939–1996
Known for	Steve Hardy (General Hospital)
Spouses	Jeanette Nadine Barritt (m. 1941; div. 1955) Charissa Hughes (née Veronica Contos Patton) (m. 1961; death 1963) Marjorie Binder (m. 1971)
Children	4

John Beradino (born Giovanni Berardino, May 1, 1917 – May 19, 1996) was an American Major League Baseball infielder and actor. Known as Johnny Berardino during his baseball career, he was also credited during his acting career as John Berardino, John Baradino, John Barardino or John Barradino.

== Early life and education ==
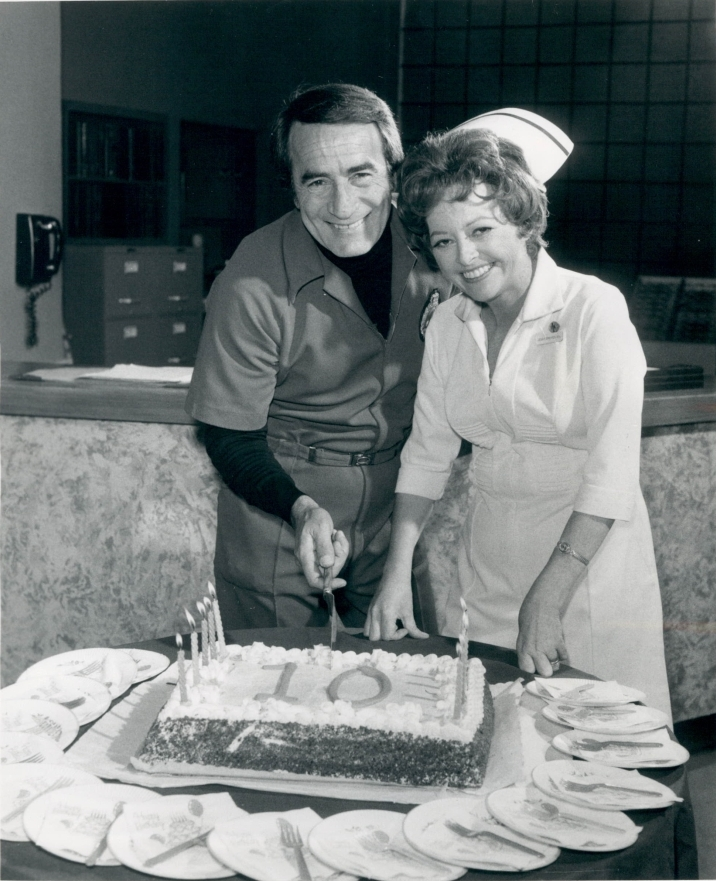
Publicity photo for the 10th Anniversary of General Hospital, 1973

Beradino was born on May 1, 1917 in Los Angeles and was raised near Hollywood. He attended Belmont High School in downtown Los Angeles. Beradino won a football scholarship to the University of Southern California in 1936, but he soon switched to baseball.

Although Beradino is sometimes believed to have appeared in the silent Our Gang comedies as a child actor, he has not been identified as having appeared in any of the existing films.

== Career ==
=== Baseball ===
After attending the University of Southern California, where he played baseball under coach Sam Barry and was member of Phi Kappa Tau fraternity, Beradino was a major league player from 1939 to 1952, except for three years of military service in the U.S. Naval Reserve during World War II from 1942 to 1945. He played for the St. Louis Browns, Cleveland Indians and Pittsburgh Pirates, winning the World Series with the Indians in 1948. While primarily a middle infielder, playing second baseman or shortstop, he also played first and third base.

After injuring his leg and being released by Pittsburgh in 1952, he retired from baseball and returned to acting, having appeared in his first film in 1948.

=== Acting ===
Beradino appeared briefly in an uncredited role as a state trooper in the 1954 thriller Suddenly, starring Frank Sinatra and Sterling Hayden, and later performed as a policeman who allows Roger Thornhill (Cary Grant) to make a phone call to his mother in the 1959 Hitchcock thriller North by Northwest.

Beradino (still billed as John Berardino) played a cameo role in the 1954 sci-fi thriller Them!. He also appeared in a 1956 episode of the television series Adventures of Superman titled "The Unlucky Number" as a small-time criminal struggling to reform.

Beradino appeared twice on the Western series Annie Oakley: as Gorman in "Annie Rides the Navajo Trail" and as Roscoe Barnes in "Amateur Outlaw" (both 1956). He appeared as an outlaw in the opening scenes of Budd Boetticher's Seven Men From Now in 1956. He guest-starred on John Bromfield's syndicated crime drama with a modern Western setting, The Sheriff of Cochise, and Bromfield's successor series, U.S. Marshal. He was also cast in an episode of David Janssen's crime drama series Richard Diamond, Private Detective.

Beradino played a minor gangster in The Untouchables pilot that originally aired as an installment in the Westinghouse Desilu Playhouse. He then played the recurring role of gangster Augie Viale in two episodes from the first season of The Untouchables series, "The Jake Lingle Killing" and "One-Armed Bandits".

On December 2, 1959, Beradino appeared in the episode "The Third Strike" of the syndicated adventure series Rescue 8, playing a professional baseball player who loses consciousness when struck by a wild pitch and awakens with short-term amnesia.

After appearing in more than a dozen B-movies, as well as in supporting roles on the series I Led Three Lives and The New Breed, he was offered the role of Dr. Steve Hardy on the soap opera General Hospital. Beradino also played a version of his General Hospital character on an episode of The Fresh Prince of Bel-Air.

== Recognition ==
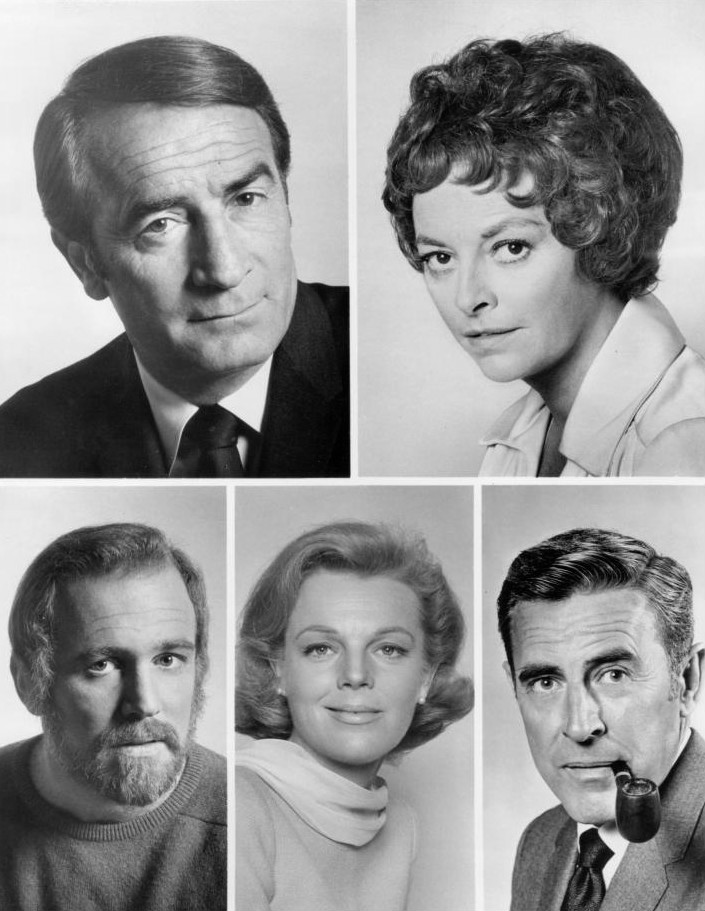
Cast of General Hospital 1973 (top): John Beradino, Emily McLaughlin (bottom): Martin West, Rachel Ames, Peter Hansen

For his contribution to the television industry, Beradino has a star on the Hollywood Walk of Fame at 6801 Hollywood Blvd. He has also been inducted into the University of Southern California Athletic Hall of Fame.

He is the only person to have won a World Series (1948) and have his star on the Hollywood Walk of Fame (1993).

Beradino received three Daytime Emmy Award nominations for best actor in a daytime drama.

In tribute, General Hospital left Beradino's image with that of Rachel Ames in its opening sequence for more than a year after his death, through several updates. His image was finally removed in early 1998, but an action clip of Beradino's character remained in the sequence until its 2004 retirement.

== Personal life and death ==
Beradino had two children, Toni and Cindy from his first marriage, and two children, Katherine Ann and John Anthony from his second marriage. He was married to his third wife, Marjorie, at the time of his death.

Beradino was diagnosed with pancreatic cancer in 1996 and died later that year, aged 79, on May 19, 1996 in his Los Angeles home.

Beradino supported Barry Goldwater in the 1964 United States presidential election.

== Filmography ==
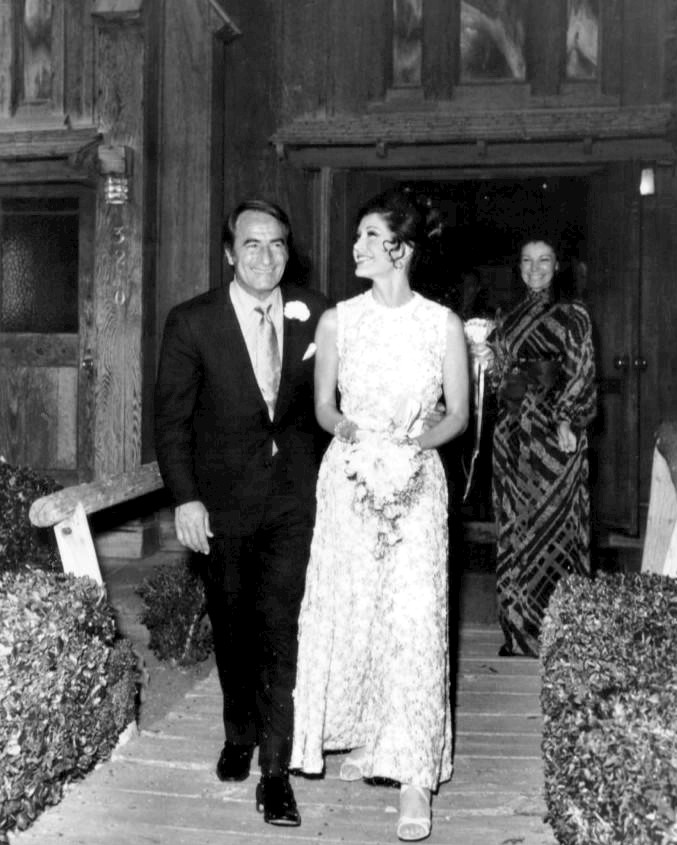
John and Marjorie Beradino, 1971.

=== Film ===
Year	Title	Role	Notes
1948	The Winner's Circle	Trainer	
1949	The Kid from Cleveland	Mac	
1951	Francis Goes to the Races	S.C. White	uncredited
1952	The Winning Team	Sherdel	uncredited
1953	Powder River	Dealer	uncredited
1953	The Kid from Left Field	Hank Dreiser	
1954	The Command	Sergeant Major	uncredited
1954	Suddenly	Trooper	directed by Lewis Allen; uncredited
1954	Them!	Patrolman Ryan	directed by Gordon Douglas; uncredited
1954	The Raid	Yankee Soldier Buying Cigars	uncredited
1954	Shield for Murder	Gambler Being Booked	uncredited
1954	Suddenly	Trooper	uncredited
1954	The Bamboo Prison	Progressive	uncredited
1955	East of Eden	Coalman at Lettuce Field	uncredited
1955	Marty	Man in Bar	uncredited
1955	The McConnell Story	Engineer	uncredited
1955	Illegal	Scott's Client	uncredited
1956	The Killer Is Loose	Mac	
1956	Behind the High Wall	Carl Burkhardt	
1956	Seven Men from Now	Clint	
1956	Emergency Hospital	Policeman at Accident	uncredited
1958	The World Was His Jury	Tony Armand	
1958	Wild Heritage	Arn	
1958	The Naked and the Dead	Capt. Mantelli	
1959	North by Northwest	Sergeant Emile Klinger	directed by Alfred Hitchcock; uncredited
1960	Seven Thieves	Chief of Detectives	
1961	The Right Approach	Rod	directed by David Butler; uncredited
1982	Young Doctors in Love	Soap Cameos	directed by Garry Marshall

=== Television ===
Year	Title	Role	Notes
1954	I Led Three Lives	Special Agent Steven Daniels	recurring from 1954 to 1956
1956	The Sheriff of Cochise	Walt Harris	episode: "Deputy's Wife" (S 2:Ep 6)
1956	Annie Oakley	Gorman	episode: "Annie Rides the Navajo Trail"(S 3:Ep 25)
1956	Adventures of Superman	Dexter Brown	episode: "The Unlucky Number" (S 4:Ep 2)
1956	Annie Oakley	Henchman Roscoe Barnes	episode: "Amateur Outlaw" (S 3:Ep 28)
1957	Richard Diamond, Private Detective	Marty Stopka	episode: "The Torch Carriers" (S 1:Ep 9)
1958	Tombstone Territory	Frank Leslie	episode: "Shoot Out at Dark" (S 1, Ep 13)
1958	Tales of Wells Fargo	Kendall	episode: "The Counterfeiters" (S 3"Ep 13
1958	Sea Hunt	Athlete Father Dave Crane	episode: "The Lost Ones", S 1, Episode 28
1959	Have Gun - Will Travel	Nelson Pike	episode: "Juliet" ( S 2:Ep 20)
1959	Rescue 8	Al	episode: "The Third Strike" ( S 2:Ep 11)
1959	Bronco	Turk Hansen	episode: "The Belles of Silver Flat" (S 1:Ep 14)
1959	The Untouchables	Johnny Giannini, Augie Viale	episode 1: pilot, Episodes 3 and 17
1959	The Texan	Duke Ellis	episode: "The Marshal of Yellow Jacket"
1960	U.S. Marshal	Carl Tabor	episode: "Backfire" (S 2:Ep 25)
1960	Lawman	Walt Carmody	episode: "Dilemma" (S 3:Ep 7)
1960	Checkmate	Floyd Venner	episode: "The Dark Divide" (S 1:Ep 9)
1961	Tales of Wells Fargo	Virgil McCready	episode: "Border Renegades" (S 5:Ep 15)
1961	Route 66	Police Lieutenant Fielding	episode: "Sleep on Four Pillows: (S 1:Ep 18)
1961	Dante	Phil Diamond	episode: "Not as a Canary" (S 1:Ep 20)
1961	Coronado 9	Andre Machado	episode: "Caribbean Chase" (S 1:Ep 24)
1961	Michael Shayne	Danny Fleck	episode: "The Body Beautiful" (S 1:Ep 25)
1961	Coronado 9	Will	episode: "Excursion to Algiers" (S 1:Ep 26)
1961	Miami Undercover	Tom Dane	episode: "The Tom Dane Story" (S 1:Ep 11)
1961	Surfside 6	Granger	episode: "Circumstantial Evidence" (S 1:Ep 29)
1961	The Brothers Brannagan	Don Girard	episode: "Treasure Hunt" (S 1:Ep 33)
1961	Whispering Smith	Claude Denton	episode: "The Mortal Coil" (S 1:Ep 12); credited as John Berardino
1961	The New Breed	Sgt. Vince Cavelli	
1961	Cain's Hundred	Al Krajac	episode: "Crime and Commitment: Part 1" (S 1:Ep 1–Pilot)
1961	Bronco	Ross Kinkaid	episode: "The Cousin from Atlanta" (S 4:Ep 1)
1963	General Hospital	Steve Hardy	from 1963 to 1996
1968	Batman	Doctor	episode: "Penguin's Clean Sweep" (S 3:Ep 20)
1968	One Life to Live	Steve Hardy	1 episode; crossover appearance
1971	Do Not Fold, Spindle or Mutilate	Det. Hallum	directed by Ted Post and the screenplay adapted by John D.F. Black from a novel of the same name by Doris Miles Disney.
1972	Moon of the Wolf	Dr. Druten	directed by Daniel Petrie
1978	A Guide for the Married Woman	Doctor	directed by Hy Averback
1981	The Love Boat	Dr. Cotts	episode: "Black Sheep/Hometown Doc/Clothes Make the Girl" (S 4:Ep 21)
1981	Don't Look Back: The Story of Leroy 'Satchel' Paige	Jake Wells	directed by Richard A. Colla and based on Leroy's autobiography Don't Look Back: Satchel Paige in the Shadows of Baseball.
1992	The Fresh Prince of Bel-Air	Dr. Harding	episode: "Ill Will" (S 2:Ep 18)
