= Voice from the Grave =

Voice from the Grave may refer to:

- Voice from the Grave (film), a 1996 television film
- The Sin of Nora Moran, a 1933 American pre-Code film, reissued as Voice from the Grave
- Voice from the Grave (novel), a 1968 mystery novel by Doris Miles Disney
