= Randy Stuart =

American actress (1924–1996)

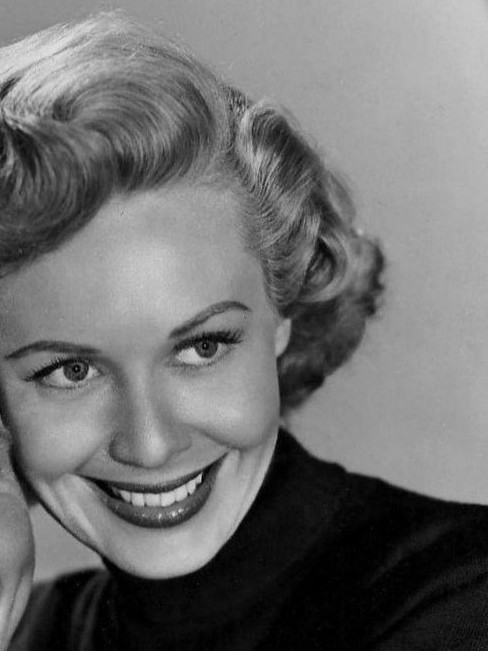
- Stuart in Biff Baker, U.S.A., 1952.
- Born: Elizabeth Shaubell; October 12, 1924; Iola, Kansas, U.S.
- Died: July 20, 1996 (aged 71); Bakersfield, California, U.S.
- Occupation: Actress
- Years active: 1947–1975
- Spouses: Kenneth W. Smith (m. 1943; div. 1945) Edward Charles George (m. 1947; div. 1954) Lane Allen (m. 1954; div. 1968) Ernest Dineen Wallis (m. 1971; died 1982)
- Children: 4

Randy Stuart (born Elizabeth Shaubell; October 12, 1924 – July 20, 1996), was an American film and television actress. She appeared in several films in the 1940s and 1950s, and later in Western-themed television series. She played Louise Carey, the wife of protagonist Scott Carey in The Incredible Shrinking Man (1957).

== Early years ==
Stuart's parents, John and Gladys Shaubell, were itinerant musicians in the American South and the Middle West. She was born in Iola in Allen County in southeastern Kansas, and made her stage debut at the age of three.

The Shaubells relocated to Compton, California, where Stuart went to high school and Compton Junior College.

== Radio ==
Stuart was a regular on The Jack Carson Show in 1946.

== Film ==
Stuart played the birth mother of main character Stephen Fox in The Foxes of Harrow's initial scene.

In 1948, she played Peggy in the comedy Sitting Pretty. In 1949, she portrayed Lieutenant Eloise Billings in the Howard Hawks film I Was a Male War Bride. That same year, she appeared in Otto Preminger's Whirlpool. Stuart was a supporting role in the musical comedy Dancing in the Dark.

In 1950, Stuart was briefly seen in that year's Best Picture, All About Eve, as a co-conspirator/fellow boarding house resident of Anne Baxter's malevolent character, Eve Harrington. (The same film featured Marilyn Monroe, a classmate of Stuart from dance training at Fox.) Stuart had fourth billing in Stella, with Ann Sheridan and Victor Mature.

In 1951, she appeared as Marge Boyd in I Can Get It For You Wholesale. In 1952, Stuart was part of the comedy Room for One More for Warner Bros.

For Star in the Dust (1956), one of the scenes featured co-star Coleen Gray and Stuart fighting for possession of incriminating letters hidden in a suitcase. The seasoned actresses invited their husbands to watch the filming of the action scene, which lasted over 50 seconds of screen time and included both women punching and wrestling each other. At the conclusion of the choreographed scene, Gray recalled in a later interview, the women simply dusted themselves off, but the two husbands "were pale and clammy and weak in the knees," having watched their wives engage in a lengthy fistfight.

After 1957's Incredible Shrinking Man, she was cast as Nancy Dawson in the 1958 Western film, Man from God's Country, starring George Montgomery. She also guest-starred about that time in Montgomery's short-lived Western television series, Cimarron City.

== Television ==
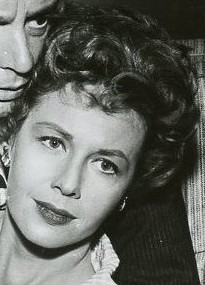
Stuart in 1960

Stuart appeared on television throughout her film career in the early 1950s. Her first major role was co-starring as Louise Baker, the wife of Cold War spy Alan Hale Jr., in the 26-episode filmed adventure series Biff Baker, U.S.A., which aired on CBS in the 1952-53 season (and was recently released on DVD). In October 1953, she co-starred with Richard Conte in the Ford Theatre production "Emergency."

Following her last film role in 1958, Stuart appeared for several years in TV dramas (usually Westerns), most of them produced by Warner Bros. Television for the ABC network. In 1959 and 1960, Stuart had a recurring role as Nellie Cashman in 11 episodes of the ABC series The Life and Legend of Wyatt Earp, with Hugh O'Brian in the title role of Marshal Wyatt Earp. Nellie was briefly a romantic interest for Earp.

From 1958 to 1961, Stuart guest-starred four times on Clint Walker's ABC/Warner Bros. Western Cheyenne, including a role opposite Robert Colbert in the 1960 episode "Two Trails to Santa Fe". In another 1960 role, she played the mentally unbalanced Claire Russo in the episode "Tangled Trail" of Ty Hardin's ABC/WB series, Bronco, which rotated with Cheyenne. Her other Western appearances were on Lawman (two appearances), Cimarron City, Colt .45, and with Robert Colbert again in an episode of Maverick titled "Benefit of Doubt".

Her non-Western appearances included the ABC/WB dramas 77 Sunset Strip (as Lucy Norton in the 1962 Cold War-themed episode "The Reluctant Spy", opposite Efrem Zimbalist Jr.), Bourbon Street Beat, The Roaring 20s, One Step Beyond, and Hawaiian Eye (two appearances). She also guest-starred on CBS fantasy-drama The Millionaire.

Stuart's NBC roles included an episode of top-rated Bonanza, "The Duke", directed by Robert Altman and first aired in March 1961, in which she played a saloon girl called Marge Fuller. Earlier, she appeared twice on the 1955-56 NBC comedy It's a Great Life, with Frances Bavier. After a hiatus of five years from television, Stuart returned in 1967 and 1968 as Eileen Gannon, wife of Harry Morgan's character Officer Bill Gannon on NBC's popular Dragnet. Her final TV appearance was as Miss Kallman in the 1975 episode "The Covenant" of ABC's Marcus Welby, M.D., with Robert Young in the title role.

== Later years ==
In the late 1970s and early 1980s, Stuart (known by her married name, Betty Wallis) was instrumental in developing the alumni program at Chaminade College Preparatory School in West Hills, California, from which her two youngest children had graduated. She was listed as a resource for information for the school. She later was director of alumni affairs at Cal State Northridge.

== Personal life and death ==
Stuart was married to Kenneth Wayne Smith (1943-1945), Edward Charles George (1947-1954; one child), Lane Allan (aka Albert Wootten, 1954-1968; three children), and Ernest Dineen Wallis (1971-1982). The first three marriages ended in divorce, and the last ended with Wallis's death.

Stuart died of lung cancer on July 20, 1996, at the age of 71 in Bakersfield, California.

== Filmography ==
Year	Title	Role	Notes
1947	The Foxes of Harrow	Mrs. Fox	Uncredited
1948	Sitting Pretty	Peggy	
1948	The Street with No Name	Helen Jennings	Uncredited
1948	Apartment for Peggy	Dorothy	
1949	The Fan	American Girl	
1949	I Was a Male War Bride	Lt. Eloise Billings	
1949	Whirlpool	Miss Landau	Uncredited
1949	Dancing in the Dark	Rosalie Brooks	
1950	Stella	Claire	
1950	All About Eve	Girl	
1951	I Can Get It for You Wholesale	Marge Boyd	
1952	Room for One More	Gladys Foreman	
1956	Star in the Dust	Nan Hogan	
1957	Incredible Shrinking Man	Louise Carey	
1958	Man from God's Country	Nancy Dawson	
