= Biff Baker, U.S.A. (TV series) =

American 1950s TV show

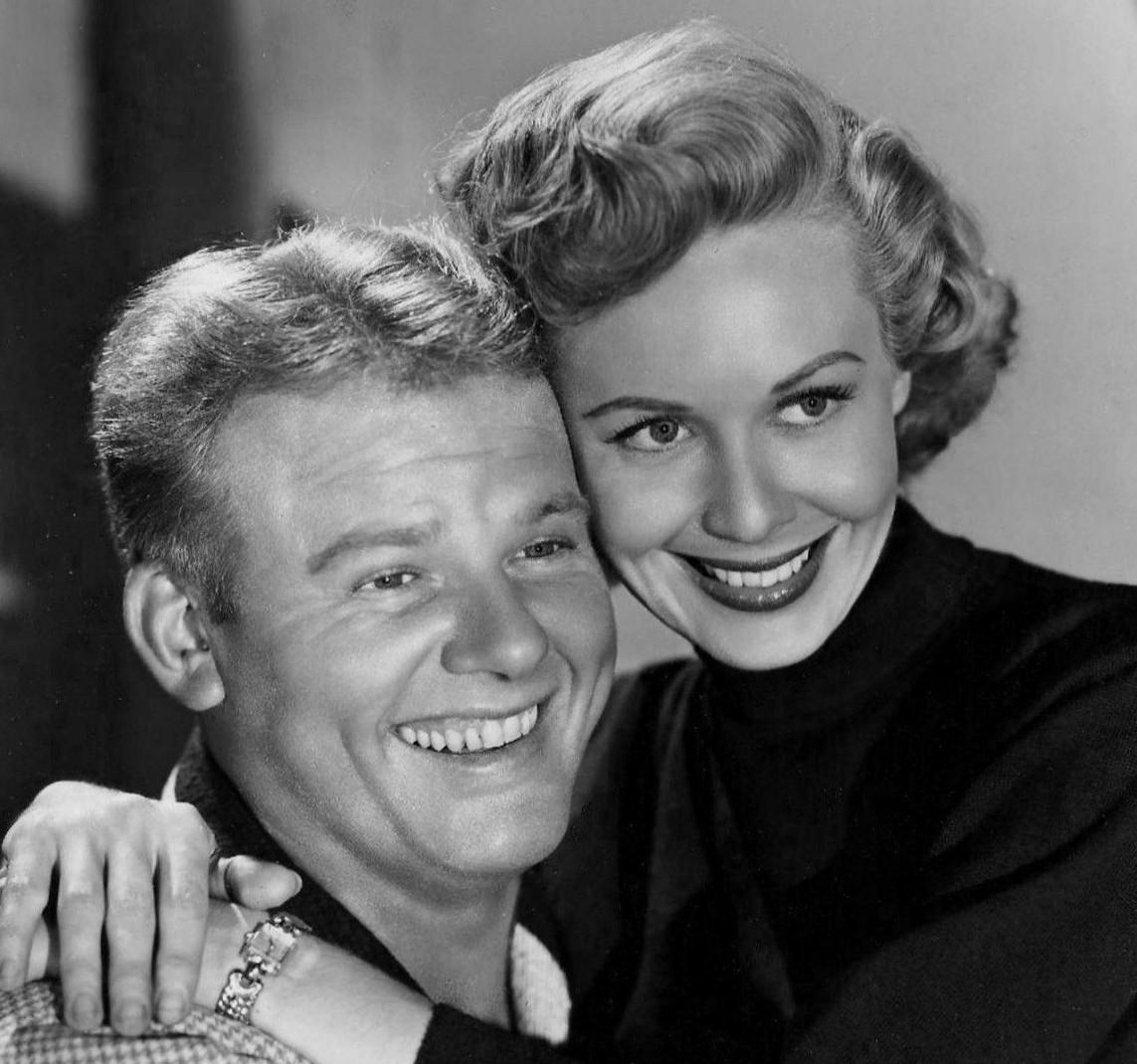
- Alan Hale Jr. and Randy Stuart in Biff Baker, U.S.A. in 1952
- Genre: Adventure
- Written by: Frank Burt; Fenton Earnaham
- Directed by: Richard Irving; Robert G. Walker
- Starring: Alan Hale Jr. Randy Stuart
- Country of origin: United States
- Original language: English
- No. of seasons: 1
- No. of episodes: 26 (5 unaired)

Production
- Producer: Alan Miller
- Running time: 30 minutes
- Production company: Revue Studios

Original release
- Network: CBS
- Release: November 6, 1952 – March 26, 1953

Biff Baker, U.S.A. is an American adventure television program starring Alan Hale Jr. in the title role and Randy Stuart as his wife, Louise. The series was broadcast on CBS from November 6, 1952, until March 26, 1953. After the show's network run ended, it was syndicated, with reruns being broadcast until late in the 1950s. Lucky Strike cigarettes sponsored the program.

== Premise ==
As the operator of an importing business, Biff Baker traveled around the world with Louise to find merchandise. They usually became involved with international intrigue of some kind, often related to spying. Baker did not look for trouble, but trouble usually found him. The Bakers' travels enabled the use of a variety of locales for episodes, with a different setting each week, "ranging from Paris to Pakistan and from Saigon to Istanbul.

Some sources say that the Bakers were spies who posed as businesspeople.

== Critical response ==
Leon Morse, writing in the trade publication Billboard, found the program's November 6 episode "another thriller, similar to many of its kind, but with two personable leads ...". He wrote that the production's quality was high, but the episode lacked sufficient suspense, and "The characters and the scenes were written on a juvenile level."

Newspaper columnist Hal Humphrey found flaws in the program, based on the first two episodes. He noted that Baker was so busy with his spying activity that he had little time left for his business, and he found fault with the sometimes silly conversations between the Bakers. He wrote that the characters were "portrayed in such a namby-pamby manner that the viewer finds himself not really caring whether they escape from their predicament or not."

== Production ==
Richard Irving was the director of Biff Baker, U.S.A.. Frank Burt and Fenton Earnaham were the writers. The program was produced by Alan Miller at Revue Studios. Of the 26 episodes filmed, 21 were shown on CBS in the initial run.
