= Nora Denney =

American actress (1927–2005)

- Nora Denney in Bewitched, 1966
- Born: Dolores Teachenor; September 3, 1927; Kansas City, Missouri, U.S.
- Died: November 20, 2005 (aged 78); Crestline, California, U.S.
- Other name: Dodo Denney
- Occupation: Actress
- Years active: 1959–1999
- Spouse: Alan Denney (m. 1952; died 1995)
- Children: 2

Nora Denney (born Dolores Teachenor; September 3, 1927 – November 20, 2005), also credited as Dodo Denney, was an American character actress, best known for playing supporting roles and small parts in films and guest roles in TV series. She is perhaps best known for her part as school teacher Mrs. Teevee in Willy Wonka & the Chocolate Factory (1971).

== Career ==
Denney was born in 1927 and started her show business career in Kansas City when she was hired by local television station KCMO-TV (now KCTV) to play "Marilyn the Witch", an onscreen host for horror movies.

She performed in guest parts in many television series, including Green Acres, Petticoat Junction, Bewitched, Hart to Hart, Get Smart, Room 222 and That Girl.

Her film credits include Who's Minding the Mint? (1967), I Walk the Line (1970), Do Not Fold, Spindle or Mutilate (1971), I Wonder Who's Killing Her Now? (1975), American Hot Wax (1978) and Truman (1995).

She played English school teacher Mrs. TeeVee in Willy Wonka and the Chocolate Factory in 1971 and appeared in the film Splash in 1984.

She made her final film appearance in 1999 in Ang Lee's Ride with the Devil.

== Personal life and death ==
She was married to Alan Denney, an art director and illustrator for Hallmark Greeting Cards. While the couple raised their two sons, Dix and John, founders of the Los Angeles-based punk rock band The Weirdos, she became a film and television character actress.

Denney retired in 1999 and died of cancer on November 20, 2005, aged 78.

== Filmography ==
Year	Title	Role	Notes
1964	The New Phil Silvers Show	Agnes (as Dodo Denney)	Season 1, Episode 15; "Beauty and the Least"
1966	A Fine Madness	Waitress	Uncredited
1966	That Girl	Mrs. Morrisey (as Dodo Denny)	Season 1, Episode 8; "Little Auction Annie"
1967	Who's Minding the Mint?	Bertha	
1967	Green Acres	Switchboard Operator (as Dodo Denney)	Season 3, Episode 9; "The Thing"
1968	Bewitched	Mrs. Gurney (as Dodo Denney)	Season 5, Episode 9; "Samantha Fights City Hall"
1969	Green Acres	Operator	Season 4, Episode 20; "Retreat From Washington"
1969	Mayberry R.F.D.	Gwen (as Dodo Denney)	Season 2, Episode 4; "Goober and the Telephone Girl"
1970	Petticoat Junction	Mrs. Graham (as Dodo Denney)	Season 7, Episode 26; "Betty Jo's Business" (series finale)
1970	I Walk the Line	Darlene Hunnicutt	
1971	Willy Wonka & the Chocolate Factory	Doris Teavee (as Dodo Denney)	
1971	Do Not Fold, Spindle or Mutilate	Trudy	TV movie
1975	I Wonder Who's Killing Her Now?	Theater Ticket Clerk	
1975	Starsky & Hutch	Ray	Season 1, Episode 2; "Texas Longhorn"
1975	Phyllis	President (as Dodo Denney)	Season 1, Episode 12; "So Lonely I Could Cry"
1978	American Hot Wax	Louise's Mom	
1980	The Gong Show Movie	Tourist Lady	
1981	Force: Five		
1982	Hart to Hart	Nurse Keyes	Season 4, Episode 4; "Harts On Campus"
1984	Splash	Ms. Stein	
1990	Mr. and Mrs. Bridge	Second Bridge Player	
1995	Truman	Mama Truman	TV movie
1999	Ride with the Devil	Elderly Woman	(final film role)
