= Man from God's Country =

1958 film by Paul Landres

- Directed by: Paul Landres
- Written by: George Waggner (george waGGner)
- Produced by: Scott R. Dunlap
- Starring: George Montgomery; Randy Stuart
- Cinematography: Henry Neumann
- Edited by: George White
- Music by: Marlin Skiles
- Color process: Color by Deluxe
- Production company: Scott R. Dunlap Productions
- Distributed by: Allied Artists Pictures
- Release date: February 8, 1958
- Running time: 72 minutes
- Country: United States
- Language: English

Man from God's Country is a 1958 American CinemaScope Western film. It was written by George Waggner (credited as "george waGGner"), directed by Paul Landres and starred George Montgomery and Randy Stuart.

== Plot ==
Dan Beattie gives up his job to move further west and rejoin his old war buddy Curt Warren in the town of Sundown. At first mistaken for a railroad agent by Beau Santee, a Sundown businessman who wants to keep the railroad away from his town, Dan is nearly killed by Santee's henchman, Mark Faber. Dan discovers that his old pal Curt works for Santee. Even after learning Dan's true identity, Santee considers him trouble and plots to get rid of him. With the help of Curt's son Stony, Dan tries to get Curt to take a stand on the right side of the law.

== Cast ==
- George Montgomery as Dan Beattie
- Randy Stuart as Nancy Dawson
- Gregg Barton as Colonel Miller
- Kim Charney as Stoney Warren
- Susan Cummings as Mary Jo Ellis
- James Griffith as Mark Faber
- House Peters Jr. as Curt Warren
- Phillip Terry as Sheriff
- Frank Wilcox as Beau Santee
- Al Wyatt Sr. as Henchman (as Al Wyatt)
