= The Straw Man (film) =

1953 British film by Donald Taylor

- British theatrical poster
- Directed by: Donald Taylor
- Written by: Donald Taylor
- Based on: novel Straw Man by Doris Miles Disney
- Produced by: Donald Taylor
- Starring: Dermot Walsh; Clifford Evans; Lana Morris
- Cinematography: Gerald Gibbs
- Edited by: John Reeve
- Production company: Hedgerley Films
- Distributed by: United Artists
- Release date: November 1953
- Running time: 74 minutes
- Country: United Kingdom
- Language: English

The Straw Man is a 1953 British second feature ('B') crime film directed by Donald Taylor and starring Dermot Walsh, Clifford Evans and Lana Morris. It was written by Taylor based on the 1951 novel Straw Man by Doris Miles Disney. It was released by United Artists. Its storyline focuses on insurance fraud.

== Plot ==
Lincoln Hunter's ex-girlfriend is found dead in his house, and he is convicted of her murder. Because he has a large life policy his life, the insurance company assign their chief investigator Jeff Howard to investigate, assisted by private detective Mal Ferris.

== Cast ==
- Dermot Walsh as Mal Ferris
- Clifford Evans as Jeff Howard
- Lana Morris as Ruth Hunter
- Amy Dalby as Lucy Graham
- Ronald Ward as Clay Rushlow
- Josephine Stuart as Miss Ward
- Peter Williams as Inspector Conrad
- John Forrest as Johnny Gordon
- Philip Saville as Link Hunter
- Neal Arden as O'Brien
- Hamlyn Benson as Porter
- Grace Denbigh Russell as Isobel Drayton
- Lloyd Lamble as Dr. Canning
- John Sarratt as Kessler
- Barbara Trevor as Mrs. Copper
- Fred Lake as Henry Lewis
- Joan Hayward as Agnes Becker
- Gus James as Wick
- Michael Jackson as waiter
- Jack Leonard as telephone manager
- Elaine Inescourt as concierge

== Production ==
It was shot partly on location in Brighton. Filming also took place at Wembley Studios with sets designed by Duncan Sutherland.

== Reception ==
The Monthly Film Bulletin wrote: "The suspense, which carries the first part of the film, sags in the middle and disappears before the end. This may be due to the fact that the entire film (apart from one short sequence at the beginning) is shot indoors, and the players seem to suffer from the lack of air."

Kine Weekly wrote: "Its mostly talk and constant chatter adds to the confusion, Few will know what it is all about and will care less. ...The picture poses a pretty problem at the start, but soon substitutes words for deeds. Clifford Evans, as Howard, triumphs over an untidy script, but Dermot Walsh and Lana Morris exaggerate as Ferris and Ruth. Tho rest aren't much better. The denouement too, lacks punch and showmanship."

In British Sound Films: The Studio Years 1928–1959 David Quinlan rated the film as "mediocre", writing: "Thriller loses one's interest after tense beginning."
