= Do Not Fold, Spindle or Mutilate =

1971 television film directed by Ted Post

- DVD cover
- Genre: Mystery/Suspense/Comedy
- Based on: Do Not Fold, Spindle or Mutilate by Doris Miles Disney
- Screenplay by: John D. F. Black
- Directed by: Ted Post
- Starring: Myrna Loy; Helen Hayes; Mildred Natwick; Sylvia Sidney; John Beradino; Vince Edwards
- Music by: Jerry Goldsmith
- Country of origin: United States
- Original language: English

Production
- Executive producer: Lee Rich
- Producer: Robert Jacks
- Cinematography: Stanley Cortez, A.S.C.
- Editors: Folmar Blangsted, A.C.E.
- Running time: 73 minutes
- Production company: Samuel Goldwyn Studios

Original release
- Network: ABC
- Release: November 9, 1971

Do Not Fold, Spindle or Mutilate is a 1971 American made-for-television mystery film directed by Ted Post, starring Myrna Loy, Helen Hayes, Mildred Natwick, Sylvia Sidney, John Beradino and Vince Edwards, with the screenplay adapted by John D. F. Black from a novel of the same name by Doris Miles Disney. It was broadcast as the ABC Movie of the Week on November 9, 1971.

== Plot ==
Four middle-class Pasadena ladies in their late sixties habitually meet for lunch and exchange small talk with their waitress. They propose to create a fictitious young woman named Rebecca, and to submit her profile to a computer dating service. Several days after doing so they begin to receive letters from potential suitors, and derive additional amusement from reading them out loud.

Concurrently, a young woman becomes alarmed by her date Mal's attempts to force himself upon her, and manages to escape into her home. His audible thoughts reveal that he has dangerous difficulty in relating to women.

Mal turns his obsessive attentions to the fictitious "Rebecca", and not only sends a letter but tracks down the telephone number of "her" address. He calls and speaks to one of the old ladies, who impishly accepts a date with him at a local bar. In a spirit of fun, the four ladies wait at the bar to see what Mal looks like; however, when he arrives he mistakes a hooker, Brenda for "Rebecca", and leaves with her. When they arrive at Brenda's apartment and she asks for money, an outraged Mal attacks and kills her.

Once the ladies realize their actions have led to murder, they go to the police; however, they also investigate Mal themselves, which places them in grave danger.

== Cast ==
- Helen Hayes as Sophie Tate Curtis
- Myrna Loy as Evelyn Tryon
- Mildred Natwick as Shelby Saunders
- Sylvia Sidney as Elizabeth Gibson
- Vince Edwards as Mal Weston
- John Beradino as Detective Hallum
- Larry D. Mann as Police Sergeant Lutz
- Barbara Davis as Brenda
- Paul Smith as Cutter
- Gary Vinson as Jonas
- Diane Shalet as Ruth Mellon
- Dodo Denney as Trudy
- Patrecia Wynand as Hostess
- Leonidas Ossetynski as Florist
- John Mitchum as Mr. Tubbs
- Margaret Wheeler as Mrs. Mellon
- Joe Haworth as Detective
- William Sumper as Man in Handcuffs

== Legacy ==
On December 16, 1972, 13 months after the ABC broadcast of Do Not Fold, Spindle or Mutilate on November 9, 1971, NBC reunited Hayes and Natwick in The Snoop Sisters, a two-hour television film about two aged sisters who write mysteries as well as solve crimes.

Although different characters than in Do Not Fold, the Snoop sisters' relationship clearly resembles that of the one adventurous / one sensible style of Do Not Fold's Helen Hayes and Myrna Loy, but with Natwick now cast as the level-headed sibling. Four additional 90-minute episodes of The Snoop Sisters were broadcast between December 1973 and March 1974.

== Reception ==
In the 1989 edition of Leonard Maltin's TV Movies & Video Guide, the film was rated "Average", with the comment that the "way in which prank turns frightening could've been handled far, far better; otherwise, good performances." Steven H. Scheuer's Movies on TV and Videocassette (1986–87 edition) gave the movie 1½ stars (out of 4), with the opening sentence stating, "[T]his all-star comedy about murder tends to be a bit coy..."

== See also ==
- The Snoop Sisters
- List of television films produced for American Broadcasting Company
