= No Next of Kin =

1959 mystery novel by Doris Miles Disney

- Author: Doris Miles Disney
- Language: English
- Genre: Mystery
- Publisher: Doubleday
- Publication date: October 8, 1959
- Publication place: United States

No Next of Kin is a 1959 mystery thriller novel by the American writer Doris Miles Disney. It was first published by Doubleday under its Crime Club label.

== Plot Summary ==
Andrea Langdon, the daughter of a prominent American politician, finds herself targeted by blackmailers. Fergus McDonald, a reporter with whom she is romantically involved, attempts to help her save her reputation.

=== Background ===
The Hartford circus fire, a real tragedy that occurred in 1944, served as an inspiration Langdon's backstory, although the famous unidentified "Little Miss 1565" is rewritten as "Little Sir 915." Disney changed the location of the fire and stampede is changed from an itinerant circus to a charity bazar at "a fire-trap wooden hotel at a very smart summer resort in Connecticut."

== Publication ==
In early 1964, No Next of Kin was issued in paperback by Dell.

== Reception ==
The novel received positive reviews. "Doris Miles Disney in her easy, unaffected and excellent story telling ability," wrote the Lewiston Sun-Journal, "has turned out a crackerjack." The Stamford Advocate reported that the novel "lives up to Miss Disney's reputation for smooth mystery stories."
