= Family Skeleton (novel) =

Novel by Doris Miles

- First edition
- Author: Doris Miles Disney
- Language: English
- Genre: Mystery
- Publisher: Doubleday
- Publication date: 1949
- Publication place: United States
- Media type: Print

Family Skeleton is a 1949 comedy mystery novel by the American writer Doris Miles Disney.

== Adaptation ==
In 1950 it was made into a film Stella by Twentieth Century Fox, starring Ann Sheridan and Victor Mature.

== Bibliography ==
- Goble, Alan. The Complete Index to Literary Sources in Film. Walter de Gruyter, 1999.
