= Post Mortem (band) =

American thrash metal band

- Origin: Boston, Massachusetts, U.S.
- Genres: Thrash metal; death metal

Post Mortem was an American thrash metal band, formed in 1982 in suburban Boston, Massachusetts. The band also helped pioneer the underground subgenre of death metal.

== History ==
The band formed when its members were still in high school. They rehearsed every day, often rushing home to write music after classes. John McCarthy penned the personal songs while drummer Rick McIver wrote the gore lyrics. John Alexander helped write most of the songs. "Our whole concept was that we honestly didn't give a fuck. That's why we're lumped in with punk rock as well as metal," McCarthy said, adding, "It's much better to piss off people who think they're pissed off than to piss off your grandma or your mother or your father."

Post Mortem's debut album, Coroner's Office, was released in 1986. Coroner's Office continues to find new listeners and is now as remembered for its unusual styling and flirtation with jazz and punk. The album proved very influential, as it brought musical experimentation common in metal among bands like Cephalic Carnage and The Dillinger Escape Plan.

The band consists of John McCarthy (vocals), John Alexander (guitar), Mark Kelley (bass), and Rick "Ricky Magic" McIver (drums). Contrary to popular belief, Post Mortem were not named after the Slayer song, which was released in 1986.

Seth Putnam, vocalist for Anal Cunt, almost joined Post Mortem a few times, but did not actually do so until 1990 after Anal Cunt's first brief breakup. Putnam played various shows with the band and recorded one song with them; there are also live tapes and rehearsal tapes that exist with him on vocals. They did a tour in January 1991 that was supposed to be with Yugoslavian band Patareni but they could not leave their country. They did some more local shows and prepared for a new album until Putnam quit in 1992. After the death of their previous frontman John McCarthy, Putnam gave an interview and was asked about him. He said: "[McCarthy] was getting an SSI cheque and getting drunk on Listerine and shit like that. But I was surprised when he died. The strangest thing was that he was a grandfather at age 40. Even when he first had a kid I thought it was strange. He was one of my best friends of all time. I could say bad things about him but I won't because the good times outweigh the bad. In 2008, we played a show in California with Anal Blast and The Meat Shits. People were taking bets if I would die first or Don Decker from Anal Blast. Don died like a year later." Putnam also did vocals on the song "Oh So Evil" on Post Mortem's Message from the Dead album.

Many metal bands have acknowledged the influence of Post Mortem, such as Cianide, Grief (who covered the entire Coroner's Office album), Disharmonic Orchestra, who covered "(It's Just) A Thought", and Anal Cunt (who covered Post Mortem's "1066").

== Members ==
=== Current ===
- Mirai Kawashima – vocals
- John Alexander – guitar
- Mark Kelley – bass
- Rick "Ricky Magic" McIver – drums

=== Founding ===
- Norman McIver – vocals
- Tom Nelligan – guitar
- Mark Kelley – bass
- Rick "Ricky Magic" McIver – drums

=== Notable past ===
- John McCarthy – vocals (died 2009)
- Seth Putnam (Anal Cunt) (died 2011)
- Michelle Meldrum (Phantom Blue and Meldrum) (died 2008)
- Chris Jordan – vocals
- Rich Goyette – guitar

== Discography ==
- 1982 "Run Amok" – cassette
- 1983 "Punk After Death" – cassette (recorded in 1982)
- 1985 "The Dead Shall Rise" – cassette
- 1985 "Death to the Masses" – cassette
- 1986 "Turkey on Your Nose..." – cassette
- 1986 Speed Metal Hell II – various artists
- 1986 Thrash Metal Attack! – various artists
- 1986 Coroner's Office – debut album
- 1987 "The Missing Link" – EP
- 1988 Beatings are in Order – album
- 1989 Festival of Fun – album
- 1990 "Ring Around the Rectum" – single
- 1990 "Seasoned NoSalt Makes My Beef Stew Taste Like My Beef Stew" – single
- 1991 Killed by the Machinery of Sorrow – compilation album
- 1993 Destined for Failure – album
- 1994 Court Metrage – various artists
- 1995 Convolutions – album
- 2007 Deterioration of the Flesh – live and some previously unreleased material
- 2009 Message from the Dead – album
