= No Cloak – No Dagger =

British television series (1963)

- Genre: Mystery thriller
- Written by: Duncan Ross
- Directed by: Christopher Barry
- Starring: William Franklyn; Lana Morris
- Composer: Tristram Cary
- Country of origin: United Kingdom
- Original language: English
- No. of series: 1
- No. of episodes: 6 (all missing)

Production
- Producer: Christopher Barry
- Running time: 55 minutes
- Production company: BBC

Original release
- Network: BBC One
- Release: 1 September – 6 October 1963

No Cloak – No Dagger is a British television series that originally aired on the BBC in 1963. All six episodes are believed to be lost.

== Main cast ==
- William Franklyn as Ian Lambart
- Lana Morris as Emma Cresswell
- Cyril Luckham as Detective Chief Superintendent Gage
- Caroline Blakiston as Pat Penmore
- Manning Wilson as Sergeant Rose
- Patrick Troughton as Trev
- Peter Thomas as Hawkins
- Freda Bamford as Kitty
- Armine Sandford as Mary
- Jack Stewart as Donald Fraser
- Rio Fanning as Vallins
- Wendy Gifford as Alice
- Clifford Cox as Policeman
- Denis Cleary as Plain clothes man
- Norman Mitchell as Police Sergeant

== Bibliography ==
- Maxford, Howard. Hammer Complete: The Films, the Personnel, the Company. McFarland, 2018.
