= Lana Morris =

British actress (1930–1998)

- Born: Avril Maureen Anita Morris; 11 March 1930; Hackney, London, England, UK
- Died: 28 May 1998 (aged 68); Windsor, Berkshire, England
- Occupation: Actress
- Years active: 1948–1990
- Spouse: Ronnie Waldman (1953–1978) (his death) (1 child)

Lana Morris, born Avril Maureen Anita Morris (11 March 1930 – 28 May 1998) was a British film, stage and television actress during the 1950s and 1960s.

She played the role of Helene Hillmer in the 1967 BBC adaptation of The Forsyte Saga, and appeared in many other television programmes. She worked with Roger Moore in The Saint, appearing on the cover of an early 1960s tie-in reprinting of the novel The Saint in New York. She later became a television panellist. She was also in British films such as I Start Counting.

She was married to the BBC executive Ronnie Waldman (1914–1978).

She died of a heart attack in Windsor, Berkshire, having been taken ill shortly after the first performance of the Barbara Taylor Bradford adaptation Dangerous to Know at the Theatre Royal, Windsor, aged 68.

== Filmography ==
=== Film ===
Year	Title	Role	Notes
1946	School for Secrets	Mrs Watlington	Credited as Pamela Matthews
1948	Spring in Park Lane	Rosie	
1948	The Weaker Sex	Lolly	
1948	It's Hard to Be Good	Daphne	
1949	Trottie True	Bouncie Barrington	
1949	The Chiltern Hundreds	Bessie Sykes	
1950	Morning Departure	Rose Snipe	
1950	Guilt Is My Shadow	Betty	
1950	The Reluctant Widow	Becky	
1950	Trio	Gladys	(segment "The Verger")
1950	The Woman in Question	Lana Clark	
1951	A Tale of Five Cities	Delia Morel Romanoff	
1953	The Red Beret	Pinky	
1953	The Straw Man	Ruth Hunter	
1953	The Good Beginning	Evie Watson	
1953	Black 13	Marion	
1953	Trouble in Store	Sally Wilson	
1954	Radio Cab Murder	Myra	
1954	Thought to Kill	Ruby	
1955	Man of the Moment	Penny	
1956	Home and Away	Mary	
1958	Moment of Indiscretion	Janet Miller	
1958	Passport to Shame	Girl	
1959	No Trees in the Street	Marge	
1959	Jet Storm	Jane Tracer	
1960	October Moth	Molly	
1970	I Start Counting	Leonie	

=== Television ===
Year	Title	Role	Notes
1954	The Six Proud Walkers	Martha	6 episodes
1956	Dixon of Dock Green	Elsie Kelly	1 episode
1957–1958	The Royalty	Maisie	10 episodes
1958	Solo for Canary	Ruth Maddern	6 episodes
1958	Murder Bag	May Kean	1 episode
1959	Charlesworth	Gahla	1 episode
1959	The Naked Lady	Sylvia Craig	4 episodes
1959	The Invisible Man	Ellen Summers	1 episode
1959–1961	Murder Bag	Various	2 episodes
1960–1961	BBC Sunday-Night Play	Various	3 episodes
1960	International Detective	Suzanne Colmar	1 episode
1960	No Wreath for the General	Isobel Gilmour	6 episodes
1961	Tales of Mystery	Nancy Burley	1 episode
1962	The Six Proud Walkers	Polly Arden	13 episodes
1962	Zero One	Mrs. Warner	1 episode
1962	Maigret	Felicie	1 episode (S3/Ep6)
1963	Jezebel ex UK	Isobel Garnett	1 episode
1963	Love Story	Bobby	1 episode
1963	No Cloak – No Dagger	Emma Cresswell	6 episodes
1963	The Saint	Teresa Alvarez	1 episode
1964	ITV Sunday Night Drama	ok Probert	1 episode
1964	The Old Wives' Tale	Sophia Scales	5 episodes
1965	Thursday Theatre	Various	2 episodes
1965	The Flying Swan	Marion Watson	1 episode
1967	The Forsyte Saga	Helene Hillmer	10 episodes
1968	Never a Cross Word	Maureen	1 episode
1971	Paul Temple	Gwen Fox	1 episode
1974	Intimate Strangers	Dr. Jenni Bowers	1 episode
1977	ITV Playhouse	Aunt Marie	1 episode
1984	Emmerdale	Gillian	6 episodes
1987	Inspector Morse	Miss Tree	1 episode
1987–1990	Howards' Way	Vanessa Rolfe	28 episodes, final screen role
