= Doris Miles Disney =

American novelist (1907–1976)

- Born: December 22, 1907; Glastonbury, Connecticut
- Died: March 9, 1976 (aged 68)
- Occupation: Mystery writer/novelist
- Spouse: George J. Disney
- Children: Elizabeth Disney Laing, Granddaughter, Sarah Elizabeth Laing
- Parent: Edward L. Hart Elizabeth Malone Miles

Doris Miles Disney (December 22, 1907 – March 9, 1976) was an American mystery writer. She wrote 47 novels, many of which were best sellers; several were made into feature films or TV movies.

In 14 of her writing years Disney published two novels, and the Times noted that "Since 1945, one or more of her books has been published each year." Her last novel was published posthumously.

== About her novels ==
Disney's first book (A Compound for Death) coincided with her daughter's 1943 birth, and most of Mrs. Disney's main characters were based on acquaintances of herself or her daughter.

Disney had worked in the publicity field and in the insurance business, and three recurring sleuths in her novels were

- postal inspector David Madden
- insurance investigator Jeff DiMarco. and
- county detective Jim O'Neill.

Otherwise, according to her publisher, each novel was "interesting in a somewhat different manner from anything she's tried before."

Disney's Family Skeleton was made into the movie Stella, and Do Not Fold, Spindle, or Mutilate was the basis of an American TV film. Family Skeleton/Stella's hero Jeff di Marco included the reuse of Disney's "most famous" sleuth for Straw Man in 1951.

=== Reviews ===
Her first novel was reviewed by The New York Times; subsequent novels and the films made from them were regularly reviewed.

== Biography ==
She was born Doris Miles in Glastonbury, Connecticut, and married George J. Disney in 1936. She died in Fredericksburg, Virginia. Their daughter Elizabeth Disney Laing, a writer and theatrical actress, was born 1943.

The Disneys' relatives included two of Mrs. Disney's sisters, Elizabeth H. Miles and Mrs. George B. Tolve, and the Disneys had nieces and nephews, some of whom told their aunt of their disliking that she killed off too many women in her stories.

== Novels ==
- A Compound for Death (1943)
- Murder on a Tangent (1945)
- Dark Road (1946) (adapted into the 1950 movie Fugitive Lady)
- Who Rides a Tiger (1946)
- Appointment at Nine (1947)
- Enduring Old Charms (1947)
- Testimony by Silence (1948)
- That Which Is Crooked (1948)
- Count the Ways (1949)
- Family Skeleton (1949) (adapted into the 1950 movie Stella)
- Fire at Will (1950)
- Look Back on Murder (1951)
- Straw Man (1951) (adapted into the 1953 movie The Straw Man)
- Heavy, Heavy Hangs (1952)
- Do Unto Others (1953)
- Prescription: Murder (1953)
- The Last Straw (1954)
- Trick or Treat (1955) (adapted as a 1958 episode of Kraft Television Theatre)
- Room for Murder (1955)
- Unappointed Rounds (1956)
- Method in Madness (1957)
- My Neighbor's Wife (1957)
- Black Mail (1958)
- Did She Fall or Was She Pushed? (1959)
- No Next of Kin (1959)
- Dark Lady (1960)
- Mrs. Meeker's Money (1961)
- Find the Woman (1962)
- Should Auld Acquaintance (1962)
- Here Lies... (1963)
- The Departure of Mr. Gaudette (1964)
- The Hospitality of the House (1964)
- Shadow of a Man (1965)
- Unsuspected Evil (1965)
- At Some Forgotten Door (1966)
- The Magic Grandfather (1966)
- Night of Clear Choice (1967)
- Money for the Taking (1968)
- Voice from the Grave (1968)
- Two Little Children and How They Grew (1969)
- Do Not Fold, Spindle, or Mutilate (1970) (adapted into the 1971 TV movie of the same name)
- The Chandler Policy (1971)
- Three's a Crowd (1971)
- The Day Miss Bessie Lewis Disappeared (1972)
- Only Couples Need Apply (1973) (adapted into the 1974 TV movie Betrayal)
- Don't Go Into the Woods Today (1974)
- Cry for Help (1975)
- Winifred (1976)
