= Dark Road (novel) =

1946 mystery novel by Doris Miles Disney

- First edition
- Author: Doris Miles Disney
- Language: English
- Genre: Mystery
- Publisher: Doubleday
- Publication date: 1946
- Publication place: United States
- Media type: Print

Dark Road is a 1946 mystery thriller novel by the American writer Doris Miles Disney.

== Adaptation ==
In 1950 the film Fugitive Lady was based on the novel, starring Janis Paige and Binnie Barnes.

== Bibliography ==
- Goble, Alan. The Complete Index to Literary Sources in Film. Walter de Gruyter, 1999.
