= Voice from the Grave (novel) =

1968 mystery novel by Doris Miles Disney

- Author: Doris Miles Disney
- Language: English
- Genre: Mystery
- Publisher: Doubleday
- Publication date: 1968
- Publication place: United States
- Pages: 190

Voice from the Grave is a 1968 American mystery novel by Doris Miles Disney. It was first published by Doubleday under their Crime Club imprint.

== Plot Summary ==
Adele VanOstrand's teenage son, Howie Linsley, goes missing on his annual summer canoeing trip. After weeks with no sign of life from either Howie or his friend Dennis, she is distraught but refuses to believe Howie is dead. Then Adele gets a call from Howie, assuring her that he is alive but that he's in trouble and needs money. Things are further complicated when, after Adele sends the requested five-figure sum, a decomposed body washes ashore that may or may not be Howie.

== Reception ==
The Boston Globe recommended Voice from the Grave stating that it was "one of (Disney's) best books." The Washington Daily News wrote of the novel: "Superior characters and a tense emotional atmosphere make this one a winner." The Buffalo News called it "as exciting as mystery as a modern family counselor might encounter." In a slightly less enthusiastic review, the Sun Journal of Lewiston wrote that Disney's characters were well-written but that "she has not caught any flavor of Maine in her story."
