= Coroner's Office =

Studio album by Post Mortem
- Released: 1986
- Recorded: February 1986 at Baker Street Studios in Watertown, Massachusetts
- Genres: Death metal; hardcore punk; thrash metal
- Length: 41:40
- Label: Taboo Records

Coroner's Office is an album by American death metal band Post Mortem. It was their debut LP and was influential on the genre.

== Recording process ==
After rehearsing together for several years, Post Mortem entered Baker Street Studios in Watertown, Massachusetts to record their debut LP. The songs they recorded for the album were so old that the band did not even play many of them live anymore. While recording the songs, studio owner Roger Baker was convinced the band was creating a new sound in the genre. Most of the songs on the album were recorded relatively quickly and the cost for the entire album was only $900. The album was released in 1986 and became relatively popular to the underground scene.

== Reception ==
After its release, Coroner's office generated a significant buzz in the underground community. It is estimated that nearly 20,000 copies of the album were distributed. Now the album is considered a sort of cult classic that influenced a lot of later artists in similar genres. One author summarizes the album's influence by saying that it, "is now as remembered for its unusual styling and flirtation with jazz and punk as it is as an overlooked death metal cornerstone." Overall, the album garnered generally positive reviews, but failed to make the radar of any large publishers.

=== Fan reaction ===
While touring, the band received significant criticism over the role of experimental and classical music in their songs. Fans reacted poorly to the live performances of some tracks and the experimental direction the band was heading.

== Track listing ==
1. "Armies of the Dead" - 1:09
2. "Waiting for the Funeral" - 3:04
3. "Ready to Die" - 2:15
4. "No Time" - 5:06
5. "Concealed" - 3:05
6. "(It Was) Just a Thought" - 5:49
7. "Syncopated Jazz" - 0:38
8. "Soupy Sales" - 0:13
9. "Coroner's Office" - 1:20
10. "Death to the Masses" - 5:33
11. "I Want to Die" - 12:25
12. "Run Amok" - 0:44
13. "Caveman" - 6:54
14. "Organized Crime" - 2:35
15. "Fetus Man" - 2:27
16. "Quietus (Charnel House)" - 6:21

=== Bonus tracks ===
17. "Waiting for the Funeral (No Intro Edit)" - 2:33
18. "Run Amok (Edit)" - 0:42
19. "Armies of the Dead (No Feedback Edit)" - 1:09
20. "Waiting for the Funeral (Live in 87)" - 2:36
21. "Death to the Masses (Live in 87)" - 4:54

== Re-release ==
In 2011, it was reported that the album will be re-released under the New Renaissance Records label as a CD. The album has been digitally remastered and will include The Missing Link EP, as well as new artwork and liner notes. The release date has not yet been confirmed.
