= Gordon Glenwright =

Australian actor

- Born: Gordon Charles Glenwright; 17 March 1918; Sydney, Australia
- Died: 25 May 1985 (aged 67); Sydney, New South Wales, Australia
- Occupations: Actor; stage manager; playwright; soldier
- Years active: 1948–1984

Gordon Charles Glenwright (17 March 1918– 25 May 1985) was an Australian actor, stage manager and playwright.

== Early life ==
Glenwright was born in Sydney, New South Wales in 1918, his father worked as a mechanic in the Civil Constructional Corps in the northern Queensland town of Charters Towers. His mother was a jockey.

Glenwright attended school in the Charters Towers suburb of Richmond Hill. He left school to join the Australian Army Cadets in Wahroonga, enlisting on 21 July 1942.

He served as a lieutenant in the Australian Army during the Second World War. He was discharged from the Army on 22 January 1946.

== Career ==
Glenwright was familiar to audiences for his appearances on stage, television and film. He described himself as a "tradesman" in regards to his approach to acting work.

He started his theatre career in the late 1940s, and started moving into television roles in the mid-1950s, primarily appearing in serials and telemovies.

Glenwright's theatre credits include The Removalists, The Rivals, The Homecoming, King Lear, Carnival!, Man of La Mancha and The Day After the Fair. While acting for the New England Travelling Playhouse, Glenwright was also tour manager for their schools tour of New South Wales.

He appeared in numerous television series including Bellbird, Homicide, Division 4 and Matlock Police. He played the regular role of Hubbard in Class of '74 from 1974 to 1975. He had a recurring role as Arthur Partridge in Number 96 from 1975 to 1976. He also appeared as Detective Inspector Harry King in King’s Men from 1975 to 1980. He then starred as Sergeant Vic Brown on Carson's Law from 1983 to 1984.

His film credits include Eureka Stockade (1949), The Shiralee (1957), Inn of the Damned (1975) and The Dove (1974) – the latter alongside Gregory Peck.

Glenwright also appeared in documentaries and short films, as well as having extensive radio experience, both on the ABC and in commercial radio. Additionally, he had his own televised puppet show, and sang with the Italian Opera Company.

== Filmography ==
=== Film ===
Year	Title	Role	Type
1957	Three in One	Alex	Anthology film (segment: The City)
1957	The Shiralee	Pete	Feature film
1957	One for the Road		Short film
1966	They're a Weird Mob	Sid	Feature film
1967	Journey Out of Darkness	Bartender	Feature film
1974	The Dove	Darwin Harbour Master	Feature film
1975	Inn of the Damned	Squire Grimstead	Feature film

=== Television ===
Year	Title	Role	Type
1958	The Trial of Madeleine Smith		TV play
1959	The Seagull	Soriun	TV play
1959	Hamlet	The Gravedigger	TV play
1959	Shell Presents		TV play: "They Were Big, They Were Blue, They Were Beautiful"
1959	Misery Me	Carlo Bambas	TV play
1959; 1960	Whiplash	Petey Hibberd / Carthy	2 episodes
1960	Stormy Petrel	Robert Campbell	1 episode
1960	The Slaughter of St. Teresa's Day	Charlie Gibson	TV play
1960	The Grey Nurse Said Nothing (The General Motors Hour)	Dr Lloyd Angell	TV play
1961	The Sergeant from Burralee	Captain Alcot	TV play
1961	Traveller Without Luggage	Butler	TV film
1962	Manhaul	Dinny McQuade	TV play
1962	Telestory	Narrator	Episode: "They're a Weird Mob"
1963	Consider Your Verdict	Herbert Pomeroy	1 episode
1963	Ballad for One Gun	Superintendent Hare	TV play
1963	The Hungry Ones	Captain Thomas Gilbert	2 episodes
1963	Tribunal	William Kidd	1 episode
1963	The Tempest	Stephano	TV play
1964	I Have Been Here Before	Sam Shipley	TV play
1964	The Adventurers	Speedboat Driver	3 episodes
1964	The One That Got Away	Anthony Leach	TV play
1964	The Stranger	Lord Mayor	1 episode
1964–1974	Homicide	Peter Mason / Arnold Stone / Dr Miller / John Healy	4 episodes
1965	My Brother Jack	Bostock	Miniseries, 2 episodes
1966	Be Our Guest	Grandpa	
1966	Nice Widow at Quinto	The Conductor	TV play
1967	You Can't See 'Round Corners		1 episode
1967	Hunter	Oscar	3 episodes
1967	Contrabandits		Episode: "Madame Ukelele"
1968	Skippy the Bush Kangaroo	Coombes	1 episode
1968	The Battlers	Bongo Byrne	5 episodes
1969	Riptide	Plenderfeith	1 episode
1970	Mrs. Finnegan	Dobson	1 episode
1970–1974	Division 4	Eric Anderson / Norman Adams / Paul McBride	3 episodes
1972	Behind the Legend		Season 1, episode 7: "C. Y. O'Connor"
1973	Boney	Sgt Carter	1 episode
1973	Spyforce	Brigadier Barton	1 episode
1974	Things That Go Bump in the Night	Charlie	Miniseries, 1 episode
1974	Escape from Singapore		TV documentary film
1974–1975	Class of '74	Hubbard	382 episodes
1974; 1976	Matlock Police	Sean Ashe / Johnstone	2 episodes
1975	The Rise and Fall of Wellington Boots		TV special
1975–1976	Number 96	Arthur Partridge	10 episodes
1975–1980	King's Men	Detective Inspector Harry King	14 episodes
1977	Pig in a Poke		1 episode
1977	Say You Want Me		TV film
1979	Doctor Down Under	Mr Benson	1 episode
1981	The Young Doctors	Jack Collis	2 episodes
1982	Taurus Rising	Harry Brent	
1983–1984	Carson's Law	Sgt Vic Brown	135 episodes

== Stage ==
Year	Title	Role	Venue / company
1948	Pride and Prejudice		Minerva Theatre, Sydney
1948	Storm in a Teacup		Minerva Theatre, Sydney
1948	Julius Caesar		Theatre Royal Sydney
1948	Ah, Wilderness!		Minerva Theatre, Sydney
1949	The Maid of the Mountains		Sydney Conservatorium of Music
1949	Twelfth Night		Theatre Royal Sydney
1949	Dark Enchantment		Minerva Theatre, Sydney
1949	Pirates at the Barn		Minerva Theatre, Sydney
1951	Light Up the Sky		Princess Theatre, Melbourne
1951	Aladdin and His Wonderful Lamp		Princess Theatre, Melbourne
1951	Arsenic and Old Lace	Teddie	Hew Theatre Royal
1951–1952	See How They Run	Sgt. Towers	King's Theatre, Melbourne, Theatre Royal, Adelaide, Princess Theatre, Melbourne & His Majesty's Theatre, Auckland
1953	For Better for Worse		Theatre Royal Sydney
1954	Eternal Night		Independent Theatre, Sydney
1957–1958	The Shifting Heart	Det. Sgt. Lukie	Elizabethan Theatre, Sydney
1959	The Piccadilly Bushman	Lew Leggat	Comedy Theatre, Melbourne, Theatre Royal Sydney, Her Majesty's Theatre, Brisbane, Theatre Royal, Adelaide with J. C. Williamson's
1962	Saint Joan		University of Adelaide, Palace Theatre, Sydney, Tivoli Theatre, Melbourne
1962	You Never Can Tell		University of Melbourne
1962–1963	Carnival!	Schlegel	Her Majesty's Theatre, Melbourne, Theatre Royal Sydney
1963	The Fire on the Snow		Independent Theatre, Sydney
1964	King Henry V	Pistol	Tent Theatre, Adelaide, Tent Theatre, Sydney
1964	Hullabaloo Belay		St James Playhouse, Sydney
1966	The Apple Cart		Ensemble Theatre, Sydney
1967	The Homecoming	Lead	UNSW Old Tote Theatre, Sydney, Canberra Theatre Centre
1967	Getting Married		Independent Theatre, Sydney
1969	Hamlet		UNSW Old Tote Theatre, Sydney, Playhouse, Canberra, Theatre Royal, Hobart
1969	The Rivals	Co-lead	Playhouse, Canberra
1969	Little Murder		UNSW, Sydney
1969	Rosencrantz and Guildenstern Are Dead	Polonius	Theatre Royal, Hobart
1970	The Band Wagon	Mr Botterill	Athenaeum Theatre, Melbourne, Phillip St Theatre, Sydney
1970	Dick Whittington		UNSW, Sydney
1970–1972	Man of La Mancha	Innkeeper / Governor	Her Majesty's Theatre, Melbourne, Theatre Royal Sydney, Her Majesty's Theatre, Adelaide, Canberra Theatre
1972	A Dead Liberty		AMP Theatrette, Sydney
1972	The Removalists	Simmonds	Phillip St Theatre, Sydney
1973	Suddenly at Home	Appleton	Comedy Theatre, Melbourne with J. C. Williamson's
1976	The Puddin' Club (Same Difference)		Bonaparte's Theatre Restaurant, Sydney
1977	Next		St James Playhouse, Sydney
1977	Funny Peculiar	Harry Asquith	Theatre Royal Sydney
1978	Don't Piddle Against the Wind, Mate	Frank Burke / Understudy for Bob	SGIO Theatre, Brisbane
1978	The Homecoming	Max	Townsville Civic Theatre, Cairns Civic Theatre
1978	King Lear	Earl of Kent	SGIO Theatre, Brisbane, Seymour Centre, Sydney
1979	No Names ... No Pack Drill	Det. Sgt. Browning	NSW regional tour
1979	The Day After the Fair	Arthur Harnham	Comedy Theatre, Melbourne, Theatre Royal Sydney
1981	Death of a Salesman	Willy Loman	Theatre 3, Canberra
1981	Travelling North	Frank	NSW & QLD tour
1981	Flexitime	The Boss	Phillip St Theatre, Sydney
1984	Salonika		Nimrod Theatre Company, Sydney

== Radio ==
Year	Title	Role	Notes
1952	The Explorers		
1955	Friday the 13th	Erik	
1955	Dangerous Assignment	Hugo Pt 2 (Singapore)	Episodes: "Sandakan, Borneo", "Singapore", "Tibet" with Grace Gibson Productions
1955	The Clock	George	Episodes: "Ghost Story", "Only Death is Timeless", "Deadlier than the Male"
1956	T-Men	Tax Agent Jack Ketch	Episodes: "The Case of the Loving Blonde", "The Case of the Bleeding Gold", "The Case of the Subfor Approach"
1957	Captain Carvallo	Private Gross	NC-CN & 4QR
1960	The Quiet Stranger	Old John	
1961	Passage of the Tangmar	Captain Goddard	
1979	The Drowned Phoenician Sailor	Shop Stewart	ABC Radio Sydney

== Death ==
Glenwright died on 25 May 1985, aged 67 in Sydney, New South Wales.
