= Walter Pym (actor) =

Australian actor (1905–1980)

- Born: 7 April 1905; Petersham, New South Wales, Australia
- Died: 22 January 1980 (aged 74); Prahran, Victoria, Australia
- Occupations: Actor, radio producer, studio manager
- Years active: 1929–1980
- Known for: End Play (1976); Mouth to Mouth (1978); Patrick (1978); Thirst (1979); The Box (1974); The Unisexers (1975)
- Spouse: Ivy Ray (1928–1963)
- Children: 1

Walter Pym (7 April 1905 – 22 January 1980) was an Australian actor and producer best known for his extensive experience in radio, during the 1940s and 1950s.

== Early life ==
Pym was born on 7 April 1905, in the Sydney suburb of Petersham.

== Career ==
In 1938, Pym became the studio and production manager at Melbourne radio station 3UZ. He acted in, as well as produced and directed numerous radio serials and plays during the 1940s, 1950s and 1960s for Australasian Radio Productions, Artransa, Crawford Productions and Grace Gibson Productions.

He also featured in film and television, making his screen debut in 1943 propaganda short film South West Pacific as Bill, the Sailor. His other film credits include war film The Rats of Tobruk (1944), sport comedy The Great Macarthy (1975) with John Jarratt, thriller End Play (1976) alongside John Waters and George Mallaby, John Duigan award-winning film Mouth to Mouth (1978), Ozploitation horror films Patrick (1978) and Thirst (1979), and adventure film The Earthling (1980) opposite child actor Ricky Schroder.

He also appeared in the TV plays Miss Mabel (1958), The Seagull (1959) and The Tempest (1963).

Pym had a recurring role in television soap opera The Box (1974) as Sid Merrymore for 27 episodes, and a main role in soap opera The Unisexers (1975) as Angus Melody for all 16 episodes. He also featured in numerous miniseries, including period drama Stormy Petrel (1960) about William Bligh, country period drama Serpent in the Rainbow (1973), colonial series Luke's Kingdom (1976), historical drama Against the Wind (1978) and Ride on Stranger (1979).

Additionally, he made numerous guest appearances in series such as Whiplash, Jonah, Consider Your Verdict, Pukemanu, Ryan, Homicide, Matlock Police, Prisoner, Cop Shop and Young Ramsay.

His final screen appearance was in television short The Cliffhanger in 1981.

== Personal life and death ==
Pym was married to Ivy Ray from 1928 until 1963, and had one son. He died in Prahran, Melbourne, on 22 January 1980, aged 74.

== Filmography ==
=== Film ===
Year	Title	Role	Notes
1943	South West Pacific	Bill, the Sailor	Short film
1944	The Rats of Tobruk		
1975	The Great Macarthy		
1976	End Play	Stanley Lipton	
1978	Mouth to Mouth	Fred	
1978	Patrick	Captain Fraser	
1979	Thirst	Ditcher	
1980	The Earthling	Uncle	

=== Television ===
Year	Title	Role	Notes
1958	Miss Mabel	The Lawyer	TV play
1959	The Seagull	Ilya	TV play
1960	Stormy Petrel	Lt. General Keppel	Miniseries, 1 episode
1961	Whiplash	Oscar Wenders / Mr Poole	3 episodes
1962	Jonah	Wilkins	1 episode
1963	The Tempest	Sebastian	TV play
1964	Consider Your Verdict	Julius Armstrong	1 episode
1971	Pukemanu		1 episode
1973	Serpent in the Rainbow		Miniseries
1974	Ryan	Professor Melton	1 episode
1974	Homicide	Charlie McCoy / Bill Byrne	1 episode
1974	The Box	Sid Merrymore	27 episodes
1974–1976	Matlock Police	Stumpy Farrell / Scrounger / Elliot Barker	3 episodes
1975	The Unisexers	Angus Melody	16 episodes
1976	Luke's Kingdom	Dinner Guest	Miniseries, 1 episode
1978	Against the Wind	Judge Advocate	Miniseries, 1 episode
1979	Prisoner	Angus	1 episode
1979	Ride on Stranger	Bishop Steele	Miniseries, 1 episode
1977–1980	Cop Shop	Laurie Whitford / Charles White / Grandpa Mervyn	5 episodes
1980	Young Ramsay	Bloke in Pub	1 episode
1981	The Cliffhanger	Old Man	Short TV movie

== Theatre ==
=== As actor ===
Year	Title	Role	Notes
1929	It Pays to Advertise	Ellcry Clarke	Theatre Royal Sydney with Nellie Bramley Company
1946	The Corn is Green		Minerva Theatre, Sydney with Whitehall Productions
1947	Youth at the Helm		Minerva Theatre, Sydney with Whitehall Productions
1952–1953	The White Sheep of the Family		Princess Theatre, Melbourne, Theatre Royal, Adelaide, Tivoli Theatre, Sydney
1952	Dick Whittington and His Cat		Princess Theatre, Melbourne
1960	Charley's Aunt		Elizabethan Theatre, Sydney with AETT
1962	The Ham Funeral		Palace Theatre, Sydney with AETT
1962–1963	The Sound of Music	Baron Eberfeld	Tivoli Theatre, Sydney, Elizabethan Theatre, Sydney with AETT
1964	King Henry V	Charles VI	Tent Theatre, Adelaide, Tent Theatre, Sydney with AETT
1964	Carousel	Star Keeper / Dr. Seldon	Princess Theatre, Melbourne, Tivoli Theatre, Sydney, Her Majesty’s Theatre, Brisbane with AETT
1966	The Fantasticks	The Actor	Downstage Theatre, Wellington
1967	The Spots of the Leopard	Professor Carmody	Downstage Theatre, Wellington
1967	The School for Wives	Henriques	Downstage Theatre, Wellington
1971	As You Like It	Corin	Mercury Theatre, Auckland
1971	The Country Wife	Sir Jasper Fidget	Mercury Theatre, Auckland
1971	Serjeant Musgrave's Dance	Mayor	Mercury Theatre, Auckland
1971	Canterbury Tales	Miller	Mercury Theatre, Auckland
1972	Charley’s Aunt	Stephen Spettigue	Mercury Theatre, Auckland
1972	Macrune's Guevara	The Questioner	Mercury Theatre, Auckland
1972	A Man for All Seasons	Cardinal Wolsey	Mercury Theatre, Auckland
1972	Conduct Unbecoming	The Doctor	Mercury Theatre, Auckland
1972	Kean	Solomon	His Majesty's Theatre, Auckland with Auckland Theatre Trust & Mercury Theatre
1972	The Skin of Our Teeth	Judge / 3rd Convener / Mr Tremayne	Mercury Theatre, Auckland
1972	Love's Labour's Lost	Constable Dull	Mercury Theatre, Auckland
1972	Guys and Dolls	Arvide Abernathy	Mercury Theatre, Auckland
1978	Jumpers	Crouch	Nimrod Theatre, Sydney

=== As director ===
Year	Title	Role	Notes
1949	Ah, Wilderness!	Director	University of Melbourne with Tin Alley Players
1951	Desert Highway	Director	University of Melbourne, National Theatre, Melbourne, Hobart with Tin Alley Players
1952	Montserrat	Director	University of Melbourne with Tin Alley Players
1962–1963	The Sound of Music	Producer	Tivoli Theatre, Sydney, Elizabethan Theatre, Sydney with AETT
1968	The Corn is Green	Director	Repertory Theatre, Christchurch with Canterbury Repertory Theatre Society
1969	Fings Ain't Wot They Used T'Be	Director	Christchurch, New Zealand with Canterbury Repertory Theatre Society
1969	Barefoot in the Park	Director	Christchurch with Canterbury Repertory Theatre Society
1970	Arms and the Man	Director	Christchurch with Canterbury Repertory Theatre Society
1970	The Facts of Life	Director	Christchurch with Canterbury Repertory Theatre Society

== Radio ==
=== As actor ===
Year	Title	Role	Notes
1940s	Drama Time	Actor	AWA radio series on 2CH
1941	Imperial Leader	Lord Salisbury	Legionnaire radio series on 2UE & 3UZ
1942	The Heroic Past	Actor	Radio series on 2UE
1943	The Better Road		ABC Radio Sydney radio play
1944–1947	Nyal Radio Playhouse	Actor	Grace Gibson Productions radio series on 2CH
1947	Opera for the People	Actor	Crawford Productions radio series
1948	Burtons of Banner Street	Actor	Radio series on 3AW
1950s–1960s	Pinnochio	Actor	Australasian Radio Productions radio series
1950s–1960s	The Renegade	Actor	Australasian Radio Productions radio series
1951	Ned Kelly	Living	Radio Repertory radio play
1954–1956	Assignment in Athens	Actor	Australasian Radio Productions radio series, episodes 2 & 4
1956	Unknown Quantity	Actor	Grace Gibson Productions radio series, episode 1
1967	Who Treads Alone	Mr Dennis	Radio Broadcast, New Zealand radio play with YC Radio Network
1967	Measure for Measure	Escalus	NZBC Studios, Wellington radio play
1979	London Assurance	Max Harkaway	ABC Radio Melbourne radio play
1979	Cymbeline	Belarius	ABC Radio Melbourne radio play
	Lady from Lisbon	Actor	

=== As director / producer ===
Year	Title	Role	Notes
1940s	Musical Comedy Theatre	Contributor	Artransa radio series
1940s–1950s	Caltex Theatre	Producer	Radio series
1944	The Army Hour	Producer	Radio series
1950s	Enchanted Island	Director	Australasian Radio Productions radio series on 3KZ
1950s	You Are There	Producer	Artransa radio series on Macquarie Network
1950s	Strange Stories of the Seas	Producer	Artransa radio series on 3DB
1950s–1960s	Eight Hour Alibi	Director	Australasian Radio Productions radio series
1950s–1960s	Legend	Director	Australasian Radio Productions radio series
1950s–1960s	Question Mark	Producer	Australasian Radio Productions radio series
1950s–1960s	The Renegade	Producer	Australasian Radio Productions radio series
1950s–1960s	Room 25	Director	Australasian Radio Productions radio series
1950s–1960s	Where Did it Come From	Producer	Australasian Radio Productions radio series
1951–	Truth is Stranger	Director	Artransa radio series
1954	Tarzan, King of the Apes	Producer	Radio series on 2GB
1954–1958	The Air Adventures of Hop Harrigan	Producer	Artransa radio series on Macquarie Network
Late 1950s	The Passionate Years	Producer	Fidelity Radio radio series on 2UW
1963	The Letter from Spain	Director	EMI radio series
