= Bligh Had a Daughter =

- ABC Weekly 24 April 1948
- Genre: drama play
- Running time: 60 mins (8:00 pm – 9:00 pm)
- Country of origin: Australia
- Language: English
- Syndicates: Australian Broadcasting Commission
- Starring: Patricia Kennedy
- Written by: Rex Rienits
- Original release: May 15, 1948

Bligh Had a Daughter is a 1948 Australia radio play by Rex Rienits about Mary Bligh, daughter of William Bligh, who was living with her father at the time of the Rum Rebellion.

It was one of the most highly regarded Australian radio plays of the 1940s

The play was repeated later in 1948 and in 1949. and produced again by the ABC in 1954 (in Brisbane, directed by Raymond Menmuir).

Rienits used elements of the play in his 1960 mini series Stormy Petrel, based on his radio serial of the same name. In that the role of Mary Bligh was played by Delia Williams.

== Premise ==
According to the ABC Weekly "Bligh, when appointed Governor of New South Wales 17 years after the 'Bounty' affair, had a wife and six daughters, but only Mary, his second daughter, accompanied him to his new place of appointment. There she acted as his Governor's lady until almost simultaneously she lost her husband and played a part in resisting the deposition of Bligh by the Rum Corps. Later she became a permanent resident of New South Wales, where her descendants are still living."

== Cast of 1954 Production ==
- Hector Lawrence as William Bligh
- Olga Massey as Mary Putland
- Donald McTaggert as Lieutenant John Putland
- Don Sanderson as Governor King
- Babette Stephens as Mrs. King, Housemaid
- Edmund Bourke as Major George Johnston
- Toby Harris as John Macarthur
- Jean Jarrott as Elizabeth Macarthur
- John Bowen as Mrs. William Core
- David Read as Richard Atkins
- Bernard Barry as Colonel Lachlan Macquarie
- Earle Reeve as Lt. Colonel Maurice O’Connell
