= If It's a Rose =

1958 Australian television film

- Written by: Dario Niccodemi translated by Robert Rietti
- Directed by: Raymond Menmuir
- Country of origin: Australia
- Original language: English

Production
- Running time: 60 minutes
- Production company: ABC

Original release
- Network: ABC
- Release: 26 March 1958 (Sydney, live)
- Release: 23 April 1958 (Melbourne, taped)

If It's a Rose is an Australian television movie, or rather a live television comedy play, which aired in 1958 on ABC. Australian TV drama was relatively rare at the time.

Duration was 60 minutes, in black-and-white. Archival status of the program is unknown. Annette Andre was a relatively unknown 18 year old.

A version had been performed on British TV in 1954.

== Plot ==
Set in Italy. Over the course of one day, Mario is courting Anna.

== Cast ==
- Annette Andre as Anna
- Don Pascoe as Mario
- Ethel Lang as the maid

== Production ==
It was recorded live in Sydney. It was an early television performance from Annette Andre who later recalled:

Even though I had been performing on stage from a very young age... I still had to overcome the exquisite torture of stage fright when I did my first TV drama. For some reason, my radio work was anxiety-free, perhaps because my ‘audience’ was only the other actors grouped around the microphone. My If It’s a Rose co-star was as nervous as I was and in Act II started calling me ‘Annette’ instead of ‘Maria’. If that wasn’t unsettling enough, the zipper on my costume got stuck and I had to play the rest of the scene facing the camera to hide the half-open dress. My ballet training came into play here, as I’d learned to overcome problems such as falling on stage and not let them affect my performance.

== See also ==
- The Passionate Pianist - 1957 ABC TV play
- List of live television plays broadcast on Australian Broadcasting Corporation (1950s)
