= Amber Mae Cecil =

Australian actress

- Cecil, pictured in the Sydney Morning Herald in 1954
- Born: 20 August 1938; Potts Point, Sydney, Australia
- Died: 15 July 1998 (aged 59); Sydney, Australia
- Occupation(s): Radio, theatre and television actor

Amber Mae Cecil (20 August 1938 – 15 July 1998) was a prominent Australian radio, theatre and television actress of the 1950s and 1960s.

== Early life ==
Amber Mae Cecil was born on 20 August 1938 in Potts Point. Her parents were also prominent figures of Australian radio, Rosalind Margaret Kennerdale (1910–1994), an actor, and Lawrence Henry Cecil (1888–1968), a producer for the Australian Broadcasting Corporation. Her grandfather, Norman Kennerdale (1880–1950), ran a school of dramatic arts, later managed by Rosalind Kennerdale.

== Career ==
Cecil was 12 years old when she made her debut in Grace Gibson's radio serial Night Beat. She was offered a stage role by Queenie Ashton and played roles for the Metropolitan, Independent and Mercury Theatre companies.

Two years later, in 1953, Cecil won the role of Janie in the popular 2GB comedy serial Life with Dexter, a role Cecil would maintain for the next eleven years. The show was recorded in front of a live audience and also included Ray Hartley, other radio roles include Life Can be Beautiful, Doctor Paul and Blue Hills, before appearing in Shakespearean plays

Cecil starred in early television movies or mini-series including The Multi-Coloured Umbrella (1958) and The Outcasts (1961), and had guest roles in popular television series including Homicide (in 1967, 1968 and 1974) and Division 4 (in 1969 and 1973). and she played a role in a broadcast of a radio play by Elizabeth Jolley produced in 1978.

== Personal life ==
Amber Mae Cecil had one son, born c.1960, actor and producer Jamie McCormick. She died in Sydney on 15 July 1998, aged 59 years.
