= Delia Williams =

Australian actress (born 1930)

Delia C. Williams (born 1930) was a British-born Australian actor.

Williams was born in Lambeth, London in 1930, where she trained at the Old Vic and worked for two years on the West End, as well as a model. She moved to Australia in 1956. She worked a number of times with Annette Andre.

Stephen Vagg of Filmink felt Williams played her role in Stormy Petrel "with verve and a twinkle in the eye. Williams was a Welsh actress who moved to Australia and had a short but glittering career here, nabbing many of the best roles on Australian TV drama at the time (eg. Cathy in Wuthering Heights, Nina in The Seagull); she had presence, beauty and charisma and it’s a shame that her career ended shortly after this when she married and became a mother."

== Filmography ==
=== Film ===
- The Seagull (1959) as Nina
- Hamlet (1959) as Ophelia
- Wuthering Heights (1959) as Cathy Earnshaw

=== Television ===
- Stormy Petrel (1960) as Mary Bligh
- Whiplash (1960)
- The Outcasts (1961) as Mary O’Connell

== Theatre ==
- Dial M for Murder (1957) - tour

== Radio ==
- Paradise Place (1957)
- Richard II (1959)
- The Loquat Tree (1961)
