= Mouth to Mouth (1978 film) =

- Directed by: John Duigan
- Written by: John Duigan
- Produced by: John Duigan; Jon Sainken
- Starring: Kim Krejus
- Cinematography: Tom Cowan
- Edited by: Tony Paterson
- Music by: Roy Ritchie
- Distributed by: Umbrella Entertainment
- Release date: July 1978
- Running time: 96 minutes
- Country: Australia
- Language: English
- Budget: AU$129,000

Mouth to Mouth is a 1978 film directed by John Duigan. It stars Kim Krejus and Sonia Peat. It was nominated for three awards by the Australian Film Institute in 1978.

The film was shot over four weeks in June and July 1977.

Duigan later described it as "in my early period of film-making in Melbourne, the film that I value most. I feel it is closest to what I set out for - and probably was the first film that I got close to achieving what I set out to do."

== Plot ==
Mouth to Mouth follows the lives of four young people, trying to improve their lives in a harsh and unforgiving city.

One night, after a fight with other inmates in a juvenile detention centre, Carrie and Jeanie escape and hide from the police in a derelict factory. Finding work in a roadside cafe, they meet Tim and Serge, two young country guys who have come to the city looking for work. After an eventful first night together, the girls invite the two boys to stay on with them in the old factory.

While Serge and Tim look for a job, the girls supplement the boy's dole cheques through petty theft from shops and supermarkets. Over time, the four become increasingly close, and manage to make a communal home together in the derelict factory. Carrie's ambitions for a better future place increasing strains on their friendship.

== Cast ==
- Kim Krejus as Carrie
- Sonia Peat as Jeanie
- Ian Gilmour as Tim
- Serge Frazzetto as Sergio
- Walter Pym as Fred

== Home media ==
Mouth to Mouth was released on DVD with a new print by Umbrella Entertainment in June 2012. This DVD is compatible with all region codes and includes special features such as the theatrical trailer and interviews with John Duigan, Kim Krejus, Sonia Peat, Ian Gilmour and Tom Cowan.
