= Artransa Park Film Studios =

Australian motion picture production company and film animation studio

Artransa Park Film Studios (APFS), was an Australian motion picture production company and film animation studio. Established in 1956, it was based in Sydney, Australia, and founded by Grace Gibson and Alfred Edward Bennett. Artransa was a contraction of the American Radio Transcriptions of Australia (founded 1934). The company employed 90 staff in 1967.

== Productions and co-productions ==
=== Film ===
Year	Title	Notes
1959	Summer of the Seventeenth Doll	
1969	Bound from California	
1970	Strange Holiday	TV movie
1970	Little Jungle Boy	TV movie
1972	Marco Polo Junior Versus the Red Dragon	Animated film
1975	Inn of the Damned	
1982	The Year of Living Dangerously	

=== Television ===
Year	Title	Notes
1959–1960	Whiplash	
1963	Beetle Bailey	
1965–1967	The Beatles	Animated TV series
1966–1967	Cool McCool	Animated TV series
1966–	The Lone Ranger	Animated TV series
1966–1968	Arthur! and the Square Knights of the Round Table	Animated TV series
1970–	Phoenix Five	
	Krazy Kat	
