= Kim Krejus =

Australian actress

- Occupation(s): Actress, teacher
- Years active: 1977–present
- Known for: 16th Street Actors Studio
- Notable work: Mouth to Mouth

Kim Krejus is an Australian stage, film, and television actress and acting coach. She is best known for her role in the 1978 film Mouth to Mouth, when she was just 19. She is the founder and artistic director of 16th Street Actors Studio in Melbourne, Australia.

== Early life and education ==
Kim Krejus grew up in a Catholic household with an abusive alcoholic stepfather.

She studied her craft under international acting teachers at National Institute of Dramatic Art (NIDA) in Sydney, HB Studio (training under Uta Hagen) and the Atlantic Theatre School in New York City, and Drama Centre London (where Colin Firth was a fellow student).

== Career ==
In 1978, at the age of 19, Krejus was nominated for an AACTA Award for Best Actress in a Leading Role for her performance in the film Mouth to Mouth. written and directed by John Duigan.

She also featured on the small screen, including in the lead role in TV miniseries Joe Wilson.

She has appeared on stage in productions such as The Heidi Chronicles at the Cremorne Theatre in South Brisbane and the Northside Theatre Company's production of A Small Family Business. She has also featured in Broadway productions in the United States, and in theatre across the UK.

== Teaching ==
Krejus has taught acting various Australian tertiary institutions, including Victorian College of the Arts, NIDA, Bond University, Central Queensland University. She has also been a private coach for many successful Australian actors including Kestie Morassi and Luke Mitchell.

=== 16th Street Actors Studio ===
Krejus is the founder and artistic director of 16th Street Actors Studio, a training school for actors, in Melbourne, Australia. As of 2024, Iain Sinclair is head of acting at the school, and Deborra-Lee Furness is patron.

In 2012, actress Zoe Naylor, who had graduated from drama school ten years earlier, attended a four-day workshop at 16th Street by visiting American acting coach and former stand-up comic Ivana Chubbuck (who had coached Charlize Theron and Halle Berry), and praised the mentors at the school.

== Personal life ==
Krejus turned to Buddhism to helped her deal with losing her sister to cancer when she was in her fifties.

== Filmography ==
=== Film ===
Year	Title	Role	Type
1978	Mouth to Mouth	Carrie	Feature film
1988	Alterations	Eleanor	TV movie
1988	Barracuda	Bonnie	TV movie
1991	Academy	Doctor #2	TV movie
1993	The Flood: Who Will Save Our Children?	Mrs Chapman	TV movie
1993	Official Denial	Dr Clark	TV movie
2008	Push Up	Pam (Mother)	Short film

=== Television ===
Year	Title	Role	Type
1977	Bluey	Mary Fellows	TV series, 1 episode
1978	The Young Doctors	Sally Brown	TV series, 3 episodes
1978–79	Cop Shop	Sharon Hamilton / Lenice Moses / Shirley Morton	TV series, 5 episodes
1983	Patrol Boat	Judy	TV series, 1 episode
1983	Kings	Donna King	TV series, 3 episodes
1986	Alice to Nowhere	Eve Scott	Miniseries, 2 episodes
1988	The Alien Years	Martha	Miniseries
1988	Joe Wilson	Mary Brand	Miniseries, 3 episodes
1989	The Flying Doctors	Sandra Garvey	TV series, 1 episode
1990	A Country Practice	Kerrie McLeod	TV series, 2 episodes
1991	Police Rescue	Bernadette Kelly	TV series, 1 episode
1996–98	Flipper	Doctor	TV series, 3 episodes
1997	The Wayne Manifesto	Aunt Irene	TV series, 2 episodes
1999	Blue Heelers	Sonia Brookner	TV series, 2 episodes
2001	The Saddle Club	Mrs. Chambers	TV series, season 1, episode 7: "School Horse"
2001	Stingers	Rhonda Ellington	TV series, 1 episode
1996–97	City Homicide	Dr Margaret Manson	TV series, 2 episodes

== Theatre ==
Year	Title	Role	Venue / Co.
1973	Man Alive!	Sales Girl	Loreto Convent, Toorak
1982	The Boy Friend		Churchill Theatre, Bromley
1982	Variations	Alice	Belvoir Street Theatre with Nimrod Theatre Company
1983	Three Sisters	Irina	Melbourne Athenaeum with MTC
1983	The Winter’s Tale		Melbourne Athenaeum with MTC
1988	A Small Family Business		Northside Theatre Company
1992	The Heidi Chronicles	Susan	Cremorne Theatre, Brisbane with Queensland Theatre
1992	Hotel Sorrento	Pippa	Cremorne Theatre, Brisbane with Queensland Theatre
1995	She of the Electrolux (Or a Vacuum in a Room of One's Own)		La Boite Theatre, Brisbane
1995	The Last Yankee		Cremorne Theatre, Brisbane with Queensland Theatre
1996	Sex Diary of an Infidel	Jean	La Boite Theatre, Brisbane

== Awards and nominations ==
Year	Title	Awards	Category	Result
1978	Mouth to Mouth	AACTA Awards	Best Actress in a Leading Role	Nominated
