= Mary Putland =

Australian Lady of Government House

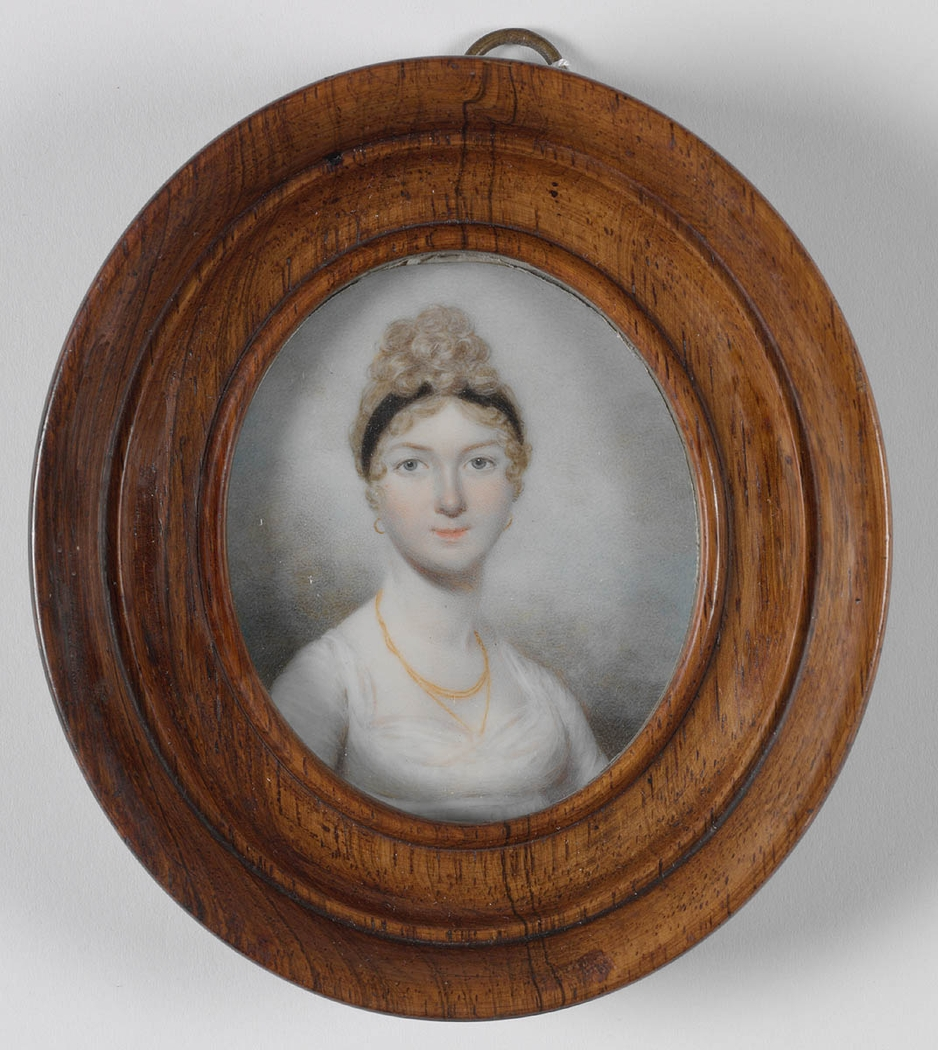
Mary Bligh, circa 1803

Mary Bligh, Lady O'Connell (later Putland and later O'Connell) (1783–1864) was the Lady of Government House, New South Wales, Australia during the period her father William Bligh was the Governor of New South Wales.

== Early life ==
Mary Bligh was born on 1 April 1783 at Douglas, Isle of Man, the daughter of William Bligh and his wife Elizabeth Betham. In 1805, she married John Putland, a lieutenant in the Royal Navy who had served in the victory of the Battle of the Nile under the command of Horatio Nelson.

== Lady of Government House ==
When her father William Bligh was offered the post of Governor of New South Wales, her mother Elizabeth did not wish to accompany him, fearing the long ocean voyage. Instead, Mary agreed to accompany her father to act as the Lady of the Government House with her husband John Putland to serve as William Bligh's aide-de-camp.

On 28 January 1806, Mary Putland and William Bligh left England on the convict transport ship Lady Madeline Sinclair while John Putland travelled as the first officer of the escorting vessel HMS Porpoise under the command of Commander Joseph Short. Bligh and Short disagreed continually through the voyage as each believed he was in charge of the expedition. When Bligh ordered a change of course of the transport ship, Short responded ordering Putland to fire warning shots at the transport containing his wife and father-in-law. In great distress, Putland complied with the order. When the convoy arrived in Sydney Harbour on 6 August 1806, Bligh assumed the governorship of the colony. He retained Porpoise to act as its principal naval unit, ordering Short to return to Britain on HMS Buffalo in disgrace. Bligh then appointed Putland to command Porpoise.

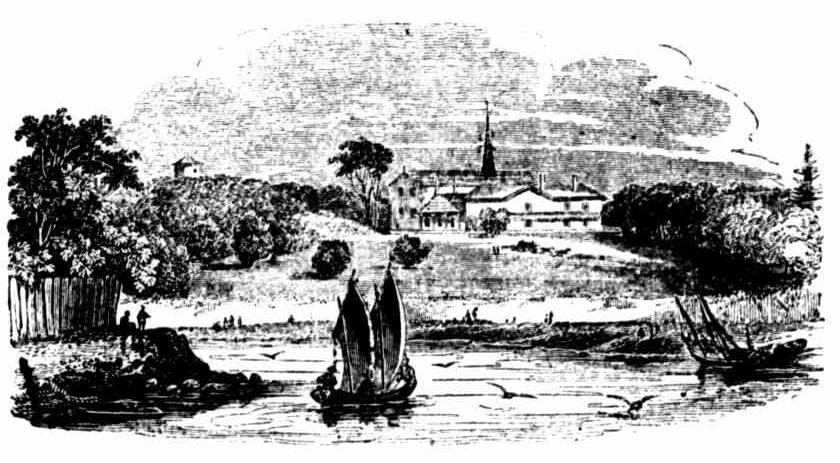
Government House, Sydney, 1833

On arrival in Sydney, Mary Putland took charge of Government House. This was the first Government House in Sydney, built originally for Governor Arthur Phillip although extended on numerous occasions and subsequently demolished in 1845–1846.

Mary Putland hosted many entertainments including dinners and balls. To ensure her high status in Sydney society, her mother, Elizabeth Bligh, kept Mary constantly supplied with the latest fashions from London. In return, Mary sent her mother bird feathers and precious stones from New South Wales.

However, despite her public gaiety, her private life was taken up with concern about her husband's health which deteriorated since their arrival in New South Wales. Her husband John Putland died of tuberculosis on 4 January 1808. He was buried in the grounds of the Government House.

While Mary Putland continued her role as the popular hostess of Government House, her father as governor was not popular with many of the colonists as he attempted to reform society by removing the control exercised by those who had a monopoly over the supply of rum, which had become the de facto currency within the colony. Mary Putland wrote to her mother, "We entertain everyone of importance, but I am sure many of them are secretly against my father".

== Rum Rebellion ==
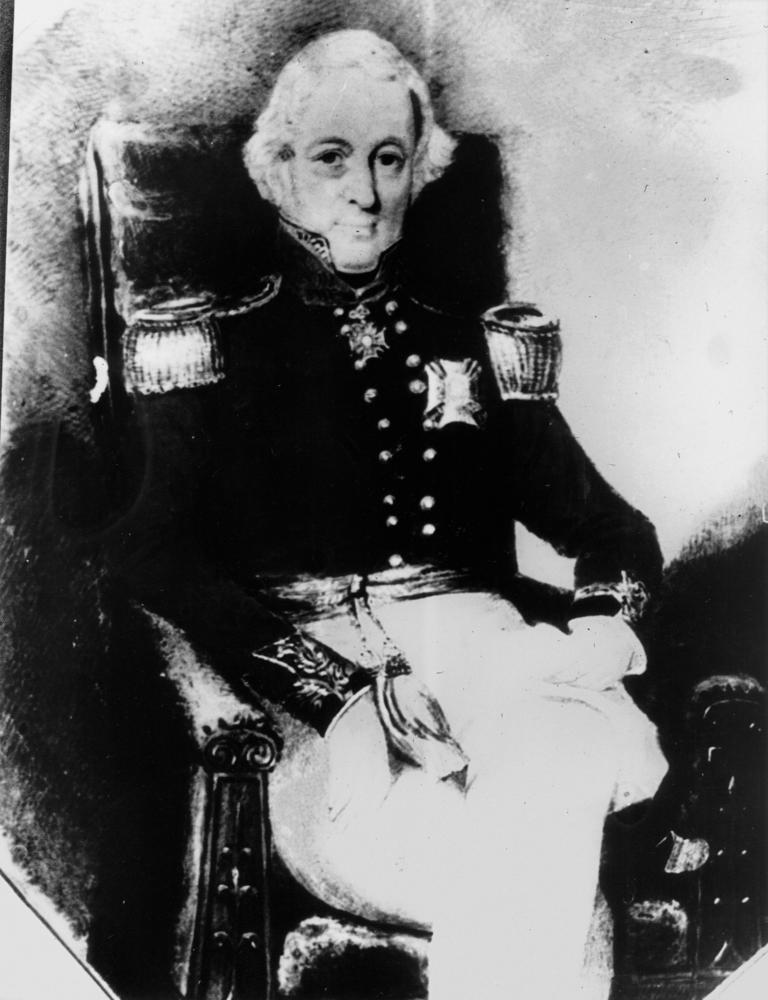
Sir Maurice Charles O'Connell, second husband, circa 1840

In 1808, the power struggle between Governor William Bligh and John Macarthur, one of the leading colonists involved in the trade in rum, came to a head, leading to the Rum Rebellion on 26 January 1808 when the New South Wales Corps deposed Bligh based on a petition of officers and leading colonists. William Bligh and Mary Putland were placed under house arrest. William Bligh refused to leave the colony until he received an official order from London and so they remained under house arrest while John Macarthur became the de facto head of the colony.

In April 1809, the British Government appointed Lachlan Macquarie as Governor of New South Wales. In making this appointment, the British government reversed its practice of appointing naval officers as governor and chose an army commander in the hope that he could secure the co-operation of the unruly New South Wales Corps, and aided by the fact Macquarie arrived in New South Wales at the head of his own military unit, the 73rd Regiment of Foot, led by Maurice Charles O'Connell (also the new Lieutenant-Governor). They arrived in New South Wales on HMS Hindostan and HMS Dromedary. At the head of regular troops, Macquarie was unchallenged by the New South Wales Corps, whose members had become settled in farming, commerce and trade.

William Bligh and Mary Putland were to return to England on Hindostan in May 1810. However, before that occurred, Mary Putland was courted by Maurice Charles O'Connell, encouraged by Macquarie's wife Elizabeth. Only days before the ship was to depart, Maurice O'Connell proposed marriage to Mary. The couple were married quickly on 8 May 1810 at Government House and Mary remained in Sydney with her new husband, while William Bligh returned to England alone.

Although William Bligh had departed, his daughter, now Mary O'Connell, had not forgiven those who had deposed her father. She was prone to creating tensions between her husband and others in the colony, and O'Connell soon came to partake in her feelings and antipathies. In August 1813, Macquarie wrote in a dispatch to Lord Bathurst that, "though lieutenant-colonel O'Connell is naturally a very well disposed man ... it would greatly improve the harmony of the country ... if the whole of the officers and men of the 73 regiment were removed from it". On 26 March 1814, O'Connell and his regiment were transferred to Ceylon.

== Return to New South Wales ==
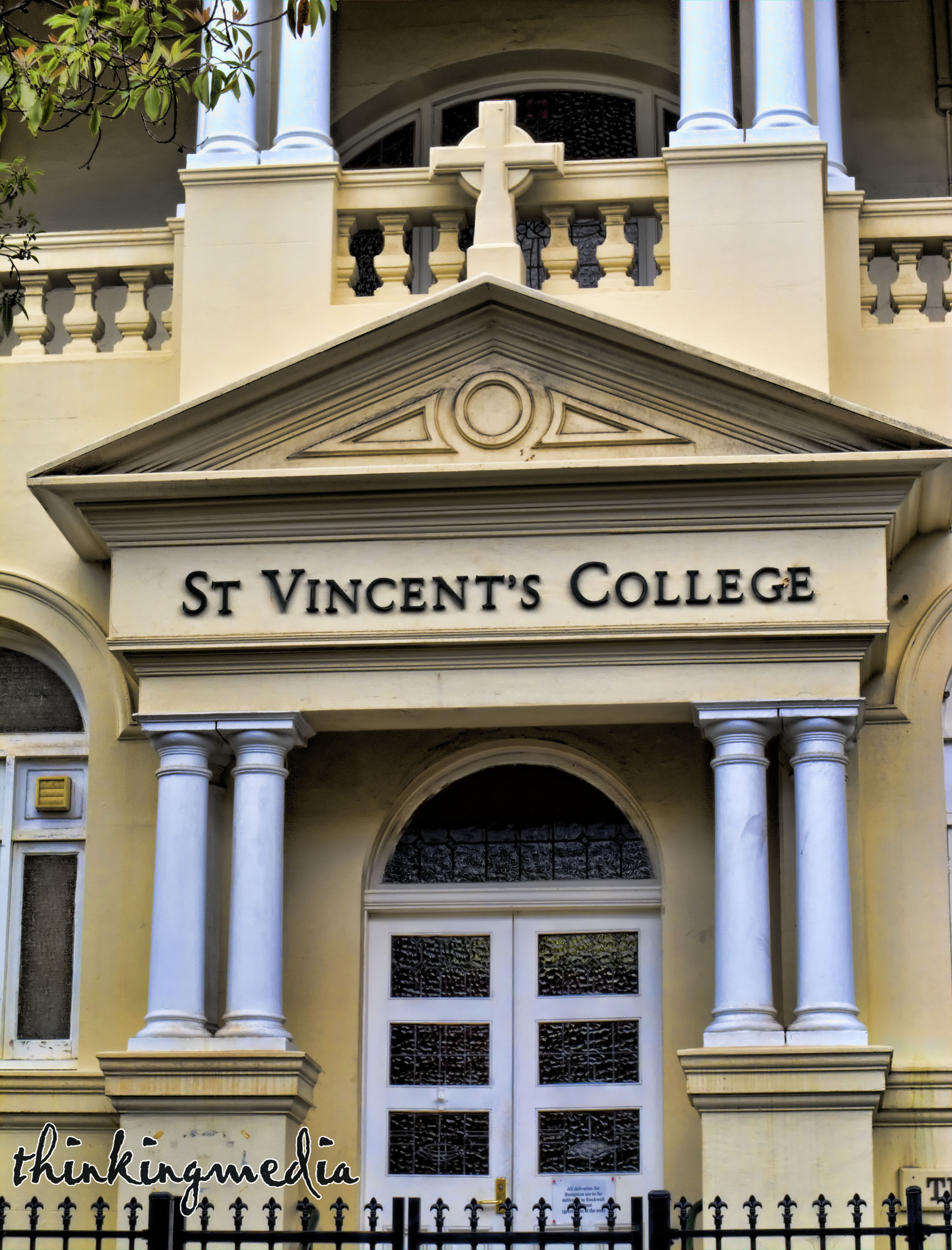
Tarmons, now St Vincent's College, 2012

In 1838, Lady O'Connell returned to Sydney, as her husband, by then Sir Maurice O'Connell, became the major-general of all the troops in New South Wales and a member of the New South Wales Legislative Council. They built their residence, Tarmons, in 1838. In 1841, Maurice O'Connell was promoted to lieutenant general. He served as acting governor in 1845–46, between the terms of Governors George Gipps and Charles Augustus FitzRoy. Once again, Mary was the Lady of Government House, but this time in the recently completed "new" Government House (still in use today as the Governor's residence).

In December 1847, Major-General Wynyard arrived to take charge of the troops. The O'Connells prepared to return to England, but Maurice fell ill before that could happen. Maurice O'Connell died at Tarmons on 25 May 1848, the very day they were due to depart on the Medway.

== Later life ==
After the death of her second husband, Lady O'Connell returned to Europe, living mostly in Paris. She died in London in 1864.

== Legacy ==
Their house Tarmons subsequently became St Vincent's College.

Her life was dramatised in the radio play Bligh Had a Daughter and she was depicted in the radio serial Stormy Petrel and its mini series adaptation of the same name in 1960. She was played in the latter by Delia Williams. In 2023 author Sue Williams published an historical novel "That Bligh Girl" based on Putland's life.
