= The Tempest (1963 film) =

- The Sydney Morning Herald 16 October 1963
- Based on: the play The Tempest by William Shakespeare
- Directed by: Alan Burke
- Starring: Richard Meikle
- Music by: John Antill
- Country of origin: Australia
- Original language: English

Production
- Running time: 90 mins

Original release
- Release: 16 October 1963

The Tempest is an Australian television play, an adaptation of the play by William Shakespeare. Directed by Alan Burke, it stars Reg Livermore. The play aired on 16 October 1963 in Sydney.

== Cast ==
- Max Oldaker as Prospero
- Joan Morrow as Miranda
- Reg Livermore as Ariel
- Owen Weingott as Caliban
- Walter Sullivan as Antonio
- Ron Haddrick as Alonso
- Walter Pym as Sebastian
- Edmund Pegge as Ferdinand
- Gordon Glenwright as Stephano
- John Armstrong as Trinculo
- David Bradbury as Gonzalo
- Joy Parkin, Beverly Bohan and Valentine Price as the singers in "The Masque"
- James Elliott

== Production ==
Max Oldaker was an actor who had been in retirement in Launceston, Tasmania. He travelled from there to Sydney especially for the play. Reg Livermore says on the first day of rehearsal Oldaker was word perfect. "Max was apprehensive about Shakespeare I guessed," wrote Livermore adding the actor "had been much more at home in the world of musical comedy."

Ariel has two songs. John Antil wrote the music for this which Livermore described as "extremely contemporary but awkward". Livermore rehearsed the songs with Antil and the Sydney Symphony Orchestra.

Keith Bain did choreography for the six dancers. Livermore wore tight shorts and his body was covered in silver paint. His character had to "fly" during the production so he had to perform his scenes off to one side while superimposed on the action. "I had to get my line of sight correct when it came to addressing the other characters of course," wrote Livermore, "which meant I ended up talking to the floor; it was quite tricky and not much fun."

== Reception ==
The Sydney Morning Herald said the trick photography used had "mixed results" but praised the acting.

== Notes ==
- Livermore, Reg; McMicking, Rob (2003). Chapters and Chances. Hardie Grant Books.
