= Freeman Cobb =

American entrepreneur (1830–1878)

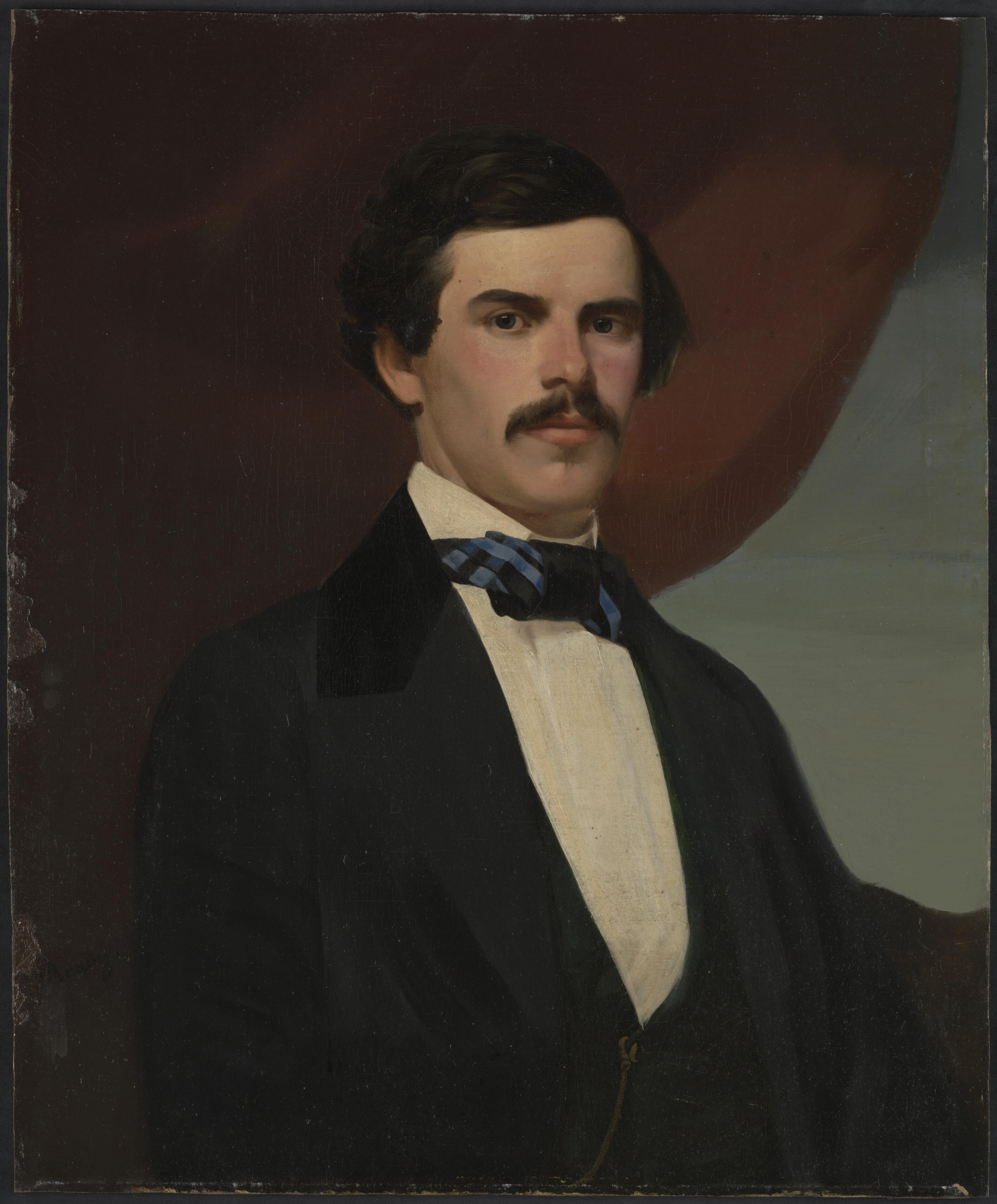
Cobb c. 1858

Freeman Cobb (10 October 1830 – 24 May 1878) was an American, born in Brewster, Massachusetts, who established the Cobb & Co stagecoach company in 1853, with partners John Murray Peck, James Scanlon and John B. Lamber. The company was based in Melbourne, Victoria, Australia, and used Concord coaches, imported from America, to provide services to and from the Victorian goldfields.

== Early life ==
Cobb was born on 10 October 1830 in Brewster, Massachusetts. He was the son of Hannah (née Crosby) and Freeman Cobb senior.

Cobb was educated in Boston. At the age of 16 he joined Witherell, Stow & Wood, a dry goods firm, with whom he worked for three years. In 1849, he joined Adams & Company, an express delivery firm, and was employed on the company's coach lines in California and Central America.

== Australia ==
In 1853, following the Victorian gold rush, Cobb was sent to Melbourne to set up a branch of Adams & Company. In partnership with several other Americans, he instead established his own carrying firm, Cobb & Co, using two Concord coaches which he had brought with him from the United States. Although he only lived in Australia for three years, "his name has passed into the Australian language as a synonym for a coach" and he was known for "his enterprise in introducing the latest American methods and equipment into the coaching industry of Victoria when the gold rushes had created a vast demand for passenger transport"

== South Africa ==
In 1871, Cobb took his family to South Africa to establish a Cobb & Co Ltd stagecoach service with Charles Cole, who had operated Cobb & Co coaches in New Zealand and Japan. The new company started operating between Port Elizabeth and the new diamond fields at Kimberley. Cobb died at Port Elizabeth in 1878.

== Personal life ==
In 1858, Cobb married his cousin Annette Cobb, with whom he had one son and one daughter. He suffered a bout of rheumatic fever as a young man which left him "permanently lame".

== In popular culture ==
Cobb was the model for "Chris Cobb", lead character of the Australian TV series Whiplash, which premiered on Channel Seven on 18 February 1961, and starred Peter Graves as Cobb.
