= The Loquat Tree =

1961 play by Barbara Vernon

- Genre: drama play
- Running time: 60 mins
- Country of origin: Australia
- Language: English
- Syndicates: ABC
- Written by: Barbara Vernon
- Original release: November 12, 1961

The Loquat Tree is a 1961 Australian radio play by Barbara Vernon. The original production starred Moral Powell and Delia Williams.

The play was popular and was produced again in 1962, 1965 and 1970.

It was produced by the BBC in 1964, which was rare for Australian plays.

== Premise ==
Jim Emerson, an older farmer, sees his land cut up for soldier settler blocks. He is upset when an inspector orders him to cut down a loquat tree that has been on his property for generations.
