= The Outcasts (Australian TV series) =

- Ad from SMH 28 May 1961
- Genre: History
- Created by: Rex Rienits
- Directed by: Colin Dean
- Starring: Ron Haddrick
- Country of origin: Australia
- Original language: English
- No. of seasons: 1
- No. of episodes: 12

Production
- Running time: 30 mins

Original release
- Network: ABC
- Release: 28 May – 10 September 1961

Related
- Stormy Petrel; The Patriots

The Outcasts is a 1961 Australian television serial. A period drama, it was broadcast live, though with some film inserts. All 12 episodes of the serial survive as kinescope recordings. It was a sequel to Stormy Petrel.

== Plot ==
The Outcasts told the story of William Redfern and his attempts to build a hospital in Sydney in 1808.

== Cast ==
- Ron Haddrick as William Redfern
- Henry Gilbert as Governor Lachlan Macquarie
- John Gray as Reverend Samuel Marsden
- Neil Fitzpatrick as Martin O'Brien
- Amber Mae Cecil as Sarah Willis/Redfern
- Lyndall Barbour as Mrs Willis
- Frank Waters as Edward Willis
- Ben Gabriel as Dr Jamieson
- Edward Howell as Dr D'Arcy Wentworth
- Margo Lee as Mrs John MacArthur
- Leonard Bullen as JT Campbell
- John Unicomb as HC Antill
- Lynne Murphy as Mrs Macquarie
- Walter Sullivan as John MacArthur
- Delia Williams as Mary O'Connell
- Philip Ross as W.C. Wentworth
- Carolyn Keely as Eliza Antill
- James Condon as Maurice O'Connell
- Al Thomas as Francis Greenway
- Joe Coco as Surgeon Bohan
- Max Osbiston as Edward Eagar
- Madeleine Howell as Woman Shopper
- John Fegan as Flagellator
- Julian Flett as Butler
- Stan Polonski
- Sophy Milo
- Patricia Johnson
- Les Brooks
- Arthur Jollow
- Alan Graham

== Episodes ==
| No. | Title | Sydney air date | Melbourne air date |
|---|---|---|---|
| 1 | "The New Governor" | 28 May 1961 | 25 June 1961 |
In September 1808, former convict William Redfern is admitted as a surgeon in New South Wales. He helps Governor Macquarie when the latter's wife is pregnant and clashes with Reverend Samuel Marsden. Sarah Willis wishes to marry Redfern.
| 2 | "Bond and Free" | 4 June 1961 | 2 July 1961 |
Macquarie and Marsden argue over whether to invite Redfern to dinner. The invitation impresses Edward Willis, a wealthy settler who did not approve of Redfern and his daughter.
| 3 | "The Vision Grows" | 11 June 1961 | 9 July 1961 |
| 4 | "Re enter John MacArthur" | 18 June 1961 | 16 July 1961 |
| 5 | "The System" | 25 June 1961 | 23 July 1961 |
| 6 | "Barrier Breached" | 2 July 1961 | 30 July 1961 |
The Blue Mountains are crossed
| 7 | "Barrier Breached" | 9 July 1961 | 6 August 1961 |
A son for Governor Macquarie is born
| 8 | "The Trouble Makers" | 16 July 1961 | 13 August 1961 |
Redfern and Sarah move into their new hospital.
| 9 | "The Exile's Return" | 23 July 1961 | 20 August 1961 |
MacArthur returns to the Colony.
| 10 | "The Showdown" | 30 July 1961 | 27 August 1961 |
Macquarie's administration is investigated
| 11 | "The Final Challenge" | 6 August 1961 | 3 September 1961 |
Gilbert's appointment is opposed
| 12 | "Victory" | 13 August 1961 | 10 September 1961 |

== Production ==
Stormy Petrel, written by Rex Rienits and Colin Dean, had been a big success for the ABC. In November 1960 it was announced Dean and Rienits would reunite for a serial about William Redfern.

In March 1961 Dean said "it has not quite the clear, dramatic line of 'Stormy Petrel'. It involves more people, and although it lacks the central issue of the rebellion, much more happens in 'The Outcasts,' which covers from 1808 to 1822. 'The Outcasts' illustrates the change in the colony – Macquarie's policy of building up a settlement rather than administering it as a penal colony."

There was a cast of 42. A huge set was built to replicate George Street. Star Ron Haddrick was best known for his theatre work at the time.

== Reception ==
Reviewing the pilot episode the Sunday Sydney Morning Herald said "ABN 2 looks as though its done it again... I would say that it has another winner and one that might outclass its predecessor...It hasn't yet got as strong a central figure as Bligh... but, on the other hand, it set the pace and established the theme much more rapidly than the Bligh series which was a little slow to develop."

The Woman's Weekly said the story "seems closer to present-day Australia in its lasting effects than the Bligh rebellion, with its high life at Government House, its turbulence, and its drama. "The Outcasts" is a quieter story, made up of more of the everyday events of life... "The Outcasts" is interesting and excellent TV. I know I'll make great efforts not to miss an episode."

Malcolm Ellis of The Bulletin wrote, "For those who like their historical drama presented in the Alfred Dampier manner, with shouting, weeping, oppression of the weak, all the characters pure-white or pure-black in morals and the dialogue scissored out of volumes seven to ten of the "Historical Records of Australia", the series is good, clean fun. But viewers should not take them as historical gospel." (Filmink magazine noted producer-writer Brian Wright wrote a response to Ellis defending Rienits, "to which Ellis wrote a whiny hysterical response, as critics often do when called out. How dare the ABC publicity make a claim of authenticity to Malcolm Ellis! How dare they! Historians can get very possessive and mean whenever someone else does a work on "their" area of history")

Filmink magazine argued:

The series lacks the clean narrative drive of Stormy Petrel, which built up to a big confrontation between two conflicting parties (i.e. The Rum Rebellion). This one is more sprawling and less focused, with a greater number of sub-plots and extraneous characters, and more of an overall theme. Instead of being a story about two hot-tempered alpha males slogging it out, The Outcasts has more of a solemn "we are making history here" vibe with characters talking a lot about what they envision Australia’s future to be.

== Sequel ==
In January 1962 the ABC announced there would be a third series, making it a historical trilogy. It would focus on Darling versus Wentworth.
