= Barbara Vernon (writer) =

Australian playwright, screenwriter and radio announcer

- Born: Barbara Mary Vernon; 25 July 1916; Inverell, New South Wales, Australia
- Died: 16 April 1978 (age 61); Darlinghurst, New South Wales, Australia
- Occupations: Playwright/dramatist; screenwriter; radio announcer; personnel of the Women's Auxiliary Australian Air Force
- Years active: – 1976 (retired)
- Known for: Bellbird (TV series), Country Town (film adaptation)

Barbara Mary Vernon (25 July 1916 – 16 April 1978) was an Australian playwright, screenwriter, editor and radio announcer.

Her plays included The Passionate Pianist and The Multi-Coloured Umbrella.

She was the head writer and script editor of the ABC TV drama series Bellbird, the longest such series produced by the ABC, she also wrote the film adaptation of that series entitled Country Town.

== Biography ==
Vernon was born on 25 July 1916, Inverell, New South Wales the youngest child of four to medical practitioner Murray Menzies Vernon and Constance Emma Elliot (née Barling). She attended the New England School in Armidale, New South Wales, before entering the Women's Auxiliary Australian Air Force in 1943, rising to rank of Corporal, before being discharged in 1946. She joined radio the Northern Broadcasters radio station radio 2NZ. Vernon started to write plays because she was involved with amateur drama and they could not afford to pay for the copyright of plays.

Her first play was "Naked Possum" in 1956, staged by Dame Doris Fitton, her second professionally performed play was the award-winning "The Multi-Coloured Umbrella" and this was the first hour-long Australian play broadcast on Australian television.

Vernon retired in 1976 and died from cardiomyopathy in Darlinghurst, New South Wales on 16 April 1978 at St Vincent's Hospital aged 61.

== Select works ==
- Naked Possum (1956) – play
- The Passionate Pianist (1957) – adapted for TV.
- The Multi-Coloured Umbrella (1958) – adapted for TV in 1958
- The Questing Heart (1960) – radio serial
- The Loquat Tree (1961) – radio play
- Bellbird (1967) – head writer, script editor
- The Sleeping Planet (1968) – play
- Pastures of the Blue Crane (1969) (TV series) – script editor
- Lane End (TV series) (1972) – head writer, script editor
- Certain Women – contributions as editor (unknown episodes)
