= Cobb & Co =

Australian stagecoach company

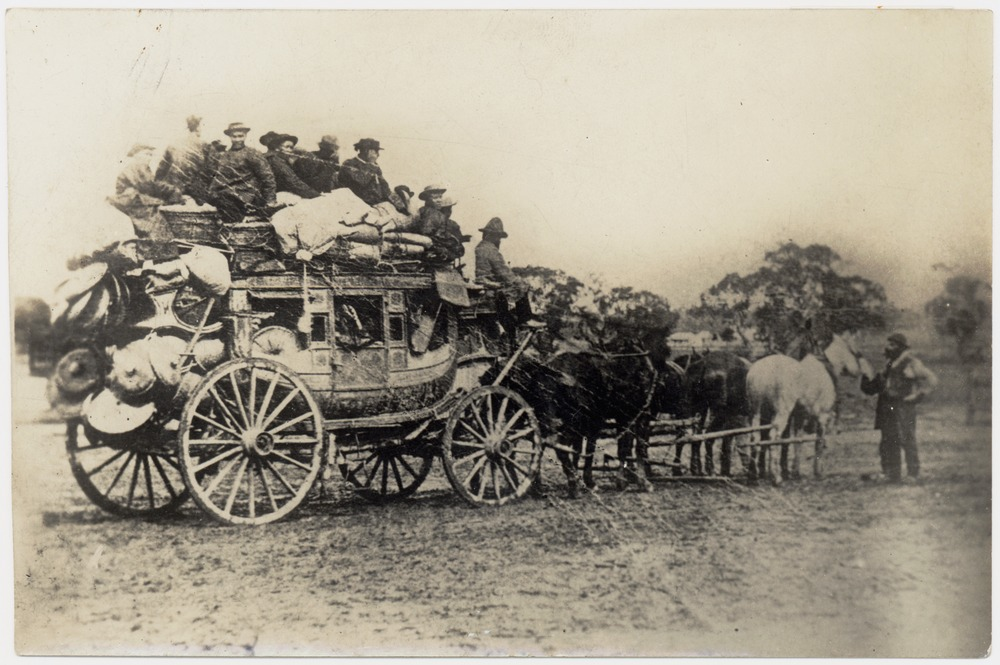
- Chinese passengers leaving for the diggings by Cobb & Co. coach, Castlemaine, Victoria. State Library of Victoria, Picture Collection.
- Type: Private
- Genre: Transport
- Founded: 1853
- Founder: Freeman Cobb; John Murray Peck; James Swanton; John B Lamber
- Defunct: 1927

Cobb & Co was the name used by several independent Australian coach businesses. The first company to use 'Cobb & Co' was established in 1853 by American Freeman Cobb and his partners. The name grew to great prominence in the late 19th century, when it was carried by many stagecoaches carrying passengers and mail to various Australian goldfields, and later to regional and remote areas of the Australian outback. The same name was used in New Zealand and Freeman Cobb used it in South Africa.

Although the Queensland branch of the company made an effort to transition to automobiles in the early 20th century, high overhead costs and the growth of alternative transport options for mail, including rail and air, saw the final demise of Cobb & Co. The last Australian Cobb & Co stagecoach ran in Queensland in August 1924.

Cobb & Co has become an established part of Australian folklore commemorated in art, literature and on screen. Parallels may be drawn between Australia's Cobb & Co and America’s Wells Fargo stagecoach services, both of which played similar and important roles in their respective countries' histories. Today, the name 'Cobb & Co' is used by a number of Australian bus operators.

== Establishment ==
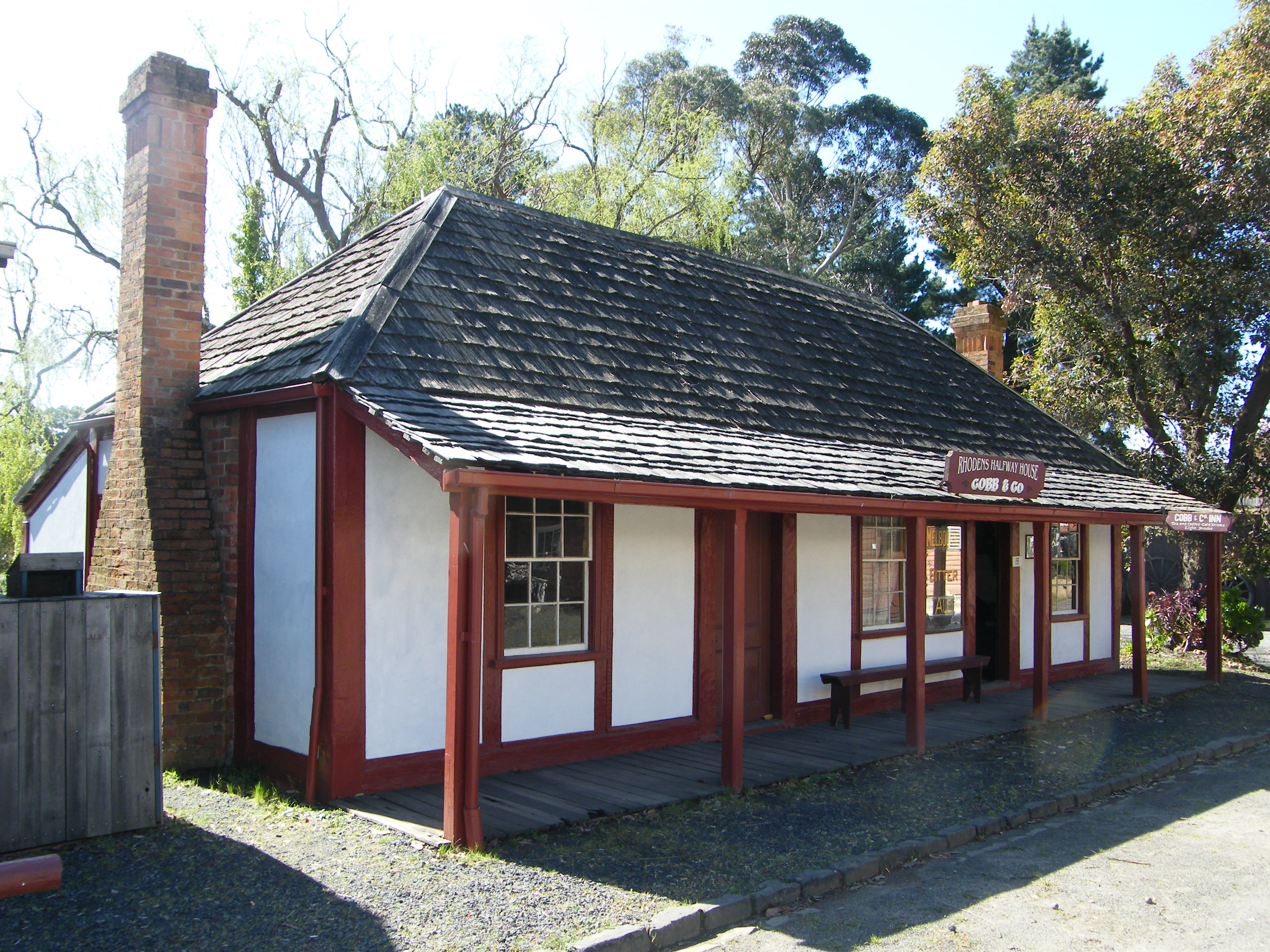
Rhoden's Halfway House, Old Gippstown, built in 1863 at Pakenham for the Cobb & Co Gippsland route

The original Cobb & Co was established in Melbourne in 1853 at the height of the excitement created by the Victorian goldrushes by four newly arrived Americans – Freeman Cobb, John Murray Peck, James Swanton and John B. Lamber. At first they traded as the "American Telegraph Line of Coaches", a name that emphasized speed and progressiveness. With financial support from another newly arrived US businessman George Train, they arranged the importation of several US-built wagons and Concord stagecoaches. By early 1854, Cobb & Co operated a daily service to Forest Creek and Bendigo and, soon afterwards, expanded the service to Geelong, as well as other goldfields such as Ballarat.

Cobb & Co's horses were changed at stages every 10–15 miles along a stagecoach "line" often at inns or hotels that could also cater for the needs of drivers and passengers. As historian Susan Priestley notes, "Coach lines did not attempt to compete with... railways. Instead, as rail lines extended, coaches were transferred to feeder routes and were timetabled to link in with trains."

Within a few years, Cobb & Co had established a reputation for efficiency, speed and reliability, although they had not won any of the lucrative mail contracts. Their imported Concord stagecoaches used thorough-brace technology, on which thick straps of leather suspended the body of the vehicle, providing passengers with greater comfort on the rough country roads when compared to coaches with traditional steel-springs.

== Under James Rutherford ==
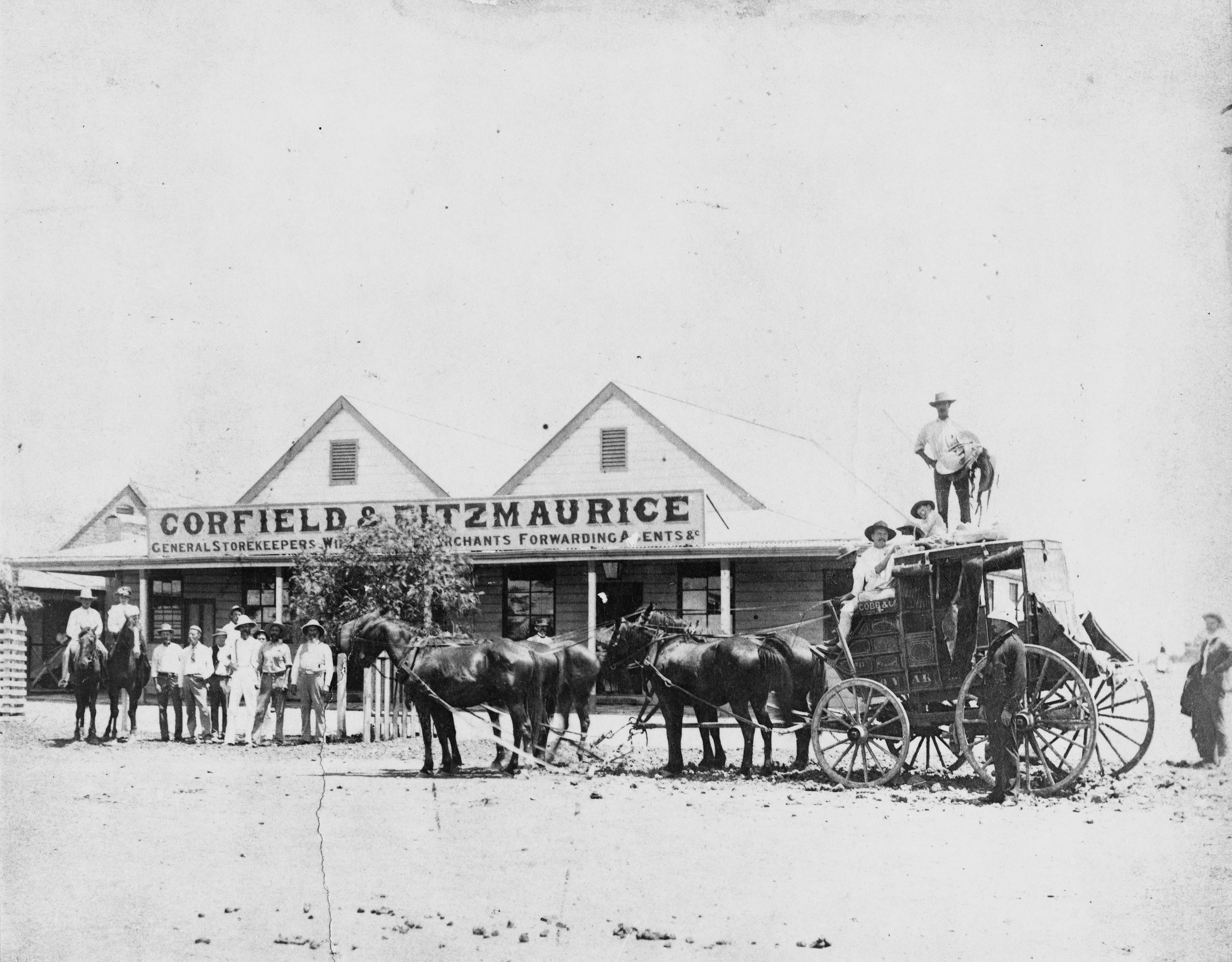
Cobb & Co coach at Winton, Queensland c 1890. John Oxley Library, State Library of Queensland

In May 1856, the four partners sold out. Cobb and Lamber returned to the US while Swanton continued in coaching for a few more years. John Peck stayed in Melbourne, eventually establishing a stock and station agency. Passing through the hands of a number of owners, Cobb & Co rose to greater prominence after 1861 when it was bought by a consortium of partners led by another North American, James Rutherford, who like Cobb had arrived during the gold rush. Rutherford's partners included Alexander William Robertson, John Wagner, Walter Russell Hall, William Franklin Whitney and Walter Bradley. Rutherford re-organised and extended the Victorian services and won a monopoly on major mail contracts. By 1870 most of Victoria was serviced by a network of coach routes.

In 1860, Cobb & Co introduced its massive "Leviathan" coach on the Geelong-Ballarat service. Built in Ballarat by Morgan's coach works, "Leviathan" could accommodate up to sixty passengers and was drawn by a team of eight horses. The interior was fitted with five benches, and included a ladies' compartment in the front. There were a further seven benches on the roof.

== Expansion into NSW and Queensland ==
In June 1862, Rutherford oversaw the extension of the business into New South Wales following news of the Lambing Flat gold rush. Rutherford moved ten coaches from Bendigo to Bathurst with great publicity to announce and establish Cobb & Co's presence. Bathurst became the headquarters of a new syndicate led by Rutherford and four others. Rutherford had intended to spend 6 months in Bathurst, but stayed on to the end of his days, becoming one of the city's leading citizens. Rutherford established a Cobb & Co buggy and coachworks in Bathurst, and the firm also began to invest in properties — the first being "Buckiinguy" station near Nyngan, New South Wales. On the road, Cobb & Co began buying out or forcing out many New South Wales competitors.

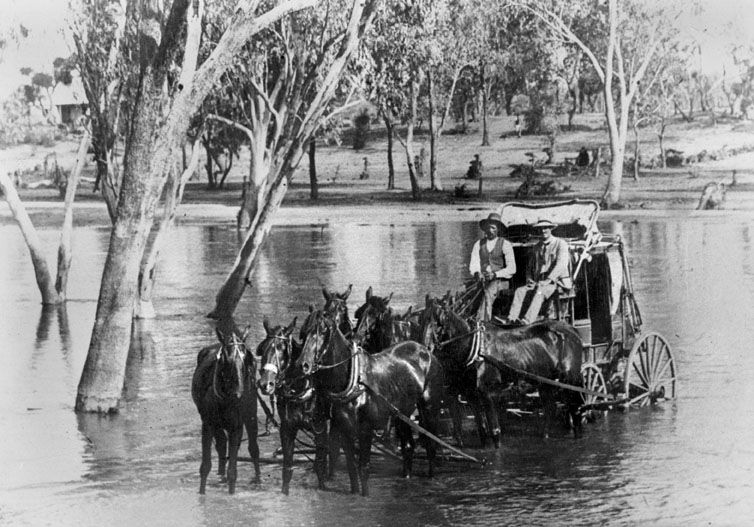
Cobb & Co Coach, Kallangur, Queensland, unknown date

In 1865 Cobb & Co again expanded, this time into Queensland. The first Cobb & Co service in Queensland was between Ipswich and Brisbane. In 1868, a service between Brisbane and Gympie commenced, running twice a week. Services soon expanded into all parts of Queensland and otherwise isolated communities were able to maintain regular contact with the rest of the world. In 1881 the business was transferred to a limited liability company with a capital of £50,000. The largest transport enterprise in Queensland it ran some 3000 horses a total of around 10,000 miles a week. A large coachworks was established at Charleville in 1886. It turned out a variety of vehicles including over 120 coaches.

In 1871, the formal links between the Victorian Cobb & Co (taken over by Robertson and Wagner) and Rutherford's New South Wales and Queensland operation were finally dissolved, although harmonious relations continued. In Victoria coaches carrying the name "Cobb & Co" were operated by four local coaching firms running particular routes by mutual agreement and cooperation. In time, successive operators of the various Victorian stagecoach lines would continue to use the trading name Cobb & Co.

In the 1870s, the fare for the 460km journey from Dalby to Roma in Queensland, was about £5 per day with an additional two shillings and sixpence (£-/2/6) for each meal and bed. A driver's wage was in the vicinity of £10 to £14 per week, with free meals.

== Beyond Eastern Australia ==
In the separate colony of South Australia an independent Cobb & Co Limited took over the South Australian mail and coach business of William Rounsevell in 1866 after several years of ruinous competition. Its ownership was held by four interests of a quarter each. One quarter by Canadians, Peleg Whitford Jackson & Jasper Bingham Meggs; one quarter by Fuller, Hill & Co; one quarter by Joseph Darwent and one quarter by Rounsevell's son Ben Rounsevell. This business was taken over by John Hill and Company and years later was merged into Graves, Hill & Co.

Such was the renown of Cobb & Co that the name was also used on coaches operating beyond Australia. Charles Cole, and Henry and Charles Hoyt, who had operated coaches in Victoria, started businesses using the same name in New Zealand in 1863 and, very briefly, in Japan in 1868.

Although he never returned to Australia, Freeman Cobb took his family to South Africa in 1871 to establish a Cobb & Co Ltd stagecoach service with Charles Cole, operating between Port Elizabeth and the new diamond fields at Kimberley. He died at Port Elizabeth in 1878.

== Cobb & Co in folklore ==
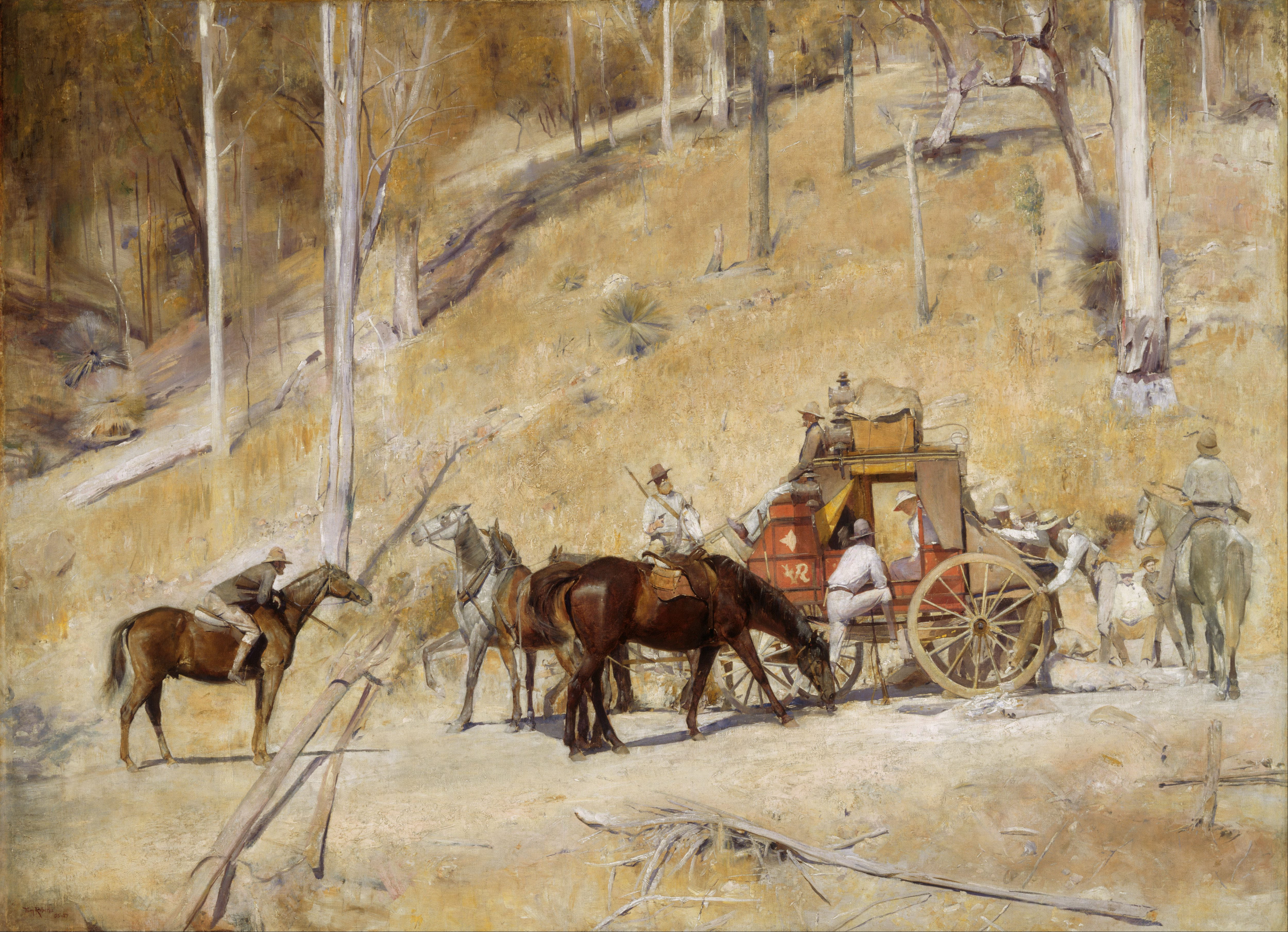
Tom Roberts' 1895 painting "Bailed Up," painted near Inverell, NSW

Through the later 19th century travel by Cobb & Co coach was increasingly romanticized in literature but when Henry Lawson wrote the famous poem forewarning of its demise; The Lights of Cobb & Co in 1897, the days of coaching were already coming to an end in Victoria and New South Wales and Australia was an increasingly urbanised society. The nationalistic art, music and writing of late 19th-century Australia romanticized a pioneering rural or "bush myth" and Cobb & Co with its colourful drivers and managers easily fell into this tradition. Writer Sam Everingham also notes that Cobb & Co was "the first great home grown service provider Australia had known... Born out of the country's gold rushes, the name Cobb & Co has come to represent the pioneering spirit, a willingness to battle against the odds, to reliably connect far-flung communities."

Carrying cash and gold, coaches were famously a regular target of bushrangers. Everingham notes that Cobb & Co's expansion into New South Wales coincided with an increase in the number of armed hold-ups by bushrangers. At least nine coaches were attacked in the Bathurst district in the seven months after the company established itself there.

Tom Roberts, a key member of the Heidelberg School, painted "Bailed Up" near Inverell in 1895 modelling the figures on "local townspeople including (Cobb & Co) stagecoach driver 'Silent Bob Bates' who had been held up by local bushranger Captain Thunderbolt three decades earlier."

== Demise ==
Cobb & Co's operations across Australia were eventually superseded by the expansion of railway networks, the arrival of cheap, reliable automobiles and the emergence of air mail. In 1920, the Charleville coachworks closed and by 1921, Cobb & Co in Queensland had lost most of its mail contracts running out of Charleville. The company also had a vast amount of debt due to over-expansion into industries like wool. Rutherford had died in 1911 the same year the Company approved its first purchase of motor vehicles. In New South Wales the last coach probably ran on the Hebel-Goodooga-Brewarrina routes in 1913 while the last coach ran in Victoria from Casterton to Mount Gambier in 1916. Australia's last horse-drawn stagecoach service was run by Cobb & Co from Surat to Yuleba in Queensland on 14 August 1924. With the rapid decline in wool prices in 1929, Cobb & Co Queensland finally went into liquidation.

Gordon Studdert, a former employee, kept the Cobb & Co name as his Surat store business name until his death in 1955. Following a legal case and settlement with Studdert, the Cobb & Co name was acquired by the Redmans Transport company of Toowoomba, run by Bill Bolton MBE (1905–1973). Bolton also collected and preserved several Cobb & Co. horse-drawn coaches, now in the Toowoomba-based museum.

The 598-kilometre (372 mi) Cobb Highway in western New South Wales commemorates Cobb & Co.

== Preserved coaches ==
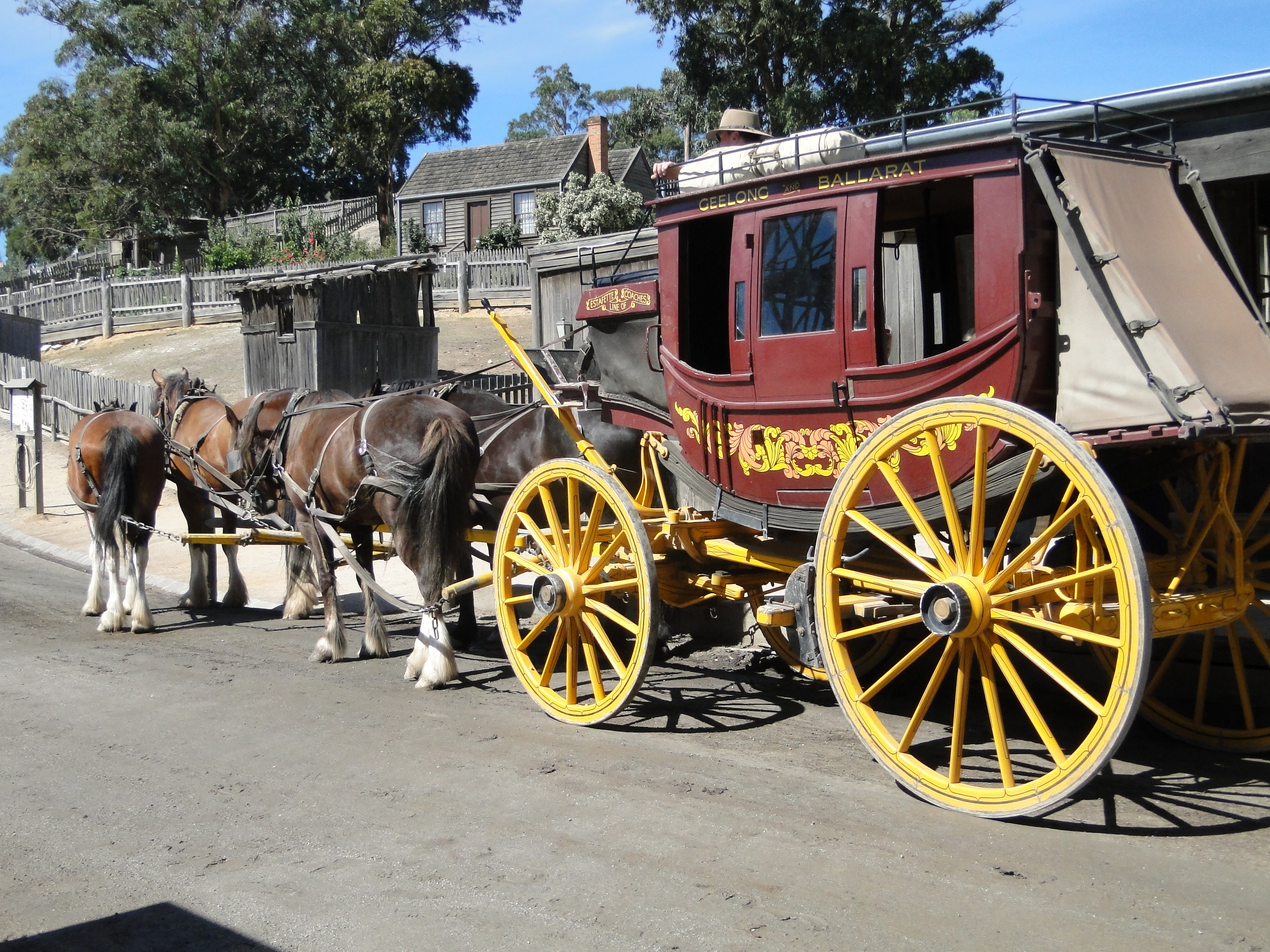
A replica concord coach at Sovereign Hill, Ballarat

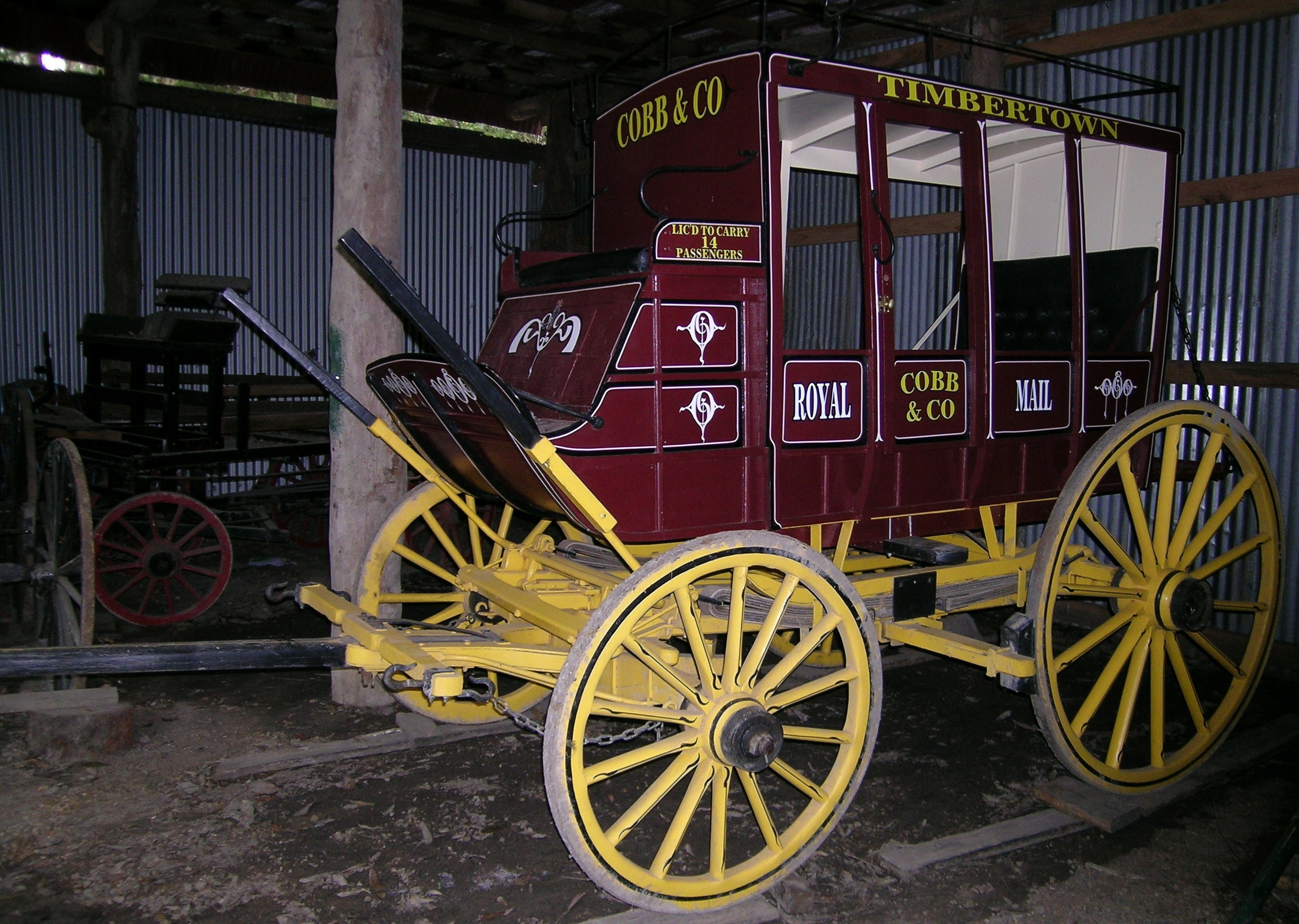
A replica Cobb & Co coach at Timbertown

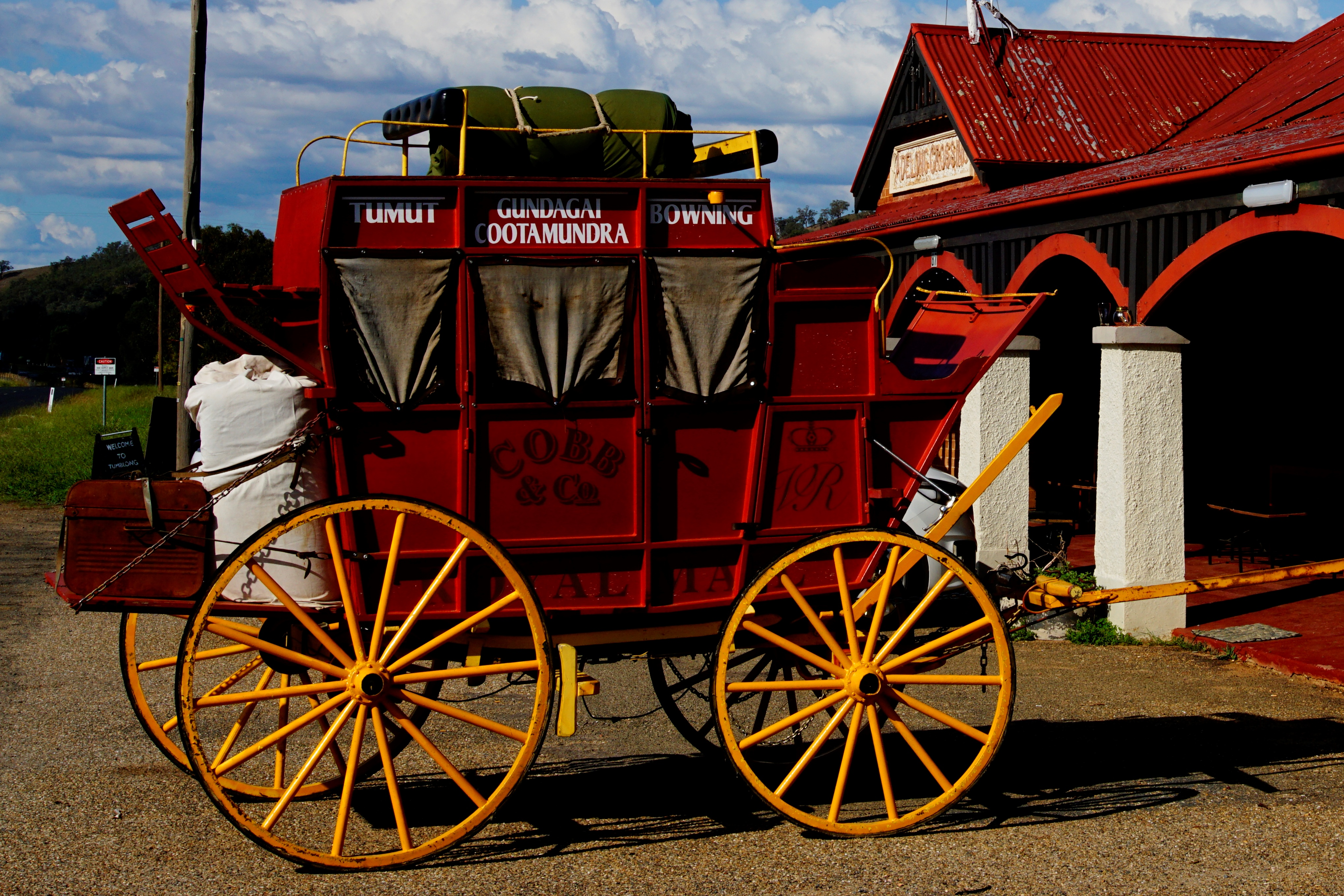
Cobb & Co coach at Tumblong, NSW

Only one Concord or "Jack" coach of the type imported from the United States by Cobb & Co in the 1850s and 1860s survives. According to Deborah Tranter, while Australian built stagecoaches utilized the thorough-brace technology found on the Concord coach, they were generally smaller, lighter, straighter in line and had less room for passengers than the US coaches. Coaches built at the Charleville coachworks were generally designed for either 8 or 14 passengers.

In addition to reproductions, a number of original Cobb & Co stagecoaches still exist in varying states of preservation. Often repainted in the 20th century, the provenance of some is now difficult to determine.

These include:

- An imported "Concord" coach built by Abbot-Downing Company of New Hampshire. Imported by F.B. Clapp and Co, c1869 and used in the Ballarat area. It is preserved in original condition and held by Museum Victoria
- Another stagecoach, possibly built in Geelong, Victoria c1880, is held by Museum Victoria. It is believed to have been the last mail coach to operate commercially in Victoria — in 1916.
- Two stagecoaches, numbered 48 and 100, built in Charleville, Queensland in the late 19th century, are in the National Carriage Collection at the Cobb & Co Museum in Toowoomba.
- Another stagecoach built in Charleville, Queensland, c1890 is preserved at the Powerhouse Museum in Sydney.
- An Australian-built stagecoach, possibly also built at the Cobb & Co factory in Charleville in the late 19th century, is in the collection of the National Museum of Australia in Canberra. Often described as the "Nowlands Coach," it was owned and operated by Nowlands Line of Coaches in the Liverpool Plains district.
- An Australian built stagecoach is in the Western Australian Museum at Kalgoorlie.
- A locally built stagecoach is on public display in the main street of Hay, New South Wales.
- A stagecoach built in Bathurst is on display in the Visitor Information Centre, Bathurst, New South Wales. This was built by Don Burns and family of Narromine.
- A stagecoach is on display at the Cambridge Downs Heritage Display Centre, Richmond, Queensland.

== Other remembrances ==
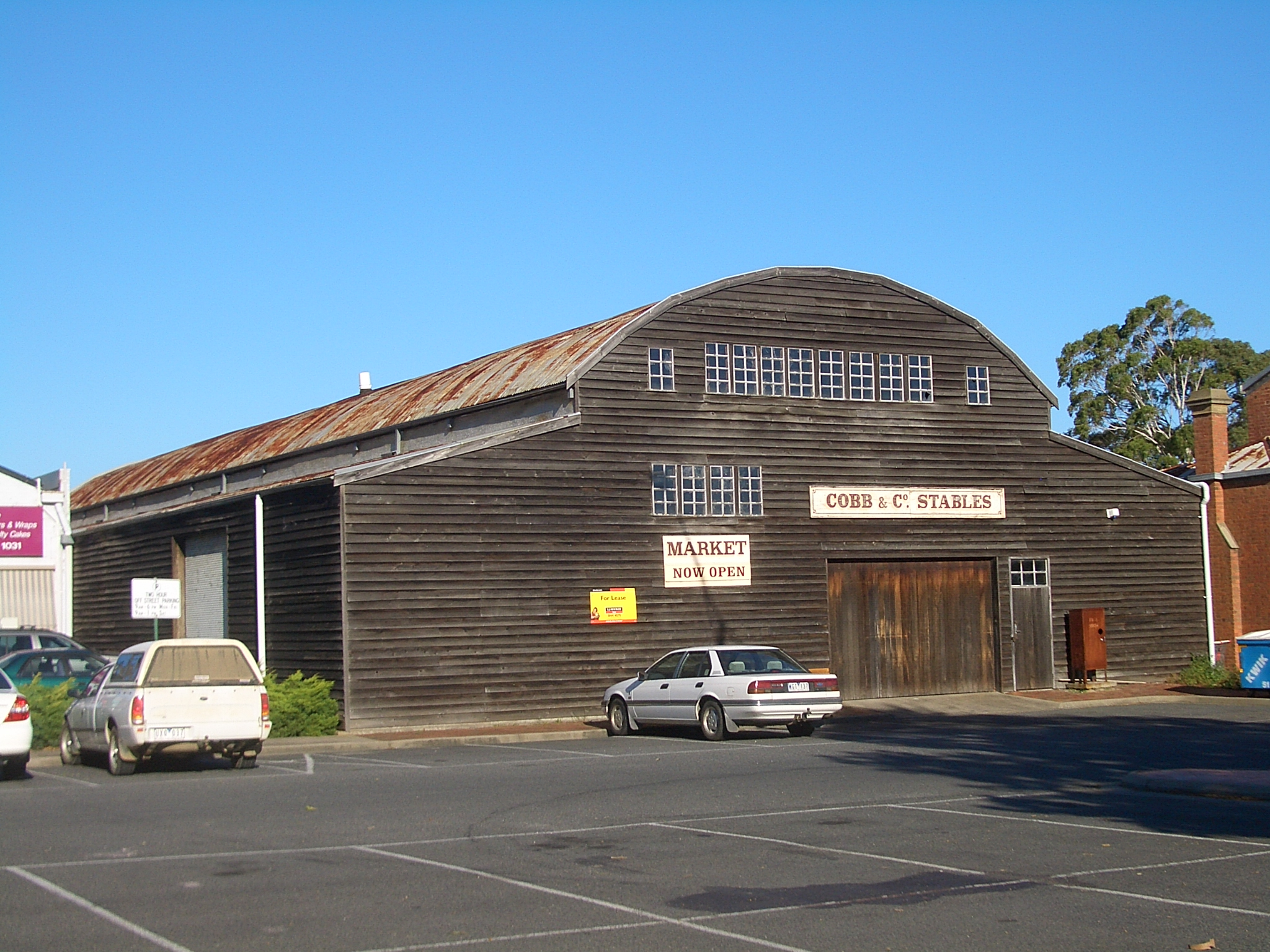
Cobb & Co Stables in Sale, Victoria

- Scottish-Australian poet and bush balladeer Will H. Ogilvie (1869–1963) mentions Cobb & Co in his poem How the Fire Queen crossed the swamp, as well as the self-named poem, The lights of Cobb and Co..
- Lionel Long wrote and sang The Ballad of Cobb & Co, at one time available on LPs Australia — Our Land, Our Music now on double CD: EMI – 8146732 or Axis CDAX 701475
- The television series Whiplash was inspired by the life of Freeman Cobb and starred Peter Graves as "Christopher Cobb."
- A major residential road in Oxenford, Queensland is named Cobb & Co. Drive.

== Centenary festival ==
The Cobb & Co Festival (Australia's Last Run) was held on 16–25 August 2024, celebrating 100 years since the last horse-drawn stagecoach service from Surat to Yuleba on 14 August 1924. An estimated 20,000 people attended the festival. It included a re-enactment of the last stagecoach journey from Surat to Yuleba using a replica Cobb & Co coach leading a cavalcade of more than 300 people travelling on horseback, buggies, wagons and bullocks.

== See also ==
- Coach (carriage)
- Cobb & Co Museum, Toowoomba
- Cobb & Co. (New Zealand)
