= Serpent in the Rainbow =

- Genre: historical family drama
- Written by: Brian Bell; Michael Jenkins
- Directed by: Douglas Sharp
- Starring: Kate Fitzpatrick; Diana Perryman
- Country of origin: Australia
- Original language: English
- No. of episodes: 4

Production
- Executive producer: Alan Burke
- Producer: Brian Bell
- Cinematography: Lloyd Shiels
- Running time: 4 x 1 hour
- Production company: ABC

Original release
- Network: ABC
- Release: 22 August – 12 September 1973

Serpent in the Rainbow is an Australian mini series which first screened on the ABC in 1973. It was set in the late 19th century.

The Bulletin called it "a classical allegory about two squatting families who play out their own version of the Trojan War."

== Premise ==
In outback Australia toward the end of the 19th century, two families that down sheep stations have different views - the austere and religious Quiggs, of "Sinai" station and the more liberal Lovetts, of "Woolumbra".

Helen Quigg leaves her husband, falls for Phillip Lovett and seeks refuge with the Lovetts. The Quiggs want her back but the Lovetts refuse.

The head of the families, Pryor Lovett and Simeon Quigg, do not want violence but the younger members are harder to contain.

== Cast ==
- Kate Fitzpatrick as Helen Quigg
- John McCallum as Pryor Lovett
- Alfred Sandor as Simeon Quigg
- Shane Porteous as Phillip Lovett
- Lionel Long as Paul Lovett
- Ken Wayne
- Diana Perryman as Mrs Quigg
- Cornelia Frances
- Aileen Britton as Sarah Lovett
- Noel Brophy
- Keith Lee
- Walter Pym
- Alister Smart as Adam Quigg

== Production ==
The title refers to an Aboriginal legend of a snake that controls the destiny of humans.

== Episodes ==
1. 22 August 1973 - Helen Quigg leaves her husband, falls for Phillip Lovett and seeks refuge with the Lovetts.
2. 29 August 1973
3. 5 September 1973
4. 12 September 1973

(The above air dates are for Sydney. It aired in Melbourne starting 1 November 1973.)

== Reception ==
The Sun Herald called it "another drama beauty... all perform beautifully... don't miss this one."

The Bulletin gave it a negative review stating:

It is difficult to imagine any viewer not familiar with the stately languor of the Russian dramatists staying more than five minutes with the first episode. The whole 50 minutes were so soporific and inconclusively brooding that I stayed the distance only because a cast of gifted Australians wrought small miracles with the script... Serpent in the Rainbow is like a radio play with pictures. The pictures are superb... episode 1 was so slow-moving and uninformative as almost to be incomprehensible... the most earnestly solemn play I can remember the ABC ever producing... awkward, unreal and unnaturally sombre. The characters they have created are potentially interesting but spoilt because they are all developed in monochrome... The performances, though, were excellent.

The Age said the series "requires a little concentration but the rewards in terms of worthwhile viewing is quantum."

A sequence in the final episode where Adam Quigg broke the neck of Paul Lovett in a fist fight prompted complaints about violence. The ABC's Director of Television Drama, John Cameron, said, "It was an essential part of the play, which was four hours on the theme of violence and the inability of two men to control and avoid violence."
