= The Seagull (1959 film) =

- Based on: play The Seagull by Anton Chekhov
- Written by: Royston Morley
- Directed by: Royston Morley
- Starring: Thelma Scott
- Country of origin: Australia
- Original language: English

Production
- Running time: 75 minutes
- Production company: ABC

Original release
- Network: ABC
- Release: 22 April 1959 (Sydney, live)
- Release: 27 May 1959 (Melbourne, taped)

The Seagull is a 1959 Australian television play based on the 1896 play by Anton Chekhov. Filmed in Sydney it stars Thelma Scott and was produced and adapted by Royston Morley.

== Plot ==
In 1895 a vain and selfish actress, Irina, clashes with her son Konstantin who wants to be a writer. Her lover is Trigorin. Irinia lives at the estate of her brother Sorin.

== Cast ==
- Thelma Scott as Irina Arkadina
- William Job as Konstantin
- Roderick Walker as Trigorin
- Delia Williams as Nina, Konstantin's love
- Gordon Glenwright as Sorin, Irinia's brother
- Walter Pym as Ilya, Sorin's steward
- Anne Bullen as Polina
- Rilla Stephens
- Henry Gilbert as Yevgeny Dorn, a doctor
- Frank Taylor as Semyon, a school master
- Rilla Stephens as Masha the steward's daughter

== Production ==
The show was recorded live in Sydney. Roderick Walker was an English actor. It was the first TV appearance for him, William Job and Thelma Scott; Job and Scott recently returned home after time overseas. Job went on to appear in Hamlet for Royston Morley.

== See also ==
- List of live television plays broadcast on Australian Broadcasting Corporation (1950s)
