= Annette Andre =

Australian actress (born 1939)

- Born: Annette Christine Andreallo; 24 June 1939 (age 87); Drummoyne, NSW, Australia
- Years active: 1943 (ballet) 1954–1988, 2017, 2025 (radio, TV and film)
- Spouse: Arthur Weingarten (m. 1989)
- Children: 1

Signature
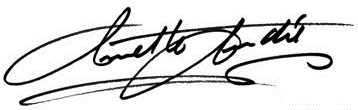

Annette Christine Andreallo (born 24 June 1939), known professionally under stage name Annette Andre, is an Australian actress best known for her work on British television throughout the 1960s and 1970s.

== Early life ==
The daughter of an upholsterer, Annette Andre was born in Drummoyne, Australia, as Annette Christine Andreallo. She was raised in Sydney and educated at Brigidine College, Sydney.

== Career ==
She began work as a ballet dancer at the age of 4 at an academy linked to the Australian Ballet. At the age of 15, she decided to quit ballet and pursue acting. Because she realised that she was not yet 16, the legal age to work in acting, Andre enrolled in a radio training school, and her first radio role was in the serial radio drama called Kid Grayson Rides the Range.

Her first role was appearing in several episodes in the religious series The House on the Corner in 1957 and she featured in her first television movie If It's a Rose the following year in 1958. Her other Australian television performances included Slaughter of St Teresa's Day.

She moved to the UK in 1963 and was cast in TV series Emerald Soup.

Her first feature film role was in This Is My Street (1964), in which her performance was described as "superb." Her other film credits include The Heroes of Telemark (1965), He Who Rides a Tiger (1965), Up Jumped a Swagman (1965), with Frank Ifield, and the Charlie Drake comedy Mister Ten Per Cent (1967). She also played Philia, a beautiful virgin concubine from the house of procurer Marcus Lycus (Phil Silvers) in the 1966 film version of the Broadway musical A Funny Thing Happened on the Way to the Forum. She played in the stage musical Vanity Fair in London's West End.

Her longest running role was as Marty Hopkirk's widow Jeannie Hopkirk in the ITC series Randall and Hopkirk (Deceased) (1969–70). She also made guest appearances in other shows such as Whiplash, The Human Jungle, The Avengers, The Saint, Adam Adamant Lives!, The Troubleshooters, The Baron, The Brothers and The Prisoner.

During the 1970s, Andre guest starred in episodes of The Persuaders!, The New Avengers and Return of the Saint. In the 1980s, she appeared in the soap opera Crossroads as well as returning to Australia to play Jennifer Brent in Taurus Rising and Camilla Wells in Prisoner (retitled Prisoner: Cell Block H in the US and UK).

During 1985 and 1986, she appeared onstage in London's West End in the mystery thriller The Business of Murder at the Mayfair Theatre.

Andre is now semi-retired from acting, and devotes much of her time to animal welfare issues. She spearheads the new BFF Support Group and, with her producer husband Arthur Weingarten, works closely with Virginia McKenna of the Zoo Check campaign. She made one of her rare appearances at the Mid-Atlantic Nostalgia Convention in Aberdeen, Maryland, US in September 2007.

== Personal life ==
She was once linked romantically with George Best, the footballer.

In the early 1960s, she turned down a proposal of marriage from Benny Hill.

She has a daughter. She chose not to reveal the identity of the father.

== Memoir ==
In 2018, Andre published her memoir Where Have I Been All My Life, with a foreword by Sir Roger Moore and an appreciation by her Randall & Hopkirk (Deceased) co-star, Kenneth Cope.

== Filmography and works ==
=== Television ===
Year	Title	Role	Type
1957	The House on the Corner		TV series
1958	If It's a Rose	Anna	TV movie
1959	Act of Violence		TV movie
1959	Wuthering Heights	Isabella	TV movie
1960	The Slaughter of St Theresa's Day	Thelma	TV movie
1960	Stormy Petrel	Ann Bligh	TV series, 4 episodes
1961	The Merchant of Venice	Jessica	TV movie
1961	Martine	Martine	TV movie
1961	Whiplash	Fiona Merrick; Cassie; Charlene	TV series, 3 episodes
1961	Consider Your Verdict	The Other Woman	TV series, episode: Queen Versus Regan
1962	Boy Round the Corner	Carrie	TV movie
1963	Our Man at St. Mark's	Jackie Hawkins	TV series, episode: Holier than Thou
1963	The Sentimental Agent	Betsy Ann	TV series, episode: Finishing School
1963	Emerald Soup	Penny Dalton	TV series, 3 episodes
1964	The Avengers	Judy	TV series, episode: Mandrake
1964	Crane	Petra	TV series, episode: Two Rings for Dinner
1964	Sergeant Cork	Mary Briggs	TV series, episode: The Case of the Two Poisons
1964	Story Parade	Rosie Sullivan	TV series, episode: The Little White God
1964	Emergency-Ward 10	Sally Graham	TV series, 3 episodes
1964	The Human Jungle	Jane	TV series, episode: Dual Control
1965	Gideon C.I.D.	Sue Young	TV series, episode: The Nightlifers
1965	The Mill on the Floss	Lucy Deane	TV series, 4 episodes
1965	Front Page Story	Ingar	TV series, episode: They Don't Grow on Trees
1966	Adam Adamant Lives!	Paula	TV series, episode: Beauty Is an Ugly Word
1964-67	The Saint	Madeline Gray; Linda Henderson; Madeline Dawson; Carmen; Annette	TV series, 5 episodes
1967	Mogul	Tammy Gervais	TV series, episode: Home and Dry
1967	The Baron	Samantha Ballard	TV series, episode: Roundabout
1967	The Dick Emery Show	Herself	TV series, episode 6.1
1967	Half Hour Story	Angie	TV series, episode: What Will You Do About Christmas?
1967	The Revenue Men	Jane Quest	TV series, episode: Conflict of Interests
1967	The Prisoner	Monique (the watchmaker's daughter	TV series, episode: It's Your Funeral
1968	The Guns of Will Sonnett	Leah Galt	TV series, episode: The Sins of the Father
1968	Detective	Anna Pryde	TV series, episode: Cork on the Water
1969-70	Randall and Hopkirk (Deceased)	Jeannie Hopkirk	TV series, 25 episodes
1971	The Persuaders!	Pekoo Rayne	ITV series, episode: Powerswitch
1972	Owen, M.D.	Mary Jane Phillips	TV series, 2-part episode:Saddler's Challenge
1972	The Brothers	Sally Wolfe	TV series, 5 episodes
1972	Man at the Top	Tricia Kennedy	TV series, episode: Living Like a Lord
1973	Nobody Is Norman Wisdom	Moria	TV series, episode 1.3
1975	The Rough with the Smooth	Irene Fellowes	TV series, episode: 1.6
1976	The New Avengers	Suzy Miller	TV series, episode: House of Cards
1978	Return of the Saint	Sandy	TV series, episode: Yesterday's Hero
1980	Company & Co.	Lucy	TV series, episode: A Little Confidence
1981	Sporting Chance		TV series, episode 6: A Perfect 10
1982	Taurus Rising	Jennifer Brant	TV series
1982-83	Cop Shop	Yvonne Holmes; Elizabeth Bakos	TV series, 15 episodes
1984	Prisoner: Cell Block H	Camilla Wells	TV series, 4 episodes
1984-1985	Crossroads	Sarah Alexander	TV Series
1988	Maigret	Judith Hollenbeck	TV movie
2025	The Prisoner of Portmeirion : Our Lives	Herself	

=== Films ===
Year	Title	Role	Type
1964	This Is My Street	Jinny	Feature film
1964	Panic Button	Drama student	Feature film
1965	He Who Rides a Tiger	Julie	Feature film
1965	The Heroes of Telemark	Girl Student	Feature film
1965	Up Jumped a Swagman	Patsy	Feature film
1966	A Funny Thing Happened on the Way to the Forum	Philia	Feature film
1967	Mister Ten Per Cent	Muriel	Feature film
2017	Nobis	Margaret	

=== Music videos ===
Year	Title	Artist
1965	You've Lost That Lovin' Feelin'	The Righteous Brothers

=== Writing ===
- Where Have I Been All My Life? (2018)
