= Stormy Petrel (TV series) =

Television series

- Ad in SMH 15 May 1960
- Genre: history
- Created by: Rex Rienits
- Directed by: Colin Dean
- Starring: Brian James
- Country of origin: Australia
- Original language: English
- No. of seasons: 1
- No. of episodes: 12

Production
- Running time: 30 minutes

Original release
- Network: ABC Television
- Release: 29 May – 31 July 1960

Related
- The Outcasts

Stormy Petrel is an early Australian television drama. A period drama, the 12-episode serial told the story of William Bligh and aired in 1960 on ABC. It was the first live TV serial from the ABC.

It was based on a script by Rex Rienits adapted from his 1948 radio serial.

Stormy Petrel was a critical and popular success and led to the ABC making a number of period drama series set in Australia's past: The Outcasts (1961), The Patriots (1962), and The Hungry Ones (1963). It also inspired ATN-7, a commercial station, to make Jonah (1962). Telerecordings (also known as Kinescope recordings) of Stormy Petrel are held by National Archives of Australia. Stormy Petrel was repeated on the ABC in 1974.

== Premise ==
The story of William Bligh's governorship of New South Wales leading up to the events of the Rum Rebellion.

== Cast ==
- Brian James as William Bligh
- Walter Sullivan as John MacArthur
- Delia Williams as Mary Bligh, Bligh's daughter
- Ric Hutton as John Putland
- Nigel Lovell as Major Johnston
- Muriel Steinbeck as Mrs Elizabeth Bligh
- Margo Lee as Elizabeth MacArthur
- Alastair Duncan as Edmund Griffin
- Richard Perry
- Charles McCallum as the Minister
- Annette Andre as Ann Bligh
- Elizabeth Waterhouse as Elizabeth Bligh
- Moray Powell as Dr Warren
- Geoffrey King as Sir Joseph Banks
- Owen Weingott as Captain Short
- Nat Levison
- Charles McCallum
- Walter Pym as Lt-Gen Keppel
- Reg Lye as George Suttor

== 1948 Radio play ==
See Stormy Petrel (radio serial)

Reinits also wrote another play covering the same events, Bligh Had a Daughter.

== TV Production ==
Early Australian TV drama production was dominated by using imported scripts but Stormy Petrel was made when the ABC was undertaking what has been described as "an Australiana" drive.

It was directed by Colin Dean who called the Rum Rebellion "virtually the colony's first revolt against what was thought to be the tyranny of government vested in the person of the Governor himself."

The suggestion to make the series came from Dean's wife who heard a broadcast of the serial on radio.

The sets were designed by Douglas Smith who was on staff at the ABC; he started working on them in December 1959. Smith says it was difficult to get sets to be authentic as while there were plenty of written descriptions there were few pictures so he had to source the latter from the army records in London.

Annette Andre played one of Bligh's daughters. A radio historian said Sullivan "gave the performance of his career" in the show.

== Episodes ==
No.	Title	Original release date	Additional air dates
1	"The Assignment"	15 May 1960 (Sydney)	29 May 1960 (Melbourne); 26 June 1960 (Brisbane)
Captain William Bligh is opposed to his daughter Mary marrying John Putland. Sir Joseph Banks offers Bligh the governorship of NSW.
2	"The Voyage Out"	22 May 1960 (Sydney)	5 June 1960 (Melbourne)
Bligh takes the boat to Australia with his daughter Mary and her husband Lt. Putland.
3	"The Arrival"	29 May 1960 (Sydney)	12 June 1960 (Melbourne)
Bligh, his daughter Mary and Lt Putland arrive in Sydney, they meet MacArthur and his wife.
4	"Enter John MacArthur"	5 June 1960 (Sydney)	19 June 1960 (Melbourne)
5	"Storm Clouds"	12 June 1960 (Sydney)	26 June 1960 (Melbourne)
6	"The Challenge"	19 June 1960 (Sydney)	3 July 1960 (Melbourne)
7	"The First Skirmish"	26 June 1960 (Sydney)	10 July 1960 (Melbourne)
8	"The Storm Gathers"	3 July 1960 (Sydney)	17 July 1960 (Melbourne)
Bligh clashes with MacArthur in a second court action
9	"The Storm Breaks"	10 July 1960 (Sydney)	24 July 1960 (Melbourne)
10	"Rebellion"	17 July 1960 (Sydney)	31 July 1960 (Melbourne)
11	"Aftermath"	24 July 1960 (Sydney)	7 August 1960 (Melbourne)
12	"The Way Back"	31 July 1960 (Sydney)	14 August 1960 (Melbourne)
Bligh returns to England to give evidence at the court martial of Major Johnston. Bligh's widowed daughter Mary becomes betrothed to Macquarie's aide, Maurice O'Connell, while Bligh's secretary, Griffin, who loves Mary, looks on. Bligh is appointed Admiral.

== Reception ==
=== Critical ===
Coming at a time when Australia produced few dramatic television series, The Age called it a "successful serial" and commented "These colorful – and factual – Australian series are a "must" for Australian television."

The Sunday Sydney Morning Herald called it "first rate entertainment."

At the end of the series' run The Age called it "Channel 2's most consistent production... stands head and shoulders above all other Australian-produced drama series."

The Woman's Weekly said Dean was to be "congratulated on a production (made difficult, I'm sure, by budget-balancing) marked by a simplicity that has been the trademark of some of the B.B.C. adaptations of famous classics. You may cock a snoot at Australian history, but "Stormy Petrel" makes Australian history come alive in absorbing TV." At the end of the series' run the Woman's Weekly called it "an outstanding production."

Filmink said "It’s not a classic or masterpiece, a work of its time, i.e. 1960 Australian television drama (for instance, I think there’s maybe one mention of Aboriginal people, and most scenes consist of a few people talking in a room). But, by those standards it’s extremely good... solid storytelling involving two three-dimensional antagonists who have a compelling conflict that leads to a surprising, yet inevitable concision... Emphasising Mary Bligh was, for me, Rienits’ masterstroke because it opens up the world of the characters, and ensures that there's a female in the story front and centre. And yes, that's due to history, but plenty of historical adaptations routinely ignore/downplay the role of women."

=== Ratings ===
According to director Colin Dean "I got the results from Audience Research – the average audience for Stormy Petrel was the same as a years run in her Majesty's Theatre including matinees. I thought to myself – that is unbelievable. That is what we have been missing. We never had audiences like that before. What a great thing we done!"

It was repeated by the ABC in 1974 before the introduction of colour television.

Filmink said it "proved Australians could be really interested in watching stories about our own history... a genuine groundbreaker: the first Australian mini-series, the first big television success from the ABC drama department, the first ABC drama to inspire a rip-off on the commercial stations (Jonah, made by ATN-7 in 1962), the first Australian TV drama to be adapted into a novel, the first Australian drama to inspire not one but two sequels. All those historical mini-series of the 1970s and 1980s that many of us grew up with – Against the Wind, For the Term of His Natural Life, Bodyline, etc – have their antecedents in Stormy Petrel."

== Sequel ==
In November 1960 it was announced that Rex Rienits and Colin Dean would reunite on a sequel that would focus on William Redfern but feature many characters from Stormy Petrel.

== Novel ==
Rienits wrote up the story as a novel, Stormy Petrel, which was published in 1963. The London Sunday Times said "narrative swings along until Bligh and MacArthur sink with all hands in a bog of litigation."
