= The Multi-Coloured Umbrella =

1958 television film directed by Raymond Menmuir

- Sun Herald 17 November 1957
- Original language: English
- Written by: Barbara Vernon
- Characters: 3 male 3 female
- Genre: comedy drama social realism
- Setting: Bondi Beach

Premiere
- Date: 5 October 1957
- Place: Melbourne Little Theatre

The Multi-Coloured Umbrella is a 1957 Australian stage play written by Barbara Vernon. It was produced professionally, was adapted for television and radio, and inspired two prequels.

== Plot ==
The play is set at a house in Bondi Beach belonging to the Donnellys, an upwardly mobile family who are bookmakers at Randwick Racecourse. Kevin and Gloria Donnelly work in the business with their songs Joe and Ben.

The younger son, Joe, has troubles with his bride, Kate, a woman from a "good" family. Joe has spent a great deal of money from the business in order to impress Kate, in part because he is failing to satisfy her sexually.

Kate's sister arrives to inform Kate there is problems involving her mother.

Joe's older brother Ben, a ladies' man, is in love with Kate and she is attracted towards him, in part because Joe does not sexually satisfy Kate. This leads to a fight between Joe and Ben.

== Background ==
SMH 6 November 1957

Vernon said she was inspired to write it when working as a radio announcer for 2NZ Inverell. She would read out ads for the local bookie which would say "do your punting under the multi-coloured umbrella". She thought about umbrellas and how they protected you from the light - just as some people can't see the light (their own motives) and have trouble clarifying their thought and action. "But don't think it throbs with psychology," said Vernon. "It's a comedy drama - a family play about ordinary people."

The role of Ben was specifically written for the actor Con Fardouly.

== Production history ==
The Age 14 December 1957

The play won second place in a 1957 contest for new plays, coming second to The Shifting Heart.

Leslie Rees, in his history of Australian theatre, praised the "provocatively stimulating and well-written scenes of human stress within a carefully observed world of people for whom horses are a profession and a living." He also thought Vernon ""caught the exact tone of talk and manners of this crudely ebullient Australian family—crude in the sense of having pitiably little inwardness or self-understanding or gift of the tactful touch, while living, at their best, according to a domestic code dictated by conscience rather than by reason."

The play was originally performed by an amateur group in the town of Inverell, in the 2NZ drama club, which Vernon co-founded.

It then had a run at the Little Theatre in Melbourne in October 1957, before being given a professional production at the Theatre Royal in Sydney starting 9 November 1957.

The Sydney Morning Herald called the play "much too slight a piece to keep the critical thunderstorms off... but sections of Saturday's first night audience certainly enjoyed its glossy magazine superficialities."

The production transferred to the Comedy Theatre in Melbourne the following month. The play had a different ending for its Sydney and Melbourne run.

The play was published by Theatregoer magazine at a time when publication of Australian plays was rare.

== The Passionate Pianist ==
Vernon later wrote a prequel about the same family, The Passionate Pianist. This screened on the ABC.

== 1958 TV adaptation ==
See The Multi-Coloured Umbrella (television play)

== Radio adaptation ==
The Age 19 May 1962

A version was also produced for Australian radio during 1958. There were versions in 1962 and 1969.

The play was also performed on BBC radio in 1966.

== See also ==
- The Passionate Pianist – 1957 television comedy one-off written by Barbara Vernon.
- List of live television plays broadcast on Australian Broadcasting Corporation (1950s)
