= The Passionate Pianist =

1957 television film

- Based on: play by Barbara Vernon
- Written by: Barbara Vernon
- Directed by: Paul O'Loughlin
- Country of origin: Australia
- Original language: English

Production
- Running time: 30 mins
- Production company: ABC

Original release
- Network: ABC
- Release: 2 October 1957

The Passionate Pianist is an Australian television film, or rather a live one-off television play, which aired in 1957 on ABC. This was part of ABC's twice monthly presentations of live plays during the late-1950s (one live play each month in Sydney and Melbourne, respectively, with most kinescoped for showing in the other city).

At the time, most one-off drama and comedy plays produced for Australian television were adaptations of overseas works, and The Passionate Pianist is notable as it represents an early example of a locally-written comedy for the medium. The Passionate Pianist aired on 2 October 1957, in Sydney, and on 1 November 1957, in Melbourne.

== Plot summary ==
Ben, the teenage son of a Sydney bookmaker prefers football to practicing piano. His mother (Marion Johns) is convinced he is a genius and enters him in an eistedford.

== Cast ==
- Mark Kelly as Ben
- Marion Johns as Ben’s Mother
- Edward Howell
- Ivor Bromley
- Bruce A. Wishart

== Play version ==
The Passionate Pianist was produced as a one act play. Barbara Vernon was a radio announcer in Inverell and wrote the play for Con Fardouly, a Greek who ran a cafe in Inverell.

It was first performed at the Inverell Town Hall, on 22 November 1957. The cast included Lee Jones, Nell Stewart, Frank Sloman, Rob Jeffs, and Con Fardouly.

It is part of the trilogy The Growing Year, which also includes Vernon's unpublished plays The Bishop and the Boxer and First Love.

== Production ==
Rehearsals began in September 1957.

It is not known if the kinescope recording of the program still exists.

== Radio adaptation ==
The play was also adapted for radio.

== Follow up ==
Barbara Vernon is also known for writing the play The Multi-Coloured Umbrella, which saw a television version in 1958. It was focused on the same family of Sydney book makers.

== See also ==
- Tomorrow's Child - One-off play on ABC, also during 1957
- Ending It - One-off play on ABC, also during 1957
- Take That - First Australian sitcom, 1957-1959
- Bodgie - One-off play on ABC, aired in 1959
- Blue Murder - One-off play on ABC, aired in 1959
- List of live television plays broadcast on Australian Broadcasting Corporation (1950s)
