= Whiplash (TV series) =

British/Australian television series

- Genre: Australian Western
- Created by: Michael Noonan; Michael Plant
- Written by: Gene Roddenberry; Harry Julian Fink
- Starring: Peter Graves; Anthony Wickert
- Theme music composer: Edwin Astley
- Opening theme: "Whiplash" sung by Frank Ifield
- Composers: Edwin Astley; Albert Elms
- Countries of origin: United Kingdom; Australia
- Original language: English
- No. of series: 1
- No. of episodes: 34 (list of episodes)

Production
- Executive producers: Ralph SmartResigned; Leslie Harris
- Producers: Maurice Geraghty; Ben Fox
- Production location: Australia: Artransa Park Studios
- Running time: 25 min.
- Production companies: Seven Network; ATV; Incorporated Television Company

Original release
- Network: Seven Network (Australia); ITV (UK)
- Release: 10 September 1960 – 10 June 1961

Whiplash is a British/Australian television series in the Australian Western genre, produced by the Seven Network, ATV, and ITC Entertainment, and starring Peter Graves. Filmed in 1959-60, the series was first broadcast in the United Kingdom in September 1960, and in Australia in February 1961.

== Overview ==
Set during the Australian gold rushes of the 1850s, the series was inspired by the life of Freeman Cobb, founder of the iconic Australian stagecoach line, Cobb and Co. However, the characters and events in the series bore no resemblance to the real Freeman Cobb or his company. Freeman Cobb did not carry a pistol or use a stockwhip to settle disputes.

The series was created by Michael Noonan and Michael Plant, and produced by Maurice Geraghty and Ben Fox at the Artransa Studios in Sydney, which were owned by ATV. Post-production was completed in the United Kingdom. Michael Plant and Ralph Peterson were story editors.

== Cast and characters ==
In his autobiography, associate producer and director of many episodes John Meredyth Lucas commented on the difficulty faced in casting the series. He wrote that actors with radio experience were generally used, because of concerns with the broad Australian accents of some performers. Long-time radio producer Harry Dearth was brought on as a casting consultant to identify suitable cast members.

On his return to the United States in October 1960, Graves also commented on the difficulty in finding actors. "Those we got were very good, but there just wasn't enough of them," he said.

=== Main cast ===
- Peter Graves as Christopher Cobb
- Anthony Wickert as Dan Ledward

Leading player, Peter Graves, was best known at the time for the TV Western Fury.

=== Guests ===
- Annette Andre as Fiona Merrick / Cassie / Charlene (3 episodes)
- Ben Gabriel as Ted Cammidge (1 episode)
- Brenda Senders as Mrs Parker (1 episode)
- Chips Rafferty as Patrick Flegg / Sorrel (2 episodes)
- Chuck Faulkner as O'Hara / Tiny Denvers
- Colin Croft as Paddy Cowan
- Delia Williams as Ella Clauson / Helen Tanner (2 episodes)
- George Wallace Jnr
- Gordon Glenwright as Carthy / Petey Hibberd (2 episodes)
- Guy Doleman as Sundowner / Raike Dartner / Norris
- Henry Murdoch as Billy Jo (4 episodes)
- Janette Craig Catherine Lachlan / Joan Geddes / Nina Alvarez (3 episodes)
- Jennifer Jayne as Genevieve Rochelle (1 episode)
- Joe McCormick as Arnold Lofton / Lucien Zumwalt / Matt Denvers (3 episodes)
- John Fegan as Capart / Peter Garth (2 episodes)
- Leonard Teale as Harry Wallace / Norton (2 episodes)
- Lionel Long as Dyson / Jim Witton (2 episodes)
- Margo Lee as Anna Eddington / Rosie London / Terri McKenna
- Max Osbiston as Gillespie / Garth Blake (2 episodes)
- Neva Carr Glyn as Tamros (1 episode)
- Nigel Lovell as Edwin Regnor / Jose / Wilfred Swan (3 episodes)
- Owen Weingott as Billy Fry / Smithy (2 episodes)
- Peter Aanensen as Sam Green (1 episode)
- Reg Lye as Barrow / Bradley Bradley / Police Sergeant (3 episodes)
- Reg Gorman as Gang member (1 episode)
- Richard Meikle as Pecos Denvers (1 episode)
- Robert Tudawali as Kuanspa / Kuraba / Mundaru / Kogarah / Dalgowlie / Native Boy / Roonga (7 episodes)
- Stewart Ginn as Peebles (1 episode)
- Stuart Wagstaff as Jimmy Quicksilver / Lieutenant Hoffman (3 episodes)
- Terry McDermott as Jack Sheridan / Slyter / Tom
- Tom Farley as Bunyip Joe / Dr. Inigo Table / Farmer (3 episodes)
- Walter Pym as Oscar Wenders / Mr Poole (3 episodes)

== Episode list ==
The original air date is for ATV London. ITV regions varied date and order.

Production number refers to the order in the Network DVD booklet.

No.	Title	Directed by	Written by	Original release date	Prod. code
1	"Episode in Bathurst"	Peter Maxwell	Gene Roddenberry	10 September 1960	102
Three brothers set up roadblocks in the town of Bathurst demanding payment from passing traffic. With a big contract at stake Cobb must act quickly.
2	"Convict Town"	Peter Maxwell	Dwight Newton	17 September 1960	101
Big Tom Ledward rules his settlement with a rod of iron, much to the distaste of his son, Dan Ledward, and is determined to stop Cobb opening a new stage route.
3	"Rider on the Hill"	John Meredyth Lucas	Harry Julian Fink	24 September 1960	104
A Cobb & Co. coach is wrecked by two bushrangers. A passenger is killed in the crash, and Cobb kills the bushrangers in self-defence. He later receives an Aboriginal death-stick, marking him to die at the next full moon. Defying the warning, Cobb takes a coach into Aboriginal territory, knowing that one of his passengers is his would-be killer.
4	"Barbed Wire"	Peter Maxwell	Harry Julian Fink	30 September 1960	108
A vicious landowner has a young farmer flogged for attempting to fence in his land with barbed wire. Cobb and Ledward find the injured man, and Cobb goes after the landowner. Stars Robert Tudawali
5	"Sarong"	John Meredyth Lucas	Gene Roddenberry	8 October 1960	103
Cobb heads north towards Brisbane to investigate the disappearance of several female indentured servants who have vanished while travelling on Cobb & Co. coaches. He finds that the women were kidnapped and taken to a secluded inlet, where they are forced to dive for pearls.
6	"Dutchman's Reef"	Peter Maxwell	Gene Roddenberry	15 October 1960	106
A wealthy matriarch asks Cobb to search for her missing son rumoured to be living with an Aboriginal tribe, and stumbles across a legendary rich gold deposit, known as 'Dutchman's Reef'. Stars Leonard Teale
7	"The Other Side of Swan"	Peter Maxwell	Michael Plant	22 October 1960	107
While in Melbourne to open a branch office, Cobb is asked to do a personal favour for Sir John Eddington, the Governor of New South Wales - to locate his brother, who fled England after being charged with murder.
8	"The Actress"	Peter Maxwell	Gene Roddenberry	29 October 1960	111
Miners will no longer send their gold with Cobb & Co. - unless Cobb can prevent bushranger Mike Upton's raids on the coaches. During the trip, Upton waylays Cobb's coach and kidnaps a female passenger. Cobb trails Upton to his lair and rescues the girl. When their trail crosses that of the irate miners, who are intent on lynching Upton, the aspiring actress must give the performance of her career to save his life. Stars Jennifer Jayne
9	"Love Story in Gold"	John Meredyth Lucas	James Clavell	5 November 1960	105
Cobb is paid handsomely to undertakes the transport of brandy, a trousseau and two coffins, into the heart of New South Wales. At the agreed meeting place, Cobb is overpowered and taken to meet the female leader of a group of escaped convicts. She tells Cobb that he is to marry her daughter and he will be given more gold than he can imagine. If he refuses, he will fill one of the coffins. Stars Neva Carr Glyn
10	"The Bone that Whispered"	John Meredyth Lucas	Michael Plant	3 December 1960	109
Dan has vanished and when a small girl is left motherless, Cobb sets out to track down her father, a man charged with murder who has fled the law swearing his innocence and now lives with an Aboriginal tribe. Stars Nigel Lovell, Robert Tudawali
11	"The Secret of Screaming Hills"	Peter Maxwell	Michael Plant	10 December 1960	110
Cobb finds a dying man in the bush, and undertakes to deliver a map to the man's wife. With the help of an Aboriginal, Cobb solves the mystery of the 'frog fella' and a missing treasure.
12	"Act of Courage"	Ben Fox	Gerry Day	17 December 1960	115
On his way to testify at the trial of a bushranger charged with killing one of his stagecoach drivers, Cobb arrives at drought-stricken Cross Creek Way Station with two passengers, a married couple. He is met by a gang who plan to keep him prisoner until after the bushranger's trial. Stars Terry McDermott, Guy Doleman, Margo Lee
13	"The Twisted Road"	Peter Maxwell	Michael Plant	7 January 1961	118
Returning to Brisbane from an outback run, Cobb's coach is commandeered to transport a prisoner, Ted Cammidge, who is to stand trial for murder, and is accompanied by his employer, Dr. Table, who plans to vouch for his innocence at the trial. Stars Rachael Lloyd, Ben Gabriel, Tom Farley.
14	"Divide and Conquer"	Peter Maxwell	David Evans	14 January 1961	120
A murderous gang abduct Cobb and a Government minister looking for a mountain pass to open up the fertile land beyond. Stars Colin Croft, Owen Weingott
15	"The Remittance Man"	John Meredyth Lucas	Wells Root and Ron Bishop	21 January 1961	121
Jimmy Quicksilver, a 'gentleman' bushranger who has been robbing coaches, asks Cobb to conceal knowledge of his activities from two members of his aristocratic family, who have come to Australia to take Quicksilver's son to England to be educated. Stars Stuart Wagstaff
16	"Day of the Hunter"	Peter Maxwell	Michael Plant	28 January 1961	117
A squatter's farm where Cobb wants to build a way station is burned down by a land-hungry neighbour who trades on people's fears by terrorising their families. Cobb undertakes a hazardous crossing of an Aboriginal burial ground to assist. Stars Chips Rafferty
17	"The Solid Gold Brigade"	Maury Geraghty	Michael Plant	4 February 1961	119
Cobb is transporting miner's gold from Fury Creek to Sydney, but en route a bushranger shoots him and leaves him for dead. The bushranger takes Cobb's coach and clothes to impersonate him and get away with the gold. Stars John Gray
18	"Stage for Two"	Peter Maxwell	Terry Maples	11 February 1961	112
Cobb becomes the reluctant ally of an escaping bank robber who is sought not only by the police, but also by the outlaw gang he has cheated. Stars Leonard Teale
19	"Canoomba Incident"	Peter Maxwell	Richard Grey and Ralph Peterson	18 February 1961	122
Upon arrival in Canoomba, Cobb and Dan Ledward find the men are away digging gold and the women are running the town. Dan Ledward finds romance in the town before being assigned the perilous task of carrying a fortune in gold from the diggings to Canoomba. Stars Janette Craig, Brenda Senders
20	"The Rushing Sands"	Peter Maxwell	Michael Plant	25 February 1961	123
In his Duranga office, Cobb finds Peter Hibberd, a one time star driver for the Cobb & Co stage line and now a mere husk of a man expecting death. Hibberd dedicates his last days to tracking down a bushranger who is believed to have murdered his son. Stars Gordon Glenwright
21	"The Adelaide Arabs"	Peter Maxwell	Ralph Peterson	4 March 1961	127
Cobb is in competition to buy three magnificent Arabian horses, and the contest soon becomes a fight to the death after he is robbed by three masked men who intend to buy the horses. Stars Chips Rafferty, Stuart Wagstaff
22	"The Hunters"	John Meredyth Lucas	Morris L West	11 March 1961	113
A white cattleman, Dillon, inadvertently interrupts the ritual killing of a bull by a tribe of Aboriginals, and must himself be killed to complete the cycle of events. Seriously wounded Dillon manages to escape. When Dillon's riderless horse returns to the homestead Cobb sets out on a desperate race against time. Stars Robert Tudawali
23	"The Legacy"	John Meredyth Lucas	Bill Templeton	18 March 1961	124
Anxious to obtain good grazing land for his horses, Cobb approaches the heir to a dilapidated estate to enquire about a grazing lease on the property. Cobb's request falls on unresponsive ears and a chain of events behind an Aboriginal boys stolen legacy.
24	"Fire Rock"	John Meredyth Lucas	Michael Plant	25 March 1961	126
A trusted Cobb & Co agent disappears in the 'Taroomba' (burning land), a sacred Aboriginal burial ground which is rich in opal. His alluring wife, persuades Cobb to lead a search party. Stars Robert Tudawali, Delia Williams
25	"Stage Freight"	Peter Maxwell	Ralph Peterson	8 April 1961	125
Cobb has a full load of passengers on the return journey from Mowamba, and it seems certain that among them are a man and a woman who have committed a brutal murder.
26	"The Wreckers"	John Meredyth Lucas	Daphne Field	15 April 1961	114
A group of bushrangers capture a Cobb & Co. coach, and use it in a series of raids and robberies implicating Cobb. To protect his company's reputation, Cobb tracks down the bushrangers. Stars Guy Doleman, Robert Tudawali
27	"Portrait in Gunpowder"	John Meredyth Lucas	Michael Plant	22 April 1961	134
Cobb accepts a commission to transport a renowned artist newly arrived from France to an undisclosed destination. He again crosses the path of Jimmy Quicksilver, a 'gentleman bushranger' whose dishonesty is equalled only by his good manners and sense of humour. Stars Stuart Wagstaff
28	"Ribbons and Wheels"	Peter Maxwell	Ralph Peterson	29 April 1961	131
The sleepy calm of outback Ginini is shattered when Cobb accepts a challenge to race a Western Co. stagecoach over the usual route to Brindabella to win the exclusive franchise for the route.
29	"Flood Tide"	Ben Fox	Michael Plant	6 May 1961	129
Their route cut off by a flood Cobb and his sole passenger, Sarah Bartley, spend the night in a deserted house. During the night a violent storm strikes, and all is not as it seems when a mysterious stranger arrives to seek shelter.
30	"Storm River"	John Meredyth Lucas	Michael Plant	13 May 1961	130
During a violent storm with a lame horse, Cobb is felled by an unseen foe. He recovers consciousness in an outback cabin, minus his money-belt. The cabin's other occupant is a girl who wants to travel to Sydney. She asks Cobb to take her with him, but when they set off they meet with deadly opposition. Stars Annette Andre
31	"Dilemma in Wool"	Peter Maxwell	Ralph Peterson	20 May 1961	133
Cobb becomes involved in the strange story of a beautiful Spanish woman, and a disapproving family. The beginning of Australia's wool growing industry. Stars Lionel Long, Nigel Lovell
32	"Magic Wire"	Peter Maxwell	Ralph Peterson	27 May 1961	132
Aboriginal attacks imperil the laying of an overhead telegraph line. Cobb, contracted to freight supplies from the coast to a telegraph construction camp, discovers that the attacks are being instigated by a white man. Stars Terry McDermott, Robert Tudawali
33	"The Haunted Valley"	John Meredyth Lucas	Gerry Day	3 June 1961	116
Cattlemen at Wallaby Junction lose stock in mysterious thefts which convince Cobb that there must be a secret pass through the surrounding mountains. He sets out to find the trail and catch the thief.
34	"Dark Runs the Sea"	John Meredyth Lucas	Oscar Maillard and Michael Plant	10 June 1961	128
Attractive, adventurous, niece of the local magistrate, is kidnapped in the outback. Cobb is mystified when he discovers that she is apparently a willing victim, and her uncle is reluctant to press on with the search for her. Stars Annette Andre, Guy Doleman, Reg Lye

== Background and production ==
=== Development ===
Michael Noonan had created and written a British TV series shot in Australia called The Flying Doctor. Whiplash was a similar international production. The show was mostly financed by Lew Grade's ITC productions, but was aimed at the international market, leading to many Americans being in key creative roles. Post production was done in the UK.

Co-producing partners included Australia's Artransa Park Studios and Britain's ATV.

=== Filming ===
Filming started in October 1959 at Artransa Park Studios in Frenchs Forest, a Sydney suburb, with location work at Scone, New South Wales and elsewhere.

Graves told the Sydney Morning Herald that "Nearly all the American Westerns are shot within 30 miles of Hollywood and a lot of that scenery is becoming mighty familiar to TV viewers. Now this scenery here is refreshing — something entirely new to folks overseas. We're trying to keep right away from that word 'Western' by labelling the series a romantic adventure."

In his memoirs, Lucas commented on the difficulties faced because of the sometimes inexperienced Australian crew. Production was also initially difficult because of the competing expectations of production partners from three different countries. The production team was restructured from episode six onwards, after which Ben Fox was appointed producer with Leslie Harris as executive producer.

Filming re-commenced on 4 March 1960. The budget of the series was a reported £650,000.

In May 1960, it was reported the unit of 22 actors and crew had left Sydney for Alice Springs to film sequences over ten days, including scenes at Ayers Rock, the MacDonnell Ranges and the Ormiston Gorge. By that stage, ten episodes had been shot and the series sold to ATN Channel 7. Fox announced that both American and British television groups were "likely to be very interested in buying the series".

During production, actor-director Joe McCormick was accidentally shot by a blank shotgun shell while filming a scene with Annette Andre. After spending two weeks in hospital, he made a full recovery.

=== Music ===
Theme Music: Words and Music by Edwin Astley, sung by Frank Ifield.

=== Incidental music ===
Edwin Astley, Albert Elms

== Release ==
=== Broadcast ===
In 1961, it became one of the original twelve programs aired by the new CTV network in Canada, and the only one produced in Australia.

=== Home media ===
On 7 December 2009, Network released a Region 2 five-DVD set.

On 18 September 2012, Timeless Media Group released Whiplash - The Complete Series on DVD in Region 1. The 4-disc set featured all 34 episodes of the series.

DVD name	Format	Ep#	Discs	Region 1 (USA)	Region 2 (UK)	Region 4 (Australia)	Special features	Distributors
Whiplash: The Complete Series	DVD	34	5		7 December 2009		Extensive Image Galleries PDF material	
Whiplash - The Complete Series	DVD	34	4	18 September 2012			None	Timeless Media Group
Whiplash - The Complete Series	DVD	34	4			19 June 2024	Image Gallery	Via Vision Entertainment

== Notes ==
- "The Australian Film and Television Companion" — compiled by Tony Harrison — Simon & Schuster Australia, 1994
- Atkinson, Stephen (2007). "A Rumble in the Great Australian Silence: whiplash and the Telling of the Australian Frontier". In Liz, Liz; Dolin, Tim (eds.). Australian Television History. ACH: The Journal of the History of Culture in Australia. Australian Public Intellectual Network. pp. 37–57.
- Vagg, Stephen (11 December 2021). "Forgotten Australian TV Series: Whiplash". FilmInk.
