= Union Arts Center =

Non-profit theatre organization in Seattle

- Formation: 1965
- Type: Theatre group
- Website: www.unionartscenter.org
Union Arts Center
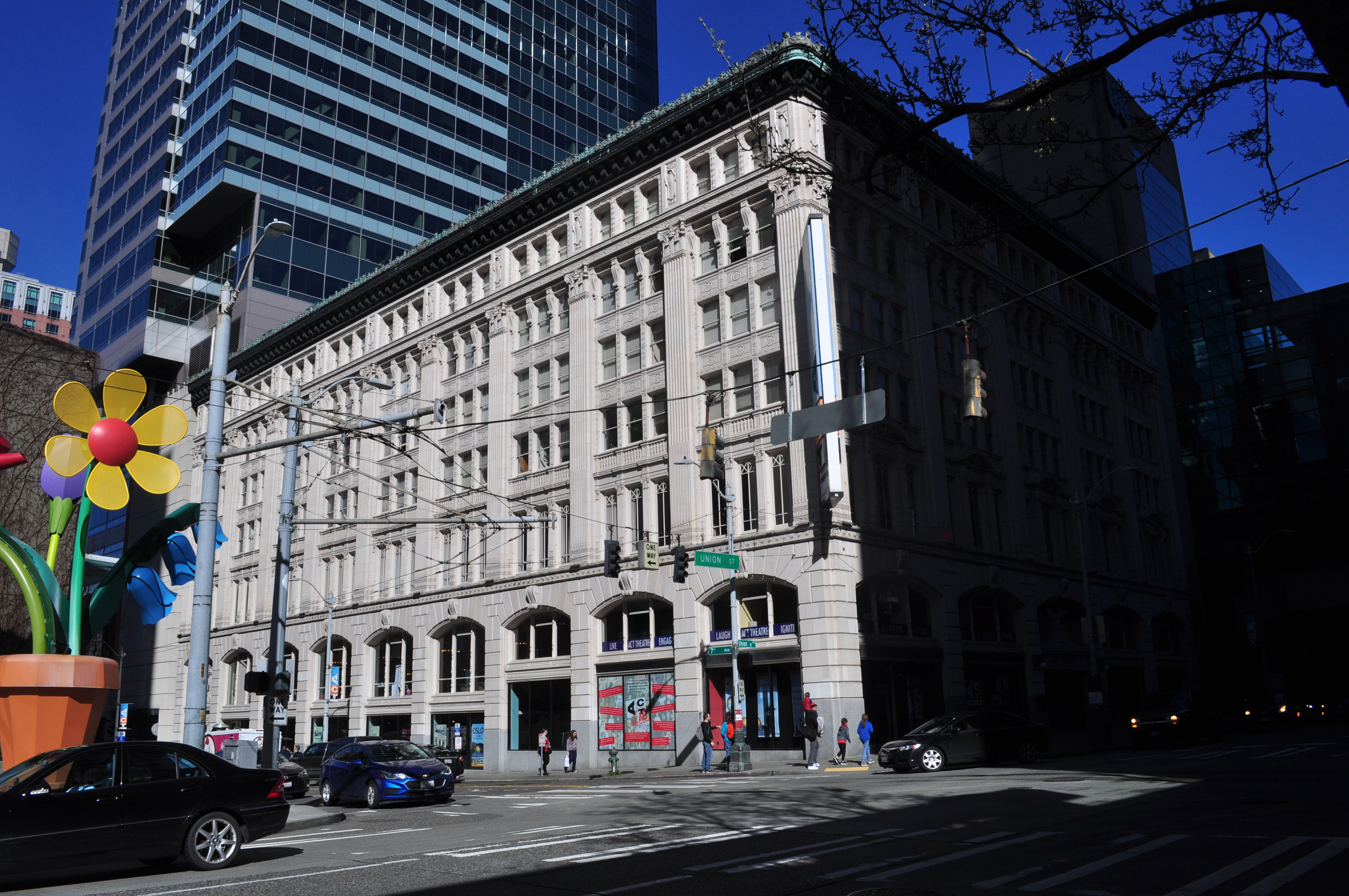
- Interactive map of Union Arts Center
- Address: 700 Union Street
- Location: Seattle
- Coordinates: 47.611°N 122.332°W
- Capacity: 409 (The Falls Theatre); 435 (The Allen Theatre); 60 (The Lalie Theatre)

Union Arts Center (previously A Contemporary Theatre (ACT) and ACT Contemporary Theatre) is a regional, non-profit theatre organization in Seattle, in the US state of Washington. Gregory A. Falls (1922–1997) founded ACT in 1965 and served as its first Artistic director; at the time ACT was founded he was also head of the Drama Department at the University of Washington. Falls was identified with the theatrical avant garde of the time, and founded ACT because he saw the Seattle Repertory Theatre as too specifically devoted to classics. In 2025, ACT Contemporary Theatre merged with the Seattle Shakespeare Company to form the Union Arts Center.

== Facility ==
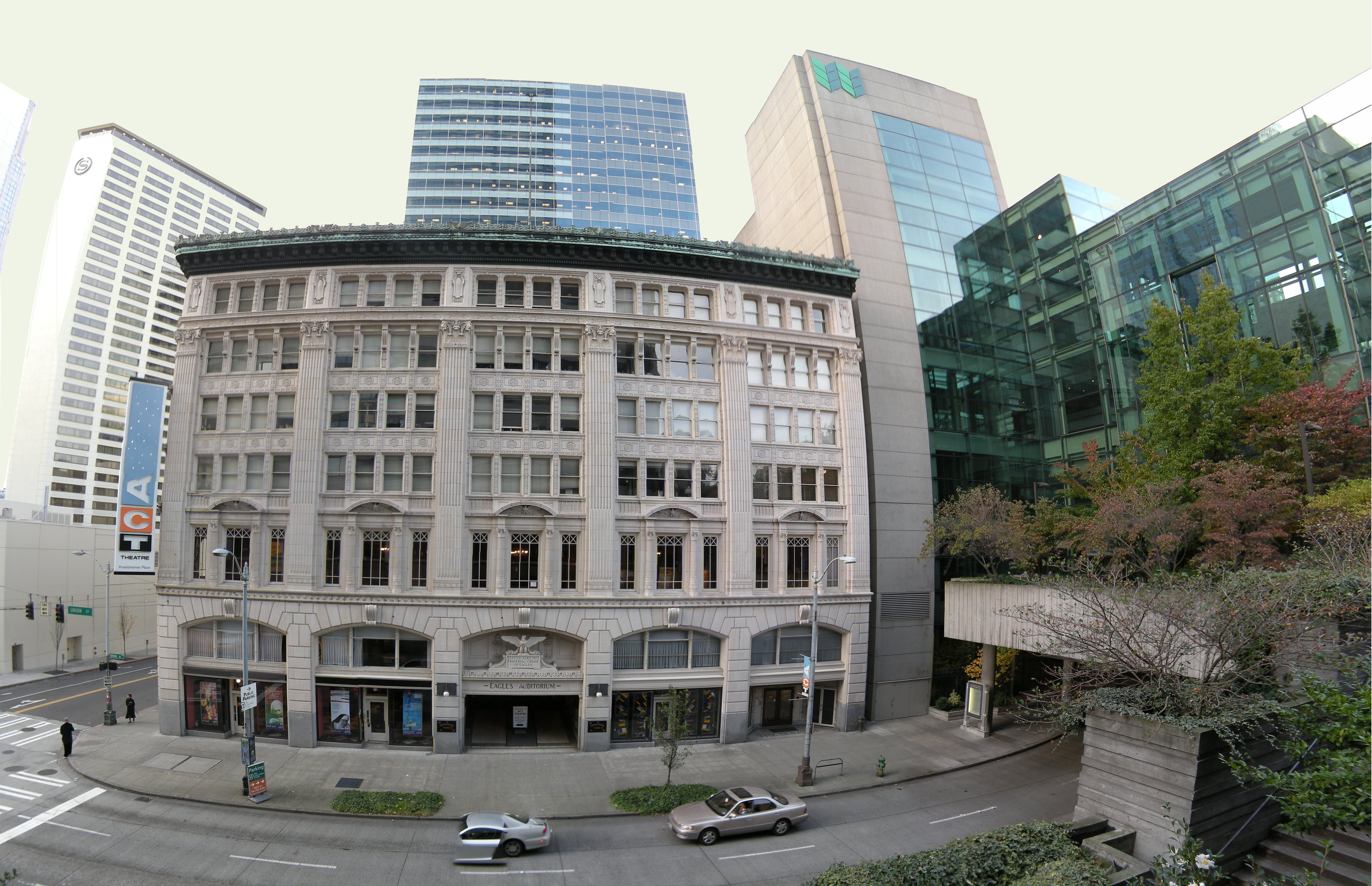
ACT Contemporary Theatre's home, Kreielsheimer Place, the historic Eagles Auditorium Building; at right is the Washington State Convention and Trade Center

The Union Arts Center is located in Kreielsheimer Place, at 700 Union Street in Downtown Seattle. The building, which also includes the 44 unit, moderate-income Eagles Apartments, is the historic Eagles Auditorium Building. Previously part of the Washington State Convention and Trade Center (to which it is connected via internal tunnel), the building was remodeled into theater spaces and apartments and renamed in honor of a major gift from the Kreielsheimer Foundation. There are two mainstage theater spaces, each with a capacity of about 390 seats. The Gregory A. Falls Theatre, located below street level, has a rectangular thrust stage. Above ground, the former Eagles Auditorium hall (now known as the Allen Theatre) is an arena or "in-the-round" venue.

Complying with landmark ordinances, the Allen Theatre retains the Eagles Auditorium's gilded balcony, ornate ceiling, and crystal chandeliers, though some of this is obscured by the HVAC and lighting systems. The decision to convert this famous lecture hall and performance venue from a proscenium stage to theater-in-the-round was, according to Misha Berson, "the most controversial aspect of the renovation". The proscenium stage from which Martin Luther King Jr. once spoke, and on which the Grateful Dead performed, "is now just a painted relic in the background."

The facility also includes the 4,539-square-foot (421.7 m^{2}) Bullitt Cabaret and several other smaller spaces.

== History ==
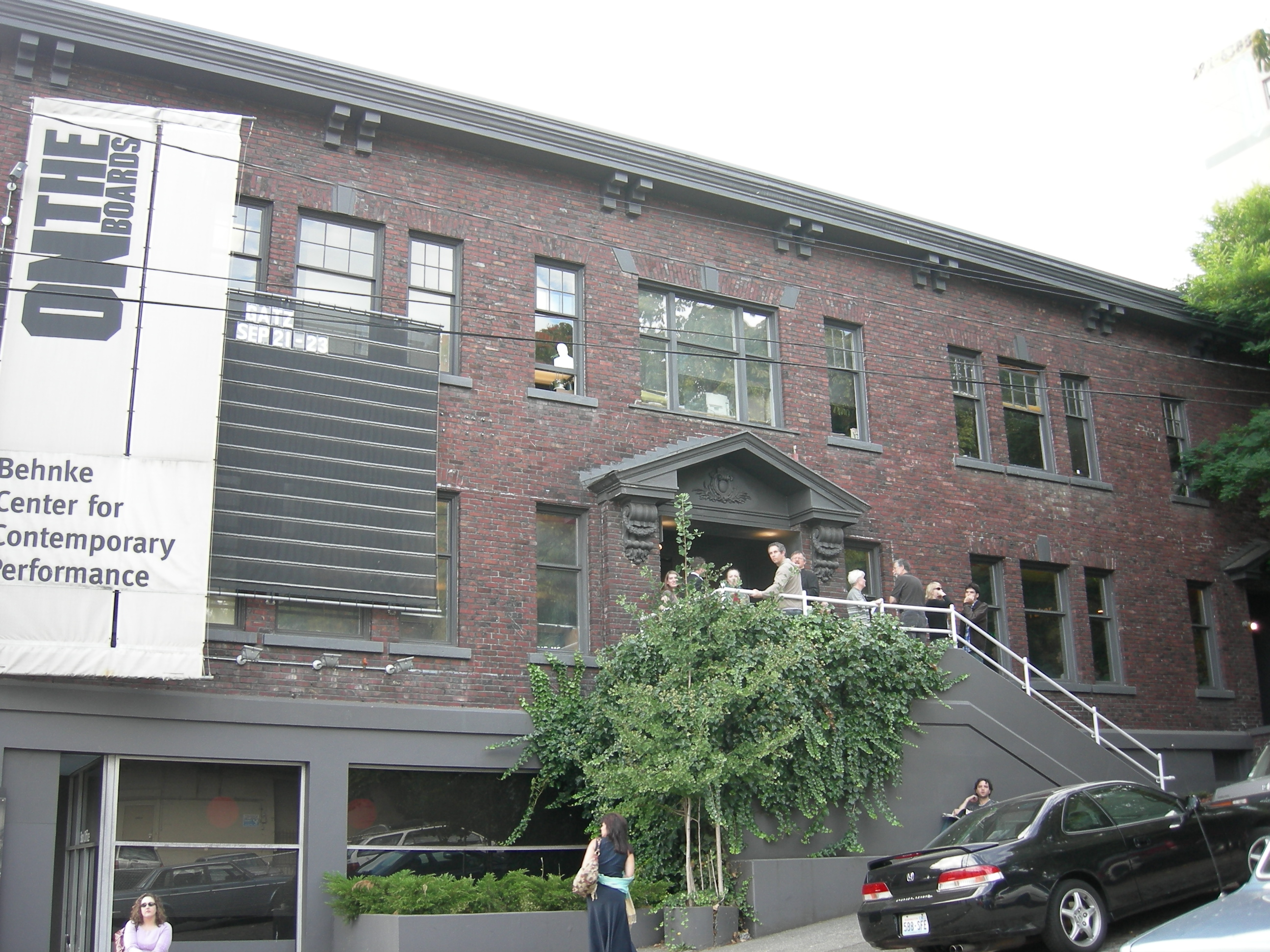
Queen Anne Hall (2007), now home to On the Boards.

ACT was founded by Gregory A. Falls in 1965, providing Seattle with "a serious alternative to summer stock theater." They staged their first performance July 9, 1965. ACT was originally in a 454-seat thrust-stage theater in Queen Anne Hall, now home to On the Boards. Falls remained as artistic director until 1988, when he was succeeded by Jeff Steitzer, then in 1995 by Peggy Shannon.

After a lengthy and difficult search for a larger space, ACT moved into its new Kreielsheimer Place facility in 1996, and presented its first play there on September 1 of that year. However, Shannon's productions at the new facility were not well received by the critics or the public. Shannon resigned in 1997, leaving ACT in debt for the first time in its history, and with subscriptions having fallen from 11,400 in 1996 to 9,000 in 1997. Her successor, Gordon Edelstein, revived the company's critical and popular reputation, bringing such noted performers as actresses Julie Harris and Jane Alexander and singer songwriter Randy Newman, as well as experimental director Joanne Akalaitis and composer Philip Glass. Several ACT premieres went on to successful runs in New York. However, costs rose accordingly, and ACT's debts mounted. In October 2002, ACT made an offer to Robert Egan, producing director at the Mark Taper Forum in Los Angeles, to become their new artistic director, but by the time the 2003 season was approaching, ACT had a US$1.7 million debt and was in no position to honor their offer. They were in serious danger of folding. Subscriptions dropped to 7,500.

Donations (including $500,000 Boeing chairman Phil Condit), some scaling back, and a successful 2003 season under artistic director Kurt Beattie saved the day, sparing ACT the fate visited upon Seattle's comparably prominent Empty Space Theatre in the same period. By the 2006 season, ACT was back to venturesome programming, including Martin McDonagh's black comedy The Pillowman and local writer Elizabeth Heffron's Mitzi's Abortion.

John Langs became the artistic director, replacing Kurt Beattie, December 2015. In 2018, Yussef El Guindi became a Core Company playwright member.

In 2025, ACT Theatre signed a merger agreement with Seattle Shakespeare Company. Their inaugural merged production of Twelfth Night premiered in the Falls Theatre on June 12, 2025, with the merger officially taking effect on July 1, 2025.

== Stature ==
Over more than four decades, the Union Arts Center has established itself as one of Seattle's leading theaters. Along with the Cornish Playhouse and Seattle Repertory Theatre ("The Rep"), it is one of the city's three largest playhouses. ACT's Mainstage has presented many world, American, and West Coast premieres. Numerous productions have gone on to New York City.

Union Arts Center is a member of the League of Resident Theatres (LORT). It is also a member of Theatre Puget Sound and is a constituent of Theatre Communications Group. The Union Arts Center is also a member of the Downtown Seattle Association, Seattle's Convention and Visitors Bureau and Greater Seattle Chamber of Commerce.

== Mainstage production history ==
2025 Season	Playwright	Notes
POTUS: Or, Behind Every Great Dumbass Are Seven Women Trying to Keep Him Alive	Selina Fillinger	
Mrs. Loman is Leaving	Katie Forgette	
The Last Five Years	Jason Robert Brown	Co-Production with The 5th Avenue Theatre
Golden	Andrew Lee Creech	
Twelfth Night	William Shakespeare	Co-Production with Seattle Shakespeare Company, directed by Annie Lareau
2024 Season	Playwright	Notes
Cambodian Rock Band	Lauren Yee, Dengue Fever	Co-production with 5th Avenue Theatre, Alley Theatre, Arena Stage, and Berkeley Repertory Theatre
A Case for the Existence of God	Samuel D. Hunter	
STEW	Zora Howard	
The Lehman Trilogy	Stefano Massini	Adaptation by Ben Power
2023 Season	Playwright	Notes
Choir Boy	Tarrell Alvin McCraney	Co-production with Denver Center for the Performing Arts and 5th Avenue Theatre
History of Theatre: About, By, For, and Near	Reginald André Jackson	World Premiere
Every Brilliant Thing	Duncan Macmillian, Jonny Donahoe	
Wolf Play	Hansol Jung	
2022 Season	Playwright	Notes
Hotter Than Egypt	Yussef El Guindi	World Premiere
The Thin Place	Lucas Hnath	
Sweat	Lynn Nottage	
2020 Season	Playwright	Notes
Sweat	Lynn Nottage	Production cancelled due to the COVID-19 pandemic
The Effect	Lucy Prebble	Production cancelled due to the COVID-19 pandemic
Choir Boy	Tarrell Alvin McCraney	Co-production with Denver Center for the Performing Arts. Production cancelled due to the COVID-19 pandemic
The Laugh Track	Wendy MacLeod	World Premiere. Production cancelled due to the COVID-19 pandemic
Witch	Jen Silverman	Production cancelled due to the COVID-19 pandemic
2019 Season	Playwright	Notes
Romeo + Juliet	William Shakespeare	
Urinetown	Mark Hollmann, Greg Kotis	Co-production with 5th Avenue Theatre
Pass Over	Antoinette Nwandu	
The Year of Magical Thinking	Joan Didion	
People of the Book	Yussef El Guindi	World Premiere
Dracula	Steven Dietz adapted from Bram Stoker	New Adaptation
2018 Season	Playwright	Notes
Ride the Cyclone	Brooke Maxwell, Jacob Richmond	Co-production with 5th Avenue Theatre
The Wolves	Sarah DeLappe	
Until the Flood	Dael Orlandersmith	
Lauren Weedman Doesn't Live Here Anymore	Lauren Weedman	World Premiere
Skylight	David Hare	
Oslo	J. T. Rogers	
2017 Season	Playwright	Notes
Tribes (play)	Nina Raine	
Murder for Two	Kellen Blair, Joe Kinosian	Co-production with 5th Avenue Theatre
The Legend of Georgia McBride	Matthew Lopez	
Alex & Aris	Moby Pomerance	
King of the Yees	Lauren Yee	
The Crucible	Arthur Miller	
2016 Season	Playwright	Notes
Assassins	Stephen Sondheim, John Weidman	
Stupid Fucking Bird	Aaron Posner	
The Mystery of Love and Sex	Bathsheba Doran	
Daisy	Sean Devine	
The Royale	Marco Ramirez	
Dangerous Liaisons	Christopher Hampton	
2015 Season	Playwright	Notes
Jacques Brel is Alive and Well and Living in Paris	Eric Blau, Jacques Brel, Mort Shuman	
Cat on a Hot Tin Roof	Tennessee Williams	
Threesome	Yussef El Guindi	
Hold These Truths	Jeanna Sakata	
Bloomsday	Steven Dietz	
Mr. Burns, a post-electric play	Anne Washburn, Michael Friedman (score)	
2014 Season	Playwright	Notes
Little Shop of Horrors	Howard Ashman, Roger Corman, Charles B. Griffith, Alan Menken	
Bethany	Laura Marks	
The Price	Arthur Miller	
An Evening of One Acts	Woody Allen, Steve Martin, Sam Shepard	
The Invisible Hand	Ayad Akhtar	
Vanya and Sonia and Masha and Spike	Christopher Durang	
2013 Season	Playwright	Notes
Assisted Living	Katie Forgette	
Grey Gardens	Scott Frankel, Michael Korie, Doug Wright	
Other Desert Cities	Jon Robin Baitz	
Rapture, Blister, Burn	Gina Gionfriddo	
Middletown	Will Eno	
Sugar Daddies	Alan Ayckbourn	
Season 2012	Playwright	Notes
First Date	Michael Weiner, Austin Winsberg, Alan Zachary	
The Pitmen Painters	Lee Hall	
One Slight Hitch	Lewis Black	
The Pinter Festival	Harold Pinter	
Uncle Ho to Uncle Sam	Robert Egan, Trieu Tran	
Ramayana	Yussef El Guindi, Stephanie Timm	
2011 Season	Playwright	Notes
Vanities: A New Musical	Jack Heifner	
The Prisoner of Second Avenue	Neil Simon	
Pilgrims in the New World	Yussef El Guindi	
In the Next Room (or the Vibrator Play)	Sarah Ruhl	
Mary Stewart	Peter Oswald	
Double Indemnity	David Pichette, R. Hamilton Wright, James M. Cain	
2010 Season	Playwright	Notes
The Trip to Bountiful	Horton Foote	
The Female of the Species	Joanna Murray-Smith	
Yankee Tavern	Steven Dietz	
The Lady With All the Answers	David Rambo	
The Lieutenant of Inishmore	Martin McDonagh	
2009 Season	Playwright	Notes
Dr. Jekyll and Mr. Hyde	Robert Louis Stevenson (Adapted by) Jeffrey Hatcher	
Below the Belt	Richard Dresser	
the break/s	Marc Bamuthi Joseph	
Das Barbecü	Jim Luigs and Scott Warrender	
Runt of the Litter	Bo Eason	
Rock n' Roll	Tom Stoppard	
2008 Season	Playwright	Notes
The Ilkhom Theatre Festival	Ilkhom Theatre Company	A Seattle First
Fathers and Sons	Michael Bradford	World Premiere
A Marvelous Party: The Noël Coward Celebration	David Ira Goldstein	
Intimate Exchanges	Alan Ayckbourn	
Eurydice	Sarah Ruhl	
Becky's New Car	Steven Dietz	World Premiere
2007 Season	Playwright	Notes
The Clean House	Sarah Ruhl	
Souvenir	Stephen Temperley	
Stuff Happens	David Hare	
First Class	David Wagoner	World Premiere
The Mojo and the Sayso	Aishah Rahman	
The Women	Clare Boothe Luce	
2006 Season	Playwright	Notes
The Pillowman	Martin McDonagh	West Coast Premier
Miss Witherspoon	Christopher Durang	West Coast Premier
Wine in the Wilderness	Alice Childress	
Mitzi's Abortion	Elizabeth Heffron	World Premiere
A Number	Caryl Churchill	
The Underpants	Steve Martin	
2005 Season	Playwright	Notes
Bach at Leipzig	Itamar Moses	West Coast Premiere
The Ugly American	Mike Daisey	World Premiere
Born Yesterday	Garson Kanin	
The Night of the Iguana	Tennessee Williams	
Vincent in Brixton	Nicholas Wright	
Flight	Charlayne Woodard	
2004 Season	Playwright	Notes
Alki	Eric Overmyer	World Premiere
Enchanted April	Matthew Barber	
Jumpers	Tom Stoppard	
Good Boys	Jane Martin	West Coast Premiere
Fiction	Steven Dietz	West Coast Premiere
2003 Season	Playwright	Notes
Absurd Person Singular	Alan Ayckbourn	
The Goat, or Who Is Sylvia?	Edward Albee	West Coast Premiere
A Moon for the Misbegotten	Eugene O'Neill	
Omnium Gatherum	Theresa Rebeck and Alexandra Gersten-Vassilaros	West Coast Premiere
The Syringa Tree	Pamela Gien	Production went on to New York
2002 Season	Playwright	Notes
Mourning Becomes Electra	Eugene O'Neill	
Dirty Blonde	Claudia Shear	
Yellowman	Deal Orlandersmith	
Wintertime	Charles L. Mee	
Fuddy Meers	David Lindsay-Abaire	
The Education of Randy Newman	Randy Newman, Michael Roth, Jerry Patch	World Premiere
2001 Season	Playwright	Notes
Big Love	Charles L. Mee	West Coast Premiere
Dinner with Friends	Donald Margulies	
Polish Joke	David Ives	World Premiere
Waiting to Be Invited	S.M. Shephard-Massat	
A Little Night Music	Stephen Sondheim	
Grand Magic	Eduardo De Filippo	
2000 Season	Playwright	Notes
God of Vengeance	Donald Margulies, Sholem Asch	World Premiere
Talley's Folly	Lanford Wilson	
2.5 Minute Ride	Lisa Kron	
A Skull in Connemara	Martin McDonagh	Production went on to New York
In the Penal Colony	Philip Glass	World Premiere; production went on to New York
The Odd Couple	Neil Simon	
1999 Season	Playwright	Notes
The Crucible	Arthur Miller	
Goblin Market	Polly Pen & Peggy Harmon	
Stonewall Jackson's House	Jonathan Reynolds	
Temporary Help	David Wiltse	World Premiere; production went on to New York
Side Man	Warren Leight	West Coast Premiere
Communicating Doors	Alan Ayckbourn	
1998 Season	Playwright	Notes
Thunder Knocking on the Door	Keith Glover	
Death of a Salesman	Arthur Miller	
Collected Stories	Donald Margulies	
Scent of the Roses	Lisette Lecat Ross	World Premiere; production went on to New York
The Summer Moon	John Olive	World Premiere
Quills	Doug Wright	
Violet	Jeanine Tesori	
1997 Season	Playwright	Notes
The Notebook of Trigorin	Tennessee Williams	
The Nina Variations	Steven Dietz	
Room Service	John Murray and Allen Boretz	
Going to St. Ives	Lee Blessing	World Premiere
Blues for an Alabama Sky	Pearl Cleage	
Old Wicked Songs	John Marans	
The Big Slam	Bill Corbett	
1996 Season	Playwright	Notes
Arcadia	Tom Stoppard	
Avenue X	Jon Jiler and Ray Leslee	
Laughter on the 23rd Floor	Neil Simon	
Cheap	Tom Topor	World Premiere, First performance in ACT's new home at Kreielsheimer Place
The Crimson Thread	Mary Hanes	
My One Good Nerve	Ruby Dee	World Premiere
1995 Season	Playwright	Notes
The Gospel at Colonus	Lee Breuer and Bob Telson	
Hospitality	Allan Havis	
Handing Down the Names	Steven Dietz	World Premiere
Later Life	A.R. Gurney	
The Odd Couple	Neil Simon	
Tea	Velina Hasu Houston	
The Language of Flowers	Edit Villarreal	World Premiere
1994 Season	Playwright	Notes
Betty the Yeti	Jon Klein	
Gray's Anatomy	Jim Leonard Jr.	World Premiere
Keely and Du	Jane Martin	
Man of the Moment	Alan Ayckbourn	
Fish Head Soup	Philip Kan Gotanda	
Voices in the Dark	John Pielmeier	World Premiere
1993 Season	Playwright	Notes
The Red and the Black	Jon Klein	World Premiere
The Cover of Life	R.T. Robinson	
Lonely Planet	Steven Dietz	
Life During Wartime	Keith Reddin	
Agnes Smedley: Our American Friend	Doris Baizley	World Premiere
Dreams From a Summer House	Alan Ayckbourn and John Pattison	
1992 Season	Playwright	Notes
Trust	Steven Dietz	
Shadowlands	William Nicholson	
The Revengers' Comedies (Parts I and II)	Alan Ayckbourn	
Eleemosynary	Lee Blessing	
Sunsets and Glories	Peter Barnes	
1991 Season	Playwright	Notes
My Children! My Africa!	Athol Fugard	
The Illusion	Tony Kushner	
Tears of Rage	Doris Baizley	World Premiere
Our Country's Good	Timberlake Wertenbaker	
Willi: An Evening of Wilderness and Spirit	John Pielmeier	World Premiere
Halcyon Days	Steven Dietz	World Premiere
1990 Season	Playwright	Notes
An American Comedy	Richard Nelson	
Lloyd's Prayer	Kevin Kling	
A Normal Life	Erik Brogger	World Premiere
Born in the RSA	Barney Simon and The Market Theatre Company	
Four Our Fathers	Jon Klein	
Hapgood	Tom Stoppard	
1989 Season	Playwright	Notes
The Downside	Richard Dresser	
Breaking the Silence	Stephen Poliakoff	
A Walk in the Woods	Lee Blessing	
Red Noses	Peter Barnes	
Happenstance	Steven Dietz and Eric Bain Peltoniemi	World Premiere
Woman in Mind	Alan Ayckbourn	
1988 Season	Playwright	Notes
Merrily We Roll Along	Stephen Sondheim and George Furth	
Mrs. California	Doris Baizley	
A Chorus of Disapproval	Alan Ayckbourn	
God's Country	Steven Dietz	World Premiere
Principia Scriptoriae	Richard Nelson	
The Voice of the Prairie	John Olive	
1987 Season	Playwright	Notes
March of the Falsettos	William Finn	
A Lie of the Mind	Sam Shepard	
The Diary of a Scoundrel	Erik Brogger	
The Marriage of Bette and Boo	Christopher Durang	
Glengarry Glen Ross	David Mamet	
Biloxi Blues	Neil Simon	
1986 Season	Playwright	Notes
On the Razzle	Tom Stoppard	
Painting Churches	Tina Howe	
Tales from Hollywood	Christopher Hampton	
Brighton Beach Memoirs	Neil Simon	
The Jail Diary of Albie Sachs	David Edgar	
Little Shop of Horrors	Howard Ashman and Alan Menken	
1985 Season	Playwright	Notes
King Lear	William Shakespeare	
True West	Sam Shepard	
Maydays	David Edgar	
Other Places	Harold Pinter	
End of the World	Arthur Kopit	
Quartermaine's Terms	Simon Gray	
1984 Season	Playwright	Notes
Amadeus	Peter Shaffer	
Top Girls	Caryl Churchill	
Angels Fall	Lanford Wilson	
Thirteen	Lynda Myles	World Premiere
Fool for Love	Sam Shepard	
The Communication Cord	Brian Friel	
1983 Season	Playwright	Notes
The Dresser	Ronald Harwood	
The Dining Room	A.R. Gurney	
Crimes of the Heart	Beth Henley	
Educating Rita	Willy Russell	
A Soldier's Play	Charles Fuller	
Cloud 9	Caryl Churchill	
1982 Season	Playwright	Notes
Da	Hugh Leonard	
Fridays	Andrew Johns	
Waiting for the Parade	John Murrell	
The Gin Game	Donald L. Coburn	
The Greeks: The War (Part 1)	John Barton and Kenneth Cavander	
The Greeks: The War (Part 2)	John Barton and Kenneth Cavander	
1981 Season	Playwright	Notes
Custer	Robert E. Ingham	
Getting Out	Marsha Norman	
Billy Bishop Goes to War	John Gray with Eric Peterson	
Night and Day	Tom Stoppard	
Loose Ends	Michael Weller	
Whose Life Is It, Anyway?	Brian Clark	
1980 Season	Playwright	Notes
For Colored Girls Who Have Considered Suicide/When the Rainbow Is Enuf	Ntozake Shange	
Catholics	Brian Moore	World Premiere
Artichoke	Joanna Glass	
Wings	Arthur Kopit	
Buried Child	Sam Shepard	
Starting Here, Starting Now	Richard Maltby Jr. and David Shire	
1979 Season	Playwright	Notes
Man and Superman	George Bernard Shaw	
Fanshen	David Hare	
Otherwise Engaged	Simon Gray	
Holy Ghosts	Romulus Linney	
The Water Engine	David Mamet	
The Fantasticks	Tom Jones and Harvey Schmidt	
1978 Season	Playwright	Notes
Henry IV, Part I	William Shakespeare	
The Shadow Box	Michael Cristofer	
Ballymurphy	Michael Neville	World Premiere. Voted "Best of Season" by subscribers. Play went on to Manhattan Theatre Club.
The Sea Horse	Edward J. Moore	
Makassar Reef	Alexander Buzo	
Anything Goes	Cole Porter, Guy Bolton and P.G. Wodehouse	
1977 Season	Playwright	Notes
As You Like It	William Shakespeare	
Travesties	Tom Stoppard	
Ladyhouse Blues	Kevin O'Morrison	
Streamers	David Rabe	
The Club	Eve Merriam	
Absurd Person Singular	Alan Ayckbourn	
1976 Season	Playwright	Notes
Sizwe Bansi Is Dead	Athol Fugard, John Kani and Winston Ntshona	
The Time of Your Life	William Saroyan	
Scapino	Frank Dunlop and Jim Dale	
Desire Under the Elms	Eugene O'Neill	
Relatively Speaking	Alan Ayckbourn	
Boccaccio	Kenneth Cavander	
1975 Season	Playwright	Notes
Sleuth	Anthony Schaffer	
The Resistible Rise of Arturo Ui	Bertolt Brecht	
When You Comin' Back, Red Ryder?	Mark Medoff	
Quiet Caravans	Barry Dinerman	World Premiere
Of Mice and Men	John Steinbeck	
Oh Coward!	Roderick Cook	
1974 Season	Playwright	Notes
The Hot L Baltimore	Lanford Wilson	
Twigs	George Furth	
A Streetcar Named Desire	Tennessee Williams	
Count Dracula	Ted Tiller	
In Celebration	David Storey	
The Chairs/The Bald Soprano	Eugène Ionesco	
Godspell	Stephen Schwartz and John-Michael Tebelak	
1973 Season	Playwright	Notes
No Place to Be Somebody	Charles Cordone	
Old Times	Harold Pinter	
One Flew Over the Cuckoo's Nest	Dale Wasserman	
The Contractor	David Storey	
A Conflict of Interest	Jay Broad	
A Day in the Death of Joe Egg	Peter Nichols	
The Decline and Fall of the Entire World as Seen Through the Eyes of Cole Porter	Ben Bagley	
1972 Season	Playwright	Notes
The Me Nobody Knows	Gary William Friedman and Will Holt	
What the Butler Saw	Joe Orton	
The Effect of Gamma Rays on Man-in-the-Moon Marigolds	Paul Zindel	
Echoes	N. Richard Nash	World Premiere
The Trial of the Catonsville Nine	Fr. Daniel Berrigan	
Moonchildren	Michael Weller	
Butterflies Are Free	Leonard Gershe	
1971 Season	Playwright	Notes
Hadrian VII	Peter Luke	
The Boys in the Band	Mart Crowley	
The Night Thoreau Spent in Jail	Jerome Lawrence and Robert Lee	
Ceremonies in Dark Old Men	Lonne Elder III	
Plaza Suite	Neil Simon	
A Cry of Players	William Gibson	
You're a Good Man, Charlie Brown	Clark Gesner and John Gordon	
1970 Season	Playwright	Notes
The Birthday Party	Harold Pinter	On same bill as The Balcony
The Balcony	Jean Genet	On same bill as The Birthday Party
Rosencrantz and Guildenstern Are Dead	Tom Stoppard	
The Caucasian Chalk Circle	Bertolt Brecht	
The Prime of Miss Jean Brodie	Jay Presson Allen	
Endgame	Samuel Beckett	
Your Own Thing	Hal Hester and Danny Apolinar	
1969 Season	Playwright	Notes
Celebration	Tom Jones and Harvey Schmidt	
The Homecoming	Harold Pinter	
Rhinoceros	Eugène Ionesco	
Inadmissible Evidence	John Osborne	
Marat/Sade	Peter Weiss	
Philadelphia, Here I Come	Brian Friel	
Crabdance	Beverly Simons	World Premiere
1968 Season	Playwright	Notes
Slow Dance on the Killing Ground	William Hanley	
Eh?	Henry Livings	
Royal Hunt of the Sun	Peter Shaffer	
The Lion in Winter	James Goldman	
Black Comedy	Peter Shaffer	On same bill as Captain Fantastick Meets the Ectomorph
Captain Fantastick Meets the Ectomorph	Barry Pritchard	On same bill as Black Comedy
A Delicate Balance	Edward Albee	
Waiting for Godot	Samuel Beckett	
1967 Season	Playwright	Notes
Luv	Murray Schisgal	
The Deputy	Rolf Hochhuth	
Out at Sea/Striptease	Sławomir Mrożek	
After the Fall	Arthur Miller	
The Great Divide	William Vaughn Moody	
The Fantasticks	Tom Jones and Harvey Schmidt	
The Caretaker	Harold Pinter	
1966 Season	Playwright	Notes
In White America	Martin B. Duberman	
The Typist/The Tiger	Murray Schisgal	
Tiny Alice	Edward Albee	
A Thurber Carnival	James Thurber	
The Physicists	Friedrich Dürrenmatt	
Arsenic and Old Lace	Joseph Kesselring	
The Collection/The Room	Harold Pinter	
1965 Season	Playwright	Notes
Oh Dad, Poor Dad, Mamma's Hung You in the Closet and I'm Feeling So Sad	Arthur Kopit	
Cat on a Hot Tin Roof	Tennessee Williams	
Who'll Save the Plowboy?	Frank Gilroy	
Dark of the Moon	H. Richardson and William Berney	
The Private Ear/The Public Eye	Peter Shaffer	

Source (except as noted):
