= Derek Godfrey =

English actor (1924–1983)

Derek Godfrey (3 June 1924 – 18 June 1983) was an English actor, associated with the Royal Shakespeare Company from 1960, who also appeared in several films and BBC television dramatisations during the 1960s and 1970s.

== Career ==
Born in London, he performed with the Old Vic from 1956 where he played the roles of Iachimo and Enobarbus. With the Royal Shakespeare Company from 1960, he performed as Orsino, Hector, Petruchio and Malvolio. According to The Oxford Companion to Shakespeare, Godfrey "[w]ith his fine voice and often sardonic appearance...was a loyal company actor who revealed an intuitive grasp of the dark characters in Jacobean plays".

Also in 1960, he appeared on television in the series Danger Man in the episode entitled "Position of Trust" as a casino manager.

He created the role of Jack Gurney in Peter Barnes's play The Ruling Class. He also appeared in a number of films such as Hands of the Ripper and The Abominable Dr. Phibes, and the BBC television dramas The Pallisers (as Robert Kennedy), Warship (as Captain Edward Holt) and Nicholas Nickleby (1977, as Ralph Nickleby).

== Family ==
Derek Godfrey was married to Australian actress Diana Fairfax; the couple had two daughters.

== Filmography ==
Year	Title	Role	Notes
1962	Guns of Darkness	Hernandez	
1966	The Baron	The General	TV series episode 22 Night of the Hunter
1968	The Vengeance of She	Men-Hari	
1968	A Midsummer Night's Dream	Theseus	
1970	Julius Caesar	Decius Brutus	
1971	The Abominable Dr. Phibes	Crow	
1971	Hands of the Ripper	Dysart	
1976	John Macnab	Lord Lamancha	TV Mini-Series
1977	Jesus of Nazareth	Elihu	TV Mini-Series
