= For the Girl Who Has Everything =

For the Girl Who Has Everything may refer to:

- "For the Girl Who Has Everything" (song), a song by 'N Sync
- "For the Girl Who Has Everything" (Randall and Hopkirk (Deceased))
- "For the Girl Who Has Everything" (Supergirl), an episode of the television series Supergirl
