= The Cat with Ten Lives =

- UFO episode
- Episode no.: Episode 18
- Directed by: David Tomblin
- Written by: David Tomblin
- Editing by: Lee Doig
- Production code: 18
- Original air date: 30 September 1970

Guest appearances
- Alexis Kanner as Lieutenant Jim Regan; Lois Maxwell as Miss Holland; Steven Berkoff as Captain Steve Minto; Geraldine Moffat as Jean Regan; Colin Gordon as Albert Thompson; Eleanor Summerfield as Muriel Thompson; Windsor Davies as Morgan; Al Mancini as Lieutenant Andy Conroy

Episode chronology
← Previous "The Responsibility Seat"	Next → "The Sound of Silence"

"The Cat with Ten Lives" is the 18th episode of UFO, a 1970 British science fiction television series about an alien invasion of Earth. David Tomblin wrote the screenplay and directed the episode. The episode was filmed between 22 May and 3 June 1970 and was first broadcast on 30 September 1970 on Associated Television. It was the 19th episode filmed.

The series was created by Gerry Anderson and Sylvia Anderson with Reg Hill, and produced by the Andersons and Lew Grade's Century 21 Productions for Grade's ITC Entertainment company.

== Plot ==
Moonbase interceptor pilot James Regan is on 48 hours leave from the Moon. He and his wife are invited by an older couple, the Thompsons, who have mysteriously been given an unusual psychic board game. While the two couples are playing the game, Regan starts to have strange reactions and faints. Later, as Regan and his wife are driving down a country road they stop their car to avoid a Siamese cat. They are then abducted by aliens who take them to their UFO, where he has another experience similar to the one he had at the Thompson home. Regan awakes back in his car with the cat but his wife missing, abducted by the aliens. Regan explains his story at SHADO Control but Straker sends him back to the Moon. Meanwhile the cat now has free rein inside Control.

SHADO's resident doctor – Douglas Jackson – has performed an autopsy on an alien body and found it to be entirely human, not – as previously believed – an alien species that harvests human organs to extend its lifespan. He surmises that the aliens may be able to control human brains.

When piloting his SHADO Interceptor escorting the Venus probe, Regan fails to destroy a UFO that leaves Earth carrying his wife. He is recalled to Earth for an assessment. Still controlled by the cat, Regan attacks Col. Paul Foster and returns to the Moon, where he puts his interceptor on a crash course with Moonbase. Straker determines that the cat is controlling Regan and has it eliminated. No longer under alien control, Regan sacrifices himself by just missing Moonbase but is unable to avoid impacting on the lunar surface.

== Regular cast ==
- Ed Bishop as Commander Ed Straker
- Michael Billington as Colonel Paul Foster
- Dolores Mantez as Lieutenant Nina Barry
- Ayshea as Lieutenant Ayshea Johnson
- Vladek Sheybal as Dr Douglas Jackson
- Wanda Ventham as Colonel Virginia Lake

== Reception ==
Commentator Ian Fryer regards "The Cat with Ten Lives" as the "key episode" of UFO. Describing the episode as a "grown-up drama", he praises the realism of its Moonbase scenes (with their "constant undertone of strain and weariness"), as well as its affirmation of Straker's "fallibility" as SHADO leader. Fryer also compliments Sheybal's performance as Dr Jackson and Kanner's "brilliant, highly detailed" portrayal of Regan's instability.

By contrast, AnorakZone.com ranks "The Cat with Ten Lives" the seventh-worst episode of UFO, describing its story as "the strangest and most 'out there' [that] UFO ever did [...] funny for the wrong reasons, and watchable for same". Commenting that the plight of Regan's pregnant wife is "pushed down in the narrative in favour of a telepathic cat", the reviewer argues that compared to other episodes "The Cat with Ten Lives" feels "impossible to regard as part of the same series", adding that Kanner as Regan seems "like he's in a different programme to everyone else".

John Kenneth Muir criticises some aspects of the plot, arguing that SHADO is too trusting of the clearly affected Regan and careless in allowing an unknown cat to roam its control centre. Muir also suggests that the ending, with Regan sacrificing himself, has too much in common with other episodes. However, he praises the cinematography of the seance and abduction scenes, also calling the episode "gloriously filmed" and "one of the most stylishly presented in terms of mise-en-scène".
