= Hilfield Castle =

Country estate in Hertfordshire, England

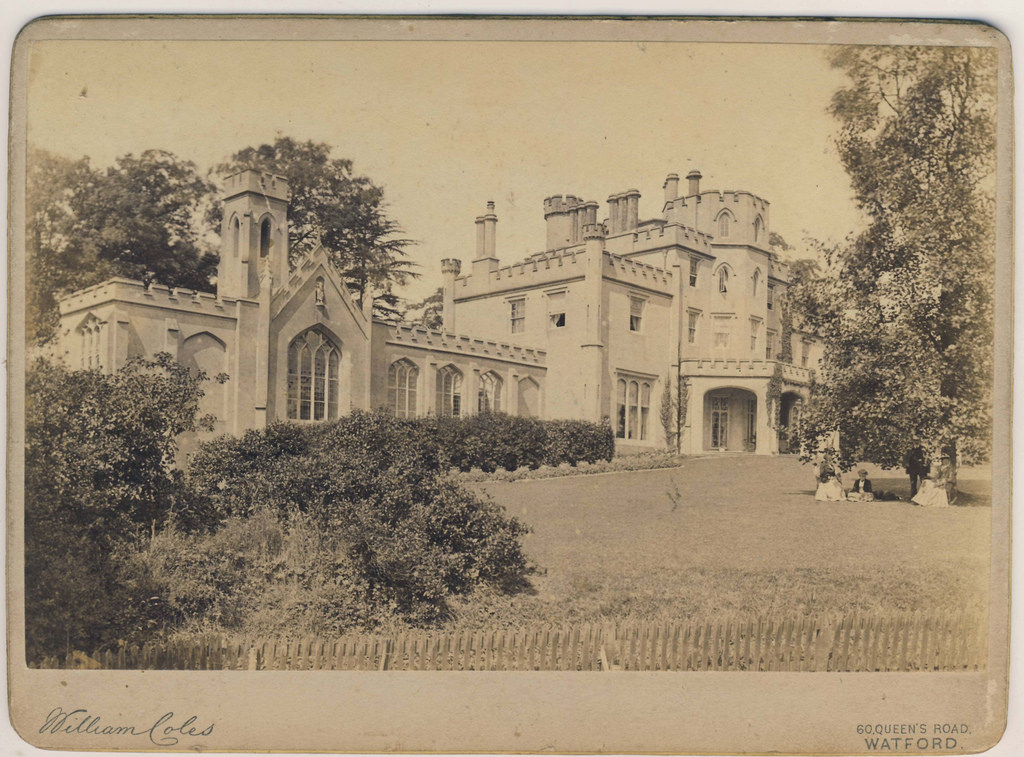
- Hilfield Castle, c. 1890

- Location within Hertfordshire

General information
- Architectural style: Gothic
- Location: Hilfield Lane, near Aldenham and Bushey, Hertfordshire, England
- Coordinates: 51.6536°N 0.3348°W
- Construction started: 1798
- Completed: 1799

Design and construction
- Architect: Jeffry Wyatt

Hilfield Castle, also Hilfield Lodge, is a country estate and house about 2 miles (3.2 km) east of Watford and 1 mile (1.6 km) southwest of Aldenham, in Hertfordshire, on the outskirts of London in the United Kingdom. The estate contains two large reservoirs, one of which was built by French prisoners of war in the 1790s. The grounds now form Aldenham Country Park. To the east is Elstree Aerodrome and the M1 motorway passes to the west.

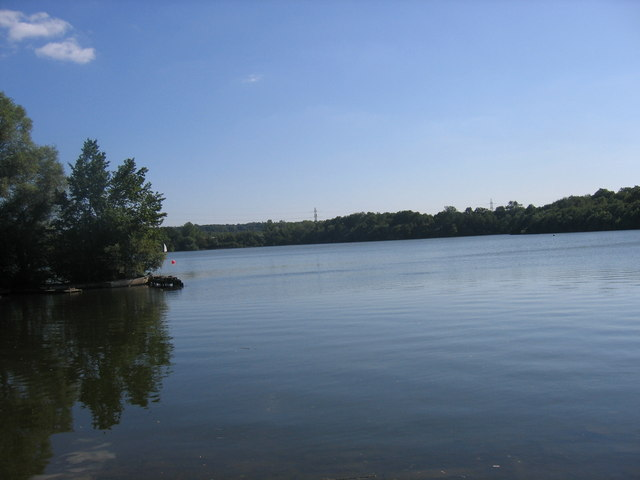
Aldenham Reservoir, the southern of the two reservoirs

== History and description ==
The castle dates to 1798–99, when it was built by architect Jeffry Wyatt for Hon. George Villiers, brother of the earl of Clarendon. to replace Slys Castle. It is a picturesque Gothic design, and the estate includes numerous cottages, barns and a boathouse on the reservoir.

Nikolaus Pevsner notes that it is a "castellated, turreted, and cemented house with a gatehouse complete with portcullis". He also notes that the entrance and south sides are symmetrical and that the conservatory is of "ecclesiastical appearance." The castle is built from brick with a 4-storey central tower "flanked by octagonal turrets to lower 4-storey bays with outer 2-storey bays with a later mansard attic." The turrets have slit windows, which are machicolated and crenellated. Of note is the "octagonal Breakfast Room with a vaulted ceiling and a Gothic conservatory." It became a Grade II* listed building on 1 June 1984. It is owned by the Jefferis family as a private house and is not open to the public.

It was sold in 1818 by Villiers to John Fam Timins. He had served in the British East India Company, for whom he had captained several East Indiamen; he had most notably participated in the Battle of Pulo Aura. When he died in 1843, his son William Raikes Timins succeeded him. He died in 1866, and was succeeded by his nephew the Rev. Douglas Cartwright Timins, who died in 1872, when Hilfield passed to his son Douglas Theodore, who sold the house and park in 1906 to the late Lord Aldenham.

== Reservoirs ==
The reservoir nearest to the house is called Hilfield Park Reservoir and is owned by Affinity Water. It is managed as a wildlife reserve by the Herts and Middlesex Wildlife Trust and is not open to the public except by appointment. It was built in 1953.

The more southerly reservoir is called Aldenham Reservoir and forms part of Aldenham Country Park. It is open to the public with trails and other attractions and hosts a sailing club. It was built by French prisoners of war during the Napoleonic war.

== Filming location ==
The castle has appeared in several TV series and films. It served as Peter Sellers' "Pavor Manor" in Stanley Kubrick's 1962 film Lolita. It was also featured in George Pollock's 1963 film Murder at the Gallop. Additionally, it appeared in a 1969 episode of Randall and Hopkirk (Deceased), "For the Girl Who Has Everything", in which it was occupied by Lois Maxwell. It also appeared in various episodes of Little Britain as the hotel run by the bizarre flute-playing Scottish character Ray McCooney, played by David Walliams.
