= The Ruling Class (film) =

1972 British film by Peter Medak

- Theatrical release poster
- Directed by: Peter Medak
- Written by: Peter Barnes
- Based on: The Ruling Class by Peter Barnes
- Produced by: Jules Buck; Jack Hawkins
- Starring: Peter O'Toole; Alastair Sim; Arthur Lowe; Harry Andrews; Coral Browne; Michael Bryant; Graham Crowden; Nigel Green; William Mervyn; Carolyn Seymour; James Villiers
- Cinematography: Ken Hodges
- Edited by: Ray Lovejoy
- Music by: John Cameron
- Distributed by: United Artists (UK theatrical); AVCO Embassy Pictures
- Release date: 13 September 1972
- Running time: 154 minutes
- Country: United Kingdom
- Language: English
- Budget: $1.4 million

The Ruling Class is a 1972 British black comedy film. It is an adaptation of Peter Barnes' satirical 1968 stage play The Ruling Class, which tells the story of a paranoid schizophrenic British nobleman (played by Peter O'Toole) who inherits a peerage. The film co-stars Alastair Sim, William Mervyn, Coral Browne, Harry Andrews, Carolyn Seymour, James Villiers and Arthur Lowe. It was produced by Jules Buck and directed by Peter Medak.

The film has been described as a "commercial failure ... [that] has since become a cult classic"; Peter O'Toole described it as "a comedy with tragic relief".

== Plot ==
Following the death from accidental asphyxiation of Ralph Gurney, 13th Earl of Gurney, Jack Gurney becomes the 14th Earl of Gurney. Jack, a paranoid schizophrenic, thinks he is Jesus Christ and shocks his family and friends with his talk of returning to the world to bring it love and charity, not to mention his penchant for breaking out into song and dance routines and sleeping upright on a cross. When faced with unpalatable facts (such as his identity as the 14th Earl), Jack puts them in his "galvanized pressure cooker" and they disappear. His unscrupulous uncle, Sir Charles, marries him to his mistress, Grace, in hopes of producing an heir and putting his nephew in an institution; the plan fails, however, when Grace falls in love with Jack. Jack gains another ally in Sir Charles' wife, Lady Claire, who hates her husband and befriends Jack just to spite him. She also begins sleeping with Jack's psychiatrist, Dr. Herder, to persuade him to cure Jack quickly.

Herder attempts to cure him through intensive psychotherapy, to no avail; Jack so thoroughly believes that he is the "God of Love" that he dismisses any suggestion to the contrary as insane. The night his wife goes into labour, Herder makes a last effort at curing Jack; he introduces Jack to McKyle, a patient who also believes himself to be Christ – or as the patient puts it, "The High Voltage Messiah" – who subjects an unwitting Jack to electroshock therapy. The plan works, and as Grace is delivered of a healthy baby boy, Jack proclaims "I'm Jack, I'm Jack". His family takes this to mean that he has returned to his senses, but in reality he now believes himself to be Jack the Ripper.

Sir Charles sends for a court-appointed psychiatrist to evaluate Jack, confident that his nephew will be sent to an asylum for life. He is once again thwarted when the psychiatrist discovers that Jack was a fellow Old Etonian, bonds with him and declares him sane.

Jack murders Lady Claire in a fit of rage when the ageing woman tries to seduce him. He frames the Communist family butler, Tucker, for the murder. Sir Charles suffers a debilitating stroke shortly afterward, and Dr. Herder has a nervous breakdown upon realizing what Jack has done. Jack assumes his place in the House of Lords with a fiery speech in favour of capital and corporal punishment. His colleagues applaud wildly, completely unaware the speech is the ranting of a lunatic. When seen through his eyes, his colleagues – singing "Onward, Christian Soldiers" – appear to be rotting corpses. Their enthusiasm contrasts with the unfavourable reaction when Jack believed he was Christ. That night, he murders Grace for expressing her love for him. Her terrified scream is matched by the sound of a baby cooing "I'm Jack, I'm Jack", suggesting that their son – the Heir apparent – has inherited Jack's madness.

== Cast ==
- Peter O'Toole – Jack Gurney, 14th Earl of Gurney
- Coral Browne – Lady Claire
- William Mervyn – Sir Charles
- James Villiers – Dinsdale, Sir Charles and Lady Claire's son
- Arthur Lowe – Tucker
- Alastair Sim – Bishop Lampton
- Carolyn Seymour – Grace
- Michael Bryant – Dr. Herder
- Graham Crowden – Dr. Truscott
- Harry Andrews – Ralph Gurney, 13th Earl of Gurney
- Hugh Owens – The toastmaster
- Hugh Burden – Matthew Peake
- Henry Woolf, Griffith Davies, Oliver MacGreevy – Inmates
- Kay Walsh – Mrs. Piggott-Jones
- Patsy Byrne – Mrs. Treadwell
- Nigel Green – McKyle
- Cyril Appleton, Leslie Schofield – McKyle's assistants
- Joan Cooper – Nurse Brice
- Declan Mulholland – A poacher
- James Grout – Inspector Brockett
- James Hazeldine – Fraser
- Ronald Adam, Julian D'Albie, Llewellyn Rees – Lords
- Kenneth Benda – Lord Chancellor

== Production ==
O'Toole held the rights to Barnes's play; Peter Medak approached O'Toole repeatedly about exercising those rights. According to Medak, the project got started one night that he and O'Toole were returning from the theatre, which "meant stopping at every pub between Soho and Hampstead, and it didn't matter if it was after closing hour because he would knock on the door and just say 'Peter's here,' and every door opened for him". Later on, at O'Toole's apartment, the deeply inebriated actor phoned his manager and said, "I'm with the crazy Hungarian and I know I'm drunk but I give you 24 hours to set this movie up." The next day, Medak received a call from United Artists and a deal was put together to shoot The Ruling Class.

Peter Barnes adapted the screenplay from his 1968 original, with few major changes. Filmed at the sprawling estate of Harlaxton Manor, with the interiors reconstructed on sound stages, the production cost $1.4 million, with O'Toole working for free (he was instead paid a great deal for the big-budget Man of La Mancha, released by the same studio later the same year).

The Ruling Class was the official British entry at the 1972 Cannes Film Festival.

== Reception ==
The film divided critics. The New York Times described it as "fantastic fun" and Variety called it "brilliantly caustic", but the Los Angeles Times called it "snail-slow, shrill and gesticulating" and Newsweek said it was a "sledgehammer satire". Jay Cocks called the screenplay a "snarling, overwrought and somewhat parochial satire on aristocracy and privileged morality"; he called the film "wretchedly photographed...as if it were shot under floodlights". In contrast Cocks praised the performances by Lowe, Mervyn, Browne, Alastair Sim and James Villiers, but reserved most of his praise for O'Toole, saying his performance is of "such intensity that it may trouble sleep as surely as it will haunt memory. All actors can play insanity; few play it well. O'Toole begins where other actors stop, with the unfocused gaze, the abrupt bursts of frenzied high spirits and precipitous depressions. Funny, disturbing, finally devastating, O'Toole finds his way into the workings of madness, revealing the anger and consuming anguish at the source." John Simon described The Ruling Class as a "delightful satire".

Despite mixed critical reaction to the film, O'Toole's performance was universally praised and garnered numerous prestigious awards and prizes, including an Academy Award nomination for Best Actor. Reportedly, when United Artists, its North American distributor, told producer Jules Buck that it would be cutting the film extensively for US release, Buck punched the company's London representative and bought the film back. Avco Embassy then bought the distribution rights and cut the film's 154-minute running time by six minutes.

The film was banned by the South African Publications Control Board.

In a review nearly 30 years after The Ruling Class was first released, Ian Christie said the film is "unashamedly theatrical, and it emerges from a particularly interesting period in English culture when theatre and cinema together were mining a rich vein of flamboyant self-analysis. Many stage works of this period cry out for filmic extension—in fact, Medak had just filmed a very different play that mingled fantasy and reality by a writer often bracketed with Barnes, Peter Nichols’ A Day in the Death of Joe Egg. But what makes The Ruling Class exceptional (and difficult for some) are its outrageous mixing of genres and its sheer ambition. Not only are there allusions to Shakespeare and Marlowe, but also to Wilde and Whitehall farce; to the gentility of Ealing Studios, with a plot that distantly evokes that other great black comedy Kind Hearts and Coronets, and to Hammer's gore-fests."

== Awards and nominations ==
- 1972 National Board of Review of Motion Pictures - Won NBR Award (Best Actor) - Peter O'Toole
- 1972 Cannes Film Festival - Nominated for the Palme d'Or
- 1973 Academy Awards - Nominated for the Academy Award for Best Actor - Peter O'Toole
- 1973 Golden Globe Awards - Nominated for the Golden Globe for Best English Language Foreign Film

== Subsequent history ==
In 1974, following an earlier-than-normal TV screening of the film on BBC Television that broke a gentlemen's agreement allowing a "window" of theatrical distribution before any TV screening, the UK's Cinematograph Exhibitors' Association (the theatrical distributors' association) recommended its members blacklist all future movies produced by Jules Buck.

Embassy Pictures re-released the film in May 1983.
