= Sunsets and Glories =

Play by Peter Barnes

Sunsets and Glories is a play by noted playwright and Academy Award-nominated screenwriter Peter Barnes. The play is based on the brief reign of Pope Celestine V. It incorporates grotesque humor and revisits motifs from Barnes' previous plays The Ruling Class, Noonday Demons, and The Bewitched.

Barnes originally wrote the play in 1985. It was first directed by Stuart Burge, who had directed Barnes' Ruling Class at the Nottingham Playhouse 22 years earlier. The production starred Freddie Jones as Pope Celestine V and Marius Goring as Cardinal Latino Malabranca Orsini, Sunsets and Glories premiered at the 1990 opening of the new West Yorkshire Playhouse on the Quarry Hill site, Leeds.
