= Eagles Auditorium Building =

- U.S. National Register of Historic Places
- Seattle Landmark
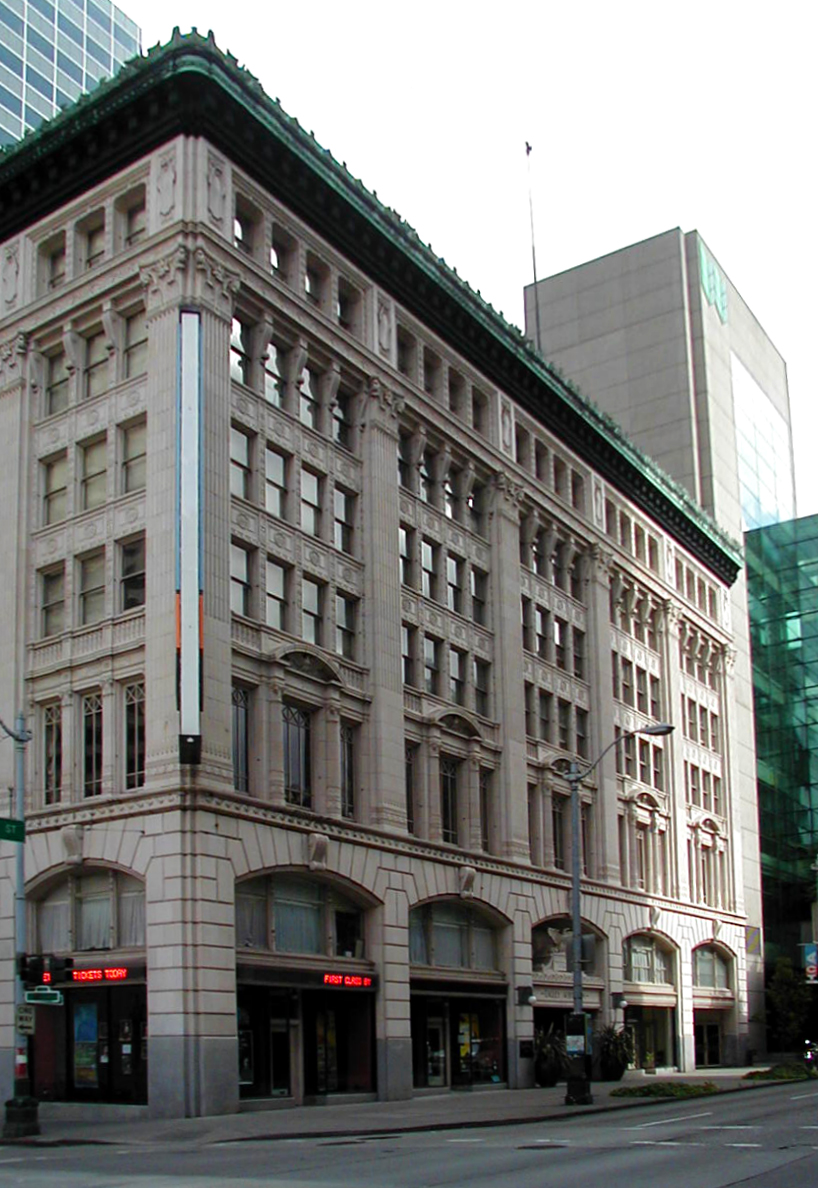
- View of Eagles Auditorium from Union Street, September 2007.
- Location: 700 Union Street; Seattle, Washington
- Nearest city: Seattle, Washington
- Coordinates: 47°36′39″N 122°19′56.7″W
- Built: 1924-25
- Architect: Henry Bittman
- Architectural style: Renaissance Revival
- NRHP reference No.: 83003338

Significant dates
- Added to NRHP: July 14, 1983
- Designated SEATL: May 6, 1985

The Eagles Auditorium Building is a seven-story historic theatre and apartment building in Seattle, Washington. Located at 1416 Seventh Avenue, at the corner of Seventh and Union Street, the Eagles Auditorium building has been the home to ACT Theatre since 1996. It was listed on the National Register of Historic Places (NRHP) on July 14, 1983. has two stages, a cabaret, and 44 residential apartments. From the outset, the building was also in part an apartment building, originally under the name Senator Apartments: the four-story grand ballroom was surrounded on three sides by apartments. with many of the apartment buildings located near streetcar lines. The current configuration of the building, under the official name Kreielsheimer Place, has two stages, a cabaret, and 44 residential apartments.

The elaborately terracotta-covered building (designed by the Henry Bittman firm) has been known at times in the past as the Eagles Temple and as the Senator Hotel. The building was Aerie No. 1 of the Fraternal Order of Eagles (which was founded in Seattle). It was one of several places where Martin Luther King, Jr. spoke November 10, 1961, on his only visit to Seattle. The building also served as the home of the Unity Church of Truth from the mid-1950s until 1960, and was a major rock concert venue from the mid-1960s until 1970. Among other groups, such as Jethro Tull and The Doors, the Grateful Dead performed here eight times in 1967 and 1968.

Besides its NRHP listing, the building is also an officially designated city landmark, ID #112272.

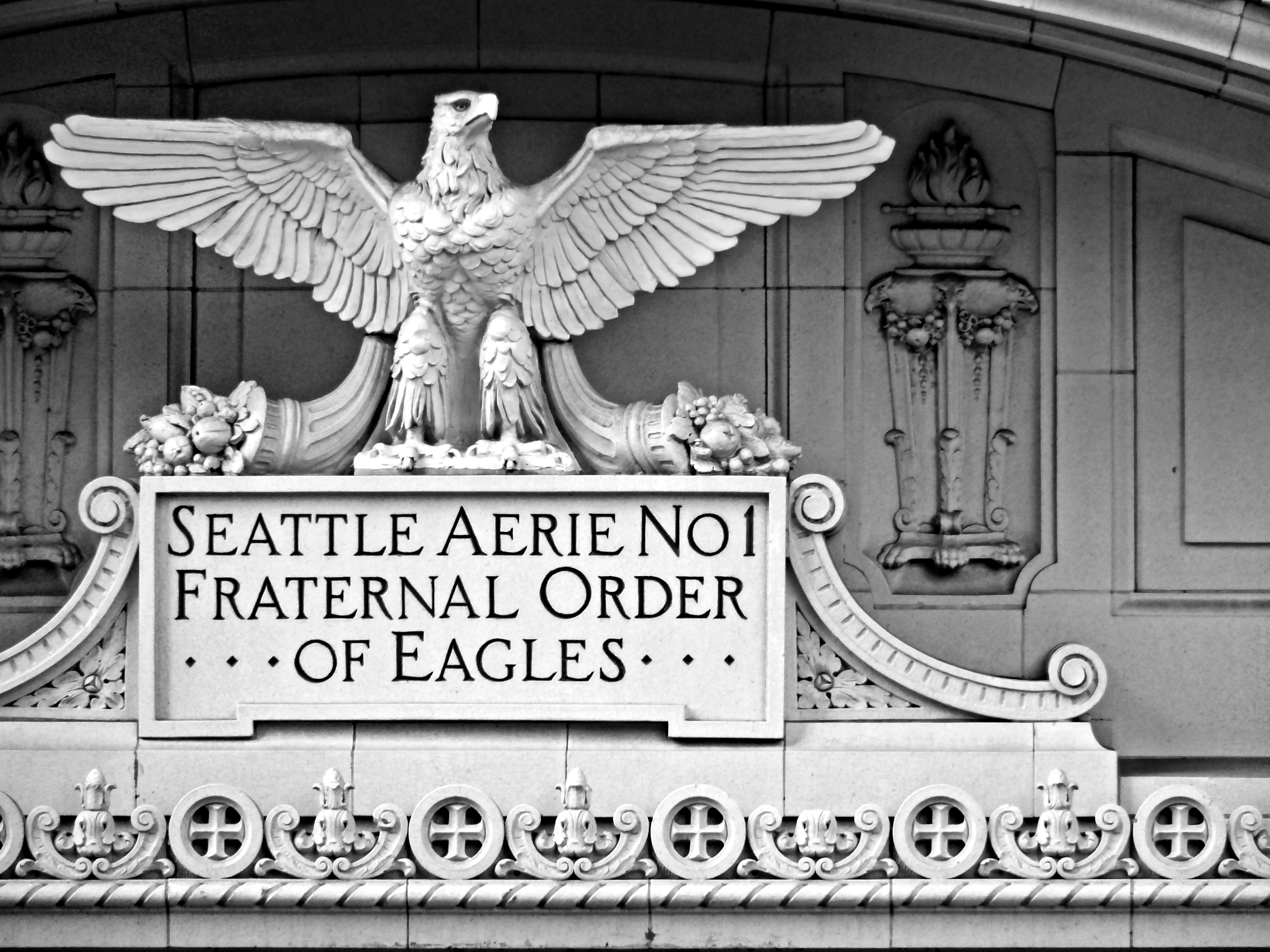
Terracotta eagle on the Eagles Auditorium
