= The Ghost Who Saved the Bank at Monte Carlo =

- Randall and Hopkirk (Deceased) episode
- Episode no.: Season 1 Episode 11
- Directed by: Jeremy Summers
- Written by: Tony Williamson
- Production code: 11
- Original air date: 30 November 1969

Guest appearances
- Brian Blessed; Mary Merrall

Episode chronology
← Previous "When did You Start to Stop Seeing Things?"	Next → "For the Girl who Has Everything"

"The Ghost who Saved the Bank at Monte Carlo" is the eleventh episode of the 1969 ITC British television series Randall and Hopkirk (Deceased) starring Mike Pratt, Kenneth Cope and Annette Andre. The episode was first broadcast on 30 November 1969 on the ITV. Directed by Jeremy Summers.

== Cast ==
- Mike Pratt as Jeff Randall
- Kenneth Cope as Marty Hopkirk
- Annette Andre as Jeannie Hopkirk
- Mary Merrall .... Clara Faringham
- Brian Blessed .... Jim Lawsey
- Veronica Carlson .... Suzanne
- Clive Cazes .... Claude
- Nicolas Chagrin .... Andre
- Nicholas Courtney .... Max
- Roger Croucher .... Terry
- Roger Delgado .... Tapiro
- Hans De Vries .... Hibert
- Eva Enger .... Young Lady
- Michael Forrest .... Verrier
- Richard Pescud .... Hotel Receptionist
- John Sharp .... Sagran
- Colin Vancao .... French Croupier

== Home media ==
The episode was released on VHS and several times on DVD with differing special features.

== Production ==
During the filming of this episode, Nicholas Courtney (Max) and Roger Delgado (Tapiro) met for the first time; they are best known for their recurring roles in Doctor Who in the early 1970s, playing Brigadier Lethbridge-Stewart and the Master respectively. They appeared in a total of seven serials together from 1971 to 1972, all of which starred Jon Pertwee as the Third Doctor.
