= But What a Sweet Little Room =

- Randall and Hopkirk (Deceased) episode
- Episode no.: Season 1 Episode 13
- Directed by: Roy Ward Baker
- Written by: Ralph Smart
- Production code: 13
- Original air date: 14 December 1969

Guest appearances
- Michael Goodliffe; Doris Hare; Norman Bird; Raymond Young; Anne De Vigier

Episode chronology
← Previous "For the Girl who Has Everything"	Next → "Who Killed Cock Robin?"

"But What a Sweet Little Room" is the thirteenth episode of the 1969 ITC British television series Randall and Hopkirk (Deceased) starring Mike Pratt, Kenneth Cope and Annette Andre. The episode was first broadcast on 14 December 1969 on the ITV. It was directed by Roy Ward Baker.

== Synopsis ==
Jeff investigates the disappearance of a wealthy young woman's aunt. When she too is killed he is led to the regular meetings of a medium, Madame Hanska, and uses Jeannie as a decoy to foil a thieving operation in which a gang of three middle-class men murder and rob rich middle-aged widows by taking them on an apparently innocent excursion to a cottage in the county.

== Overview ==
In this episode Marty contacts a phoney psychic medium who claims to be able to contact the dead husbands and wives of well-heeled middle-aged widows and widowers. To the fake medium's extreme surprise he is then able to materialise as a ghost in front of her (the first real ghost she has ever seen in her long career) and gets her to confess to receiving money from the gang of three middle-class men in return for setting up séances at which they target wealthy widows and lure them to their deaths. She shows a genuine sense of fear and remorse over her wrongdoing when confronted by Marty the ghost.

This is a particularly macabre episode (very different from the almost slapstick comedic atmosphere of The Ghost of Monte Carlo) with the sudden unexpected grisly death of the widow in an airtight room, initially masquerading as a delightful cottage drawing room or study (the room that gives its name to the episode title), shown in graphic detail at the start of the program. Only later on in the episode does it become clear why such a bizarre and elaborate means of murdering the widows has been constructed by the scriptwriters when Jeff is also nearly gassed to death in the same room only to be saved at the last moment with Marty's usual spiritual assistance.

== Cast ==
- Mike Pratt as Jeff Randall
- Kenneth Cope as Marty Hopkirk
- Annette Andre as Jeannie Hopkirk
- Frances Bennett .... Anne Fenwick
- Norman Bird .... Elliot
- Joby Blanshard .... Police Inspector
- Anne De Vigier .... Julia Fenwick
- Chris Gannon .... Salesman
- Michael Goodliffe .... Arthur de Crecy
- Doris Hare .... Madame Hanska
- Cyril Renison .... Andrews
- Betty Woolfe .... Martha
- Raymond Young .... Rawlings

== Production ==
Although the 13th episode in the series, But What a Sweet Little Room was actually the second episode to be shot, filmed in June–July 1968.
