= The Responsibility Seat =

- UFO episode
- Episode no.: Episode 17
- Directed by: Alan Perry
- Written by: Tony Barwick
- Cinematography by: Brendan J. Stafford
- Editing by: Harry MacDonald
- Production code: 10
- Original air date: 2 January 1971

Cast
- Ed Bishop as Commander Straker; George Sewell as Colonel Freeman; Gabrielle Drake as Lieutenant Ellis; Michael Billington as Colonel Foster; Dolores Mantez as Lieutenant Barry; Antonia Ellis as Lieutenant Harrington; Keith Alexander as Lieutenant Ford; Gary Myers as Captain Waterman; Norma Ronald as Miss Ealand; Jeremy Wilkin as Lieutenant Maxwell; Ayshea Brough as Lieutenant Johnson; Georgina Moon as Lieutenant Howell; Jane Merrow as Josephine Fraser; Patrick Jordan as Russian commander; Penny Spencer as a SHADO operative; Mel Oxley as the voice of SID

Episode chronology
← Previous "Computer Affair"	Next → "The Cat with Ten Lives"

"The Responsibility Seat" is the 17th episode of UFO, a British science fiction television series made by Century 21 Productions for ITC Entertainment. The tenth episode to be shot, it was written by Tony Barwick and directed by Alan Perry. It was filmed in August and September 1969 at MGM-British Studios in Hertfordshire and on location in London.

Set in the 1980s, UFO depicts a secret organisation – Supreme Headquarters Alien Defence Organisation (SHADO) – attempting to thwart an alien invasion involving UFOs. In "The Responsibility Seat", commander-in-chief Ed Straker (Ed Bishop) leaves a reluctant Colonel Freeman (George Sewell) in charge of SHADO while he deals with a security leak involving a journalist (Jane Merrow), to whom there is more than meets the eye.

"The Responsibility Seat" first aired on 2 January 1971 in Canada and 3 March 1971 in the UK. It was postponed in some parts of the UK due to a scene of partial nudity. At least one review found the plot sexist.

== Plot ==
In his public guise as head of Harlington-Straker Film Studios, Commander Straker grants an interview to Josephine Fraser, a reporter with the Global Press Agency. Straker welcomes Fraser to his office and Fraser records the interview on tape. After the interview, Straker leaves to take a walk, while Fraser goes back to retrieve the tape, which she left behind. This happens at the same time Lieutenant Ford – working in SHADO Headquarters beneath the studios – calls Straker's intercom, addressing him by his military rank. Returning to the empty office, Straker learns of the security breach and sets off in his car to find Fraser. He leaves Colonel Freeman in command of SHADO.

Using the studios' record of Fraser's car registration, Straker tracks the reporter to a motel. After handing over the tape, Fraser hits Straker with her handbag, knocking him down, and then flees in her car. Straker gives chase and eventually forces Fraser off the road. He appears to take pity on her and drives them both to a bar. As they become acquainted, Fraser admits that she is not a high-flying journalist, but a failing freelancer struggling to make ends meet. Straker takes Fraser back to his house for dinner. He phones his secretary, Miss Ealand, and draws Fraser into the conversation. This enables SHADO to record Fraser's voice and check it against security databases. After dinner, Straker and Fraser continue to bond, with Straker opening up about the pain of his divorce. They kiss, and Fraser moves to the bedroom while Straker answers Ealand's return call: the voiceprint scan has identified Fraser as a known con artist. Believing that seduction will lead to blackmail, Straker orders Fraser out of his house. Fraser leaves, fuming "It's a man's world."

With Straker away, Freeman is put to the test when a UFO squadron approaches Earth. SHADO Moonbase Interceptors shoot down all but one of the spacecraft, which appears to enter Earth's atmosphere. However, when Sky 1 is launched to eliminate the survivor, the radar trace is found to be a weather balloon. Later, a fast-moving object is detected on the lunar surface. It is a Russian mining rig on a collision course with Moonbase. Neither SHADO nor the Russian lunar base can raise the rig, and it is unclear whether the cosmonauts aboard are aware of the danger. On Freeman's orders, Colonel Foster takes a Moonmobile out onto the surface and fires several warning shots at the rig. However, it does not slow down or change course. Exiting the Moonmobile, Foster jumps onto the rig as it passes. He enters the cockpit, where the cosmonauts have been rendered incapable by hypoxia due to defective life support. He fights for control and pulls the master power switch, bringing the rig to a halt metres from Moonbase. The Russian base commander radios his thanks.

The next day, Straker returns to work. Relieved to be resuming his normal duties, Freeman gladly hands command – or as Straker calls it, the "responsibility seat" – back to Straker.

== Production ==
The episode was filmed between 21 August and 2 September 1969, mostly at MGM-British Studios and on surrounding studio lots. It re-used props and costumes from Century 21's film Doppelgänger. These included the space helmets worn by the Moonbase personnel and Fraser's (Jane Merrow) dress, which was originally made for Doppelgänger character Lise Hartman (Loni von Friedl).

Straker and Fraser's car chase was shot on London's Crystal Palace Circuit. Location footage re-used from earlier episodes included shots of Windermere Hall in Edgware as the motel exterior, a property in Ringshall, Berkhamsted as the outside of Straker's house, and another property in Letchmore Heath.

The wheels of rig miniature model were made from sink plungers. Incidental music included a library excerpt of the Wagner opera Siegfried, as well as cues originally recorded for the Thunderbirds episode "Pit of Peril".

== Broadcast ==
"The Responsibility Seat" first aired on 2 January 1971 on the CTV Television Network in Canada. In the UK, it was first broadcast on 3 March 1971 by Anglia Television.

Due to its content, "The Responsibility Seat" had a fragmented first broadcast around the UK. Some ITV franchises postponed the episode because of the scene in which Straker almost falls for Fraser, which shows actress Jane Merrow in lingerie. Associated Television first aired the episode in 1973, in a late-night timeslot instead of the primetime spot given to other UFO episodes. London Weekend Television did not show it until 1975, also in a late slot.

== Reception ==
Review website The Anorak Zone rated "The Responsibility Seat" the fifth-worst episode of UFO, as well as "one of the most sexist". The website criticised its "nonsense mess of a story" and "lacklustre" editing, also stating that the cosmonauts have "the worst 'Russian' accents you've ever heard". It also questioned Freeman's lack of confidence as acting SHADO commander, pointing out that like Straker, he holds the rank of colonel and has presumably had to take charge before. Despite this, it summed up the episode as "a mishmash of inanity that's somehow easy to love". Paul Cornell, Martin Day and Keith Topping, who describe "The Responsibility Seat" as "a straightforward tale of the isolation of command", regard the episode as one of several with mature themes that "made the series' reputation."

John Kenneth Muir interpreted the episode as a "commentary on sexism" rather than sexist in itself. Viewing Fraser as a woman fighting injustice in a male-dominated society, and arguing that Straker's interest is partly due to loneliness, Muir wrote: "[T]he sexist reading of this episode is that Straker falls for an attractive con-woman, one who uses her looks to get ahead. I think my reading is preferable, however, because it suggests that Fraser is fighting for more than merely herself [... and that Straker is ...] not just a man running after an attractive woman, [...] but a man looking for an escape from 'responsibility'." He commented that while the near-future world of UFO seems to have overcome racism, sexism has endured. Muir also noted themes of duty versus freedom, writing that Straker "wants to escape the so-called 'responsibility seat', and Jo is the perfect example of someone else who has done so." He added that the plot about Freeman standing in for Straker offers "an administrator's view of responsibility and pressure ... [Freeman] is thousands of miles from the actual action, but knows the buck stops with him."
