= Never Mention Murder =

1964 British film by John Nelson Burton

- Theatrical release poster
- Directed by: John Nelson Burton
- Screenplay by: Robert Banks Stewart
- Based on: a story by Edgar Wallace
- Produced by: Jack Greenwood
- Starring: Maxine Audley; Dudley Foster; Michael Coles
- Cinematography: James Wilson
- Edited by: Geoffrey Muller
- Production company: Merton Park Studios
- Distributed by: Anglo-Amalgamated
- Release date: 1964
- Running time: 55 minutes
- Country: United Kingdom
- Language: English

Never Mention Murder is a 1964 British second feature film directed by John Nelson Burton and starring Maxine Audley, Dudley Foster and Michael Coles. Part of the series of Edgar Wallace Mysteries films made at Merton Park Studios, it is based on a story by Wallace.

== Plot ==
Liz Teasdale is having an affair with cabaret entertainer Tony Sorbo. Her husband, surgeon Philip Teasdale, has employed sleazy private investigator Felix Carstairs to tail them. As Sorbo and his wife Zita are performing their mindreading act at a hotel, Teasdale substitutes drugs for Sorbo's anti-smoking pills. Sorbo suffers a heart attack and is taken to hospital where Teasdale prepares to operate. The unexpected requirement to give a lecture to an audience of student nurses foils his plan to kill Sorbo on the operating table. Carstairs tells Zita what has been going on, and to cover his tracks Teasdale kills Carstairs. He prepares to perform a second operation on Sorbo, but this time Zita, Liz and the police are watching.

== Cast ==
- Maxine Audley as Liz Teasdale
- Dudley Foster as Philip Teasdale
- Michael Coles as Tony Sorbo
- Pauline Yates as Zita
- Brian Haines as Felix Carstairs
- Peter Butterworth as porter
- Philip Stone as inspector
- Henley Thomas as Merrick
- Moya O'Sullivan as theatre sister
- Donald Oliver as anaesthetist
- Katie Fitzroy as nurse
- Jean Dallas as nurse
- Patsy Smart as nurse
- Bill Horsley as Philip
- Patrick Carter as barman
- Patrick Newell as barman

== Critical reception ==
The Monthly Film Bulletin wrote: "Such a very tall story, played for laughs, could have been wildly funny. Unfortunately, everybody concerned takes all the silliness absolutely seriously – to rather unexciting effect. Visually, an obviously tiny budget is used with only moderate imagination, but a doctor, for once, on the wrong side of the law does make a change."
