= Who Killed Cock Robin? (Randall and Hopkirk (Deceased)) =

"Who Killed Cock Robin?"
- Randall and Hopkirk (Deceased) episode
- Episode no.: Season 1 Episode 14
- Directed by: Roy Ward Baker
- Written by: Tony Williamson
- Production code: 14
- Original air date: 21 December 1969

Episode chronology
← Previous "But What a Sweet Little Room"	Next → "The Man From Nowhere"

"Who Killed Cock Robin?" is the fourteenth episode of the ITC British television series Randall and Hopkirk (Deceased), starring Mike Pratt, Kenneth Cope and Annette Andre. The episode was first broadcast on 21 December 1969 on ITV.

== Synopsis ==
In this murder mystery, Jeff Randall is hired by a large estate manager to investigate a series of bird shootings in the manor aviary and to keep guard of the valuable birds. On the death of the birds the over £2 million estate will be shared among the family, but each member of the family is killed off gradually narrowing down the suspects leaving Jeff with the surprising culprit. Randall is nearly killed in an intricate trap, but Marty Hopkirk once again saves the day — this time by affecting a paranormal game of letters to spell a cryptic message to Jeannie Hopkirk at a party.

== Cast ==
- Mike Pratt as Jeff Randall
- Kenneth Cope as Marty Hopkirk
- Annette Andre as Jeannie Hopkirk
- Ivor Dean ... Inspector Large
- Susan Broderick ... Carol
- Gabrielle Brune ... Mrs. Howe
- Tenniel Evans ... James Howe
- Michael Goldie ... Gimbal
- Maurice Hedley ... Col. Chalmers
- Philip Lennard ... Johns
- David Lodge ... Beeches
- Cyril Luckham ... Laverick
- Jane Merrow ... Sandra Joyce
- Leslie Schofield... Peter
- David Webb ... Police Sergeant

== Production ==
Although the 14th episode in the series, Who Killed Cock Robin? was the 6th episode to be shot, filmed in August–September 1968. The manor featured in the episode is Edgwarebury Hotel and Country Club.
