= Hands of the Ripper =

1971 British film by Peter Sasdy

- Theatrical release poster
- Directed by: Peter Sasdy
- Written by: L.W. Davidson; Edward Spencer Shew
- Produced by: Aida Young
- Starring: Eric Porter; Angharad Rees; Jane Merrow; Keith Bell; Derek Godfrey
- Cinematography: Kenneth Talbot
- Edited by: Chris Barnes
- Music by: Christopher Gunning
- Production company: Hammer Film Productions
- Distributed by: Rank Film Distributors (U.K.); Universal Pictures (U.S.)
- Release dates: 17 October 1971 (UK); 15 July 1972 (US)
- Running time: 85 minutes
- Language: English

Hands of the Ripper is a 1971 British horror film directed by Peter Sasdy and starring Eric Porter, Angharad Rees and Jane Merrow. It was produced by Aida Young for Hammer Film Productions, and written by L. W. Davidson from a story by Edward Spencer Shew. The film was released in the U.S. as a double feature with Twins of Evil (1971).

== Plot ==
As a three-year-old, the daughter of Jack the Ripper is witness to the brutal murder of her mother by her father. Fifteen years later, she is a troubled young girl who is seemingly possessed by the spirit of her late father. While in a psychotic trance she continues his murderous spree, but has no recollection of the events afterwards. A sympathetic psychiatrist takes her in and is convinced he can cure her condition. However, he soon regrets his decision.

== Cast ==
- Eric Porter as Dr. John Pritchard
- Angharad Rees as Anna
- Jane Merrow as Laura
- Keith Bell as Michael Pritchard
- Derek Godfrey as Mr. Dysart
- Dora Bryan as Mrs. "Granny" Golding
- Marjorie Rhodes as Mrs. Bryant
- Lynda Baron as Long Liz
- Marjie Lawrence as Dolly, the maid
- Margaret Rawlings as Madame Bullard
- Elizabeth MacLennan as Mrs. Wilson
- Barry Lowe as Mr. Wilson
- April Wilding as Catherine
- Douglas Chippendale as Jack the Ripper

== Production ==
It was filmed at Pinewood Studios, with some location work at St. Paul's Cathedral, London. The film was financed by the Rank Organisation.

== Critical reception ==
The Monthly Film Bulletin wrote: "Disappointingly routine Hammer offering, with the usual virtues of good performances and period authenticity, but all the faults as well – a weakly developed plot, rhubarbing extras, and a basic appeal to sadism rather than imagination in the horror sequences. ... Peter Sasdy does his best with the traumas (flickering light on Anna's face, slow zoom-in intercut with flash shots from the early murder scene), but the bloodlust turns into a parade of picturesque variations on the theme of impalement (poker, hat pins, broadsword – even lorgnettes). The traditional Hammer formula – bizarre atrocities erupting in a soberly recreated past – fails here because the rift is too great: the atrocities are not so much bizarre as outlandish, and the period recreation has taken on the stuffed, solemnly expensive look of a BBC costume serial."

The Independent Film Journal wrote: "Above average Hammer film with a far-fetched plot about Jack the Ripper's daughter who's inherited a few of Daddy's peculiarities. What distinguishes the film is an excellent cast led by Eric Porter and, especially, Peter Sasdy's direction. An atmospheric feast for Victorian horror lovers. And, believe it or not, it makes for one of the better Hammer Films in quite some time."

Variety wrote: "Here Hammer breaks away from its vampires and monster formula and gives a highly intriguing twist to the Jack the Ripper murders which shook London back in the 90s and have fascinated writers and filmmakers. Weil-directed by Peter Sasdy, the tension is skillfully developed. Murders are particularly gruesome and there are shocks that will have the most hardened filmgoer sitting up."

Boxoffice wrote: "This Hammer production has the usual virtues of this genre: good performances, fine sets, and period authenticity. ... It follows the traditional Hammer formula: bizarre atrocities erupting in a psychologically recreated past. The final sequence is especially well done. This film will interest general audiences and intrigue horror film buffs.''

Critic Leonard Maltin gave the film 2.5 out of a possible 4 stars. In his review he stated that the film had "[a] good atmosphere and solid performances, but after a good start, dissolves into a series of bloody murders."

The Radio Times Guide to Films gave the film 3/5 stars, writing: "This entertaining piece of nonsense from Hammer is about Jack the Ripper's daughter who, having watched her dad dismember mama, goes barmy whenever she gets kissed in a flickering light. Cue therapist Eric Porter, who tries to cure her but then starts covering up her murders. Porter is too serious for these proceedings, but Angharad Rees is a swell Ms Ripper."

The Hammer Story: The Authorised History of Hammer Films wrote that the film "expertly mixes the sophistication expected of Hammer's films with the gore its new audiences demanded."

Andy Boot considers the film "flawed, and so close to the fag end of Gothic that it could almost be a parody", but that it is "nonetheless a film well worth watching". He opines that Peter Sasdy "atoned for his appalling Countess Dracula [1971] with a much pacier handling of this story."

Film review aggregator Rotten Tomatoes reported an approval rating of 86%, based on seven reviews, with a rating average of 7.1/10.
