= Lorna Doone (1963 TV series) =

1963 British TV drama series

Lorna Doone is a 1963 British TV adaptation of the 1869 romance novel Lorna Doone by R. D. Blackmore. It aired on the BBC and ran for 11 episodes of 30 minutes each.

It starred Bill Travers and Jane Merrow.

== Cast ==
- Bill Travers as John Ridd
- Jean Anderson as Mrs. Ridd
- Andrew Faulds as Carver Doone
- Janet Pate as Lizzie Ridd
- Meg Wynn Owen as Annie Ridd
- Norman Tyrrell as John Fry
- Jane Merrow as Lorna Doone
- John Bennett as Tom Faggus
- Mark Burns as Charlesworth Doone
- Nigel Stock as Jeremy Stickles
- Terence de Marney as Counsellor Doone
- Daphne Heard as Betty Muxworthy
- Brian Hankins as Marwood de Whichelhalse
- Patricia Brake as Gwenny Carfax

== Production ==
In the early 1960s there were rival plans to film Lorna Doone for British TV by the BBC and British Granada. Granada claimed they registered their claim in 1961. Both approached Bill Travers to play the lead.

As of 2021, this was one of only two serialised adaptations made by the BBC (it was remade in 1976 starring Patrick Troughton). However, all 11 episodes of this 1963 version were later wiped by the corporation and are believed to be lost. A single photograph featured on the front cover of a Radio Times issue is all that exists.
