= Joby Blanshard =

English film and television actor (1919–1992)

- Blanshard in Moon Zero Two (1969)
- Born: John Henry Blanshard; 7 November 1919; Beverley, East Riding of Yorkshire, England
- Died: 26 November 1992 (aged 73); Rotherfield, East Sussex, England

John Henry "Joby" Blanshard (7 November 1919 – 26 November 1992) was an English film and television actor, most famous for playing Colin Bradley in 32 episodes of the early 1970s "science-fact" series, Doomwatch.

== Filmography ==
=== Film ===
- The Passing Stranger (1954) - (uncredited)
- Breakout (1959) - Prison officer (uncredited)
- Hell Is a City (1960) - Tawny Jakes
- Crooks Anonymous (1962) - Peekaboo Doorman
- 80,000 Suspects (1963) - Health Inspector Matthews (uncredited)
- West 11 (1963) - Man at Bus Stop (uncredited)
- Moon Zero Two (1969) - Smith
- The Reckoning (1970) - Bottomley
- Doomwatch (1972) - Colin Bradley
- Frenzy (1972) - Man in Crowd (uncredited)
- In the Forest (1978) - Merchant

=== Television ===
Year	Title	Role	Notes
1958	Television Playwright	Amos Hesketh	Episode: "Red Rose for Ransom"
1958	Champion Road	Alf Burton	5 episodes
1963	Moonstrike	Monsieur Brault	2 episodes
1964	Crane	Rahman	Episode: "Man Without a Past"
1964	The Massingham Affair	PC Luke	Episode: "The Lawless Element"
1965	Cluff	PC Arthur Barnoldswick	2 episodes
1966	Quick Before They Catch Us	Bill Judd	2 episodes
1966	Adam Adamant Lives!	Detective	Episode: "A Vintage Year for Scoundrels"
1969	Randall and Hopkirk (Deceased)	Police Inspector	Episode: "But What a Sweet Little Room"
1970-1972	Doomwatch	Colin Bradley	32 episodes
1974	Colditz	Private Brunz	Episode: "Senior American Officer"
1975	Oil Strike North	George Prentice	Episode: "Workhorse"
1976	The Brothers	Van Der Merwe	5 episodes
1977	1990	Williams	Episode: "Voice from the Past"
1977	When the Boat Comes In	Milburn	3 episodes
1978	A Horseman Riding By	Martin Codsall	4 episodes
