= Bearcats! =

American television series (1971)

- Genre: Western
- Created by: Douglas Heyes
- Written by: Jim Byrnes; James L. Henderson; Douglas Heyes; Stephen Kandel; Samuel Roeca; Joe Ruby & Ken Spears
- Directed by: Richard Donner; Lee Madden; Robert Totten; Herb Wallerstein
- Starring: Rod Taylor; Dennis Cole
- Theme music composer: Hal Hopper
- Composer: John Andrew Tartaglia
- Country of origin: United States
- Original language: English
- No. of seasons: 1
- No. of episodes: 13 (+ 1 pilot movie)

Production
- Executive producer: Douglas Heyes
- Producers: Morton Fine; David Friedkin
- Running time: 48 minutes
- Production company: Rodlor

Original release
- Network: CBS
- Release: September 16 – December 30, 1971

Bearcats! is an American Western television series broadcast on the CBS television network during the fall 1971 television season. It starred Rod Taylor and Dennis Cole as troubleshooters in the period before the American entry into World War I (1917).

Bearcats! was produced by Filmways and was co-produced by Rodlor, Rod Taylor's production firm.

== Synopsis ==
Set in 1914, somewhat later historically than a traditional Western, the stories center on the heroes' use of a 1914 Stutz Bearcat automobile. Although automobiles were common in the United States in 1914, a $2,000 sports car was rare in the remote areas of the Western United States. The method by which the heroes paid for this expensive ride was rather unusual. They undertook "private security" jobs for prosperous clients. Rather than charging a set fee, they extracted from the client a blank check that they filled in after completing the job, charging an amount based on the difficulty or danger involved: "If you can put a price on it, you don't need them badly enough."

Typical adventures included learning who was setting fire to oil wells, unraveling a plot where German Imperial Army soldiers dressed as American troops raided Mexican border towns hoping to force Mexico into a war with the United States, and stopping mercenaries from sabotaging medical supplies being sent overseas to the Allies of World War I.

The show's time period allowed the use of props not seen in typical westerns, including airplanes, a World War I-era tank, machine guns, M1911 pistols, and period automobiles.

== Cast ==
- Rod Taylor as Hank Brackett
- Dennis Cole as Johnny Reach

== Production ==
The series was created by veteran TV writer/producer Douglas Heyes who also served as executive producer. He wrote and directed the TV movie Powderkeg that served as the pilot film for the series. Episodes were shot on location in near Tucson, Arizona, and also in and around Santa Fe, New Mexico. Powderkeg was syndicated in the 1970s and frequently aired by local U.S. TV stations, and was the only episode of the series to be released as a VHS videotape.

The series featured a number of well-known guest stars including Leslie Nielsen, Kevin McCarthy, Jane Merrow, Keenan Wynn, Henry Darrow, David Canary, Ed Flanders, Morgan Woodward, John McIntire and Eric Braeden.

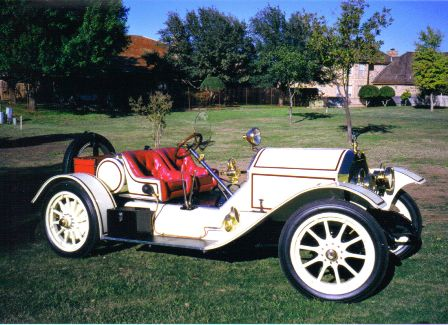
The Bearcat replica used most often in the series, the first built and restored to its TV colors, in 2008.

For filming, the series used two full-scale metal replicas of first generation (1912–1916) Stutz Bearcats made by Hollywood car customizer and film car builder George Barris. While externally very close to the original cars, in fact they were built on custom chassis powered by Ford drivetrains and had modern four wheel brake systems for safety. The two replicas were very similar to one another, however the first built (and the one used for most filming) had a manual 4-speed transmission while the second had an automatic. Additionally, there was a slight variation in the location of the horn bulb and the pinstripes on the sides of the hood of the second car, so the cars can be differentiated while closely viewing the episodes. In addition to the two cars used in the series, Barris built and retained a third car for use at car shows which differed in many details and color from the TV cars. All three cars survive today, though Barris' display car has been extensively modified. The original Stutz Bearcat automobiles had been manufactured in Indianapolis, Indiana; the Stutz factory building still exists but is currently used as an arts and office complex.

The episode "Groundloop at Spanish Wells" features a 1918 Standard J-1 airplane (though it's called a Curtiss Jenny in the script) that had recently been restored in Tucson (where the episode was filmed) by Charles Klessig of Fargo, North Dakota. A later episode featuring the same pilot character, "The Return of Esteban", featured a 1929 British de Havilland DH.60 Moth biplane. According to Klessig, the episode was filmed in New Mexico where the higher altitudes precluded the use of the older aircraft.

The World War I tank shown in the episode "The Devil Wears Armor" is an M1917 (aka Six Ton) tank, an American-built version of the Renault FT. Its gun is not authentic. The M1917 was first ordered in 1917, and the first example was produced in late 1918, four years later than the series' 1914 setting.

The MPC (Model Products Corporation) model company released a 1/25th scale model kit of a Stutz Bearcat as a tie-in with the series. Its box art featured Taylor and Cole in costume with the genuine 1914 Bearcat used in Powderkeg. A photo on the side of the box showed the first Barris replica in a scene from the episode "The Devil Wears Armor".

=== Cancellation ===
Bearcats!, despite a large promotional campaign prior to its premiere and having a loyal fan base, lost in the Nielsen ratings to both The Flip Wilson Show on NBC and a more traditional Western, Alias Smith and Jones, on ABC, and was cancelled midseason.

== Episodes ==
No.	Title	Original release date
Pilot	"Powderkeg"	April 16, 1971
Backdoor pilot: A pair of soldiers of fortune (Hank and Johnny) are hired to get a hijacked train and its 73 passengers freed from a gang of Mexican bandits. Takes place in 1914 along the U.S./Mexico border.: Special Guest Stars are Fernando Lamas, John McIntire, Michael Ansara, Tisha Sterling, Melodie Johnson, Reni Santoni, & Luciana Paluzzi. Others who appeared include William Bryant, Roy Jenson, Jay Novello, James Brown, and John S. Ragin.
1	"The Devil Wears Armor"	September 16, 1971
When villains use a WWI tank to rob a bank, Hank and Johnny disguise as monks to infiltrate the enemy camp, and end up in a Stutz vs. Tank battle.: John Vernon guest stars. Co-stars are Kathleen Lloyd (listed as Kathy Lloyd) as Sister Catalina and Paul Koslo as Billy Ray Joiner. Also appearing are Sherry Bain, Julio Medina, Michael Masters, Evans Thornton, James Nite (billed as Jim Nite), Bonnie Clausing, Bob Hardy, Doug Dudley, & Ron Manning.
2	"Ground Loop at Spanish Wells"	September 23, 1971
Hank and Johnny are hired to discover the motives behind a group of bandits (masquerading as US military troops) raiding small Mexican villages.: Henry Darrow is the guest star in his first appearance as Mexican Army flyer, Raoul Esteban. Also appearing are Lenore Stevens, Tom Simcox, Allen Pinson, Sandy Rosenthal, Peter O'Crotty, Frank Kennedy, Pat Tanno, & Kathleen O'Haco (billed as Kathy O'Haco).
3	"Dos Gringos"	September 30, 1971
Hank is forcibly re-commissioned a US Army Captain to provide aid to a Mexican revolutionary (played by Robert Tafur). He and Johnny must contend with a government-sanctioned assassin (played by Eric Braeden) with orders to capture the revolutionary.: Catherine Ferrar co-stars. Featured actors and actresses are: William Wintersole, Elisabeth Chauvet, Pattie Walczuk, Jack Owens, Charlie Picerni (billed as Charles Picerni), Frank Orsatti, David Cadiente (billed as Dave Cadiente), Hank Calia (billed as Hank Callia), William H. Burton, Sr. (billed as Bill Burton), Phillip Avenetti (billed as Phil Avenetti), & David Herrera.
6	"The Feathered Serpent"	October 7, 1971
Hank and Johnny are hired to stop a group of militants who plan to invade Central America claiming to be Native American liberators but, instead wish to pillage and plunder the area.: Henry Silva guest stars as the leader of the militants. Also guest starring is Katherine Justice. Co-stars are Rex Holman, William Bramley, Woodrow Chambliss, Lenore Kasdorf, Louis Massad (billed as Lou Massad), Link Wyler, Fielding Greaves, and Henry Kendrick (billed as Henry M. Kendrick).
8	"The Hostage"	October 14, 1971
An outlaw (played by David Canary) is out for revenge against a town for trying and hanging his father who killed one of the town's citizens. A young girl from the town (played by Erin Moran) hires Hank and Johnny to stop the ex-con and his gang.: Others appearing are Ed Flanders, Warner Anderson, Sam Edwards, Gary McLarty, Ben Zeller, Don West, Herb Robins, Max Wheeler, Wally Rose, Colleen Ramero, and Jan Szalay.
7	"Conqueror's Gold"	October 28, 1971
A gang of thieves led by Carter Gladstone (played by Kevin McCarthy) want to loot an archaeological site of gold discovered there by a native Mexican priest (played by Tom Nardini). The gang captures the priest and the group of 50 that is helping him excavate the ruins. A newspaper reporter (played by Jane Merrow) covering the dig escapes as the thieves enter the ruins. The reporter gets her newspaper to hire Hank and Johnny to stop the thieves and rescue the archaeological group.: Co-stars are Rod Cameron and Pepper Martin. Also appearing are Victor Eberg, Gregory Enton, Gary Cassell, Sue Ann Carpenter, Hersha Parady (billed as Hershey Parody), and Fred M. Waugh (billed as Fred Waugh).
9	"Blood Knot"	November 4, 1971
Racial tension runs high in a small town between the white and Native American residents after oil drilling rigs are destroyed, and people are injured and killed by arrows. Hank and Johnny are hired to bring the perpetrators to justice and defuse the tension.: Guest stars are H.M. Wynant and Leslie Parrish. Featured stars are C. Lindsay Workman (billed as Lindsay Workman), X Brands, Robert Hoy (billed as Bob Hoy), Jose Russler, and Laura A. Campbell (billed as Laura Campbell).
11	"Assault on San Saba"	November 11, 1971
A group of German spies captures a prison in an attempt to get prisoners to perform acts of sabotage and murder against targets in the United States. Hank and Johnny must break into the prison to stop the plan from being carried out.: Guest stars are Bruce Glover and Lincoln Kilpatrick. Co-stars are Edward Faulkner and Barry Hamilton. Featured actors and actresses are Maree Cheatham (billed as "Marie Cheatham"), Richard Webb, Rob Townsend (born Ronald Gordon Townson), Ed Call, Mark Allen, Ann Bell, & George Sawaya.
4	"Bitter Flats"	November 18, 1971
A wealthy rancher (played by Keenan Wynn) is mining Tungsten, and sending it over the border to Mexico. Two U.S. soldiers infiltrate the ranch as drovers to investigate. One soldier is killed after discovering the operation, and the other is captured. The parents of the captured soldier get Hank and Johnny to rescue their son, and bring the rancher to justice.: Katherine Cannon (billed as Kathy Cannon) also guest stars with Wynn. Rockne Tarkington and Charles Dierkop (billed as Charlie Dierkop) are co-stars. Jim Boles, Doreen Lang, & Jason Ledger are the featured actors and actress. Also appearing are Craig R. Baxley (billed as Craig Baxley), Joanna Serpe (billed as Joana Serpe), Katherine Darc, Don Rizzan, Grady T. Hill, Jr., Don Kayne, & John Gill.
10	"Tiger, Tiger"	November 25, 1971
A group of saboteurs led by Walker "Tiger" Thompson (played by Morgan Woodward) have destroyed 8 shipments of medical supplies that were destined for America's allies during WWI. Hank and Johnny are hired to stop the saboteurs.: Walter Brooke, Betty Anne Rees, Judith Brown (billed as Judy Brown), & Lawrence Montaigne are co-stars. Houston Savage (billed as Gene De Blasio), Byron Morrow, Victor Mohica (billed as Vic Mohica), Kathy Silva, Bob Herron, & Ted Grossman are the featured actors and actress.
5	"The Big Guns"	December 2, 1971
A group of U.S. Army deserters led by Colonel Ted Donovan (played by Leslie Nielsen) aim to gain revenge against the Army by destroying a convoy using 2 stolen artillery guns. Hank and Johnny are hired by the U.S. Government to stop them.: Morgan Paull also guest stars. Co-stars are George Murdock, Stacy Harris, Philip Kenneally, Arthur Batanides, & Peter Hellman.
12	"The Return of Estaban"	December 23, 1971
An ex-con (played by William Smith) who spent 20 years in prison for killing his brother is out for revenge against the town where he was tried and convicted. Hank and Johnny are hired to stop him and his band of men. But, they need help from their friend Raoul Estaban (Henry Darrow). Curiously, the spelling of Darrow's character's last name is now spelled "Estaban" instead of "Esteban" as it was in the episode, "Ground Loop at Spanish Wells.": Guest starring along with Darrow is Kathryn Hays. Co-stars are Xenia Gratsos (billed under her stage name of Brioni Farrell) and Richard Anders. Louis Elias is uncredited as boxer James J. Jeffries.
13	"Man in a Cage"	December 30, 1971
An outlaw (played by Jeremy Slate) and his gang kidnaps a judge (played by John Anderson), who is also a gubernatorial candidate, and holds him hostage for the ransom of U.S. Army guns and ammunition. Hank and Johnny are hired by the judge's wife (played by Doris Dowling) and the U.S. Government to free the judge. However, Hank and Johnny must rely on an imprisoned member (played by Luke Askew) of the outlaw's gang to help them.: John Quade co-stars.

== Broadcasts ==
The series was shown extensively overseas, including Germany, Ireland, Spain, the United Kingdom, and Australia. Its pilot film, Powderkeg, was released as a theatrical feature overseas.

== Home media ==
On May 14, 2013, Timeless Media Group released Bearcats! – The Complete Series in a three-DVD set in Region 1. The 90-minute pilot episode "Powderkeg" is not included, but was released as a standalone DVD or as part of the "20 Great Westerns: Heroes and Bandits" DVD box set produced by TGG Direct. It was released on DVD by Maritim Pictures in Germany as Pulverfass, with original English and German-dubbed soundtracks.

== Original novel based on the series ==
When the series was announced, paperback publisher Award Books licensed book rights to Bearcats! and commissioned an original novel by veteran Western novelist W.T. Ballard, to be published in 1971, under his tie-in pseudonym "Brian Fox" (a by-line he had employed often when working for Award). But when the TV series was canceled before the book could be made ready for distribution, the book was canceled in turn. Ballard, apparently unwilling to let the novel go unpublished, retitled it, slapped on another of his pseudonyms, and, without so much as changing the names of its heroes, sold the book again to unsuspecting publisher Ballantine Books—who released it in December 1972 under the title Hell Hole as by "John Hunter." The connection was not discovered during Ballard's lifetime.
