= Jane Merrow =

British actress (born 1941)

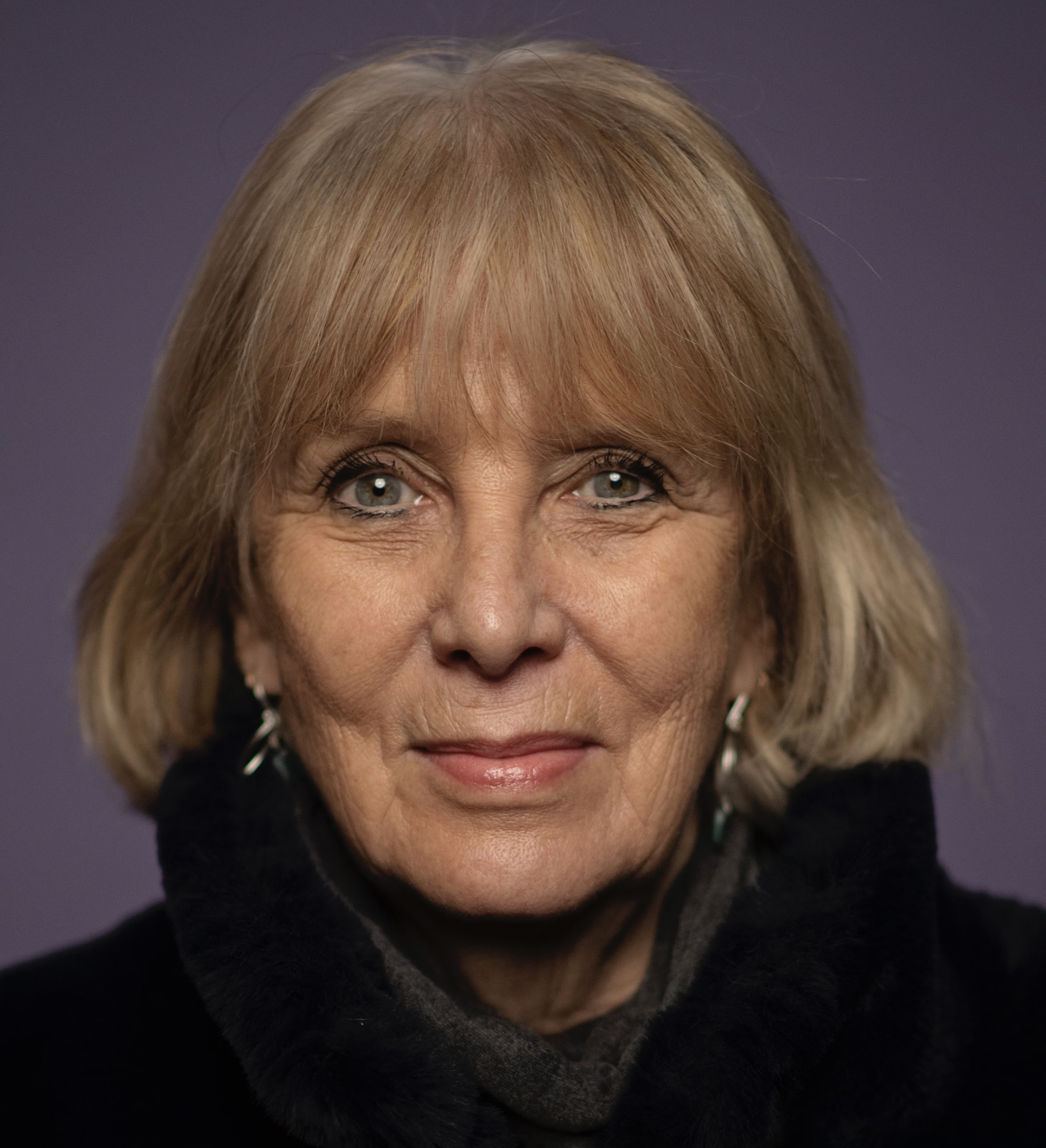
- Merrow in 2020
- Born: Jane Josephine Meirowsky; 26 August 1941 (age 85); Hertfordshire, England
- Education: Royal Academy of Dramatic Art
- Occupation: Actress
- Years active: 1960–present
- Website: https://janemerrow.com

Jane Josephine Meirowsky (born 26 August 1941), known professionally as Jane Merrow, is an English actress who has been active from the 1960s in both Britain and the United States.

== Early years ==
Merrow was born in 1941 in Hertfordshire to an English mother and German-Jewish refugee father. "My father’s side of the family were ethnically Jewish, but not practising," she would later state. She is a graduate of the Royal Academy of Dramatic Art. She also was active in the British National Youth Theatre and won the Shakespeare Cup at the Kent Drama Festival.

== Film and television career ==
In 1963, Merrow was cast in the lead role of a BBC adaptation of Lorna Doone and subsequently had roles in British ITC TV series such as Danger Man, The Saint, The Baron, The Prisoner (in the 1967 episode "The Schizoid Man" as Alison, a mind reader), Gerry Anderson's UFO, and The Avengers where, having appeared in the penultimate episode of the 1967 series ("Mission ... Highly Improbable"), she was considered as the replacement for a departing Diana Rigg. The role went to Linda Thorson instead.

She also appeared as Lollo Romano in the 1965 "Gang War" episode of Gideon's Way. She featured in a new version of the Nigel Kneale adaptation of Nineteen Eighty-Four (1965) which was broadcast in the Theatre 625 series. David Buck was Winston Smith with Merrow as his lover, Julia.

In 1966 she appeared in The Saint (series 5, episode 7: "The Angel's Eye") as Mabel, the unwilling partner of her father's bid to steal a famous diamond: The Angel's Eye.

Merrow starred in the British science fiction film Night of the Big Heat (1967) with Peter Cushing and Christopher Lee, prior to her role as Alais, the mistress of Henry II (played by Peter O'Toole) in The Lion in Winter (1968), for which she received a 1969 Golden Globe nomination in the category of actress in a supporting role, losing to Ruth Gordon who won for Rosemary's Baby. She appeared in Adam's Woman with Beau Bridges in 1970. She also appeared as the blind Laura in the Hammer film Hands of the Ripper (1971). She appeared in an episode ("Who Killed Cock Robin?", 1969) of Randall and Hopkirk (Deceased). In 1971, she played Anne Hepton in Hadleigh, becoming the romantic interest of the lead character.

Around this time, she moved to the U.S., where she guest-starred on television in dramas, mysteries and adventure programmes, including Mission: Impossible; Bearcats!; Mannix; Emergency!; Police Woman; The Six Million Dollar Man; Cannon; Barnaby Jones; The Eddie Capra Mysteries; Airwolf; MacGyver; Hart to Hart; Magnum, P.I.; The Incredible Hulk; Once an Eagle; The Greatest American Hero; and The Magician.

== Later life ==
In the 1990s, Merrow returned to Britain to run a family business. In 2006, she took part in a Prisoner-related event in Portmeirion, North Wales, and in 2008, she was a guest there for the annual convention for The Prisoner TV series organised by the Prisoner Appreciation Society.

The summer of 2009 saw Merrow return to the stage, playing Emilia in Shakespeare's play The Comedy of Errors with the Idaho Shakespeare Company.

== Filmography ==
=== Film ===
Year	Title	Role	Notes
1961	Don't Bother to Knock	Girl in Gallery	Uncredited
1962	The Phantom of the Opera	Chorus Girl	Uncredited
1962	The Wild and the Willing	Mary Parker	
1964	The System	Nicola	USA: The Girl-Getters
1965	Catacombs	Alice Taylor	
1967	Night of the Big Heat	Angela Roberts	
1968	Assignment K	Martine	
1968	The Lion in Winter	Alais	
1970	Adam's Woman	Bess	
1971	Hands of the Ripper	Laura	
1974	A Time for Love	Janice	
1975	Diagnosis: Murder	Mary Dawson	
1981	The Appointment	Dianna	
2008	Blinded	Jill	
2010	Be Careful of What You Wish For	Mrs. White	
2016	Almosting It	Gladys	
2020	The Haunting of Margam Castle	Edith Withers	
2025	In the Grip of Terorr	Matron Margaret	
2026	Andy	Anne Malone	

=== Television ===
Year	Title	Role	Notes
1961	The Angry Gods	Perdita	2 episodes
1961	Deadline Midnight	Dilys Jones	Episode: "An Eye for Detail"
1962	Oliver Twist	Oliver's Mother	Episode: #1.1
1962	Compact	Anna	Episode: "Pets Corner"
1962	This Time Next Year	Joyce	TV film
1962	Man of the World	Nurse	Episode: "Blaze of Glory"
1962	BBC Sunday-Night Play	Jean Skelton	Episode: "A Suitable Case for Treatment"
1962	Harpers West One	Ruth Leigh	Episode: #2.11
1962	Call Oxbridge 2000	Joan Price	Episode: #2.12
1963	Moonstrike	Vicky	Episode: "Message Received"
1963	The Birth of a Private Man	Frances Waring	TV film
1963	The Plane Makers	Sue Collins	Episode: "Point of Contact"
1963	About Religion	Girl	Episode: "The Night Before the Execution"
1963	24-Hour Call	Moira Singleton	Episode: "The Confession"
1963	Jane Eyre	Rosamund Oliver	Episode: #1.5
1963	The Human Jungle	Penny Branch	Episode: "Fine Feathers"
1963	Corrigan Blake	Mary	Episode: "Love Bird"
1963	Lorna Doone	Lorna Doone	Title role, nine episodes
1963	Festival	Susan	Episode: "I Want To Go Home"
1964	Festival	Giselle	Episode: "Justin Thyme"
1964	Love Story	Jane Cleveland	Episode: "The End of the Line"
1964	Detective	Eve Gill	Episode: "The Hungry Spider"
1964-5	Danger Man	Various	3 episodes
1965	Gideon's Way	Lollo Romano	Episode: "Gang War"
1965	Story Parade	Erika Hacker	Episode: "The World That Summer"
1965	Theatre 625	Julia	Episode: "The World of George Orwell: 1984"
1965-66	The Saint	Lois Norroy/Mabel	2 episodes
1966	The Baron	Savannah Olmira	Episode: "Red Horse, Red Rider"
1966	Mystery and Imagination	Carmilla	Episode: "Carmilla"
1967	The Prisoner	Alison	Episode: "The Schizoid Man"
1967	The Avengers	Susan Rushton	Episode: "Mission: Highly Improbable"
1967	Man in a Suitcase	Susan Fenchurch	Episode: "The Bridge"
1968	BBC Play of the Month	Sorel Bliss	Episode: "Hay Fever"
1969	Strange Report	Jill Crowley	Episode: "REPORT 1553 RACIST 'A most dangerous proposal'"
1969	Randall and Hopkirk (Deceased)	Sandra Joyce	Episode: "Who Killed Cock Robin?"
1970	Mission: Impossible	Lady Cora Weston	Episode: "Lover's Knot"
1971	UFO	Jo Fraser	Episode: "The Responsibility Seat"
1971	Hadleigh	Anne Hepton	Eight episodes in season 2
1971	Bearcats!	Samantha Burke	Episode: "Conquerer's Gold"
1971	Alias Smith and Jones	Sister Isabel	Episode: "The Reformation of Harry Briscoe"
1972	Mannix	Clarissa Colburn	Episode: "The Sound of Murder"
1972	Love, American Style	Miranda/Jeannie Zambini	Episode: "Love and the Happy Medium/Love and the Jinx/Love and the Little Black Book/Love and the Old Swingers" (segment "Love and the Happy Medium")
1972	The Hound of the Baskervilles	Beryl Stapleton	TV film
1973	The Horror at 37,000 Feet	Sheryl O'Neil	TV film
1973	Mannix	Leona Kellaway	Episode: "Carol Lockwood, Past Tense"
1973	Emergency!	Lady Rossman	Episode: "The Professor"
1973	Love, American Style	Pamela	Episode: "Love and the Golden Memory/Love and the Heavy Set/Love and the Novel/Love and the See-Through Mind/Love and the Seven Year Wait" (segment "Love and the Golden Memory")
1973	The Magician	Carol Spain / Lorna Hackett	Episode: "Man on Fire"
1973	Cannon	Gretchen Calloway	Episode: "Murder by the Numbers"
1974	Police Woman	Linda	Episode: "Requien for Bored Wives"
1974	Barnaby Jones	Hillary Padgett	Episode: "Web of Deceit"
1974	The Six Million Dollar Man	Irina Leonova	Episode: "Doomsday, and Counting"
1977	Once an Eagle	Hallie Burns	Episode 7
1977	The Six Million Dollar Man	Irina Leonova	Episodes: "Death Probe, Parts 1 and 2"
1977	Van der Valk	Diane	Episode: "Diane"
1978	The Eddie Capra Mysteries	Unknown	Episode: "Murder Plays a Dead Hand"
1981	The Incredible Hulk	Dr Jane Cabot	Episode: "Bring Me the Head of the Hulk"
1981	The Greatest American Hero	Betty	Episode: "The Beast in the Black"
1982	Romance Theatre	Magda	Episodes: "Escape to Love, Parts 1 - 5"
1982	Hart to Hart	Margaret Chumley	Episode: "Rich and Hartless"
1983	Magnum, P.I.	Vivien Brock Jones, Lady Wilkerson, Duchess of Whitt	Episode: "Letter to a Duchess"
1984	Rituals	Harriet Winslow	Episode: "Unaired pilot"
1985	St. Elsewhere	Landlady	Episode: "Tears of a Clown'
1985	Days of Our Lives	Mrs. Pierpoint	Episode: "#1.5121"
1986	Airwolf	Mrs Eleanor Haines	Episode: "Break-In at Santa Paula"
1986	MacGyver	Dr Natalia Petrovitsh	Episode: "A Prisoner of Conscience"
1993	Lovejoy	Stella	Episode: "Taking the Pledge"
1996	Accused	Janet Walsh	Three Episodes: "Carol", "Kirkpatrick", "Mukesh"
1997	Sharpe	Duchess of Richmond	Episode: "Sharpe's Waterloo"
