= Michael Coles (actor) =

English actor (1936–2005)

- in Randall and Hopkirk (Deceased) ep.: For the Girl Who Has Everything (1969)
- Born: Ernest Michael Coles; 12 August 1934; Willesden, London, England
- Died: 26 April 2005 (aged 70); Chelsea, London, England
- Occupation: Actor
- Spouse: Maryon Kantaroff (m. 1962; div. 1966)

Ernest Michael Coles (12 August 1934 – 26 April 2005) was an English actor. He appeared in a number of British television series and films during the 1960s and 1970s including No Hiding Place, Dr. Who and the Daleks, The Troubleshooters, The Saint, The Baron, The Avengers, Department S and Z-Cars. His other film roles included Inspector Murray in Dracula A.D. 1972 (1972) and The Satanic Rites of Dracula (1973), three of the Edgar Wallace films of the early sixties (Man Detained, Solo for Sparrow and Never Mention Murder), as well as the film version of The Sweeney (1977).

== Filmography ==
Title	Year	Role	Notes
BBC Sunday-Night Play	1960	Terry Malone	"The Ruffians"
ITV Television Playhouse	1961	Journalist	"The Bad One"
Edgar Wallace Mysteries	1961-1964	Frank Murray / Pin Norman / Tony Sorbo	"Man Detained" / "Solo for Sparrow" / "Never Mention Murder"
Armchair Theatre	1961-1972	Fred / Ginge / Dick	"No Licence for Singing" / "Always Something Hot" /"On Call"
H.M.S. Defiant	1962	Flag Lieutenant	Film
Private Potter	1962	Pvt. Robertson	Film
ITV Play of the Week	1962-1967	Charles the Dauphin / Lance Corporal Cooke / Jack Henley / Cpl. Bull / Armidal / Det. Sgt. Joe Brandon	"The Lark" / "Jacko at War" / "Giants on Saturday" / "The Cretan" / "The Crossfire" / "Person Unknown"
The Plane Makers	1963	Johnny	"The Silent and the Damned"
Ghost Squad	1963	Max	"Hot Money"
Maupassant	1963	Jacques	"The Story of a Farm Girl"
First Night	1963	Dave	"The Strain"
The Informers	1963	Ben	Film
Love Story	1963-1964	Tomo / Charles	"The Wedding of Smith Seven-Nine" / "The Emotional Machine"
No Hiding Place	1963-1966	Det. Sgt. Tim Benson / Frankie Archer	"Statement to the Press" / "The Lifer"
Drama 61-67	1964	Stage Manager	"Studio '64: The Close Prisoner"
Story Parade	1964	Charlie	"Brake Pedal Down"
Never Mention Murder	1965	Tony Sorbo	
Dr. Who and the Daleks	1965	Ganatus	Film
The Likely Lads	1965	Big Duggy	"Talk of the Town"
The Wednesday Play	1966	Anthony Charles Goodwin	"The Portsmouth Defence"
The Troubleshooters	1966	Tiger	"Is That Tiger, Man"
The Cretan Plays of Action	1966	Corporal Bull	TV movie
ABC Stage 67	1966	Injured man	"Dare I Weep, Dare I Mourn?"
The Saint	1966	Hugo	"The Better Mousetrap"
The Avengers	1967	Verret	"The Bird Who Knew Too Much"
The Baron	1967	Vince Florio	"The Man Outside"
Mickey Dunne	1967	Little Chick	"Big Fleas, Little Fleas"
Boy Meets Girl	1967	Jack Spade	"The Young Visitors"
ITV Playhouse	1967-1970	Frank Mowbray / Det. Supt. Jagger / Sam Hunter	"They Said 'Let's Live Together'" / "Suspect" / "Rumour"
Virgin of the Secret Service	1968	Prince Rouvaloff	"Russian Roundabout"
Thirty-Minute Theatre	1969	A Guest	"Invasion"
Fraud Squad	1969	Brother Simple	"Brother Simple"
A Touch of Love	1969	Joe Hurt	Film
Plays of Today	1969	Bacca Lank	"Men of Iron"
Randall and Hopkirk (Deceased)	1969	Larry Wentworth	"For the Girl Who Has Everything"
Happy Ever After	1970	George Harcourt	"What's the Matter Can't You Sleep?"
Department S	1970	Rupert Fallon	"The Soup of the Day"
Z-Cars	1970	Mike Fletcher	2 episodes: "The Senior Partner"
Play for Today	1970	Simon Hallam	"A Distant Thunder"
Hine	1971	Martin	"Caviare and Chips"
Trial	1971	Jarratt	2 episodes
Justice	1971-1974	Det. Sgt. Gable / Tindall	"The Rain It Raineth" / "Within a Year and a Day" / "Growing Up"
I Want What I Want	1972	Frank	Film
Dracula A.D. 1972	1972	Inspector Murray	Film
Pathfinders	1972	Flight Lieutenant Andrew Cross	"Fly There, Walk Back"
ITV Sunday Night Theatre	1973	Ron	"Pleased to Meet You"
Six Days of Justice	1973	Mr. Fisher	"Black Spot"
The Satanic Rites of Dracula	1973	Inspector Murray	Film
The Protectors	1974	Sandom	"Route 27"
Flame	1975	Roy Priest	Film
The Hanged Man	1975	Hans Ericksen	"Knave of Coins"
The Sweeney	1975	Maynard	"I Want the Man"
Murder	1976	John Lovel	"Hello Lola"
Spring and Autumn	1976	Dave	1 episode
Sweeney!	1977	Johnson	Film
Horse in the House	1977	Mr. Webb	4 episodes
The Professionals	1980	Rio	"Mixed Doubles"
99-1	1994	Glass	"Where the Money Is"
Pie in the Sky	1994	Vince Palmer	"Once a Copper"
Dalziel and Pascoe	1996	Papworth	"An Autumn Shroud", (final appearance)
