= Mitzi's Abortion =

Play by Elizabeth Heffron

- Written by: Elizabeth Heffron

Mitzi's Abortion is a play by a Seattle-based playwright, Elizabeth Heffron. The play dramatizes the journey of a young woman who is advised by her doctor to have a late-term abortion due to anencephaly, a severe birth defect, in her child. The social and cultural conflicts that arise as a result of her and her doctor's decision serve as the basis for the play. The play originally ran at the ACT Theatre in Seattle in the summer of 2006.

== Information ==
Mitzi's Abortion had five performances that ended July 25, 2012. The shows were at Warehouse, 645 New York Ave NW, Washington, DC.

Elizabeth Heffron was inspired to create this play after reading an article that was published in 2002. It was written by P-I columnist, Susan Paynter. The article described the story of a Navy wife who was 19. She was carrying a baby that had no cranium or brain. She found out that the military insurer that she had called Tricare Management Activity would not be able to cover the procedure required to terminate the pregnancy.

== Characters ==
The characters of Mitzi's Abortion are as follows:

- Mitzi is played by Natalie Cutcher
- Aquinas is played by John C. Bailey
- Nita is played by Amy Couchoud
- Tim is played by John C. Bailey
- Mary is played by Louise Schlegel
