= For the Girl Who Has Everything (Randall and Hopkirk (Deceased)) =

"For the Girl Who Has Everything"
- Randall and Hopkirk (Deceased) episode
- Episode no.: Season 1 Episode 12
- Directed by: Cyril Frankel
- Written by: Donald James
- Production code: 12
- Original air date: 6 December 1969

Guest appearances
- Lois Maxwell; Marjorie Rhodes; Freddie Jones; Michael Coles

Episode chronology
← Previous "The Ghost who Saved the Bank at Monte Carlo"	Next → "But What a Sweet Little Room"

"For the Girl who Has Everything" is the twelfth episode of the 1969 ITC British television series Randall and Hopkirk (Deceased) starring Mike Pratt, Kenneth Cope and Annette Andre. The episode was first broadcast on 6 December 1969 on ITV. Directed by Cyril Frankel, it featured Lois Maxwell.

== Synopsis ==
Kim Wentworth (Lois Maxwell) who has too much money, and too many husbands, plots to kill husband seven for artistic straying, with a cover of a haunting - being investigated by ghost hunter James McAlliser (Freddie Jones) for a fee of £1500 (1969 - £25,000 2020). Apparently, dodgy McAlliser is quite the reverse, calling on Randall and Hopkirk when he cannot detect a ghost, and generously shares his fee with Randall for a week's work. Randall is left to sort out the true killer of McAllister, husband number 7 and becoming murder victim no 3 of the episode. A nice aside is the introduction of Mrs Pleasance (Marjorie Rhodes), a modest born clairvoyant for far too short a time, whose storyline intersects with the murders for humour and resolution.

== Cast ==
- Mike Pratt as Jeff Randall
- Kenneth Cope as Marty Hopkirk
- Annette Andre as Jeannie Hopkirk
- Lois Maxwell as Kim Wentworth
- Marjorie Rhodes as Mrs. Pleasance
- Freddie Jones as James McAllister
- Michael Coles as Larry Wentworth
- Paul Bertoya as Jean-Claude
- Carol Cleveland as Laura Slade
- Eric Dodson as Vicar
- Carol Dilworth as Girl with Dog
- George Lee as Police Sergeant
- Basil Clarke as Coroner

== Production ==
The exterior to Kim Wentworth's home was shot at Hilfield Castle in Aldenham, Hertfordshire. The village scenes and tea shop exterior were shot at The Buttery on Village Road in Denham, Buckinghamshire. Laura Slade's cottage was shot on Slade Oak Lane, also in Denham. The episode was actually the third episode to be shot, shot in June–July 1968.

The following is an extract from Dennis Spooner's actual script outline for the scene and aftermath in which Marty discovers somebody other than Randall who can see him:

"Hopkirk is walking down Chelsea High Street battling his brains on how he can contact Randall again and give out a further clue he has acquired.

Hopkirk is always dressed in ghostly garb. A normal outfit of clothes, but every article a plain shade of pale green.

So deep is Hopkirk in thought that when an elderly, eccentric looking lady - very much of the living - says "Good morning" as he passes her, he has gone some yards before he realises the significance.

Hopkirk dashes back. "You can see me - and I'm a ghost!"

The lady nods. It appears she always has been somewhat psychic. Hopkirk's joy knows no bounds. At last an end to all his problems. He succeeds in persuading the lady to telephone Randall, and to pass on the information.

Later in the office, Hopkirk is explaining to Randall (not that he can actually hear a word) that everything from now on will be plain sailing. Randall will get the cases, Hopkirk will find the clues and pass the information on through his new good friend.

Then - horrors - through the wall comes the lady - totally dressed in a pale green ghostly outfit. It transpires that she has called to say goodbye... she always meant to get those steps in the kitchen fixed, but, alas, too late..."

Freddie Jones' stand-in is seen riding a 1963 Triumph Tiger Cub in the opening seconds of the episode.
