= Red Noses =

Play written by Peter Barnes

- Written by: Peter Barnes
- Characters: Father Flote; Father Toulon; Master Bells; Brodin; Marguerite; Rochfort; Frapper; Pope Clement VI bigod
- Original language: English
- Subject: The Black Death, a Pope and a band of red nosed comics
- Genre: Comedy
- Setting: 14th-century France

Premiere
- Date premiered: 1985
- Place premiered: Barbican Theatre, London

Red Noses is a comedy about the black death by Peter Barnes, first staged at Barbican Theatre in 1985. It depicted a sprightly priest, originally played by Antony Sher, who travelled around the plague-affected villages of 14th century France with a band of fools, known as Floties, offering holy assistance. It was for this play that Barnes won his Olivier award.

== Awards and nominations ==
=== Awards ===
- 1985 Laurence Olivier Award for Best New Play

== Original cast ==
- Alain Boutros - David Whitaker
- Archbishop Monselet - Raymond Bowers
- Attendant, Leper - Phillip Dupuy
- Bonville, Lefranc - Norman Henry
- Brodin - Pete Postlethwaite
- Camille - Rowena Roberts
- Charles Bembo - Derek Crewe
- Dr Antrechau, Patris - Peter Theedom
- Druce - Jimmy Yuill
- Evaline, First Leper - Sarah Woodward
- First Flagellant - Steve Swinscoe
- Frapper - Nicholas Woodeson
- Grez - Nicholas Farrell
- Jean le Grue - Bernard Horsfall
- Marcel Flote - Antony Sher
- Marguerite - Polly James
- Marie - Katharine Rogers
- Mistral, Bigod - Nicholas Bell
- Mme de Vonville - Yvonne Coulette
- Moncriff, Jacques B - Charles Millham
- Mother Metz - Yvonne Coulette
- Pellico - Don McKillop
- Pope Clement VI - Christopher Benjamin
- Rochfort - Richard Easton
- Sabine - Cathy Tyson
- Scarron - Brian Parr
- Second Flagellant - Philip Barnes
- Sonnerie - Jim Hooper
- Third Flagellant - Tony London
- Toulon - Peter Eyre
- Viennet, Vosques - James Newall
