= The Ruling Class (play) =

1968 play by Peter Barnes

- Original language: English
- Written by: Peter Barnes
- Characters: Jack Arnold Alexander Tancred; Daniel Tucker; Sir Charles Gurney; Lady Claire Gurney; Grace Shelley; Dr. Paul Herder; McKyle; Kelso Truscott, Q. C. Detective Inspector Brockett; Detective Sergeant Fraser
- Subject: insanity, social class in the United Kingdom
- Setting: An English country house, the 1960s

Premiere
- Date: 6 November 1968
- Place: Nottingham Playhouse, Nottingham

The Ruling Class is a 1968 British play by Peter Barnes. The black comedy centres on Jack Arnold Alexander Tancred Gurney, the 14th Earl of Gurney and the attempts to cure him of insanity.

Peter O'Toole acquired the film rights and starred in the 1972 film adaptation.

== Plot ==
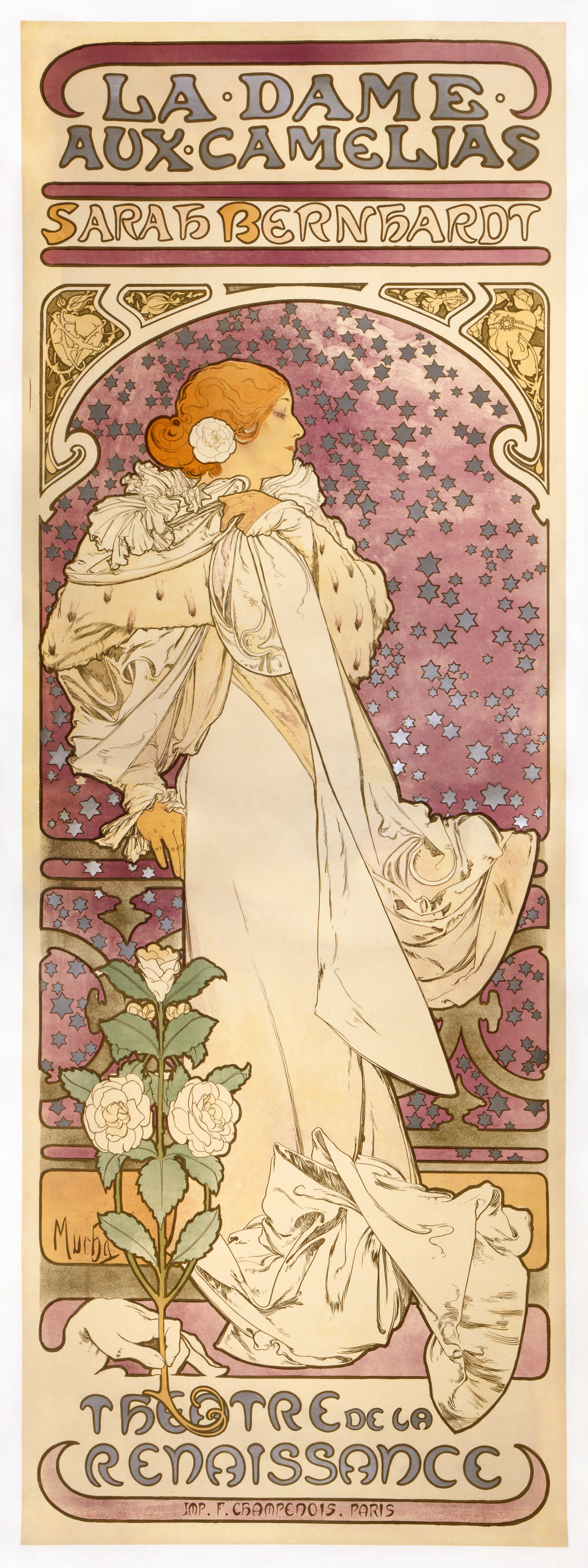
Poster depicting the Lady of the Camellias, Lord Gurney's imagined wife.

After a speech at a dinner proposing a toast to England, the 13th Earl of Gurney is got ready for bed by his butler Tucker. This includes setting up a silken noose above his four-poster, which the Earl uses for a bizarre autoerotic asphyxiation ritual. He survives this the first time, but it goes wrong the second time he tries it and kills him.

His half-brother Sir Charles, Charles' wife Lady Claire and their son Dinsdale gather to hear the reading of the 13th Earl's will. Three of the Earl's sons have already died overseas in the British Empire and the one survivor, Jack, is in a mental institution and thought to be unable to be present. He has been diagnosed as a paranoid schizophrenic prone to delusions of grandeur, caused or worsened by his time at boarding school, where he felt abandoned and victimized. As a subconscious defence against such abandonment, he developed a delusion that he was Jesus Christ returned to bring and embody love, so that people would have to love him in order to find peace and salvation.

The reading goes ahead - besides £30,000 left to Tucker and other bequests to eccentric charities, the relations are shocked to hear that the 13th Earl has left his title and estates not to Charles but to Jack, making him the 14th Earl. Jack arrives and asks for a moment of prayer, which actually turns into a conversation with himself, still thinking he is Jesus and God. Charles finds a loophole, that Jack can be sent back to the insane asylum so soon as he has married and begotten a sane heir to succeed him. However, Jack states he is already married, to La Dame aux Camélias, who he insists is a real person not a fictional character.

Charles has his long-time mistress Grace Shelly arrive in disguise as 'La Dame' and Jack agrees to her request for a 'second' wedding. This goes ahead, but Grace falls in love with Jack and becomes his ally. She also conceives a child by him, despite him spending their wedding night on a unicycle. Lady Claire also proves obstructive and begins an affair with Jack's psychiatrist Herder to try to persuade him to cure Gurney more quickly. Herder attempts to achieve this through intensive psychotherapy then - when this fails - resorts to shock therapy on the night that Grace goes into labour. This consists of bringing in another patient who also believed himself to be Christ, or, as the patient put it, "the God of electricity". Rather than drawing Jack to the conclusion that they cannot both be Christ, it causes him an apparent breakdown and he seemingly returns to his true identity as Jack Gurney.

Sir Charles, still intent on stealing the lordship, sends for a court psychiatrist to evaluate Gurney, confident that his nephew would be sent to an asylum for life. However, Jack puts up a front and plays on the psychiatrist being a fellow Etonian, getting himself declared sane. Jack also reveals to the audience that he has not been cured but instead switched to believing he is both the Old Testament God of vengeance and Jack the Ripper. Now a violent psychopath with a puritanical hatred of women, Gurney murders Sir Charles' wife in a fit of enraged revulsion when she tries to seduce him and frames Tucker (still working for the family) for the crime. Jack then assumes his place in the House of Lords with a fiery speech in favour of capital and corporal punishment. That night, Grace admits her love for him and he murders her for it.

== Production history ==
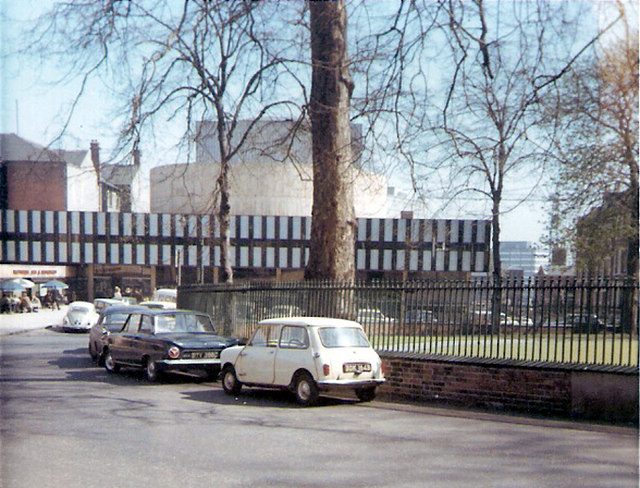
The Nottingham Playhouse, pictured in 1967.

The play premiered at the Nottingham Playhouse in 1968, transferring to the Piccadilly Theatre in the West End the following year, with the lead role played, as at Nottingham, by Derek Godfrey. It shared the John Whiting Award with Narrow Road to the Deep North in 1968 and received the Charles Wintour Award for Most Promising Playwright at the 1969 Evening Standard Awards. Peter O'Toole acquired the film rights and starred in the 1972 film adaptation. The play was revived at the Leeds Playhouse in 1983 (directed by Nicholas Hytner) and at the Trafalgar Studios in 2015 (directed by Jamie Lloyd, with the lead role taken by James McAvoy). McAvoy was honoured with the Best Actor award at the 2015 Evening Standard Theatre Awards for his performance.
