= Peter Barnes (playwright) =

English playwright and screenwriter (1931–2004)

Photo of Barnes by Denis Thorpe

Peter Barnes (10 January 1931 – 1 July 2004) was an English Olivier Award-winning playwright and screenwriter. His best known work is the play The Ruling Class, which was made into a 1972 film for which Peter O'Toole received an Oscar nomination.

== Biography ==
=== Early career ===
Barnes was educated at Marling School in Stroud, Gloucestershire and performed his national service with the Royal Air Force. He then worked briefly for London County Council.

Bored with his job, Barnes took a correspondence course in theology and began to visit the British Museum Reading Room, which he used as an office on a daily basis. During this period he worked as a film critic, story editor, and a screenwriter. He achieved critical and box-office success with his baroque comedy The Ruling Class (1968), which debuted at the Nottingham Playhouse. The play was notorious for its anti-naturalistic approach, unusual in theatre at the time. Critic Harold Hobson deemed it to be one of the best first plays of its generation. Following a successful three-month run in the West End, Barnes adapted the play for the 1972 film of the same name, which featured a highly acclaimed performance by Peter O'Toole.

=== Later plays ===
Following his initial success, Barnes wrote a series of plays offering apocalyptic visions of various periods in history:

- Leonardo's Last Supper (1969) portrayed Leonardo da Vinci as prematurely declared dead, with his subsequent "resurrection" in a filthy charnel-house.
- The Bewitched (1974), which he produced with the Royal Shakespeare Company, showed the Spanish state attempting to produce an heir for Carlos II, whom Barnes portrayed as being an impotent imbecile.
- Laughter! (1978) was his most controversial work, a double-bill that jumped from the reign of Ivan the Terrible to a satire based on the tedious bureaucracy required to sustain Auschwitz concentration camp.
- Red Noses (1985) depicts a sprightly priest, originally played by Antony Sher, who travelled around the plague-affected villages of 14th-century France with a band of fools, known as God's Zanies, offering holy assistance. It was for this play that Barnes won his Olivier award.

=== Later life ===
In his later years Barnes turned his attention more in the direction of films, radio, and television. His screenplay for Elizabeth von Arnim's The Enchanted April earned him a nomination for the best adapted screenplay Oscar in 1992. He also wrote several hugely successful mini-series for U.S. television, including Arabian Nights, Merlin and Noah's Ark. For BBC Radio 3 he wrote a series of monologues entitled Barnes's People, for which he attracted a large number of well known actors: Laurence Olivier, John Gielgud, Alec Guinness, Peggy Ashcroft, Judi Dench, and Ian McKellen. His television miniseries for ABC and NBC were the most popular of the day with record audiences.

Barnes continued writing historical comedies throughout the 1990s. These include Sunsets and Glories (1990), Dreaming (1999) which transferred to London's West End, and Jubilee (2001). He was the Royal Shakespeare Company's most produced living playwright at the time.

The last play that Barnes completed was Babies, which is based on his experiences as an elderly father. His second wife gave birth to a daughter when he was 69, followed by triplets a year later.

John Irvin directed his The Moon and the Stars with Alfred Molina about the film business in 1930s' Rome. A revival of his Noonday Demons was produced by renowned theatre designer John Napier. Barnes television miniseries are shown yearly as holiday favourites.

== Personal life ==
Barnes, who had two sons and two daughters, married twice – in 1958 to Charlotte Beck and in 1995 to Christie Horn. His second wife, Christie, gave birth to his first daughter Leela in 2000 when he was 69. Leela is a writer, following in her father's footsteps. Barnes, who received much American mainstream media attention for his movies and US television miniseries in later life, quickly became a tabloid obsession in 2002 when he became a father again at the age of 71. This time Christie gave birth to triplets Abigail, Nathaniel and Zachary. Barnes died of a stroke on 1 July 2004.

== Works ==
=== Theatre plays ===
- The Time of the Barracudas, Curran Theatre, San Francisco, 1963
- Sclerosis, Aldwych Theatre, 1965
- The Ruling Class, Nottingham/Piccadilly Theatre, 1968
- Leonardo’s Last Supper, Open Space, 1969
- Noonday Demons, Open Space, 1969
- The Bewitched, RSC at the Aldwych Theatre, 1974
- Laughter!, Royal Court, 1978
- Somersaults (revue), Leicester, 1981
- Red Noses, RSC, 1985
- Sunsets And Glories, Yorkshire Playhouse, 1990
- Luna Park Eclipses, National Theatre Studio, 1995
- Corpsing (revue), Tristan Bates Theatre, 1996
- Clap Hands Here Comes Charlie, (first act was to have been performed in 1967, second act written in 1996)
- Heaven’s Blessings, Florida State University, 1997
- Dreaming, Royal, Exchange & Queen’s Theatre, 1999
- Jubilee, RSC, 2001

=== Original works for radio ===
- My Ben Jonson, 1973
- Barnes' People : Seven Monologues, 1981
- Barnes' People II: Seven Duologues, 1984
- Barnes People III: Eight Trialogues, 1986
- No End to Dreaming, 1987
- More Barnes' People, 1990

=== Original screenplays ===
- Violent Moment (film, Anglo Amalgamated, 1959)
- Breakout (film, Anglo Amalgamated, 1959)
- The White Trap (film, Anglo Amalgamated, 1959)
- The Professionals (film, Anglo Amalgamated, 1960)
- The Devil Inside (aka Off-Beat, film, 1961)
- Ring of Spies (aka, Ring of Treason, film written with Frank Launder, 1964)
- Not with My Wife, You Don't! (film co-writer, 1966)
- The Ruling Class (film, 1972)

=== Original teleplays ===
- Checkmate (No Hiding Place TV series 1959)
- With Suicidal Intent (No Hiding Place TV series 1959)
- Who Is Gustav Varnia? (No Hiding Place TV series 1959)
- The Man with a Feather in His Hat (Armchair Mystery Theatre TV Series 1960)
- Breakout (Kraft Mystery Theater TV Series 1961)
- Nobody Here but Us Chickens: Nobody Here but Us Chickens, More than a Touch of Zen, Not as Bad as They Seem (Channel 4, 1989)
- Revolutionary Witness: The Patriot, The Preacher, The Butcher, The Amazon 1989
- The Spirit of Man (BBC Two 1990)
- Bye Bye Columbus (BBC Two 1992)
- Merlin (Hallmark 1998): two episodes

=== Adaptations for stage, screen and radio ===
- Lulu: A Sex Tragedy (adaptation of Frank Wedekind's plays Earth Spirit and Pandora's Box), produced at Nottingham Playhouse / Royal Court Theatre, London, 1970
- The Alchemist (adaptation of a play by Ben Jonson), produced at Old Vic Theatre, 1970
- The Devil Is an Ass (adaptation of a play by Ben Jonson), produced at Nottingham Playhouse, 1973 revised version, Edinburgh Festival, 1976 then National Theatre, London, 1977
- For All Those Who Get Despondent (cabaret; based on works by Bertolt Brecht and Frank Wedekind), produced at Theatre Upstairs, 1976
- The Frontiers of Farce (adaptation of the plays The Purging by Georges Feydeau and The Singer by Frank Wedekind), produced at Old Vic Theatre, 1976
- Bartholomew Fair (based on the play by Ben Jonson), produced at Round House Theatre, 1978 then London, 1987
- Antonio (based on John Marston's plays Antonio' and Mellida and Antonio's Revenge), produced at Nottingham Playhouse, 1979
- Chaste Maid in Cheapside (radio adaptation of a play by Thomas Middleton), BBC, 1979
- The Two Hangmen (radio adaptation of Barnes's stage play For All Those Who Get Despondent), 1979
- Eulogy on Baldness (radio adaptation of a work by Synesius of Cyrene), BBC, 1980
- The Devil Himself (revue; adaptation of works by Frank Wedekind), music by Carl Davis and Stephen Deutsch, produced at Lyric Hammersmith Theatre, London, 1980
- The Atheist (radio adaptation of play by Thomas Otway), BBC, 1981
- The Singer (radio adaptation of work by Frank Wedekind), 1981
- The Soldier's Fortune (radio adaptation of a play by Thomas Otway), BBC, 1981
- The Dutch Courtesan (radio adaptation of play by John Marston), BBC, 1982
- The Magician, (radio adaptation of work by Maxim Gorky), 1982
- A Mad World, My Masters (radio adaptation of a play by Thomas Middleton), 1983
- The Primrose Path (radio adaptation of a play by Georges Feydeau), 1984
- Il Candelaio/ The Candlemaker (adaptation of a play by Giordano Bruno), produced at Barbican Theatre, London, 1985
- A Trick to Catch the Old One (radio adaptation of a play by Thomas Middleton), 1985
- Scenes from a Marriage (based on the play by Georges Feydeau), produced at Barbican Theatre, London, 1986
- The Old Law (radio adaptation of a play by Thomas Middleton, William Rowley and Philip Massinger), 1986
- Woman of Paris (radio adaptation of work by Henri Becque), 1986
- Don Juan and Faust (radio adaptation of by C. D. Grabbe), 1987
- The Magnetic Lady (radio adaptation of a play by Ben Jonson), 1987
- Tango at the End of Winter (based on a play by Kunio Shimizu), produced in London, 1991
- Hard Times (television adaptation of the novel by Charles Dickens), BBC, 1994
- Enchanted April (screen adaptation of the novel by Elizabeth Von Arnim), Miramax, 1992
- Voices (aka Voices from a Locked Room, screen adaptation written with Nicholas Meyer of the book Double Jeopardy by Mark A. Stuart), 1995
- Noah's Ark (television adaptation) Hallmark, 1999
- A Christmas Carol (television adaptation) Hallmark, 1999
- Alice in Wonderland (television adaptation) Hallmark, 1999
- Arabian Nights (television adaptation) Hallmark, 2000

== Selected filmography ==
- Violent Moment (1959)

== Bibliography ==
- Woolland, Brian (2004). Dark Attractions: The Theatre of Peter Barnes. London, Methuen, ISBN 0-413-77442-2.
