= List of The Saint episodes =

This is an episode guide for the television series The Saint, which originally aired in the United Kingdom between 1962 and 1969. The series was developed by Robert S. Baker based upon the literary character created by Leslie Charteris. The majority of the episodes listed below – including all of the black-and-white episodes – were adaptations of short stories, novellas and novels in the Charteris canon.

Production blocks: (1) series one 26 episodes, (2) series two 13 episodes. (3) The next 32 episodes were made as series two and the 39 previous episodes were rebranded as series one for worldwide distribution. (4) 30 episodes plus the feature film version of "The Fiction Makers". (5) 13 episodes plus the feature film version of "Vendetta for the Saint". "The Fiction Makers" was shot by director Roy Ward Baker in a dual format, principally as a feature for European Cinema distribution, and as a television two-parter scripted to include a scene to begin part two with the usual The Saint halo sequence (the film and TV versions are edited differently also). The film version was given a U certificate by the British Board of Film Censors (BBFC) on 29 September 1966. "Vendetta for the Saint" was made without provision for a TV edit and has no special halo sequence for part two; also part two has the film version's 'end' caption. The 71 b/w episodes were originally divided into four series in the UK and the colour episodes were series 5 and 6. The colour episodes were originally broadcast in the UK in black and white, predating the advent of colour TV transmissions on ITV.

As will be noted in the episode synopses, many actors besides Roger Moore would make appearances throughout the James Bond movie franchise.

Black-and-white episodes were produced by Robert S. Baker and Monty Berman and are A New World Production for ITC. The first 20 episodes are copyright: ITC Incorporated Television Company Ltd and Granada Television Network Ltd.

Colour episodes were produced by Robert S. Baker and are A Bamore Production for ITC.

== Series overview ==
Series	Episodes	Originally released	
Series	Episodes	First released	Last released
1	12	4 October 1962	20 December 1962
2	27	19 September 1963	19 March 1964
3	23	8 October 1964	11 March 1965
4	9	1 July 1965	26 August 1965
5	27	30 September 1966	22 June 1967
6	20	29 September 1968	9 February 1969

== Episodes ==
=== Series 1: 1962 ===
No. overall	No. in series	Title	Original release date
1	1	"The Talented Husband"	4 October 1962
Guest cast: Derek Farr, Shirley Eaton (1), Patricia Roc ... George Roderick, Donald Churchill, Norman Mitchell, John Kelland (1), Howard Douglas (1), Clemence Bettany Based on a story in The Saint Around the World. Together with Adrienne (Shirley Eaton), a glamorous insurance agent, Simon Templar must protect a woman from her wife-killing husband. The Saint parks his car outside The Ferry Inn, Cookham.
2	2	"The Latin Touch"	11 October 1962
Guest cast: Alexander Knox ... Doris Nolan, Bill Nagy (1), Warren Mitchell (1), Peter Illing (1) ... Marie Burke (1), Suzan Farmer (1), Robert Easton, Caroll Simpson, Anita Sharp Bolster, Charles Irwin, Roy Patrick (1), David Calderisi, Tony Arpino (1) Simon helps a young American woman (Suzan Farmer) who is being overcharged by a taxi driver (Warren Mitchell) in Rome, and finds himself caught up in a kidnapping case.
3	3	"The Careful Terrorist"	18 October 1962
Guest cast: David Kossoff ... Peter Dyneley (1), Percy Herbert (1), Alan Gifford (1) ... Sally Bazely, Gary Cockrell (1), Robert Ayres (1), Nicholas Stuart (1), Dorinda Stevens, George Sperdakos, Jared Allen, Clay Johns In New York, after Simon's journalist friend, Lester Boyd (Gary Cockrell), is murdered by a crooked union boss, Nat Grendel (Peter Dyneley), the Saint decides he must bring him to justice.
4	4	"The Covetous Headsman"	25 October 1962
Guest cast: Barbara Shelley ... Eugene Deckers, George Pastell (1) ... Esmond Knight, Robert Cawdron (1), Carole Gray, Josephine Brown, Michael Spear, Andre Boulay (1), Natalie Benesch, Barbara Roscoe Flying Pan Am to Paris, Simon meets a woman, Valerie North (Barbara Shelley), caught up in a drama—and the silver St. Christopher medal she wears may be the key to solving the mystery.
5	5	"The Loaded Tourist"	1 November 1962
Guest cast: Barbara Bates ... Edward Evans (1), Guy Deghy (1) ... Joseph Cuby, Norman Florence (1), Michael Ritterman (1), John Dearth (1), Andrew Sachs, Raymond Ray (1), David Cargill (1), John Gray Visiting Geneva, Simon witnesses a murder, and he becomes involved with a family hunting for a briefcase they cannot afford to lose.
6	6	"The Pearls of Peace"	8 November 1962
Guest cast: ... Dina Paisner, Erica Rogers (1), Bob Kanter ... Robin Hughes, John Barrard, Warren Stanhope (1), Frank Olegario (1), Hugh Futcher, Steven Scott (1) In New York, Simon recounts a story that began three years ago, when he invested $ 3,000 in a pearl expedition in Mexico. The business partners fall out, and Simon hears no more about the matter until Joss Hendry (Erica Rogers) receives a letter from her former paramour, Brad Ryan (Bob Kanter), to come to the town of Santa Domingo in Mexico. He claims to have found the pearls. She asks Simon for help.
7	7	"The Arrow of God"	15 November 1962
Guest cast: ... Elspeth March (1), Ronald Leigh-Hunt (1), Honor Blackman, Tony Wright (1), Anthony Dawson ... Anne Sharp (1), Gordon Tanner, John Arnatt, John Carson (1), Alec Mango (1), Thomas Baptiste (1), Pearl Prescod, Hazel Futa Simon is visiting Nassau, Bahamas, and appears enraged by the local gossip columnist, Floyd Vosper (Anthony Dawson). Simon is visiting the Wexalls, who have also invited Vosper for the weekend. Herbert Wexall (Ronald Leigh-Hunt) has an attractive secretary, Pauline Stone (Honor Blackman).
8	8	"The Element of Doubt"	22 November 1962
Guest cast: ... David Bauer (1), Alan Gifford (2), Margaret Vines, Bill Nagy (2), Ken Wayne, Anita West ... Robert O'Neil, Stella Bonheur (1), Graydon Gould, Basil Howes, Alistair Williamson, John Bloomfield (1), Sarah Brackett (1), Victor Chenet In New York, Simon is taking a close interest in attorney Carlton Rood (David Bauer) and his uncanny ability to defend his clients to the fullest extent allowed by the court, particularly Joe Sholto (Bill Nagy). who has recently been cleared of setting a warehouse alight, a decision which cannot be challenged in law.
9	9	"The Effete Angler"	29 November 1962
Guest cast: Shirley Eaton (2) ... George Pravda (1), Patrick McAllinney ... Paul Stassino (1), Jack Gwillim (1), Roland Brand, Kevin Scott (1), Gladys Taylor, Ronald Wilson (1) In Miami, Simon Templar wants to go fishing, and he shares a trip with Gloria Uckrose (Shirley Eaton). George Pravda plays Gloria's husband, Clinton Uckrose, and he is very nervous; no one believes the Saint's story that he just wants a quiet fishing trip.
10	10	"The Golden Journey"	6 December 1962
Guest cast: ... Erica Rogers (2) ... Stella Bonheur (2), Paul Whitsun-Jones (1), Roger Delgado (1), David Lawton, Richard Montez (1), Ricardo Cortez Based on a story from The Saint in Europe. In a restaurant on the Costa Brava, Spain, Belinda Dean (Erica Rogers) is shouting for a well-cooked filet mignon and generally behaving as a spoiled brat who, in a month's time, is marrying a friend of Simon's – Jack Eastern. Whilst Belinda sleeps, the Saint relieves her of her cash and other assets, and so he has the pleasure of escorting her to Tormes in a week to meet Jack.
11	11	"The Man Who Was Lucky"	13 December 1962
Guest cast: ... Eddie Byrne (1), Delphi Lawrence, Campbell Singer (1), Vera Day, Harry Towb (1) ... Charles Houston (1), Nicholas Selby, John Forbes-Robertson (1), Jack Taylor, John Sullivan, Dickie Owen The Saint spends an evening at the dogs, where he sees "Lucky" Joe Luckner (Eddie Byrne) enjoying his usual winning ways. It soon transpires that "Lucky" has a business on the side – running a protection racket that seeks to inveigle Messrs Bailey and O'Connor, turf accountants, into using his services. Cora (Delphi Lawrence) is the girlfriend of O'Connor (Harry Towb), whom she convinces to go into hiding after Luckner beats Bailey (Nicholas Selby) to death.
12	12	"The Charitable Countess"	20 December 1962
Guest cast: Patricia Donahue (1) ... Nigel Davenport (1), Warren Mitchell (2), Anthony Newlands (1), Philip Needs ... Anthony Jacobs, Marie Burke (2), Irene Prador, Victor Rietti, Neville Becker (1), Loretta Parry, Hugo De Vernier Simon has been invited to a charity ball in Rome by Countess Ravagna (Patricia Donahue) in aid of "The Little Bandits," as the street children have been named, and they have a motto: if you can lift it, you can steal it–who themselves plan to target the attendees of the ball. Warren Mitchell returns as the Italian taxi driver who had appeared in an earlier episode in Rome.

=== Series 2: 1963–64 ===
No. overall	No. in series	Title	Original release date
13	1	"The Fellow Traveller"	19 September 1963
Guest cast: Dawn Addams ... Glyn Owen, Neil McCallum ... Michael Peake, Angus Lennie, Jeanne Watts, Brian Oulton, Michael Bates Based on the story The Sizzling Saboteur. Visiting Stevenage, Simon parks outside the Cromwell Hotel, where (in those days) there are no spare rooms with a bathroom. The Saint comes face to face with drama in a bus shelter, which includes a sudden death, sabotage and a beautiful woman, Magda Vamoff (Dawn Addams) which leads him on a Blue Goose chase.
14	2	"Starring the Saint"	26 September 1963
Guest cast: ... Ronald Radd, Wensley Pithey, Alfred Burke ... Monica Stevenson, Alexander Davion, Paul Whitsun-Jones (2), Jerry Stovin, Ivor Dean, John Dunbar, Brian Weske, Jackie Collins, John Gayford, John Martin, Bryan Marshall From the story Hollywood. Byron Ufferlitz (Ronald Radd), a somewhat unscrupulous film producer, wants Simon Templar to play the Saint in a film telling his own life story. However, events take an interesting turn when Simon discovers the body of Byron Ufferlitz with Peggy Warden (Ufferlitz's secretary) hiding behind the curtains.
15	3	"Judith"	3 October 1963
Guest cast: ... Julie Christie, David Bauer (2), Margo Johns, John McLaren, John Serret ... Ross Parker, Warren Stanhope (2), Robert MacLeod, William Greene, Andre Boulay (2), Ronald Wilson (2), Georges Robin Wheeler dealer businessman Burt Northwade (David Bauer) is immorally selling a gas turbine design built by his brother Dr. Northwade. Whilst set in Canada, Burt's mansion is identifiably in North London! The Saint is accused of trespassing on the mansion's grounds. Judith (Julie Christie) has her own reasons for wanting the plans which are very valuable to replace petrol engines in cars.
16	4	"Teresa"	10 October 1963
Guest cast: Lana Morris ... Eric Pohlmann, Marne Maitland, Lawrence Dane, Marie Burke (3) ... Alexander Davion, Richard Montez (2), Paul Whitsun-Jones (3), Alan Browning, Frank Olegario (2), George Little, Peter Exposite In Mexico, Mrs. Teresa Alvarez (Lana Morris) is seeking her husband Gaspar, who disappeared two years earlier after making a failed attempt on the life of the President. She and Simon both know Miguel Artigas (Alexander Davion), a trapeze artist at the circus who was with Gaspar on the night that he disappeared. Miguel is shot during the performance, and dies shortly after passing key information to his wife and the Saint.
17	5	"The Elusive Ellshaw"	17 October 1963
Guest cast: ... Angela Browne, Richard Vernon, Ellen McIntosh ... Philip Latham, Anthony Bate, Walter Brown, Philip Bond, Norman Pitt, Arthur Hewlett, James Ottaway, Nicholas Pennell Based on a story from The Saint Goes On. With a number of location shots returning us to London, a wife, Mrs. Ellshaw (Ellen McIntosh) spots her missing husband, Mr. Ellshaw (Philip Latham), through a shop window, and she follows him to a flat which the Saint visits -- only to find it completely empty. Returning to Mrs Ellshaw's flat, Simon and Anne Ripwell (Angela Browne) find her body and Inspector Claude Teal (Norman Pitt) takes statements. There is then at attempt on the life of Sir John Ripwell (Richard Vernon).
18	6	"Marcia"	24 October 1963
Guest cast: Samantha Eggar ... Kenneth MacKintosh, Marion Mathie ... Johnny Briggs, Jill Melford, Philip Stone, Stanley Meadows, Tony Beckley, Janet Davies, Philip Anthony, Virginia Clay, Peter Duguid From the story The Beauty Specialist. Claire Avery (Samantha Eggar) has been recruited to fill the shoes of the late Marcia Landon, who committed suicide following an acid attack which had ended her film career. Claire does not have much experience and the entire film crew members have no belief in her, which is only made worse when she receives a blackmail demand. Screenplay: Harry W. Junkin Director: John Krish
19	7	"The Work of Art"	31 October 1963
Guest cast: ... Yolande Turner, Alex Scott, Martin Benson ... John Bailey, Robert Cawdron (2), Manning Wilson, Hamilton Dyce, Hazel Hughes, Neville Becker (2), Mika Iveria, Anne Sharp (2), Tom Naylor, June Smith Adapted from The Spanish War. Simon Templar is visiting Paris where a friend, Juliette (Yolande Turner), is a clothes designer but the firm for which she is working also has an agent of the Algerian rebels, Jean Bougrenet (John Bailey) in their midst -- and when he fails to liquidate some forged bonds for the rebels, his death becomes a matter which the Saint investigates.
20	8	"Iris"	7 November 1963
Guest cast: Barbara Murray ... David Bauer (3), Ivor Dean, Cyril Luckham ... Ferdy Mayne, John Ronane, Anthony Wager, Barry Linehan, Meadows White, April Wilding Mary Hardy (April Wilding) has sought the assistance of Simon Templar in connection with a play in which she is due to appear. The play appears to be a complete flop which Rick Lansing (David Bauer) is financing for the benefit of his wife Iris (Barbara Murray). However Simon knows that Lansing is running a protection racket which leads to the "accidental" death of Harry Blundel (Meadows White). NOTE: This is the first episode of the series where Simon looks up at the halo above his head before the opening credits.
21	9	"The King of the Beggars"	14 November 1963
Guest cast: Maxine Audley, Oliver Reed, Yvonne Romain ... Warren Mitchell (3), John McLaren ... Charles Houston (2), Jessie Robins, Bruno Barnabe, Ronald Corbett, Cesare Maranzana, Gino Coia Simon is back in Rome and re-united with the friendly taxi-driver, Marco Di Cesari (Warren Mitchell as before). Simon has witnessed the murder of a blind beggar and then sees another female beggar being attacked for protection money by Joe Catelli (Oliver Reed). The female beggar is actually an actress, Theresa Mantania (Yvonne Romain), whom the Saint has seen wearing the same costume on stage. So who is extorting money from the beggars?
22	10	"The Rough Diamonds"	21 November 1963
Guest cast: Douglas Wilmer ... Ivor Dean, George A. Cooper, Vanda Godsell ... Paul Stassino (2), Jemma Hyde, Michael Meacham, William Dexter, Ray Austin, Geoffrey Palmer, Frank Jarvis Adapted from The Black Market. Simon Templar enjoys a trip First Class accompanying £100,000 worth of diamonds from Africa back to the United Kingdom at the request of Alan Uttershaw (Douglas Wilmer), and an armoured van is due to meet the plane at Gatwick. Pete Ferguson (Geoffrey Palmer) is the driver of the van who is murdered when the van is hijacked and provides a reason for an investigation by the Saint. During a dance, there is one noteworthy statement: "The Twist is finished"!
23	11	"The Saint Plays with Fire"	28 November 1963
Guest cast: Joseph Fürst ... Justine Lord, John Robinson, Margaretta Scott, Geoffrey Denton ... Ivor Dean, Robert Brown, Raymond Adamson, John Hollis, Joe Robinson, John Kelland (2), Tony Beckley. Based on the book Prelude for War The British Nazi Party is staging a comeback, and Simon Templar is introduced to a journalist writing an exposé of the financing at a rally in Trafalgar Square. The subsequent death of the journalist, John Kennet (Tony Beckley), takes place in a fire at the home of Sydney Fairweather, in a locked room from which the Saint is unable to extract him. The inquest appears to be a complete whitewash until the Saint gives evidence.
24	12	"The Well Meaning Mayor"	5 December 1963
Guest cast: ... Leslie Sands, Mary Kenton, Norman Bird, Mandy Miller ... Noel Trevarthen, Cameron Hall, Kenneth Henry, David Morell, Robert Sansom, John Gill In Seatondean on the south coast, Sam Purdell (Leslie Sands) has just been re-elected mayor, defeating his rival George Hackett (Norman Bird), who accuses the mayor of corruption over major development contracts in the town. After Hackett dies in a car accident, his daughter Molly (Mandy Miller) asks Simon to investigate, and he offers the mayor a bribe, which is soundly rejected - so what has really been happening?
25	13	"The Sporting Chance"	12 December 1963
Guest cast: ... Derren Nesbitt, Gerard Heinz, Godfrey Quigley, Carol Cleveland, Brandon Brady ... Harry Webster, Bruce Boa, Nicholas Stuart (2), Nan Marriott-Watson, William Buck, Evan Thomas In Ontario, Professor Mueller (Gerard Heinz), a defector from the GDR, feels that the Canadian government has not kept its promise to enable his family to join him despite having delivered all that they need for a satellite guidance system. He is planning to go back - but his family manages to defect and the messenger sent to tell him they are safe mysteriously dies. Like the Professor, Simon is on a fishing trip in Ontario and the death of his friend raises questions. Carol Cleveland plays Marion Kent, who is a secretary, and Derren Nesbitt plays Netchideff, who is charged with getting the Professor back to East Germany.
26	14	"The Bunco Artists"	19 December 1963
Guest cast: Mary Merrall, Peter Dyneley (2) ... Justine Lord, Louise King ... Victor Platt, John Glyn Jones, Marie Makino, Barbara Oglivie, Andre Maranne, John Standing, Meadows White Netherdon Parish Church is in need of a final £2000 for the restoration fund, and a mysterious visitor, Mrs. Wades, offers the cash providing she can see the existing £6000 in cash as part of the due diligence of the charity. Jean Yarmouth (Justine Lord) is the daughter of the vicar's secretary and a close friend of Simon Templar; she happens to be around when an American detective, Henderson (Peter Dyneley) arrives with the local police to arrest Mrs. Wades. The detective and Mrs. Wades disappear to Nice where the Saint pursues them to try and recover the missing funds.
27	15	"The Benevolent Burglary"	26 December 1963
Guest cast: John Barrie, Gary Cockrell (2), Rachel Gurney ... Suzanne Neve, Raymond Adamson, Arnold Diamond ... Allan McClelland, Barry Keegan, Henry Vidon, Ian Parsons, Richard Clarke, Ivor Salter, Andre Maranne In Monte Carlo this week, Simon assists a musician friend, Bill Fulton (Gary Cockrell), win the hand of Meryl Vascoe (Suzanne Neve), the daughter of Elliott Vascoe (John Barrie), whom it seems needs to be taught a lesson. Mr. Vascoe believes that his art gallery with an excellent alarm system cannot be burgled. The Saint enters into a bet for £5000 with Mr. Vascoe that someone will manage it within 4 days in front of the press - which leads to the challenge being widely reported.
28	16	"The Wonderful War"	2 January 1964
Guest cast: Renée Houston, Noel Purcell ... Alfred Burke, Alec Mango (2), Patrick Westwood ... David Graham, John Bennett, Ferdy Mayne, Louis Raynor, Jack Lambert, Suzanna Leigh. Oil has been discovered in the Middle Eastern nation of Sayeda, but the Prime Minister and the army stage a coup, killing the ruler but allowing his son, Prince Karim (Louis Raynor), to escape to Kuwait, aided by Mike Kelly (Noel Purcell). Lilla McAndrew (Suzanna Leigh) is concerned for her missing father (also murdered) and requests assistance from Simon Templar to establish the truth -- and also to re-instate the son as ruler, perhaps?
29	17	"The Noble Sportsman"	9 January 1964
Guest cast: Sylvia Syms, Anthony Quayle ... Francis Matthews, Paul Curran, Jane Asher, Russell Waters, Martin Wyldeck, Howard Douglas (2) Lord Yearley (Anthony Quayle), the "Noble Sportsman", is a renowned sportsman with a much younger wife (Sylvia Sims), who has a wandering eye - she ends her relationship with architect Paul Farley (Francis Matthews) when she finds out that she is pregnant. Lord Yearley's daughter Rose (Jane Asher) knows Simon Templar, whom she approaches for help when her father receives a letter threatening that he will be killed.
30	18	"The Romantic Matron"	16 January 1964
Guest cast: ... Ann Gillis, John Carson (2), Christopher Rhodes, Patrick Troughton, Michael Rittermann (2) ... Joby Blanshard, Victor Spinetti, Madge Brindley, Laurence Taylor, Peter Diamond, Kaplan Kaye, Peter Elliott, George Little, Bill Cartwright In Buenos Aires, there has been a recent gold security van heist, a glamorous American traveller, Beryl Carrington (Ann Gillis), Simon Templar and a curious story concerning the "resistance" to a new government spun by Ramone Venino (John Carson) who is being "followed" by a pair of unsavoury characters. Inevitably Simon has to explain it all to the local Inspector of police (Patrick Troughton).
31	19	"Luella"	23 January 1964
Guest cast: David Hedison ... Suzanne Lloyd ... Susan Lloyd, Aiden Turner, Michael Wynne, Jean St Clair, John Woodnutt, Julian Holloway, Peter Fontaine Bill Harvey (David Hedison) arrives with his attractive wife for a stay in London - but Doris (Suzanne Lloyd) has to go to Paris to see her expectant sister. Bill wants to party, but Simon has promised to look after him. However, Simon eventually agrees to a night on the town - during which Bill suffers. The following night in his hotel, Luella (credited as Susan Lloyd and later known as Sue Lloyd) orders a martini and Bill immediately shows an interest. A compromising situation and some blackmail require the involvement of the Saint to get every thing straightened out. NOTE: As an inside joke, Simon Templar was confused for James Bond in the episode (he even looks at his halo at the end of the episode after being called out as so). Roger Moore had been offered the movie role twice during the run of the series, not being able to accept until 1972. Ironically, David Hedison joined Roger Moore in his first Bond film Live and Let Die in 1973 as Felix Leiter.
32	20	"The Lawless Lady"	30 January 1964
Adapted from a story in the 1930 book Enter the Saint. Guest cast: Dawn Addams ... Julian Glover, Ivor Dean ... Ronald Ibbs, John G. Heller, David Sumner, James Belchamber, Anthea Wyndham, Kenneth Benda, Dorothy Black, Stuart Saunders, Anne Sharp (3), Gerald Young, Edith Saville Countess Audrey (Dawn Addams) is the apparent object of Simon Templar's affection - but he has noticed a coincidence between the guests she entertains and the houses of those guests being the subject of break-ins and thefts. He proposes that they become partners in crime, and she accepts. Hilloram (Julian Glover) is her chauffeur and undertakes the thefts until replaced by the Saint. Countess Audrey is planning a huge heist whilst on board a yacht leaving Cannes - having invited some very rich people and their jewellery.
33	21	"The Good Medicine"	6 February 1964
Guest cast: Barbara Murray ... Anthony Newlands (2), Jean Marsh ... Bill Nagy (3), John Bennett, Veronica Turleigh, Bruce Montague, Alexandra Dane Denise (Barbara Murray) married Philippe Dumont (Anthony Newlands), a chemist, in Beauvais, France where they create a huge cosmetics empire based on his knowledge and her drive, leading to the "Denise Dumont" empire using heavy advertising and employing 300 staff. Denise then dumps Philippe, and later she is introduced to Simon Templar by journalist David Stern (Bill Nagy). David Stern and Philippe's sister, Marie (Jean Marsh), encourage Simon to redress the financial balance when polite requests for funds are rejected.
34	22	"The Invisible Millionaire"	13 February 1964
Guest cast: ... Katherine Blake, Michael Goodliffe, Nigel Stock, Eunice Gayson, Jane Asher, Basil Dignam ... Mark Eden, Charles Morgan, John Gabriel, Ian Ainsley, Frank Atkinson, Peter Lawrence, Michael McKevvitt Quite early on we find out that Mrs. Marvin Chase (Katherine Blake) is rather too fond of Mr. Chase's assistant Bertrand Tamblin (a young Mark Eden, long before his stint as Alan Bradley on Coronation Street), who dies when Marvin Chase (Basil Dignam) crashes the car, the latter suffering disfiguring facial burns. Simon knows Chase's secretary, Nora Prescott (Eunice Gayson), who has some concerns when Chase starts selling all of his assets and no one can actually see him or hear him speak. Nora's murder raises even more questions.
35	23	"The High Fence"	20 February 1964
Guest cast: James Villiers ... Suzanne Lloyd, Ivor Dean ... Reginald Beckwith, Stanley Meadows, Harry Towb (2), Dyson Lovell, Claire Kelly, Peter Jeffrey, Hazel Hughes, Richard Poore Based on a story in The Saint Goes On. Gabrielle Forrest (Suzanne Lloyd) and Simon interrupt a jewellery theft in progress at the former's house. A gunshot deflates one of Simon's tyres, which enables them to get away, but a study of police photographs identifies Johnny Anworth (Harry Towb) as one of the miscreants. However, a mysterious bystander had reported them breaking into the house; who is he, and to whom was her reporting? Who is the "High Fence" who reportedly pays twice the amount any other fence offers for stolen jewellery?
36	24	"Sophia"	24 February 1964
Guest cast: Oliver Reed ... Imogen Hassall, Tommy Duggan, Peter Kriss ... John Wentworth, Hal Gallili, Wolfe Morris, Andre Malendrinos, Tony Arpino (2), Raymond Ray (2); directed by Roger Moore On holiday in Athens, Simon Templar is invited to become involved in an archaeological dig in Kyros at the invitation of Professor Grant (John Wentworth). The local hotel owner, Stavros, has an outspoken daughter Sophia (Imogen Hassall) and a roguish nephew Aristides (Oliver Reed) who has been living in Los Angeles and is apparently very rich. On arrival he is particularly interested in a valuable item uncovered by the Professor.
37	25	"The Gentle Ladies"	5 March 1964
Guest cast: ... Avice Landon, Renée Houston, Barbara Mullen, Philip O'Flynn, Anthony Nicholls ... Timothy Bateson, Christina Gregg, Frank Sieman, Gwenda Ewen, Donald Tandy, Barry Wilsher In the Sussex seaside town of Bosham, there are three elderly ladies -- Florence, Ida and Violet Warshed -- who it seems have been in "hiding" for some years until tracked down by Alfred Powls - the ladies all call him Freddie - and he is soon blackmailing them for money as he calls them by some completely different names. Florence has already met Simon Templar through a small accident and he is soon interested in Mr. Powls.
38	26	"The Ever-Loving Spouse"	12 March 1964
Guest cast: Barry Jones ... Jeanne Moody, Jacqueline Ellis, Paul Carpenter, David Bauer (4), Alexis Kanner ... Robert Arden, Janet Brandes, Max Faulkner, Hal Gallili, Stuart Nichol, John Bloomfield (2), Bartlett Mullins. Visiting San Francisco, The Saint is staying at a hotel where a convention of candy makers is taking place. One of the factory owners, Otis Fennick (Barry Jones), is caught on film in a compromising situation with a partly clad young blonde, Norma Upton, who is working with a photographer. It seems that Mrs. Fennick (Jeanne Moody) does not intend to blackmail her husband but instead wants to gain a divorce.
39	27	"The Saint Sees It Through"	19 March 1964
Guest cast: Margit Saad, Joseph Fürst ... Elspeth March (2), Guy Deghy (2) ... Larry Cross, Gordon Sterne, Carl Duering, Peter Perkins, Graeme Bruce, Caron Gardner. It appears that a former girl-friend of Simon's, Lili Klausner (Margit Saad), who is somehow both a nightclub singer in Hamburg and a person with links to a smuggling ring which has recently stolen twelve pictures from the Kremlin; needless to say, the Russians want them returned, no questions asked. Once in Hamburg, the Saint links up with Fritz Kapel (Gordon Sterne), who is working with American intelligence and then reacquaints himself with Lili, who is not admitting why she walked out on him in New York some three years earlier.

=== Series 3: 1964–65 ===
No. overall	No. in series	Title	Original release date
40	1	"The Miracle Tea Party"	8 October 1964
Guest cast: Nanette Newman, Conrad Phillips, Fabia Drake ... Basil Dignam, Charles Houston (3) ... Viktor Viko, Patrick Westwood, Robert Brown, Edward Jewesbury, Neville Whiting, Michael Standing; directed by Roger Moore Simon catches sight of Geraldine McLeod (Nanette Newman) in a telephone box at London Waterloo station when an acquaintance of hers, Franklin (Edward Jewesbury), dies (murdered) in another booth. They both work at Portland Naval Base. Before he died, Franklin placed a small box in a bag which she later discovers contains £500, whilst Simon spots that they are being followed. It transpires that Franklin was a Special Branch plant on the track of information leaks.
41	2	"Lida"	15 October 1964
Guest cast: ... Erica Rogers (3), Jeanne Moody, Barry Keegan, Peter Bowles ... Marne Maitland, Aubrey Morris, Robert Raglan, Maggie Wright, Henry McCarthy Joan Wingate (Erica Rogers) has asked for Simon's assistance because her sister, Lida Verity (Jeanne Moody), appears to have changed recently, and Joan is concerned about her odd behaviour. Simon is enjoying the warm weather in the Bahamas, while London is in the rain, but Lida's death soon sets in motion an inquiry that requires the Saint's usual skills in mental gymnastics and physical defence! The viewer, however, senses that Lida's friend, Maurice Kerr (Peter Bowles), may know more than that to which he admits.
42	3	"Jeannine"	22 October 1964
Guest cast: Sylvia Syms ... Jacqui Chan, Robert Cawdron (3), Manning Wilson, Eric Young ... Martin Miller, Peter Elliott, John Dearth (2), Peter Diamond, Michael Anthony, Maggie Wright In Paris, visiting diplomat Madam Chen (Jacqui Chan) has a very precious pearl necklace which it seems is of interest to a number of professional criminals, one of whom, Jeannine Roger (Sylvia Syms), is acting as Public Relations for Madam Chen, and is also "recognised" by the Saint under another name although it may be a mistaken identity.
43	4	"The Scorpion"	29 October 1964
Guest cast: ... Catherine Woodville, Nyree Dawn Porter, Dudley Sutton, Philip Latham ... Ivor Dean, Leon Cortez, Geoffrey Bayldon, Ronald Leigh-Hunt (2), Eve Lister From The Inland Revenue. The Saint is pontificating on the uncertainty of London weather when his phone rings - Long Harry (Philip Latham) wants help. Last week, Harry broke into a house to steal a letter for "The Scorpion". The letter was left in a locker at Victoria Station, but Harry watched for the letter to be collected, and he knew the face of the individual. It seems likely that a Government minister, Mark Everest (Ronald Leigh-Hunt) will be the subject of blackmail. Mark Everest has a secretary, Karen (Catherine Woodville), who has a habit of listening at doors and to telephone calls. The blackmailer appears to be Patsy Butler (Nyree Dawn Porter).
44	5	"The Revolution Racket"	5 November 1964
Guest cast: ... Suzanne Lloyd, Eric Pohlmann, Peter Arne, Edward Bishop, Michael Godfrey ... Hal Gallili, Alec Mango (3), Clive Cazes, Richard Montez (3), Michael Lynch, Reginald Jessup, Walter Randall In a South American republic, the Saint finds a couple of guns pointing at him inviting him to a restaurant where the local police captain, Carlos Xavier (Eric Pohlmann) treats him to a Chilean Riesling wine and provides guidance on the various other diners of the evening, especially Doris Inkler (Suzanne Lloyd) and the very rich Enriquez brothers who can afford to lead a revolution if they can source the arms needed.
45	6	"The Saint Steps In"	12 November 1964
Guest cast: Justine Lord, Geoffrey Keen, Peter Vaughan ... Moultrie Kelsall, Annette Andre ... Neil McCarthy, Michael Robbins, Edward Bishop, Nicholas Pennell, David Jackson, Robert Bruce Madeline Gray (Annette André in her first appearance in The Saint) approaches The Saint at the Savoy Plaza hotel bar in London and shows him a letter threatening her life if she sees Hobart Quennel (Geoffrey Keen) this evening. Her father has created "Process G" - a new way of producing synthetic fibres. Simon thinks it is all a hoax - until he finds that he needs to take it seriously and follows her to Quennel's house where two "police officers" are attempting a kidnapping, which Simon foils. Quennel has a very large company which has been looking at the new process but has not made a bid for it. At Quennel's house the door is answered by Andrea (Justine Lord), whilst Quennel states that the process is worthless.
46	7	"The Loving Brothers"	19 November 1964
Guest cast: ... Reg Lye, Ray Barrett, Ed Devereaux, Annette Andre ... Betty McDowall, Dick Bentley, Grant Taylor, Noel Trevarthen, John Tate Somewhere in the great Australian outback outside the Kinsall mine, the Saint's Land Rover suffers a broken feed pipe and a passing Linda Henderson (Annette André) tows him to a nearby settlement for repairs. Pop Kinsall (Reg Lye) reckons there is more silver down that mine. In O'Shea's bar, Simon gets some background on Willy and Wally Kinsell - Pop's sons whom he has not seen for 15 years. Pop is desperate as he needs 3000 quid urgently to meet the next payment on the mine lease.
47	8	"The Man Who Liked Toys"	26 November 1964
Guest cast: ... Ivor Dean, John Baskcomb, Jeanne Moody ... John Paul, Maurice Kaufmann, Rosmary Reede, David Lodge, Inigo Jackson Lewis Enstone (John Baskcomb) is thought to be the subject of blackmail, at least according to his secretary, Claire Wheeler. He is regularly taking cash out of the bank and she does not know why; after all, £750 a week is more than a mistress might cost. Claire asks the Saint to investigate - but we soon become aware that Lewis is not on good terms with his wife Marjorie (Jeanne Moody), and when Lewis Enstone dies, there is a need to investigate the suicide - or was it murder? Harry Duggan (David Lodge) is a firebrand union leader of a strike at Costello and Hammel which Lewis wants to acquire.
48	9	"The Death Penalty"	3 December 1964
Guest cast: ... Paul Stassino (3), Brewster Mason, Wanda Ventham, Scot Finch ... Arnold Diamond, Rory MacDermot, William Marlowe, Alan Curtis, Arthur Gomez, Philo Hauser The Saint was passing through Marseille until a nail in his tyre delayed him; as he tries to depart, a man dies in front of his car, dying from a bullet wound. The city is under the control of the Latini a local crime syndicate to which the dead man had links. Simon finds a beautiful blonde, Laura Stride (Wanda Ventham), striding along the highway in the mountains, and returns her home. How are these events linked? Colonel Latignant (Arnold Diamond), as ever in the south of France, is on hand to provide the narrative links. the dead man is Suza who ran much of the Latini operations locally.
49	10	"The Imprudent Politician"	10 December 1964
Guest cast: ... Anthony Bate, Jennifer Wright, Justine Lord, Michael Gough, Maxwell Shaw ...Jeremy Burnham, Mike Pratt, Jean Marsh, John Bryans, Moray Watson, Jimmy Gardner It appears that the Minister for International Trade, Christoper Waites (Anthony Bate), has been leaking information to his mistress, Denise Grant (Justine Lord). He is planning a major speech on Monday which will double the price of certain companies and the blackmailers, Tim Burton (Jeremy Burnham) and Alex Morgan (Mike Pratt), just want to know who will benefit so that they can invest now and cash in on Monday - before returning the letter to Denise which they currently hold and no one will be any the wiser. Luckily, the minister has the Saint as a house guest for the weekend.
50	11	"The Hi-Jackers"	17 December 1964
Guest cast: ... Ingrid Schoeller, Robert Nichols, Neil McCallum, Walter Gotell ... Kevin Scott (2), Michael Collins, Richard Shaw, Shane Rimmer, Roy Stephens Adapted from The Unlicensed Victuallers. Simon is enjoying the Oktoberfest in Munich, whilst we see an empty army truck being stolen and then gaining new number plates. It appears that the gang stealing the truck has designs on cigarettes and liquor under the control of the US Third Army Corps - and has someone on the inside who can provide the keys to the store: Mathilde Baum (Ingrid Schoeller), who spends the evening with the Saint at the funfair.
51	12	"The Unkind Philanthropist"	24 December 1964
Guest cast: ... Charles Farrell, Pat Michon, David Graham, Sarah Brackett (2), Garry Fulsham ... John Bloomfield (3), Dawn Davies, Anthony Morton, Larry Taylor, Joan Ingram, Olive Lucius The Saint is driving in Puerto Rico when he is stopped by a woman who says her husband, Juan, is about to be killed. When Simon Templar reaches the farm, he finds two thugs trying to evict the farmer, who has signed an agreement for a loan which he cannot repay. He also crosses the path of Miss Tristan Brown (Sarah Brackett) whom it seems has money to give away to the local poor people on behalf of a foundation ... except that to qualify for a gift, you have to give Ms. Brown $20,000. In a restaurant, Simon overhears Juan seeking more time from Elmer Quire (Charles Farrell) who is playing hardball over the loan -- and interestingly Mr. Quire is one of the potential recipients of a grant from the foundation.
52	13	"The Damsel in Distress"	31 December 1964
Guest cast: Richard Wyler ... Catherine Woodville, Paul Whitsun-Jones (4), Harold Kasket ... Ivor Dean, Ray Austin, John Bluthal, Camilla Hasse, Gwynneth Tighe An Italian restaurateur, Allessandro Naccaro, has a problem - his daughter has a child but no husband, as the miscreant Guiseppe Rolfiere has fled the country with both his secretary Barbara Astral (Katherine Woodville) and £1m from the Apex Building Society; it is a matter of grand larceny, according to Chief Inspector Teal, who is charged with the investigation. Rolfieri has been spotted in Florence and the Naccaro family want him returned to London to marry the daughter before he is murdered, whilst the police were unable to extradite him and so they would also welcome his presence on British soil by underhand means were it possible. Rolfieri is looking for a chauffeur - a job entirely suited to the capabilities of the Saint.
53	14	"The Contract"	7 January 1965
Guest cast: Dick Haymes, Robert Hutton ... Elizabeth Weaver, Ivor Dean ...John Bennett, Michael Peake, Richard Easton, Douglas Muir, Mary Jones; directed by Roger Moore Adapted from The Impossible Crime. Returning home, as most people are going to work, Simon Templar is initially the subject of a murder attempt as a car drives at him. Ardossi (John Bennett) subsequently tells him that there is a contract out on him for the sum of £5000. The Saint decides to get himself hired as his own assassin. Farnberg (Robert Hutton) has been waiting for his revenge on the Saint for many years since he went down for stealing a quarter of million dollars from a payroll robbery. Ardossi thwarts his initial meeting with Farnberg and Friste (Michael Peake).
54	15	"The Set-Up"	14 January 1965
Guest cast: ... Penelope Horner, John Stone, Henry Gilbert, Ivor Dean ... Edward Underdown, Redmond Phillips, Norman Florence (2), Anthony Wager, Faith Kent Adapted from The Man From St. Louis. It is a little after 2am at the Bay Tree Club, a Casino in London where Simon Templar is with actress Oonagh O'Grady (Penelope Horner) and her agent - Tex Goldman (Henry Gilbert). Two robbers extract cash from the safe, and as they try to achieve their departure one of the security guards is shot to enable their escape. The Saint's pursuit of one of the villains (Corrigan) is initially successful, but the trigger-happy member of the team arrives in time to silence Corrigan and then there is a need to silence the Saint - by the man who is responsible for the entire caper and the set-Up.
55	16	"The Rhine Maiden"	21 January 1965
Guest cast: ... Nigel Davenport (2), Victor Beaumont, Stephanie Randall, Anthony Booth, George Pravda (2) ... Adlina Mandlova, Frederick Schiller, Ernst Walder, Ernest Hare, Trotti Truman Taylor, Michael Wolf In Baden-Baden, Germany, The Saint sees Charles Voyson (Nigel Davenport) attempt to murder Julie Harrison (Stephanie Randall), who is concerned about a missing quarter of a million pounds. We are helpfully told that she is the daughter of Voyson's business partner, but by the time the Saint can ask Mr Voyson any questions, he appears to be dying of a heart attack. Dr Schreiber (Victor Beaumont) from a local clinic collects Voyson and takes him away from the hotel. The Saint does not believe the story which has been spun.
56	17	"The Inescapable Word"	28 January 1965
Guest cast: Ann Bell ... James Maxwell, Maurice Hedley, Robert Dean ... Robert MacLeod, Ronald Ibbs, Donald Bisset, James Copeland, Russell Waters A Scottish grouse moor also contains a rather secret government research facility, scientists wandering around in protective clothing and some strange humming noises. When one of Simon's host's, Ivor North (Maurice Headley), employees goes missing and is then found dead the Saint has a new set of mystery events to investigate particularly as another death almost immediately follows the first.
57	18	"The Sign of the Claw"	4 February 1965
Guest cast: ... Suzan Farmer (2), Peter Copley, Godfrey Quigley, Geoffrey Frederick ... Leo Leyden, Kenjin Takaki, Burt Kwouk, John Reese, Kristopher Kum, Michael Chow Adapted from Arizona. Somewhere in South-East Asia Simon Templar is visiting old friends - Don Marland (Peter Copley) and his daughter Jean (Suzan Farmer) - who have recently inherited a farm deep in the jungle which the Saint was "just passing". As dinner is about to be served they come under fire from a group of individuals who have been hiding outside who have cut the phone wires. The troops slowly close in on the house and then set fire to the warehouses. Don Marland collapses having suffered a gunshot wound before the local troops can be contacted to provide reinforcements.
58	19	"The Golden Frog"	11 February 1965
Guest cast: ... Jacqueline Ellis, Hugh McDermott, Alan Tilvern, Walter Brown ... Alex McCrindle, Inia Te Wiata, Alvaro Fontana, Barry Shawzin, Alan Curtis Arriving in the town of San Carlos in South America Simon Templar is invited - at gunpoint - to meet the "general" who does not like to be kept waiting. The Saint does not accept the invitation and goes to see an old friend Fergus MacLish who has suffered the loss of his life savings shortly before a planned retirement. The con man was Professor Nestor (Hugh McDermott) who appears to act under the instructions of his daughter Alice (Jacqueline Ellis). But where does General Cuevas and the revolutionaries come into the equation? And what is The Golden Frog?
59	20	"The Frightened Inn-Keeper"	18 February 1965
Guest cast: ... Michael Gwynn, Suzanne Neve, Percy Herbert (2) ... Howard Marion-Crawford, Norman Bird, John Gabriel, Edward Cast Based on a story in The Saint Goes On Julie Jeffroll (Suzanne Neve) has invited Simon to Cornwall to investigate mysterious noises in the middle of the night at "The Weary Traveller" a small inn owned by her father - Martyn Jeffroll (Michael Gwynn). Mr Jeffroll is unwelcoming and he is also frightened of the other three guests who were all former members of the Royal Engineers. Sneaking into one of the bedrooms when he is theoretically dead to the world having been drugged the Saint finds a suitcase full of dynamite - enough to blow up the inn and much more besides.
60	21	"Sibao"	25 February 1965
Guest cast: ... John Carson (3), Jeanne Roland, Jerry Stovin, Nicholas Stuart (3) ... Kevin Stoney, Christopher Carlos, Tracy Connell, Bruce Boa, John McClaren, Boscoe Holder Adapted from The Questing Tycoon. In Haiti the Saint is given a brief introduction to voodoo by Sibao (Jeanne Roland) who is one of the great practitioners. She is soon to marry Theron Netlord (John Carson) who does not want her displaying her accomplishments in the night club. As she walks home her brother is killed by a drunk driver who is staying in the same hotel as Simon Templar. However as a matter of the local "law" the drunk driver suffers death by voodoo and Simon identifies him as an American Intelligence Agent - and not a drunk.
61	22	"The Crime of the Century"	4 March 1965
Guest cast: ... André Morell, Sarah Lawson, William Lucas, Ivor Dean, Peter Jeffrey ... David Saire, John Forbes-Robertson (2), Carol Cleveland, Alexandra Bastedo, Cyril Chamberlain, Maggie Wright Adapted from The National Debt. Chief Inspector Teal is sure that Bernhard Raxel (André Morell) is soon to commit the crime of the century. However his "inside man" has been identified and is eliminated by Raxel's henchmen. Betty Tregarth (Sarah Lawson) is kidnapped at Heathrow Airport because she has the secret formula for a nerve gas which Raxel needs - and if it is not delivered her brother will be tortured. At much the same time the Saint is given the job of impersonating a safe cracker - Mr C Munster.
62	23	"The Happy Suicide"	11 March 1965
Guest cast: ... Jane Merrow, John Bluthal, William Sylvester, Jerry Stovin, William Dexter ... Donald Sutherland, Fred Sadoff, Mavis Villiers, Kevin Brennan and Annie Ross Simon is staying at the Waldorf Astoria in New York. He has been invited to appear on the Ziggy Zaglan (John Bluthal) television show which he politely declines. Zaglan is a very famous star but his public and private personas are completely at odds and his brother Paul, fed up with the backstage shenanigans, quits as a writer, leaving the star and his management team concerned that the private persona will be made public. His suicide attracts the interest of The Saint.

=== Series 4: 1965 ===
No. overall	No. in series	Title	Original release date
63	1	"The Checkered Flag"	1 July 1965
Guest cast: ... Eddie Byrne (2), Justine Lord, Edward de Souza, Pamela Conway ... Tim Barrett, Neil McCarthy, John Kidd, Dorothy Frere, Eliza Buckingham Catherine Marshall (Pamela Conway) approaches Simon with a story concerning her late father who invented a new fuel injection system but the patent was stolen by Oscar Newley (Eddie Byrne). The Saint is intrigued and gets Newley to explain the special fuel injection system on his new racing car which he believes will give him a spectacular win in a race tomorrow at Brands Hatch.
64	2	"The Abductors"	8 July 1965
Guest cast: ... Dudley Foster, Robert Urquhart, Annette Andre, Jennifer Jayne, Robert Cawdron (4) ... John Serret, Nicholas Courtney, Ronald Ibbs, Sandor Elès, David Garfield, Martin Wyldeck Adapted from The Gold Standard. Simon is in Paris, behind bars in the Bastille - a night club where he is recognised by Brian Quell (Robert Urquhart) who asks for his help as he believes he is being followed by two men whom we overhear are keen to attract Quell's brother - a famous professor - to Paris. The Saint then meets Madeleine Dawson (Annette Andre) at Quell's hotel and instantly her rather boring weekend trip becomes rather more exciting.
65	3	"The Crooked Ring"	15 July 1965
Guest cast: ... Walter Brown, Tony Wright (2), Meredith Edwards, Jean Aubrey ... Nosher Powell, John Tate, Barry Lineham, Irvin Allen, Doris Hare, MacDonald Hobley Adapted from The Masked Angel. Connie Grady (Jean Aubrey) has invited Simon Templar to a gym where boxers train - including Steve Nelson (Tony Wright) who is due to face the winner of tonight's bout between Torpedo Smith and The Angel (Nosher Powell). Connie is convinced that if Steve Nelson gets in the ring he will be very seriously hurt - as she does not feel the fight is entirely fair. Come Round 4 and suddenly the underdog is on top - how did that happen? The Saint is determined to find out.
66	4	"The Smart Detective"	22 July 1965
Guest cast: ... Brian Worth, Anne Lawson, Fabia Drake, Ivor Dean, Barry Shawzin ... Martin Miller, Reg Lye, Larry Taylor, Dennis Blake, Ron Welling At an exhibition of the Oppenheim Emeralds, Inspector Teal is surprised to find Simon Templar drooling over the exhibits. Security is the responsibility of Peter Corrio (Brian Worth) who believes he has installed an impregnable system to protect the jewels utilising his "criminal mind" - he thinks like a crook. Corrio has been recovering stolen jewels but Janice Dixon (Anne Lawson) has a brother who believes he was "framed" for one of the thefts - and that Corrio was responsible.
67	5	"The Persistent Parasites"	29 July 1965
Guest cast: ... Cec Linder, Jan Holden, Ann Gillis, Annette Carell, Sonia Fox ... Arnold Diamond, Brian McDermott, Jeremy Longhurst, Donald Hewlett, David Garth, Keith Smith Waldo (Cec Linder) assembles his three ex-wives (and Simon Templar) on an island off the South of France to introduce them to his intended new wife and to reveal a further secret this evening when his lawyer and nephew arrive. Before the secret is revealed a man wearing the same shirt as Waldo is discovered dead having been stabbed in the back and a motor boat is making a hasty and noiy exit from the adjacent harbour. Given the alimony being paid none of the wives would seem a likely suspect.
68	6	"The Man Who Could Not Die"	5 August 1965
Guest cast: ... Patrick Allen, Jennie Linden, Robin Phillips ... Richard Wyler, Ivor Dean, Meredith Edwards, Mary Jones; directed by Roger Moore Nigel Perry (Robin Phillips) has asked the Saint for assistance and introduces Simon to the business partner of Nigel's late father Miles Hallin (Patrick Allen). They are all invited to a game shoot this coming weekend in Wales - and Miles has apparently been drawing money from the business account - and Nigel believes that Miles is being blackmailed. Another £5000 is withdrawn so Simon and Nigel follow Miles.
69	7	"The Saint Bids Diamonds"	12 August 1965
Guest cast: ... Eunice Gayson, George Murcell, Jean St Clair, Gerard Heinz ... Peter Illing (2), Edward Bishop, Neville Becker (3), Laurence Herder, Richard Montez (4) Visiting what was then known as Teneriffe, a fortune teller advises the Saint that his life is in great danger and also describes some of the people that we are about to meet. He reveals to the fortune teller that Abdul Graner (George Murcell) stole the Regency diamond (valued at over $1m) from the Louvre and that he intends to return it to its rightful owner. In the next scene we see that Graner has little affection for his wife Christine (Eunice Gayson). Joris van Linden (Gerard Heinz) has been employed by Graner to cut another flawed diamond but Graner stops him as he is a washed up alcoholic which Graner decides to eliminate. A replacement, George Felson, is on his way from USA.
70	8	"The Spanish Cow"	19 August 1965
Guest cast: ... Gary Raymond, Viviane Ventura, Nancy Nevinson, Arnold Diamond ... Leonard Sachs, Michael Wynne, David Jackson, Nicholas Donnelly, Terry York In the South of France Simon Templar comes to the rescue of Dona Luisa Arroyo and Consuela Flores (Viviane Ventura) who were on the point of being robbed of some valuable jewellery. Dona Luisa Arroyo is the widow of General Arroyo the murdered leader of Santa Cruz and the new democratic government which replaced him would like to regain the jewellery for the benefit of the nation. Which side will the Saint support - the elected government or the brother of the General who would like to mount another revolution.
71	9	"The Old Treasure Story"	26 August 1965
Guest cast: Jack Hedley, Robert Hutton ... Erica Rogers (4), Reg Lye ... Frank Wolff, Jill Curzon, Roy Patrick (2), Joby Blanshard, Timmy Gardner, George Lowdell; directed by Roger Moore At the Lugger hotel in Cornwall Simon is greeted by an old friend, Captain Bill Williams (Reg Lye), who has a selection of tall stories with which he regales the visitors in the hotel bar which is overseen by April Mallory (Erica Rogers); the latter is very concerned over Williams' recent unusual behaviour. Simon is interested in the book which Williams has recently written under a pseudonym. Williams starts to tell the Saint about his history with a ship called West Wind and the skipper, Tom Mallory. It transpires there is a treasure map which has been divided in three and the parts need re-uniting to find the treasure in the West Indies.

=== Series 5: 1966–67 ===
Beginning with this series, episodes were produced in colour.

No. overall	No. in series	Title	Original release date
72	1	"The Queen's Ransom"	30 September 1966
Guest cast: Dawn Addams ... George Pastell (2) ... Nora Nicholson, Catherine Feller, Stanley Meadows, Gary Hope, Patrick Westwood, Peter Madden ... Neville Becker (4), John Woodvine, Larry Taylor, John Forbes-Robertson (3), Jean Serret, Andre Charise, Ernst Ulman The Saint is paid by King Fallouda to arrange safe transit of Queen Adana's (Dawn Addams) jewellery to fund a coup to regain his throne. Potentially referencing earlier appearances by Dawn Addams it is made clear that Simon and Queen Adana have had a previous encounter. NOTE: Pastell played a train conductor in 1963's From Russia with Love.
73	2	"Interlude in Venice"	7 October 1966
Guest cast: Lois Maxwell, William Sylvester ... Quinn O'Hara, Paul Stassino (4), Joyce Blair, Richard Warner, Robert Ayres (2) ... Patrick Troughton, Derek Sydney, Earl Green, Hal Galili, Tita Dane The Saint goes to the aid of a girl, Cathy Allardyce (Quinn O'Hara), who is resisting a man's advances in Venice. Her step-mother, Helen Allardyce, is played by Lois Maxwell whilst Patrick Troughton is Guido Gambetti, the local policeman. NOTE: James Bond Connections: Sylvester & Stassino (François Derval / Angelo Palazzi in Thunderball) were in previous episodes but Bond fans definitely know Lois Maxwell, who played Miss Moneypenny in the first 14 films from 1962's Dr. No to 1985's A View to a Kill.
74	3	"The Russian Prisoner"	14 October 1966
Guest cast: ... Penelope Horner, Joseph Fürst ... Guy Deghy (3), Yootha Joyce, Godfrey Quigley, Anthony Booth, Robert Crewdson, Sandor Eles, Raymond Adamson, Alexis Chesnakov, William Buck When Simon Templar takes a holiday in Geneva, Switzerland, he encounters a beautiful girl Irma (Penelope Horner) and a Russian professor, Professor Karel Jorovitch (Joseph Fürst) who plans to defect. Yootha Joyce and Anthony Booth are part of the Russian security team.
75	4	"The Reluctant Revolution"	21 October 1966
Guest cast: Barry Morse ... Jennie Linden ... Martin Benson, Peter Illing (3), Gerard Heinz, Michael Godfrey, Peter Halliday, John Garrie, Louis Raynor, Maria Roza, Norman Florence (3), Clive Cazes, Walter Randall Set in "San Pablo" an unidentified part of South America, Simon Templar meets a young lady, Diane Holbrook (Jennie Linden), who is determined to carry out an assassination. Writer: John Stanton Director: Leslie Norman
76	5	"The Helpful Pirate"	28 October 1966
Guest cast: Erika Remberg ... Paul Maxwell, Vladek Sheybal, Anneke Wills, Redmond Phillips, George Pravda (3), Jack Gwillim (2), Michael Wolf, Laurence Herder, Ray Austin, Otto Diament When a conman, Frankie Kolben (Paul Maxwell) and his girlfriend, Eva (Erika Remberg) trick a prominent scientist with a tale about hidden treasure he is taken hostage in Hamburg and sold to the Russians. Anneke Wills plays Fran Roeding the daughter of the missing scientist. NOTE: James Bond Connections: Templar is requested to work for British Intelligence, but to meet this superior for the mission, one has to press the "M" key on a typewriter 3 times which opens a secret door. Vladek Sheybal plays Kronsteen (SPECTRE Number 5) in From Russian With Love. Pravda was Kutze and Gwillim uncredited in Thunderball.
77	6	"The Convenient Monster"	4 November 1966
Guest cast: Suzan Farmer (3), Laurence Payne ... Caroline Blakiston, Moultrie Kelsall, Fulton Mackay, William Holmes, Anne Blake, Ewan Roberts, Alistair Hunter, Brown Derby, Michael Graham, Harry Littlewood The Loch Ness monster is under suspicion following a spate of hideous deaths. Ann Clanraith (Suzan Farmer) is secretary to Noel Bastion (Laurence Payne) who is married to Eleanor (Caroline Blakiston) who live close to the edge of Loch Ness. Mrs Bastion is a firm believer in the existence of the monster.
78	7	"The Angel's Eye"	11 November 1966
Guest cast: ... Jane Merrow, Liam Redmond ... Anthony Nicholls, Donald Pickering, T. P. McKenna, Frederic Abbott, Cyril Shaps, Terence Rigby, Martin Wyldeck, Arthur Gross, Katherine Schofield, Steven Brook, Jean Benedetti A respected Amsterdam gem cutter, Hendrik Jonkheer (Cyril Shaps), denies ever seeing a diamond (The Angel's Eye) owned by Lord Cranmore (Anthony Nicholls) whose son Jeremy (Donald Pickering) does not want the gem sold. NOTES: Cyril Shaps gets blown up in a helicopter as Dr. Bechmann in The Spy Who Loved Me.
79	8	"The Man Who Liked Lions"	18 November 1966
Guest cast: Peter Wyngarde, Suzanne Lloyd ... Michael Wynne, Jeremy Young, Michael Forrest, Ed Bishop, Peter Elliott, Niké Arrighi, Robert Russell, Steven Scott (2), Phyllis Montefiore A journalist's murder leads to a mystery in the shadow of ancient Rome. Before the journalist dies he apprises Simon of the "Man who likes Lions" and Simon finds a notebook with a list of significant dates and mysterious deaths including the father of Claudia Molinelli (Suzanne Lloyd). NOTE: James Bond Connection: Although well known for his role as Cmdr. Ed Straker on the Gerry Anderson Live-Action TV Series UFO, Ed Bishop was uncredited as a Straker-Like Hawaii CapCom officer in You Only Live Twice, and as Klaus Hergersheimer from G-Section, checking radiation shields, in Diamonds Are Forever.
80	9	"The Better Mousetrap"	25 November 1966
Guest cast: Alexandra Stewart, Madge Ryan, Ronnie Barker ... Arnold Diamond, Lisa Daniely, Patrick Whyte, Eddie Byrne (3), Michael Coles, Aimée Delamain, Marika Rivera, Pauline Collins, Alan Downer, Robert Bridges, Tom Macaulay, Vicky Hughes On holiday in the casinos of the Côte d'Azur, The Saint comes under suspicion when he always seems to be around during a spate of jewel thefts from luxury hotels along the French Riviera. Gay divorcee, Natalie Sheridan (Alexandra Stewart) attracts Simon's attention whilst Alphonse (Ronnie Barker) is a sub-Clouseau style detective. There is a "blink and you will miss it" attempt by Marie-Therese (Pauline Collins) to turn down a bed – which looks very untidy in the next scene!
81	10	"Little Girl Lost"	2 December 1966
Guest cast: June Ritchie, Noel Purcell ... Shay Gorman, Maurice Good, Edward Burnham, Colette Dunn, Leo Leyden, Gerry Duggan, Betty Cardno, Peter Ellis, Eve Belton, Kevin Flood Fishing quietly in Ireland a mystery blonde crashes a mini and is chased by two "heavies". The fishing lake and adjacent bridge looks very like Tyke's Water Lake and bridge near Elstree! The blonde reveals she is the daughter of Adolf Hitler and is being chased by the SS so needs protection, a story which Simon finds amusing and eventually "Mildred" (June Ritchie) reveals the far less exotic truth.
82	11	"Paper Chase"	9 December 1966
Guest cast: Ronald Hines, Penelope Horner, Niall MacGinnis ... Gordon Gostelow, Jack Gwillim (3), Carl Duering, Michael Beint, Steve Plytas, Anthony Wager, Norma West, John G. Heller, Hans De Vries, Paul Williamson, Gordon Sterne, Frank Maher, John Herrington, Carl Conway Major Carter (Jack Gwillim returning) joins Simon Templar at Wimbledon and persuades The Saint to follow a defecting civil servant, Eric Redman (Ronald Hines), who has been tricked into smuggling secret papers to East Germany. Redman has the intention of swapping the papers for his father whose assistant Hanya Linzt is portrayed by Penelope Horner. NOTE: Gwillim appeared in Thunderball.
83	12	"Locate and Destroy"	16 December 1966
Guest cast: John Barrie, Francesca Annis ... Julia Arnall, Victor Beaumont, Maurice Kaufmann, Alan Lake, Harry Landis, Simon Lack, Roger Delgado (2), Wolfe Morris, Andreas Malandrinos, Harvey Hall, Gordon Whiting, Katerina Holden, Richard Montez (5) Visiting an antique dealer in Lima, Peru, Simon thwarts the attempted kidnap of a local mine owner, Henry Coleman (John Barrie). However Coleman owns a painting which has been cleaned which excites the Saint's interest. Julia Arnall plays the owner's wife Ingrid whilst Francesca Annis is Maria the daughter of a local doctor and Roger Delgado is the Captain Rodriguez of the police. NOTE: Roger Delgado would gain more fame playing the first incarnation of The Master during Jon Pertwee's run as the Third Doctor on Doctor Who from 1970-74.
84	13	"Flight Plan"	23 December 1966
Guest cast: ... William Gaunt, Fiona Lewis, Imogen Hassall ... Ferdy Mayne, Jeremy Burnham, Tommy Duggan, Robert Crewdson, Marne Maitland, Salman Peer, Mary Jones, Donald Oliver, Ray Lonnen, David Spenser, Henry McGee, John Cazabon Reaching London Victoria station on the Golden Arrow, Simon Templar sees a strappy-sandalled nun (Imogen Hassall) attempting to drug a young lady, Diana (Fiona Lewis) whose brother Mike (William Gaunt), an RAF pilot, is not there to meet her. Mike has been recently cashiered and can fly the new Osprey VTOL jet aircraft. The part of the Osprey was played by a Hawker Harrier jump jet. NOTE: James Bond Connection: Marne Maitland played the role of Lazar who made the Gold Bullets for Francisco Scaramanga in The Man With The Golden Gun.
85	14	"Escape Route"	30 December 1966
Guest cast: John Gregson ... Wanda Ventham ... Ivor Dean, Donald Sutherland, Jean Marsh, Jeremy Burnham, Terry Yorke, Romo Gorrara, Vicki Wolf, Tony Doonan, Eric Mason, Edwin Brown, Walter Horsburgh, George Zenios; directed by Roger Moore The Saint stages a jewellery robbery and is given a ten year sentence at Princetown jail, Dartmoor, where he befriends John Wood (Donald Sutherland) who has links to a gang arranging prison escapes. Wanda Ventham is a nightclub singer, Penny Williams, and she spots where he hides the stolen diamonds. Ann (Jean Marsh) appears to be the gang's administrator.
86	15	"The Persistent Patriots"	6 January 1967
Guest cast: Edward Woodward ... Jan Waters, Judy Parfitt ... Richard Leech, Ivor Dean, Tenniel Evans, Mike Pratt, Patrick O'Connell, Nosher Powell, Michael Graham, Hugh Morton, Joseph Greig, Gil Sutherland, Eric Longworth The Saint's quick wits prevent the assassination of Jack Liskard (Edward Woodward) an African country Prime Minister seeking independence. Once in London Simon is engaged to assist Liskard whose wife, Anne (Judy Parfitt) is unaware of an earlier liaison between Liskard and Mary (Jan Waters) – and blackmail is threatened as some incriminating letters have surfaced.
87	16	"The Fast Women"	13 January 1967
Guest cast: Jan Holden, John Carson (4) ... Victor Maddern, Kate O'Mara, John Hollis, P.G. Stephens, Valerie Bell, Donald Morely, Patrick Durkin, Vilma Ann Leslie, Stan Jay, Harry Brunning, Mandy Mayer At Brands Hatch two racing drivers, Cynthia Quillen (Jan Holden) and Teresa Montesino (Kate O'Mara), both confide in Simon that they would wish to see the other lady dead so that they can win the race tomorrow and enabling Godfrey Quillen (John Carson) (whom the women love) to be faithful to one of them.
88	17	"The Death Game"	20 January 1967
Guest cast: Angela Douglas, Alan MacNaughtan ... George Murcell, John Steiner, Bernard Horsfall, Ivor Dean, Katherine Schofield, Stuart Cooper, Rick Jones, Michael Anthony, Karen Ford In a new craze university students are playing the "Death Game" dreaming up ever more ingenious methods of killing people and demonstrating how they might work. One of the psychology lecturers, Bill Bast (Bernard Horsfall) is concerned over the way the game is spreading and developing and through two students Jenny Turner (Angela Douglas) and Grey Wyler (John Steiner) targets the Saint who is even more interested when Bast is killed. NOTE: Look out for Bernard Horsfall as 007's ill-fated ally Campbell in On Her Majesty's Secret Service.
89	18	"The Art Collectors"	27 January 1967
Guest cast: Ann Bell, Peter Bowles ... Nadja Regin, Geoffrey Bayldon, James Maxwell, Philo Hauser, Richard Shaw, Garfield Morgan, Bryan Kendrick In Paris Natasha Ivanova (Ann Bell) has three previously unknown da Vinci paintings to sell and has contacted Marcel Legrand (Geoffrey Bayldon) – a dealer well known to Simon Templar. Peter Bowles is Serge who has an interest in the paintings. There are external shots of Stagenhoe Park, St Paul's Walden. NOTE: Regin was one of the few actresses to have appeared in two James Bond movies: as the mistress of Kerim Bey in From Russia With Love and a smaller appearance in the pre-credit sequence of Goldfinger.
90	19	"To Kill a Saint"	24 February 1967
Guest cast: Peter Dyneley (3), Annette Andre ... Derek Bond ... Francis Matthews, Robert Cawdron (5), John Serret, Pamela Ann Davy, Michael Bilton, Robert Gillespie, Victor Winding, Lawrence Davidson, Maggie Wright, Valerie Leon, Nita Lorraine Wandering around the bookstalls of Paris shots are fired at Simon Templar; evidence implies the involvement of night club owner Paul Verrier (Peter Dyneley) but the Saint is less sure and follows a mystery blonde (Annette Andre) who outwits him. Valerie Leon is one of three cousins providing Simon with an alibi when one is needed. Francis Matthews is Andre, business partner to M Verrier.
91	20	"The Counterfeit Countess"	3 March 1967
Guest cast: ... Kate O'Mara, Alexandra Bastedo ... Philip Madoc, Derek Newark, Ivor Dean, Henry Soskin, David Kelsey, Ray Brown, Gertan Klauber, Cliff Dickens, Terry Mountain A small plane crashing due to engine failure in a nearby field attracts the attention of Simon Templar, even more so when on inspecting the wreckage he finds a package containing a lot of money. The pilot reports events to Alzon (Philip Madoc) who in turn contacts a lady. Yvette Poulin, played by Kate O'Mara, is in "Mireille's" flat and when visited by Simon reports his visit to Alzon. Mireille is later found at work in a Paris nightclub and she is played by Alexandra Bastedo. NOTES: Gertan Klauber can be seen as Bubi in Octopussy followed by the fairground cafe owner in The Living Daylights, the latter uncredited.
92	21	"Simon and Delilah"	24 March 1967
Guest cast: Ronald Radd, Lois Maxwell, Suzanne Lloyd ... Guy Rolfe, Leon Greene, David Healy, Patrick Holt, John Collin, Ray Chiarella, Peter Birrel, David Nettheim, Gino Melvazzi, Vicky Hughes, Richard Montez (6) Visiting Rome Simon is invited by publicist Beth (Lois Maxwell) to watch the shooting of Samson and Delilah where the latter, Serena Harris (Suzanne Lloyd), is kidnapped by removing her trailer from the set. A ransom of $0.5m is requested for her return. Screenplay: C. Scott Forbes; Director: Roy Baker NOTE: James Bond Connection: The interactions between Roger Moore and Lois Maxwell in this episode attempt to prepare striking similarities as if it were James Bond and Miss Moneypenny.
93	22	"Island of Chance"	7 April 1967
Guest cast: Sue Lloyd, David Bauer (5), Patricia Donahue (2) ... Alex Scott, Milton Johns, Thomas Baptiste (2), Christopher Carlos, Norman Jones, Richard Owens, Kenneth Gardnier, Danny Daniels, Tommy Eytle, Charles Hyatt In the British West Indies Simon Templar meets a chemist, Frank Cody (Richard Owens), he has known for ten years and is currently employed by Dr Charles Krayford (David Bauer). Cody is murdered almost immediately and the events are captured by photo-journalist Marla Clayton (Sue Lloyd). Both Clayton and Templar now have an interest in Krayford's medical researches. Screenplay: Leigh Vance; Director: Leslie Norman NOTE: James Bond Connections: David Bauer would play separate characters in You Only Live Twice and Diamonds Are Forever. Norman Jones portrayed Chris, the unfortunate astronaut who gets his breathing cord cut by the enemy capsule in the pre-titles of You Only Live Twice. A reference to James Bond concerning Gold is answered by Vargas (Milton Johns) when interrogated by Simon Templar (Roger Moore); the quote, "Goldfinger gave it back. He got it from Fort Knox", referring to Auric Goldfinger.
94	23	"The Gadget Lovers"	21 April 1967
Guest cast: Mary Peach ... Campbell Singer (2), Glynn Edwards, Nicholas Donnelly, John Bennett, Burt Kwouk, Vernon Dobtcheff, Wolf Frees, Maurice Browning, Stephen Hubay, Peter Burton, Stefan Gryff, Trudi Neilsen In a Berlin nightclub Simon Templar averts an assassination attempt on Fenton (Campbell Singer) of British Intelligence. It would appear that various Russian agents are being killed by gadgets which they are being supplied with but the manufacture is too sophisticated for it to be of Russian origin. Travelling to Paris, Simon meets Colonel Smolenka (Mary Peach) and they become allies to investigate the deaths, giving Simon the opportunity to introduce the Colonel to some decadent Western behaviour. Glynn Edwards (of Minder fame) appears as a trigger happy Russian "heavy". NOTE: James Bond Connections: What could have been... Peter Burton played Major Boothroyd in Dr. No, basically Q. He was unable to return for From Russia With Love and so Desmond Llewelyn became synonymously known for the part. Vernon Dobtcheff portrayed the character Max Kalba in The Spy Who Loved Me.
95	24	"A Double in Diamonds"	5 May 1967
Guest cast: Cecil Parker, Anton Rodgers, Yolande Turner ... Ivor Dean, Ilona Rodgers, Ferdy Mayne, Howard Goorney, Jack Woolgar, The Graham Twins, John Clive, Yvette Herries, Tim Barrett, Alan Haywood, Pauline Clifford, Brian Harrison The death of a jeweller, Charlie Hallowes (Jack Woolgar) and the simultaneous mysterious disappearance of a replica of the Gillingham Necklace leads on Simon Templar on a merry chase as members of the Gillingham family and their staff seek to convert the real necklace into cash to meet the family's debts. Lord Gillingham (with a soft G) is played by Cecil Parker, secretary Kate by Yolande Turner and Anton Rogers is designer Pierre, although the designs came from Norman Hartnell.
96	25	"The Power Artists"	19 May 1967
Guest cast: Pauline Munro, George Murcell, Ivor Dean ... Tristam Jellinek, Peter Bourne, John Bown, John J. Carney, George Roubicek, Alan Haywood, Anthony Dawes, Charles Rea, Tommy Godfrey, Michael Pemberton, Caron Gardner, Charlotte Selwyn, John Bull, Edward Higgins This episode opens with Simon Templar being dropped by a cabbie (Tommy Godfrey) in Painter Street, Chelsea and being told that he can find some adventure on the top floor of number 54 where he should ask for Perry Loudon (Peter Bourne). Before too long there is a death and a helpful downstairs neighbour Cassie Lane (Pauline Munro). A previous villain has been planning the Saint's downfall for some time. NOTE: Caron Gardner was one of the actresses of The Pussy Galore's Flying Circus, or simply Flying Circus, in Goldfinger.
97	26	"When Spring Is Sprung"	2 June 1967
Guest cast: ... Toby Robins, Ann Lynn, Allan Cuthbertson, Ivor Dean ... George Pastell (3), Gary Watson, Harvey Ashby, Douglas Livingstone, Bryan Mosley, Eric Dodson, Les Crawford, Peter Brace, Doel Luscombe, Kenneth Edwards, Colin Rix, Leslie Anderson, John Frawley British Secret Service in the form of Col Hannerley (Alan Cutherbertson) wants Simon Templar to organise the defection of spy, John Spring (Gary Watson), acting for the Russian Secret Service. Spring's wife, Marie (Ann Lynn) also seeks the Saint's assistance in freeing her husband. Bryan Mosley (later joining Coronation Street as Alf Roberts) is a rain coat wearing sleuth following the Saint. NOTE: Pastell played a train conductor in 1963's From Russia with Love.
98	27	"The Gadic Collection"	22 June 1967
Guest cast: Peter Wyngarde, Georgia Brown ... Michael Ripper, Martin Benson, André van Gyseghem, Nicole Shelby, Hedger Wallace, Henry Soskin, Paul Darrow, Geoff Cheshire, Anne Tirard, Andreas Malandrinos, Bakshi Prem In deference to modern sensitivities this episode is excluded from the regular ITV4 showings of the colour episodes of The Saint almost certainly due to Peter Wyngarde as Turen, who is wearing blackface makeup. Set in Istanbul, Simon Templar seeks to discover how and why there are photographs of the Gadic collection being circulated despite restrictions on the use of cameras in the museum where it is stored and normally maintained. NOTE: Geoff Cheshire acted as Toussaint, thug to Marc Ange Draco in On Her Majesty's Secret Service.

=== Series 6: 1968–69 ===
No. overall	No. in series	Title	Original release date
99	1	"The Best Laid Schemes"	29 September 1968
Guest cast: Sylvia Syms, Paul Daneman ... Gabrielle Drake, Norman Bird, Fulton Mackay, John Tate, Godfrey Quigley, Francis de Wolff, Olive Milbourne, Jonathan Elsom, Fredric Abboott, Geoffrey Lumsden, John Ringham, Joanne Dainton, Erik Mason Diana (Gabrielle Drake) is walking her dog along the beach when she finds a man's body whom she can identify from his rings as her uncle; her screams bring the Saint to comfort her and to discover the truth, after the coroner records an Open Verdict. Sylvia Syms plays Arlene Flemming, the widow of Captain Flemming. Fishing boat scenes are set in Lowestoft.
100	2	"Invitation to Danger"	6 October 1968
Guest cast: Shirley Eaton (3), Robert Hutton, Julian Glover ... Bryan Marshall, Charles Houston (4), Warren Stanhope (3), Les Crawford, Ros Drinkwater, Dennis Chinnery; directed by Roger Moore Reb Denning (Shirley Eaton) benefits from a lucky dice throw by the Saint at a London Casino, but fares less well when attacked in the underground car park, except that Simon Templar is able to prevent hurt as he has followed her and naturally then drives her to a "party" to which she has been invited. Inside Reb vanishes and Simon becomes a prisoner.
101	3	"Legacy for the Saint"	13 October 1968
Guest cast: ... Ivor Dean ... Alan MacNaughtan, T. P. McKenna, Reginald Marsh, Stephanie Beacham, Kenneth Farrington, Edward Brayshaw, Bruce Boa, Brian Coburn, Sheila Keith, Edward Kelsey Ed Brown (Reginald Marsh), a retired gangster, dies when his Rolls-Royce explodes. Charlie Lewis (Alan MacNaughtan), Ed's business partner, asks Simon to travel to Switzerland to break the news to Ed's daughter, Penny (Stephanie Beacham). Ed has recorded his will on film, which sets four rival gangsters at each other's throats. Writer: Michael Winder. Director: Roy Ward Baker.
102	4	"The Desperate Diplomat"	20 October 1968
Guest cast: ... Ivor Dean, Robert Hardy, Suzan Farmer (4) ... John Robinson, David Cargill (2), Kenneth Gardnier, Lorna Wilde, Leslie Crawford, Terry Plummer, Maggie London, Charlotte Selwyn, Yutte Stensgaard, Brian Harrison Jason Douglas (John Robinson) and Simon were involved in an African terrorist campaign, and the former has gone on the run from an African country with $0.75m of US aid money, possibly hiding in Switzerland. Douglas has a daughter, Sara (Suzan Farmer), and following a visit from Simon she unwisely chooses the car of Walter Faber (Robert Hardy) to take her to the police – but instead she is kidnapped. A Sinclair Micromatic Radio is used to provide a link between the captors and the Saint.
103	5	"The Organisation Man"	27 October 1968
Guest cast: ... Tony Britton ... Caroline Mortimer, Glynn Edwards, Norman Bird, John Collin, Simon Lack, Mark Dignam, Terence Edmond, Tony Caunter, Douglas Ditta Jonathan Roper (Tony Britton) has a mercenary army sourced from the best across the world, and which is being trained to high standards by Leander (Glynn Edwards) and Cable (John Collin). The Saint has to prove his competence by murdering Spode (Norman Bird). A pub called Battle Axes in Borehamwood is staffed by Kate Barnaby (Careoline Mortimer) to maintain a link with Simon once he has infiltrated the mercenaries, and is unsurprised by his sudden appearance. Tony Caunter, as Mason, is finding it hard to maintain the requisite standards.
104	6	"The Double Take"	3 November 1968
Guest cast: ... Gregoire Aslan ... Kate O'Mara, Denise Buckley, Blake Butler, Michael Robbins, June Abbott, Michael Mellinger, Martin Wyldeck, Geoffrey Morris, Rose Alba, Anne Godfrey, Michael Pemberton, Iain Blair In transit to Beirut, Simon changes planes in Athens, only to be intercepted by Annabel to meet her employer, Eugene Patroclos (Gregoire Aslan). Mr Patroclos has an unbelievable story that he is being impersonated by a doppelganger who is undermining his business activities and wrecking his deals as well as undertaking a number of illegal activities shipping drugs and weapons. The Saint is encouraged to return to London where he visits Fleet Street for information from the journalist Pat Hurst (Michael Robbins).
105	7	"The Time to Die"	10 November 1968
Guest cast: ... Suzanne Lloyd ... Maurice Good, John Barfcroft, Terence Rigby, Freddie Jones, Monica Grey, Linda Marlowe It appears that someone wants the Saint dead! First, a harmless snake is left in his car, and then a car is driven at him. Mary Ellen Brent (Suzanne Lloyd), a journalist, is with Simon for the first of these attacks, and she is now penning an article on "The Saint and the Secret Slayer". Simon has a list of those recently released from prison whom he had a hand in sending down.
106	8	"The Master Plan"	17 November 1968
Guest cast: ... John Turner ... Lyn Ashley, Burt Kwouk, Christopher Benjamin, Robert Morris, Paul Greenhalgh, James Locker, Brenda Kempner, Leslie Anderson, Edwin Brown, Prudence Drage At a noisy West End night club, the Saint and Jean Lane (Lyn Ashley) are searching for her brother Tony (Paul Greenhalgh), who has been missing for three days. The club owner, Cord Thandrel (John Turner), does not want to answer difficult questions, and he drugs Simon -- which means he can imprison Simon and Jean at the back of the club. Fish (Christopher Benjamin) is a somewhat dubious antiques dealer with links to Thandrel's illicit business activities.
107	9	"The House on Dragon's Rock"	24 November 1968
Guest cast: Anthony Bate, Annette Andre ... Mervyn Johns, Alex Scott, Glyn Houston, Richard Owens, Talfyn Thomas, Heather Seymour, Anthony Blackshaw, David Garfield, Daffyd Havard, Peter Lawrence, Reg Pritchard; directed by Roger Moore With quite a few establishing shots in Wales, it feels less studio-bound, and the story also marks a diversion into science fiction territory for The Saint, who is investigating the disappearance of a shepherd, Owen Thomas (Talfryn Thomas), who reappears with a torn coat and lash marks on his chest. The local residents think it is the supernatural, but a nearby research establishment run by Dr. Sardon (Anthony Bate) and his assistant and niece Carmen Grant (Annette Andre) is also raising suspicion.
108	10	"The Scales of Justice"	1 December 1968
Guest cast: ... Andrew Keir, Jean Marsh, Mark Burns ... Gillian Lind, John Barron, Geoffrey Chater, Ronald Leigh-Hunt (3), Victor Maddern, John Boxer, Brian Badcoe, Leon Cortez, John Crocker, Edward Harvey, Clifford Parrish, Dorothea Phillips The Directors of Combined Holdings are being murdered after receiving a postcard warning that they are next, and five of them have died in five months. Gilbert Kirby (Andrew Keir) receives a card indicating that he is next – on the day on which he becomes Lord Mayor of London. The Saint works with Gilbert Kirby's daughter Anne (Jean Marsh) to protect him during the day. Victor Maddern appears as Jim Cowdry, valet and driver to Sir John Mulliner.
109	11	"The Fiction Makers: Part I"	8 December 1968
Guest cast: Sylvia Syms, Justine Lord, Kenneth J. Warren ... Philip Locke, Tom Clegg, Nicholas Smith, Roy Hanlon, Peter Ashmore, Caron Gardner, Frank Maher, Graham Armitage, Lila Kaye, Joe Gibbons, Roy Boyd, Anthony Blackshaw, Shaun Curry, Vincent Harding, Richard Franklin, Ralph Ball, Oswald Laurence, David Rendall, Richard Davies, Ian Kingly Although originally edited and shown as two episodes, this is not included in the ITV4 reruns of The Saint. The writer Amos Klein (Sylvia Sims) has written some interesting plots and they have been spotted by Warlock (Kenneth J. Warren), who wants to enter a highly secret and secure complex, Hermetico, using names and characters based on the fiction of Klein plus the skills of the author to ensure a perfect break-in and escape. Due to mistaken identities, Warlock thinks that the Saint is the author and she is merely his secretary.
110	12	"The Fiction Makers: Part II"	15 December 1968
See previous episode.
111	13	"The People Importers"	22 December 1968
Guest cast: ... Neil Hallett, Susan Travers, Gary Miller, Ray Lonnen, Salman Peer, Imogen Hassall, Nik Zaran, Joan Newell, Michael Robbins, Ron Pember, Julian Sherrier, Jeremy Anthony Harry (Michael Robbins) has taken Simon Templar on an angling expedition when a 30ft motor boat passes them dangerously close. The only catch by the anglers is a dead body dropped from the boat as it passed. However some of the other illegal immigrants are unwell and the van transporting them has an accident leading to the capture of many of the individuals. The man recently deceased was working for the Pakistani High Commission in London. NOTE: Appearing uncredited in Thunderball as the Vulcan Bomber pilot was Neil Hallett.
112	14	"Where the Money Is"	29 December 1968
Guest cast: ... Kenneth J. Warren, Judee Morton, Sandor Elès, Derek Newark, Warren Stanhope (4), John Savident, Tony Wright (3), Jane Bates; directed by Roger Moore Simon Templar is tempted into a car with $1000 and a glamorous girl who take him to meet Ben Kersh (Kenneth J. Warren) who offers him even more money – to prevent his daughter, Jenny (Judee Morton), from being killed. Kersh treats his assistant / office boy, Arnie Garnett (Warren Stanhope) quite badly.
113	15	"Vendetta for the Saint: Part I"	5 January 1969
Guest cast: Ian Hendry ... Rosemary Dexter, Aimi Macdonald ... George Pastell (4), Marie Burke (4), Finlay Currie, Fulton Mackay ... Alex Scott, Peter Madden, Anthony Newlands (3), Guy Deghy (4), Edward Evans (2), Eileen Way, Peter Kristof, Steve Plytas, Agath Angelos, Gábor Baraker, Steven Berkoff, Hal Galili, Charles Houston (5), Gertain Klauber, Richard Montez (7), Malya Nappi, Salmaan Peer, Derek Sydney, Ernst Walder First of a two-part episode based on the novel, Vendetta for the Saint. In a nightclub in Naples Simon witnesses a meeting between "Dino Cartelli" (Ian Hendry) and James Euston (Fulton Mackay), former colleagues at a bank who were once close friends. The subsequent death of Euston means the Saint commences an investigation into Al Destamio (Ian Hendry), who resides on Capri, where Simon is met by Lily (Aimi MacDonald) in a bright red MG. Later in Sicily Simon is driving the same bright red MG!
114	16	"Vendetta for the Saint: Part II"	12 January 1969
See previous episode.
115	17	"The Ex-King of Diamonds"	19 January 1969
Guest cast: ... Stuart Damon, Ronald Radd ... Isla Blair, Willoughby Goddard, Paul Stassino (5), Jeremy Young, Anthony Stamboulieh, Alan Rowe, Jacky Allouis, Carol Friday, Derek Smee, Araby Lockhart, Hugh Morton, Les White Arriving in Nice, Simon is approached by a man who hands over a bright yellow open top Rolls-Royce. The story is very much secondary to the interplay between the Saint and Rod Huston (Stuart Damon – one of the Champions) as a test of the format which would apply to the forthcoming show The Persuaders! with which many of the team would be involved. The ex-King of Slavonia (Willoughby Goddard) is keen to win at cards tonight to pay for a revolution; Henri Flambeau (Ronald Radd) and his daughter Janine (Isla Blair) need to pay the bills whilst others just want to win big!
116	18	"The Man who Gambled with Life"	26 January 1969
Guest cast: ... Clifford Evans ... Jayne Sofiano, Veronica Carlson, Steven Berkoff, Valentine Palmer, John D. Collins, Iain Blair, Barry Andrews, Hedger Wallace, James Vallon, Geoffrey Lumsden, Brian Tully, David Kelsey, Barry Stanton Enjoying a somewhat solitary champagne picnic, the Saint is handed a box containing a mouse, Mimi, by a blonde and a number of men dressed as undertakers. He returns home to find a coffin containing a wax dummy of himself and another blonde, Stella (Jayne Sofiano), who is the sister of Vanessa (Veronica Carlson). They are working with their father Keith Longman (Clifford Evans) to persuade Simon that death is not inevitable.
117	19	"Portrait of Brenda"	2 February 1969
Guest cast: ... Anna Carteret, Ivor Dean ... Anne De Vigier, Trevor Bannister, Petra Davies, Marne Maitland, Hazel Coppen, Tina Ruta, Larry Taylor, David Prowse, Harry Littlewood Simon Templar finds the body of artist Alan Williams in his flat and a cryptic message relating to the late Brenda Stafford, Alan's sister. A phone call takes the Saint to a recording studio where singer Diane Huntley (Anna Carteret, much later Juliet Bravo) takes him to meet a guru (Marne Maitland).
118	20	"The World Beater"	9 February 1969
Guest cast: ... Patricia Haines, John Ronane, James Kerry, George A. Cooper, Eddie Byrne (4), William Wilde, Rosemary Donnelly, Reg Whitehead, Anthony Sheppard, Clifford Earl, Bernard G. High Testing a racing car built by George Hapgood (James Kerry), Simon has an accident when the brakes fail – as a result of deliberate damage. His cousin Justin Pritchard (John Ronane) and Kay Collingwood (Patricia Haines) have a competing car. Which one will win the prize -- and for whose "company" will Simon drive?
