= On Approval =

On Approval may refer to:

- On Approval (play), a 1926 play by Frederick Lonsdale
- On Approval (1930 film), a British comedy film directed by and starring Tom Walls based on the play
- On Approval (1944 film), a British comedy film directed by Clive Brook based on the play
- On Approval (1964 film), an Australian TV play based on the play
