= The Long Sunset (play) =

1955 play by R. C. Sherriff

The Long Sunset is a 1955 play by English writer R. C. Sherriff. It is set in AD 410, at the end of the Roman occupation of Britain. The play was inspired by Sherriff's love of history, and in particular by the excavation of the Roman villa at Angmering in West Sussex, which he bankrolled and participated in during the late 1930s and early 1940s. The first two years of the excavations were supervised by Leslie Scott.

The play premiered as a radio play on the BBC in April 1955, followed by its stage premier at the Birmingham Repertory Theatre later that year.

== Versions ==
Following the two 1955 productions, the play was filmed by the BBC in 1958. An Australian television film adaptation was made in 1963. The play also broadcast on Australian radio that same year (1963). BBC Radio 4 broadcast a version in 1971.

== 1955 BBC radio play ==
The play was first broadcast, its world premiere, on Saturday 23 April 1955, at 21:15 on the BBC Home Service Basic. It was produced by Ayton Whitaker. The description when the play was rebroadcast in August that year is "The scene is Julian's house near Richborough in A.D. 410."

=== Cast ===
- Narrator: John Gabriel
- Marcus, a Roman officer: Philip Cunningham
- Lugar, a servant: James Thomason
- Serena, Julian's wife: Avice Landone
- Paula, Julian's daughter: Monica Grey
- Julian, a Roman living in Britain: Brewster Mason
- Otho, Julian's son: Aubrey Woods
- Friends of Julian: Fortius: George Merritt
- Friends of Julian: Lucian: Harcourt Williams
- Arthur, a soldier of fortune: Joseph O'Conor
- Gawaine, Arthur's nephew: Richard Bebb

== 1955 theatre play ==
The play had its first stage performance at the Birmingham Repertory Theatre, running from 30 August to 24 September 1955. The play was directed by Bernard Hepton and designed by Finlay James.

=== Cast ===
- Arthur, a soldier of fortune: Geoffrey Taylor
- Gawaine, Arthur’s nephew: Oliver Neville
- Julian: Kenneth Mackintosh
- Lucian, wealthy neighbouring landowner: Ronald Hines
- Lugar, a servant: Eric Jones
- Marcus, a Roman officer: Michael Robbins
- Otho, son of Julian and Serena: Alan Rowe
- Paula, daughter of Julian and Serena: Doreen Aris
- Portius, wealthy neighbouring landowner: Redmond Phillips
- Serena, Julian’s wife: Nancie Jackson

== 1958 BBC television play ==
This television adaptation of the play was first broadcast on Sunday 17 August 1958 at 20:00 on BBC Television, in the Sunday Night Theatre slot. It was produced by Harold Clayton and designed by Fanny Taylor. The description is "The action takes place in Julian's house on the Kentish downs. Time: A.D. 410."

=== Cast ===
- Marcus, a Roman officer: Ronald Leigh-Hunt
- Lugar, a servant: Ralph Nossek
- Serena, Julian's wife: Margaretta Scott
- Paula, their daughter: Jennifer Graham
- Julian, a Roman living in Britain: Michael Gwynn
- Otho, their Son: Anthony Valentine
- Wealthy landowners, friends of Julian: Portius: Redmond Phillips
- Wealthy landowners, friends of Julian: Lucian: Frederick Leister
- Arthur, a soldier of fortune: Richard Leech
- Gawaine, his nephew: John King
- Servant: Audrey Foat
- Servant: Delia Paton

== 1963 Australian (ABC) television play ==
This version was written by Noel Robinson and directed by Colin Dean. It was first broadcast on ABC on 27 November 1963.

=== Cast ===
- Julian Severus: Henry Gilbert
- Serena Severus: Lynne Murphy
- Arthur, leader of a band of Britons: James Condon
- Julian's son Otho: John Bell
- Paula: Sandra Gleeson
- Gawaine: Tim Cohen
- Lugar: Guy le Claire
- Portius: Ronald Morse
- Lucian: Richard Parry
- Marcus: John Faassen

== 1971 BBC radio play ==
This radio version of the play was first broadcast on Saturday 10 April 1971 at 20:30 on BBC Radio 4 FM, in the Saturday Night Theatre slot. It was produced by Martin Jenkins. The description is "The Roman Empire is crumbling; the occupation of Britain is at an end: the Legions are leaving: the surviving Romans are alone and unprotected. The play follows the fate of one such Roman family, from their attempts to fight off the invading Saxons, to their final conversion to Christianity. Place: somewhere in Southern England. Time: AD 410."

=== Cast ===
- Marcus, a Roman tribune: John Rye
- Julian, a Roman landowner: Stephen Murray
- Serena, his wife: Pauline Letts
- Paula, their daughter: Jane Knowles
- Otho their son: David Spenser
- Lucian: Lockwood West
- Portius: John Gabriel
- Arthur: Julian Glover
- Gawaine, his nephew: David Valla
- Lugar, a servant: Edward Kelsey
