= The Long Sunset =

The Long Sunset may refer to:

- The Long Sunset (play), a 1955 play by R. C. Sherriff
- The Long Sunset (film), a 1963 Australian television film, based on the play
