= List of science fiction television programs, E =

This is an inclusive list of science fiction television programs whose names begin with the letter E.

== E ==
Live-action

- Earth 2 (1994–1995)
- Earth 2100 (2009, special, docufiction)
- Earth: Final Conflict (1997–2002)
- Earth Star Voyager (1988, pilot, film)
- Earth vs. the Spider (2001, film)
- Edge of Darkness (1985, UK)
- Eerie, Indiana (franchise):
  - Eerie, Indiana (1991–1992)
  - Eerie, Indiana: The Other Dimension (1998)
- Eleventh Hour (franchise):
  - Eleventh Hour (2006, UK)
  - Eleventh Hour (2008–2009)
- Emerald Soup (1963, UK)
- Encrypt (2003, film)
- Eon Kid aka Iron Kid (2006–2008, South Korea/Spain, animated)
- Escape from Jupiter (1994, Australia)
- Éternelle (2009, France, miniseries)
- Eureka (2006–2012)
- Event, The (2010–2011)
- Exo-Man (1977) IMDb
- Expanse, The (2015–2022)
- Extant (2014–2015)
- Extinct (2017)

Animated

- Element Hunters (2009–2010, Japan, animated)
- Ergo Proxy (2006, Japan, animated)
- Eureka Seven (2005–2006, Japan, animated)
- Evil Con Carne (2003–2004, animated)
- Excel Saga (1999–2000, Japan, animated)
- Exosquad (1993–1994, animated)
- Exception (2022, Japan, animated)
- Extreme Dinosaurs (1997, animated)
