= Emma Blair =

Emma Blair may refer to:

- Emma Helen Blair (1851–1911), United States historian
- Iain Blair (1942–2011), Scottish actor and author who wrote romantic fiction using the pen name Emma Blair
