= Split level =

Split level may refer to:

- Split Level (band), an Irish Christian rock band active 1986–2000
- Split Level (TV play), a 1964 Australian TV play
- A split-level home
- A split level bus
- A bilevel rail car
