= Flowering Cherry =

Australian play and television film

The Flowering Cherry is a 1958 play written by Robert Bolt.

The play was performed on Broadway in 1959.

== Plot ==
In an English household, the father dreams of giving up his job selling insurance to run an apple orchard, the mother dreams of him giving up his dreams, and the two children have problems of their own .

== Adaptations ==
The play was adapted for British television in 1963.

== 1963 Australian TV adaptation ==
Flowering Cherry
- Based on: play by Robert Bolt
- Written by: Noel Robinson
- Directed by: Colin Dean
- Country of origin: Australia
- Original language: English

Production
- Producer: Colin Dean
- Running time: 75 mins
- Production company: ABC

Original release
- Network: ABC
- Release: 13 February 1963 (Melbourne, Sydney)
- Release: April 1963 (Brisbane)

It was filmed for Australian TV in 1963, directed by Colin Dean and starring Grant Taylor, Peter Adams, Don Pascoe, Elizabeth Ferris, Margo Lee, Frank Taylor and Rosalind Seagrave.

It was the first drama to be simultaneously presented in Sydney, Canberra and Melbourne via coaxial cable.

=== Plot ===
A man abandons his life as a clerk to start an orchard. His dreams of fulfilment are linked to his memories of growing up in Somerset.

His wife decides to leave him.

=== Cast ===
- Grant Taylor as Mr Cherry
- Margo Lee as Isobel Cherry
- Rosalind Seagrave as Judy
- Peter Adams as Tom
- Frank Taylor
- Elizabeth Ferris
- Don Pascoe

=== Production ===
The production was filmed in Sydney.

At the time Grant Taylor was appearing on stage with Googie Withers in Woman in a Dressing Gown.

Elizabeth Ferris who made her acting debut was a diving champion whose name was linked romantically to Murray Rose.

=== Reception ===
The TV critic for the Sydney Morning Herald thought "Grant Taylor was well in command" of his role but that Colin Dean's production "was rather too crowded."

Val Marshall of the Sunday edition of the same paper called it "a first rate production" in which Taylor and Lee were "brilliant".

The Bulletin wrote that "Given a stronger plot, livelier dialogue, less stagey sets, more imaginative cameras, some television actors, and better make-up, it could have been a good play. Lacking them, it was still tolerable, because the viewer could feel that at least everyone was trying, and that is not a bad beginning for ABC drama production in 1963."

== See also ==
- Robert Bolt § Plays for more information
