= The Tilted Screen =

1966 television play

The Tilted Screen is a 1966 British television play in the Armchair Theatre anthology series produced by ABC Weekend TV for the ITV network written by Noel Robinson) and directed by Bill Bain, both Australian as were the actors. The plot concerns an Australian man who marries a Japanese woman.

== Cast ==
- Fredric Abbott as Morrie
- Yoko Tani as Michiko
- Brian Anderson as Billo
- Georgie Sterling
- Reg Lye
- Terence Donovan
