= Bill Bain (director) =

Australian television and film director

- Born: Allen William Bain; 18 December 1929; Wauchope, New South Wales, Australia
- Died: 22 February 1982 (aged 52); London, England
- Occupations: Director, Producer
- Years active: 1959–1982

Allen William Bain (18 December 1929, Wauchope, New South Wales, Australia – 21 February 1982, London, England), known as Bill Bain, was an Australian television and film director.

== Biography ==
=== Australia ===
Bill Bain originally trained as a school teacher, but became a pioneer of Australian television after he joined the fledgling Australian Broadcasting Corporation in the 1950s.

In Australia, he directed the country's first TV pantomime for Christmas in 1959. He also directed the TV plays Corinth House (1961) and Funnel Web (1962).

=== Britain ===
He left Australia in 1963 for Europe and directed numerous episodes of British television series, including Harpers West One, Emerald Soup, The Avengers, Callan, Redcap, Upstairs Downstairs, The Duchess of Duke Street, Enemy at the Door, The Brack Report, and Armchair Theatre.

It was noteworthy that "For many, Upstairs, Downstairs and The Duchess of Duke Street typify excellence in British television drama. The leading director for both series was Bill Bain, an Australian".

For Amicus he directed a feature film What Became of Jack and Jill?. Bain called the film "a savage indictment of the shallow education young people get today." Another 'one off' was a TV adaptation of a Noël Coward short story called Pretty Polly in which he directed Lynn Redgrave. On location in Sri Lanka, he directed an episode of the 1973 Australian-British-German series Elephant Boy based on the Rudyard Kipling story Toomai of the Elephants.

Bain returned to Australia briefly in 1973 where he lamented the quality of local television. He came back in 1975 to attempt to set up a $1 million feature about opal mining.

Bain won an Emmy Award in 1975 for Outstanding Directing in a Drama Series for his work on the Upstairs, Downstairs episode "The Sudden Storm". In 1979, he returned to Australia for three months to be a consultant at the Film and Television School. In 1968, he married the British actress Rosemary Frankau and they had two sons Matthew and Sam Bain.

He died in St Stephens Hospital in London, aged 52, from melanoma.

== Select filmography ==
- Corinth House (1961)
- Harlequinade (1961)
- The Little Woman (1962)
- Fly by Night (1962)
- Funnel Web (1962)
- Emerald Soup (1963)
- The Tilted Screen (1966)
- The Importance of Being Earnest (1968)
- All Out for Kangaroo Valley (1969)
- What Became of Jack and Jill? (1972) - feature
