= Corinth House =

1961 Australian TV movie

- Advertisement from SMH 15 Feb 1961
- Based on: the play by Pamela Hansford Johnson
- Written by: Bill Bain
- Directed by: Bill Bain
- Country of origin: Australia
- Original language: English

Production
- Running time: 60 mins
- Production company: ABC

Original release
- Network: ABC
- Release: 15 February 1961 (Sydney)
- Release: 15 March 1961

Corinth House is a 1961 Australian TV movie based on the play by Pamela Hansford Johnson and directed by Bill Bain. It was sold overseas.

It was the ABC's first live drama of 1961.

== Plot ==
Set in a private hotel in London. One of its residents is Miss Malleson, a retired headmistress living out the rest of her days. She is visited by an ex pupil, Madge Donnythrope, who sixteen years earlier Miss Malleson disciplined publicly. Madge is determined to get revenge on the headmistress by convincing others she is insane.

== Cast ==
- Enid Lorimer as Miss Malleson
- Diana Perryman as Madge Donnythorpe
- Gwen Bevan as Mrs. Beauclerc, the manageress
- Ida Newton as Miss Figgis
- Gwen Plumb as Mrs. Heysham
- Hugh Stewart as Major Shales
- Audrey Teesdale as Nora, the maid

== Reception ==
The Australian Woman's Weekly called it "excellent".

The Sydney Morning Herald said "The outstanding and positive thing about this play is its utter suitability to the medium of television" starring "two actresses of exceptional power."

== See also ==
- List of television plays broadcast on Australian Broadcasting Corporation (1960s)
