= The Fighting Cock =

- Ad in The Age 18 Sep 1963
- Written by: Noel Robinson
- Directed by: William Sterling
- Country of origin: Australia
- Original language: English

Production
- Running time: 75 minutes
- Production company: ABC

Original release
- Release: 18 September 1963 (Melbourne)
- Release: 25 September 1963 (Sydney)

The Fighting Cock is a 1963 Australian television play. It is an adaptation of a play by Jean Anouilh whose original French title was L'Hurluberlu. In English, it had a run on Broadway, starring Rex Harrison.

It was made at a time Australian drama was relatively rare.

== Premise ==
A postwar general tries to escape everyday realities by retreating into fantasy.

== Cast ==
- Alexander Archdale as the general
- Malcolm Shield as the General's son Toto
- Felicity Young as general's wife Algae
- Sandra Power as Sophie
- Elizabeth Wing as Bise
- Williams Lloyd as Father Gregory
- Kendrick Hudson as doctor
- Roly Baree as Baron
- Hugh Stewart as Lebulluc
- Laurence Beck as Mendigales
- Frank Rich as Michepain

== Reception ==
The Sydney Morning Herald called it "a thoroughly successful production" with a "virtuoso" performance from Alexander Archdale.
