= On Approval (play) =

1926 play by Frederick Lonsdale

Mrs Wislack pulls the Duke's nose: 1927 West End production

On Approval is a 1926 play by Frederick Lonsdale. It premiered at the Gaiety Theatre, New York, on 18 October 1926 where it ran for 96 performances. It opened in the West End of London at the Fortune Theatre on 19 April 1927 and ran until 2 June 1928.

== Original casts ==
Role	New York, 1926	London, 1927
Richard Halton	Wallace Eddinger	Edmond Breon
Mrs Wislack	Violet Kemble-Cooper	Ellis Jeffreys
Helen Hayle	Kathlene MacDonell	Valerie Taylor
The Duke of Bristol	Hugh Wakefield	Ronald Squire

== Plot summary ==
Richard Halton and Mrs Wislack, 1927 West End production

The exacting and difficult Maria Wislack is a widow who decides to take Richard away to her Scottish island for a month's trial "on approval" to see if they are compatible for possible marriage. The egotistical and difficult Duke of Bristol (who is Richard's friend) contrives to be there as well. While there they meet Helen, who is in love with the Duke, and circumstances make all four of them stay on the island for the month. Because of the bad behaviour of Mrs Wislack and the Duke, Helen and Richard decide not to marry either of them and they leave them stranded on the island. The Duke and Mrs Wislack pretend to be romantically involved to make the other two jealous, but end up marrying each other instead.

== Adaptations ==
On Approval has had the following adaptations:

- On Approval, a 1930 British comedy film directed by and starring Tom Walls, also featuring Yvonne Arnaud, Winifred Shotter and Robertson Hare.
- On Approval, a 1944 British comedy film starred Clive Brook, Beatrice Lillie, Googie Withers and Roland Culver. Brook not only starred, but also directed, produced and wrote the adaptation.
- On Approval, a 1964 Australian TV film.
- A BBC television adaptation in 1947 featured Jan Pilbeam (Helen), Avice Landone (Mrs Wislack), Alec Finter (Richard) and Howieson Culff (Duke).
- "On Approval", a 1980 episode of the BBC anthology series Play of the Month. This version features Penelope Keith, Jeremy Brett, Lindsay Duncan, and Benjamin Whitrow.
