= The Long Sunset (film) =

1963 film by Colin Dean

- Genre: historical
- Based on: The Long Sunset by R.C. Sheriff
- Written by: Noel Robinson
- Directed by: Colin Dean
- Music by: Richard Connolly
- Country of origin: Australia
- Original language: English

Production
- Running time: 60 mins
- Production company: ABC

Original release
- Network: ABC
- Release: 27 November 1963 (Sydney, live)
- Release: 4 December 1963 (Melbourne, taped)
- Release: 11 December 1963 (Brisbane)

The Long Sunset is a 1963 Australian television film based on the 1955 play of the same name by R.C. Sheriff. It starred John Bell and was directed by Colin Dean It was recorded live.

The play had been filmed by the BBC in 1958.

== Plot ==
A Roman family during the last days of Roman Britain. Julian Severus lives near Canterbury when he hears the Romans are abandoning Britain.

== Cast ==
- Henry Gilbert as Julian Severus
- Lynne Murphy as Serena Severus
- James Condon as Arthur, leader of a band of Britons
- John Bell as Julian's son Otho
- Sandra Gleeson as Paula
- Tim Cohen as Gawaine
- Guy le Claire as Lugar
- Ronald Morse as Portius
- Richard Parry as Lucian
- John Faassen as Marcus

== Production ==
It was filmed in Sydney. The designer was Douglas Smith.

"It's not hard to see parallels with modern situations," said director Colin Dean. "Alaric's encroachment on Rome in the fifth century AD is not without its modern counterparts."

Lynne Murphy and Henry Gilbert previously played husband and wife in The Outcasts, John Bell had been in Ballad of One Gun. It was the TV debut for Sandra Gleeson.

The play also broadcast on Australian radio in 1963.

== Reception ==
The critic from the Sydney Morning Herald wrote that "the gingerly stiffness of dialogue and manner that seems to overcome most dramatists and actors when they are playing at history was seldom absent from the" production. He felt that the characters in the original play "are in any case incorrigible cardboard, but Colin Dean's production, despite a few visual ingenuities, seemed to emphasise rather than minimise their creaking unreality. The Romans either intoned phrases of hollow nobility and stoicism or were querulous and fearful; their British allies in the fight against the encroaching Saxons merely slouched and growled. None of them was more than spasmodically interesting." The critic felt Gilbert "seemed to be taking part in a very slow and stately pageant" while Condon was "conscientiously surly and thicktongued" while Bell and Faassen "were largely wasted in dull parts." The critics felt "the play would have seemed better if the performance had shown more evidence of the sort of rehearsal that allows actors to develop characterisations as well as merely learn lines and moves, but even with devoted attention it is not likely to have much more in its favour than the romance of its historical idea."

The Age said Gilbert was "most convincing" and that the play "opened impressively" then "floundered with the Roman settlers left to their own devices" but "concluded with a compelling marshalling of dramatics."

Filmink said "It’s extremely watchable entertainment, John Bell fans will get a major kick out of it, and Australian dramatisations of Ancient Rome have definite novelty value."

== See also ==
- List of television plays broadcast on Australian Broadcasting Corporation (1960s)
