= Sharpe's Honour (TV programme) =

- Based on: Sharpe's Honour by Bernard Cornwell
- Screenplay by: Colin MacDonald
- Directed by: Tom Clegg
- Starring: Sean Bean; Daragh O'Malley; Hugh Fraser; Michael Byrne; Alice Krige; Féodor Atkine
- Country of origin: United Kingdom
- Original language: English

Production
- Running time: 101 minutes

Original release
- Network: ITV
- Release: 8 June 1994

Related
- Sharpe's Enemy; Sharpe's Gold

Sharpe's Honour is a 1994 British television drama, the fifth of a series screened on the ITV network that follows the career of Richard Sharpe, a fictional British soldier during the Napoleonic Wars. It is based on the 1985 novel of the same name by Bernard Cornwell.

== Plot ==
In 1813, Napoleon is reeling from his disastrous invasion of Russia the year before, and Lord Wellington is preparing to drive the French out of Spain. Richard Sharpe is mourning the death of his wife Teresa.

Sharpe's archenemy, French Major Ducos, proposes a plan to Napoleon to split the alliance between Spain and England (and gain revenge on Sharpe). He has a French spy, la Marquesa, write a letter to her Spanish husband, a colonel in the Spanish army, claiming that Sharpe tried to force himself on her. The colonel demands a duel. Sharpe obliges, but Wellington's men stop it before Sharpe kills the colonel. Later that night, while he is sleeping, the Spaniard has his throat cut by El Matarife, a partisan leader. Sharpe is framed for the murder and sentenced to hang. To placate his Spanish allies, Wellington pretends to go along with the execution. However, Major Nairn, Wellington's spymaster, arranges for another condemned soldier to be executed as Sharpe, keeping spectators at a distance to hide the substitution.

He sends Sharpe and Sergeant Harper to find out what is going on. Meanwhile, Father Hacha and his brother El Matarife, Ducos' co-conspirators, abduct la Marquesa, imprison her in a nunnery, and steal her great wealth. Sharpe learns of this and frees her, only to be chased by El Matarife and his men.

Sharpe is captured by a French patrol and taken to Ducos, while la Marquesa starts back to France with her French lover. Ducos gloats as he tells Sharpe that his duel and the murder of the nobleman has made it possible to negotiate a vital peace treaty with King Ferdinand VII of Spain; the British Army will be forced to leave the country. Harper and the rest of Sharpe's "chosen men" infiltrate the French prison in disguise and rescue their commander. Ducos escapes. Sharpe and his men play a pivotal role in the British victory at the Battle of Vitoria.

After their defeat, the French retreat in complete disarray. In his frantic attempt to force his way through his own men, Ducos is hauled from his horse by angry French soldiers and shot, with his peace treaty papers being scattered to the wind. El Matarife recaptures la Marquesa and her fortune, but is found by Sharpe. Sharpe goads El Matarife into a duel, beating him and forcing him to confess everything in front of Spanish and British witnesses. El Matarife then tries to stab Sharpe in the back, but is shot by the Spanish major who witnessed the original duel.

== Cast ==
- Sean Bean as Sharpe
- Daragh O'Malley as Harper
- Hugh Fraser as Wellington
- Michael Byrne as Nairn
- Alice Krige as La Marquesa
- Féodor Atkine as Ducos
- Nickolas Grace as Father Hacha
- Michael Mears as Cooper
- John Tams as Hagman
- Jason Salkey as Harris
- Lyndon Davies as Perkins
- Ron Cook as Napoleon
- Matthew Scurfield as El Matarife
- Diana Perez as Ramona
- Ricardo Vélez as Mendora
- Jay Benedict as Verigny
- James Saxon as Vaughan
- Anna Savva as Mother Superior
- Mark Burns as Pakenham
- Christopher Owen as Rev Whistler
- Ricardo Montez as Father Sanchez
- Benjamin Soames as Trumper Jones

Michael Byrne would leave the series after this episode. He was replaced by Hugh Ross playing a different spymaster.

== Historic discrepancies ==
As with any period production, it is not possible to create a production that is entirely accurate. One of the more evident discrepancies is that at Shapes Duel with El Matarife, snow begins to fall, which is highly improbable even in the Pyrenees in the direct aftermath of the Battle of Vitoria, which took place on 21 June.
