= All Out for Kangaroo Valley =

1969 BBC TV The Wednesday Play

- The Wednesday Play episode
- Episode no.: Season 9 Episode 6
- Directed by: Bill Bain
- Written by: Noel Robinson
- Original air date: November 5, 1969

"All Out for Kangaroo Valley" is a British TV movie about Australians living in London, aired on BBC1 (as part of The Wednesday Play anthology series) on 5 November 1969.

The play was reportedly controversial.

== Plot ==
Robbo arrives from Australia with his fiancée Jan. They meet his cousin Col, who introduces them to Liz.

== Cast ==
- Sandra Gleeson as Jan
- Mark Edwards as Robert
- Kerry Francis as Nev
- Vivienne Lincoln as Carol
- David Gilchrist as Jim
- Warwick Sims as Colin
- Betty McDowall as Liz
- Peter Arne as Peter Steiner
- Joanne Dainton as Emma Steiner
- Brian Harrison as Joe
- Cassandra Harris
