= Split Level (TV play) =

1964 Australian TV play

- Written by: Noel Robinson
- Directed by: Ken Hannam
- Country of origin: Australia
- Original language: English

Production
- Producer: Dick Cohen
- Running time: 60 mins
- Production company: ABC

Original release
- Network: ABC
- Release: 7 October 1964 (Sydney)
- Release: 14 October 1964 (Melbourne)

Split Level is a 1964 Australian TV play directed by Ken Hannam and written by Noel Robinson. It aired on 7 October 1964 and was shot in Sydney at ABC's Gore Hill Studios.

Australian TV drama was relatively rare at the time.

== Plot ==
Stephanie is married to architect Mike. They live in a house on Sydney's north with their two children. Stephanie hears gossip that an old school friend of hers, Rosemary, has been having an affair, leading to the end of her marriage. Over the course of the day, Stephanie realises that the man Rosemary has been seeing is Mike.

== Cast ==
- Diana Davidson as Stephanie Stewart
- Leonard Teale as Mike Stewart
- Jacki Weaver as Hilary
- Elizabeth Pusey as Keith
- Barbie Rogers as Rosemary
- Ruth Cracknell as Alison, wife of Mike's business partner
- Judi Farr as Vonnie, a friend of Stephanie's
- Winifred Green as Mrs Stewart
- Eve Wynne as Mrs Conlon
- Julianna Allan as Carol
- Muriel Hopkins as Mrs Brooke
- Joan Morrow as Janet
- Max Phipps as Louis
- Pat Hill
- Joan Winchester
- Leonard Bullen
- Jonathon Constable

== Production ==
The original title was A Day in the Sun and The Woman Who Has Everything. Jack Montgomery was the designer.

It was Noel Robinson's first original script produced for TV, although she had done a number of adaptations. Director Ken Hannam said "this is the best constructed TV play to come to me from a local author. I have no doubt Miss Robinson will become a most important writer in the next few years."

== Reception ==
According to the Sydney Morning Herald "as an exercise in how to make a very small amount of plot fill out an hour of television drama" the play "was technically a success" but "left a good deal to be desired" being "a soap opera transposed to the upper social scale with a faintly intellectual flavour of play-readings, feature walls and flower arrangements." The critic allowed that director Hannam "extracted welcome liveliness from plenty of scene and camera angle changes, and thus at least kept the eye busy even when the mind tended to wander."

Filmink wrote "It’s a simple script, one of details and observations rather than heavy conflict, but all grounded in truth... it is a very well-realised television play and a tribute to the skill of Noel Robinson, a writer that should be better known."
