= Emerald Soup =

1963 British children's sci-fi TV series

- Genre: Children's television, science fiction
- Written by: Martin Woodhouse
- Directed by: Bill Bain
- Starring: William Dexter, Janina Faye
- Country of origin: United Kingdom
- No. of episodes: 7

Production
- Producer: Bill Bain
- Running time: 30 minutes
- Production company: ABC Weekend TV

Original release
- Network: ITV
- Release: 9 November – 21 December 1963

Emerald Soup is a 1963 British children's science fiction television series directed by Bill Bain and produced by ABC Weekend TV for the ITV network. It was written by Martin Woodhouse, with Norman Bogner as script editor. Comprising seven 25-minute episodes, the series aired weekly from Saturday 9 November to Saturday 21 December 1963. The broadcast timing of series conflicted in part with the initial episodes of the BBC series Doctor Who, also broadcast on Saturdays, which started on 23 November 1963.

== Synopsis ==
The series was set in a small rural community, where a group of local children discovers, constructed in the vicinity, a laboratory that is conducting secret radiation tests. The children attempt to stop the tests before any damage to the environment can be done.

== Cast ==
- Jessica Spencer as Jessica Maxwell
- William Dexter as John Maxwell
- Janina Faye as Jo Maxwell
- Karl Lanchbury as Gally Lloyd
- Gregory Phillips as Tim Maxwell
- Annette Andre as Penny Dalton
- Michael Bangerter as Poynte
- Ethel Gabriel as Mrs Evans
- Allan McClelland as Gaunt
- Frederic Abbott as Lee
- Blake Butler as Pascoe
