= Colin Dean =

Australian producer and director

Colin Dean (1919-2007) was an Australian producer and director who worked in Australian TV in the 1950s and 1960s.

He worked in the UK in the late 1940s, and returned to Australia in the 1950s.

== Select credits ==
- The Queen in Australia (1954)
- Lady in Danger (1959)
- Stormy Petrel (1960) (TV series)
- The Patriots (1962) (TV series)
- The Case of Private Hamp (1962)
- Flowering Cherry (1963)
- The Long Sunset (1963)
- The Hungry Ones (1963) (TV series)
- The Purple Jacaranda (1964) (TV series)
