= Noel Robinson (writer) =

Australian writer

Noel Robinson (born 1928 in Melbourne) is an Australian writer of many television and radio plays in the 1960s. Split Level (1964) was her first original screenplay. Filmink called her "a writer who should be better known." She moved to London where she worked for over a decade.

== Credits ==
=== TV plays ===
- My Three Angels (1962)
- The Fighting Cock (1963)
- The Long Sunset (1963)
- Split Level (1964)
- A Man for All Seasons (1964)
- On Approval (1964)
- The Late Edwina Black (1964)
- Romanoff and Juliet (1964)
- A Time to Speak (1965)
- The Tower (1965)
- The Big Killing (1965)
- The Weather House (1965)
- The Tilted Screen (1966)
- A Cup of Tea with the Fullers (1967)
- Dr. Finlay's Casebook (1967)
- All Out for Kangaroo Valley (1969)
- The Fall of Edward Barnard (1969)
- The Tea Leaf (1969)
- ITV Playhouse (1970)
- Menace (1970)
- Brother and Sister (1970)
- The Bridesmaid (1970)
- Mrs Davenport (1970)
- The Shopper (1971)
- Concussion (1971)
- Before Paris (1972)
- The Liberation of Eileen (1974)
- Second Partner (1974)
- Sam's Luck (1980)
- Self Portrait is the Stereo Play (1986)
- Sun on the Stubble (1996)

=== Radio plays ===
- A Man of No Great Future (1960)
- An Infinite Debt (1960)
- An Invitation to Dinner (1963)
