= Redmond Phillips =

New Zealand actor and writer (1912–1993)

- Redmond Phillips in England c. mid 1950s
- Born: Redmond Bernard Phillips; 5 June 1912; Reefton, New Zealand
- Died: 3 November 1993 (aged 81); Sydney, New South Wales, Australia
- Education: Victoria University of Wellington
- Occupations: Actor, writer
- Years active: early-1930s-1991

Redmond Bernard Phillips (5 June 1912 – 3 November 1993) was a New Zealand actor of theatre, television and film, and also a radio writer and playwright, who worked in his native country, as well as in England and Australia.

== Early life ==
Phillips was born in Reefton, New Zealand and began acting in the theatre while a student at Victoria University of Wellington.

== Career ==
Phillips performed with the New Zealand Players theatre troupe, after moving to Sydney, Australia he joined Doris Fitton's pioneering Independent Theatre group in 1940 and wrote material for radio star Jack Davey. During the Second World War he served as a staff sergeant with the Entertainment Unit of the Australian Army for which he also wrote material.

He moved to Britain in 1948 where he became a successful character actor in the theatre, working with the Nottingham Playhouse, the Birmingham Repertory Theatre and the Royal Shakespeare Company.

From 1957 he started acting for television and appeared in many series such as Maigret, Danger Man, The Saint and The Avengers and in several plays produced by the BBC.

In 1968 he returned to Sydney and continued performing on stage with the Old Tote Theatre Company. He remained active in television playing roles in many series and was part of the regular cast of Spyforce playing the ruthless Colonel Cato.

== Filmography ==
=== Film ===
Year	Title	Role	Notes
1958	The Golden Disc	1st Recording Manager	Feature film
1958	A Night to Remember	Mr. Hoyle	Feature film
1959	Naked Fury	Inspector Stevens	Feature film
1959	Left Right and Centre	Mr. Smithson	Feature film
1959	Blind Date	Police Doctor	Feature film
1960	The Angry Silence	Ambulance Driver	Feature film
1960	There Was a Crooked Man	Padre	Feature film
1960	The Criminal	Prison Doctor	Feature film
1963	Love Is a Ball	Starcy	Feature film
1963	Tom Jones	Lawyer Dowling	Feature film
1964	The Gorgon	Hans	Feature film
1971	Demonstrator	Sir David Crawford	Feature film
1978	Little Boy Lost	Canon Pritchard	Feature film
1980	The Earthling	Bobby Burns	Feature film
1983	With Prejudice	Judge Nagle	Feature film
1983	Hostage	Priest	Feature film
1983	Now and Forever	Judge	Feature film
1983	Phar Lap	Sir Samuel Hordern	Feature film
1984	Razorback	Magistrate	Feature film
1985	Burke & Wills	Commissioner May	Feature film

=== Television ===
Year	Title	Role	Notes
1960	The World of Tim Frazer	Donald Edwards	TV series
	Maigret		TV series
	Danger Man		TV series
	The Saint		TV series
	The Avengers		TV series
1963	The Human Jungle	Langford	TV series
1971-73	Spyforce	Colonel Cato	TV series
1972	Snake Gully with Dad and Dave	Mayor	TV series
1975	Scattergood: Friend of All		TV series

== Theatre ==
=== As actor ===
Year	Title	Role	Venue / Theatre Co.
1940	The Importance of Being Earnest		Independent Theatre, Sydney
1941	The Life of the Insects		Independent Theatre, Sydney
1947	The Country Wife	Dorilant	Metropolitan Theatre, Sydney
1947	As You Like It	Le Bleu	Metropolitan Theatre, Sydney
1947	Lady Windermere's Fan	Lord Augustus Norton	Metropolitan Theatre, Sydney
1947	No Room at the Inn		Minerva Theatre, Sydney
	Henry VI, Part 1	Vernon / Clerk of Chatham / Louis XI / Keeper	The Old Vic, London and Birmingham Repertory Theatre with Birmingham Repertory Company
1949	The Rivals		Nottingham Playhouse
1951	Thieves’ Carnival	Sergeant / Town Crier	Birmingham Repertory Theatre with Birmingham Repertory Company
1951	Princess of Pandemonia	Mandelbaum, Jeweller	Birmingham Repertory Theatre
1951	The Rent Day	Hyssop	Birmingham Repertory Theatre
1951	The Wild Duck	Balding gentleman	Birmingham Repertory Theatre
1951	Oliver Twist		Birmingham Repertory Theatre
1951-53	Henry VI, Part 2	Clerk of Chatham / Simcox	Birmingham Repertory Theatre & The Old Vic, London
1951-53	Henry VI, Part 3	Keeper / Louis XI	The Old Vic, London & Birmingham Repertory Theatre with Birmingham Repertory Company
1952	Sherlock Holmes		Birmingham Repertory Theatre
1952	A Penny for a Song		Birmingham Repertory Theatre
1952	Point of Departure	The Manager	Birmingham Repertory Theatre
1952	South Wind		Birmingham Repertory Theatre
1952	Abraham Lincoln		Birmingham Repertory Theatre
1952	A Month in the Country		Birmingham Repertory Theatre
1952	Emmy		Birmingham Repertory Theatre
1952-53	The Tinder Box	Kufuffle	Birmingham Repertory Theatre with Birmingham Repertory Company
1953	Miser		Birmingham Repertory Theatre
1953	The Boy David	Jesse	Birmingham Repertory Theatre
1953	The Critic		Birmingham Repertory Theatre
1953	Henry IV, Part 1	Shepherd, father to Joan / Vernon of the White-Rose or York faction	Birmingham Repertory Theatre & The Old Vic, London
1954	The Private Life of Helen Eteoneus		Birmingham Repertory Theatre
1954	The Moon in the Yellow River		Birmingham Repertory Theatre
1954	Tartuffe	Tartuffe	Birmingham Repertory Theatre
1954	Pericles		Birmingham Repertory Theatre
1954	Carrington, V.C.	Bombardier Owen	Birmingham Repertory Theatre
1954	Murder Will Speak		Birmingham Repertory Theatre
1955	The Silver Curlew	King Nollekens of Norfolk	Birmingham Repertory Theatre
1955	Noah		Birmingham Repertory Theatre
1955	You Never Can Tell		Birmingham Repertory Theatre
1955	The Enchanted		Birmingham Repertory Theatre
1955	Richard II	Edmund of Langley	Birmingham Repertory Theatre
1955	The Long Sunset	Portius	Birmingham Repertory Theatre
1955	Beauty in the Wood		Birmingham Repertory Theatre
1955	Caste		Birmingham Repertory Theatre
1954	Yellow Sands		Birmingham Repertory Theatre
1956	Salad Days		His Majesty's Theatre, Auckland
1956	The Queen and the Rebels		His Majesty's Theatre, Auckland
1957	Slave of Truth		Birmingham Repertory Theatre
1957	Sganarelle		Birmingham Repertory Theatre
1957	The Beaux' Stratagem	Scrub	Birmingham Repertory Theatre
1957	Lizard on the Rock	Arthur Canbery	Birmingham Repertory Theatre
1958	The Potting Shed	Father William Callifer	Globe Theatre & Theatre Royal, Brighton
1960	Anna Christie	Chris Christoferson	Oxford Playhouse with Meadow Players Ltd
1961-62	Much Ado About Nothing	Leonato	Royal Shakespeare Theatre with Royal Shakespeare Company
1961-62	Hamlet	Polonius	Royal Shakespeare Theatre with Royal Shakespeare Company
1961-62	Richard III	Lord Stanley	Royal Shakespeare Theatre with Royal Shakespeare Company
1961-62	As You Like It	Duke	Royal Shakespeare Theatre with Royal Shakespeare Company
1964	The Successor		Bristol Old Vic – Theatre Royal
1966	Crack in the Ice		Birmingham Repertory Theatre
1966	The Life of Galileo		Birmingham Repertory Theatre
1968	Breath of Spring		Independent Theatre, Sydney
1969	Hadrian VII		Her Majesty's Theatre, Melbourne
1969	Halfway Up the Tree	Vicar	Theatre Royal, Sydney
1973	The Dragon, The Donkey and The Nightingale	The Emperor	Bailey Hall, Sydney
1975	The Male of the Species		Comedy Theatre, Melbourne, Her Majesty's Theatre, Adelaide, Elizabethan Theatre
1976	Saturday Sunday Monday		Independent Theatre, Sydney
1976	The Shoemaker's Holiday	Sir Roger Otley	Sydney Opera House Drama Theatre
1977	The Magistrate	Mr Bullamy	Sydney Opera House Drama Theatre
1977	The Alchemist	Tribulation Wholesome	UNSW Parade Theatre
1977	The Ultimate Obscenity		UNSW Parade Theatre
1977	The Time Is Not Yet Ripe	An English Butler	Sydney Opera House Drama Theatre
1978	What Every Woman Knows	Charles Venables	Marian Street Theatre
1980	The Merry Wives of Windsor	Robert Shallow || Sydney Opera House Drama Theatre	
1981	You Never Can Tell	William	Marian Street Theatre
1982	The Importance of Being Earnest	Lane	Marian Street Theatre

=== As crew ===
Year	Title	Role	Venue / Theatre Co.
1957-58	School	Adaptation / lyrics	Birmingham Repertory Theatre & Princes Theatre, London with Birmingham Repertory Company

== Radio ==
Year	Title	Role
1987	The Man Who Wanted to Murder Sherlock Holmes	Sir Arthur Conan Doyle
