= Ricardo Montez =

Gibraltarian actor (1923–2010)

- Montez as 'Juan Cervantes' in Mind Your Language
- Born: Levy Isaac Attias; 20 September 1923; Gibraltar
- Died: 26 October 2010 (aged 87); Marbella, Spain
- Other name: Ricardo Montez
- Occupation: Actor
- Years active: 1962–2008

Ricardo Montez (born Levy Isaac Attias; 20 September 1923 – 26 October 2010) was a Gibraltarian actor. He was best known for his role as the Spanish bartender Juan Cervantes, a student in Jeremy Brown's EFL class in the ITV sitcom Mind Your Language and one of four students (along with Giovanni Cupello, Anna Schmidt, and Ranjeet Singh) to appear in all four series.

== Life and career ==
Montez was born Levy Isaac Attias on 23 September 1923 in Gibraltar to Gibraltarian Jewish parents. He and his family were evacuated to England during World War II. On returning to Gibraltar, he worked in different jobs, including as an extra in films. While appearing in the British film Wonderful Things! (1958), the actor Frankie Vaughan persuaded him to travel to London and become an actor, which he did in 1962, changing his name at Vaughan's suggestion to Ricardo Montez. He appeared primarily in television programmes, including The Saint, The Avengers, Doctor at Sea and Don't Drink the Water, in which he usually played Spanish characters. He was sometimes credited as Richard Montez.

Montez's most famous role was as 'Juan Cervantes', the moustachioed Spaniard in the diverse international class of mature English-language learners, in the ITV sitcom Mind Your Language (1977–1979; revived in 1986). In his later years, he continued to appear on television in programmes including Sharpe's Honour and Casualty, as well as in commercials. Montez’s final acting role was as 'Stavros' in the 2008 film Mamma Mia!.

== Personal life ==
Montez lived in the suburb of Richmond in London. He used to visit Gibraltar twice a year. He married Orivida Hatchwell in 1953; they had a daughter, Clara, and a granddaughter, Sara. Montez died from cancer at his daughter's home in Marbella, Spain on 26 October 2010, at the age of 87.

== Selected credits ==
=== Film ===
- The Girl Hunters (1963) - Skinny Guy (as Richard Montez)
- 633 Squadron (1964) - New Zealand Pilot at Casino (uncredited)
- Maroc 7 (1967) - Pablo (as Richard Montez)
- Carry on in the Legion (1967) - Riff at Abdul's Tent (uncredited)
- The Magnificent Two (1967) - Revolutionary (uncredited)
- Don't Raise the Bridge, Lower the River (1968) - Arab (as Richard Montez)
- Vendetta for the Saint (1969) - Nino (as Richard Montez)
- A Talent for Loving (1969) - Bandit (uncredited)
- 11 Harrowhouse (1974) - 2nd Manager (uncredited)
- Are You Being Served? (1977) - Revolutionary (uncredited)
- Incognito (1997) - Juan Del Campo
- Mamma Mia! (2008) - Stavros (final film role)

=== Television ===
- Crane (1963) - Omar
- The Plane Makers (1963) - Mr. Prato
- Man of the World (1962-1963) - Driver / Garcia / Miguel
- ITV Play of the Week (1964) - Airport official
- No Hiding Place (1964) - Bruno Brunone
- Detective (1964) - Jose
- The Rat Catchers (1966) - Tutor
- The Avengers (1967) - Colonel Josino
- Man in a Suitcase (1967-1968) - Guard / Police Officer / Spanish Taxi Driver
- The Saint (1962-1969) - Carlos Segoia / Guieseppe / Head Waiter
- The Champions (1969) - Detective
- From a Bird's Eye View (1971) - Spanish Sergeant
- UFO (1971) - 2nd Mexican Bandit
- The Persuaders! (1972) - Inspector Santos
- Jason King (1972) - Garcia
- Barlow at Large (1973) - Henry Rivera
- Doctor at Sea (1974) - Barman
- The Top Secret Life of Edgar Briggs (1974) - Zammit
- Don't Drink the Water (1974-1975) - Doctor / Jose
- The Onedin Line (1976) - Buckle
- Doctor on the Go (1977) - Mr. Valentini
- The Likes of Sykes (1980)
- The Jim Davidson Show (1981)
- Duty Free (1984) - Pedro
- Never the Twain (1991) - Miguel
- Sharpe's Honour (1994) - Father Sanchez
- Mind Your Language (1977-1986) - Juan Cervantes
- Casualty (2001-2002) - Gerald Kirby / Xavier
- Auf Wiedersehen, Pet (1986-2004) - Fuentes / Ofelia's Grandfather

=== Writing credits ===
- Freewheelers
