= Trust the Saint =

1962 book by Leslie Charteris

- First UK edition
- Author: Leslie Charteris
- Language: English language
- Series: The Saint
- Genre: Mystery, Short Stories
- Publisher: The Crime Club (US); Hodder & Stoughton (UK)
- Publication date: 1962
- Publication place: United Kingdom
- Media type: Print (hardback & paperback)
- Preceded by: The Saint to the Rescue
- Followed by: The Saint in the Sun

Trust the Saint is a collection of short stories by Leslie Charteris that originally appeared in The Saint Mystery Magazine and was first published in October 1962 by The Crime Club in the United States and by Hodder and Stoughton in the United Kingdom. This was the 35th book to feature the adventures of Simon Templar, alias "The Saint", and was published around the time the character began to receive wide recognition through the TV series The Saint starring Roger Moore as Templar.

== Stories ==
The book consisted of 6 stories:

1. The Helpful Pirate
2. The Bigger Game
3. The Cleaner Cure
4. The Intemperate Reformer
5. The Uncured Ham
6. The Convenient Monster

== Television adaptations ==
Two stories from this collection were later adapted as episodes of the 1962-69 TV series, The Saint.

"The Helpful Pirate" and "The Convenient Monster" aired back-to-back during the fifth season, airing on 28 October and 4 November 1966 respectively.

== Reprints ==
- "The Convenient Monster" was one of a handful of stories in the Saint canon that crossed over into the realm of fantasy, and was reprinted in the December 1965 edition of The Magazine of Fantasy and Science Fiction.
