= On Approval (1944 film) =

- Directed by: Clive Brook
- Written by: Clive Brook (adaptation); Terence Young
- Based on: On Approval; 1926 play by Frederick Lonsdale
- Produced by: Clive Brook; Sydney Box (executive producer)
- Starring: Beatrice Lillie; Clive Brook; Googie Withers; Roland Culver
- Narrated by: E. V. H. Emmett
- Cinematography: C. Friese-Greene
- Edited by: Fergus McDonell
- Music by: William Alwyn
- Production company: Independent Producers
- Distributed by: General Film Distributors
- Release date: 25 February 1944 (London)
- Running time: 80 minutes
- Country: United Kingdom
- Language: English

On Approval is a 1944 British romantic comedy film, produced, directed and cowritten by Clive Brook. The film stars Brook, Beatrice Lillie, Googie Withers and Roland Culver. It is the second film adaptation of the play On Approval by Frederick Lonsdale; the first was a 1930 film of the same name.

In writing the screenplay, Brook remained close to Lonsdale's play but changed its timeframe from the early 1920s to the late Victorian era, when the concept would have been much more shocking.

== Plot ==
In a comedic documentary-style prologue, the current war conditions in England are contrasted against life in 1939 and during the Victorian era.

George, 10th Duke of Bristol, and his friend Richard Halton are poverty-stricken members of the British upper class. George has squandered his money on women. They attend a party at George's London home, which has been let to the young, wealthy and attractive American Helen Hale. At the soiree, George is rude to Maria Wislack, a rich widow with whom he is acquainted. Richard is genuinely in love with Maria, but will not tell her so because of his poverty. George is oblivious to the fact that Helen is in love with him, and finds the thought of marriage distasteful. Maria grows tired of waiting for Richard to make his feelings known and proposes that they spend a month together as man and wife in Scotland "on approval" to see how they fare. George, much to their discomfort, invites himself along. They are soon joined by Helen.

The unexpected arrival of additional—and unmarried—guests disturbs Mrs. McCosh, Maria's housekeeper, and she soon departs, taking with her all of the household servants. The two couples are left to fend for themselves. Richard tries to please the demanding Maria, but Helen privately advises him to tell her to "go to hell." George, in the meantime, loafs and does nothing to help.

At the end of three weeks, Maria tells Richard that she is willing to marry him and even to settle £5,000 per year on him, but when he discovers that what he had thought was a test of his patience is actually the way in which she behaves normally, he rejects her. At the same time, George decides that he loves Helen and asks her to marry him. She would have been happy to accept his proposal three weeks earlier, but after becoming better acquainted with him, she recommends that he marry the more compatible Maria instead. Helen has long felt sympathy, but begins to feel an attraction toward Richard and suggests that they leave Maria and George alone together in the otherwise deserted house. George and Maria declare a truce, and George suggests that they attract their respective love interests by pretending to be in love with each other. Helen and Richard depart in the only boat. Richard leaves a note containing one word: "Ho!"

Helen and Richard have nightmares about George and Maria together alone in Maria's house. They row back to the house in the middle of the night, but no one comes to the door in response to the bell. When Richard climbs to Maria's bedroom window, she is frightened and rushes to George's room. Helen and Richard find them together there.

In a flashforward scene, Helen is showing the family photo album to her two sons. The narrator addresses her as Lady Bristol, but she corrects him. She has married Richard, while George, to the narrator's disbelief, is with Maria.

== Cast ==
- Beatrice Lillie as Maria Wislack
- Clive Brook as George, 10th Duke of Bristol
- Googie Withers as Helen Hale
- Roland Culver as Richard Halton
- O. B. Clarence as Doctor Graham
- Laurence Hanray as Parkes
- Elliott Mason as Mrs. McCosh
- Hay Petrie as Hotel manager
- Mollie Munks as Jeanne
- Marjorie Rhodes as Cook

On Approval is one of few films featuring Lillie, often called "The Funniest Woman in the World" for her eccentric personality and portrayals in many comedic stage plays and revues.

== Reception ==
Observing that On Approval “is more like the work of human beings than you usually get today in films,” critic Manny Farber wrote in The Nation:

This drawing-room farce about Victorians manages by amiability and a talented light touch to make its people and their half-assed lives quite lovable…The film doesn’t have the slightest look of modern movie design, which is a good thing. It is thoroughly secure in its kidding, indifferent as to whether or not it is killing its audience—which it isn’t—and shows an awareness of the possibilities for achieving humor by a precocious use of the medium.

Filmmaker Lindsay Anderson called the film "the funniest British light comedy ever made" (according to the DVD box).

== Legacy ==
On Approval was the "dark horse" of the 2014 edition of the Turner Classic Movies Film Festival. The first screening of On Approval, held at the TCL Chinese Theatre in Hollywood on the first full day of the festival, was a sell-out prompting a second showing at the Chinese on the final day of the festival (which also sold out). The two screenings were introduced by film historian Jeffrey Vance, who also recorded an audio commentary track for the Blu-ray edition of the film.

== Sources ==
- Farber, Manny. 2009. Farber on Film: The Complete Film Writings of Manny Farber. Edited by Robert Polito. Library of America. ISBN 978-1-59853-050-6
