= Ronald Hines =

British actor (1929–2017)

- 1970s publicity photo
- Born: Ronald Charles Andrew Hines; 20 June 1929; London, England, England
- Died: 28 March 2017 (aged 87); Midhurst, West Sussex, England
- Occupation: Actor

Ronald Charles Andrew Hines (20 June 1929 – 28 March 2017) was a British television actor. He had a lengthy career, but possibly his most prominent roles were as Henry Corner in three of the four series of Not in Front of the Children, and as William Cecil in Elizabeth R.

After graduating from RADA in 1950, Hines started on stage at Stratford, and made many theatrical appearances throughout his career, including at the Royal Court, the Old Vic and the National Theatre.

On television, he starred in the 1959–60 sitcom Tell It to the Marines. In 1965 he was a regular on the first series of the BBC oil industry drama The Troubleshooters (then titled Mogul). In 1966, Hines played Eric Redman in the 11th episode of the 5th series of the popular British action adventure The Saint (episode entitled "Paper Chase"). He also appeared on Jackanory several times, usually narrating stories about The Wombles.

Hines appeared as John Copeland in the crime drama series The Professionals (episode "The Acorn Syndrome") in 1980. In 1988 he played Home Secretary Henry Matthews in the TV film Jack the Ripper, which starred Michael Caine. He portrayed Hoofd Commissaris Samson in Thames Television's Amsterdam-set detective series Van der Valk (1991–92).

He also appeared in a number of films, starting with Dunkirk, in 1958 and finishing with Rough Cut, in 1980. All his subsequent screen roles were on television rather than in films.

Hines died in Midhurst, West Sussex, England, on 28 March 2017, at the age of 87.

== Select filmography ==
Year	Title	Role	Notes
1958	Dunkirk	Miles	
1958	The Two-Headed Spy	German Corporal	
1960	Sink the Bismarck!	Officer on Bridge of 'Prince of Wales'	Uncredited
1960	The Angry Silence	Ball	
1961	House of Mystery	Young husband	
1961	Whistle Down the Wind	P.C. Thurstow	
1961	Echo of Barbara	Mike Roscoe	
1963	The Informers	Geoff Lewis	
1963	The Hi-Jackers	Jim Brady	
1964	Séance on a Wet Afternoon	Policeman Outside Clayton's	
1966	The Saint	Redman	TV series, 1 episode
1971	Elizabeth R	William Cecil (Lord Burghley)	TV mini-series, 5 episodes
1972	Young Winston	Adjutant	
1972	Dead of Night	Frank Pullar	TV series, 1 episode
1973	Take Me High	Sam	
1980	Rough Cut	Capt. Small	
1980	Shoestring, The Farmer Had a Wife	David Mortimer	TV series, 1 episode
1988	Jack the Ripper	Henry Matthews	
1990	Poirot, The Kidnapped Prime Minister	Sir Bernard Dodge	TV series, 1 episode
1991	Sherlock Holmes and the Leading Lady	Sir Reginald Cholmondley	
