= Henry Gilbert (actor) =

British actor (1913–1973)

- in The Saint ep: The Set-Up (1965)
- Born: Henry Godfrey Gilbert; 4 April 1913; Edmonton, England
- Died: 29 January 1973 (aged 59); Harrow, London, England
- Occupation: Actor

Henry Gilbert (4 April 1913 - 29 January 1973) was an English-born Australian actor who appeared in many popular 1960s and 1970s British TV programmes.

== Selected credits ==
- Long John Silver, 1954 - Billy Bowlegs
- The Return of Mr. Moto, 1965 - David Lennox
- Danger Man, 1966, "I Can Only Offer You Sherry" - Seghir
- Adam Adamant Lives!, 1967, "The Deadly Bullet" - George Manton
- The Champions, 1968, "Twelve Hours" - Drobnic
- Sir Arthur Conan Doyle's Sherlock Holmes, 1968, "The Dancing Men" - Dr Armstrong
- Song of Norway, 1970 - Franz Liszt
- Jason King, 1971, "A Page Before Dying" - Schultz
- Doctor Who, 1972, The Curse of Peladon - Torbis
- Ooh... You Are Awful, 1972 - Don Luigi
