= On Approval (1964 film) =

- Ad from The Age 25 March 1964
- Genre: comedy
- Based on: play by Frederick Londsdale
- Written by: Noel Robinson
- Directed by: Oscar Whitbread
- Country of origin: Australia
- Original language: English

Production
- Running time: 50 minutes
- Production company: ABC

Original release
- Network: ABC
- Release: 14 October 1964 (Sydney)
- Release: 25 March 1964 (Melbourne)

On Approval is a 1964 Australian television play based on the play by Frederick Lonsdale. It was adapted by Noel Robinson.

== Plot ==
At Helen's Mayfair Home, Maria suggests to her suitor Richard that they live together in Scotland for one month. Helen and Richard's friend the Duke of Bristol decide to come along too.

== Cast ==
- Felicity Young as Helen
- Joan Harris as Maria
- Michael Duffield as Richard
- George Whaley as Duke of Bristol
