= Iain Blair =

Scottish actor and author (1942–2011)

- Born: 12 August 1942; Glasgow, Scotland
- Died: 3 July 2011 (aged 68); Torquay, Devon, England
- Education: Royal Conservatoire of Scotland
- Occupations: Journalist, actor, novelist
- Writing career
- Pen name: Emma Blair
- Period: 1960–2007
- Genre: Romantic fiction
- Website: web.archive.org/web/20101116050211/http://emma-blair.com/content/view/33/37/

Iain Blair (12 August 1942 – 3 July 2011) was a Scottish actor and author who, using the pen name Emma Blair, wrote a series of romantic novels.

== Early life, education and early career ==
Blair was born in Glasgow and spent the first few years of his life there. His father died shortly after his birth, and following the death of his mother, when Blair was eleven, he moved to the United States to live with an aunt. He wanted to return to Scotland, however, and got a part-time job at age fifteen to save up for his fare home. After graduating a year later from West Division High School in Milwaukee he returned to Glasgow to begin work with an insurance company. But he quickly became bored with the job and he moved to Australia at seventeen where he worked as a proof reader on the Sydney Bulletin newspaper, and as a lifeguard at Sydney's South Steyne Beach.

== Acting career ==
After a year in Australia he returned to his native Glasgow once again, where he worked as a feature writer on the Sunday Post. But following a visit to the cinema to see Burt Lancaster in The Flame and the Arrow he resolved to become an actor. He won a place at the Royal Scottish Academy of Music and Dramatic Art, and after graduating from there secured work with the Royal Shakespeare Company. During a 20-year career in acting he appeared in many acclaimed television dramas. Among his television acting credits are roles in The Borderers, the police series The Sweeney and Juliet Bravo, The Brontes of Haworth, Rock Follies, The Saint and the sitcom Citizen Smith. In addition to these roles, he featured in an unbroadcast educational episode of Only Fools and Horses in which he portrays an "oil man" who cons David Jason's Del Boy with a dodgy deal.

His acting career came to an end after an exchange with Steven Spielberg when he went to audition for a part in the 1981 film Raiders of the Lost Ark. He once recalled a difficult journey to the studio followed by a lengthy wait: "Eventually a rather small man came into the room. 'I'm Steven Spielberg. Can you come back tomorrow?' he announced, not expecting a negative. 'No, I fucking can't,' I replied in traditional Glasgow fashion. And that was the end of my acting career."

== Writing career ==
Blair began writing while a stage actor, doing so in his spare time. Initially he wrote plays for theatre and television, but later began to write novels. He started out as a thriller writer, but after being unsuccessful with this genre, switched to writing romantic fiction. Upon submitting the first of these stories, titled Where No Man Cries, to his publishers in 1982, it was suggested the book would sell better if the author was a woman. Consequently, he adopted the pseudonym Emma Blair. Speaking about his change of name, he once joked: "The publishers decided on a sex change and so that was that. Emma I became and Emma I stayed." His wife, Jane Blanchard, has said of the Emma Blair nom de plume: "Emma was not the quiet, retiring type but a 6ft 3in Glaswegian called Iain Blair who enjoyed a pint and a smoke."

When No Man Cries, a story set in Glasgow during the inter war years, features a central character who overcomes social and financial hardships and ultimately finds the woman he loves. The book was an immediate success and generated good sales. Blair followed it with a series of other Emma Blair stories, many of them set in Scotland. Writing of Blair, The Scotsman's Alasdair Steven said: "Many of his books were of that genre: strongly romantic but very realistic. Blair had a fine ability to reflect social conditions within the body of his writing while the romantic element provides the main thrust to the story. He was a fine wordsmith and an exceptional story-teller...As he indeed demonstrated in two of his most acclaimed books. Flower of Scotland was about a family of whisky distillers in Perthshire as the First World War is about to break out. The family face many problems and as the war ends, they return to Scotland much changed."

During a writing career spanning three decades he wrote some 30 novels, but his true identity remained a secret until 1998 when his novel Flower of Scotland was nominated for the Romantic Novel of the Year Award, something which required him to admit to being the author of the books. He was one of Britain's most popular authors and his books the most borrowed from British libraries. He was forced to give up writing in 2007 after being diagnosed with diabetes. He died as a result of the condition at his home in Torquay, Devon, on 3 July 2011.

== Personal life ==
Blair was married to the television producer and author Jane Blanchard. The couple lived in Torquay in Devon. Blair is survived by two sons from a previous marriage and a step son.
