= A Sentimental Journey (Randall and Hopkirk (Deceased)) =

"A Sentimental Journey"
- Randall and Hopkirk (Deceased) episode
- Episode no.: Season 1 Episode 19
- Directed by: Leslie Norman
- Written by: Donald James
- Production code: 19
- Original air date: 23 January 1970

Guest appearances
- William Squire; Tracey Crisp; Drewe Henley; Victor Maddern; Antony Baird

Episode chronology
← Previous "Could You Recognise the Man Again?"	Next → "Money to Burn"

"A Sentimental Journey" is the nineteenth episode of the 1969 ITC British television series Randall and Hopkirk (Deceased) starring Mike Pratt and Kenneth Cope. The episode was first broadcast on 23 January 1970 on the ITV. It was directed by Leslie Norman. In this episode Marty learns to search every hotel room in London quickly and is able to blow an entire small aircraft across the runway. Annette Andre does not appear in this episode. The absence of Jeannie Hopkirk, as with her lack of appearance in "When the Spirit Moves You", is not explained in this episode. Also as with "When the Spirit Moves You", Andre still receives a credit at the end of this episode, despite her lack of appearance.

== Production ==
Although the 19th episode in the series, A Sentimental Journey was the 4th episode to be shot, filmed in July–August 1968.

== Cast ==
- Mike Pratt as Jeff Randall
- Kenneth Cope as Marty Hopkirk
- Annette Andre as Jeannie Hopkirk
- William Squire as Sam Seymour
- Tracey Crisp as Dandy Garrison
- Drewe Henley as Tony
- Victor Maddern as Detective Sergeant Watts
- Antony Baird as Hamilton
- John Rae as Alexander
- Larry Taylor as Man in Phone Booth
- Michael Bird as Sleeping Car Attendant
- Billy Cornelius as Albert
