= Nik Zaran =

Vincentian actor (1933–2014)

- in The Champions: Desert Journey (1969)
- Born: Tracy Connell; 19 January 1933; Kingstown, Saint Vincent and the Grenadines
- Died: 3 January 2014 (aged 80); Kingstown, Saint Vincent and the Grenadines
- Occupations: Actor, dancer, theatre pioneer, restaurateur
- Years active: 1961–1975 (film & TV)

Tracy Connell (19 January 1933 – 3 January 2014), also known by his stage name Nik Zaran, was a Vincentian actor.

== Early life ==
Initially a keen sportsman, he mainly played football and cricket while attending the St. Vincent Grammar School. However, his dream was to become an actor. Aged 19 in 1952, Connell came to England, initially joining the Royal Air Force before going into acting, his training being funded by the RAF. By attending acting school, he quickly learnt skills that included acting, dancing and singing.

== Career ==
Zaran began his career in song and dance in cabaret, afterwards performing at the Pigalle Club and later in Paris. This was followed by acting performances with different repertory companies. From 1961, he appeared in television roles, firstly using his birth name before adopting Nik Zaran as his stage name in 1967. He appeared in many cult TV favourites including Danger Man, Man in a Suitcase, The Saint, The Champions, Doctor Who – The Space Pirates, Department S, The Troubleshooters, Randall and Hopkirk (Deceased) – The Trouble with Women, Jason King and It Ain't Half Hot Mum plus a few films notably the Blaxploitation flick Shaft in Africa. Other work included commercials for Fry's Cocoa and British Overseas Airways Corporation (BOAC).

== Later life ==
Returning to SVG in 1977 and reverting to his original name of Tracy Connell, the actor concentrated on dance and theatre, tutoring several Vincentians to get into the business as well as setting up a theatre company, staging shows at the Peace Memorial Hall in Kingston including the phenomenal That Christmas Feeling in 1981, which Tracy wrote, produced and directed. He also acted as trainer on the Carnival Development Committee, training contestants and dancers expected to perform at beauty shows.

In addition upon his return home, he helped extend a family business, Kingstown’s Bounty Restaurant (opened in 1968) to become the Bounty Restaurant and Art Gallery. Running it with his wife, the place served as an art gallery for paintings by local artists as well as being an eatery for many years before closing its doors in 2012.

== Filmography ==
=== Film ===
| Year | Title | Role | Notes |
|---|---|---|---|
| 1963 | Cleopatra | Egyptian | Uncredited |
| 1965 | The Return of Mr. Moto | Arab | (as Tracy Connell) |
| 1972 | Four Dimensions of Greta | Johnny Maltese | (as Nick Zaran) |
| 1973 | Tiffany Jones | Anton | (as Nick Zaran) |
| 1973 | Shaft in Africa | Sadi | (as Nick Zaran) |
| 1973 | White Cargo | Strip Club Manager | |

=== Television ===
| Year | Title | Role | Notes |
|---|---|---|---|
| 1968 | The Champions | Said | Episode: Desert Journey |
| 1969 | Department S | Jean / Turkish Inspector | 2 episodes |
| 1969 | Randall and Hopkirk (Deceased) | Brin | Episode: "The Trouble with Women" |
| 1970 | Mystery and Imagination | Priest | Episode: "Curse of the Mummy" |
| 1970 | Codename | Prodnik | Episode: "Warhead" |
| 1971 | Hine | General Khoury | 3 episodes |
| 1973 | The Regiment | Dost Mohammed Khan | Episode: "North West Frontier" |
