= The Trouble with Women (Randall and Hopkirk (Deceased)) =

"The Trouble with Women"
- Randall and Hopkirk (Deceased) episode
- Episode no.: Season 1 Episode 23
- Directed by: Cyril Frankel
- Written by: Tony Williamson
- Production code: 23
- Original air date: 28 February 1970

Guest appearance
- Edward Brayshaw

Episode chronology
← Previous "It's Supposed to be Thicker than Water"	Next → "Vendetta for a Dead Man"

"The Trouble with a Woman" is the twenty-third episode of the 1969 ITC British television series Randall and Hopkirk (Deceased) starring Mike Pratt, Kenneth Cope and Annette Andre. The episode was first broadcast on 28 February 1970 on ITV. It was directed by Cyril Frankel.

== Synopsis ==
Jeff is hired by Susan Lang to log her husband's movements. It transpires that she is not all that she appears, and that Jeff is entering a very dangerous situation.

== Overview ==
With Jeff in danger, Marty attempts to speak with a psychic medium so as to get the police to him. In so doing, he finds a group of ghosts, all in different white clothing, who are waiting in line to deliver their messages.

== Cast ==
- Mike Pratt .... Jeff Randall
- Kenneth Cope .... Marty Hopkirk
- Annette Andre .... Jeannie Hopkirk
- Neal Arden .... 2nd Poker Player
- Edward Brayshaw .... Paul Lang
- Denise Buckley .... Susan Lang
- Arnold Diamond .... 1st Poker Player
- Howard Goorney .... 1st Ghost
- Keith Grenville .... P.C. Russell
- Harry Hutchinson .... 2nd Ghost
- Paul Maxwell .... Alan Corder
- Gwen Nelson .... Mrs. Halloway
- Robert Russell .... Harry
- Frederick Treves .... Inspector
- Nik Zaran .... Brin

== Production ==
Although the 23rd episode in the series, The Trouble with Women was the ninth episode to be shot, filmed between September and November 1968.
