= The Man from Nowhere =

The Man from Nowhere may refer to:

- The Man from Nowhere (1916 film), a US silent film directed by Henry Otto
- The Man from Nowhere (1937 film) (French: L'Homme de nulle part), a French film directed by Pierre Chenal
- The Man from Nowhere (comics), a story in the series of Dan Dare comics, first appearing in 1955
- The Man from Nowhere (1961 film), a Soviet film
- Arizona Colt, alternatively known as The Man from Nowhere, a 1966 Italian film directed by Michele Lupo
- "The Man from Nowhere" (Randall and Hopkirk (Deceased)), an episode of the British television series Randall and Hopkirk (Deceased), first shown in 1969
- The Man from Nowhere (2010 film), a Korean film directed by Lee Jeong-beom
