= Vendetta for a Dead Man =

- Randall and Hopkirk (Deceased) episode
- Episode no.: Season 1 Episode 24
- Directed by: Cyril Frankel
- Written by: Donald James
- Production code: 24
- Original air date: 27 February 1970

Guest appearances
- George Sewell; Timothy West

Episode chronology
| ← Previous "The Trouble with Women" | Next → "You Can Always Find a Fall Guy" |

"Vendetta for a Dead Man" is the twenty-fourth episode of the 1969 ITC British television series Randall and Hopkirk (Deceased) starring Mike Pratt, Kenneth Cope and Annette Andre. The episode was first broadcast on 27 February 1970 on ITV. It was directed by Cyril Frankel.

== Synopsis ==
A convicted murderer named Eric Jansen escapes from the psychiatric ward of his prison almost exactly one year after he was locked up by Marty Hopkirk. Seeking his revenge he finds that Marty has already died but learns that his widow Jeannie Hopkirk is very much alive and has inherited everything he owned. He hunts Jeannie down who at the time was engrossed in a new love interest of her own eventually taking her to some rocky cliffs. There he intended to cast her into the sea exactly one year after he was caught in the same spot. But thanks to Marty, Jeff is there in the nick of time and saves Jeannie whilst Jansen loses his balance and falls in the sea.

== Cast ==
- Mike Pratt as Jeff Randall
- Kenneth Cope as Marty Hopkirk
- Annette Andre as Jeannie Hopkirk
- Ann Castle .... Mrs. Cavallo-Smith
- Henry Davies .... Police Sergeant in Car
- William Dysart .... Police Inspector
- Barrie Ingham .... Emil Cavallo-Smith
- Richard Owens .... Police Sergeant Bodyguard
- Ron Pember .... Fairground Concessionaire
- Colin Rix .... Police Driver
- George Sewell .... Eric Jansen
- Sue Vaughan .... Blonde Girl in Car
- Timothy West .... Sam Grimes
