= Money to Burn (Randall and Hopkirk (Deceased)) =

"Money to Burn"
- Randall and Hopkirk (Deceased) episode
- Episode no.: Season 1 Episode 20
- Directed by: Ray Austin
- Written by: Donald James
- Production code: 20
- Original air date: 30 January 1970

Guest appearance
- Roy Desmond

Episode chronology
← Previous "A Sentimental Journey"	Next → "The Ghost Talks"

"Money to Burn" is the twentieth episode of the 1969 ITC British television series Randall and Hopkirk (Deceased) starring Mike Pratt, Kenneth Cope and Annette Andre. It was directed by Ray Austin.

== Synopsis ==
Randall is offered by a dodgy Irish friend, O’Malley, to take part in a money salvaging operation whereby £500,000 of old money is to be burnt, but is replaced with newspaper pieces. Neither informing the police nor accepting any part in the crime, Randall watches from a nearby street and is caught by the police and held in custody. His lawyer, Elizabeth, tracks down O’Malley at his London club and finds that the real culprits are female dancers, who attempt to fly to France in escape. However, the ghost Marty is able to manipulate their navigational equipment and get them to return to an airfield in Surrey, where they are captured, freeing Randall. Back at the police station Marty informs Jeff that Elizabeth is driving O’Malley home, to which Jeff realising what she is like, tells Marty what she is about to do. The episode ends showing Elizabeth’s car in a field, where inside she and O’Malley are kissing, about to have sex.

== Overview ==
In this episode Jeff's morality is questioned as he considers accepting the money to be incinerated.

== Cast ==
- Mike Pratt as Jeff Randall
- Kenneth Cope as Marty Hopkirk
- Annette Andre as Jeannie Hopkirk
- Ivor Dean ... Inspector Large
- Roger Avon ... Uniformed Policeman
- Norman Beaton ... Policeman
- Tom Bowman ... Security Man
- Linda Cole ... Anne-Marie Benson
- Roy Desmond ... Kevin O'Malley
- John Glyn-Jones... Chemist
- John Hughes ... Bank Worker
- Richard Kerley ... Sgt. Hinds
- Sue Lloyd ... Elizabeth Saxon
- Olga Lowe... Angela Kendon
- Don Vernon ... Choreographer
