= You Can Always Find a Fall Guy =

- Randall and Hopkirk (Deceased) episode
- Episode no.: Episode 25
- Directed by: Ray Austin
- Written by: Donald James
- Production code: 25
- Original air date: 6 March 1970

Guest appearances
- Patrick Barr; Clifford Earl; Juliet Harmer; Jeremy Young; Garfield Morgan

Episode chronology
| ← Previous "Vendetta for a Dead Man" | Next → "The Smile Behind the Veil" |

"You Can Always Find a Fall Guy" is the twenty-fifth episode of the 1969 ITC British television series Randall and Hopkirk (Deceased) starring Mike Pratt, Kenneth Cope and Annette Andre. The episode was first broadcast on 6 March 1970 on the ITV. It was directed by Ray Austin.

== Synopsis ==
Arriving home after a long night, Jeff is greeted by a nun at his apartment. The nun proceeds to tell Jeff that she believes her convent's funds are being diverted by a recently employed accountant - Douglas Kershaw. Jeff reluctantly agrees to look into the case, and arranges to meet the nun at the convent the following night.

With Marty in tow, he is met at the convent gates by the nun, who hands him a sealed envelope containing the account figures of the convent. Unbeknownst to Jeff, the nun replaces a sign for the convent with another sign - one for an electronics company. Before leaving, Jeff and Marty hear an alarm and then guard dogs. Jeff decides to leave, but before he can he is blocked in the drive by the Security Officer and sent to the office of Philip Yateman, where he tries to explain his reasons for being on the premises. Yateman decides to hold Jeff overnight, but, when attention is diverted by Marty, Jeff is able to escape. Jeff manages to retrieve the envelope he had earlier thrown away and opens it to find only newspaper cuttings.

The next morning Jeff is met in his car by the Security Officer - Edwards. Believing that the envelope contains important information Edwards offers a deal to Jeff, not believing that the envelope contained only newsprint. After the meeting, Jeff decides to visit Douglas Kershaw. He refuses to divulge any information to Jeff - merely saying he is a dealer in information.

Later, Marty goes to the office to find the police there who believe him to have stolen documents sworn by Yateman. Marty tells Jeff, who then realises the set up, and so decides to visit Yateman to tell his version of the story. Yateman doesn't believe Jeff's version of events, so Jeff decides to visit Kershaw instead, this time to get him to tell the police that he has never had any dealings with him. Kershaw refuses, and Jeff realises that Kershaw is in on the plot as well. Yateman then arrives, with the Personnel Manager, Miss Holiday, who posed as the nun. After a fight, Jeff is taken off by the pair, and locked away in a cellar.

Jeff calls on Marty for help. Marty tells Jeff he has been working on a plan, and visits a local hospital, where he visits a patient undergoing surgery. The patient has a near death experience during which Marty tells him to phone the police with the information about Jeff's kidnap. After surgery the patient awakens and demands a telephone. After a struggle he is allowed a phone and calls the police which leads to Jeff being freed by Edwards, and Yateman's arrest.

== Cast ==
- Mike Pratt as Jeff Randall
- Kenneth Cope as Marty Hopkirk
- Annette Andre as Jeannie Hopkirk
- Patrick Barr ... Philip Yateman
- Clifford Earl ... 1st Detective
- Juliet Harmer ... Miss Holiday
- Jeremy Young ... Douglas Kershaw
- Garfield Morgan ... Edwards
- Maggie London ... Nurse
- Edward Caddick ... Patient
- Tony Steedman ... Surgeon
- Michael Graham ... Anaesthetist

== Production ==
Although the 25th episode in the series, You Can Always Find a Fall Guy was the 5th episode to be shot, filmed between July and September 1968. The exteriors of the convent in the episode were shot at Grim's Dyke.
