= The Smile Behind the Veil =

- Randall and Hopkirk (Deceased) episode
- Episode no.: Season 1 Episode 26
- Directed by: Jeremy Summers
- Written by: Gerald Kelsey
- Production code: 26
- Original air date: 13 March 1970

Guest appearances
- Alex Scott; Hilary Tindall; Gary Watson

Episode chronology
← Previous "You Can Always Find a Fall Guy"	Next → —

"The Smile Behind the Veil" is the final episode of the 1969 ITC British television series Randall and Hopkirk (Deceased), starring Mike Pratt, Kenneth Cope, and Annette Andre. The episode was first broadcast on 13 March 1970 on ITV and was directed by Jeremy Summers.

== Synopsis ==
At the funeral of his friend Caroline Seaton, Marty observes her brother Donald and his wife Cynthia, who seems to be smiling, and he deduces that they have killed Caroline. Jeff is reluctant to investigate so Marty tricks him into visiting the Seaton home, where an attempt is made to kill him. Due to Marty's intervention, he is saved by the real Donald Seaton, who has returned from Australia to find an impostor has taken his name, married his ex-wife - Cynthia - and killed both his father and Caroline for the Seaton estate. The killers throw Jeff down a well but Marty causes two hikers to rescue him and, as the villains are caught and the true Donald takes his inheritance, the partnership of Randall and Hopkirk -Deceased - continues.

== Cast ==
- Mike Pratt as Jeff Randall
- Kenneth Cope as Marty Hopkirk
- Annette Andre as Jeannie Hopkirk
- John Bott ... Dyson
- David Forbes ... Police Constable
- Robin Hawdon ... Grant
- George Howe ... Brooks
- Freda Jackson ... Mrs. Evans
- Clare Jenkins ... Female Hiker
- Peter Jesson ... Hooper
- Peter Lawrence ... Policeman
- Michael Radford ... Male Hiker
- Alex Scott ... Seaton
- Hilary Tindall ... Cynthia
- Gary Watson ... Donald Seaton

== Production ==
Although the 26th and final episode in the series, The Smile Behind the Veil was the 7th episode to be shot, filmed between August and September 1968.
