= Denise Buckley =

British actress (born 1945)

- Born: Elizabeth Denise Buckley; 26 April 1945 (age 81); Abergavenny, Wales
- Spouse: Scott Marshall
- Children: 2

Elizabeth Denise Buckley (born 26 April 1945) is a British actress.

== Life and career ==
Buckley studied at the Guildhall School of Music and Drama, which she left in April 1965. She then worked in rep in Bournemouth and Worthing. Her first TV contract was to play Claire King in Emergency Ward 10. Memorably, she appeared as a gaslighted victim in the episode A Cellar Full of Silence in the classic spy-fi series Department S.

Since 1970, Buckley has been married to Scott Marshall, a casting agent, and the couple have two children: daughter Liza Marshall, who became a television producer, and son Jesse.

== Partial filmography ==
=== Television ===
- Emergency Ward 10 (1965) - Claire King
- The Wednesday Play (1966) (1 episode) - Susan
- The White Rabbit (1967) (4 episodes) - Barbara
- The Prisoner (1967) (1 episode) - Maid
- The Wednesday Play (1967) (1 episode) - Marion
- Man in a Suitcase (1968) (1 episode) - Manageress
- The Avengers (1969) (1 episode) - Sally Unstrutter
- Department S (1969) (1 episode) - Libby Spear
- Thirty-Minute Theatre (1969) (1 episode) - Barbara
- Who-Dun-It (1969) (1 episode) - Carole Stewart
- The Borderers (1970) (1 episode) - Lady Mary Fleming
- The Misfit (1970) (1 episode) - Rose
- Randall and Hopkirk (Deceased) (1970) (1 episode) - Susan Lang
- Play for Today (1970) (1 episode) - Danish Girl
- ITV Sunday Night Theatre (1971) (1 episode) - Fiona Macleod
- Out of the Unknown (1971) (1 episode) - Ann
- Playhouse (1971) (1 episode) - Tegwen
- New Scotland Yard (1972, 1973) (2 episodes)
- Armchair Theatre (1972, 1973) (2 episodes)
- Thriller (1974) (1 episode) - Sheila Howes
- A Bunch of Fives (1977) (2 episodes) - Anna Fergusson
