= Alex Scott (actor) =

Australian-British actor (1929–2015)

Alex Scott

Alex Scott (18 September 1929 – 25 June 2015) was an Australian-British television actor best known for his appearances in British television productions of the 1960s, including Special Branch, The Avengers, The Persuaders! (episode 1, 1971), Danger Man, The Saint and the final episode ("The Smile Behind the Veil", 1969) of Randall and Hopkirk (Deceased). He also appeared as Klaus in The Adventures of William Tell, episode 22 "The Killer" (1959).

Scott had roles in such films as Darling (1965), Fahrenheit 451 (1966), The Blue Max (1966), The Abominable Dr. Phibes (1971), Twins of Evil (1971) and The Asphyx (1972), and was directed by Sir Laurence Olivier (The Shifting Heart), François Truffaut, John Sumner (Godsend) and John Schlesinger, among others.

== Film career ==
He made over 60 appearances on British TV between 1955 and the 1990s but moved back to Australia in 1981. Since his return to Australia he had roles in the films Next of Kin (1982), Now and Forever (1983), Sky Pirates (1986) and Romper Stomper (1992). He was a founding member of the Melbourne Theatre Company and worked in theatre, television and film after his return. He played opposite Zoe Caldwell, another founding member and four-time Tony Award winning actor, in the Melbourne Theatre Company's The Visit in 2003 as a part of the 50th-anniversary season of the company. He also appeared in A Number, a play by Caryl Churchill and directed by Frank Howson, in 2006.

== Personal life ==
Scott grew up in Ballarat, Victoria, and was educated at St Patrick's College, Ballarat; Xavier College in Melbourne; and the University of Melbourne. He lived in Toorak, Victoria, and had two sons, Rainer and Daniel, from his first marriage His later partner was Barbara Ady-Potger, cousin of the Seekers band member Keith Potger, AO. Scott died peacefully at his home in Toorak on 25 June 2015.

== Filmography ==
Year	Title	Role	Notes
1960	Marriage of Convenience	Vic Ellis	
1963	Ricochet	John Brodie	
1964	Becket	Priest	Uncredited
1964	The Sicilians	Henri Perrault	
1965	The Amorous Adventures of Moll Flanders	Third Mohock	
1965	Darling	Sean Martin	
1966	The Blue Max	The Orator	
1966	Fahrenheit 451	Book Person: 'The Life of Henry Brulard'	
1967	Solarnauts	Logik	TV Pilot
1969	Vendetta for the Saint	The Major	
1971	The Abominable Dr. Phibes	Dr. Hargreaves	
1971	Quest for Love		
1971	Twins of Evil	Hermann	
1972	The Asphyx	Sir Edward Barrett	
1976	The Howerd Confessions	Pierre	episode 2
1982	Next of Kin	Dr Barton	
1983	Now and Forever	Andrew Wundham	
1986	Sky Pirates	Gen. Hackett	
1991	Antarctica	Narrator	Documentary
1992	Romper Stomper	Martin	
2009	Remembering Nigel	Himself	
