= Say Hello to Yesterday =

1971 British film by Alvin Rakoff

- Theatrical Release Poster
- Directed by: Alvin Rakoff
- Screenplay by: Alvin Rakoff and Peter King (from an original story by Alvin Rakoff and Ray Mathew)
- Produced by: Josef Shaftel
- Starring: Jean Simmons; Leonard Whiting; Evelyn Laye; Derek Francis; Geoffrey Bayldon; James Cossins; Frank Middlemass; Gwen Nelson
- Cinematography: Geoffrey Unsworth
- Edited by: Ralph Sheldon
- Music by: Riz Ortolani
- Production company: Joseph Shaftel Productions
- Distributed by: Cinerama Releasing Corporation
- Release date: January 14, 1971 (Premiere)
- Running time: 96 minutes
- Country: United Kingdom
- Language: English
- Budget: $1.2 million or more than £500,000

Say Hello to Yesterday (also known as What Ever Happened to Happy Endings?) is a 1971 British romantic comedy-drama film directed by Alvin Rakoff and starring Jean Simmons and Leonard Whiting. It was written by Rakoff and Peter King, based on an original story by Rakoff and Ray Mathew.

The film covers 10 hours in the life of a suburban housewife.

== Plot ==
On a winter morning in an suburb, the Woman – having just said goodbye to her husband and their two young children – is going to London, shopping. She drives to the station which is shown as Cobham (referencing Cobham, Surrey or Cobham, Kent). Among the crowd, as she boards the train is the Boy. It is his birthday today and he's determined to make the day different.

The Boy moves up and down the crowded corridors. The Woman in her non-smoking compartment badly wants a cigarette and starts to scrape away a 'No Smoking' sign. The Boy is attracted by this middle class rebellion, pulls the sign off and presents it to her and tries to engage her in conversation.

Later, battling her way into a department store she finds he has followed her. Leaving the store, she thinks she has lost him. But he catches up with her on a crowded pavement. She tries to throw him off, he finds her again. She flees to her mother's apartment – followed by the Boy. The Woman is desperately embarrassed and tries to explain, but her mother treats the whole thing lightly and the Woman learns with surprise that her parents both had affairs with other people during the war. Mother says 'He's good for you. If you have an affair with that boy you'll regret it. On the other hand, if you don't have an affair with him you'll also regret it...' He tells an estate agent that he is a successful talent agent and gets the keys to an empty flat. The Woman and the Boy have sex together there. He tells her that he loves her and suggests they have an affair, but she declines his offer. She goes to London Victoria station and goes home.

== Cast ==
- Jean Simmons as the woman
- Leonard Whiting as the boy
- Evelyn Laye as the woman's mother
- Derek Francis as park keeper
- Geoffrey Bayldon as estate agent
- James Cossins as policeman
- Edward Atienza as porter
- Frank Middlemass as station master
- Gwen Nelson as char at Labour Exchange
- Constance Chapman as the boy's mother (uncredited)
- Jack Woolgar as the boy's father (uncredited)
- Ellis Dale as train passenger (uncredited)
- Harry Fielder as bus conductor (uncredited)
- Susan Penhaligon as girl on train (uncredited)
- Jimmy Gardner as balloon seller (uncredited)

== Production ==
According to Rakoff, Say Hello to Yesterday was "a 1970 Brief Encounter a picture designed purely for entertainment, with no morals or messages unless the public like to find them."

Jean Simmons returned to London after a five-year absence to star in the film.

According to Rakoff, "The original title was to have been Whatever Happened to Happy Endings? but Cinerama didn't want to use this title, partly because Jean Simmons had just starred in and been Academy Award nominated for, the similarly titled The Happy Ending and partly because Cinerama feared that because Whatever Happened to Baby Jane? was a film of the era and there was a series of Whatever Happened... films, they might be sued by other companies."

The song played during the closing credits was sung by Mark Wynter.

Filming took ten weeks in London at Twickenham Studios and on location in London, Slough, and Ascot railway station.

=== Music ===
Music was by Riz Ortolani. He was not the choice of the director who cut the film to the music of Joni Mitchell and Donovan's "Colours".

== Reception ==
The Monthly Film Bulletin wrote: "Optimistically described as a 'Brief Encounter of the Seventies', this arch and cold-blooded romance is a long way from anything other than its own modish contemporaries, and Alvin Rakoff surrenders with complete abandon to the principle that visual effects take precedence over the story being told: no sooner have the couple finished an obligatory stint on the swings and slides at the children's playground than they are whisked into the Planetarium or to the top of the Post Office Tower. And when the affair is over, the boy's last defiant gesture takes the form of releasing a bunch of balloons over Victoria Station (which presumably looks more photogenic than Waterloo, the actual departure point for trains to Cobham). Jean Simmons performs throughout with a detached dignity – an indispensable quality for clambering through climbing frames – but Leonard Whiting, accustomed to playing more orthodox young lovers, is no match for the part of the boy, a larger than life character at the best of times and a hazily defined one at worst."

Variety called it "a silly and contrived meant-to-be modish version of Brief Encounter" in which the Whiting's character "is just too banal to be believable, and his antics, which are meant to be cute, are simply adolescent and embarrassing. Commercial prospects appear dim."
