= Robin Hawdon =

English playwright and novelist (born 1939)

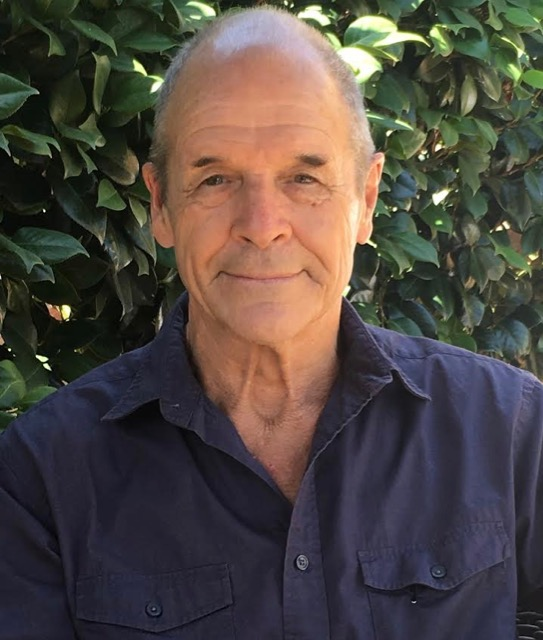
Hawdon in 2018

Robin Hawdon is an English playwright and novelist, with previous additional careers as actor and theatre director. He is best known for his stage comedies and novels.

== Education ==
Robin Hawdon was educated at Whitgift Grammar School and Uppingham public school. He later attended the Royal Academy of Dramatic Art (RADA) in London.

== Career ==
=== Acting ===
His career as an actor was first established with seasons at Chesterfield, York, Guildford and Bristol Old Vic repertory theatres, and in London's West End in a variety of roles including Roar Like A Dove (Phoenix), The Last Joke (Phoenix), The Easter Man (title role - Globe), Misalliance (Royal Court), One Over The Eight (Duke of Yorks). He also played Hamlet in Cape Town, Prince Hal and Henry V at York, and Henry Higgins in Pygmalion at Salisbury.

He made many TV appearances, in particular as Barry Southern in the series Compact (BBC), The Flying Swan (BBC), Spasms (co-star with Jonathan Pryce - Thames TV) and Chalk and Cheese, (co-star with Michael Crawford - Thames TV 1977). He featured in a number of films, including The Day the Earth Caught Fire, We Joined the Navy, Bedazzled (1967), the spoof James Bond film Zeta One (star) (The Love Factor in the USA) (1969), When Dinosaurs Ruled the Earth (star) (1970), Randall and Hopkirk (Deceased) Episode 26 – The Smile Behind the Veil as Grant (1970), The Howerd Confessions, as P.C.Trimble, Burke & Hare (1971) and I Want What I Want (1972).

He was scheduled by the 'James Bond' producers to film test for the role, but the test was cancelled when Roger Moore finally accepted the part.

=== Writing ===
His writing career began in with plays produced at the Hampstead Theatre, and The King's Lynn and Salzburg Festivals, and with a nationwide tour of The Hero starring Roy Dotrice. His first large commercial success was with the comedy The Mating Game, which had a long run at London's Apollo Theatre and played in over 30 countries around the world.

Subsequently, a number of comedies played regularly on tour and internationally, many being published by Samuel French and Josef Weinberger. These were followed by his farce Don't Dress for Dinner (loosely based on a French play by Marc Camoletti) which ran for six years in London and subsequently on Broadway, and plays regularly in theatres around the English speaking world.

The rights to most of the published plays are owned by Hawdon's company, Hawdon Productions Ltd.

Hawdon's comedy Birthday Suite has played on and off for over thirty-five years across Europe, as it was first played in 1983 at the Redgrave Theatre, Farnham. His comedy Shady Business played in Paris for five months at the Michodière Theatre. His most globally performed comedy, with several hundred productions across thirty countries, is Perfect Wedding

His straight play, God And Stephen Hawking, based on Hawking’s life and his best-selling book A Brief History of Time, toured the UK in 2000 starring Robert Hardy and Stephen Boxer. His thriller, Revenge, starring Fiona Fullerton and Patrick Mower, toured the UK in 2020-23, and his adaptation of Kingsley Amis's Booker Prize winner, "The Old Devils" toured Britain and the USA in 1989' (nominated for the John Barrymore award).

He has written several novels, notably A Rustle In The Grass (Hutchinson), and Survival Of The Fittest (Strategic Publishing). 'Number Ten' political thriller short-listed for the International Thriller Prize

His memoir Almost Famous (2021) was published on Amazon.

Among his latest stage comedies are Stage Fright and A Night in Provence. Stage Fright is also known as Coup de Grace and in the United States as Diamonds and Divas. The comedy was premiered in Germany, in 2017 and later played in Australia and Canada.

A Night in Provence premiered in Germany and United Kingdom and later played in Zürich, Switzerland and Massachusetts, United States.

=== Directing ===
Hawdon directed various plays in the provinces and in London, including The Magic Of Young Houdini (Phoenix), Suez (Savoy). He founded the Bath Fringe Festival in the 1980s and subsequently became Director of Bath Theatre Royal, where he created what later became the Ustinov Theatre, one of UK's most distinguished studio theatres.

== Personal life ==
He was born in Newcastle-on-Tyne, the son of Bunty (née Middleton) and James Oldroyd, a businessman. At the age of eight his family moved to Surrey where he lived for most of his school years. After graduating from RADA he lived in London for twenty years, after which he decided to curtail his acting career and concentrate on writing, and he and his family moved to Bath, Somerset.

He was married to actress, author, and psychoanalyst Sheila Davies who died in October 2024, and with whom he has two daughters.

Hawdon lives between Bath, the South of France, and Australia.
