= Gary Watson =

British retired actor (born 1930)

- Born: Garrowby Cawthorne Watson; 13 June 1930 (age 96); Shifnal, Shropshire, England
- Occupation: Actor
- Years active: 1955–1990; 2014

Garrowby Cawthorne Watson (born 13 June 1930), known professionally as Gary Watson, is a British retired actor. Early in his career he appeared in Friedrich Hebbel's 1962 play Judith at Her Majesty's Theatre in London, with Sean Connery. He made more than 40 appearances in television programmes between 1956 and 1988, and many more on radio and in commercials.

He became known for his appearances in British ITC productions of the 1960s, including The Avengers, The Saint and Randall and Hopkirk (Deceased) in 1969 in the last episode "The Smile Behind the Veil". In 1966 he appeared as Aramis in all ten episodes of The Three Musketeers, starring alongside Brian Blessed and Jeremy Young. He also appeared in the 1967 Doctor Who serial The Evil of the Daleks. He was the Narrator of the 1972 BBC 1 series Mistress of Hardwick He played Denisov in the 1972 television series War and Peace. and the semi-regular character of Detective Inspector Fred Connor in the long-running BBC police drama Z-Cars between 1972 and 1974. In 1974 he played George Vavasor in five episodes of The Pallisers. In 1977 he played the role of Ross in the BBC series Murder Most English. He also appeared in the 1970 Thames Television adaptation of Macbeth , playing MacDuff. He was also much employed as a reader and narrator, featuring in dozens of commercials throughout the 1970s and 1980s. He was particularly noted for his work for British Transport Films and commercials for Lloyds Bank and Nescafé.

Watson was born in Shropshire on 13 June 1930. He attended Kingswood School, where he was a classmate of Anthony Thwaite. graduated from the University of Cambridge. In the late 1950s he taught English at Westminster City School, off Victoria Street in London. He was very popular with the pupils and directed some school plays such as Treasure Island, starring a young Ken Phillips as Doctor Trelawny.
