= The Man from Nowhere (Randall and Hopkirk (Deceased)) =

"The Man from Nowhere"
- Randall and Hopkirk (Deceased) episode
- Episode no.: Season 1 Episode 15
- Directed by: Robert Tronson
- Written by: Donald James
- Production code: 15
- Original air date: 28 December 1969

Guest appearances
- Ray Brooks; James Bree; Michael Gwynn; Neil McCarthy; Patrick Newell

Episode chronology
| ← Previous "Who Killed Cock Robin?" | Next → "When the Spirit Moves You" |

"The Man from Nowhere" is the fifteenth episode of the 1969 ITC British television series Randall and Hopkirk (Deceased) starring Mike Pratt, Kenneth Cope and Annette Andre. The episode was first broadcast on 28 December 1969 on the ITV. It was directed by Robert Tronson.

== Overview ==
In this episode Jeannie once again falls for the deception of another man, this time pretending to be Marty. Although she is extremely impressed with his knowledge that Marty once had as they visit Woburn Abbey, it is far more likely she is attracted to the man himself rather than truly believing he is Marty in spirit. However she is again used.

== Cast ==
- Mike Pratt as Jeff Randall
- Kenneth Cope as Marty Hopkirk
- Annette Andre as Jeannie Hopkirk
- James Bree .... Mullet, the Innkeeper
- Ray Brooks .... Marty/Sheldon
- Michael Gwynn .... Hyde Watson
- Neil McCarthy .... Griggs
- Patrick Newell .... Mannering
