= George Sewell =

English actor (1924–2007)

- Born: 31 August 1924; Hoxton, London, England
- Died: 2 April 2007 (aged 82); London, England
- Occupation: Actor
- Years active: 1963–2006
- Spouse: Helen Logan Davies (m. 1961)
- Children: 1

George Sewell (31 August 1924 – 2 April 2007) was an English actor, best known for his television roles, but also active on stage and in films.

== Early life and early career ==
The son of a Hoxton printer and a florist, Sewell left school at the age of 14 and worked briefly in the printing trade before switching to building work, specifically the repair of bomb-damaged houses. He then trained as a Royal Air Force pilot, though too late to see action during the Second World War.

Following his demob, Sewell joined the Merchant Navy. He worked for the Cunard Line as an oil trimmer in the engine rooms of the RMS Queen Mary and RMS Queen Elizabeth during their Atlantic crossings to New York. He worked as a street photographer, assisted a French roller-skating team, and was drummer and assistant road manager of a rumba band. He also travelled Europe as a motor coach courier for a holiday company.

== Acting career ==
=== Theatre ===
Sewell had not considered acting until, aged 35, he met the actor Dudley Sutton by chance in a pub. Sutton recommended that Sewell audition for a production by Joan Littlewood's Theatre Workshop of Fings Ain't Wot They Used T'Be. Sewell made his acting debut as a policeman in the show both at the Theatre Royal, Stratford East and in the West End. He went on to star in two other Littlewood productions, Sparrers Can't Sing (1962) and as Field Marshal Haig in Oh, What a Lovely War! (1963), which later opened in Paris and on Broadway.

=== Television ===
For many years, Sewell was the gritty face of crime and law enforcement in a huge array of television series. Amongst his early roles, he was the tallyman in the television play Up The Junction (1965), a criminal who runs off with a teenage girl in Softly, Softly (1966), a hard-nosed building engineer in The Power Game (1965–66), a cowardly informer in Man in a Suitcase (1967), and a seedy private eye in Spindoe (1968). In 1969 he played escaped convict Jansen in the Randall and Hopkirk (Deceased) episode "Vendetta for a Dead Man". In 1970, he played Colonel Alec Freeman in Gerry Anderson's live-action science-fiction drama UFO. Also in 1970 he played resistance leader Pierre Allard in three episodes of the ITV series Manhunt – 14 (“One Way Home”), 17 (“The Ugly Side of War”) and 22 (“Intent to Steal”), which were filmed in 1969 and aired in January 1970. He appeared in a 1971 episode of Public Eye (“Come Into the Garden, Rose”) as Harry Brierly.

In 1973, Euston Films re-invigorated the TV series Special Branch, formerly a videotaped series starring Derren Nesbitt. Sewell was brought in to play lead character DCI Alan Craven. The show ran for two seasons with Sewell, and served as a stylistic forerunner of crime drama The Sweeney (in which Sewell also appeared, this time as a villain). Sewell parodied this role as Supt Frank Cottam in the Jasper Carrott–Robert Powell comedy, The Detectives.

He played a Detective Baker who turned out to be a burglar in the Rising Damp episode “The Prowler”.

He played Ray Walker in Heartbeat (series 9 episode 20).

=== Later roles ===
Later television appearances include Tinker Tailor Soldier Spy (1979), in which he played Mendel, and the Doctor Who story Remembrance of the Daleks (1988), in which he played builder's merchant and fascist leader Ratcliffe. He appeared frequently in films, notably This Sporting Life (1963), Poor Cow (1967) and Get Carter (1971).

He was the subject of This Is Your Life in 1973 when he was surprised by Eamonn Andrews while filming scenes for the TV series Special Branch.

== Personal life and death ==
His brother, Danny Sewell, a former boxer, also became an actor. George Sewell died from cancer on 2 April 2007 at the age of 82.

== Filmography ==
=== Film ===
Film
Year	Title	Role	Notes
1963	This Sporting Life	Jeff	
1963	Sparrows Can't Sing	Bert	
1963	A Place to Go	Market Trader	Uncredited.
1963	The Informers	Fred Hill	
1966	Kaleidoscope	Billy	
1967	Deadlier Than the Male	Car Park Assassin	Uncredited.
1967	Robbery	Ben	
1967	Poor Cow	Customer in Pub	Scenes deleted.
1968	The Vengeance of She	Harry	
1969	The Haunted House of Horror	Bob Kellett	
1969	Doppelgänger	Mark Neuman	
1971	Get Carter	Con McCarty	
1973	Diamonds on Wheels	Henry Stewart	
1973	UFO - Allarme rosso... attacco alla Terra!	Col. Alec E. Freeman	Italian-language series UFO compilation film.
1973	Kill Straker, a Question of Priorities	Col. Alec E. Freeman	UFO compilation film, known in the Italian-language series as "UFO - Distruggete Base Luna".
1974	UFO - Prendeteli vivi!	Col. Alec E. Freeman	Italian-language series UFO compilation film.
1974	UFO - Contatto Radar... stanno atterrando...!	Col. Alec E. Freeman	Italian-language series UFO compilation film.
1974	Invasion: UFO	Col. Alec E. Freeman	UFO compilation film, known in the Italian-language series as "UFO - Annientate SHADO... Uccidete Straker... Stop".
1975	Operation Daybreak	Heinz Panwitz, Chief Investigator	
1975	Barry Lyndon	Barry's Second	
1979	Running Blind	Slade	
1979	Winterspelt	Colonel	
1981	If You Go Down in the Woods Today	Knocker	
1998	Let's Stick Together	Carter	

=== Television ===
Year	Title	Role	Notes
1965	3 Clear Sundays	Johnny May	
1965-1967	Z-Cars	Det. Insp. Brogan/Joe Carter/Harris	9 episodes
1969	The Expert	Louis Scammell	Episode: Protection
1969	Public Eye	Jakeman	Episode: "Welcome to Brighton?"
1970	Dr. Finlay's Casebook	Duncan Bradley	Episode: "A Good Prospect"
1970	Manhunt	Pierre Allard	3 episodes
1970	Randall and Hopkirk (Deceased)	Eric Jansen	Episode: "Vendetta for a Dead Man"
1970-1971	Paul Temple	Sammy Carson	11 episodes
1970-1971	UFO	Col. Alec Freeman	17 episodes
1971	Public Eye	Harry Brierly	Episode: "Come Into the Garden Rose"
1972	Home and Away	Winslow Scott	7 episodes
1972	Man at the Top	Henry Webster	2 episodes
1973-1974	Special Branch	Det. Chief Insp. Alan Craven	Seasons 3-4
1975	Churchill's People	Colonel Michelburn	Episode: "The Derry Boys"
1975	The Main Chance	Henry Kenton	Episode: "Survival"
1975	Rising Damp	Baker	Episode: "The Prowler"
1975	Some Mothers Do 'Ave' Em	Wheeler	Episode: "Learning to Drive"
1977	Don't Forget to Write!	Pierre	Episode: "Going Up in the World"
1978	The Sweeney	Vic Tolman	Episode: "Bait"
1979	Running Blind	Slade	3 episodes
1979	Tinker Tailor Soldier Spy	Mendel	7 episodes
1980	The Gentle Touch	Dave Connally	3 episodes
1982	The Chinese Detective	Jack Longmann	Episode: "Wheels Between Wheels"
1982	Minder	Frank	Episode: "Rembrandt Doesn't Live Here Any More"
1982-1983	Andy Robson	Peter Mueller	6 episodes
1984	Hammer House of Mystery and Suspense	Det. Inspector Grant	Episode: Mark of the Devil
1985	Bleak House	Ironmaster Rouncewell	2 episodes
1985	Bulman	Harry Scroop	Episode: "The Name of the Game"
1985	C.A.T.S. Eyes	Charlie Hammond	Episode: "Love Byte"
1987-1990	Home James!	Robert Palmer	25 episodes
1988	Doctor Who	George Ratcliffe	Serial: "Remembrance of the Daleks"
1993	The Upper Hand	George Carver	Episode: "Minder"
1993-1997	The Detectives	Superintendent Cottam	29 episodes
1994-2005	The Bill	Ron Davies/ Bill Pavey/ Ex DSC Charles Bennett	3 episodes
2000	Heartbeat	Ray Walker	Episode: "Against the Odds"
2000-2002	Harry and the Wrinklies	'Huggy' Bear	8 episodes
2006	Casualty	George Barron	Episode: "Needle" (final role)
