= The Champions =

British TV thriller series (1968–1969)

- Genre: Spy-fi; Science fiction thriller; Occult detective fiction; Adventure
- Created by: Dennis Spooner; Monty Berman
- Starring: Stuart Damon; Alexandra Bastedo; William Gaunt; Anthony Nicholls
- Theme music composer: Tony Hatch
- Composers: Edwin Astley; Albert Elms; Robert Farnon
- Country of origin: United Kingdom
- Original language: English
- No. of series: 1
- No. of episodes: 30

Production
- Producer: Monty Berman
- Production company: ITC Entertainment

Original release
- Network: ITV
- Release: 25 September 1968 – 30 April 1969

The Champions is a British espionage thriller, science fiction and occult detective fiction adventure television series. It was produced by Lew Grade's ITC Entertainment production company and consists of 30 episodes broadcast in the UK on ITV during 1968–1969. The series was broadcast in Canada on CTV and the US on NBC, starting in summer 1968.

== Plot ==
Agents Craig Stirling, Sharron Macready and Richard Barrett work for a United Nations law enforcement organisation called 'Nemesis', based in Geneva. Barrett is a codebreaker, Stirling a pilot and Macready a recently widowed scientist and doctor.

In the pilot episode, the team is escaping by air from a spying mission in China. Their stolen plane, damaged by gunfire during the getaway, crashes in the Himalayas. They are rescued by the residents of Shangri-La, an advanced civilisation living secretly in the mountains of Tibet, who save their lives, granting them enhanced abilities, including extrasensory powers to communicate with one another over distances (telepathy) and to foresee events (precognition), enhanced versions of the ordinary five senses, and intellectual and physical abilities reaching the fullest extent of human capabilities.

Many stories feature unusual villains, such as fascist regimes from unspecified South American countries, Nazis (a common theme of ITC 1960s and 1970s TV, in part owing to both the writers and the domestic audience having been of the war generation) or the Chinese. The villains' schemes often threaten world peace; Nemesis' brief is international, so the agents deal with threats transcending national interests. The main characters have to learn the use of their new powers as they go along, keeping what they discover secret from friend and foe alike. Each episode begins with a close-up shot of a map, showing the region in which the story is to take place, followed by a teaser sometimes prefaced by stock footage; this is followed by the title sequence. Immediately following that is a post-title vignette, in which one or more of the Champions demonstrates exceptional mental or physical abilities, often astonishing or humiliating others. In one example, Stirling participates in a sharpshooting contest. In another, Macready's car is blocked in, two laughing passing drunks try to lift it out but she goes round to the other side and pulls it out of the parking space one-handed. Paradoxically, the narration during these often-public demonstrations usually mentions the need to keep the powers a secret. The narration involved in these particular scenes is spoken by American-born actor David Bauer, who also appeared as a foreign-accented villain in the episode "The Experiment".

The only other series regular is the Champions' boss, Tremayne. He does not know that his agents have special abilities, although he does ask innocent questions about just how on their missions they managed to carry out certain tasks about which their reports were vague.

== Cast ==
William Gaunt, Stuart Damon and Alexandra Bastedo

=== Main cast ===
- Stuart Damon as Craig Stirling
- Alexandra Bastedo as Sharron Macready
- William Gaunt as Richard Barrett
- Anthony Nicholls as W.L. Tremayne.

=== Guests ===
- George Murcell as El Gaudillo
- Eric Pohlmann as Barka
- Joseph Fürst as Chislenkan
- David Lodge as Filmer
- Ric Young as Burmese Police Captain
- Michael Mellinger as Embassy Official
- Edward Brayshaw as Del Marco
- Peter Wyngarde as Dr. John Hallam
- Reg Lye as Curtis.

== Production ==
The Champions was created by Dennis Spooner and its episodes were written by individuals who had worked on other British spy series, including The Avengers and Danger Man. An unfilmed script originally intended for Danger Man was used for one episode.

The series was produced by Monty Berman, who had co-produced The Saint, Gideon's Way and numerous B movies of the 1950s. Berman used many of the same writers, directors and crew on other ITC series, including Department S, Jason King, Randall and Hopkirk (Deceased) and The Adventurer.

Owing to budget constraints, many sets were reused: three episodes were set on a submarine and three in the Arctic. Stock footage was often used. As with other ITC productions, much of the exterior action took place in and around the studio lot – in the case of The Champions, around Associated British Studios in Elstree, England. For at least one episode, "Desert Journey", foreign filming did take place, but with a second unit, and extras standing in for the main cast.

The theme music of the series was written by Tony Hatch, with Albert Elms and Edwin Astley supplying incidental music.

== Episodes ==
No.	Title	Directed by	Written by	Original release date
1	"The Beginning"	Cyril Frankel	Dennis Spooner	25 September 1968
The three Nemesis agents recover from a plane crash in the Tibetan mountains to find their injuries healed. In the course of the episode, they learn they have had new abilities bestowed on them by their rescuers, people from an ancient civilisation, and have to evade capture from the Chinese military. With Felix Aylmer, Burt Kwouk, Joseph Fürst
2	"The Invisible Man"	Cyril Frankel	Donald James	2 October 1968
The agents investigate a plot to steal the gold reserves of a bank in the City of London. With Peter Wyngarde, Aubrey Morris, Basil Dignam, James Culliford, Steve Plytas, David Prowse
3	"Reply Box No. 666"	Cyril Frankel	Philip Broadley	9 October 1968
The agents are sent to the Caribbean to investigate a newspaper advert asking for "a parrot that speaks Greek", which Tremayne has worked out is a signal for participants in an undercover operation. With Anton Rodgers, George Murcell, George Roubicek, Imogen Hassall, Niké Arrighi
4	"The Experiment"	Cyril Frankel	Philip Broadley	16 October 1968
Sharron is sent undercover to a training establishment in which a scientist is using new techniques to produce agents who have the same level of abilities as the Champions. Nemesis is interested in the organisation because one of its graduates has tried to break into a military establishment and steal secrets. With David Bauer, Nicholas Courtney, Philip Bond, Russell Waters, Madalena Nicol, Allan Cuthbertson, Caroline Blakiston, David Swift (Uncredited).
5	"Happening"	Cyril Frankel	Brian Clemens	23 October 1968
Sharron, Craig and Tremayne are in Australia observing a nuclear test. Meanwhile, Richard is trapped at ground zero with amnesia, trying to stop the men who are attempting to sabotage the test. With Jack MacGowran, Michael Gough, Grant Taylor, Bill Cummings
6	"Operation Deep Freeze"	Paul Dickson	Gerald Kelsey	30 October 1968
Craig and Richard are sent to Antarctica to investigate an unexplained nuclear explosion, and discover that an unnamed South American country is using the territory to develop its own nuclear weapon. With Patrick Wymark, Robert Urquhart, Peter Arne, Walter Gotell, George Pastell, Martin Boddey, Alan White, Derek Sydney, Dallas Cavell, Michael Godfrey
7	"The Survivors"	Cyril Frankel	Donald James	6 November 1968
The trio are sent to investigate the possibility that caches of guns have been left in Austria by the SS, and end up discovering a secret Nazi hideout in the local iron mines, complete with surviving Nazis who think the Second World War is still going on. With Clifford Evans, Donald Houston, Bernard Kay, Stephen Yardley, John Tate, Frederick Schiller
8	"To Trap a Rat"	Sam Wanamaker	Ralph Smart	13 November 1968
Using Sharron as a decoy, the agents investigate a drug-running racket in London. With Guy Rolfe, Edina Ronay, Michael Standing, Toke Townley, Kate O'Mara, John Lee, Michael Guest
9	"The Iron Man"	John Moxey	Philip Broadley	20 November 1968
This was one of the more comedic episodes. The trio are detailed to guard the former dictator of a small South American country, La Revada, who is living in exile in the South of France. This is because some of his political opponents are planning to assassinate him, which would destabilise the political situation in the region. El Caudillo (as the former dictator insists on being called) turns out to be a vainglorious, not-very-intelligent womaniser who likes to prove that he is superior to everyone around him. With George Murcell, Patrick Magee, Steven Berkoff
10	"The Ghost Plane"	John Gilling	Donald James	27 November 1968
The Champions investigate a mysterious 'ghost plane' which is both faster than anything else in the air and of unknown origin. With Andrew Keir, Dennis Chinnery, Tony Steedman, John Bryans, Hilary Tindall, Derek Murcott, Paul Grist
11	"The Dark Island"	Cyril Frankel	Tony Williamson	4 December 1968
The Champions are sent to investigate a tropical island where visitors have a history of disappearing. Coming on shore in two parties, they discover and thwart an international conspiracy to threaten world peace. With Vladek Sheybal, Alan Gifford, Ben Carruthers, Andy Ho
12	"The Fanatics"	John Gilling	Terry Nation	11 December 1968
An unknown organisation is assassinating international leaders. Richard, posing as a convicted traitor, is sent to infiltrate the organisation and try to bring it down from within. With Donald Pickering, Julian Glover, Gerald Harper, Barry Stanton
13	"Twelve Hours"	Paul Dickson	Donald James	18 December 1968
The Champions are assigned to escort an Eastern European head of state, Drobnic, on his visit to Britain. During a dive in a Scottish loch, their submarine is sabotaged and Drobnic is injured. Richard and Sharron are forced to face down a mutiny within the crew, who want to surface and save their lives; the submarine cannot be allowed to surface if Drobnic is to survive the surgery, which Sharron has performed. With Mike Pratt, Peter Howell, John Turner, John Stone, Viola Keats, Henry Gilbert, Rio Fanning, Edward Cast
14	"The Search"	Leslie Norman	Dennis Spooner	1 January 1969
After a nuclear submarine is stolen by ex-Nazis who are determined to use it to continue the war, the Champions are tasked with hunting it down. With Joseph Fürst, John Woodvine, Patricia English, Reginald Marsh, Gábor Baraker
15	"The Gilded Cage"	Cyril Frankel	Philip Broadley	8 January 1969
After burglars break into Nemesis headquarters to access information on Richard, Craig is assigned to monitor him. Richard, however, allows himself to be abducted, leaving a message for his colleague. He finds himself imprisoned in a luxurious room (the "gilded cage" of the title), where his captor (John Carson) threatens him that, unless Richard can decipher a code, a young woman, Samantha (Jennie Linden), will be killed. With John Carson, Jennie Linden, Tony Caunter, Clinton Greyn, Vernon Dobtcheff
16	"Shadow of the Panther"	Freddie Francis	Tony Williamson	15 January 1969
Whilst on holiday in Haiti, Sharron investigates a plot to brainwash important figures in the worlds of politics, science and business, apparently orchestrated by a local sorcerer, Damballa. Richard and Craig become involved later, only to discover that Sharron has apparently been discovered by the plotters and brainwashed herself. With Zia Mohyeddin, Donald Sutherland, Tony Wall, Hedger Wallace, Christopher Carlos, Tania, Kenneth Gardnier
17	"A Case of Lemmings"	Paul Dickson	Philip Broadley	22 January 1969
The trio are sent to investigate when several Interpol agents commit motiveless suicide. They discover that an Italian-American gangster forms the only connection between the agents, and set up a sting in which Craig threatens him, so as to discover his methodology. With Edward Brayshaw, John Bailey, Jeanne Roland, Michael Graham, Michael Slater, Olive McFarland, Jacques Cey, Madge Brindley
18	"The Interrogation"	Cyril Frankel	Dennis Spooner	29 January 1969
Craig is captured after a mission in Hong Kong and held in a cell where he is subject to interrogation by various cruel means. The unnamed interrogator (Colin Blakely) wants information about Craig's last mission. Despite nearing breaking point, Craig escapes the room, only to find he is at Nemesis headquarters; the interrogator is a member of Nemesis internal security, charged with finding out how Craig completed his last mission (his report had been less than clear at certain points, which were where his powers had come into play). Tremayne halts the investigation over the interrogator's protests, but the episode ends with Craig expressing bitterness towards his colleagues for their failure to intervene. All of the three are unhappy with Tremayne as well, owing to his part in the interrogation. With Colin Blakely This episode was unusual for featuring only one extra set (though it included flashbacks to earlier episodes) and for focusing mostly on one character. The last episode in the syndication package, it was intended to be the season finale; the characters are left with little if any mutual trust, which is not reflected in any other episodes.
19	"The Mission"	Robert Asher	Donald James	5 February 1969
The trio investigate an operation run by an ex-Nazi doctor who is providing plastic surgery, and hence future anonymity, for international criminals. Craig and Sharron go undercover as an Italian gangster and his moll; however, Richard is forced to move in and masquerade as a vagrant, in order to provide a matching blood group for them (because vagrants provide the raw biological material for the operation). With Dermot Kelly, Anthony Bate, Patricia Haines, Paul Hansard, Robert Russell, Harry Towb
20	"The Silent Enemy"	Robert Asher	Donald James	12 February 1969
The Champions are sent on a mission to recreate the journey of a submarine, which came into port with all of its crew dead from unknown causes. With Paul Maxwell, Marne Maitland, Esmond Knight, James Maxwell, David Blake Kelly, Rio Fanning
21	"The Body Snatchers"	Paul Dickson	Terry Nation	19 February 1969
Barrett, tipped off by a journalist contact, investigates a project in the Welsh countryside that is experimenting with freezing people at the point of death so that they can be revived once medical technology is advanced enough to help them. With Bernard Lee, Philip Locke, Ann Lynn, J. G. Devlin, Gregory Phillips, Christina Taylor, Fredric Abbott, Talfryn Thomas
22	"Get Me Out of Here!"	Cyril Frankel	Ralph Smart	26 February 1969
The agents rescue an eminent female scientist who has returned to her home country and been detained against her will by the dictatorship that runs it. This government wants her to do her work there, in order to gain reflected prestige from her medical discoveries. With Frances Cuka, Philip Madoc, Eric Pohlmann, Anthony Newlands, Godfrey Quigley, Ronald Radd, Norman Florence, Ricardo Montez
23	"The Night People"	Robert Asher	Donald James	5 March 1969
Richard and Craig investigate Sharron's disappearance while on holiday in Cornwall and come across rumours of witchcraft. This turns out to be a cover for an entirely different undertaking. With Terence Alexander, Adrienne Corri, Walter Sparrow, Michael Bilton, Jerold Wells, David Lodge, Frank Thornton, Anne Sharp
24	"Project Zero"	Don Sharp	Tony Williamson	12 March 1969
The agents are sent to investigate the disappearance of several eminent scientists—the only link is that all of them have theoretically been seconded to a non-existent "Project Zero". Richard goes undercover as an electronics expert and makes it to the underground base but is discovered and has to pose as a journalist looking for a story. Craig and Sharron are forced to follow him in. With Rupert Davies, Peter Copley, Maurice Browning, Geoffrey Chater, Jill Curzon, Nicholas Smith, Reginald Jessup, Donald Morley, Jan Holden, John Moore, John Horsley, Eric Lander, Bruce Beeby
25	"Desert Journey"	Paul Dickson	Ian Stuart Black	19 March 1969
In order to restore stability to a small Middle Eastern principality, the agents kidnap the son of the former Bey (played by Jeremy Brett), who is leading a dissolute life as an exile in Rome. Craig and Sharron fly him into the area but are forced to land due to a sand storm and have to cross the desert (the "journey" of the title) to get him to his destination. With Jeremy Brett, Roger Delgado, Reg Lye, Henry Soskin, Nik Zaran, David Prowse (uncredited), Peter Madden, Tony Cyrus, Yole Marinelli
26	"Full Circle"	John Gilling	Donald James	26 March 1969
A spy is captured at a foreign embassy but manages to dispose of the film, hiding what he was doing there. Craig is placed undercover as his cellmate so that he can arrange an escape, take the man with him, and find out who is employing him. With Patrick Allen, Jack Gwillim, Martin Benson, Gabrielle Drake, John Nettleton, James Donnelly, Lawrence James, Victor Brooks
27	"Nutcracker"	Roy Ward Baker	Philip Broadley	2 April 1969
After a senior figure in British Intelligence is brainwashed into breaking into his own secure vault (located underneath a tailor's shop) the Champions are sent to test its security and find out what happened. With Michael Barrington, John Franklyn-Robbins, William Squire, David Langton, John Bown, David Kelsey, Dervis Ward, Robert Mill
28	"The Final Countdown"	John Gilling	Gerald Kelsey	16 April 1969
Tracking an unrepentant Nazi who has been released after years in prison in East Germany, the Champions become involved in an attempt to stop him from obtaining an ex-Nazi atom bomb. With Hannah Gordon, Norman Jones, Morris Perry, Derek Newark, Alan MacNaughtan, Basil Henson, Wolf Frees, Michael Lees
29	"The Gun Runners"	John Gilling	Gerald Kelsey	23 April 1969
This was one of the few episodes that did not feature two stories running side by side. The three agents work on bringing a gunrunner to justice and recovering a consignment of Japanese rifles from the Second World War. With William Franklyn, Wolfe Morris, Nicolas Chagrin, Paul Stassino, David Lodge, Guy Deghy, Ric Young (credited as Eric Young)
30	"Autokill"	Roy Ward Baker	Brian Clemens	30 April 1969
Barka (Eric Pohlmann) is using a lethal hallucinogenic drug to brainwash Nemesis agents and use them as assassins. Tremayne is his latest target, leading Craig, Richard and Sharron to work against time to find an antidote. During their investigations, Richard is captured by Barka and subjected to the same treatment; the target he is given to eliminate is Craig. With Paul Eddington, Eric Pohlmann, Harold Innocent, Bruce Boa, Conrad Monk, Richard Owens, Rachel Herbert

== Broadcast ==
The series had three repeat runs in the UK across the ITV regions up to 1976, with additional repeats in September–October 1984 and May–August 1985. It was also regularly repeated on ITV's digital channel ITV4 until January 2011. The Champions was broadcast on BBC2 in 1995, at about the time when Gaunt was appearing in the sitcom Next of Kin, and it had at least three further repeat runs after that.

On 7 March 2021, the series began a rerun on Talking Pictures TV. The episode 'Desert Journey' was not screened in this run.

From 4 May 2021, the series was being repeated again on ITV4, the first time in 10 years. It ended on 15 June, with only 27 of the 30 episodes shown (leaving out ‘Desert Journey’, ‘The Gun Runners’ and ‘Autokill’). It was repeated again on ITV4, later in the year, this time showing 29 out of 30 episodes (yet again, leaving out 'Desert Journey'). Rewind TV started showing the series in autumn 2025 (leaving out again ’Desert Journey).

== Home media ==
Episodes of this series were released on DVD in North America by A&E Home Entertainment (under licence from Granada International Media Limited) and in the UK, where the full series has been released twice, with the most recent edition seeing Damon, Bastedo and Gaunt reunite to provide a commentary for several episodes. (Damon's role on US series General Hospital meant that Bastedo and Gaunt had to be flown to America for it.)

The series was shown in Italy in the early 1980s in syndication, under the title Tris d'Assi (Three Aces) and, more recently, in the 1990s on Canal Jimmy (Sky) but an Italian DVD collection has never been released.

In 2010, Network DVD re-released The Champions: The Complete Series as a complete DVD Region 2 box set of all episodes on nine discs, including the rare 'bookends' version of the first episode. Additionally, it released the music from the series on three CDs.

== Adaptations ==
=== Legend of the Champions ===
In 1983, ITC edited the episodes "The Beginning" and "The Interrogation" into Legend of the Champions, a feature-length film intended for overseas markets.

ITC had released several such films before (notably with The Persuaders!) however, in this case, the two episodes were not simply joined, but substantially re-edited. "The Interrogation" formed the framing story; its original broadcast form some flashback sequences (mainly from "The Beginning") had been used. These were expanded to contain almost the whole of the earlier episode. Additionally, new credits were filmed, not using any of the original actors but instead their photographs, taken at the time of the original production.

A plot change was the renaming of a character from the original version of "The Beginning" to accommodate a plot device in "The Interrogation". In "The Interrogation", Craig Stirling is ostensibly being quizzed on a character called Julius Retford, who remains unseen. For the film, the opening credits explicitly identify Retford as the character who in "The Beginning" was named Ho Ling (played by Ric Young). This allows the germ warfare theme of "The Beginning" to interlink with the sequences in "The Interrogation". Confusingly, in the end credits, Young is credited as playing 'Ho Ling', a name never used in the film version.

This release credited Stuart Damon as the star, with Alexandra Bastedo and William Gaunt receiving co-star credits. This was partly because Damon was a familiar face in U.S. daytime television by this time, and partly because "The Interrogation" is essentially a two-hander between Damon and Colin Blakely, with the rest of the regular cast appearing only briefly.

Legend of the Champions was released on DVD as part of the Network box-set.

Note: 'Bookend' sequences were shot for the first episode "The Beginning" showing Richard Barrett (William Gaunt) recording the story onto a tape recorder in Tremayne's office; this was done so that the episode could be shown out of order on repeat runs without causing any continuity problems. Both sequences were included as extras on the Network DVD box set.

=== Film ===
In November 2007, it was reported that Guillermo del Toro would produce and write a film adaptation of The Champions for United Artists. In 2008, Christopher McQuarrie was signed to co-write and co-produce the film. del Toro later stated that Tom Cruise had been attached to it.

In 2021, it was announced that Ben Stiller would star in and direct a feature film adaptation with Cate Blanchett co-starring. The film would be produced by New Republic Pictures, ITV Studios America and Dirty Films.

Ultimately, nothing came of these film projects.

=== Books ===
Paperbacks based on the TV series include:

- The Sixth Sense is Death. By John Garforth. London: Hodder Paperbacks, 1969 (a novelisation of the episodes "The Beginning" and "The Experiment")
- Lavage de Cerveau. By Pierre Salva. Paris: Presses de la Cité, 1977

=== Comic strip ===
A Champions comic strip ran in City Magazine's Joe 90 Top Secret comic from the first issue (#1, 18 January 1969) until its cancellation with #34 (6 September 1969). They also had a story in the Joe 90 Top Secret Annual 1969.
