= When the Spirit Moves You =

- Randall and Hopkirk (Deceased) episode
- Episode no.: Season 1 Episode 16
- Directed by: Ray Austin
- Written by: Tony Williamson
- Production code: 16
- Original air date: 2 January 1970

Guest appearances
- Kieron Moore; Michael Gothard; Anton Rodgers; Richard Kerley

Episode chronology
← Previous "The Man from Nowhere"	Next → "Somebody Just Walked Over My Grave"

"When the Spirit Moves You" is the sixteenth episode of the 1969 ITC British television series Randall and Hopkirk (Deceased) starring Mike Pratt and Kenneth Cope. The episode was first broadcast on 2 January 1970 on ITV and was directed by Ray Austin.

Annette Andre does not appear in this episode. Unlike "The House on Haunted Hill", the non-appearance of Andre's character Jeannie Hopkirk is not explained in this episode. At the end of this episode Andre does receive a credit despite not appearing in it. At the end of "The House on Haunted Hill", Andre received no credit.

== Synopsis ==
Jeff becomes involved with a bumbling alcoholic conman named Bream and a stash of $125,000 of stolen bonds from the United States that a criminal racket are after. Jeff goes ahead with a deal to exchange the bonds that he and Bream have for $125,000 of the criminal racket's cash. When Jeff and Bream manage to double-cross them, they turn the tables and come within seconds of blowing up Jeff with the safe that he deposited the money in.

== Overview ==
In this episode Marty finds that he is able to communicate with the alcoholic Bream (Anton Rodgers) but only when he is very drunk from whisky. This is also one of the first episodes where Marty physically threatens to haunt somebody as a traditional ghost would, in order to force him to give Jeff a helping hand.

== Cast ==
- Mike Pratt as Jeff Randall
- Kenneth Cope as Marty Hopkirk
- Anton Rodgers .... Calvin P. Bream
- Penny Brahms .... Girl in Luxury Flat
- Peter J. Elliott .... Wilks
- Michael Gothard .... Perrin
- Richard Kerley .... Sgt. Hinds
- Reg Lye .... Manny
- Anthony Marlowe .... Cranley
- Kieron Moore .... Miklos Corri
- Bill Reed .... Parkin

== Production ==
Although the 16th episode in the series, That's How Murder Snowballs was the 13th episode to be shot, filmed between November 1968 and March 1969.
