= Next of Kin (1982 film) =

- Theatrical film poster
- Directed by: Tony Williams
- Screenplay by: Michael Heath; Tony Williams
- Produced by: Robert Le Tet; Timothy White
- Starring: Jackie Kerin; John Jarratt; Gerda Nicolson; Alex Scott
- Cinematography: Gary Hansen
- Edited by: Max Lemon
- Music by: Klaus Schulze
- Production companies: The Film House; S.I.S. Productions; Filmco
- Distributed by: Roadshow Film Distributors
- Release date: 1982
- Running time: 89 minutes
- Countries: Australia; New Zealand
- Language: English
- Box office: A$228,251

Next of Kin is a 1982 psychological horror film co-written and directed by Tony Williams, and starring Jackie Kerin and John Jarratt.

== Plot ==
After her estranged mother's death, Linda Stevens inherits a rural estate called Montclare, which has been in her family for years. The rambling structure houses a long-held rest home for the elderly. Linda arrives on the same night as a new boarder, the aged Mrs. Ryan, dropped off by her son Kelvin. Shortly after Linda settles in, a resident of the home is found drowned in a bathtub.

Linda begins reading old diaries left in the house by her mother, in which she describes being unsettled in the home and believing someone is watching her. She also finds handwritten medical records for her aunt Rita, which disturbs her as she was told that Rita had been dead at the time they were written. Meanwhile, Linda reconnects with Barney, a man with whom she was romantic years prior. After the two go on a date together, Linda returns to Montclare and is notified that Lance, another resident, has suffered a debilitating stroke. Later, Linda informs Dr. Barton, the resident physician, that she is considering selling the property.

After a series of unusual incidents, Linda comes to suspect that Rita may still be alive and stalking the house, though Dr. Barton assures her that Rita died in a psychiatric hospital years prior. Upon further delving into her mother's diaries, Linda finds that there is a precedent for mysterious deaths in the retirement community, particularly an inordinate number of drownings. Convinced that Dr. Barton and another employee, Connie, are murdering residents, she flees to town on foot and locates Barney in a panic.

Barney escorts Linda back to Montclare and enters the house to obtain the diaries. Outside Linda finds Carol, a romantic rival, with her throat slashed. Linda flees into the house in search of Barney, only to find him also murdered. Upstairs, she finds Lance, conscious and able to walk. Linda ushers him outside through a window onto an emergency escape stairway. She is soon confronted by Mrs. Ryan, who is actually Rita, seeking vengeance against Linda's mother for placing her in the hospital; Rita claims that it was Linda's mother who was in fact insane. A crazed Kelvin—Rita's son (and Linda's cousin)—attacks Linda with a sledgehammer.

Linda manages to barricade herself in a bathroom, where she finds Dr. Barton's and Connie's bloodied corpses in the bathtub. She stabs Rita through the eye with the sharp handle of a comb as Rita peers through the door lock, then manages to escape by car. She arrives at the local diner nearby, where the owner's young son, Nico, is alone. The two barricade themselves in the diner, but Kelvin arrives, driving his truck through the side of the building. Using a shotgun, Linda manages to shoot and kill Kelvin. At dawn, Linda and Nico drive away as the diner becomes engulfed in flames, ignited by the petrol leaking from Kelvin's damaged truck.

== Cast ==
- Jacki Kerin as Linda Stevens
- John Jarratt as Barney
- Alex Scott as Dr. Barton
- Gerda Nicolson as Connie
- Charles McCallum as Lance
- Bernadette Gibson as Mrs. Ryan/Rita
- Robert Ratti as Kelvin
- Vince Deltito as Nico
- Tommy Dysart as Harry
- Debra Lawrance as Carol
- Matt Burns as Mr. Collins
- Kristina Marshall as Linda Stevens (age 4)
- Vic Gordon as Montclare Resident

== Production ==
Next of Kin is a psychological horror film.

It was co-written (with Michael Heath) and directed by Tony Williams, and co-produced by Robert Le Tet and Timothy White.

Music was composed by Klaus Schulze, cinematography was by Gary Hansen, and Max Lemon did the editing.

== Reception ==
The film grossed A$228,251 at the box office.

On Rotten Tomatoes the film has an approval rating of 100%, based on reviews from nine critics.

The film's pacing and atmosphere have been compared to that of Stanley Kubrick's The Shining by Quentin Tarantino.

The film was featured in the documentary Not Quite Hollywood where it was praised by Quentin Tarantino.

== Accolades ==
Award	Category	Subject	Result
AACTA Award (1982 Australian Film Institute Awards)	Best Editing	Max Lemon	Nominated
Mystfest	Special Mention	Tony Williams	Won
Sitges Film Festival	Clavell de Plata Daurada for Best Director	Tony Williams	Won
