= Randall and Hopkirk (Deceased) =

British television series (1969–1970)

- Also known as: My Partner the Ghost
- Genre: Occult detective fiction
- Created by: Dennis Spooner
- Starring: Mike Pratt; Kenneth Cope; Annette Andre
- Theme music composer: Edwin Astley
- Composer: Edwin Astley
- Country of origin: United Kingdom
- Original language: English
- No. of series: 1
- No. of episodes: 26

Production
- Producer: Monty Berman
- Running time: 49 minutes
- Production companies: Scoton; ITC Entertainment for ATV

Original release
- Network: ITV
- Release: 19 September 1969 – 13 March 1970

Randall and Hopkirk (Deceased) is a British private detective television series starring Mike Pratt and Kenneth Cope respectively as the private detectives Jeff Randall and Marty Hopkirk. The series was created by Dennis Spooner and produced by Monty Berman, and was first broadcast in 1969 and 1970. In the United States, it was given the title My Partner the Ghost.

ITC Entertainment produced a single series of 26 episodes in 1968 and 1969, which was aired from September 1969 to March 1970. The pilot episode was first broadcast in the United Kingdom on 19 September 1969 by ATV in the Midlands. London Weekend Television broadcast the pilot two days later on 21 September 1969.

The series was remade in 2000, starring Vic Reeves and Bob Mortimer.

== Plot ==
In the initial episode, "My Late Lamented Friend and Partner", Marty Hopkirk is murdered during an investigation but returns as a ghost. He chooses his partner, Jeff Randall, to be the only main character able to see or hear him, to solve his own murder. Unfortunately, Marty chooses at the end of the episode not to return to his grave before dawn and is therefore to be trapped on earth for a century. Marty's wife Jeannie continues in the series as Jeff's secretary. Later in the series, certain minor characters are also able to see Marty in various circumstances, such as mediums, drunks, or those under hypnosis.

== Production ==
=== Conception ===
The idea for the series was conceived by Dennis Spooner, who had an office adjoining producer Monty Berman at Elstree Studios. They had already collaborated on The Champions. In March 1968, the pair conceived Department S. Spooner's interest in the paranormal, inspired by several feature films, contemplated the possibility of a television series featuring a ghost, and he thought a detective series would offer greater scope for storylines.

The idea was put to head of ATV Lew Grade but he was not enthusiastic as the series lacked a leading imported American star, which he felt would inhibit overseas sales. However, the synopsis caught the eye of Ralph Smart, who had worked on The Adventures of Robin Hood, The Invisible Man, and Danger Man and he wanted to write the pilot. This convinced Lew Grade to green-light the series.

=== Casting ===
The role of Jeff Randall, originally named Steven Randall, was considered for the comedian Dave Allen who had made Tonight with Dave Allen for Lew Grade's ATV. When Dave Allen signed for the BBC, attention turned to Mike Pratt, who had appeared in a number of episodes of various ITC series, and he was deemed to be right for the part by the production team, including Cyril Frankel, creative consultant on the series.

Marty Hopkirk proved to be more difficult to cast, and several actors were considered after the creators scoured the pages of casting resources Spotlight. Cyril Frankel was at a new Italian restaurant in Soho, London and sitting at the next table was Kenneth Cope, with his wife, and Cyril Frankel thought he would be right for the part. Cyril Frankel told Monty Berman, and then directed a screen test, and Kenneth Cope got the part.

Jean Hopkirk, not in the original concept, is portrayed by Australian actress Annette Andre. She was well known to the production team, having appeared in six episodes of The Saint as well as The Baron. She had been short listed for one of the lead roles in The Champions, but lost to Alexandra Bastedo, reportedly at the whim of an American CBS executive.

=== Filming and locations ===
Filming commenced with the pilot in May 1968 with the aim to shoot a 48-minute episode over a fortnight working Monday to Friday from 8:30a.m. to 5:30p.m. with some filming on alternate Sundays. The bulk of filming with the main cast was on two sound stages at ABC Elstree in Borehamwood where Department S and other series were also in production. Establishing shots would use library footage. Location sequences were usually filmed by a second unit using stand-ins or the guest cast who were only needed for one episode filmed by one director while the main cast were completing the previous episode with another director. To keep costs down, a simple jump cut was used to make Marty Hopkirk disappear and reappear. Walking through walls was costly and time consuming using an image reflected on plain glass at an angle in front of the camera, an effect often used in the theatre called Pepper's ghost.

The exterior of the Randall & Hopkirk's office was a doorway at the side of Adam's Furniture Fabric on the corner of Kymberly Road and Springfield Road in Harrow, now completely redeveloped as St George's Shopping Centre. Jeff Randall's flat was located at Hanover House, close to the corner of St John's Wood High Street, and Jean Hopkirk's flat was on Lauderdale Road, Maida Vale, London.

Numerous country houses in the northern Greater London and Hertfordshire area were used for the external shots of the many mansions featured in the series. In the episode "For the Girl Who Has Everything", the exterior of Hilfield Castle in Aldenham was used for Kim Wentworth's (Lois Maxwell's) home. The Tudor-looking Edgwarebury Hotel on Barnet Lane in Elstree, now The Manor Elstree, was used in the episodes "Who Killed Cock Robin?" and "The House on Haunted Hill" and a plethora of other ITC series. The exterior of the Lambert Clinic in the comical episode "A Disturbing Case", written by Mike Pratt himself, is now the Institute of Grocery Distribution in Letchmore Heath, Hertfordshire. The Seaton Residence, a large white house with Doric columns at the front used in "The Smile Behind the Veil" episode is the Dyrham Park Country Club, the club house of a golf club in Galley Lane, Barnet. Woburn Abbey in Woburn, Bedfordshire, is featured in the episode "The Man from Nowhere" and is visited by Jeannie and a Marty imposter.

=== Cars ===
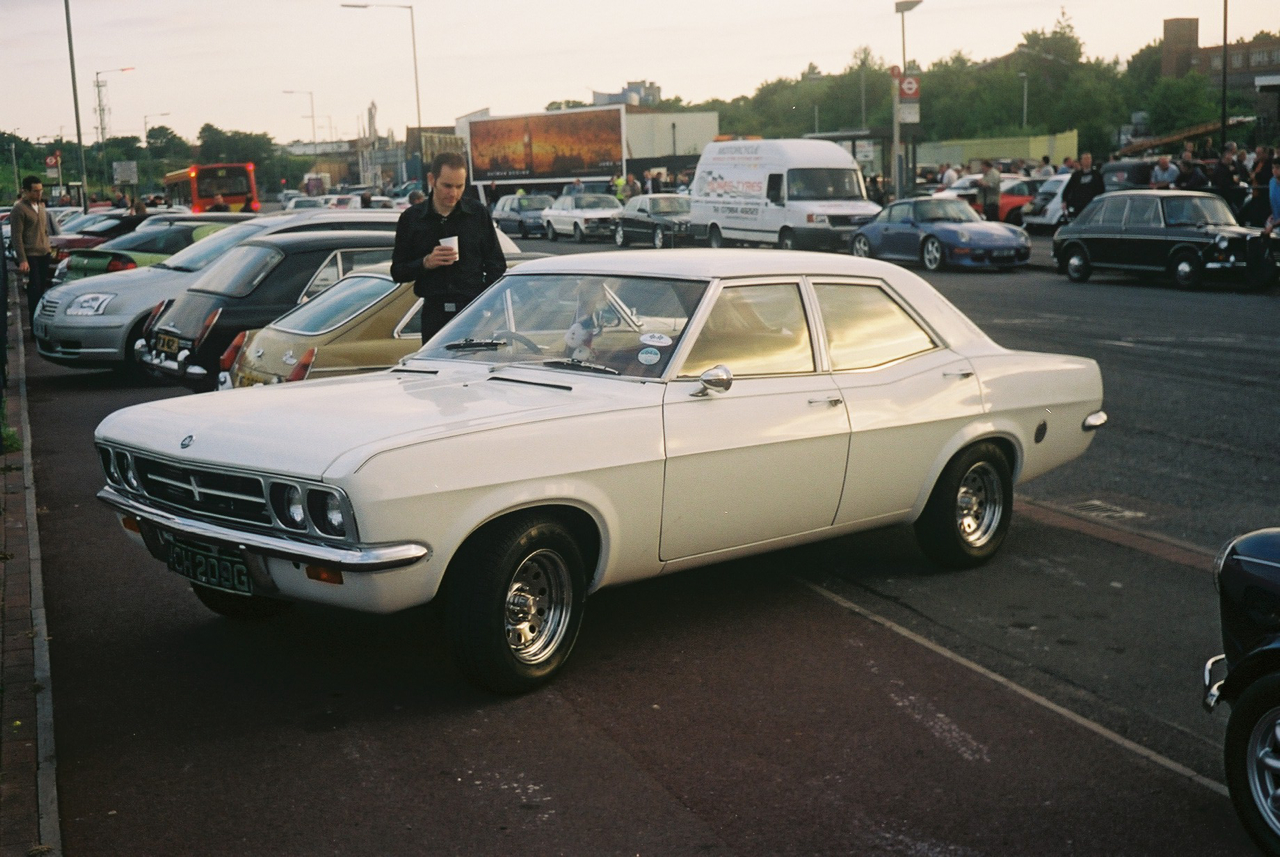
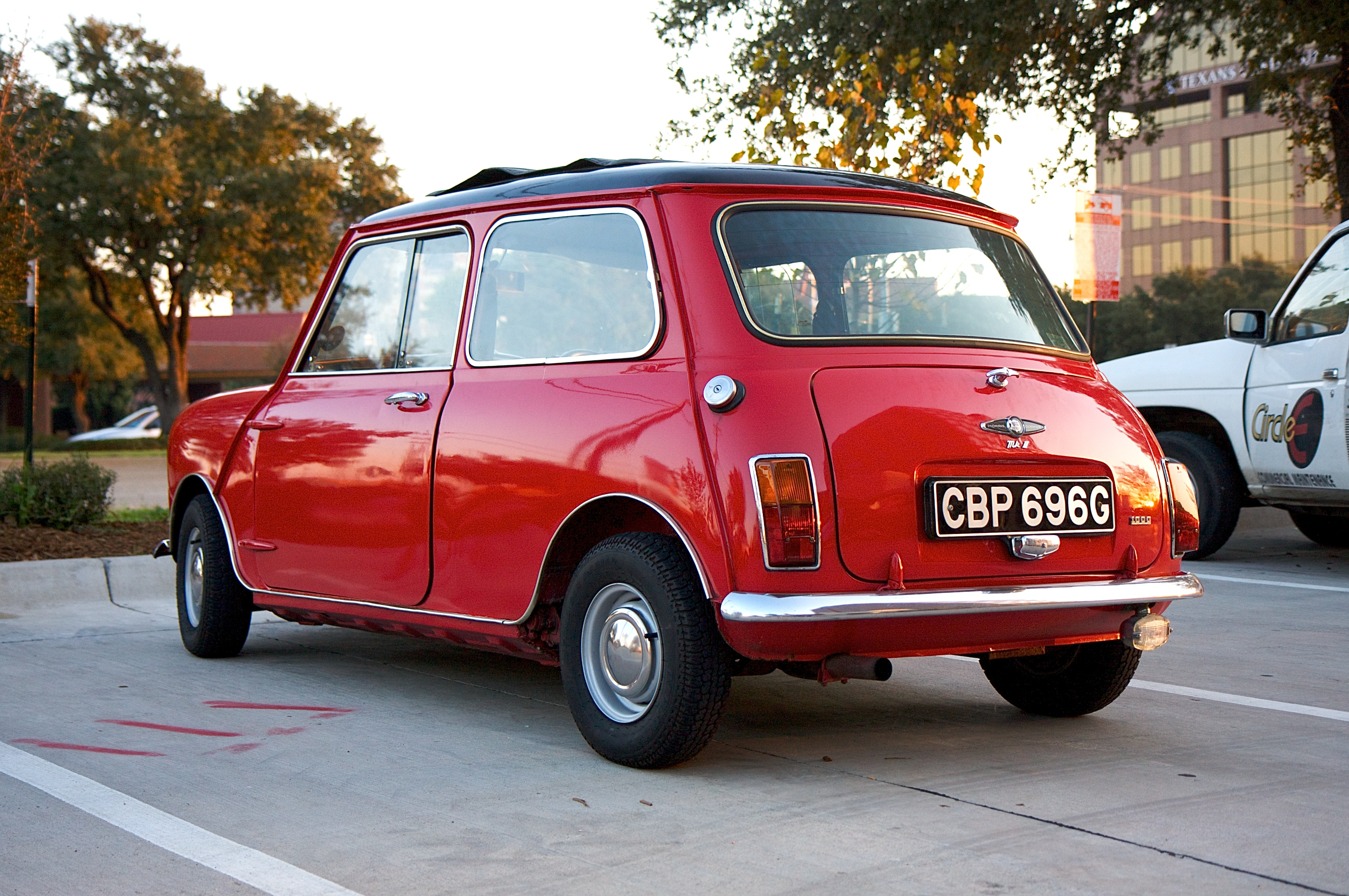
Left: white Vauxhall Victor. Right: red Mini.

The car Jeff Randall drove was a white Vauxhall Victor, with the registration number RXD 996F. It was also used in two episodes of Department S; in that series Joel Fabiani's character Stewart Sullivan drove a white Vauxhall Ventora with the registration RXD 997F. The red Mini used by Jean Hopkirk was registered in May 1964 and had been used in an episode of The Saint (1968), an episode of Department S (1969) and driven by Tony Curtis's character Danny Wilde in an episode of The Persuaders! (1970).

=== Music ===
The theme music was composed by Edwin Astley, who in the previous years had composed many themes and incidental music for film series produced and distributed by ITC and its forerunners. Astley used the harpsichord because of its distinctive sound and used the C minor key because of the "death" part in it. In all Astley composed 188 numbered cues used throughout the series. Music composed by Astley from The Champions was briefly used, as was music by Albert Elms from the same series. Music was also used by Astley from his own library of music, the Chappell library, and other music composed by Robert Farnon, Johnny Hawksworth, Sidney Torch, Vivaldi.

== Characters and cast ==
Jeff Randall

- Mike Pratt as Jeffrey "Jeff" Randall, a successful (albeit "slightly seedy" and often morally ambiguous) private detective whose success in solving mysteries becomes inevitably greater once he has the benefits and paranormal abilities of his deceased friend and partner Marty Hopkirk. Randall is short-tempered, becoming irritated with certain situations and people, particularly the ghost of Marty.
- Kenneth Cope as Martin "Marty" Hopkirk, a private detective and Jeff's friend and partner, who is murdered in the course of an investigation by being run down by a car travelling at high speed. Marty dies instantly, but returns as a ghost to help Jeff (the only living person who can see him) bring his killer to justice. Marty remains with Jeff throughout the entire series, a cynical, often perturbed character who torments Jeff as much as helps him.
- Annette Andre as Jean "Jeannie" Hopkirk, secretary at the Randall and Hopkirk private investigation office. She is the widow of Marty. Though resourceful, she can be very naïve and vulnerable, putting her own life in danger on many occasions.
- Ivor Dean as Inspector Large (5 episodes), a lugubrious police inspector, always suspicious of Randall and looking to arrest him. Their relationship is highly adversarial, though Randall eventually helps the inspector bring the real culprits to justice.
- Richard Kerley as Sergeant Hinds (3 episodes), Inspector Large's subordinate.
- Judith Arthy as Jennifer (2 episodes), the sister of Jeannie, who comes to London to visit her sister.
- Garfield Morgan (2 episodes) in different roles in each
- Michael Griffiths as Inspector Nelson (2 episodes), a police inspector who, much like Inspector Large, treats Randall as a criminal and the first suspect for various crimes.

=== Other actors ===
==== A ====
- Raymond Adamson
- Neal Arden
- Graham Armitage
- John Arnatt
- Robin Askwith
- Roger Avon
- Felix Aylmer

==== B ====
- Anthony Baird
- Simon Barnes
- Patrick Barr
- Keith Barron
- Alexandra Bastedo
- David Bauer
- Norman Beaton
- Bruce Beeby
- Michael Beint
- James Belchamber
- Francis Bennett
- Dick Bentley
- Harold Berens
- Paul Bertoya
- Michael Bird
- Norman Bird
- Caroline Blakiston
- Joby Blanshard
- Brian Blessed
- John Bott
- Tom Bowman
- John Boxer
- Penny Brahms
- Edward Brayshaw
- James Bree
- Susan Broderick
- Ray Brooks
- Arthur Brough
- A. J. Brown
- Gabrielle Brune
- John Bryans
- Denise Buckley
- Keith Buckley
- Alfred Burke
- Jeremy Burnham
- Ian Butler

==== C ====
- Edward Caddick
- Richard Caldicot
- Joyce Carey
- David Cargill
- Veronica Carlson
- Martin Carrol
- Dave Carter
- Ann Castle
- John Cazabon
- Clive Cazes
- Peter Cellier
- Nicolas Chagrin
- Tricia Chapman
- Tom Chatto
- Basil Clarke
- Carol Cleveland
- Linda Cole
- Michael Coles
- John Collin
- Patrick Connor
- George A. Cooper
- Billy Cornelius
- Adrienne Corri
- Nicholas Courtney
- Clifford Cox
- Tracey Crisp
- Roger Croucher
- James Culliford
- Roland Curram

==== D ====
- Henry Davies
- Noel Davis
- Anne De Vigier
- Hans De Vries
- Roger Delgado
- Roy Desmond
- Arnold Diamond
- Basil Dignam
- Carol Dilworth
- Eric Dodson
- James Donnelly
- Rosemary Donnelly
- David Downer
- Terry Duggan
- William Dysart

==== E ====
- Clifford Earl
- Meredith Edwards
- Christopher Eedy
- Peter Jay Elliott
- Eva Enger
- Norman Eshley
- Clifford Evans
- Tenniel Evans

==== F ====
- Max Faulkner
- Gerald Flood
- David Forbes
- Michael Forrest
- Dudley Foster
- Grazina Frame
- John Fraser
- Liz Fraser

==== G ====
- Chris Gannon
- John Garvin
- Sue Gerrard
- Alan Gifford
- Michael Goldie
- Michael Goodliffe
- Howard Goorney
- Romo Gorrara
- Michael Gothard
- Michael Gover
- Michael Graham
- Danny Green
- Earl Green
- Keith Grenville
- Michael Gwynn

==== H ====
- Patricia Haines
- John Hallam
- Olivia Hamnett
- Doris Hare
- Juliet Harmer
- John Harvey
- Robin Hawdon
- David Healy
- Thomas Heathcote
- Maurice Hedley
- Drewe Henley
- Patrick Holt
- George Howe
- Stuart Hoyle
- John Hughes
- Geoffrey Hughes
- Peter Hughes
- Harry Hutchinson

==== I ====
- Barrie Ingham
- Harold Innocent

==== J ====
- Freda Jackson
- Philip James
- David Jason
- Clare Jenkins
- Peter Jesson
- Robin John
- Dudley Jones
- John Glyn-Jones
- Peter Jones
- Patrick Jordan

==== K ====
- Bernard Kay
- Dermot Kelly
- William Kendall
- John Kidd
- Geoff King

==== L ====
- Ronald Lacey
- Charles Lamb
- Jack Lambert
- Duncan Lamont
- Peter Lawrence
- George Lee
- Phillip Lennard
- Valerie Leon
- Sue Lloyd
- Charles Lloyd-Pack
- Harry Locke
- David Lodge
- Maggie London
- Bessie Love
- Olga Lowe
- Cyril Luckham
- Reg Lye

==== M ====
- Victor Maddern
- Philip Madoc
- Marne Maitland
- Marie Makino
- Dolores Mantez
- Anthony Marlowe
- Makki Marseilles
- Reginald Marsh
- Lois Maxwell
- Paul Maxwell
- Jack MacGowran
- Alan MacNaughtan
- Neil McCallum
- Neil McCarthy
- Stanley Meadows
- Mary Merrall
- Jane Merrow
- William Mervyn
- Billy Milton
- Kieron Moore
- Charles Morgan
- Donald Morley
- George Murcell

==== N ====
- Gwen Nelson
- Patrick Newell

==== O ====
- Brian Oulton
- Richard Owens

==== P ====
- Ron Pember
- Richard Pescud
- Terence Plummer
- Nosher Powell

==== R ====
- Carol Rachelle
- Ronald Radd
- Michael Radford
- John Rae
- Michael Rathborne
- Bill Reed
- Geoffrey Reed
- Cyril Renison
- Marjorie Rhodes
- John Richmond
- Michael Ripper
- Colin Rix
- Anton Rodgers
- Edina Ronay
- Adrian Ropes
- Jan Rossini
- Robert Russell
- Madge Ryan
- Paddy Ryan

==== S ====
- Andrew Sachs
- Anthony Sagar
- Leslie Schofield
- Alex Scott
- George Sewell
- Cyril Shaps
- Ann Sharp
- John Sharp
- Michael Sheard
- David Sinclair
- Kevin Smith
- Walter Sparrow
- William Squire
- Tony Steedman
- Peter Stephens
- David Stoll
- John Styles
- Dudley Sutton
- Ingrid Sylvester

==== T ====
- Larry Taylor
- Nigel Terry
- Tony Thawnton
- Hilary Tindall
- John A. Tinn
- Frederick Treves

==== V ====
- Colin Vancao
- Peter Vaughan
- Sue Vaughan
- Don Vernon

==== W ====
- John Walker
- Gary Watson
- Kenneth Watson
- David Webb
- Timothy West
- Phillip Weston
- Les White
- Frank Windsor
- Beverly Winn
- Hilary Wontner
- Betty Woolfe
- Jack Woolgar
- Katya Wyeth

==== Y ====
- Jeremy Young
- Raymond Young

==== Z ====
- Nik Zaran

== Episodes ==
Airdates given here are for London Weekend Television. It was the only ITV region to screen all 26 episodes without breaks in transmission. Other ITV regions varied airdates and transmission order.

Filming took place between May 1968 and July 1969.

No.	Title	Directed by	Written by	Original release date	Prod. code
1	"My Late Lamented Friend and Partner"	Cyril Frankel	Ralph Smart	21 September 1969	4001
Private Investigator Marty Hopkirk is murdered by the husband of a client but returns as a ghost to help his business partner Jeff Randall bring the man responsible for his murder to justice.
2	"A Disturbing Case"	Ray Austin	Mike Pratt and Ian Wilson	28 September 1969	4022
Concerned for Jeff's mental health, Jeannie sends Jeff to Dr. Conrad at the Lambert Clinic who it turns out is the mastermind of a series of robberies of his patients using hypnotic suggestion, forcing Marty to try to find a way to break Jeff from his control before Jeff has been so severely hypnotized that he loses the ability to see Marty. David Bauer stars.
3	"All Work and No Pay"	Jeremy Summers	Donald James	5 October 1969	4012
Two eccentric conmen brothers (The Foster Brothers) who claim to be spiritualists try to convince Jeannie that Marty is haunting her as a poltergeist using electronic equipment.
4	"Never Trust a Ghost"	Leslie Norman	Tony Williamson	12 October 1969	4014
Two enemy agents murder a senior British Secret Service official and his wife and act as their impostors in their own home to steal important documents.
5	"That's How Murder Snowballs"	Paul Dickson	Ray Austin	19 October 1969	4011
When a theatre performer is murdered by a loaded prop gun during one of his acts, Jeff joins the theatre as a mind reader to investigate his murder and hunt the killer. David Jason appears as Abel.
6	"Just for the Record"	Jeremy Summers	Donald James	26 October 1969	4019
Aristocrat Harold Pargiter and fellow Lords rob the British vault for a document proving that his family titles and deeds were stolen by King John in the 13th century and his succession to the throne. Starring Ronald Radd.
7	"Murder Ain't What it Used to Be!"	Jeremy Summers	Tony Williamson	2 November 1969	4024
Notorious American crime boss Paul Kirstner travels to London for "business" and hires Randall to take care of his daughter. However his wicked past and his haunting by the 1920s Chicago gangster Bugsy catches up with him.
8	"Whoever Heard of a Ghost Dying?"	Ray Austin	Tony Williamson	9 November 1969	4010
Knowing about Marty, a crime syndicate in disguise hire Jeff to keep surveillance on a gang of criminals (themselves), knowing that he will use Marty. Using an elderly psychic they detect Marty's presence, and deliberately mislead Jeff and the police.
9	"The House on Haunted Hill"	Ray Austin	Tony Williamson	16 November 1969	4021
Jeff sends Marty to investigate a supposedly-haunted mansion, Merston Manor, for a Mr. Webster, while Jeff investigates a diamond theft from Mortland. The sales director of Mortland, Mr. Previss, threatens Jeff, then offers him £5000 to close the case. Jeff attempts to expose Previss, but Previss reveals he has kidnapped Jeannie's sister, Jenny, to ensure he cooperates. Webster contacts Jeff to ask why Jeff's car, which Jenny was using, is parked outside the Manor. Jeff realizes that Jenny has been taken there, and joins Marty to investigate. They find out that the house is a front for a diamond-fencing organization. Jeff is caught at the mansion by the gang, while Marty finds a psychic group meeting close by and is able to obtain assistance to rescue him. (Jeannie Hopkirk does not appear in this episode.)
10	"When did You Start to Stop Seeing Things?"	Jeremy Summers	Tony Williamson	23 November 1969	4018
Jeff is hired by a company to find out who is leaking information to stock market speculators. Finding Jeff acting suspiciously out of character – and unable to see Marty – Marty finds out that the real Jeff has been captured and that the fake Jeff is an impostor, using his status to conduct murders of financial personnel. Marty uses a hypnotist to save the day.
11	"The Ghost who Saved the Bank at Monte Carlo"	Jeremy Summers	Tony Williamson	30 November 1969	4023
Marty's Aunt Clara hires Jeff as a bodyguard for a trip to Monte Carlo where she plans to win £100,000 using her self-devised gambling system. Closely followed and watched by several different gangs, they only lose their would-be robbers through Marty manipulating the final game of roulette, losing the money.
12	"For the Girl who Has Everything"	Cyril Frankel	Donald James	7 December 1969	4003
Jeff is hired by a ghost hunter to investigate at a manor where the lady appears to be haunted. When the ghost hunter is murdered whilst on night watch, Jeff investigates. When the man of the house is shot by his wife believing she saw a ghost, Jeff becomes suspicious and discovers that it was part of her plan to get rid of her draining husband and leave the country with her butler toyboy. Lois Maxwell appears as Kim Wentworth. Carol Cleveland appears as Laura Slade.
13	"But What a Sweet Little Room"	Roy Ward Baker	Ralph Smart	14 December 1969	4002
Jeff investigates the disappearance of a young heiress's aunt. When the aunt is then found killed by a hit-and-run driver, he is led to a medium previously visited by the aunt and uses Jeannie as a decoy to foil a thieving operation in which middle class men rob wealthy widows by murdering them in the room of the episode title, which is then revealed to be a gas chamber in disguise.
14	"Who Killed Cock Robin?"	Roy Ward Baker	Tony Williamson	21 December 1969	4006
In this murder mystery, Jeff is hired by a large estate manager to investigate a series of bird shootings in the manor aviary. Under the terms of the will of the manor's late owner, the estate is being held in trust for as long as the birds live (which could be twenty years or more), and will be divided up equally among the surviving relatives only when all the birds are dead. While Jeff keeps guard of the valuable birds, he discovers that members of the family of the manor are being murdered one by one, gradually narrowing down the suspects, leaving Jeff with the surprising culprit. Cyril Luckham appears as Laverick. Jane Merrow appears as Sandra Joyce.
15	"The Man from Nowhere"	Robert Tronson	Donald James	28 December 1969	4016
A man enters Jeannie's life pretending that he is Marty returned from the dead. As he gradually builds Jeannie's trust with his alarming knowledge of Marty's life, Jeff, suspicious from the beginning finds that he is a runaway member of a gang and has taken Jeannie to the Cotswolds where she and Marty had their honeymoon, to dig up something of the past.
16	"When the Spirit Moves You"	Ray Austin	Tony Williamson	2 January 1970	4013
Jeff becomes involved with a conman and a stash of $125,000 of stolen bonds from the United States that a criminal racket are after. Anton Rodgers appears as Calvin P. Bream. (Jeannie Hopkirk does not appear in this episode.)
17	"Somebody Just Walked Over My Grave"	Cyril Frankel	Donald James	9 January 1970	4025
Marty finds somebody digging around his grave. He sends Jeff to investigate the cemetery and Jeff in doing so is knocked unconscious several times by a masked 18th-century axe wielder. Suspecting the gardener, Jeff accepts a job for a wealthy man in the nearby mansion and stumbles on an intricate plot to kidnap his insane agoraphobic son through a tunnel and pretending to hold him to ransom. It is all part of a plot to inherit his father's fortune but when he marries his young housekeeper the plan is thwarted. Geoffrey Hughes appears as Harper. Andrew Sachs has a small role as the English commentator during the first leg of the international football match that Marty goes to watch.
18	"Could You Recognise the Man Again?"	Jeremy Summers	Donald James	16 January 1970	4020
When Jeff and Jeannie find a dead body in their car, unknown to them at the time that the man they met outside was a killer, Jeannie is held hostage to keep Randall from confessing to the police and giving a testimony in court. And even the ghostly Marty can't locate her until the very last minute.
19	"A Sentimental Journey"	Leslie Norman	Donald James	23 January 1970	4004
A reluctant Jeff agrees to take a valuable item worth £10,000 from Glasgow to London on the overnight express. When the consignment turns out to be an attractive blonde, Jeff initially concedes that the assignment is to his liking. Now gradually becoming suspicious it turns out the blonde is a traitor involved in stealing a highly valuable postage stamp. (Jeannie Hopkirk does not appear in this episode.)
20	"Money to Burn"	Ray Austin	Donald James	30 January 1970	4015
Randall is invited by a dodgy friend to take part in a money salvaging operation whereby £500,000 of old money is to be incinerated but replaced with newspaper pieces. Not informing the police or accepting any part in it, Randall watches from a nearby street and is caught by the police and imprisoned. His lady friend lawyer tracks down the friend at his London club finding the real culprits are his female dancers, freeing Randall.
21	"The Ghost Talks"	Cyril Frankel	Gerald Kelsey	6 February 1970	4026
With Jeff in a hospital bed with an arm and a leg in plaster, having fallen off a balcony while attempting to apprehend a safe-cracker, Marty seizes the opportunity to tell him about a spy drama that he handled alone (Jeff being out of town at the time) while he was still alive, involving a corrupt MI5 official and spy ring, the details of which he had never revealed before. This episode was the final episode to be filmed.
22	"It's Supposed to be Thicker than Water"	Leslie Norman	Donald James	13 February 1970	4008
Playing postman to deliver an envelope to an escaped convict strikes Jeff as simple until he finds out it contains an invitation to murder; before long his own life is on the line.
23	"The Trouble with Women"	Cyril Frankel	Tony Williamson	20 February 1970	4009
Jeff is hired by a woman and is deliberately set up her husband's murder. In disguise, she misleads Randall with her club owner boyfriend she is secretly having an affair with, almost leading to his shooting at a quarry.
24	"Vendetta for a Dead Man"	Cyril Frankel	Donald James	27 February 1970	4017
A vengeance-seeking escaped convict decides that since Marty Hopkirk, the man who put him behind bars is dead, then his widow Jeannie will have to suffer. George Sewell and Timothy West appear as Eric Jansen and Sam Grimes respectively.
25	"You Can Always Find a Fall Guy"	Ray Austin	Donald James	6 March 1970	4005
Jeff is hired to retrieve stolen funds by a nun, only to discover the nun is not what she seems to be and he is being set up.
26	"The Smile Behind the Veil"	Jeremy Summers	Gerald Kelsey	13 March 1970	4007
Only a ghost would notice the smile behind the veil of a funeral mourner. Marty stumbles upon a hidden murder mystery.

== Broadcast ==
American titlecard

The 26 episodes were broadcast in the UK between 26 September 1969 and 31 July 1971; ATV delayed their initial transmission of the last five episodes after 21 episodes had been transmitted. In Canada it aired on CTV in April 1971, and in the United States it was syndicated from 1974 to 1983 under the title My Partner the Ghost. The series has been shown in 2020 in the UK on the Sony Channel, and again in 2022 on the channel Great! TV. As of January 2023, all episodes are available on ITV's free-to-air on-demand service ITVX, and BritBox.

== Home media ==
On October 2, 2017, the complete series of Randall And Hopkirk (Deceased) was released on Blu-ray in the UK by a company called Network. It was newly remastered to HD from the original 35mm element prints. Though listed as Region B, the discs are actually Region A/B/C or Region Free, meaning they will also play in American Blu-ray players. The episodes on the discs are listed in production order instead of the air date order.

== Remakes ==
In 2000–2001, the series was remade by Working Title Films for the BBC with a more elaborate storyline, starring Vic Reeves as Hopkirk (once again in a white suit) and Bob Mortimer as Randall, with Emilia Fox as Jeannie. Two series were made. The show was produced and primarily written by Charlie Higson, who also directed some episodes, and featured numerous writers including Gareth Roberts, Mark Gatiss, Paul Whitehouse and Jeremy Dyson. The premise of the show was the same, but the circumstances of Hopkirk's death were changed.

On 10 May 2010, the SyFy Channel announced that it had secured the rights to Randall & Hopkirk (Deceased) and were looking to develop a pilot, and in January 2011, Entertainment Weekly announced that Jane Espenson and Drew Z. Greenberg would be writing a pilot for SyFy. Espenson told io9 that "The version we're proposing is quite different in tone and content from the original." She added, "We took the basic premise of a Ghost Detective and his still-living partner and invented our own take on it."

== See also ==
- List of ghost films
