= Frank Middlemass =

English actor (1919–2006)

- Photo: Don McPhee, 1982
- Born: Francis George Middlemass; 28 May 1919; Eaglescliffe, County Durham, England
- Died: 8 September 2006 (aged 87); Northwood, London, England
- Occupation: Actor
- Years active: 1957–2005

Lieutenant-Colonel Francis George Middlemass (28 May 1919 – 8 September 2006) was an English actor, who even in his early career played older roles. He is best remembered for his television roles as Rocky Hardcastle in As Time Goes By, Algy Herries in To Serve Them All My Days, and Dr. Alex Ferrenby in 20 episodes of Heartbeat. Middlemass was also active in the Royal Shakespeare Company, and was the fourth and final actor to play Dan Archer in The Archers.

== Early life ==
Middlemass was born in Eaglescliffe, County Durham, the son of a shipping company director. He was brought up in Newcastle upon Tyne, and educated in Stockton-on-Tees. He entered the army at the age of nineteen and was wounded in the Dunkirk retreat. He left the army when he was 30 and was by then a lieutenant colonel.

Middlemass started his acting career in rep in Penzance, Cornwall and then went on to join the Old Vic Company. While with them he toured North and South America, Australia, New Zealand, Israel, Lebanon, Russia, Poland and the Far East, and performed in Twelfth Night opposite Vivien Leigh. During the 1960s, he toured with Ian McKellen's Actors' Company and performed at the Nottingham Playhouse. He performed opposite Peter O'Toole in Waiting for Godot.

Middlemass's first television role was in 1958, in Dixon of Dock Green. His other early television appearances included Z-Cars; Softly, Softly; The Avengers and Jackanory. During the 1970s and 1980s he appeared in Doctor at Large; War and Peace (a memorable performance as Mikhail Kutuzov); Crown Court; Last of the Summer Wine; Ripping Yarns (Murder at Moorstone's Manor); Upstairs, Downstairs; Poldark (1975); Fall of Eagles (as Russian Prime Minister Pyotr Stolypin); The Sweeney and Emmerdale Farm.

Middlemass played Sir Charles Lyndon in Stanley Kubrick's Barry Lyndon (1975).

== Television ==
Middlemass played the philandering butcher Mr. Lyon in the final episode of the third series of Upstairs, Downstairs in 1973, but it was not until 1980, when he appeared in the post-World War I drama To Serve Them All My Days, that he first took a leading role in a British series.

Middlemass followed this up with a notable performance in the BBC Television Shakespeare production as The Fool to Michael Hordern's King Lear, as Henry Baker in The Blue Carbuncle episode of The Adventures of Sherlock Holmes in 1984 and Brezhnev in Tom Stoppard's Squaring the Circle. He went on to play minor characters in Yes Minister; Winston Churchill: The Wilderness Years (as Lord Derby); Juliet Bravo; Only When I Laugh; All in Good Faith; Yes, Prime Minister; Oliver Twist (as Mr. Brownlow); Sherlock Holmes and the Leading Lady; and Miss Marple, in the 1989 episode "A Caribbean Mystery" (as Major Palgrave).

In 1989 Middlemass recorded a role as a choirmaster (similar to his role in the Children's Film Unit's A Swarm in May, listed below) for the Christmas ghost story Haunting Harmony; this was a co-production made chiefly for export and shown in Canada and Ireland at Christmas 1990, but not transmitted in Britain until 1993 in a late-night slot. From 1992 to 1993, he appeared in twenty episodes of the police drama Heartbeat as Dr. Alex Ferrenby.

Following that in 1993, Middlemass first appeared in the sitcom As Time Goes By as Rocky Hardcastle, a role that continued regularly until 2002, and then also in the 2005 two-part reunion specials, his final television appearance. He appeared in both British TV adaptations of The Adventures of Sherlock Holmes, "The Blue Carbuncle" playing Peterson in the BBC adaptation and Henry Baker on the Granada TV series.

== Other work ==
Middlemass also appeared on radio, most notably playing patriarch Dan Archer, the fourth actor to play the role, in the long-running radio soap opera The Archers. He played this role from 1982 until 1986, when the character was killed off.

Middlemass's voice work includes the albums and radio plays: Carol and the Advent Calendar, The Hitchhiker's Guide to the Galaxy and Hordes of the Things.

Middlemass also made the BBC Radio appeal for Headway, the National Head Injuries Association. He raised a substantial amount of money; letters from admirers came along with some of the cheques.

Middlemass also appeared in films, including roles in Otley (1968), Frankenstein Must Be Destroyed (1969), Say Hello to Yesterday (1970), Madame Sin (1972), Barry Lyndon (1975), The Island (1980), as the voice of the Caterpillar in Dreamchild (1985), and Mrs Caldicot's Cabbage War (2002).

Middlemass joined the Royal Shakespeare Company in 1984 and his Shakespearean roles included Friar Lawrence in Romeo and Juliet, Quince in A Midsummer Night's Dream and Holofernes in Love's Labour's Lost. Middlemass also appeared widely in classic plays such as Rosmersholm, Heartbreak House and You Never Can Tell.

== Later years ==
Even in his eighties, Middlemass was still performing on stage, notably in The Importance of Being Earnest and toured with a one-man show called Frankly Speaking. In his final years, he made appearances in Kavanagh QC, Casualty, The 10th Kingdom, Doctors and Midsomer Murders ("Midsomer Rhapsody", 2005). As Time Goes By returned for two reunion specials, aired at Christmas 2005, and they were his final television appearances. Middlemass never married, and for forty years he had a room in the house of his close friend, actor Geoffrey Toone, who died in 2005 after spending some time resident at Denville Hall. "To their general amusement", they were often mistaken to be lovers, but in fact were not. Middlemass died, aged 87, in Northwood, London.

== Filmography ==
Year	Title	Role	Notes
1969	Otley	Bruce	
1969	Frankenstein Must Be Destroyed	Guest - Plumber	
1971	Say Hello to Yesterday	Station Master	
1972	Madame Sin	Dr. Henriques	
1975	Barry Lyndon	Sir Charles Lyndon	
1980	The Island	Windsor	
1983	A Swarm in May	Dr. Sunderland	
1985	Dreamchild	Caterpillar	Voice
1991	The Lost Language of Cranes	Alex	
2002	Mrs Caldicot's Cabbage War	Bernard	
