= Gwen Nelson =

English actress (1901–1990)

- Born: Gwendoline Alexandra Nelson; 30 June 1901; Muswell Hill, Middlesex, England
- Died: 15 October 1990 (aged 89); Long Melford, Suffolk, England
- Occupation: Actress

Gwendoline Alexandra Nelson (30 June 1901 – 15 October 1990) was an English actress who was a member of the Royal Shakespeare Company and the Royal Court Theatre Company.

Born in Muswell Hill, Middlesex, she originally intended to be a singer, and made her West End musical debut in Tough at the Top at the Adelphi Theatre in July 1949. She went on to act in Eleanor Farjeon's The Silver Curlew at London's Arts Theatre (1949), And So To Bed at the New Theatre (1951), Oh, My Papa at the Garrick Theatre (1957), Virtue in Danger (1963), All in Love at The May Fair Theatre (1964), and Saved at the Royal Court Theatre (1965). In 1976 she appeared in a revival of Arnold Ridley's The Ghost Train at the Old Vic Theatre in London with Wilfrid Brambell, James Villiers, Geoffrey Davies, Allan Cuthbertson and Judy Buxton. In 1981 she acted in Rose by Andrew Davies at the Richmond Theatre in Surrey with Honor Blackman and Hilda Braid.

Her television appearances included Z-Cars (1962–72), No Hiding Place (1960–64), ITV Playhouse (1969-1980), Randall and Hopkirk (Deceased) (1970) (in the episode The Trouble with Women), Catweazle (1970–71), Jude the Obscure (1971), Callan (1972), Clochemerle (1972), Steptoe and Son (1974), Looking For Clancy (1975), Juliet Bravo (1981), Terry and June (1983), Shine on Harvey Moon (1984), Casualty (1988), Clarence (1988), Hill Street Blues (1989), and Ruth Rendell Mysteries (1989).

She acted in the films Ah, Wilderness! (1938), Laugh With Me (1938), The Teckman Mystery (1954), Tunes of Glory (1960), A Kind of Loving (1962), Stolen Hours (1963), Doctor Zhivago (1965), The Reckoning (1969), Staircase (1969), Say Hello to Yesterday (1971), Love Among the Ruins (1975), It Shouldn't Happen to a Vet (1976), The Last Remake of Beau Geste (1977), National Lampoon's European Vacation (1985) and 84 Charing Cross (1987). Her last appearance was in an episode of The Bill in 1989. She died of natural causes in Long Melford, Suffolk, aged 89.

== Filmography ==
=== Film ===
- Ah, Wilderness! (1938) - Aunt Lily (1939 TV play)
- Laugh With Me (1938) - Ann Bonnington (TV play)
- The Teckman Mystery (1954) - Duty woman
- The Entertainer (1960)
- Tunes of Glory (1960) - Provost's Wife
- The Kitchen (1961) - 8th Waitress
- A Kind of Loving (1962) - Mrs. Brown
- Don't Talk to Strange Men (1962) - Mrs. Mason
- Stolen Hours (1963) - Hospital Sister
- The Three Lives of Thomasina (1963) - Ms. McCloud
- Doctor Zhivago (1965) - Female Janitor
- Staircase (1969) - Matron
- The Reckoning (1970) - Marler's Mother
- Say Hello to Yesterday (1971) - Char
- Something to Hide (1972) - 2nd Old Lady
- Love Among the Ruins (1975) - Hermione Davis
- It Shouldn't Happen to a Vet (1976) - Mrs. Kirby
- The Last Remake of Beau Geste (1977) - Lady in Courtroom
- National Lampoon's European Vacation (1985) - Hotel Manager's Mother
- 84 Charing Cross (1987) - Bill's Great Aunt

=== Television ===
- Z-Cars (1962–72)
- No Hiding Place (1960–64)
- ITV Playhouse (1969-1980)
- Randall and Hopkirk (Deceased) (1970) (episode: "The Trouble with Women") - Mrs. Halloway
- Catweazle (1970–71)
- Jude the Obscure (1971)
- Callan (1972)
- Clochemerle (1972)
- ...And Mother Makes Three (1972-1973)
- Steptoe and Son (1974)
- ...And Mother Makes Five (1974)
- Looking for Clancy (1975) - Meg Mace
- Juliet Bravo (1981)
- Terry and June (1983)
- Shine on Harvey Moon (1984)
- Casualty (1988)
- Clarence (1988) (episode 6) - Mrs Titheridge
- Hill Street Blues (1989)
- Ruth Rendell Mysteries (1989)
- The Bill (1989)

== Theatre ==
- Tough at the Top (1949) at the Adelphi Theatre
- The Silver Curlew (1949) at London's Arts Theatre
- And So to Bed (1951) at New Theatre
- All on a Summer's Day (1954) at St. Mary's Hall, Edinburgh for Edinburgh Festival
- Oh, My Papa (1957) at Garrick Theatre
- Virtue in Danger (1963)
- All in Love (1964) at The May Fair Theatre
- Saved (1965) at Royal Court Theatre
- The Ghost Train (1976) at Old Vic Theatre
- Rose (1961) at Richmond Theatre, Surrey
- The Chairs (1980) at Royal Exchange, Manchester
