= Edward Caddick =

English TV actor (1931–2017)

- Born: Edward George Caddick; 21 June 1931; Finsbury, London, England
- Died: 9 June 2017 (aged 85); Australian Capital Territory, Australia
- Occupations: Television actor, writer, teacher
- Spouse: Loelia Kidd (m. 1963; died 2007)

Edward Caddick (21 June 1931 – 9 June 2017) was an English television actor. He appeared in many British and Australian television series and films, which include Doctor Who, The Vulture, The Avengers, Department S, Robbery Under Arms, Playing Beatie Bow and others.

His theatre work included "King John", "The Royal Hunt of the Sun", "The Master Builder" and other plays.

Caddick was educated at the Royal Central School of Speech and Drama, graduating in 1955. In the mid-1960s, he penned two novels: Paddy on Sundays (1965, about young evacuees during WWII) and Hannah and the Peacocks (1966, about a young couple trying to find themselves). By the early 1970s, he had given up acting to become a teacher and soon emigrated to Australia. There, Caddick worked as a radio actor and writer, penning scripts for The Sunday Play, with a brief return to screen acting in the 1980s.

== Acting credits ==
Production	Notes	Role
Armchair Theatre	"The King of Iceland" (1957); "The One Eyed Monster" (1966)	Man in a Raincoat; Mulberry
The Rag Trade	"Christmas Box" (1961)	Postman
Drama 61-67	"Drama '63: Dead Darling" (1963); "Drama '66: Don Quixote Go Home" (1966)	Maurice Patmore; Methodist minister
Contract to Kill	Unknown episode (1965)	Graeber
Londoners	"Joe Nobody" (1965)	Mr. Gray
Hereward the Wake	"The King's Vengeance" (1965)	First Gamekeeper
Doctor Who	3 episodes: "The Savages" (1966)	Wylda
The Vulture	Film (1967)	Melcher, the Sexton
The Avengers	"Escape in Time" (1967)	Sweeney
Stiff Upper Lip	TV Movie (1967)	Drage
Point Counter Point	5 episodes (1968)	Mark Rampion
Champion House	"Pilot Error" (1968)	Philip Campbell
Thirty-Minute Theatre	"The Flag" (1968)	Janos
Softly, Softly	"How's the Wife Then?" (1969)	Sid
Department S	"Dead Men Die Twice" (1969)	Alain
Comedy Playhouse	"The Jugg Brothers" (1970)	George Fryer
1917	Short Film (1970)	Pte. Whittaker
Randall and Hopkirk (Deceased)	"You Can Always Find a Fall Guy" (1970)	Patient
Callan	"Summoned to Appear" (1970)	Mr. Lorrimer
The Ten Commandments	"Black Eye on Sunday" (1971)	Lane
Under Capricorn	Unknown episode (1983)	Bank Secretary
Run, Chrissie, Run!	Film (1984)	Clough
Robbery Under Arms	Film (1985)	Shanty keeper
Playing Beatie Bow	Film (1986)	Legless
