= James Culliford =

British actor (1927–2002)

- in Gideon's Way (1965)
- Born: Albert James Culliford; 8 September 1927; West Ham, London, England
- Died: 23 March 2002 (aged 74); Brighton, Sussex, England
- Occupation: Actor
- Partner: Alfred Lynch

James Culliford (8 September 1927 – 23 March 2002) was a British actor on stage, film and television.

Culliford met his life partner, the actor Alfred Lynch, at theatre acting evening classes. Some of his noted roles are The Entertainer (1960), The Trygon Factor (1966), and Quatermass and the Pit (1967). He also appeared in the Doctor Who serial Frontier in Space in 1973.

After suffering a stroke in 1972, he and Lynch moved from London to Brighton. They lived together until Culliford's death in 2002. Lynch died of cancer the following year.

== Filmography ==
Year	Title	Role	Notes
1960	The Entertainer	Cobber Carson	
1963	West 11	Man on Train	Uncredited
1966	The Trygon Factor	Luke Embarday	
1967	The Champions	Charles	
1967	Quatermass and the Pit	Corporal Gibson	
1972	Death Line	Publican	

=== Television ===
Year	Title	Role	Notes	Ref.
1954	Sunday Night Theatre	Servant to Troilus	Episode: Troilus and Cressida	
1959	Crime Sheet		Episode: "Lockhart Visits a Pawn Shop"	
1959	The History of Mr. Polly	Garrard	One episode	
1959	The Men from Room 13	Shiner		
1959-66	No Hiding Place	Leo Quinn/Jimmy Smithers/Rocky Stone	Three episodes	
1960	Armchair Theatre	Albert Klein	Episode: "Some Talk of Alexander"	
1960	The True Mistery of the Passion	Thief	TV movie	
1960	Deadline Midnight	Tom Douglas	Nine episodes	
1960	ITV Television Playhouse	Dennis Fisher	Episode: Changing Values	
1961	The Brink	Brian Rapper	TV movie	
1961	The Bun House Wedding	Alec	TV movie	
1961	ITV Play of the Week	Lvov/Robert	Two episodes	
1961	The Jelly End Strike	Jacko	TV movie	
1961	Choirboys Unite!	Mr Stokel	TV movie	
1962	Corrigan Blake	Feliz	Episode: "You Can't Win Them All"	
1962-63	BBC Sunday-Night Play	Gimlet, driver/Grubber Entwistle	Two episodes	
1962-71	Z-Cars	Ralph Rhodes/Joe Smith/Arthur	Three episodes	
1964	Crane		Episode: "Epitah for a Fat Woman"	
1964	Love Story	Private Mason	Episode: "Beggars and Choosers"	
1965	Hit and Run	Det. Con. Wainwright	Three episodes	
1965	Gideon's Way	Eric Little	Episode: "The Alibi Man"	
1965	Front Page Story	Johnson	Episode: "Don't Shoot, I'm Press"	
1965	The Flying Swan	The Anybodies - Harry	Episode: "Group Mania"	
1965	Knock on Any Door	Haydon	Episode: "A Paragraph for Mr. Blake"	
1966	Redcap	Cpl. Westerby	Episode: "The Proper Charlie"	
1966	The Informer	Tony	Two episodes	
1967	Dixon of Dock Green	Crowthorne	Episode: "The Runs"	
1968	ITV Playhouse	Humphrey Saddler	Episode: Rogues' Gallery: The Misfortune of Lucy Hodges	
1968	The Champions	Sumner	Episode: "The Invisible Man"	
1968-73	Thirty-Minute Theatre	Gilbert/Bob	Two episodes	
1969	Market in Honey Lane	Alf Noble	Six episodes	
1970	Randall and Hopkirk (Deceased)	Parker	Episode: "The Ghost Talks"	
1971	ITV Sunday Night Theatre	Tony	Episode: Hari-Kari and Sally	
1971	Elizabeth R	John Savage	Episode: "Horrible Conspiracies"	
1971	Seasons of the Year	Syd	Episode: "Place to Go"	
1972	Pretenders	Sergeant	Episode: "The Paymaster"	
1972	Scene	The Detective	Episode: "Quiet Afternoon"	
1972	The Protectors	Ginter	Episode: "Thinkback"	
1973	Doctor Who	Stewart	Serial: "Frontier in Space"	
