= Jason King (TV series) =

British TV drama series (1971–1972)

- Genre: Crime thriller Action/adventure; Spy fiction
- Created by: Dennis Spooner; Monty Berman
- Starring: Peter Wyngarde
- Theme music composer: Laurie Johnson
- Composer: Laurie Johnson
- Country of origin: United Kingdom
- Original language: English
- No. of series: 1
- No. of episodes: 26

Production
- Producer: Monty Berman
- Running time: 50 mins
- Production company: ITC Entertainment

Original release
- Network: ITV (ATV)
- Release: 15 September 1971 – 28 April 1972

Related
- Department S

Jason King is a British television series starring Peter Wyngarde as the eponymous character. It was produced by ITC Entertainment and had a single season of 26 one-hour episodes that aired from 1971 to 1972. It was shown internationally as well, and has been released on DVD in the United Kingdom, the United States, Australia and Germany.

== Overview ==
The series featured the further adventures of the title character who had first appeared in Department S (1969). In that series he was a dilettante dandy and author of a series of adventure novels, working as part of a team of investigators. In Jason King he had left that service to concentrate on writing the adventures of Mark Caine, who closely resembled Jason King in looks, manner, style, and personality. None of the other regular characters from Department S appeared in this series, although Department S itself is occasionally referred to in dialogue.

In the course of visiting international locations as part of his research, or through being summoned by people needing assistance, King would be frequently embroiled in adventure stories featuring glamorous women, exotic locations, menacing villains, political turmoil, or espionage intrigue.

The first episode depicted King's retelling of a Mark Caine novel to a television executive, alternating between King's interpretation of events, and the television executive's version. King's version showed style and class, while the executive's version featured added suspense, more cliches, and had the women in more revealing costumes. In the footage representing both men's vision of the novel adapted for the screen, Mark Caine was portrayed by Wyngarde.

The titles of the Mark Caine books often consisted of four short words, in the manner of some of Ian Fleming's James Bond novels. The Mark Caine title mentioned most often in the series was Index Finger Left Hand; another was To China Yours Sincerely (parodying Fleming's From Russia With Love).

Subsequent episodes featured Wyngarde playing King trying to write his novels and being pressured by his publisher Nicola Harvester about deadlines. King, however, was usually distracted by women and the adventures of his normal life, and was sometimes tricked by Ryland of the British Government into assisting the Government in international political matters: all of which later found their way into the adventures of the fictional Mark Caine.

== Cast ==
- Peter Wyngarde as Jason King
- Anne Sharp as Nicola Harvester
- Ronald Lacey as Ryland
- Dennis Price as Sir Brian

== Production ==
The series was created by Dennis Spooner and like its predecessor was made by Lew Grade's ITC Entertainment production company (which had become successful with such series as The Saint and Danger Man). However, unlike previous ITC series which were shot on 35mm film, Jason King was filmed on 16mm to cut costs. Episodes were written specifically to include travel to various European locations to which Peter Wyngarde had, before the series, been brought for outdoor location filming; these shots were then included within the filmed narratives.

== Episodes ==
No.	Title	Directed by	Written by	Original release date
1	"Wanna Buy A Television Series?"	Roy Ward Baker	Dennis Spooner	15 September 1971
2	"A Page Before Dying"	Jeremy Summers	Tony Williamson	22 September 1971
3	"Buried in the Cold, Cold Ground"	Jeremy Summers	Philip Broadley	6 October 1971
4	"A Deadly Line in Digits"	Jeremy Summers	Tony Williamson	13 October 1971
5	"Variations on a Theme"	Cyril Frankel	Philip Broadley	20 October 1971
6	"As Easy as ABC"	Jeremy Summers	Tony Williamson	10 November 1971
Guest stars: Nigel Green, Michael Bates
7	"To Russia With .... Panache"	Paul Dickson	Tony Williamson	17 November 1971
8	"A Red, Red Rose Forever"	Cyril Frankel	Donald James	1 December 1971
9	"All That Glisters (Part One)"	Cyril Frankel	Philip Broadley	8 December 1971
10	"All That Glisters (Part Two)"	Cyril Frankel	Philip Broadley	15 December 1971
11	"Flamingoes Only Fly on Tuesdays"	Jeremy Summers	Tony Williamson	29 December 1971
12	"Toki"	Jeremy Summers	Tony Williamson	5 January 1972
Guest star: Felicity Kendal
13	"The Constance Missal"	Jeremy Summers	Harry W. Junkin	12 January 1972
14	"Uneasy Lies The Head"	Cyril Frankel	Donald James	19 January 1972
15	"Nadine"	Cyril Frankel	Philip Broadley	2 February 1972
Guest star: Ingrid Pitt
16	"A Kiss for a Beautiful Killer"	Cyril Frankel	Gerald Kelsey	9 February 1972
17	"If It's Got To Go, It's Got To Go"	Cyril Frankel	Dennis Spooner	16 February 1972
18	"Thin Band of Air"	Cyril Frankel	Harry W. Junkin	3 March 1972
19	"It's Too Bad About Auntie"	Jeremy Summers	Harry W. Junkin	10 March 1972
20	"The Stones of Venice"	Jeremy Summers	Donald James	17 March 1972
21	"A Royal Flush"	Roy Ward Baker	Philip Broadley	24 March 1972
22	"Every Picture Tells A Story"	Cyril Frankel	Robert Banks Stewart	31 March 1972
23	"Chapter One: The Company I Keep"	Cyril Frankel	Donald James	7 April 1972
24	"Zenia"	Roy Ward Baker	Philip Broadley	14 April 1972
25	"An Author in Search of Two Characters"	Cyril Frankel	Dennis Spooner	21 April 1972
26	"That Isn't Me, It's Somebody Else"	Roy Ward Baker	Dennis Spooner	28 April 1972

== Legacy ==
King's choice of fashion was named by Mike Myers as an inspiration for his popular movie character Austin Powers.

He is also one of the inspirations (especially his clothes) for Kim Newman's psychic crime fighter and secret agent Richard Jeperson.

== Parody ==
The Two Ronnies performed a sketch entitled 'Jason King', with Ronnie Corbett putting on all the airs and graces of King and Ronnie Barker playing a suspect in a murder investigation, during their third series in 1973.

Jason King was also the basis for Jason Bentley, played by Peter Richardson in the Comic Strip Presents episode Detectives on the Edge of a Nervous Breakdown (1993). Wyngarde said in a BBC television interview when this episode was originally transmitted that he was flattered by the affectionate parody, but insisted that Jason King would never wear crushed velvet.
