= Man in a Suitcase =

British TV thriller series (1967–1968)

- Genre: Private investigator Spy drama Crime thriller
- Created by: Dennis Spooner; Richard Harris
- Starring: Richard Bradford
- Opening theme: Ron Grainer
- Composers: Albert Elms; Freddie Phillips
- Country of origin: United Kingdom
- Original language: English
- No. of series: 1
- No. of episodes: 30 (list of episodes)

Production
- Producer: Sidney Cole
- Running time: 49 mins
- Production company: ITC Entertainment

Original release
- Network: ITV
- Release: 27 September 1967 – 17 April 1968

Man in a Suitcase is a British television private eye thriller series produced by Lew Grade's ITC Entertainment. It originally aired in the United Kingdom on ITV from 27 September 1967 to 17 April 1968. ABC broadcast episodes of Man in a Suitcase in the United States from 3 May to 20 September 1968.

== Origins and overview ==
Man in a Suitcase was effectively a replacement for Danger Man, whose production had been curtailed when its star Patrick McGoohan had decided to create his own series, The Prisoner. Many of the Danger Man production crew moved over to Man in a Suitcase, which was initially to be titled McGill after its lead character. As with several ITC productions, the series was to use an American star in an attempt to boost the show's sales in the USA. An early choice was Jack Lord, but the part of McGill eventually went to Richard Bradford, a method actor who was spotted after appearing opposite Marlon Brando in the 1966 movie The Chase. The series was created by Richard Harris and Dennis Spooner. Neither writer had any further involvement with the series—Spooner was mostly involved with producing his own series, The Champions—and the lead character changed somewhat from their original conception of a hard-boiled, wise-cracking detective.

McGill was a former intelligence agent, who had been forced to resign from the service six years before the opening episode, having been practically accused of treason. Unable to clear his name or return to the USA, McGill makes ends meet by working as a travelling private detective and bounty hunter based in Britain, living out of his suitcase (hence the title). His cases generally took him to different parts of Europe, and on a couple of occasions to Africa.

The theme tune was composed by Ron Grainer and it was later reused as the theme for Chris Evans' entertainment show TFI Friday. The incidental music was supplied by Albert Elms.

== Story and style ==
In the pilot episode, "Man from the Dead", the reason for McGill's disgrace is revealed. During an assignment six years earlier, he discovered that a top western scientist called LeFarbe was preparing to defect to the USSR. Though he planned to intercept the defector, he was ordered to stand down by his superior Harry Thyssen. Shortly afterwards, LeFarbe went over to the Soviets. Accused of complicity in the defection, McGill was unable to call on Thyssen to clear his name, as his superior had been drowned in a sailing accident, and he was forced to resign from the service amid much negative publicity. Six years on, McGill discovers that Thyssen is still alive, his death having been faked. He is now working as a sailor on a Russian freighter, in which capacity he acts as a courier of secret information from LeFarbe. The scientist is in fact a double agent, now highly placed in the Soviet scientific community to provide valuable intelligence. As McGill's diligence nearly blew open this important operation, his superiors had no choice but to make him a very public scapegoat, to maintain the illusion of the LeFarbe defection as genuine. On the series' first broadcast on ATV Midlands (Note: Before 1968 ATV transmitted weekdays in the Midlands and weekends in London. See History of ITV.) "Man from the Dead" was screened as the sixth episode; "Brainwash", thought to be a stronger tale, was in fact broadcast first.

Building on this foundation, Man in a Suitcase is a series very much about betrayal, mistrust and deceit. Because of his unofficial, semi-legal status, McGill often finds himself being hired by unscrupulous clients and unwittingly used for criminal ends, or set up as a fall guy. On several occasions, characters from his past with US intelligence draw him into dangerous situations; and he can also be blackmailed or tricked into participating in espionage missions, as he is the perfect deniable operative. A number of the series writers were new to ITC, and this resulted in a show that was markedly different from the usual light-hearted adventure and espionage fantasy of such series. It highlighted character-based drama grounded in a cynical view of the real world, making it more akin to the spy novels of John le Carré and Len Deighton.

As developed by Bradford, the characterisation of McGill is complex. As a man who feels betrayed by life and his country, he can appear outwardly as surly, moody and uncommunicative, but this masks a sensitive interior. McGill feels compassion for those who were the victims in his cases, and would try to help them, often at his own cost.

The level of violence portrayed in the show was unprecedented for an ITC series. This was partly because of Bradford's concerns that the stories and characters should remain real. Unlike most TV action heroes of the time, McGill would not get cleanly knocked unconscious and then recover without effect; Bradford took great pains to depict the character as wounded and concussed. In addition to beatings, McGill is several times shot and stabbed, and ends more than one episode recovering in hospital.

One gimmick of the show is that McGill's first name is never revealed. Some close friends instead know him as "Mac". Note, though, in the episode 'Who's Mad Now?', McGill goes to pick up his mail, and one of the letters is clearly addressed to "R. McGill Esq."

As with the other ITC series of the era, although the plots took McGill far and wide around the world, in reality the majority of filming was done in and around Pinewood Studios. The series was unusual in its use of night-time filming (as opposed to the day-for-night approach common at the time). Actual locations included London's South Bank and White City Stadium in "Man from the Dead", Albert Bridge, London in "The Bridge" and Kingston upon Thames in "Day of Execution", the latter a setting for a remarkable (for its time) night-time car chase.

== Cast ==
Richard Bradford is the only regular actor in the series. Guest stars include some ITC regulars such as Roger Delgado, Stuart Damon, Jane Merrow, Basil Dignam, Ed Bishop, Anton Rodgers, George Sewell, Philip Madoc, and John Gregson; and such actors as Barbara Shelley, Rodney Bewes, Felicity Kendal, Rupert Davies, Colin Blakely, Ray McAnally, Bernard Lee, Jacqueline Pearce, Edward Fox, Sam Kydd, Donald Sutherland, Rosemary Nicols

== Episode list ==
Airdate and episode order is for ATV Midlands; other ITV regions varied date and order.

No.	Title	Directed by	Written by	Original release date	Prod. code
1	"Brainwash"	Charles Crichton	Francis Megahy and Bernie Cooper	27 September 1967	106
2	"The Sitting Pigeon"	Gerry O'Hara	Edmund Ward	4 October 1967	115
3	"Day of Execution"	Charles Crichton	Phillip Broadley	11 October 1967	110
4	"Variation on a Million Bucks" – Part one	Pat Jackson	Stanley R. Greenberg	18 October 1967	108
5	"Variation on a Million Bucks" – Part two	Robert Tronson	Stanley R. Greenberg	25 October 1967	109
6	"Man from the Dead"	Pat Jackson	Stanley R. Greenberg	1 November 1967	101
7	"Sweet Sue"	Robert Tronson	Phillip Broadley	8 November 1967	103
8	"Essay in Evil"	Freddie Francis	Kevin B. Laffan	15 November 1967	120
9	"The Girl Who Never Was"	Robert Tronson	Donald Jonson	22 November 1967	107
10	"All That Glitters"	Herbert Wise	Stanley R. Greenberg	29 November 1967	102
11	"Dead Man's Shoes"	Peter Duffell	Edmund Ward	6 December 1967	118
12	"Find the Lady"	Robert Tronson	Phillip Broadley	13 December 1967	105
13	"The Bridge"	Pat Jackson	Robert Muller	20 December 1967	104
14	"The Man Who Stood Still"	Peter Duffell	Raymond Bowers	27 December 1967	116
15	"Burden of Proof"	Peter Duffell	Edmund Ward	3 January 1968	122
16	"The Whisper"	Charles Crichton	Morris Farhi	10 January 1968	119
17	"Why They Killed Nolan"	Charles Crichton	Donald Jonson	17 January 1968	121
18	"The Boston Square"	Don Chaffey	Wilfred Greatorex	24 January 1968	113
19	"Somebody Loses, Somebody...Wins?"	John Glen	Jan Read	31 January 1968	117
20	"Blind Spot"	Jeremy Summers	Victor Canning	7 February 1968	112
21	"No Friend of Mine"	Charles Crichton	John Stanton	14 February 1968	125
22	"Jigsaw Man"	Charles Frend	Stanley R. Greenberg and Reed De Rouen	21 February 1968	114
23	"Web with Four Spiders"	Robert Tronson	Edmund Ward	28 February 1968	111
24	"Which Way Did He Go, McGill?"	Freddie Francis	Francis Megahy and Bernie Cooper	6 March 1968	126
25	"Property of a Gentleman"	Peter Duffell	Wilfred Greatorex	13 March 1968	124
26	"The Revolutionaries"	Peter Duffell	Jan Read; Story by Kevin B. Laffan	20 March 1968	127
27	"Who's Mad Now?"	Freddie Francis	Roger Parkes	27 March 1968	123
28	"Three Blinks of the Eyes"	Charles Crichton	Vincent Tilsley	3 April 1968	128
29	"Castle in the Clouds"	Peter Duffell	Jan Read	10 April 1968	129
30	"Night Flight to Andorra"	Freddie Francis	Jan Read and Reed De Rouen	17 April 1968	130

The two-part story "Variation on a Million Bucks" was edited into a feature film for theatrical release in Europe, entitled To Chase a Million.

== DVD and Blu-ray ==
The entire series has been released on DVD in Britain in a boxed set by Network. There are eight discs (Region 2 UK). Extras consist of commercial bumpers, both US and UK, a music-only track on one or two episodes, and an interview with series star Richard Bradford where he sometimes vehemently describes the working conditions and former producers of the show.

Prior to this, Carlton Video had released a single disc with the first two episodes.

The series is also available in Australia from Umbrella Entertainment in a boxed set.

Acorn Media released two four-disc, Region 1 boxed sets in 2010.

In October 2017 Network DVD announced that the series was to be issued on Blu-ray.

== Other media ==
Writer Rodney Marshall and television historian Matthew Lee produced the first critical guide to the series in 2015.
