= Hilary Tindall =

English actress (1938–1992)

- Born: 14 August 1938; Manchester, England
- Died: 5 December 1992 (aged 54); Selborne, Hampshire, England
- Occupation: Actress
- Spouse: Robin Lowe (m. 1963)
- Children: 2
- Relatives: John Loder (father-in-law)

Hilary Tindall (14 August 1938 - 5 December 1992) was an English stage and television actress. She is best remembered for the role of Ann Hammond, the troubled wife of Brian Hammond (Richard Easton), in the BBC television series The Brothers.

Tindall trained at the Royal Academy of Dramatic Art and during her career appeared in such television programmes as The Champions, The Baron, Randall and Hopkirk (Deceased), Emergency - Ward 10, The Brothers, The Fall and Rise of Reginald Perrin, The Cuckoo Waltz, Z-Cars, Max Headroom: 20 Minutes into the Future, Tales of the Unexpected and A Kind of Loving. She also acted in Terence Donovan's rarely seen action film Yellow Dog in 1973.

She starred in Derek Nimmo's Far East tour of The Man Most Likely To with Leslie Phillips and a young Elizabeth Hurley.

== Personal life ==
Hilary Tindall died of bowel cancer aged 54, at her home in Selborne, Hampshire, in 1992. She was survived by her husband, Robin Lowe, (the eldest son of actor John Loder) and her two children, Kate Slesinger (née Lowe) and Julian Lowe.
