= Tony Williamson =

British television writer (1932–1991)

- Born: 18 December 1932; Manchester, England; United Kingdom
- Died: 19 June 1991 (aged 58)
- Occupation: Television screenwriter

Tony Williamson (18 December 1932 in Manchester – 19 June 1991) was a prolific British television writer, most active from the mid-1960s to the mid-1980s. He wrote primarily for the action-adventure and espionage genres. Perhaps because of his early involvement in The Avengers, he often found work on shows that featured fantasy adventure, rather than the kitchen sink realism that had arisen in Britain at the start of his career. Series with extraordinary lead characters in unusual circumstances, such as Department S, Jason King, Randall and Hopkirk (Deceased) and The Adventurer, dominated his output.

He has been credited with creating the short-lived dramas Intrigue and Counterstrike, as well as being a key player in the development of Adam Adamant Lives!

== Career ==
Williamson's writing career has its roots in his obligatory national service as a young man. Whilst in the Royal Air Force, he began a lifelong association with fellow airman Dennis Spooner by writing some amateur efforts. After the war, he accepted a position as a news correspondent for CBS in Canada. On the side, he wrote at least twenty stage plays that were later produced on various anthological television programmes.

When he returned to Britain, he flirted with soap operas such as Coronation Street and Compact. However, by the mid-1960s he embarked upon his career of writing spy fiction with the sale of a script to The Mask of Janus. Though he also contributed to its spin-off, The Spies, Williamson swiftly moved on to a more fantastic espionage setting with his first sale to The Avengers in 1965. He wrote a few more scripts for the Emma Peel era before being hired by Sydney Newman to script-edit Adam Adamant Lives! When Newman cancelled that show, he returned to The Avengers, for which he was a dominant writer of the show's Peel-less final season.

Following the demise of The Avengers, he worked on a number of programmes on which Dennis Spooner held some measure of creative control as a creator or story editor, for ITC Entertainment. Projects such as Randall and Hopkirk (Deceased), The Champions, and Department S all came to accept his script submissions following Adamant. His initial sale to Department S was particularly significant in that it began a series of sales involving the character of Jason King, the lead in two programmes in the early 1970s. His final script using the spy, Jason King's "A Page Before Dying", would mark the end of Williamson's longest association with a single fictional character.

Aside from his work in television, Williamson wrote several Fontana published thrillers in the 1970s under his own name and at least one ('Slade's Marauder' Souvenir Press, 1980) under the pseudonym Steven Cade. At the same time he wrote for the big screen. Night Watch (1973) featured a Williamson screenplay and a cast including Elizabeth Taylor, Billie Whitelaw and Laurence Harvey. The less well-reviewed Breakthrough (1979), co-written with Peter Bernies, starred Richard Burton and Rod Steiger. The film was heavily indebted to Sam Peckinpah's classic Cross of Iron.

After heart surgery in 1980, Williamson deliberately slowed his output. However, he was the dominant contributor to the 1986 supernatural series Worlds Beyond.

Williamson died during a second heart procedure in 1991, soon after his third film, a minor Roger Moore vehicle called Fire, Ice and Dynamite, opened in West Germany.
