= Donald James =

British writer (1931–2008)

- Born: Donald James Wheal; 22 August 1931; World's End, London, UK
- Died: 28 April 2008 (aged 76); London, UK
- Education: Pembroke College, Cambridge
- Occupations: Screenwriter, novelist, non‑fiction writer
- Children: Twin daughters
- Writing career
- Pen name: Thomas Dresden; James Barwick; James Taylor
- Years active: 1964–2007
- Notable work: Inspector Vadim novels

Donald James (born Donald James Wheal; 22 August 1931 – 28 April 2008) was a British screenwriter, novelist and non-fiction writer.

== Early life ==
James was born in World's End, Chelsea, a working-class enclave of an otherwise prosperous area. His father held various jobs, working as a porter in a block of flats, as a clerk at a dog track and, eventually, as an illegal bookmaker. In 1944, the Wheal home was destroyed during a German bombing raid and the family moved to White City. In 1946 James visited post-war France, an experience which would influence his writing.

Educated at Sloane Grammar School and Pembroke College, Cambridge, where he read history, James completed his national service in the Parachute Regiment before returning to London to become a supply teacher. He also briefly worked in public relations and at the Daily Telegraph library. In the early 1960s, James was a television actor.

== Writing career ==
In 1964 he began a career as a screenwriter, mostly in TV, making his debut with crime drama No Hiding Place. His writing also included the TV series The Adventurer, The Avengers, The Champions, Department S, Joe 90, Mission: Impossible, The Persuaders!, The Protectors, Randall and Hopkirk (Deceased), The Saint, The Secret Service, Space: 1999, Terrahawks and UFO. From the 1960s to the 1980s, he penned over 250 TV scripts. He wrote for a total of 22 TV productions and films, including the Century 21 film Doppelgänger.

In the 1970s James became a thriller novelist, publishing his first title, A Spy at Evening, in 1977. His later works included The Fall of the Russian Empire (1982), Monstrum (1997), The Fortune Teller (1999), and Vadim (2000). He also wrote non-fiction, co-authoring The Penguin Dictionary of the Third Reich (1997) under pseudonym James Taylor. Other pen names included Thomas Dresden and James Barwick (originally in collaboration with Tony Barwick, a fellow writer on the TV productions of Gerry and Sylvia Anderson and their company AP Films/Century 21).

His autobiographical account of London life during World War II, World's End, was published in 2005. A second volume of memoirs, White City, followed in March 2007.

James died in London on 28 April 2008. Married three times and divorced once, he was survived by twin daughters from his first marriage.
