= The Share Out =

1962 British film by Gerard Glaister

- Theatrical release poster
- Directed by: Gerard Glaister
- Screenplay by: Philip Mackie
- Based on: Jack O'Judgment by Edgar Wallace
- Produced by: Jack Greenwood
- Starring: Bernard Lee Alexander Knox Moira Redmond
- Cinematography: Bert Mason
- Edited by: Bernard Gribble
- Production company: Merton Park Studios
- Distributed by: Anglo-Amalgamated
- Release date: 1962
- Running time: 62 minutes
- Country: United Kingdom
- Language: English

The Share Out (also known as The Shareout) is a 1962 British second feature film directed by Gerard Glaister and starring Bernard Lee, Alexander Knox and Moira Redmond. Part of the long-running series of Edgar Wallace Mysteries films made at Merton Park Studios, it is based on the 1920 Wallace novel Jack O'Judgment.

== Plot ==
Colonel Calderwood runs a property company as a front for blackmail. Intending to shortly wind down the company, Calderwood has converted its funds into diamonds, which will be shared equally between himself and his partners John Crewe and Monet, and company secretary Diana Marsh, none of whom trust each other or Calderwood.

Detective Superintendent Meredith of Scotland Yard is suspicious of the company's activities, but is unable to persuade any of its blackmail victims to help the police. Meredith enlists private investigator Mike Stafford to infiltrate the company. Calderwood immediately tasks Stafford with spying on Diana Marsh.

Monet is murdered. Calderwood murders Crewe. Stafford shoots Calderwood.

Diana and Stafford have fallen in love, and as they are about to flee the country, Meredith arrests them for plotting the murders.

== Cast ==
- Bernard Lee as Detective Superintendent Meredith
- Alexander Knox as Colonel Calderwood
- Moira Redmond as Diana Marsh
- William Russell as Mike Stafford
- Richard Vernon as John Crewe
- Richard Warner as Mark Speller
- John Gabriel as Monet
- Jack Rodney as Gregory
- Stanley Morgan as Detective Saregeant Anson
- Robert Perceval as Britton
- Ann Harriman as receptionist
- Julie Shearing as Judy
- Fanny Carby as Mrs. Wall
- Ian Hamilton as waiter
- Walter Horsbrugh as registrar

== Critical reception ==
The Monthly Film Bulletin wrote: "Unlike other films in this series, this case of dishonour among thieves catches something of the true Edgar Wallace flavour. The plot's intricacies are carried with a flourish and the characters' ingenious capacity for double-crossing is enjoyably portrayed by a strong cast. As the persistent cop, Bernard Lee is so good he almost upsets the balance of this essentially modest entertainment."
