= Circus of Fear =

1966 film by Werner Jacobs, John Llewellyn Moxey

- DVD cover
- Directed by: John Llewellyn Moxey
- Written by: Harry Alan Towers (as "Peter Welbeck")
- Based on: Again the Three Just Men by Edgar Wallace
- Produced by: Harry Alan Towers
- Starring: Christopher Lee; Leo Genn; Anthony Newlands; Heinz Drache; Eddi Arent; Klaus Kinski; Margaret Lee; Suzy Kendall; Cecil Parker; Victor Maddern; Maurice Kaufmann
- Cinematography: Ernest Steward
- Edited by: John Trumper
- Music by: Johnny Douglas
- Production companies: Circus Films; Proudweeks
- Distributed by: Warner-Pathé Distributors (UK); Constantin Film (W. Germany); American International Pictures (US)
- Release dates: 29 April 1966 (W. Germany); November 1967 (UK)
- Running time: 90 minutes
- Countries: United Kingdom; West Germany
- Language: English

Circus of Fear (German: Das Rätsel des silbernen Dreieck / Mystery of the Silver Triangle); also Scotland Yard auf heißer Spur, also Circus of Terror; U.S. title Psycho-Circus) is a 1966 Anglo-German international co-production thriller film directed by John Llewellyn Moxey and starring Christopher Lee, Suzy Kendall, Leo Genn and Cecil Parker. Werner Jacobs directed the version released in West Germany. It was written by Harry Alan Towers based on the 1928 novel Again the Three Just Men by Edgar Wallace.

== Plot ==
The film is set in London and the countryside, mainly in the East End and docklands. When an armoured car is robbed, in a daring daylight raid co-ordinated on Tower Bridge, one of the guards is shot and killed by Mason. The gang escape on the river. Part of the gang escape northwards on the M1 motorway. The police catch up and force them off the road, killing one man. Meanwhile Mason dumps his car in a lake and takes a suitcase full of money to nearby buildings. An unseen knife-thrower kills Mason as he turns to leave.

We are introduced to the characters of Barberini's Circus, including Drago, who wears a full mask to hide his fire damaged face. Manfred arrives at the circus seeking employment. It is revealed that Mr Big (the midget) is blackmailing Drago. An unseen person unlocks the lion and it almost kills one of the circus girls. The police are led to the circus but also require to investigate a body found with a knife next to it. The police interview the girl who was attacked by the lion and soon after is herself murdered by a thrown knife. The police interview the circus knife-thrower. Drago confesses to his niece that he found a suitcase of money and hid it. Manfred is the next victim of the knife-thrower who this time also sets a fire.

A police manhunt causes Drago to fall to his death and the suitcase of money is retrieved. However, detective Elliot (Leo Genn) decides this is not the killer. His examination of all the clues leads to a final denouement in front of the assembled suspects during a knife-throwing act.

== Cast ==
- Christopher Lee as Gregor
- Leo Genn as Elliott
- Anthony Newlands as Barberini
- Heinz Drache as Carl
- Eddi Arent as Eddie
- Klaus Kinski as Manfred Hart
- Margaret Lee as Gina
- Suzy Kendall as Natasha
- Cecil Parker as Sir John
- Victor Maddern as Mason
- Maurice Kaufmann as Mario
- Lawrence James as Manley
- Tom Bowman as Jackson
- Skip Martin as Mr. Big
- Nosher Powell as Red
- Gordon Petrie as man
- Henry B. Longhurst as hotel porter
- Dennis Blakely as Armoured van guard
- George Fisher as fourth man
- Peter Brace as speedboat man
- Roy Scammell as speedboat man
- Geoff Silk as security man
- Keith Peacock as security man
- John Carradine as narrator

== Production ==
Finance came in part from Anglo-Amalgamated. It was shot at Hammer Film's Bray Studios in Berkshire and on location around London.The film was partially shot at Billy Smart's Circus. Filming took place from 6 December 1965 to 15 January 1966 during which time it was known as Man Without a Face.

The film was co-produced by the leading German distributor Constantin Film, which was at the same time releasing Rialto Film's long-running series of Wallace adaptations in Germany. Heinz Drache, Eddi Arent and Klaus Kinski were regular performers in that series and were added to this production to appeal to German audiences.

After the film was released Lee wrote a friend:

I have not dared to go and see this film either in public or in private and I prefer to forget that I was ever involved in it. All I can say is that we did not have a bad story at the time that we made the film, but due to completely chaotic production, disinterested direction and a totally inadequate cast seemingly made up of about 110 nationalities, we found ourselves landed with an imperial egg. It is the same old sad story... lack of preparation and lack of an authoritative hand at the helm.

== Release ==
The film premiered in Germany on 29 April 1966 and in the UK in November 1967.

The film was bought for AIP who cut the running time to under an hour and released it in the US as Psycho Circus. The film was also simultaneously released on television in the full length version.

== Reception ==
Lee reported that despite his own misgivings about the film "it received more than adequate notices in the trade press (I gave a most 'sympathetic performance') and that the public is going to see it in large numbers. God knows why."

The Monthly Film Bulletin wrote: "A stolid thriller incorporating every cliché known to circus settings. Acting, script and direction are all equally flaccid."

The Radio Times wrote, "Christopher Lee wears a black woolly hood for nearly all of his scenes in this lame whodunnit, with minor horrific overtones...but the stalwart efforts of the cast including Klaus Kinski and Suzy Kendall act as a welcome safety net for the shaky plot"; while Britmovie called it "fairly suspenseful."

== See also ==
- Christopher Lee filmography
