= Double Dan =

Double Dan may refer to:

- Double Dan (novel), a 1924 novel by Edgar Wallace
- Double Dan (play), a 1927 stage adaptation of Wallace's novel
