= The Green Ribbon =

The Green Ribbon may refer to:

- Green ribbon
- "The Green Ribbon" (story), by Alvin Schwartz
- The Green Ribbon (novel), a 1929 novel by Edgar Wallace

== See also ==
- Green Ribbon Club
