= James Eastwood =

James, Jim or Jimmy Eastwood may refer to:

- James Eastwood (author) see The Fourth Square
- Jimmy Eastwood (footballer) (1915-1995) English footballer, see List of Rochdale A.F.C. players (25–99 appearances)
