= Man at the Carlton Tower =

1961 British film by Robert Tronson

- Directed by: Robert Tronson
- Written by: Philip Mackie
- Based on: The Man at the Carlton by Edgar Wallace
- Produced by: Jack Greenwood; Jim O'Connolly
- Starring: Maxine Audley; Lee Montague; Allan Cuthbertson
- Cinematography: Bert Mason
- Edited by: Bernard Gribble
- Music by: Ron Goodwin
- Production company: Merton Park Studios
- Distributed by: Anglo-Amalgamated
- Release date: July 1961
- Running time: 57 minutes
- Country: United Kingdom
- Language: English

Man at the Carlton Tower is a 1961 British second feature ('B') crime film directed by Robert Tronson and starring Maxine Audley, Lee Montague and Allan Cuthbertson. The screenplay was by Philip Mackie, based on the 1931 Edgar Wallace novel The Man at the Carlton. It is part of the series of Edgar Wallace Mysteries films made at Merton Park Studios from 1960 to 1965.

== Plot ==
Tim Jordan is an ex-policeman helping the police look for Rhodesian criminal Lew Daney, who has murdered a policeman.

== Cast ==
- Maxine Audley as Lydia Daney
- Lee Montague as Tim Jordan
- Allan Cuthbertson as Det. Supt. Cowley
- Terence Alexander as Johnny Time
- Alfred Burke as Harry Stone
- Nigel Green as Lew Daney
- Nyree Dawn Porter as Mary Greer
- Geoffrey Frederick as Det. Sgt. Pepper
- Geoffrey Lumsden as Stocker
- Frank Forsyth as commissionaire
- Steven Scott as Gallo
- Keith Ashley as junior clerk
- Howard Taylor as reception clerk
- Nancy Roberts as barmaid
- Adrian Oker as waiter

== Critical reception ==
Monthly Film Bulletin said "The latest of the Edgar Wallace mystery series, an amalgam of deductive duologues, gunplay and publicity for the new Carlton Tower Hotel, has about it the air of a television series manqué, competent enough of its undistinguished kind. Alfred Burke gives a novel style of smooth menace to his villain, but the ending where he loses both loot and life is confused and unconvincing."

Kine Weekly wrote: "A competent team and resourceful director cleverly handle the skilfully carpentered plot against plush backgrounds and the upshot is taut and exciting popular crime fare. ... The picture, which not only pivots on, but is a lush brochure for, the Carlton Tower Hotel, has a stronger feminine interest than most Edgar Wallace plays. Its stressing at the distaff side does not, however, unduly cushion thrills. Maxine Audley disarms as Lydia, Lee Montague and Allan Cuthbertson convince as Tim and a 'Yard chief, and Alfred Burke and Nigel Green are well cast as crooks Stone and Daney. It has neat light relief, and the surprise denouement is expertly sprung."
