= Der Frosch mit der Maske =

1959 film

- German Filmprogrammheft for the film
- Directed by: Harald Reinl
- Written by: Egon Eis; J. Joachim Bartsch
- Based on: The Fellowship of the Frog by Edgar Wallace
- Produced by: Preben Philipsen
- Starring: Siegfried Lowitz; Joachim Fuchsberger
- Cinematography: Ernst W. Kalinke
- Edited by: Margot Jahn
- Music by: Willy Mattes; Karl Bette (songs)
- Production company: Rialto Film
- Distributed by: Constantin Film
- Release date: 1959
- Running time: 90 minutes
- Countries: West Germany; Denmark
- Languages: German; Danish
- Budget: under 600,000 Deutsche Mark

Der Frosch mit der Maske (translation: The Frog with the Mask), aka Face of the Frog, is a 1959 West German-Danish black-and-white crime film directed by Harald Reinl and starring Siegfried Lowitz and Joachim Fuchsberger. It was the first of a very successful series of films based on works by Edgar Wallace produced by Rialto Film in West Germany. This film was adapted from the 1925 novel The Fellowship of the Frog.

== Plot ==
In London, a gang of criminals led by a mysterious masked figure known as "Frog with the Mask”, has been terrorizing the city with a string of robberies for years. Neither Inspector Elk nor his assistant Sergeant Balder have managed to put a stop to the gang or uncover the Frog's identity. After a jewel robbery, which results in a brutal murder of an undercover detective attempting to infiltrate the gang, Richard Gordon, the nephew of Scotland Yard boss Sir Archibald, becomes drawn to the case.

Following a potential lead, Richard and his butler James encounter the enigmatic John Bennet, who lives with his son Ray and daughter Ella in an idyllic house in Landsmoore. Gordon soon discovers the Bennets have become involved with the frog gang, as the Frog has eyes on Ella. Despite all the warnings of his colleague Philo Johnson, Ray quits his job at the renowned newspaper publisher Maitland, and shortly afterwards finds work in the Lolita bar. This dance and revue bar becomes more and more the focus of Inspector Elk's investigation when the suspicion becomes clear that it is a hideout for members of the frog gang.

As the investigation continues, Inspector Elk is able to unmask Sergeant Balder as a member of the frog gang and arrests him. Ray is mistakenly suspected of having shot Lew Brady, who was also part of the frog gang, in the Lolita Bar and is sentenced to hang. With the help of a film camera that Gordon secretly installed in the bar, Ray's innocence can be proven and he can be saved from the executioner John Bennet at the last moment. In the end it is revealed that the burglar who was believed to be dead is Harry Lime alias Philo Johnson "the Frog".

== Cast ==
- Siegfried Lowitz as Inspector William Elk
- Joachim Fuchsberger as Richard Gordon
- Jochen Brockmann as Philo Johnson
- Carl Lange as John Bennet
- Elfie von Kalckreuth as Ella Bennet (credited as Eva Anthes)
- Walter Wilz as Ray Bennet
- Dieter Eppler as Josua Broad
- Erwin Strahl as Sergeant Balder / Number 7
- Eva Pflug as Lolita
- Fritz Rasp as Ezra Maitland
- Eddi Arent as James, the butler
- Ernst Fritz Fürbringer as Sir Archibald

== Production ==
The film is adapted from Edgar Wallace's novel The Fellowship of the Frog (1925). Previous versions were made in 1928 in the US (as a serial) and in 1937 in the UK, both titled The Mark of the Frog.

The project was deemed risky, as so far no German crime film had really succeeded at the box office after World War II. The initiative to try came from Waldfried Barthel, head of Constantin Film who approached his friend Preben Philipsen with the idea. Philipsen acquired the rights for the movie adaption of The Fellowship of the Frog and The Crimson Circle from Penelope Wallace, with an option on other novels by her father should the films be successful. Barthel decided on Reinl as director and fixed production cost at a maximum of 600,000 Deutsche Mark. As scriptwriter the producer hired Egon Eis who had worked on the 1931 adaption of The Squeaker. Eis' script for the Frog, delivered in January 1959 under the pen name "Trygve Larsen", stuck closely to the novel. Jochen Joachim Bartsch, a friend of Reinl, also worked on the script. The "comic relief" character, played by Arent, was added by the script writers, he does not exist in the novel. Some characters were much reduced in significance (Broad and Maitland), some were dropped altogether (Maitland's sister). Another change was making Fuchsberger's character the nephew of Sir Archibald, the head of Scotland Yard. In addition, the name for Brockmann's character was changed: in Wallace's novel he was called "Harry Lime" (or Lyme). Since this had been the name of Orson Welles' character in Carol Reed's The Third Man (1949), the producers decided to change it, to Philo Johnson.

Cinematography took place from 24 April to 9 June 1959. The studio for interiors was Palladium Atelier at Copenhagen. Exteriors were also shot in and around Kopenhagen. A small team, including Reinl and his director of cinematography Kalinke travelled to London for two days to shoot some stock footage to be used in back projection.

== Release ==
The FSK gave the film a rating of 16 years and up, unsuitable for screening on public holidays. Four scenes had to be cut to receive even this rating and avoid an "adults only" one.

The film premiered on 4 September 1959 at the Universum in Stuttgart. With an audience of 3 million in West Germany the film was an extraordinary success.

The film's box office success ultimately spawned the Edgar Wallace series of films by Rialto of 32 films that ran through 1972. The series heavily influenced the style and content of West German crime and mystery films throughout the 1960s, as well as giving rise to outright copycat films made by other studios such as Artur Brauner's CCC Film.

== Home media ==
The film made its DVD debut on 29 January 2008 by Infinity Entertainment Group as a part of The Edgar Wallace Collection which included several other adaptions of the works of writer Edgar Wallace.

== In popular culture ==
In 2004, the German spoof film Der Wixxer was released, which heavily parodies the 1950s and 1960s German Edgar Wallace films. It contains many references to the classic Edgar Wallace films, and in one scene, the Frog with the Mask is also referenced: At a conference of super villains, he appears as a man in a frog costume, who is also an obvious parody of Kermit the Frog, since he talks with a Kermit-style high-pitched voice (provided by Andreas von der Meden, who also provided the German voice for Kermit) and in one scene also ironically says "Applause, applause, applause!" - a common catch phrase of Kermit in the German dub of The Muppet Show.
