= Clue of the Twisted Candle =

1960 British film by Allan Davis

- Directed by: Allan Davis
- Written by: Philip Mackie
- Based on: The Clue of the Twisted Candle by Edgar Wallace
- Produced by: Jack Greenwood; Jim O'Connolly
- Starring: Bernard Lee; David Knight; Francis de Wolff
- Cinematography: Brian Rhodes
- Edited by: Bernard Gribble
- Music by: Francis Chagrin
- Production company: Merton Park Studios
- Distributed by: Anglo-Amalgamated
- Release date: September 1960
- Running time: 61 minutes
- Country: United Kingdom
- Language: English

Clue of the Twisted Candle is a 1960 British second feature crime film directed by Allan Davis and starring Bernard Lee, David Knight and Francis de Wolff. The screenplay was by Philip Mackie, based on the 1918 Edgar Wallace novel The Clue of the Twisted Candle. It is part of the series of Edgar Wallace Mysteries films made at Merton Park Studios from 1960 to 1965.

== Plot ==
Lexman is sent to prison, having been tricked by the Greek blackmailer Karadis. He escapes, and Karadis is found murdered in a sealed room. Meredith proves that it was Lexman who killed Karadis, who was in fact his partner in the blackmail operation.

== Cast ==
- Bernard Lee as Superintendent Meredith
- David Knight as Lexman
- Francis de Wolff as Ramon Karadis
- Colette Wilde as Grace
- Christine Shaw as Linda Buckland
- Stanley Morgan as Sergeant Anson
- A. J. Brown as Commissioner of Police
- Richard Caldicot as Fisher
- Edmond Bennett as manservant
- Simon Lack as Jock
- Anthony Baird as Sergeant Butterfield
- Gladys Henson as landlady
- Alfred Maron as Finch
- Richard Vernon as Viney
- Harry Locke as Amis
- Roy Purcell as Brennan
- Kenneth Fortescue as Secretary, C.I.D.
- Hazel Hughes as Miss Cunningham

== Critical reception ==
The Monthly Film Bulletin wrote: "The first of a series of one-hour second features adapted from Edgar Wallace, brought up to date but unable to avoid the slightly old-fashioned look one associates with Wallace's theatricality and liking for red herrings, Clue of the Twisted Candle nevertheless augurs well for the stories to come. After a slow start, curiosity is aroused and resourcefully maintained, with solid backgrounds, crisp playing and economical treatment lending the film an expert air."

Variety wrote: "Compared to other Wallace films, this is tame stuff. Disregard the usual mild production values, pat camera setups and choppy editing. However, the usual bizarre characterizations are not present, Bernard Lee is engagingly enthusiastic as the persistent Yard man, and David Knight is occasionally effective in his dual role; but the balance of the cast is lacklustre, without sufficient motivation or eccentricities. Then too, there is little of the gruesome, fast paced action which usually inhabits Wallace pictures. Too much of the story occurs offscreen, especially the key murder sequences. Scripter Mackie and director Davis were just not inventive enough to make this programmer the satisfactory interlude it potentially might have been. Except for Lee's dynamic chomping away to track down the villain, the story lags along too predictably, with no real puzzle for mystery fans seeking a diverting whodunit."

Picture Show wrote: "really gripping entertainment ...a plot packed with red herrings, all kinds of twists, melodrama and romance. And it’s only an hour long. There just isn't time to be bored."
