= Never Back Losers =

1961 British film by Robert Tronson

- Directed by: Robert Tronson
- Written by: Lukas Heller
- Based on: novel The Green Ribbon by Edgar Wallace
- Produced by: Jack Greenwood
- Starring: Jack Hedley; Jacqueline Ellis; Patrick Magee
- Cinematography: Bert Mason
- Edited by: Derek Holding
- Music by: Bernard Ebbinghouse; Ron Goodwin (composer: additional music – uncredited)
- Production company: Merton Park Studios
- Distributed by: Anglo-Amalgamated Film Distributors (UK)
- Release date: 1961
- Running time: 61 mins
- Country: United Kingdom
- Language: English

Never Back Losers is a 1961 British 'B' crime film directed by Robert Tronson and starring Jack Hedley, Jacqueline Ellis and Patrick Magee. It was written by Lucas Heller based on the 1929 novel The Green Ribbon by Edgar Wallace. It was one of the Edgar Wallace Mysteries series, produced at Merton Park Studios in the early 1960s.

== Plot ==
Horse racing jockey Wally Sanders loses a race, crashes his car, and a claim is made on his insurance. Jim Matthews, a shrewd insurance investigator, follows up the company's suspicion of foul play and finds himself deep in a web of gambling and corruption surrounding the racetrack.

== Cast ==
- Jack Hedley as Jim Matthews
- Jacqueline Ellis as Marion Parker
- Patrick Magee as Ben Black
- Richard Warner as Crabtree
- Derek Francis as R. R. Harris
- Austin Trevor as Colonel Warburton
- Harry Locke as Burnside
- Larry Martyn as Clive Parker
- Howard Pays as Freddie
- Hilda Barry as Mrs Sanders
- George Tovey as Wally Sanders
- Larry Taylor as Reilly
- Harold Goodwin as Floyd
- Douglas Bradley-Smith as Carter
- Tenniel Evans as the doctor
- Stanley Morgan as police sergeant

== Critical reception ==
Monthly Film Bulletin wrote: "The first of the Edgar Wallace series to employ one of his crime-and-Turf formats, this unpretentious little film makes good use of Jack Hedley's engagingly diffident personality. Racing scenes occur only at the start and close of the story, which is otherwise unfolded with quiet slickness within betting circles and night-clubs."

Kine Weekly said "The picture revolves around the racecourse, but is a 'who-dunnit' rather than a romance of the Turf. Jack Hedley has quite a way with him as Jim, Jacqueline Ellis is a pert Marion, and Patrick Magee and Harry Locke keep one guessing as Lucky Ben and Burnside. The supporting types, too, ring true. Nightclub scenes relieve the tension, the horse races exhilarate and what few loose strings there are are firmly tied at the finish."
