= Four Square Jane =

1929 novel by Edgar Wallace

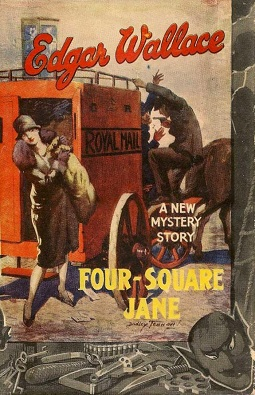
- First edition (US)
- Author: Edgar Wallace
- Language: English
- Genre: Thriller
- Publisher: Readers Library Publishing (UK); World Wide Publishing (US)
- Publication date: 1929
- Publication place: United Kingdom
- Media type: Print

Four Square Jane is a 1929 thriller novel by the British writer Edgar Wallace.

== Plot Overview ==
The novel is a collection of tales published in 1919 and 1920.

1. "The Theft of the Lewinstein Jewels" published in The Weekly News, 13 December 1919
2. "Jane in Custody" published in The Weekly News, 20 December 1919
3. "The Stolen Romney" published in The Weekly News, 27 December 1919
4. "The Murder in James Street" published in The Weekly News, 10 January 1920
5. "Robbing the Royal Mail" published in The Weekly News, 17 January 1920
6. "The Actress's Emerald Necklace" published in The Weekly News, 24 January 1920
7. "The Secret of a Box of Cigars" published in The Weekly News, 31 January 1920
8. "The End" published in The Weekly News, 7 February 1920

== Adaptation ==
In 1961 it was turned into the film The Fourth Square, directed by Allan Davis as part of a long-running series of Wallace films made at Merton Park Studios.

== Bibliography ==
- Goble, Alan. The Complete Index to Literary Sources in Film. Walter de Gruyter, 1999.
