= Death's Door =

Death's Door may refer to:

- Porte des Morts (Death's Door), a strait in Wisconsin
- Death's Door (video game), 2021 video game
- "Death's Door" (The Avengers), episode 18 of season 5 of The Avengers
- "Death's Door" (Depeche Mode song), from the soundtrack to the 1991 film Until the End of the World
