= Poisoner =

Poisoner may refer to:

- Poisoner, someone who uses poison
- “The Poisoners”, original name of a story by Edgar Wallace, first printed without ending in May 1912 as a magazine competition, but completed in The Just Men of Cordova under a new title
- The Poisoner, 1921 police novel by Gerald Cumberland
- The Poisoners (Hamilton novel), a 1971 novel in the Matt Helm spy series by Donald Hamilton
- The Poisoners (Bowen novel), a 1936 historical mystery novel by Marjorie Bowen
- The Poisoner, 1912 short film with Irving Cummings
