= Clue of the Silver Key =

1961 British film by Gerard Glaister

- Directed by: Gerard Glaister
- Written by: Philip Mackie
- Based on: The Clue of the Silver Key by Edgar Wallace
- Produced by: Jack Greenwood; Jim O'Connolly
- Starring: Bernard Lee; Lyndon Brook; Finlay Currie
- Cinematography: Bert Mason
- Edited by: Derek Holding
- Music by: Bernard Ebbinghouse
- Production company: Merton Park Studios
- Distributed by: Anglo-Amalgamated
- Release date: 1961
- Running time: 59 minutes
- Country: United Kingdom
- Language: English

Clue of the Silver Key is a 1961 British second feature ('B') crime film directed by Gerard Glaister and starring Bernard Lee, Lyndon Brook and Finlay Currie. The screenplay was by Philip Mackie based on the 1930 Edgar Wallace novel of the same title. It is part of the series of Edgar Wallace Mysteries films made at Merton Park Studios from 1960 to 1965.

== Cast ==
- Bernard Lee as Superintendent Meredith
- Lyndon Brook as Gerry Domford
- Finlay Currie as Harvey Lane
- Jennifer Daniel as Mary Lane
- Patrick Cargill as Binny
- Derrick Sherwin as Quigley
- Anthony Sharp as Mike Hennessey
- Stanley Morgan as Sergeant Anson
- Sam Kydd as Tickler
- Harold Scott as Crow
- John Kidd as Mr. Hardwick
- Robert Sansom as police doctor
- Patricia Haines as policewoman
- Eve Eden as secretary
- Clifford Earl as detective

== Production ==
The film's sets were designed by the art director Peter Mullins.

== Critical reception ==
The Monthly Film Bulletin wrote: "Smooth staging, a straightforward whodunit plot line, a touch of humour and a strong cast headed by Bernard Lee's painstaking police investigator make this one of the better Edgar Wallace thrillers."
