= The Frog (play) =

1936 thriller play

- Original language: English
- Written by: Ian Hay
- Genre: Thriller

Premiere
- Date: 11 April 1936
- Place: Princes Theatre, London

The Frog is a 1936 thriller play written by Ian Hay, and based on the novel The Fellowship of the Frog by Edgar Wallace.

It ran for 481 performances at the Princes Theatre in London's West End between 11 April 1936 and 5 June 1937. The cast included Gordon Harker, Jack Hawkins, Frank Pettingell, Hugh Burden and Herbert Lomas.

In 1937 a film version The Frog was made, with Gordon Harker and Jack Hawkins reprising their roles.

== Bibliography ==
- Wearing, J.P. The London Stage 1930-1939: A Calendar of Productions, Performers, and Personnel. Rowman & Littlefield, 2014.
