= Man Detained =

1961 British film by Robert Tronson

- Directed by: Robert Tronson
- Written by: Richard Harris
- Based on: A Debt Discharged by Edgar Wallace
- Produced by: Jack Greenwood; Jim O'Connolly
- Starring: Bernard Archard; Elvi Hale; Paul Stassino
- Cinematography: Bert Mason
- Edited by: Robert Jordan Hill
- Music by: Bernard Ebbinghouse
- Production company: Merton Park Studios
- Distributed by: Anglo-Amalgamated
- Release date: October 1961
- Running time: 59 minutes
- Country: United Kingdom
- Language: English

Man Detained is a 1961 British second feature ('B') crime film directed by Robert Tronson and starring Bernard Archard, Elvi Hale and Paul Stassino. The screenplay was by Richard Harris, based on the 1916 Edgar Wallace novel A Debt Discharged. It is part of the series of Edgar Wallace Mysteries films made at Merton Park Studios from 1960 to 1965.

== Plot ==
Frank Murray breaks into the office safe of photographer Thomas Maple. Maple hushes up the fact that £10,000 was taken. When Murray is arrested the police find that the stolen money is counterfeit. Maple is murdered by crime boss James Helder, who had been having an affair with Maple's wife Stella, whom he then abandons. Seeking revenge, Stella alerts Detective Inspector Verity. Helder kidnaps Maple's secretary Kay Simpson because she knows too much. Verity arrests Helder and rescues Kay.

== Cast ==
- Bernard Archard as Detective Inspector Verity
- Elvi Hale as Kay Simpson
- Paul Stassino as James Helder
- Michael Coles as Frank Murray
- Ann Sears as Stella Maple
- Victor Platt as Thomas Maple
- Patrick Jordan as Brand
- Clifford Earl as Detective Sergeant Wentworth
- Gerald Lawson as old man
- Jean Aubrey as Gillian Murray
- Gareth Davies as police constable

== Production ==
The film's sets were designed by the art director Peter Mullins.

== Critical reception ==
The Monthly Film Bulletin wrote: "Taut and vivid addition to the Edgar Wallace series, coolly played by Elvi Hale as the secretary who is a bit too clever for her own good. There are few surprises, but the presentation is quite sound and the thing bowls along at a smart pace."

Kine Weekly wrote: "The picture, the latest Edgar Wallace thriller, cleverly pours a quart of intriguing and exciting crime entertainment into a pint pot. Elvi Hale makes a cool and courageous Verity, Paul Stassino convinces as the evil Helder, and Michael Coles has his moments as the happy-go-lucky, light-fingered Murray. The supporting types, too, spring to life. There are no false starts and the ingenious plot is kept moving at a brisk pace."
