= A Debt Discharged =

1916 novel by Edgar Wallace

- Author: Edgar Wallace
- Language: English
- Genre: Thriller
- Publication date: 1916
- Publication place: United Kingdom
- Media type: Print

A Debt Discharged is a 1916 thriller novel by Edgar Wallace. An American investigator goes in pursuit of a gang forging money on a large scale.

== Film adaptation ==
In 1961, it was turned into the film Man Detained; it was directed by Robert Tronson as part of a long-running series of Wallace films made at Merton Park Studios.

== Bibliography ==
- Goble, Alan. The Complete Index to Literary Sources in Film. Walter de Gruyter, 1999.
