= The Man at the Carlton =

1931 novel

- First edition (US)
- Author: Edgar Wallace
- Language: English
- Genre: Crime
- Publisher: Hodder & Stoughton (UK); Doubleday Crime Club (US)
- Publication date: 1931
- Publication place: United Kingdom
- Media type: Print

The Man at the Carlton is a 1931 crime novel by the British writer Edgar Wallace.

== Film adaptation ==
In 1961 it was turned into the film Man at the Carlton Tower, directed by Robert Tronson as part of a long-running series of Wallace films made at Merton Park Studios.

== Bibliography ==
- Goble, Alan. The Complete Index to Literary Sources in Film. Walter de Gruyter, 1999.
