= The Clue of the Twisted Candle =

1918 novel

- Author: Edgar Wallace
- Language: English
- Genre: Crime
- Publication date: 1918
- Publication place: United Kingdom
- Media type: Print

The Clue of the Twisted Candle is a 1918 crime novel by the British writer Edgar Wallace.

== Plot ==
In this tale, John Lexman, a renowned mystery writer, is drawn into a murder plot by a wealthy benefactor, only to be betrayed and sent to prison. His friend, the Scotland Yard Commissioner T.X. Meredith, tries to prove he was duped into the murder, only to have him escape from prison. Events lead to another murder and a series of surprises.

== Film adaptation ==
In 1960 it was turned into the film Clue of the Twisted Candle, directed by Allan Davis as part of a long-running series of Wallace films made at Merton Park Studios.
