= Solo for Sparrow =

1962 British film by Gordon Flemyng

- Directed by: Gordon Flemyng
- Written by: Roger Marshall
- Based on: novel The Gunner by Edgar Wallace
- Produced by: Jack Greenwood; Abhinandan Nikhanj
- Starring: Anthony Newlands
- Cinematography: Bert Mason
- Edited by: Robert Jordan Hill
- Music by: Bernard Ebbinghouse
- Production company: Merton Park Studios
- Distributed by: Anglo-Amalgamated Film Distributors (U.K.)
- Release date: 1962
- Running time: 56 minutes
- Country: United Kingdom
- Language: English

Solo for Sparrow is a 1962 British second feature ('B') crime film directed by Gordon Flemyng and starring Glyn Houston, Anthony Newlands and Nadja Regin, with Michael Caine in an early supporting role. It was written by Roger Marshall based on the 1928 Edgar Wallace novel The Gunner, and produced by Jack Greenwood and Abhinandan Nikhanj as part of the Edgar Wallace Mysteries series.

The film was released in America in 1966, when the producers capitalised on Caine's new-found fame and released it with his name above the title.

== Plot ==
Inspector Sparrow is a provincial detective. When crooks accidentally kill a shop cashier while stealing the keys to the jewellery shop where she works, Sparrow takes his annual leave and works on the case unofficially. He successfully tracks down the criminals and turns them over to Scotland Yard.

== Cast ==
- Glyn Houston as Inspector Sparrow
- Anthony Newlands as Reynolds
- Nadja Regin as Mrs. Reynolds
- Michael Coles as 'Pin' Norman
- Allan Cuthbertson as Chief Superintendent Symington
- Ken Wayne as Baker
- Jerry Stovin as Lewis
- Jack May as Inspector Hudson
- Murray Melvin as Larkin
- Peter Thomas as Bell
- Michael Caine as Mooney
- Neil McCarthy as Dusty
- Susan Maryott as Sue Warren
- William Gaunt as Detective Sergeant Reeve
- Nancy O'Neil as Miss Martin
- Yvonne Buckingham as Jenny
- Bartlett Mullins as Mr. Walters
- Wanda Ventham as waitress
- Eric Dodson as Dr. Wolfson

== Critical reception ==
The Monthly Film Bulletin wrote: "Fairly routine case of crime and punishment in the Edgar Wallace series, with the sudden flashes of imagination that often redeem these purely commercial operations. Some of the minor crooks are quite skilfully drawn, and a starkly staged interview between Sparrow and a billiard-playing informer is conceived with a real flair for the sinister effect. The thrills are predictable, and the climactic rescue couldn't have been better timed if John Wayne were leading the U.S. Cavalry. But Glyn Houston gives a sturdy performance as Sparrow, and the whole thing is diverting enough."

The Radio Times wrote: "What's it all about, Michael? Two years before his career-making performance in Zulu, the future double Oscar winner was marking time taking small parts in humdrum crime dramas such as this. "
