= Planetoid 127 =

1929 novel by Edgar Wallace

Planetoid 127 is a novel by Edgar Wallace published in 1929.

== Plot summary ==
Planetoid 127 is a novel in which Professor Colson of Earth uses a device to communicate with its sister planet (on the far side of the Sun) to get stock market results in advance.

== Reception ==
Dave Langford reviewed Planetoid 127 in 1987, for White Dwarf #87, calling it "a rare SF venture by the doyen of hack thrillers."

== Reviews ==
- Review by Bill Collins (1987) in Fantasy Review, April 1987
- Review by Don D'Ammassa (1987) in Science Fiction Chronicle, #92 May 1987
- Review by Tom A. Jones (1987) in Vector 138
