= The Lady of Ascot =

1930 novel

- First edition (publ. Hutchinson)
- Author: Edgar Wallace
- Language: English
- Genre: crime novel
- Publisher: Hutchinson
- Publication date: 1930
- Publication place: British
- Media type: Print (hardcover)
- Pages: 288 (first single-volume edition)

The Lady of Ascot is a 1930 crime novel by British writer Edgar Wallace. It is a loose novelisation of Wallace's 1921 play M'Lady, about a woman attempting to raise her daughter in high society, whose plans are threatened by the return of her husband, who has been serving a sentence at Broadmoor for the murder of a police officer.

== Bibliography ==
- Amnon Kabatchnik. Blood on the Stage, 1975-2000: Milestone Plays of Crime, Mystery, and Detection : an Annotated Repertoire. Rowman & Littlefield, 2012.
