= The Gunner =

1928 novel by Edgar Wallace

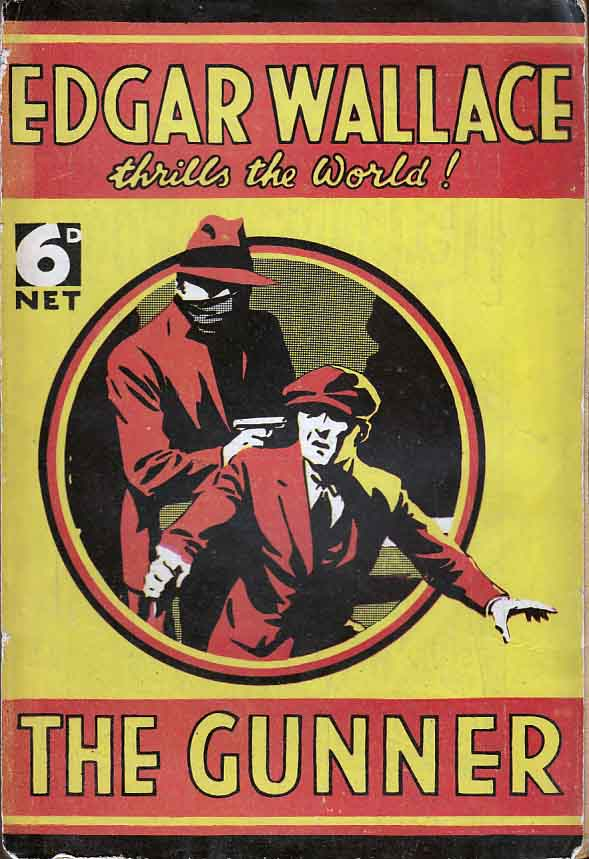
- Author: Edgar Wallace
- Language: English
- Genre: Crime
- Publisher: John Long Ltd
- Publication date: 1928
- Publication place: United Kingdom
- Media type: Print

The Gunner is a 1928 crime novel by the British writer Edgar Wallace.

== Film adaptation ==
In 1962 it was turned into the film Solo for Sparrow, directed by Gordon Flemyng as part of a long-running series of Wallace films made at Merton Park Studios.

== Bibliography ==
- Goble, Alan. The Complete Index to Literary Sources in Film. Walter de Gruyter, 1999.
