= The Green Ribbon (novel) =

1929 novel

- First edition (US)
- Author: Edgar Wallace
- Language: English
- Genre: Crime
- Publisher: Hutchinson (UK); The Crime Club (US)
- Publication date: 1929
- Publication place: United Kingdom
- Media type: Print

The Green Ribbon is a 1929 crime novel by the British writer Edgar Wallace. Like a number of Wallace's novels it is set against the backdrop of the horseracing world.

== Film adaptation ==
In 1961 it was turned into the film Never Back Losers, directed by Robert Tronson as part of a long-running series of Wallace films made at Merton Park Studios.

== Bibliography ==
- Goble, Alan. The Complete Index to Literary Sources in Film. Walter de Gruyter, 1999.
