= Pretty Polly (film) =

1967 British film by Guy Green

- Directed by: Guy Green
- Written by: Willis Hall; Keith Waterhouse
- Based on: Pretty Polly Barlow by Noël Coward
- Produced by: George W. George; Frank Granat
- Starring: Hayley Mills; Shashi Kapoor; Trevor Howard; Brenda De Banzie
- Cinematography: Arthur Ibbetson
- Edited by: Frank Clarke
- Music by: Michel Legrand
- Production company: George-Granat Productions
- Distributed by: Rank Film Distributors; Universal Pictures (UK)
- Release date: 20 September 1967
- Running time: 102 minutes
- Country: United Kingdom
- Language: English
- Budget: £590,416 or £601,841

Pretty Polly (also known as A Matter of Innocence) is a 1967 British comedy film directed by Guy Green and starring Hayley Mills, Shashi Kapoor, Trevor Howard and Brenda De Banzie. It was written by Willis Hall and Keith Waterhouse based on the 1964 short story Pretty Polly Barlow by Noël Coward. The film is largely set in Singapore.

== Plot ==
Miss Polly Barlow decides to leave England and spend a few months with her wealthy spinster aunt as a traveling companion. While in Singapore, the sudden demise of her aunt leaves her alone to pursue her freedom and explore an arms'-length romance with a local Indian Singaporean tour guide, Amaz.

== Cast ==
- Hayley Mills as Polly Barlow
- Trevor Howard as Robert Hook
- Shashi Kapoor as Amaz
- Brenda de Banzie as Mrs. Innes-Hook
- Dick Patterson as Rick Preston
- Kalen Liu as Lorelei
- Peter Bayliss as Critch
- Patricia Routledge as Miss Gudgeon
- Dorothy Alison as Mrs. Barlow
- David Prosser as Ambrose
- Toni Murphy as lady tourist
- Ric Young as Lim Kee (as Eric Young)
- Sarah Abdullah
- Anthony Chinn as Japanese proprietor
- S.Y. Han as oculist

== Original story ==
The film was based on Pretty Polly Barlow, a short story by Noël Coward. It was published in 1964 in a three-story collection titled Pretty Polly and Other Stories.

Coward wrote in his diary on 27 December 1964 that the collection "has not received one really good notice. A few quite good, a lot very bad and all brief and patronising. It is foolish for a writer constantly to decry the critics; it is also foolish, I think, for the critic to so constantly decry anyone who writes as well as I do." Coward admitted the story Pretty Polly Barlow was "conventional in theme, but it is at moments very funny and eminently readable."

== 1966 British television version ==
The story was sold to British television. On 21 March 1965, Coward wrote that William Marchant, who adapted it "has done a fine job on the television script of Pretty Polly, so good is it that I would like him to do the movie script as well."

The British televised film of the short story, starring Lynn Redgrave and Donald Houston, aired in July 1966 as part of Armchair Theatre. Bill Bain directed it.

=== Cast ===
- Lynn Redgrave as Polly Barlow
- Donald Houston as Robert Hook
- Zia Mohyeddin as Amaz
- Stuart Cooper as Rick Barlow
- Vincent Harding as Gunther
- Dandy Nichols as Mrs. Innes Hook
- Leon Sinden as Archie Critch
- Derek Smee as Ambrose
- Lillias Walker as Miss Gudgeon

== Film production ==
On 16 May 1965, Coward wrote "there have been great complications over the Pretty Polly film deal but we hope that everything will be straightened out."

In November 1965, it was reported that the film rights had been purchased by the Broadway producing team of George W George and Frank Granat, who would make the movie in association with Universal. Filming was to start the next June in Hong Kong with interiors shot in London. Keith Waterhouse and Willis Hall were signed to write the screenplay, and Coward would write a title song.

The film was part of a slate of four movies that Universal was making in Britain under the auspices of Jay Kanter, the studio's head of operations there. The other films were The Countess from Hong Kong, Fahrenheit 451 and Charlie Bubbles.

Filming was delayed a number of months. In June 1966, it was announced that Sidney J. Furie may direct. In September 1966, it was announced that Noël Coward would direct the film, which would star Carol Lynley, who had just made Bunny Lake is Missing (1965) with Coward. However, by December Hayley Mills was signed to star, with Guy Green to direct.

Mills had recently done a nude scene for The Family Way and formed a relationship with that film's director, Roy Boulting. Of her Pretty Polly role, she said, "No nude scenes but it's pretty sexy."

The male lead went to Shashi Kapoor on the strength of his performance in Shakespeare Wallah. He was the first Indian to play the lead in an international film. Director Guy Green later stated that one of his mistakes in making the film was not casting George Hamilton, who he had worked with on Light in the Piazza as the Indian "because he had that cynical edge to it which Shashi who was marvellous didn't have at all." Green was "loath to bring George up at the time" because the actor's career was not going strongly at the time "so I didn't think I would get him. But I should have pushed for him because I think he would've made a lot of difference to the picture." Green felt Hamilton "would've done the Indian accent very amusingly" and "gotten the nuances" of the character. Green called the film "a bit of a mistake."

=== Shooting ===
Filming began in Singapore in February 1967. The cast and crew were based at Raffles Hotel. After six weeks in Singapore, the unit relocated to Pinewood Studios in London. The film's sets were designed by the art director Peter Mullins.

The title song was composed by Michel Legrand and sung by Matt Monro.

== Reception ==
On 22 June 1967, Coward wrote in his diary:

I... watched, with mounting irritation, the film of Pretty Polly which, as I deduced from the first script, was common, unsubtle and vulgar. Nobody was good in it and Trevor Howard was horrid. When I think of his charm and subtley in Brief Encounter. Hayley, poor child, did her best, but there was no hope with that script and that director. Guy Green should have remained a cameraman.

The Monthly Film Bulletin wrote: "Noel Coward's cynical little anecdote has already been dramatised for television, where it had just the right dimensions for a short, slightly dated comedy of character. But Technicolor and the wide screen have tempted adapters Waterhouse and Hall to indulge in a riot of local colour which nearly swamps the admittedly slender plot; and they have written in a host of minor characters who, with the connivance of director Guy Green, are allowed to degenerate into stock figures from an old-fashioned farce. ... Hayley Mills has neither the comedy style nor the little touch of malice to make Polly believable, and Shashi Kapoor, though he has plenty of charm, is altogether too wholesome for Amaz. Only Trevor Howard as the disillusioned Bob, shacked up with his vicious Chinese whore, has the right abrasive approach. In short, the film falls heavily between two stools: it has been sweetened, but not enough to make it simply a vehicle for Hayley Mills. And in the process most of the sour flavour of the original has been lost."

Variety wrote: "Derived from a Noel Coward short-story – itself written in the vein of Somerset Maugham – the script (by Keith Waterhouse and Willis Hall) goes all out for sentiment, and, on its undemanding level, achieves it. Guy Green makes effective use of Singapore locations – especially of seaboard sunsets, where the couple canoodle, and of colorful street scenes in the red-light district. The whole thing has the old-fashioned air of glossy romance in a woman's magazine idiom. That should be its strength at the b.o."

Filmink argued the film "all seems very slight. It lacks something – extra characterisation, location footage, a plot twist" adding Mills was "actually quite good in the part, incidentally – better than the film, something that would become a recurring theme in her later career."

== Notes ==
- Coward, Noel (1982). Noel Coward Diaries. Little, Brown and Company. ISBN 9780316695503.

== See also ==
- Pollyanna (1960 film)
