= Mark of the Frog =

1928 film

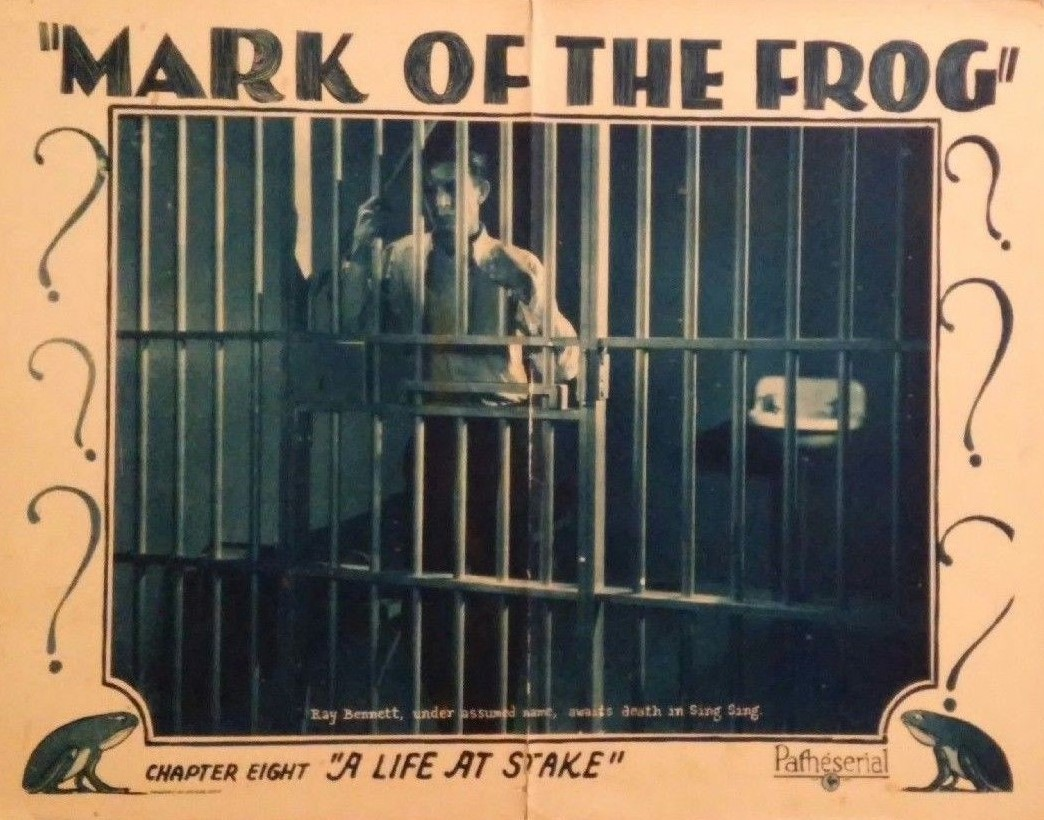
- Directed by: Arch Heath
- Written by: Edgar Wallace (novel The Fellowship of the Frog)
- Starring: Donald Reed; Margaret Morris
- Distributed by: Pathé Exchange
- Release date: March 25, 1928
- Running time: 10 episodes
- Country: United States
- Language: Silent with English intertitles

Mark of the Frog is a 1928 American drama 10-chapter film serial directed by Arch Heath and written by Edgar Wallace. The film is now considered to be lost.

== Plot ==
In search of missing treasure, a crime ring headed by the hooded "Frog" terrorizes New York.

== Cast ==
- Donald Reed
- Margaret Morris
- George Harcourt
- Gus De Weil
- Frank Lackteen
- Charles Anthony Hughes (as Tony Hughes)
- Frank B. Miller
- Helen Greene
- Ed Roseman
- Sidney Paxton
- Morgan Jones

== Chapter titles ==
1. The Gas Attack
2. Decoyed
3. The Jail Delivery
4. Triple Vengeance
5. The Enemy Within
6. Cross Fire
7. Framed
8. A Life At Stake
9. A Race With Death
10. Paying The Penalty

== See also ==
- List of film serials
- List of film serials by studio
- The Frog (1937)
- The Return of the Frog (1938)
- Der Frosch mit der Maske (1959)
