= Jennifer Jayne =

English actress (1931–2006)

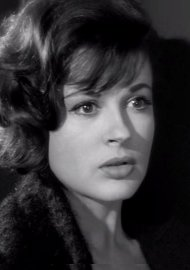
- Born: Jennifer Jayne Jones; 14 November 1931; Yorkshire, England
- Died: 23 April 2006 (aged 74); London, England
- Occupation: Actress
- Years active: 1948–1985
- Spouse: Peter Mullins (1958–2006; her death)

Jennifer Jayne (14 November 1931 – 23 April 2006) was an English film and television actress born in Yorkshire to theatrical parents. Born Jennifer Jayne Jones, she adopted her stage name of Jennifer Jayne to avoid confusion with the Hollywood actress Jennifer Jones.

== Career ==
Her film debut was a minor walk-on in Once a Jolly Swagman (1948), followed by The Blue Lamp (1949). Both of these starred Dirk Bogarde and she also appeared in the mystery Black Widow, in 1951, with Anthony Forwood. After guest appearances in the television series The Adventures of Robin Hood (1955), The Adventures of Sir Lancelot (1956), and Sword of Freedom (1957), she was cast as the hero's wife in the next historical adventure series from the film-making division of Lew Grade's ATV, The Adventures of William Tell (1958).

She was a romantic lead in Raising the Wind (1961), set in a music academy and in Band of Thieves (1962), a musical comedy; she was also the leading lady in a Norman Wisdom vehicle, On the Beat (1962).

Under the pseudonym Jay Fairbank, she wrote the screenplays for Tales That Witness Madness (1973) and Son of Dracula (1974)

== Personal life ==
She was married to art director Peter Mullins from 1958 until her death in 2006, aged 74.

== Filmography ==
- Once a Jolly Swagman (1949) – Autograph Hunter (uncredited)
- Poet's Pub (1949) – Cyclist (uncredited)
- The Blue Lamp (1950) – June (uncredited)
- There Is Another Sun (1951) – Dora
- The Black Widow (1951) – Sheila Kemp
- It's a Grand Life (1953) – Pvt. Desmond
- A Yank in Ermine (1955) – Enid
- The Adventures of Robin Hood (1956) – Olivia in the episode Will Scarlet
- The Adventures of Sir Lancelot (1956) – Iolta
- The End of the Line (1957) – Ann
- The Man Who Wouldn't Talk (1958) – (uncredited)
- A Woman of Mystery (1958) – Ruby Ames
- The Trollenberg Terror (released in the US as The Crawling Eye) (1958) – Sarah Pilgrim
- Mark of the Phoenix (1958) – Airline Ticket Clerk
- Dial 999 (TV series) – ('A Mined Area'; episode 21) (1959) – Louise
- Whiplash - ('The Actress'; episode 8 (1960) - Genevieve Rochelle
- Raising the Wind (1961) – Jill Clemons
- Band of Thieves (1962) – Anne
- On the Beat (1962) – Rosanna Guardia
- Clash by Night (1963) – Nita Lord
- Dr. Terror's House of Horrors (1965) – Nicolle Carroll (segment "Vampire")
- Hysteria (1965) – Gina McConnell
- The Saint (TV series) – ('The Abductors'; season 4, episode 2) (1965) – Olga Geraldi
- The Liquidator (1965) – Janice Benedict
- They Came from Beyond Space (1967) – Lee Mason
- The Medusa Touch (1978) – Mother
- The Jigsaw Man (1983) – Nurse
- The Doctor and the Devils (1985) – Barmaid (final film role)
