= The Big Foot =

1927 novel by Edgar Wallace

Big Foot
- Author: Edgar Wallace
- Language: English
- Genre: crime novel
- Publisher: John Long Ltd
- Publication date: 1927
- Publication place: United Kingdom
- Media type: Print (Hardcover)
- Pages: 286 pp.
- OCLC: 12633431

Big Foot is a 1927 crime novel by Edgar Wallace.

A woman is found dead in a locked room, Big Foot's threats all about but Sooper is more concerned about a singing tramp.

The brutal murder of a woman in a lonely beach cottage, huge footprints found nearby, a meandering tramp singing snatches of opera in the night! Superintendent Minter - "Sooper", rattles around the countryside on his noisy motorbike and tries to find a connection.

Hampered by amateur detective Gordon Cardew, aided and admired by lawyer Jim Ferraby and the beautiful Elfa Leigh, Sooper finds the case further complicated by another murder. The mysterious `Big Foot' anticipates Minter's every move and only by delving into the past does he solve the case and bring the villain to justice.
