= Again the Three Just Men =

1928 novel by Edgar Wallace

- Author: Edgar Wallace
- Language: English
- Genre: Thriller
- Publication date: 1928
- Publication place: United Kingdom
- Media type: Print
- Preceded by: The Three Just Men

Again the Three Just Men is a 1928 British thriller novel by Edgar Wallace, sometimes known simply as Again the Three.

It is the last of six novels in the Four Just Men series, featuring a gang of vigilantes committed to fighting crime whatever the methods.

== Film adaptation ==
The story provided loose inspiration for the 1966 film Circus of Fear.
