= The Law of the Four Just Men =

1921 novel by Edgar Wallace

- Author: Edgar Wallace
- Language: English
- Genre: Thriller
- Publication date: 1921
- Publication place: United Kingdom
- Media type: Print
- Preceded by: The Just Men of Cordova
- Followed by: The Three Just Men

The Law of the Four Just Men is a 1921 thriller novel by the British writer Edgar Wallace. It was the fourth in a series of stories featuring The Four Just Men, a group of vigilante crime fighters.

== Bibliography ==
- Victor E. Neuburg. The Batsford Companion to Popular Literature. Batsford Academic and Educational, 1982.
