= Allan Cuthbertson =

Australian actor (1920–1988)

- in The Avengers episode "Death's Door" (1967)
- Born: Allan Darling Cuthbertson; 7 April 1920; Perth, Western Australia, Australia
- Died: 8 February 1988 (aged 67); London, England
- Years active: 1947–1987
- Spouse: Gertrude Willner (m. 1949)
- Children: 1

Allan Darling Cuthbertson (7 April 1920 – 8 February 1988) was an Australian actor. He was best known for playing stern-faced military officers in British films of the 1950s and 1960s.

== Early life ==
Cuthbertson was born in Perth, Western Australia, son of Ernest and Isobel Ferguson (Darling) Cuthbertson. He performed on stage and radio from an early age.

During the Second World War, he served as a flight lieutenant with the Royal Australian Air Force from 6 December 1941 to 1 July 1947, including service with 111 Air Sea Rescue Flight.

== Career ==
Cuthbertson arrived in Britain in 1947, and appeared shortly thereafter as Romeo in Romeo and Juliet at the Boltons. In London's West End, he appeared as Laertes in Hamlet, Aimwell in The Beaux Stratagem, and Octavius Robinson in Man and Superman, among many other roles.

He was often cast in military roles, which was quite common in actors of his generation, especially those with a military air about them. He made a brief appearance as a harassed staff officer, who then gets blown up, at the beginning of Ice Cold in Alex (1958). He was Captain Eric Simpson in Tunes of Glory (1960) as well as being cast as more stuffy regimental types in such films as Carrington V.C. (1954) and The Guns of Navarone (1961), (both of which starred David Niven) and as the callous and officious Colonel Cavendish in The 7th Dawn (1964) with William Holden. In 1961 he appeared in the TV series Danger Man in the episode entitled "The Island" as Mr. Wilson. In 1962 he played a school teacher in Term of Trial with Laurence Olivier. He appeared four times in the television series The Avengers.

Cuthbertson also had a talent for playing comedy, which led to his best known role, although again playing a mustachioed military character, as Colonel Hall in the "Gourmet Night" episode of the hit sitcom Fawlty Towers in 1975. He appeared in many roles on British television, including with Tommy Cooper, Dick Emery and Frankie Howerd, and in All Gas and Gaiters, Gideon's Way episode The V Men (1964) as Chief Supt Bill Parsons and episode The Thin Red Line (1965) as Major Donald Ross, The Avengers (1965 episode Death at Bargain Prices as Fotheringale and 1967 episode Death's Door as Lord Melford), The Champions (1969 episode The Experiment as Cranmore), Danger Man, UFO (1970 episode "The Square Triangle"), an episode of The Persuaders! as Colonel Wright and Terry and June, where he played annoying neighbour Tarquin Spry. He was a regular guest on The Morecambe & Wise Show from 1973 to 1976. In the acclaimed 1985 Suspense Serial, Edge of Darkness, Allan played as Investigative Speaker Mr. Chilwell. One of his last TV appearances was in Michael Palin's East of Ipswich in 1987.

One of his last stage roles was in The Corn Is Green by Emlyn Williams at the Old Vic in 1985.

== Personal life ==
Cuthbertson was long married to Dr Gertrude Willner, a refugee from Nazi-occupied Czechoslovakia, who had been a lawyer originally, but became a teacher in Britain. They had an adopted son.

At the time of his death, Cuthbertson was living in Surbiton, Greater London.

== Filmography ==
- Misalliance (1954) - Joseph Percival
- Carrington V.C. (1954) – Lt. Col. Henniker
- Portrait of Alison (1955) – Henry Carmichael
- On Such a Night (1956) – 1st Gentleman
- Doublecross (1956) – Clifford
- Cloak Without Dagger (1956) – Colonel Packham
- The Man Who Never Was (1956) – Vice-Admiral
- Eyewitness (1956) – Det Insp (uncredited)
- Anastasia (1956) – Blond Man (uncredited)
- The Passionate Stranger (1957) – Dr. Stevenson
- Yangtse Incident: The Story of H.M.S. Amethyst (1957) – Captain Donaldson RN
- A Wasp in Cloisters (1957) – Reverend John Matthews
- Barnacle Bill (1957) – Chailey
- Law and Disorder (1958) – Police Inspector
- Ice Cold in Alex (1958) – Brigadier's Staff Officer
- I Was Monty's Double (1958) – Guards Officer
- Room at the Top (1959) – George Aisgill
- The Crowning Touch (1959) – Philip
- Shake Hands with the Devil (1959) – Captain
- The Devil's Disciple (1959) – British Captain
- Killers of Kilimanjaro (1959) – Sexton
- North West Frontier (1959) – Monocled Officer (uncredited)
- The Stranglers of Bombay (1960) – Capt. Christopher Connaught-Smith
- Tunes of Glory (1960) – Capt. Eric Simpson
- The Malpas Mystery (1960) – Lacey Marshalt
- Man at the Carlton Tower (1961)
- The Guns of Navarone (1961) – Maj. Baker
- On the Double (1961) – Captain Patterson
- Solo for Sparrow (1962) – Supt. Symington
- Term of Trial (1962) – Sylvan-Jones
- The Boys (1962) – Randolph St. John
- The Brain (1962) – Da Silva (uncredited)
- The Fast Lady (1962) – Bodley
- Freud: The Secret Passion (1962) – Wilkie
- Nine Hours to Rama (1963) – Capt. Goff
- The Running Man (1963) – Jenkins
- The Mouse on the Moon (1963) – Member of Whitehall Conference
- Tamahine (1963) – Housemaster
- Bitter Harvest (1963) – Mr. Eccles
- The Informers (1963) – Smythe
- The 7th Dawn (1964) – Colonel Cavendish
- Operation Crossbow (1965) – German Technical Examiner
- Life at the Top (1965) – George Aisgill
- Game for Three Losers (1965) – Garsden
- Cast a Giant Shadow (1966) – Immigration Officer
- Press for Time (1966) – Mr. Ballard
- The Trygon Factor (1966) – Det. Thompson
- Jules Verne's Rocket to the Moon (1967) – Scuttling
- Half a Sixpence (1967) – Wilkins
- Sinful Davey (1969) – Captain Douglas
- The Body Stealers (1969) – Hindesmith
- Captain Nemo and the Underwater City (1969) – Lomax
- The Adventurers (1970) – Hugh
- One More Time (1970) – Belton
- Performance (1970) – The Lawyer
- The Firechasers (1971) – D.O Jarvis
- Assault (1971) – Coroner
- Paul Temple (TV series), episode "Catch Your Death" (1971) – Robert O'Keefe
- Diamonds on Wheels (1974) – Gus Ashley
- Fawlty Towers, episode "Gourmet Night" (1975) – Colonel Hall
- The Outsider (1979) – Stanley
- The Sea Wolves (1980) – Melborne
- Hopscotch (1980) – Chartermain
- The Mirror Crack'd (1980) – Peter Montrose ('Murder at Midnight')
- The Winds of War (miniseries), episodes "Cataclysm" & "The Changing of the Guard" (1983) – Maj. Gen. Tillet
- Edge of Darkness (miniseries), episodes 3-6 (1985) - Mr. Chilwell
- Thirteen at Dinner (1985) – Sir Montague Corner
- East of Ipswich (1987) – Mr. Horrobin
