= The Council of Justice =

1908 novel by Edgar Wallace

- Author: Edgar Wallace
- Language: English
- Genre: Thriller
- Publisher: Ward, Lock & Co.
- Publication date: 1908
- Publication place: United Kingdom
- Media type: Print
- OCLC: 1119968667
- Preceded by: The Four Just Men
- Followed by: The Just Men of Cordova

The Council of Justice is a 1908 thriller novel by the British writer Edgar Wallace. It is a sequel to the 1905 novel The Four Just Men, and continues the adventures of the heroes of that work. It was followed by four further sequels.

== Bibliography ==
- Jonathan Freedman. The Temple of Culture: Assimilation and Anti-Semitism in Literary Anglo-America. Oxford University Press, 2002.
