= The Guv'nor and Other Short Stories =

Short story compilation by Edgar Wallace

The Guv'nor and Other Short Stories (Collins, 1932) is a short story compilation by the British crime writer Edgar Wallace.

These are the final stories about Mr. J. G. Reeder, a detective with "the mind of a criminal". They include

- "The Guv'nor"
- "The Man Who Passed" ("The Man from Sing Sing")
- "The Shadow Man"
- "The Treasure House"

In America the book was published as Mr. Reeder Returns (The Crime Club, Doubleday, Doran, 1932) with the stories in a different order: "The Guv'nor", "The Man from Sing Sing", "The Treasure House", and "The Shadow Man".

A later (1965) edition Mr. J. G. Reeder Returns contains only "The Treasure House" and "The Shadow Man". The 1969 imprint was a tie in with the 1969 Thames Television series The Mind of Mr. J.G. Reeder, starring Hugh Burden.
