= Rogue's March (film) =

1953 film by Allan Davis

- Directed by: Allan Davis; Uncredited: Geoffrey Barkas
- Written by: Leon Gordon
- Produced by: Leon Gordon
- Starring: Peter Lawford; Richard Greene; Janice Rule
- Cinematography: Paul C. Vogel
- Edited by: Gene Ruggiero
- Music by: Alberto Colombo
- Production company: Metro-Goldwyn-Mayer
- Distributed by: Metro-Goldwyn-Mayer
- Release date: February 13, 1953
- Running time: 84 minutes
- Country: United States
- Language: English
- Budget: $659,000
- Box office: $707,000

Rogue's March is a 1953 American historical adventure film directed by Allan Davis, with special location sequences directed by Geoffrey Barkas, and starring Peter Lawford, Richard Greene, and Janice Rule. It was partly shot on location in the Khyber Pass.

== Plot ==
In the Victorian era, a British officer is falsely accused of treason and drummed out of his regiment. He re-enlists as a private under an assumed name and tries to prove his innocence.

== Cast ==
- Peter Lawford as Capt. Dion Lenbridge/Pvt. Harry Simms
- Richard Greene as Capt. Thomas Garron
- Janice Rule as Jane Wensley
- Leo G. Carroll as Col. Lenbridge
- John Abbott as Herbert Bielensen
- Patrick Aherne as Maj. Wensley
- John Dodsworth as Maj. Mac Street
- Herbert Deans as Prosecutor
- Hayden Rorke as Maj. Fallow
- John Lupton as Lt. Jersey
- Barry Bernard as Sergeant
- Charles Davis as Cpl. Biggs
- Jack Raine as Gen. Woodberry
- Richard Hale as Emissary
- Michael Pate as Crane
- Skelton Knaggs as Fish
- Sean McClory as McGinty
- Otto Waldis as Alex
- Hugh French as Capt. Foster
- Leslie Denison as Lt. Col. Harvill
- Pat conway as Lt
- Phyllis Stanley as Mabel
- Robin Hughes as Captain Ashe
- James Craven as Renford
- Wallis Clark as Brooks
- Bruce Lester as Wilson
- Patrick O'Moore as Major Bennett
- Lester Matthews as Brigadier General
- Lumsden Hare as President
- Elaine Stewart as Nurse
- Stuart Holmes as Member of Court Martial Board

== Production ==
MGM made the film in the wake of their success with Kim (1950). That film was written by Leon Gordon, who wrote and produced this. The film was to have starred Stewart Granger and involve extensive location shooting in the Khyber Pass. Patricia Neal was to co star.

However eventually Peter Lawford was cast instead. Directing duties were given to Allan Davis of the Old Vic Company, who was on a tour of American university theatres for the Rockefeller Foundation before being offered an MGM directing contract; in the event, it turned out to be the only film he made for the studio.

Filming started 28 April 1952.

Rogue's March was Lawford's last film under contract to MGM. The cast also included Lawford's father, Lieutenant General Sir Sidney Turing Barlow Lawford, who died of natural causes two days after the film's February 13, 1953 opening.

== Reception ==
According to MGM records, the film earned $379,000 in the US and Canada and $328,000 elsewhere, making a loss to the studio of $247,000.
