= The Nine Bears =

1910 novel by Edgar Wallace

- Author: Edgar Wallace
- Language: English
- Genre: Thriller
- Publisher: Ward Lock
- Publication date: 1910
- Publication place: United Kingdom
- Media type: Print
- Followed by: The Fellowship of the Frog

The Nine Bears is a 1910 British thriller novel by Edgar Wallace. It was originally written in serial form before being published as a novel. After signing a contract with American firm Dodd Mead, Wallace provided them with what effectively an extended version of this story with the villain's name changed to Poltavo, which was published by them as The Other Man. It was the first in a series of books featuring Wallace's fictional Scotland Yard detective Elk, whose rank varies during the series. It is also known by the alternative title The Cheaters.

== Synopsis ==
A group of shady financiers led by a man named Silinksi make a fortune on the stock market by anticipating the likelihood of disasters which they are orchestrating themselves.

== Bibliography ==
- Clark, Neil. Stranger than Fiction: The Life of Edgar Wallace, the Man Who Created King Kong. Stroud, UK: The History Press, 2015.
