= The Clue of the Silver Key =

1930 novel

- First US edition
- Author: Edgar Wallace
- Language: English
- Genre: Crime
- Publisher: Hodder & Stoughton (UK); Doubleday Doran (US)
- Publication date: 1930
- Publication place: United Kingdom
- Media type: Print

The Clue of the Silver Key is a 1930 thriller novel by the British writer Edgar Wallace.

Surefoot Smith of Scotland Yard is called in to investigate when petty thief Tom Tickler is killed and left in a taxi with £100 in his pocket. His discoveries eventually lead him towards the mysterious businessman Washington Wirth.

== Adaptation ==
In 1961 it was made into a film Clue of the Silver Key directed by Gerard Glaister and starring Bernard Lee and Finlay Currie. It was made as part of the Edgar Wallace Mysteries film series produced by Anglo-Amalgamated.
