= M'Lady (play) =

1921 British play

- Written by: Edgar Wallace
- Original language: English
- Genre: Crime drama

Premiere
- Date premiered: 18 July 1921
- Place premiered: Playhouse Theatre, London

M'Lady is a 1921 play by the British writer Edgar Wallace. It is a drama about a woman who tries to raise her daughter in high society, only for her husband to return from Broadmoor where he has been serving a sentence for killing a police officer. It was panned by theatre critics.

It ran for twenty three performances at the Playhouse Theatre in the West End. The original cast included Frederick Leister, Frederick Worlock and Henrietta Watson.

In 1930 Wallace adapted the play into a novel The Lady of Ascot.

== Bibliography ==
- Kabatchnik, Amnon. Blood on the Stage, 1975-2000: Milestone Plays of Crime, Mystery, and Detection : an Annotated Repertoire. Rowman & Littlefield, 2012.
- Wearing, J. P. The London Stage 1920-1929: A Calendar of Productions, Performers, and Personnel. Rowman & Littlefield, 2014.
