= Penelope Wallace =

Margaret Penelope June Wallace (30 May 1923 – 13 January 1997) was an English crime writer and the daughter of Edgar Wallace.

Educated at Rodean, she established the Edgar Wallace Society in 1968 and remained its president until she died. She was active within the Society of Woman Journalists, and became its chair in 1982. In the 1980s, she became chair of the London Press Club, which had only begun to admit women in 1972 and was also chair of the Crime Writers' Association (1980), after long-term membership. She died in Oxford.

She wrote five novels; four of them were only published in Germany. She wrote A Clutch of Bastards (Tallis, 1988, ISBN 0284988251). Wallace modernised several of her father's most commercially successful thrillers.
