= The Frog (film) =

- Noah Beery, Gordon Harker & Jack Hawkins
- Directed by: Jack Raymond
- Written by: Ian Hay (adaptation); Gerald Elliott (screenplay)
- Based on: novel The Fellowship of the Frog by Edgar Wallace
- Produced by: Herbert Wilcox
- Starring: Gordon Harker; Noah Beery; Jack Hawkins; Carol Goodner
- Cinematography: Freddie Young (as F.A. Young)
- Edited by: Merrill G. White (as Merrill White); Frederick Wilson (as Fred Wilson)
- Production company: Herbert Wilcox Productions
- Distributed by: General Film Distributors (UK)
- Release date: 20 June 1937 (UK)
- Running time: 75 minutes
- Country: United Kingdom
- Language: English

The Frog is a 1937 British crime film directed by Jack Raymond and starring Gordon Harker, Noah Beery, Jack Hawkins and Carol Goodner. It was written by Gerald Elliott based on the 1925 novel The Fellowship of the Frog by Edgar Wallace, and the 1936 play version by Ian Hay. It was followed by a loose sequel The Return of the Frog, the following year.

== Plot ==
The police chase a criminal mastermind who goes by the name of The Frog.

== Cast ==
- Gordon Harker as Sgt. Elk
- Noah Beery as Joshua Broad
- Jack Hawkins as Captain Gordon
- Carol Goodner as Lola Bassano
- Richard Ainley as Ray Bennett
- Vivian Gaye as Stella Bennett
- Esmé Percy as Philo Johnson
- Felix Aylmer as John Bennett
- Cyril Smith as PC Balder
- Harold Franklyn as Hagen
- Gordon McLeod as Chief Commissioner
- Julien Mitchell as John Maitland

== Critical reception ==
Writing for Night and Day in 1937, Graham Greene gave the film a poor review, describing it as "badly directed [and] badly acted". He admitted that "it has an old-world charm" but complained that the "well-mannered dialogue drones on".

The Monthly Film Bulletin wrote: "Those who like Edgar Wallace stories will enjoy the film; others may feel that it is too obvious a thriller to be really thrilling. Gordon Harker makes a vigilant and amusing Elk, but most of the other characters lack vitality and are not convincing enough to add to the excitement."

Film Weekly wrote: "A moderately exciting adaptation of Edgar Wallace's play about racketeer activities in London, well put over by Gordon Harker, Esme Percy and Felix Almer. The rest of the cast are less good, and there are a few dull moments; but Ian Hay's smart dialogue and slick handling of the melodramatic story supply very fair entertainment."

Picturegoer wrote: "It is difficult to understand how such an outstanding crime play as this could have been turned into such a pedestrian and unexciting picture. The identity of the arch-criminal, The Frog, is never in doubt owing to the fact that Esmé Percy's voice – he plays the role and disguises his identity by appearing as an inoffensive secretary to a millionaire – is unmistakable. There is also too much dialogue, and the humour, in spite of Gordon Harker's efforts as Sergeant Elk, is not remarkably funny."

Picture Show wrote: "Gordon Harker is a joy, in this adaptation of the novel by Edgar Wallace. ... His pithy comments, his individual methods, and his expressive face provide much humour to lighten the melodrama. The supporting cast is good and settings convincing."

== See also ==
- Mark of the Frog (1928, film serial)
- Der Frosch mit der Maske (1959)
