= The Four Just Men (novel) =

1905 novel by Edgar Wallace

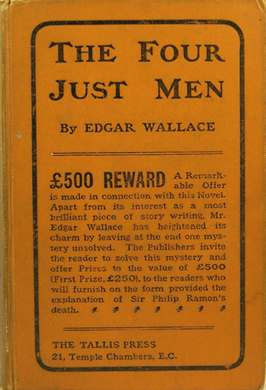
- 1st edition, Tallis Press, 1905
- Author: Edgar Wallace
- Language: English
- Genre: Thriller
- Publisher: Tallis Press
- Publication date: 1905
- Publication place: United Kingdom
- Media type: Print
- Pages: 224
- OCLC: 2037759
- Followed by: The Council of Justice

The Four Just Men is a detective thriller published in 1905 by the British writer Edgar Wallace. The eponymous "Just Men" appear in several sequels.

== Publication ==
Edgar Wallace formed the idea of The Four Just Men — four wealthy gentleman vigilantes (including a European prince) who punish wrong-doers who are beyond the reach of the Law – while returning to England in 1905. He had to create his own publishing company, Tallis Press, to publish it and decided to manage a 'guess the murder method' competition in the Daily Mail with a prize of £1,000 (equivalent in purchasing power to at least £101,000 in 2024). Wallace intended to advertise the book on an unprecedented scale, not just in Britain itself but across the Empire. He approached the proprietor, Lord Northcliffe, for the loan of the £1,000 and was promptly refused, but Wallace pressed ahead anyway. His alarmed workmates at the Mail prevailed upon him to lower the prize money to £500: a £250 first prize, £200 second prize and £50 third prize, but were unable to restrain him in the privacy of his home. Wallace had advertisements placed on buses, hoardings, flyers, and so forth, running up an incredible bill of £2,000. Though he knew he needed the book to sell sufficient copies to make £2,500 before he saw any profit, Wallace was confident that this would be achieved in the first three months of the book going on sale, hopelessly underestimating the expenses.

Enthusiastic, but without any substantial managerial skill, Wallace had also made a far more serious error. He ran the FJM serial competition in the Daily Mail but failed to include any limitation clause in the competition rules restricting payment of the prize money to one winner only from each of the three categories. Only after the competition had closed and the correct solution printed as part of the final chapter denouement did Wallace learn that he was legally obliged to pay every person who answered correctly the full prize amount in that category; if six people got the 1st prize answer right, he would have to pay not £250 but 6 × £250, or £1500, if three people got the 2nd prize it would be £600 and so on.

Additionally, though his advertising gimmick had worked as the novel was a bestseller, Wallace discovered that instead of his woefully over-optimistic three months, FJM would have to continue selling consistently with no margin of error for two full years to recoup the £2,500 he had mistakenly believed he needed to break even. Unfortunately during this period the number of entrants correctly guessing the right answer continued to rise inexorably. Wallace's response was to simply ignore the situation, but circumstances were ominous. As 1906 began and continued without any list of prize winners being printed, more and more suspicions were being voiced about the honesty of the competition. In addition, for a working-class Edwardian family, £250 was a fortune and since those who were winners knew it (courtesy of the published solution) they had been waiting impatiently for the prize to be paid out. Harmsworth, having refused the initial £1,000 loan, was furious at having now to loan over £5,000 to protect the newspaper's reputation because Wallace couldn't pay.

Wallace went bankrupt and hastily sold the rights to the novel for £75 to Sir George Newnes to provide token amounts to his creditors.

In 1910 the murderer Hawley Harvey Crippen was reading a copy of the novel during his journey on the SS Montrose prior to his arrest. Wallace covered his subsequent trial and execution for the Evening Times.

== Sequels ==
The Four Just Men is best known as a stand-alone novel, but Wallace wrote five sequels:

- The Council of Justice (1908)
- The Just Men of Cordova (1917)
- The Law of the Four Just Men (1921)
- The Three Just Men (1925)
- Again the Three (1928)

In 2012 Wordsworth Editions published The Complete Four Just Men, a volume compiling all six books. (ISBN 978-1-84022-684-3)

== Characters ==
The four just men of the original novel are George Manfred, Leon Gonsalez, and Raymond Poiccart, who recruit a fourth, Thery, in their campaign to punish wrong-doers who are beyond the reach of the law. In later books, Wallace develops their backstory. The original fourth man, Merel, had died in Bordeaux, and the remaining three either recruit a fourth ad hoc or operates as a team of three. After The Great War, they are pardoned on condition that they remain within the law, and Poiccart retires to Spain. Gonsalez and Manfred continue to operate a legitimate detective agency.

== Adaptations ==
The Four Just Men was adapted as a silent film in 1921, as a film in 1939 and as a British television series in 1959.

== Bibliography ==
- Clark, Neil. Stranger than Fiction: The Life of Edgar Wallace, the Man Who Created King Kong. Stroud, UK: The History Press, 2015.
