= The Fourth Square =

1961 British film by Allan Davis

- Directed by: Allan Davis
- Written by: James Eastwood
- Based on: Four Square Jane by Edgar Wallace
- Produced by: Jack Greenwood; Jim O'Connolly
- Starring: Conrad Phillips; Natasha Parry; Delphi Lawrence
- Cinematography: Gerald Moss
- Edited by: Derek Holding
- Music by: James Stevens
- Production company: Merton Park Studios
- Distributed by: Anglo-Amalgamated
- Release date: June 1961
- Running time: 57 minutes
- Country: United Kingdom
- Language: English

The Fourth Square is a 1961 British second feature crime film directed by Allan Davis and starring Conrad Phillips, Natasha Parry and Delphi Lawrence. The screenplay was by James Eastwood, based on the 1929 Edgar Wallace novel Four Square Jane. It is part of the series of Edgar Wallace Mysteries films made at Merton Park Studios from 1960 to 1965.

== Plot ==
Nina Stewart and her wealthy husband return to their apartment to find the police waiting for them. Their maid has been found dead, and there are signs the safe has been cracked. Nina checks the safe and reports nothing has been stolen. She goes to see her solicitor Bill Lawrence, and admits that she lied: an emerald ring given to her by millionaire playboy Tom Alvarez, with whom she is having an affair, was stolen from the safe. She says that Henry Adams, her husband's public relations officer, stole it out of jealousy, and asks Lawrence to find it. The police suspect Adams, but he is murdered. Lawrence discovers that Alvarez's estranged wife Josette is the criminal.

== Cast ==
- Conrad Phillips as Bill Lawrence
- Natasha Parry as Sandra Martin
- Delphi Lawrence as Nina Stewart
- Paul Daneman as Henry Adams
- Miriam Karlin as Josette
- Jacqueline Jones as Marie Labonne
- Anthony Newlands as Tom Alvarez
- Basil Dignam as Inspector Forbes
- Harold Kasket as Philippe
- Edward Rees as Sergeant Harris
- Jack Melford as Stewart
- Vilma Ann Leslie as Fiona Foster
- Gwen Williams as Mrs. Potter
- Barrie Ingham as Gordon
- Constance Lorne as lady in hairdressers
- Rachel Lloyd as receptionist
- John Warwick as police Sergeant
- Keith Goodman as 1st uniformed police constable
- Tom Gill as 2nd uniformed police constable
- Edward de Souza as 1st reporter
- Marina Martin as 2nd reporter
- Peter Thomas as 3rd reporter
- Frank Porter as compere
- Nicolas Chagrin as Michel
- George Hilsdon as police constable

== Production ==
The film's sets were designed by the art director Peter Mullins.

== Reception ==
The Monthly Film Bulletin wrote: "Briskly implausible Edgar Wallace thriller, sufficiently suspenseful to hold the interest; acting and direction, too, are quite slick considering the unassuming level of this series."
