= Peter Mullins (art director) =

British art director (born 1931)

- Born: Peter Stuart Mullins; 15 September 1931 (age 95); Holborn, London, England
- Occupations: Art director, Production designer
- Years active: 1947–1993 (film), 1957-2001 (television)

Peter Stuart Mullins (born 15 September 1931) is a British former art director. He was active in British cinema and television production from the 1940s until the 1970s. He was married to the actress Jennifer Jayne.

His television worked included designing the sets for numerous episodes of the series The Adventures of Robin Hood, William Tell and The Invisible Man. In film he contributed to a number of the Edgar Wallace Mysteries series.

== Selected filmography ==
- Clue of the Silver Key (1961)
- Man Detained (1961)
- The Fourth Square (1961)
- Playback (Edgar Wallace Mysteries) (1962)
- King and Country (1964)
- The Verdict (1964)
- The Projected Man (1966)
- Alfie (1966)
- The Spy with a Cold Nose (1966)
- The Penthouse (1967)
- Pretty Polly (1967)
- The Man Outside (1967)
- Where Eagles Dare (1968)
- The Chairman (1969)
- The Last Valley (1971)
- Zee and Co. (1972)
- 11 Harrowhouse (1974)
- The "Human" Factor (1975)
- The Medusa Touch (1978)

== Bibliography ==
- James Palmer & Michael Riley. The Films of Joseph Losey. Cambridge University Press, 1993.
