= Paul Stassino =

Cypriot actor (1933–2012)

Paul Stassino in Thunderball (1965)

Phaedros Stassinos (29 September 1930 – 28 June 2012) was a Greek Cypriot actor whose international stage name was Paul Stassino.

== Early life ==
Stassino was born in Platres and grew up in nearby Limassol, but spent most of his acting career in England. He had moved there at the age of 18 to study law. Without telling his parents, he got a scholarship to the Royal Academy of Dramatic Art.

== Career ==
He appeared in many British films, in British TV dramas such as Adventure Story, Danger Man, Department S and The Saint. He appeared in Coronation Street in 1968, as Hungarian demolition contractor Miklos Zadic who had a brief relationship with Emily Nugent (played by Eileen Derbyshire). Possibly his best known performance was when he played two parts, Major François Derval and Angelo Palazzi, in the James Bond film Thunderball (see List of James Bond henchmen in Thunderball). Other roles include "Le Pirate" in That Riviera Touch, and the first officer of the Colombian ship Paloma in Tiger Bay.

In 1972 he moved to Athens, where he worked as a director in the casino in Athens, and then because of his great love for his island, he moved to his birthplace in Cyprus where he worked in the Public Theatre in Nicosia as an actor and as a director, where after he retired he moved to his beloved Limassol. He died on 28 June 2012 in Limassol and was buried in the cemetery of Limassol Sfalagiotisa.

== Personal life ==
He was married twice and had three children Julian Stassino, Alex Stassino, and Elvi Stassinou.

== Filmography ==
- Ill Met by Moonlight (1957) - Yani Katsias
- Interpol (1957) - Customs Inspector
- Miracle in Soho (1957) - Paulo
- Ice Cold in Alex (1958) - Barman
- The Great Van Robbery (1959) - Toni
- The Man Who Liked Funerals (1959) - Nick Morelli
- Tiger Bay (1959) - 'POLOMA' 1st. Officer
- The Bandit of Zhobe (1959) - Hatti
- The Stranglers of Bombay (1960) - Lt. Silver
- Moment of Danger (1960) - Juan Montoya
- Sands of the Desert (1960) - Pilot
- The Criminal (1960) - Alfredo Fanucci
- Exodus (1960) - Driver-guide on Cyprus
- Man Detained (1961) - James Helder
- The Secret Partner (1961) - Man in Soho Street
- The Roman Spring of Mrs. Stone (1961) - Stefano - The Barber
- Echo of Barbara (1961) - Caledonia
- Sammy Going South (1963) - Spyros Dracandopolous
- Stolen Hours (1963) - Dalporto
- The Long Ships (1964) - Raschid
- The Moon-Spinners (1964) - Lambis
- The Verdict (Edgar Wallace Mysteries) (1964) - Danny Thorne
- The Saint Season 3 Episode 9 "The Death Penalty"
- The Saint Season 5 Episode 2 "Interlude in Venice"
- The High Bright Sun (1965) - Alkis
- Thunderball (1965) - François Derval / Angelo Palazzi
- Where the Spies Are (1965) - Simmias
- That Riviera Touch (1966) - Le Pirate
- Sands of Beersheba (1966) - Salim
- The Magus (1968) - Meli
- You Can't Win 'Em All (1970) - Gunner major (uncredited)
- A Touch of the Other (1970) - Connelly
- Die Screaming, Marianne (1971) - Portuguese Police Detective
- Escape to Athena (1979) - Zeno's Man (final film role)
