= The Fellowship of the Frog =

1925 novel

- Author: Edgar Wallace
- Language: English
- Series: Inspector Elk
- Genre: Crime
- Publisher: Ward, Lock & Co.
- Publication date: 1925
- Publication place: United Kingdom
- Media type: Print
- Pages: 313
- ISBN: 1534913572
- Preceded by: The Nine Bears

The Fellowship of the Frog is a 1925 crime novel by the British writer Edgar Wallace. It was part of a series of books featuring the character Inspector Elk of Scotland Yard. In 1936 it was adapted into a West End play The Frog by Ian Hay, which inspired the subsequent films.

== Film adaptations ==
An American film serial Mark of the Frog was made in 1928.

In 1937 it was turned into a British film The Frog directed by Jack Raymond and starring Gordon Harker as Elk. Due to its popularity, it was followed by a sequel The Return of the Frog the next year.

In 1959 the West German film Der Frosch mit der Maske film was made, inspired by the novel. It commenced a lengthy series of Wallace adaptations made by Rialto Film made over the following decade.
