= The Three Just Men =

1925 novel by Edgar Wallace

- Author: Edgar Wallace
- Language: English
- Genre: Thriller
- Publication date: 1925
- Publication place: United Kingdom
- Media type: Print
- Preceded by: The Law of the Four Just Men
- Followed by: Again the Three

The Three Just Men is a 1925 thriller novel by the British writer Edgar Wallace. It is a part of a series of novels, sequels to The Four Just Men, featuring a group of vigilantes committed to fighting crime and wrongdoers by any means.

== Bibliography ==
- Hardy, Phil. The BFI Companion to Crime. A&C Black, 1997.
