= Jack O'Judgment =

1920 novel by Edgar Wallace

- Author: Edgar Wallace
- Language: English
- Genre: Thriller
- Publication date: 1920
- Publication place: United Kingdom
- Media type: Print
- Pages: 302
- ISBN: 1790400023

Jack O'Judgment is a 1920 thriller novel by the British writer Edgar Wallace. It features a vigilante who takes action against a gang of blackmailers, using a mysterious identity and leaving the Jack of Clubs as a calling card.

It is considered to be Wallace's best effort in this genre.
