= Death's Door (The Avengers) =

- The Avengers episode
- Episode no.: Season 5 Episode 18
- Directed by: Sidney Hayers
- Written by: Philip Levene (teleplay)
- Original air dates: 4 October 1967 (Grampian Television); 7 October 1967 (ABC Weekend TV)

Guest appearances
- Clifford Evans; Allan Cuthbertson; William Lucas; Marne Maitland

Episode chronology
← Previous "Return of the Cybernauts"	Next → "The £50,000 Breakfast"

"Death's Door" is the eighteenth episode of the fifth series of the 1960s cult British spy-fi television series The Avengers, starring Patrick Macnee and Diana Rigg, and guest starring Clifford Evans, Allan Cuthbertson, William Lucas, and Marne Maitland. It was first broadcast in the Grampian region of the ITV network on Wednesday 4 October 1967. ABC Weekend Television, who commissioned the show for ITV, broadcast it in its own regions three days later on Saturday 7 October. The episode was directed by Sidney Hayers, and written by Philip Levene.

== Plot ==
An important peace conference is being held in Britain in which the British delegate Sir Andrew Boyd is due to make a ground-breaking agreement for the future of international relations in Europe. Boyd arrives at the conference centre and is surrounded by crowds of photographers. Suddenly he begins acting strangely. In a disoriented way, he approaches the Conference room door and has a powerful premonition that he will be killed upon entering the door. He refuses to enter and rushes from the venue.

Steed and Peel visit him and tell him to get some rest. Later, Boyd rings Steed after he has slept and tells him to drive very carefully down the hill on the way to visit him. On the way the brakes of the car Steed and Peel are in fail and they crash safely in the woods. Whilst Peel has the car attended to, Steed makes his way to Boyd where he demands an explanation for how Boyd knew he was going to crash. Boyd implies he thinks he is becoming psychic. The following day on the way to the conference, Boyd begins predicting events, from the button missing on the coat of the butler, and mentioning that he will see a lion before his death. Arriving at the rescheduled conference, Boyd again becomes disoriented but flees this time even before he enters the building and in doing so is killed by a passing car. The last thing he sees is a lion's head sculpture on the wall of the path approaching the building.

Boyd is replaced by the younger Lord Melford who promises none of the nonsense that has just occurred. However, that night he has a nightmare, including seeing 12 o'clock on a clock, his bathroom cabinet collapsing, a Friday the 13th calendar, a cut on the face of an associate, a broken-down elevator, men dropping a box when getting out of a truck, a cyclist being run down by his car, a handle coming off the briefcase, seeing a sinister-looking foreigner before the Conference door, and finally seeing a large chandelier falling upon his head, killing him. The following day, every turn of events in his dream starts to come true to the point that as he approaches the conference room door and, like Boyd, he refuses to enter and leaves. He experiences a similar dream the following night and informs Steed and is so certain of his premonition that he will not attend the conference.

Steed and Peel investigate by following the journey that Melford would have taken and they find events in his second dream such as the "sound of machine guns" (men drilling) and being splashed by a puddle from a passing car at the very time Melford would have approached the conference. Finally Steed is curious to find out who the sinister-looking man is in his dream; Melford identifies him as Albert Becker, a representative for the eastern bloc, and gives him his address.

Steed visits Becker and finds him practicing his rifle shooting, with deadly aim. When he asks Steed to set up new targets, he begins shooting at Steed who hides behind the shooting target area and lodges a bullet in one of the holes and fires it with a stone and stick, killing his attacker as he approaches. He finds the address of a warehouse in Becker's jacket.

Peel meanwhile investigates the broken down elevator and finds it has been tampered with and traces it, subduing the culprit and finding a tag with the same warehouse address. Peel arrives at the warehouse first and discovers that all of the items experienced in the delegates dreams are in fact reality and discovers that the warehouse contains nothing but props seen in the dreams, including a mock conference room and door. It appears that the delegates were drugged and brought to the warehouse in their sleep and programmed to scare them away from the conference by the perpetrators to delay it for political reasons.

Peel and Steed bring Lord Melford to the warehouse. As they contemplate the situation, they realize that the associate with the plaster over the cut on his face must be in on the act. They meet him just as he is leaving the abandoned conference. A struggle ensues and the chandelier in the room is weakened by a stray gunshot during the fight; ironically, the chandelier falls and kills the man who had dreamed up the scheme.

== Cast ==
- Patrick Macnee as John Steed
- Diana Rigg as Emma Peel
- Clifford Evans as Sir Andrew Boyd
- Allan Cuthbertson as Lord George Melford
- William Lucas as Stapley
- Marne Maitland as Albert Becker
- Paul Dawkins as Dr. Evans
- Michel Faure as Pavret
- Peter Thomas as Saunders
- William Lyon Brown as Dalby
- Terry Yorke as Haynes
- Terence Maidment as Jepson

== Production ==
Filming for the episode was completed on 7 June 1967 and it was first broadcast in the Grampian region of the ITV network on Wednesday 4 October 1967. ABC Weekend Television, who commissioned the show for ITV, broadcast it in its own regions three days later on Saturday 7 October. The episode was produced by Albert Fennell and Brian Clemens and Executive Producer Julian Wintle, and the production set was designed by Robert Jones. The conference center featured in the episode was shot at the Royal Masonic Senior School.

== Reception ==
The episode is strongly based around the concept of surrealism. In fact, Tom Soter believes that the dreams were inspired by the Salvador Dalí sequence in Alfred Hitchcock's Spellbound (1945). The Avengers Forever! website acknowledged that a number of people do not rate the episode very highly, but remarked that "it is a very clever story, with some great twists and a nice little nail-biter in the middle. If I was forced to make gripe, it would be the lack of a real diabolical mastermind; but the especially effective nightmare-perspective scenes, populated by spooky "faceless dream men," more than make up for that."
