= Double Dan (novel) =

1924 crime novel by the British writer Edgar Wallace

- Author: Edgar Wallace
- Language: English
- Genre: Crime
- Publisher: Hodder & Stoughton
- Publication date: 1924
- Publication place: United Kingdom
- Media type: Print

Double Dan is a 1924 crime novel by the British writer Edgar Wallace. It was published in the United States as Diana of Kara Kara.

In 1927 it was adapted into a stage play of the same name by Wallace, which was poorly received by critics and closed after nine performances at London's Savoy Theatre.

== Bibliography ==
- Kiddle, Charles. A guide to the first editions of Edgar Wallace. Ivory Head Press, 1981.
