= Bernard Gribble =

British film editor

- Born: Bernard J. Gribble; 15 May 1927; Newhaven, East Sussex, England, UK
- Died: 15 September 2004 (aged 77); Los Angeles, California, USA
- Occupation: Film editor
- Years active: 1945 – 2003

Bernard Gribble (15 May 1927 – 15 September 2004) was a British film editor who, between 1948 and 2003, worked on nearly a hundred theatrical and made-for-TV films.

Gribble was nominated for ACE Eddie Awards for the editing of two episodes of the television miniseries Ellis Island (1984), and he had been nominated for an Emmy for the television miniseries The Winds of War (1983).

A founding member of the Guild of British Film and Television Editors, Gribble had been elected to membership in the American Cinema Editors after he moved to Hollywood to work.

== Selected filmography (features) ==
- Another Shore (1948) - Gribble's first credit as editor.
- The Man in the White Suit (1951)
- Clue of the Twisted Candle (1960)
- Marriage of Convenience (1960)
- Man at the Carlton Tower (1961)
- The Jokers (1967)
- Can Heironymus Merkin Ever Forget Mercy Humppe and Find True Happiness? (1969)
- The Games (1970)
- Death Wish (1974)
- Silver Bears (1978)
- Motel Hell (1980)
- Top Secret! (1984)
- Blind Obsession (2001) - Gribble's last feature film credit.
