= The Just Men of Cordova =

1917 novel by Edgar Wallace

- 1930 edition
- Author: Edgar Wallace
- Language: English
- Genre: Thriller
- Publisher: Ward Lock
- Publication date: 1917
- Publication place: United Kingdom
- Media type: Print
- Preceded by: The Council of Justice
- Followed by: The Law of the Four Just Men

The Just Men of Cordova is a 1917 thriller novel by the British writer Edgar Wallace.

It is the third entry in a series that began with The Four Just Men in 1905 about a group of vigilantes battling against crime. The collection includes the completed version of “The Poisoners” a story first printed in the May 1912 issue of The Novel Magazine without an ending, but with a prize offered to the first reader who submitted the correct ending.

== Synopsis ==
Three friends, Poiccart, Manfred and Gonsalez, enjoying the Spanish city of Cordova with its heat and Moorish influences, but they are still committed to employing their intellect and cunning to dispense justice.
