= Double Dan (play) =

1927 play

- Written by: Edgar Wallace
- Original language: English
- Genre: Comedy

Premiere
- Date premiered: 4 April 1927
- Place premiered: Opera House Theatre, Blackpool

Double Dan is a 1927 comedy crime play by the British writer Edgar Wallace. It is inspired by the 1924 novel Double Dan by Wallace. The plot concerns high finance and a criminal who is a master of disguise.

It ran for nine performances at the Savoy Theatre in the West End having premiered at the Opera House Theatre in Blackpool. The cast included Alfred Drayton, Peter Haddon, Reginald Bach and Josephine Wilson.

== Bibliography ==
- Wearing, J. P. The London Stage 1920-1929: A Calendar of Productions, Performers, and Personnel. Rowman & Littlefield, 2014.
