= Docklands =

Dockland or Docklands are areas occupied by, or in the neighbourhood of maritime docks, sometimes described as a Sailortown (dockland). The term is more common in Britain and the British Commonwealth.

Specifically the term may refer to:

- Aarhus Docklands, Denmark
- Buenos Aires Docklands, Argentina
- Dockland (Hamburg), a distinctive office building on the Elbe in Hamburg 's Altona-Altstadt district
- Docklands, Victoria, Melbourne, Australia
  - Docklands Stadium, a stadium in the Docklands area, currently known as Marvel Stadium
  - Docklands Studios Melbourne, a film and television production facility
- Dublin Docklands, Dublin, Ireland
- Eastern Docklands, Amsterdam, Netherlands
- London Docklands, London, England
