= Allan Davis (director) =

British-Australian actor, director and producer (1913–2001)

Allan George Davis (13 August 1913 – 10 January 2001) was an Anglo-Australian actor, director for film and theatre, and producer for film and television.

== Biography ==
Davis was born in London to Australian parents of Welsh descent. His father Leslie was on a business visit to London with his new wife Daisy. Six months later they returned to Sydney on the maiden voyage of the Orsova in 1914.

Davis grew up in Sydney's eastern suburbs, studying at Cranbrook School and the University of Sydney where he studied economics. He became interested in drama at school and performed in plays at University. In 1933 Davis made his first professional appearance in a film, The Squatter's Daughter. He also begins appearing in plays at the Independent Theatre in North Sydney.

In 1934, he moved to London, where he furthered his acting career. He was assistant manager for some Cochran shows. In London he sung and ance in a revue for Andre Charlot at the Comedy Theatre.

He joined the opening season of the York Citizens' Repertory Theatre in 1935 as an actor-stage manager. He stage-managed West End shows and moved from acting to directing.

During World War II he served in the British Army, rising to the rank of captain and seeing action in Italy, Greece, and Austria. In 1946 he became a director at the Bexhill Repertory. Then he was director of the Bristol Old Vic from 1949-1950.

In 1950 he undertook a lecture tour of American university theatres for the Rockefeller Foundation. During this time, he was hired to direct the period epic Rogue's March for MGM, his only major American film; the film was released in 1953, featuring climactic battle footage shot at the real Khyber Pass by Geoffrey Barkas in 1935.

Davis was a director and producer in London West End theatres from 1954 on but returned to Australia in the 1960s to tour for J.C. Williamson's.

He directed No sex please, we're British for 16 years, from 1971 to 1987. His production company was also involved in film and television production from the 1970s on before closing down in the early 1990s.

Davis died in London in 2001.

== Select filmography ==
- Chevron Theatre (1953) (TV series) - director
- Rogue's March (1953) - director
- Your Play Time (1953) (TV series) - director
- The Pepsi-Cola Playhouse (1954) - director
- Rheingold Theatre (1954) (TV series) - director
- O.S.S. (1957–58) (TV series) - director
- Theatre Night (1958–59) (TV series) - director
- Clue of the Twisted Candle (1960) - director
- The Edgar Wallace Mystery Theatre (1960–61) - director
- The Square Mile Murder (1961) (short) - director
- Wings of Death (1961) (short) - director
- Clue of the New Pin (1961) - director
- Rendezvous (1961) (TV series) - director
- The Fourth Square (1961) - director
- Love Among the Ruins (1975) (TV movie) - producer

== Select Theatre Credits ==
- The Marquiese by Noel Coward (1934) - Independent Theatre, Sydney
- Someone Waiting (1956) - Broadway - director
- Breath of Spring (1958) - director
- Spring and Port Wine (1965) by Bill Naughton - Mermaid Theare - director
- Keep It in the Family (1967) - Broadway - director
- Spring and Port Wine (1968) - Australian tour - director
- Come as You Are (1969) by John Mortimer - London - director
- A Touch of Spring by Samuel Taylor (1975) - Comedy Theatre, London - with Hayley Mills, Francis Matthews, Leigh Lawson and Julian Fellowes - director
- No Sex Please We're British by Alistair Foot and Anthony Marriott (1971–83) - Garrick Theatre in London, England - director
- Straight and Narrow by Jimmy Chinn (1980s) - director

== Notes ==
- Papers of Allan Davis - MS Acc03.300, National Library of Australia.
