= Robert Tronson =

English television director (1924–2008)

- Born: 18 May 1924; Chilmark, Wiltshire, England
- Died: 27 November 2008 (aged 84); London, England
- Occupation: Film director
- Children: Iestyn Tronson

Robert Tronson (18 May 1924 – 27 November 2008) was an English film and television director, born in Chilmark, Wiltshire. Educated at Churcher's College in Hampshire, followed by the Royal Naval College, Dartmouth, he served with the Royal Navy from 1941. After leaving the service at the end of the Second World War he determined to become a writer, but soon joined the BBC, where he produced children's television programmes. In 1955 he joined Associated-Rediffusion, and by the end of the decade he was working on television drama serials. From the 1960s onwards he worked as a freelance director in a career spanning almost 50 years. His final television credits were for directing five episodes of Hetty Wainthropp Investigates for the BBC, between 1996 and 1998.

In 1965 Tronson married Nona Richards (died 1987). He died on 27 November 2008 and was survived by their son.

== Filmography ==
=== Films (as director) ===
- Never Back Losers (1961)
- Man at the Carlton Tower (1961)
- Man Detained (1961)
- The Traitors (1962)
- Number Six (1962)
- On the Run (1963)
- Farewell Performance (1963)
- Ring of Spies (1964)
- Act of Reprisal (1964) – co-director

=== Television ===
- At Your Service, Ltd., seven episodes written with Hazel Adair (1951)
- Happy Holidays (1954)
- Man in a Suitcase (1967–1968)
- The Avengers
- The Saint
- Public Enemy
- Callan
- The Baron
- Randall and Hopkirk Deceased
- The Five Red Herrings (A four-part BBC adaptation, in 1975, of the Lord Peter Wimsey story)
- Armchair Thriller
- Boon
- Dempsey and Makepeace
- Bergerac
- Rumpole of the Bailey
- Under the Hammer
- Hetty Wainthropp Investigates (1996–1998)
- All Creatures Great and Small
- The Darling Buds of May

== Legacy ==
"I was very fond of Bob Tronson, who directed [the All Creatures Great and Small episode] 'Choose a Bright Morning' and many of our stories", recalled Robert Hardy in 2016. "I loved him, we got on very well. He was inventive and he gave me free rein."
