= Edgar Wallace =

British writer (1875–1932)

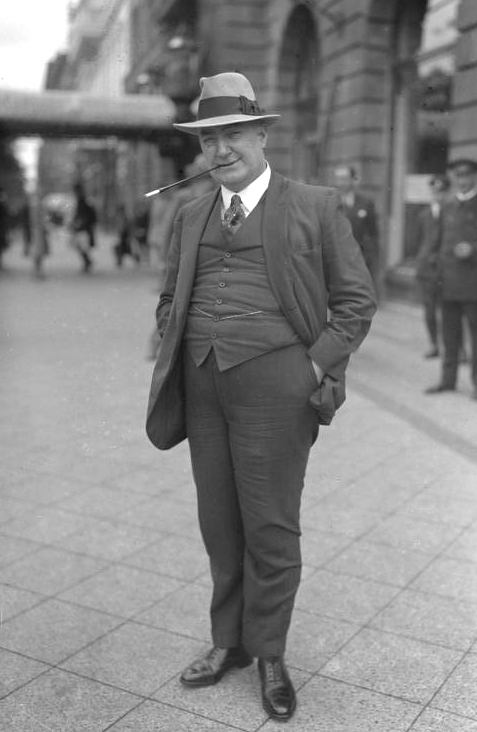
- Wallace in 1928
- Born: Richard Horatio Edgar Wallace; 1 April 1875; Greenwich, Kent, England
- Died: 10 February 1932 (aged 56); Beverly Hills, California, U.S.
- Occupations: Crime writer, war correspondent, journalist, novelist, screenwriter, and playwright
- Known for: Co-writer of King Kong
- Spouses: Ivy Maude Caldecott (m. 1901; div. 1918) Ethel Violet King (m. 1921)

Richard Horatio Edgar Wallace (1 April 1875 – 10 February 1932) was a British writer of crime and adventure fiction.

Born into poverty as an illegitimate London child, Wallace left school at the age of 12. He joined the army at age 21 and was a war correspondent during the Second Boer War for Reuters and the Daily Mail. Struggling with debt, he left South Africa, returned to London and began writing thrillers to raise income, publishing books including The Four Just Men (1905). Drawing on his time as a reporter in the Congo, covering the Belgian atrocities, Wallace serialised short stories in magazines such as The Windsor Magazine and later published collections such as Sanders of the River (1911). He signed with Hodder & Stoughton in 1921 and became an internationally recognised author.

After an unsuccessful bid to stand as Liberal MP for Blackpool (as one of David Lloyd George's Independent Liberals) in the 1931 general election, Wallace moved to Hollywood, where he worked as a script writer for RKO. He died suddenly from undiagnosed diabetes, during the initial drafting of King Kong (1933).

Wallace was such a prolific writer that one of his publishers claimed that a quarter of all books in England were written by him. As well as journalism, Wallace wrote screen plays, poetry, historical non-fiction, 18 stage plays, 957 short stories and over 170 novels, 12 in 1929 alone. More than 160 films have been made of Wallace's work.

In addition to his work on King Kong, he is remembered as a writer of "the colonial imagination", for the J. G. Reeder detective stories, and for the Green Archer serial. He sold over 50 million copies of his combined works in various editions and The Economist in 1997 describes him as "one of the most prolific thriller writers of [the 20th] century". Although the great majority of his books are out of print in the UK, they are very popular in Germany, with around 50 of his titles still in print. A 50-minute German TV documentary was made in 1963 called The Edgar Wallace Story, which featured his son Bryan Edgar Wallace.

== Life and work ==
=== Ancestry and birth ===
Wallace's great-grandfather was entertainer James Henry Marriott, and his grandmother was actress Alice Marriott. Wallace was born at 7 Ashburnham Grove, Greenwich, to actors Richard Horatio Marriott Edgar (1847–1894) and Mary Jane "Polly" Richards, née Blair (born 1843).

Wallace's mother's family had been in show business, and she worked in the theatre as a stagehand, usherette, and bit-part actress until she married in 1867. Her husband, Captain Joseph Richards, was born in 1838; he was from an Irish family. He and his father John Richards were both Merchant Navy captains, and his mother Catherine Richards came from a mariner family. Joseph died at sea in 1868, leaving his pregnant wife destitute. After the birth of Wallace's older sibling, his mother returned to the stage, assuming the stage name "Polly" Richards. In 1872, she met and joined the Marriott family theatre troupe, managed by Alice Marriott, her husband Richard Edgar, and her three adult children (from earlier liaisons), Grace, Adeline and Richard Horatio Marriott Edgar.

Wallace's parents had a "broom cupboard" style sexual encounter during an after-show party. Discovering she was pregnant, his mother invented a fictitious obligation in Greenwich that would last at least half a year and obtained a room in a boarding house where she lived until her son's birth, on 1 April 1875. During her confinement she had asked her midwife to find a couple to foster the child. The midwife introduced Wallace's mother to her close friend, Mrs Freeman, a mother of ten children, whose husband George Freeman was a Billingsgate fishmonger. On 9 April 1875, his mother took Wallace to the semi-literate Freeman family, and made arrangements to visit often.

=== Childhood and early career ===
Wallace, then known as Richard Horatio Edgar Freeman, had a happy childhood and a close bond with 20-year-old Clara Freeman, who became a second mother to him. By 1878, his mother could no longer afford the small sum she had been paying the Freemans to care for her son and, instead of placing the boy in the workhouse, the Freemans adopted him. His mother never visited Wallace again as a child. His foster-father George Freeman was determined to ensure Richard received a good education, and for some time Wallace attended St. Alfege with St. Peter's, a boarding school in Peckham, but he played truant and then left full-time education at the age of 12.

By his early teens, Wallace had held down numerous jobs such as newspaper-seller at Ludgate Circus near Fleet Street, milk-delivery boy, rubber factory worker, shoe shop assistant, and ship's cook. A plaque at Ludgate Circus commemorates Wallace's first encounter with the newspaper business. He was dismissed from his job on the milk run for stealing money. In 1894, he became engaged to a local Deptford girl, Edith Anstree, but broke the engagement and enlisted in the infantry.

Wallace registered in the British Army under the name Edgar Wallace, after the author of Ben-Hur, Lew Wallace. At the time the medical records register him as having a 33-inch chest and being stunted from his childhood spent in the slums. He was posted to South Africa with the West Kent Regiment, in 1896. He disliked army life but managed to arrange a transfer to the Royal Army Medical Corps, which was less arduous but more unpleasant, and so transferred again to the Press Corps, which he found suited him better.

=== 1898–1918 ===
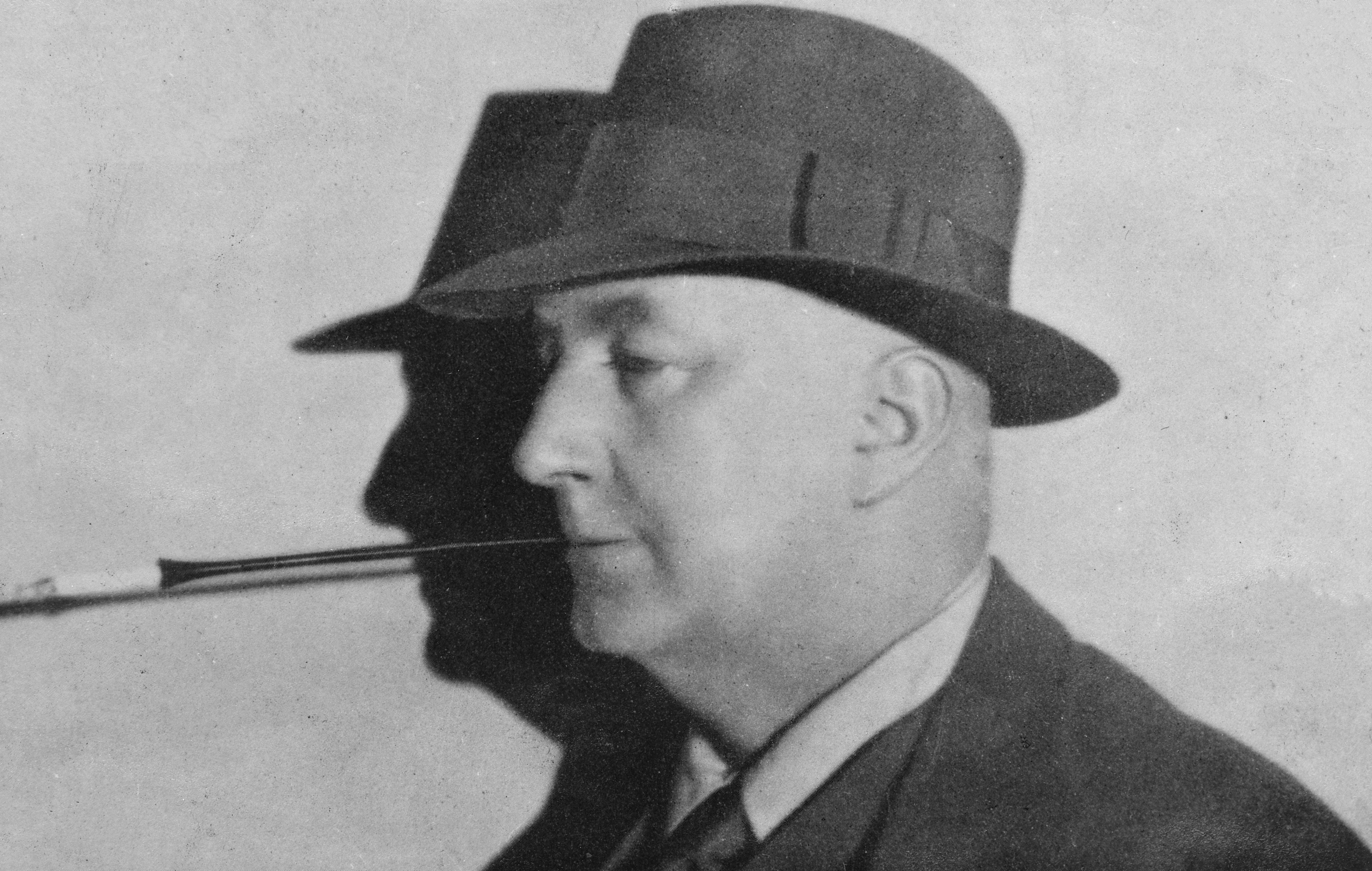
Edgar Wallace

Wallace began publishing songs and poetry, much inspired by Rudyard Kipling, whom he met in Cape Town in 1898. Wallace's first book of ballads, The Mission that Failed!, was published that same year. In 1899, he bought his way out of the forces and turned to writing full time. Remaining in Africa, he became a war correspondent, first for Reuters and then the Daily Mail (1900) and other periodicals during the Boer War.

In 1901, while in South Africa, Wallace married Ivy Maude Caldecott (1879–1926), even though her father Reverend William Shaw Caldecott, a Wesleyan missionary, was strongly opposed to the marriage. The couple's first child, Eleanor Clare Hellier Wallace, died suddenly from meningitis in 1903, and the couple returned to London soon afterwards, deeply in debt.

In London, Wallace worked for the Mail and began writing detective stories in a bid to earn quick money. A son, Bryan Edgar Wallace, was born in 1904 followed by a daughter, Patricia, in 1908. In 1903, Wallace met his birth mother Polly, whom he had never known. Terminally ill, 60 years old, and living in poverty, she came to him to ask for money and was turned away. Polly died in the Bradford Infirmary later that year.

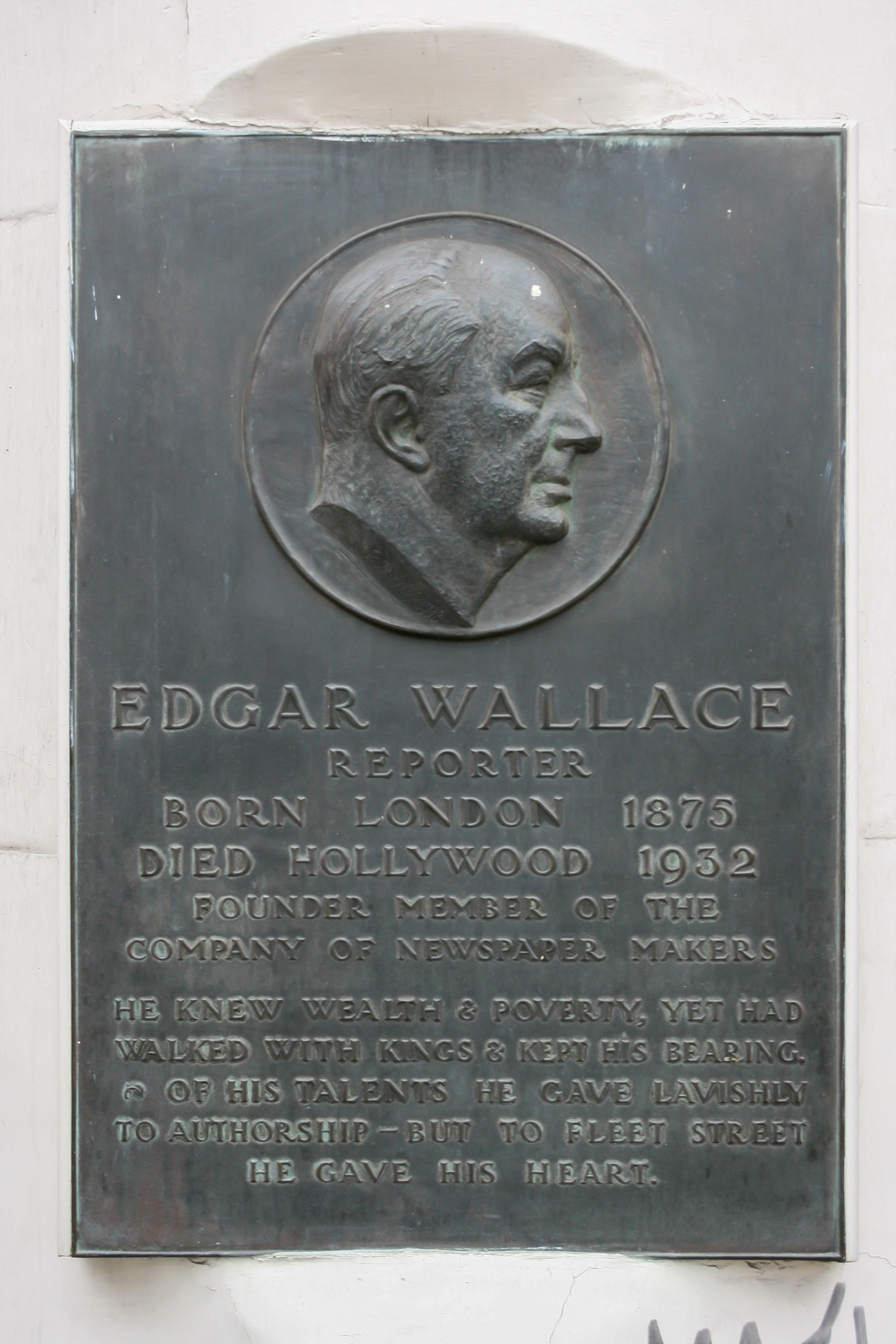
Plaque in Fleet Street, London, commemorating Edgar Wallace who worked there for the Daily Mail before finding fame as an author.

Unable to find any backer for his first book, Wallace set up his own publishing company, Tallis Press, which issued the sensational thriller The Four Just Men (1905). Despite promotion in the Mail and good sales, the project was financially mismanaged, and Wallace had to be bailed out by the Mail's proprietor Alfred Harmsworth, who was anxious that the farrago might reflect badly on his newspaper. Problems were compounded when inaccuracies in Wallace's reporting led to libel suits being brought against the Mail. Wallace was fired in 1907, the first reporter ever to be fired from the paper, and he found no other paper would employ him, given his reputation. The family lived continuously in a state of near-bankruptcy, Ivy having to sell her jewellery for food.

During 1907, Edgar travelled to the Congo Free State, to report on atrocities committed against the Congolese under King Leopold II of Belgium and the Belgian rubber companies, in which up to 15 million Congolese were killed. Isabel Thorne, of the Weekly Tale-Teller penny magazine, invited Wallace to serialise stories inspired by his experiences. These were published as his first collection Sanders of the River (1911), a best seller. Later, in 1935 it was adapted into a film of the same name, starring Paul Robeson. Wallace went on to publish 11 more similar collections (102 stories). They were tales of exotic adventure and local tribal rites, set on an African river, mostly without love interest as this held no appeal for Wallace. His first 28 books and their film rights he sold outright, with no royalties, for quick money. Critic David Pringle noted in 1987: "The Sanders Books are not frequently reprinted nowadays, perhaps because of their overt racism".

The period from 1908 to 1932 was the most prolific of Wallace's life. Initially, he wrote mainly in order to satisfy creditors in the UK and South Africa. However, his books' success began to rehabilitate his reputation as a journalist, and he began reporting from horse racing circles. He wrote for the Week-End and the Evening News, became an editor for Week-End Racing Supplement, started his own racing papers Bibury's and R. E. Walton's Weekly, and bought many racehorses of his own. He lost many thousands gambling, and despite his success, spent large sums on an extravagant lifestyle he could not afford.

On the outbreak of World War I, he was appointed military correspondent of the Birmingham Daily Post, for whom he wrote, by his own estimate, one-and-a-half-million words by the war's end.

In 1916, Ivy had her third and last child by Edgar, Michael Blair Wallace, and filed for divorce in 1918.

=== 1918–1929 ===
Ivy moved to Tunbridge Wells with the children, and Wallace drew closer to his secretary Ethel Violet King (1896–1933), daughter of banker Frederick King. They married in 1921; their daughter Margaret Penelope June (known as Penny Wallace) was born in 1923.

Wallace began to take his fiction writing career more seriously and signed with publishers Hodder and Stoughton in 1921, organising his contracts, instead of selling rights to his work piecemeal in order to raise funds. This allowed him advances, royalties, and full scale promotional campaigns for his books, which he had never before had. The publisher aggressively advertised him as a celebrity writer, "King of Thrillers", known for this trademark trilby, cigarette holder, and yellow Rolls-Royce. He was said to be able to write a 70,000 word novel in three days and plough through three novels at once, and the publishers agreed to publish everything he wrote as fast as he could write them. In 1928, it was estimated that one in four books being read in the UK had come from Wallace's pen. He wrote across many genres including science fiction, screen plays, and a non-fiction ten-volume history of the First World War. All told, he wrote over 170 novels, 18 stage plays, and 957 short stories, and his works were translated into 28 languages. The critic Wheeler Winston Dixon suggests that Wallace became somewhat of a public joke for this prodigious output.

Wallace served as chairman of the Press Club, which continues to present an annual Edgar Wallace Award for excellence in writing. Following the great success of his novel The Ringer, Wallace was appointed chairman of the British Lion Film Corporation in return for giving British Lion first option on all his output. Wallace's contract gave him an annual salary, a substantial block of stock in the company, a large stipend from everything British Lion produced based on his work, plus 10% of British Lion's overall annual profits. Additionally, British Lion employed his elder son, Bryan E. Wallace, as a film editor. By 1929, Wallace's earnings were almost £50,000 per annum (equivalent to about £2 million in current terms). He also invented at this time the Luncheon Club, bringing together his two greatest loves: journalism and horse-racing.

=== Firsts ===
Wallace was the first British crime novelist to use policemen as his protagonists, rather than amateur sleuths as most other writers of the time did. Most of his novels are independent stand-alone stories; he seldom used series heroes, and when he did he avoided a strict story order, so that continuity was not required from book to book.

On 6 June 1923, Edgar Wallace became the first British radio sports reporter, when he made a report on The Derby for the British Broadcasting Company, the newly founded predecessor of the BBC.

=== Ivy's death ===
Wallace's ex-wife Ivy was diagnosed with breast cancer in 1923, and though the tumour was successfully removed, it returned terminally by 1925, and she died in 1926.

=== "The Canker In Our Midst" ===
Wallace wrote a controversial article in the Daily Mail in 1926 entitled "The Canker In Our Midst" about paedophilia and the show business world. Describing how some show business people unwittingly leave their children vulnerable to predators, it linked paedophilia with homosexuality and outraged many of his colleagues, publishing associates, and business friends including theatre mogul Gerald du Maurier. Biographer Margaret Lane describes it as an "intolerant, blustering, kick-the-blighters-down-the-stairs" type of essay, even by the standards of the day.

=== Politics, emigration to the U.S., and screenwriting ===
Wallace became active in the Liberal Party and contested Blackpool in the 1931 general election as one of a handful of Independent Liberals, who rejected the National Government, and the official Liberal support for it, and strongly supported free trade. He also bought the Sunday News, edited it for six months, and wrote a theatre column, before it closed. In the event, he lost the election by over 33,000 votes. He went to America, burdened by debt, in November 1931. Around the same time, he wrote the screenplay for the first sound film adaptation of The Hound of the Baskervilles (1932), produced in England by Gainsborough Pictures.

He moved to Hollywood and began working as a "script doctor" for RKO. His later play, The Green Pack, opened to excellent reviews, boosting his status even further. Wallace wanted to get his own work on Hollywood celluloid, and so he adapted books such as The Four Just Men and Mr J G Reeder. In Hollywood, Wallace met Stanley Holloway's scriptwriter, Wallace's own half-brother Marriott Edgar. Wallace's play On the Spot, written about gangster Al Capone, would prove to be the writer's greatest theatrical success. It was described by Jack Adrian as "arguably, in construction, dialogue, action, plot and resolution, still one of the finest and purest of 20th-century melodramas". It launched the career of Charles Laughton, who played the lead Capone character Tony Perelli.

== Death and aftermath ==
=== Death ===
In December 1931, Wallace was assigned work on the RKO "gorilla picture" (King Kong, 1933) for producer Merian C. Cooper. By late January, however, he was beginning to suffer sudden, severe headaches and was diagnosed with diabetes. His condition deteriorated within days. Violet booked passage to California on a liner out of Southampton, but received word that Edgar had slipped into a coma and died of the disease, combined with double pneumonia, on 10 February 1932 in North Maple Drive, Beverly Hills. The flags on Fleet Street's newspaper offices flew at half-mast, and the bell of St. Bride's tolled in mourning. His body was returned to England and he was buried at Little Marlow Cemetery, Fern Lane, Buckinghamshire, not far from his UK country home, Chalklands, in Bourne End.

=== Aftermath ===
Despite his later success, Wallace had amassed massive debts, some still remaining from his years in South Africa, many to racing bookies. The large royalties from his greatly popular works allowed the estate to be settled within two years.

Violet Wallace outlived her husband by only 14 months. She died suddenly in April 1933, aged about 37, while the estate was still deep in debt.

== Legacy ==
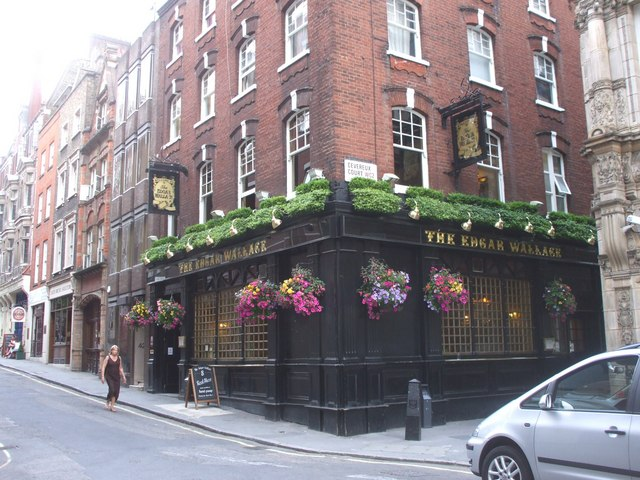
The Edgar Wallace pub, Essex Street, off Strand, London

Violet Wallace's own will left her share of the Wallace estate to her daughter Penelope (1923–1997), herself an author of mystery and crime novels, who became the chief benefactor and shareholder. Penelope married George Halcrow in 1955. The couple ran the Wallace estate, managing her father's literary legacy and starting the Edgar Wallace Society in 1969. The work is continued by Penelope's daughter, also named Penelope. The Society has members in 20 countries. The literary body is currently managed by the London agency A.P. Watt.

Wallace's eldest son Bryan Edgar Wallace (1904–1971) was also an author of mystery and crime novels. In 1934, Bryan married Margaret Lane (1907–94), also a writer. Lane's biography of Edgar Wallace was published in 1938

The Edgar Wallace Mystery Magazine was a monthly digest-size fiction magazine specializing in crime and detective fiction. It published 35 issues from 1964 to 1967. Each issue contained original works of short crime or mystery fiction as well as reprints by authors like Wallace, Chekhov, Steinbeck, and Agatha Christie.

More than 160 films and several radio adaptations have been made based on Wallace's work. Wallace also has a pub named after him in Essex Street, off The Strand in London.

A blue plaque commemorating Wallace was erected in 1960 by the London County Council at 6 Tressillian Crescent in Lewisham, London, England where he once lived.

== Writing ==
=== Method ===
Wallace narrated his words onto wax cylinders (the dictaphones of the day) and his secretaries typed up the text. This may be why he was able to work at such high speed and why his stories have narrative drive. Many of Wallace's successful books were dictated like this over two or three days, locked away with cartons of cigarettes and endless pots of sweet tea, often working pretty much uninterrupted in 72 hours. Most of his novels were serialised in segments but written in this way. The serialised stories that were instead written piecemeal have a distinctly different narrative energy, not sweeping up the reader on the story wave.

Wallace rarely edited his own work after it was dictated and typed up, but sent it straight to the publishers, intensely disliking the revision of his work with other editors. The company would do only cursory checks for factual errors before printing.

Wallace faced widespread accusations that he used ghost writers to churn out books, though there is no evidence of this, and his prolificness became something of a joke, the subject of cartoons and sketches. His "three day books", reeled off to keep the loan sharks from the door, were unlikely to garner great critical praise and Wallace claimed not to find literary value in his own works.

=== Themes and critique ===
Selling over 50 million copies of his works, including 170 novels, Wallace was very much a populist writer, and was dismissed by the literati as such. Q. D. Leavis, Arnold Bennett and Dorothy L. Sayers led the attack on Wallace, suggesting he offered no social critique or subversive agenda at all and distracted the reading public from better things. Trotsky, reading a Wallace novel whilst recuperating on his sickbed in 1935, found it to be "mediocre, contemptible and crude ... [with no] shade of perception, talent or imagination." Critics Steinbrunner and Penzler stated that Wallace's writing is "slapdash and cliché-ridden, [with] characterization that is two dimensional and situations [that] are frequently trite, relying on intuition, coincidence, and much pointless, confusing movement to convey a sense of action. The heroes and villains are clearly labelled, and stock characters, humorous servants, baffled policemen, breathless heroines, could be interchanged from one book to another." The Oxford Companion to the Theatre asserts, however, that "In all his works [Wallace] showed unusual precision of detail, narrative skill, and inside knowledge of police methods and criminal psychology, the fruits of his apprenticeship as a crime reporter".

George Orwell commented on Wallace in Raffles and Miss Blandish: "His own ideal was the detective-inspector who catches criminals not because he is intellectually brilliant but because he is part of an all-powerful organization. Hence the curious fact that in Wallace's most characteristic stories the ‘clue’ and the ‘deduction’ play no part. The criminal is always defeated by an incredible coincidence, or because in some unexplained manner the police know all about the crime beforehand. The tone of the stories makes it quite clear that Wallace's admiration for the police is pure bully-worship. A Scotland Yard detective is the most powerful kind of being that he can imagine, while the criminal figures in his mind as an outlaw against whom anything is permissible, like the condemned slaves in the Roman arena. His policemen behave much more brutally than British policemen do in real life — they hit people without provocation, fire revolvers past their ears to terrify them and so on — and some of the stories exhibit a fearful intellectual sadism. (For instance, Wallace likes to arrange things so that the villain is hanged on the same day as the heroine is married.)"

However, the use of plot formulae has been called into question by some. The critic Wheeler Winston Dixon maintains that Wallace covered a wide variety of perspectives and characterisations, exploring themes such as feminist self-determination (Barbara on her Own 1926, Four-Square Jane 1929, The Girl from Scotland Yard 1926), upsetting peerage hierarchies (Chick, 1923), science fiction (The Day of Uniting, 1926), schizophrenia (The Man Who Knew, 1919) and autobiography (People, 1926).

Wallace characters such as District Commissioner Sanders can be taken to represent the values of colonial white supremacy in Africa, and now are viewed by some as racist and paternalistic. His writing has been attacked by some for its conception of Africans as stupid children who need a firm hand. Sanders, for example, pledges to bring "civilisation" to "half a million cannibal folk". George Orwell called Wallace a "bully worshipper" and "proto-fascist", though many critics conceived Wallace more as a populist writer who wrote for the market of the time.

=== Science fiction ===
Edgar Wallace enjoyed writing science fiction but found little financial success in the genre despite several efforts. His constant need for income always brought him back to the more mundane styles of fiction that sold more easily. Planetoid 127, first published in 1924 but reprinted as late as 2011, is a short story about an Earth scientist who communicates via wireless with his counterpart on a duplicate Earth orbiting unseen because it is on the opposite side of the Sun. The idea of a "mirror Earth" or "mirror Universe" later became a standard subgenre within science fiction. The story also bears similarities to Rudyard Kipling's hard science fiction story "Wireless". Wallace's other science fiction works include The Green Rust, a story of bio-terrorists who threaten to release an agent that will destroy the world's corn crops, 1925, which accurately predicted that a short peace would be followed by a German attack on England, and The Black Grippe, about a disease that renders everyone in the world blind. His last work of science fiction and the only one widely remembered today is the screenplay for King Kong.

=== King Kong ===
The cover of the original 1932 screenplay for the film King Kong by Edgar Wallace entitled "Kong".

Out of the many scripts he penned for RKO, Merian C. Cooper's "gorilla picture" had the most lasting influence, becoming the classic King Kong (1933).

Wallace wrote the initial 110-page first draft for "The Beast" (the film's original title) over five weeks, from late December 1931 to January 1932. In all, there were three draft versions, another titled "Kong". Kong was rejected as the film's title because it was too similar to another Cooper film, Chang, released in 1927, and because it sounded Chinese. Wallace suggested the title King Ape. His diary described the writing process for this draft: Cooper fed aspects of the story in conferences and phone conversations; Wallace then executed Cooper's ideas, the latter approving the developing script on a sequence-by-sequence basis. While working on the project, Cooper also screened various recent films for Wallace to put him in the right mindset, including Dracula (1931) and Frankenstein (1931). One of Cooper's main aspirations with the story was to use as much footage of an abandoned RKO picture with a similar premise, Creation, as possible. He showed Wallace the fragments that were to be reused in the current script.

Although the draft was incomplete, Wallace only made minor revisions to it, each at Cooper's request. In late January, Wallace was hospitalized, and by 10 February, he was dead, leaving Cooper without a screenwriter. The fragmentary nature of Wallace's script meant that the main dialogue-free action of the film (the jungle sequences) would have to be shot first, both as insurance and as a showreel for the board of RKO.

In My Hollywood Diary, Edgar Wallace wrote about the reception of his screenplay: "Cooper called me up last night and told me that everybody who had read 'Kong' was enthusiastic. They say it is the best adventure story that has ever been written for the screen." Wallace had high expectations for the film: "I am certain that 'Kong' is going to be a wow."

His screenplay begins with Denham and the party at the island, called "Vapour Island" by Wallace because of the volcanic emissions. Ann Darrow is called Shirley Redman in this early version. Jack Driscoll is also referred to as John Lanson or Johnny, and Captain Englehorn is much more domineering. Danby G. Denham is a promoter and a P. T. Barnum type showman who is looking for a giant ape to bring back to Madison Square Garden or the Polo Grounds to exhibit as a sideshow. The movie retains the Barnum theme when Denham, who evolved into Carl Denham in the Rose and Creelman treatment, refers to Kong as "the eighth wonder of the world", echoing Barnum's style of hyping acts. Wallace created the major characters, their relationships, and their role in the overall plot. He also created the story's beauty and the beast theme.

In his original screenplay, the crew of the boat consists of escaped convicts who kidnap Shirley. After a dinosaur attacks and wrecks their boat, they find refuge on the island. In a tent, a convict tries to rape Shirley. Kong appears, rescues Shirley and takes her away to his cave. Wallace says in a notation on the script that Kong is 30 feet tall, thus establishing Kong as a giant ape. John and the remaining convicts then go after Shirley, using a log to cross a ravine. Kong attacks them which leads to their deaths as the log crashes down the ravine. Kong fights and kills a triceratops. Dinosaurs and pterodactyls attack Kong and the party. Kong takes Shirley to his hideout in the mountains, and Jack rescues her. Using gas bombs, the expedition knocks out Kong.

Kong is brought back to New York and put in a cage. Shirley is attacked by lions and tigers let loose on purpose by Senorita. Kong kills the cats and whisks Shirley away. He climbs the Empire State Building where airplanes shoot at him. Cooper sent Wallace an internal memo from RKO suggesting that John dissuade the police from shooting Kong because of the danger to Shirley: "Please see if you consider it practical to work out theme that John attempts single handed rescue on top of Empire State Building if police will let off shooting for a minute." Kong is finally killed when lightning strikes the flag pole he is hanging on to. Early publicity stills for the movie have the title as "Kong" and "by Edgar Wallace" and show a lightning storm and flashes of lightning as envisioned by Wallace.

In his version, a small ape peeling a rose prefigured Kong's peeling away Shirley's clothes. His treatment also included an underwater scene from the attacking dinosaur's point of view as it approached a capsized boat.

However, his 110-page script was merely the first rough draft, not a final and completed shooting script.

After Wallace's death, Ruth Rose was brought in to work on the document he had started. She happened to be Schoedsack's wife and was able to translate the expectations of the producers into the final script. She added the ritual scene on Skull Island to replace Wallace's original idea of the attempted rape of Ann Darrow. Rose also added the opening scenes of the movie in which the main characters and plot are introduced. James Ashmore Creelman, who worked on the screenplay for The Most Dangerous Game, a film that Wallace was in discussions to write for at the time of his death, was also brought in to tidy up the script. The job of Rose and Creelman was to rework Wallace's original screenplay and replace scenes that failed to translate as expected.

The original Wallace screenplay was published in the 2013 book Ray Harryhausen – The Master of the Majicks, Volume 1: Beginnings and Endings by Mike Hankin. In 2023, the original Wallace screenplay was published in KONG: An Original Screenplay by Edgar Wallace edited by Stephen Jones.

That original screenplay is analysed and discussed in The Girl in the Hairy Paw (1976), edited by Ronald Gottesman and Harry Geduld, and by Mark Cotta Vaz, in the preface to the Modern Library reissue of King Kong (2005).

In December 1932, Wallace's story and screenplay for King Kong were "novelised" or transcribed by Delos W. Lovelace, a journalist and author himself who knew Cooper from when they worked on a newspaper, and appeared in book form under the title King Kong. Lovelace based the transcription largely on the Ruth Rose and James A. Creelman screenplay. This "novelization" of King Kong, attributed to Wallace, Cooper, and Lovelace, was originally published by Grosset and Dunlap. The book was reissued in 2005 by the Modern Library, a division of Random House, with an introduction by Greg Bear and a preface by Mark Cotta Vaz, and by Penguin in the US. In the UK, Victor Gollancz published a hardcover version in 2005. The first paperback edition had been published by Bantam in 1965 in the US and by Corgi in 1966 in the UK. In 1976, Grosset and Dunlap republished the novel in paperback and hardcover editions. There were paperback editions by Tempo and by Futura that year as well. In 2005, Blackstone Audio released a spoken-word version of the book as an audiobook on CD with commentary by Ray Bradbury, Harlan Ellison, and Ray Harryhausen, among others. Harryhausen stated that he had read the original screenplay by Wallace. There were also German and Czech versions of the novel in 2005.

On 28 October 1933, Cinema Weekly published the short story "King Kong", credited to Edgar Wallace and Draycott Montagu Dell (1888–1940). Dell had known Wallace as both worked for British newspapers. This can be called a "story-ization" of the Wallace and Cooper story which relied on the Rose and Creelman screenplay, but which like the Wallace treatment, begins at the island. Both Wallace and Cooper had signed a contract which allowed them to develop the story in a book or short story or serial form. Walter F. Ripperger also wrote a two-part serialization of the Wallace and Cooper story in Mystery magazine titled "King Kong" in the February and March issues in 1933.

=== West Germany ===
In 1959 Danish production company Rialto Film on behalf of West German distributor Constantin Film made "The Fellowship of the Frog" into a movie. The initial success prompted Rialto Film to establish a German subsidiary, securing the rights to most of Wallace's novels, and producing an additional 38 movies until 1972. During the time Wallace's eldest son Bryan as well had 10 of his novels adapted into movies by West Berlin-based production company CCC-Filmkunst. Both series were set in contemporary UK but filmed entirely in Western Germany and West Berlin. Although panned by critics the movies garnered a following with occasional reruns on German TV.

In 2004, Oliver Kalkofe produced the movie Der Wixxer, an homage to the popular black and white Wallace movies. It featured many well known comedians. In 2007, Kalkofe produced a sequel Neues vom Wixxer.

There are more of Wallace's books still in print in Germany than elsewhere and his work has consistently remained popular there.

== Literary works ==
=== Sanders of the River series ===
- Sanders of the River (1911) - short stories published in The Weekly Tale-Teller, filmed in 1935
- The People of the River (1911) - short stories published in The Weekly Tale-Teller
- The River of Stars (1913) - full-length novel featuring a cameo appearance by Sanders.
- Bosambo of the River (1914) - short stories published in The Weekly Tale-Teller
- Bones (1915) - short stories published in The Weekly Tale-Teller
- The Keepers of the King's Peace (1917) - short stories published in The Windsor Magazine
- Lieutenant Bones (1918) - short stories published in The Windsor Magazine
- Bones in London (1921) - short stories published in The Windsor Magazine
- Sandi the Kingmaker (1922) - full-length novel serialised in The Windsor Magazine
- Bones of the River (1923) - short stories published in The 20-Story Magazine
- Sanders (1926) - short story collection
- Again Sanders (1928) - short story collection

The series was posthumously continued by Francis Gérard -

- The Return of Sanders of the River - short story collection (1938)
- The Law of the River - short story collection (1940)
- The Justice of Sanders - short story collection (1951)

=== Four Just Men series ===
- The Four Just Men (1905)
- The Council of Justice (1908)
- The Just Men of Cordova (1917)
- The Law of the Four Just Men (1921)
- The Three Just Men (1925)
- Again the Three (1928)

=== Mr. J. G. Reeder series ===
- Room 13 (1924)
- The Mind of Mr. J. G. Reeder (US title: The Murder Book of Mr. J. G. Reeder) (1925)
- Terror Keep (1927)
- Red Aces (1929)
- The Crook in Crimson (1929)
- The Guv'nor and Other Short Stories (US title: Mr. Reeder Returns) (1932)

=== Elk of Scotland Yard series ===
- The Nine Bears (1910) revised as Silinski – Master Criminal (1930)
- The Fellowship of the Frog (1925) adapted as The Frog, spawned a sequel Return of the Frog
- The Joker or The Colossus (1926)
- The Twister (1928)
- The India-Rubber Men (1929) adapted as The Return of the Frog
- White Face (1930)

=== Educated Evans series ===
- Educated Evans (1924)
- More Educated Evans (1926)
- Good Evans (1927)

=== Smithy series ===
- Smithy (1905)
- Smithy Abroad (1909)
- Smithy and The Hun (1915)
- Nobby or Smithy's Friend Nobby (1916)

=== Crime novels ===
- Angel Esquire (1908)
- The Fourth Plague (1913)
- Grey Timothy (1913)
- The Man Who Bought London (1915)
- The Melody of Death (1915)
- A Debt Discharged (1916)
- The Tomb of Ts'in (1916)
- The Secret House (1917)
- The Clue of the Twisted Candle (1918)
- Down Under Donovan (1918)
- The Man Who Knew (1918)
- The Strange Lapses of Larry Loman (1918) (short novelette)
- The Green Rust (1919)
- Kate Plus Ten (1919)
- The Daffodil Mystery (1920)
- Jack O'Judgment (1920)
- The Angel of Terror (1922)
- The Crimson Circle (1922)
- Mr. Justice Maxell (1922)
- The Valley of Ghosts (1922)
- Captains of Souls (1923)
- The Clue of the New Pin (1923)
- The Green Archer (1923)
- The Missing Million (1923)
- The Dark Eyes of London (expanded from The Croakers (1924))
- Double Dan (1924) a.k.a. Diana of Kara Kara
- The Face in the Night (1924)
- The Sinister Man (1924)
- The Three Oak Mystery (1924)
- The Avenger or The Hairy Arm (1925)
- The Blue Hand (1925)
- The Daughters of the Night (1925)
- The Gaunt Stranger or Police Work (1925)
  - revised as The Ringer (1926)
- A King by Night (1925)
- The Strange Countess (1925)
- The Black Abbot (1926)
- The Day of Uniting (1926)
- The Door with Seven Locks (1926)
- The Girl from Scotland Yard or The Square Emerald or The Woman (1926)
- The Man from Morocco or Souls In Shadows or The Black (US Title) (1926)
- The Million Dollar Story (1926)
- The Northing Tramp (1926)
- Penelope of the Polyantha (1926)
- The Terrible People or The Gallows' Hand (1926)
- We Shall See! (US title: The Gaol-Breakers) (1926)
- The Yellow Snake, a.k.a. The Black Tenth (1926)
- Big Foot (1927)
- The Feathered Serpent or Inspector Wade or Inspector Wade and the Feathered Serpent (1927)
- Flat 2 (1927)
- The Forger or The Counterfeiter (1927); published in the United States as The Clever One (1928)
- The Hand of Power or The Proud Sons of Ragusa (1927)
- The Man Who Was Nobody (1927)
- Number Six (1927)
- The Squeaker or The Sign of the Leopard (US title: The Squealer) (1927)
- The Traitor's Gate (1927)
- The Double (1928)
- The Flying Squad (1928)
- The Gunner (US title: Gunman's Bluff) (1928)
- Four Square Jane (1929)
- The Golden Hades or Stamped In Gold or The Sinister Yellow Sign (1929)
- The Green Ribbon (1929)
- The Calendar (1930)
- The Clue of the Silver Key or The Silver Key (1930)
- The Lady of Ascot (1930)
- The Devil Man or Sinister Street or Silver Steel or The Life and Death of Charles Peace (1931)
- The Man at the Carlton or The Mystery of Mary Grier (1931)
- The Coat of Arms or The Arranways Mystery (1931)
- On the Spot: Violence and Murder in Chicago (1931)
- When the Gangs Came to London or Scotland Yard's Yankee Dick or The Gangsters Come To London (1932)
- The Frightened Lady or The Case of the Frightened Lady or Criminal At Large (1933)
- The Green Pack (1933)
- The Man Who Changed His Name (1935)
- The Mouthpiece (1935)
- Smoky Cell (1935)
- The Table (1936)
- Sanctuary Island (1936)
- The Road to London (1986)

=== Other novels ===
- Captain Tatham of Tatham Island (1909)
- The Duke in the Suburbs (1909)
- Private Selby (1912)
- "1925" – The Story of a Fatal Peace (1915)
- Those Folk of Bulboro (1918)
- Tam o' the Scoots (1918)
- The Book of All Power (1921)
- The Flying Fifty-Five (1922)
- The Books of Bart (1923)
- Barbara on Her Own (1926)

=== Poetry collections ===
- The Mission That Failed (1898)
- War and Other Poems (1900)
- Writ In Barracks (1900)

=== Non-fiction ===
- Unofficial Despatches of the Anglo-Boer War (1901)
- Famous Scottish Regiments (1914)
- Field Marshal Sir John French (1914)
- Heroes All: Gallant Deeds of the War (1914)
- The Standard History of the War (1914)
- Kitchener's Army and the Territorial Forces: The Full Story of a Great Achievement (1915)
- Vol. 2–4. War of the Nations (1915)
- Vol. 5–7. War of the Nations (1916)
- Vol. 8–9. War of the Nations (1917)
- Famous Men and Battles of the British Empire (1917)
- The Real Shell-Man: The Story of Chetwynd of Chilwell (1919)
- People or Edgar Wallace by Himself (1926)
- The Trial of Patrick Herbert Mahon (1928)
- My Hollywood Diary (1932)

=== Plays ===
- An African Millionaire (1904)
- The Forest of Happy Dreams (1910)
- Dolly Cutting Herself (1911)
- The Manager's Dream (1914)
- M'Lady (1921)
- The Mystery of room 45 (1926)
- Double Dan (1927)
- A Perfect Gentleman (1927)
- The Terror (1927) based on the novel The Black Abbot
- Traitors Gate (1927)
- The Lad (1928)
- The Man Who Changed His Name (1928)
- The Squeaker (1928)
- The Calendar (1929)
- Persons Unknown (1929)
- The Ringer (1929)
- The Mouthpiece (1930)
- On the Spot (1930)
- Smoky Cell (1930)
- The Squeaker (1930)
- To Oblige A Lady (1930)
- The Case of the Frightened Lady (1931)
- The Old Man (1931)
- The Green Pack (1932)
- The Table (1932)

=== Screenplays ===
- The Valley of Ghosts (1928, British film)
- Mark of the Frog (1928, American film)
- Prince Gabby (1929, British film)
- The Squeaker (1930, British film)
- The Hound of the Baskervilles (1932, British film)
- King Kong (1932, 5 January 1932, first draft of original screenplay entitled "The Beast", 110 pages) While the script was not used in its entirety, much of it was retained for the final screenplay. Portions of the original Wallace screenplay were published in 1976. The complete original screenplay was published in 2013 in Ray Harryhausen – The Master of the Majicks, Vol. 1 by Archive Editions in Los Angeles. The Delos Lovelace transcription remains the official book-length treatment of the story.

=== Short story collections ===
- P.C. Lee (1909) Police Constable Lee; 24 short stories
- The Admirable Carfew (1914)
- The Adventures of Heine (1917)
- Tam O' the Scouts (1918)
- The Man Called McGinnice (1918)
- The Fighting Scouts (1919)
- The Black Grippe (1920)
- Chick (1923)
- Elegant Edward (1924)
- The Exploits of Airman Hay (1924)
- The Black Avons (1925)
- The Brigand (1927)
- The Mixer (1927)
- This England (1927)
- The Orator (1928)
- The Thief in the Night (1928)
- The Lone House Mystery and Other Stories (Collins and son, 1929)
- The Governor of Chi-Foo (1929)
- Again the Ringer The Ringer Returns (US Title) (1929)
- The Big Four or Crooks of Society (1929)
- The Black or Blackmailers I Have Foiled (1929)
- The Cat-Burglar (1929)
- Circumstantial Evidence (1929)
- Fighting Snub Reilly (1929)
- For Information Received (1929)
- Forty-Eight Short Stories (1929)
- Planetoid 127 and The Sweizer Pump (1929)
- The Ghost of Down Hill & The Queen of Sheba's Belt (1929)
- The Iron Grip (1929)
- The Lady of Little Hell (1929)
- The Little Green Man (1929)
- The Prison-Breakers (1929)
- The Reporter (1929)
- Killer Kay (1930)
- Mrs William Jones and Bill (1930)
- Forty Eight Short-Stories (George Newnes Limited ca. 1930)
- The Stretelli Case and Other Mystery Stories (1930)
- The Terror (1930)
- The Lady Called Nita (1930)
- Sergeant Sir Peter or Sergeant Dunn, C.I.D. (1932)
- The Scotland Yard Book of Edgar Wallace (1932)
- The Steward (1932)
- Nig-Nog And Other Humorous Stories (1934)
- The Last Adventure (1934)
- The Woman From the East (1934) – co-written with Robert George Curtis
- The Edgar Wallace Reader of Mystery and Adventure (1943)
- The Undisclosed Client (1963)
- The Man Who Married His Cook (White Lion, 1976)
- The Death Room: Strange and Startling Stories (1986)
- The Sooper and Others (1984)
- Stories collected in the Death Room (William Kimber, 1986)
- Winning Colours: The Selected Racing Writings of Edgar Wallace (1991)
- The Vampire of Wembley: and Other Tales of Murder, Mystery, and Mayhem (2023)

=== Other ===
- King Kong, with Draycott M. Dell, (1933 posthumously), 28 October 1933 Cinema Monthly

== Films based on works by Edgar Wallace ==
See also Edgar Wallace Mysteries
See also Bryan Edgar Wallace Filmography
