= 1924 in literature =

This article contains information about the literary events and publications of 1924.

== Events ==
Ralph Lynn (centre) with Cecilia Gold and Will Deming in the 1924 London production of It Pays to Advertise

- January
  - Writer Miguel de Unamuno is dismissed for the first time from his university posts by the Spanish dictator General Miguel Primo de Rivera and goes into exile on Fuerteventura in the Canary Islands.
  - Richard L. Simon and M. Lincoln ("Max") Schuster establish the New York City publisher Simon & Schuster, which initially specializes in crossword puzzle books.
- January 15 – The world's first radio play, Danger by Richard Hughes, is broadcast by the B.B.C. from its London studios.
- February 2 – A largely rewritten version of Roi Cooper Megrue and Walter Hackett's 1914 farce It Pays to Advertise opens in a production by actor-manager Tom Walls, at the Aldwych Theatre in London. It runs until 10 July 1925, a total of 598 performances, as the first in a sequence of twelve Aldwych farces.
- March 3 – Seán O'Casey's drama Juno and the Paycock opens at the Abbey Theatre, Dublin.
- March
  - Leonard and Virginia Woolf move themselves and the Hogarth Press back to a house in Bloomsbury at 52 Tavistock Square, London.
  - Weird Tales magazine publishes H. P. Lovecraft's story "The Rats in the Walls" in the United States.
- April – Ford Madox Ford publishes the first of four volumes set around World War I, titled Parade's End. It is completed in 1928.
- April 12 – The Indian poet Rabindranath Tagore arrives in China, where his views prove controversial. While there, he becomes associated with the innovative poets Xu Zhimo and Lin Huiyin.
- May 3 – F. Scott and Zelda Fitzgerald leave New York for France.
- June – Ret Marut, perhaps previously Otto Feige and presumed later to be the writer B. Traven, leaves Europe for Mexico.
- June 4 – E. M. Forster's novel A Passage to India is published in the U.K. He will write no further fiction in the remaining 46 years of his life.
- September – Buddenbrooks, the first of Thomas Mann's works to appear in English, is published in a translation by the American Helen T. Lowe-Porter. The original German appeared in 1901.
- unknown dates
  - The Hebrew language poet Hayim Nahman Bialik relocates with his publishing house Dvir from Berlin to Tel Aviv.
  - The Argosy Book Store is founded in New York City, United States.
  - Luxemburger Illustrierte newspaper begins publication in Luxembourg (ceased 1931).

== New books ==
=== Fiction ===
- Felix Aderca – Moartea unei republici roșii
- Michael Arlen – The Green Hat
- Henry Howarth Bashford (anonymously) – Augustus Carp, Esq., By Himself: Being the Autobiography of a Really Good Man
- Pierre Benoit – The Lady of Lebanon
- Johan Bojer – Vor egen stamme (The Emigrants)
- Lynn Brock – The Deductions of Colonel Gore
- Louis Bromfield – The Green Bay Tree
- John Buchan – The Three Hostages
- Edgar Rice Burroughs
  - The Land That Time Forgot
  - Tarzan and the Ant Men
- Agatha Christie
  - The Man in the Brown Suit
  - Poirot Investigates
- Freeman Wills Crofts – Inspector French's Greatest Case
- James Oliver Curwood – A Gentleman of Courage
- Alfred Döblin – Berge Meere und Giganten (Mountains, Seas and Giants)
- Edna Ferber – So Big
- Charles Finger – Tales from Silver Lands
- Dorothy Canfield Fisher – The Home-Maker
- Ford Madox Ford – Some Do Not . . .
- Jean Forge – Saltego trans Jarmiloj
- E. M. Forster – A Passage to India
- Gilbert Frankau – Gerald Cranston's Lady
- John Galsworthy – The White Monkey
- Garet Garrett – Satan's Bushel
- Zane Grey – Call of the Canyon
- Robert Hichens – After the Verdict
- Winifred Holtby – The Crowded Street
- Margaret Irwin – Still She Wished for Company
- Mikheil Javakhishvili – Kvachi Kvachantiradze (Georgian: კვაჭი კვაჭანტირაძე)
- Harry Stephen Keeler – The Voice of the Seven Sparrows
- Margaret Kennedy – The Constant Nymph
- Magdalen King-Hall (as Cleone Knox) – Diary of a Young Lady of Fashion 1764–65
- Halldór Laxness – Undir Helgahnúk
- Marie Belloc Lowndes – The Terriford Mystery
- Benito Lynch – The Englishman of the Bones
- Philip MacDonald – The Rasp
- Thomas Mann – The Magic Mountain (Der Zauberberg)
- Lucia Mantu – Cucoana Olimpia
- Katherine Mansfield – Something Childish and Other Stories
- John Masefield – Sard Harker
- F. M. Mayor – The Rector's Daughter
- Herman Melville (d. 1891) – Billy Budd, Sailor
- Dmitry Merezhkovsky – Akhnaton, King of Egypt
- Hope Mirrlees – The Counterplot
- George Moore – Peronnik the Fool
- Paul Morand – Lewis and Irene
- Ralph Hale Mottram – The Spanish Farm
- E. Phillips Oppenheim – The Wrath to Come
- Baroness Orczy
  - The Honourable Jim
  - Pimpernel and Rosemary
  - Les Beaux et les Dandys de Grand Siècles en Angleterre
- E. Phillips Oppenheim – The Ex-Duke
- Ernest Pérochon – Les Gardiennes
- Eden Phillpotts – The Treasures of Typhon
- Edward Plunkett, 18th Baron of Dunsany – The King of Elfland's Daughter
- Joseph Roth
  - Hotel Savoy
  - Rebellion
- Arthur Schnitzler – Fräulein Else
- Arthur D. Howden Smith – Porto Bello Gold
- Cecil Street – The Double Florin
- Þórbergur Þórðarson – Bréf til Láru
- Edgar Wallace
  - The Dark Eyes of London
  - Double Dan
  - The Face in the Night
  - Room 13
  - The Sinister Man
  - The Three Oak Mystery
- Hugh Walpole – The Old Ladies
- Mary Webb – Precious Bane
- H. G. Wells – The Dream
- Edith Wharton – The Old Maid
- Walter F. White – The Fire In The Flint
- P. C. Wren – Beau Geste
- Francis Brett Young
  - Cold Harbour
  - Woodsmoke
- Yevgeny Zamyatin – We (first published, in English translation)

=== Children and young people ===
- Edgar Rice Burroughs
  - The Land That Time Forgot
  - Tarzan and the Ant Men
- Johan Fabricius – De Scheepsjongens van Bontekoe (The Cabin Boys of Bontekoe, translated as Java Ho!: The Adventures of Three Boys Amid Fire, Storm and Shipwreck)
- Hugh Lofting – Doctor Dolittle's Circus (4th in a series of 13 books)
- Anne Parrish – The Dream Coach
- Albert Payson Terhune – The Heart of a Dog
- Ruth Plumly Thompson – Grampa in Oz (18th in the Oz series overall and the fourth written by her)
- Else Ury
  - Nesthäkchen's Youngest (Nesthäkchens Jüngste)
  - Nesthäkchen and Her Grandchildren (Nesthäkchen und Ihre Enkel)
- Gertrude Chandler Warner – The Box-Car Children

=== Drama ===
- Maxwell Anderson and Laurence Stallings – What Price Glory?
- Louis Aragon – Backs to the Wall
- Bertolt Brecht – The Life of Edward II of England (Leben Eduards des Zweiten von England, adapted from Marlowe)
- Mikhail Bulgakov – The Fatal Eggs (Роковые яйца)
- Alberto Casella – La morte in vacanza (Death Takes a Holiday)
- Noël Coward
  - The Vortex (first performed)
  - Hay Fever (written)
  - Easy Virtue (written)
- Ramón del Valle-Inclán – Bohemian Lights (Luces de Bohemia)
- Henri Duvernois and Pierre Wolff – After Love
- Nikolai Erdman – The Mandate (Мандат)
- Ian Hay – The Sport of Kings
- Agha Hashar Kashmiri – Aankh ka Nasha
- George S. Kaufman and Marc Connelly – Beggar on Horseback
- Frederick Lonsdale
  - The Fake
  - The Street Singer
- Ivor Novello – The Rat
- Seán O'Casey – Juno and the Paycock
- Eugene O'Neill – Desire Under the Elms
- E. Phillips Oppenheim – The Passionate Quest
- Louis N. Parker – Our Nell
- Henrik Rytter – Herman Ravn
- Githa Sowerby – The Stepmother (written)
- Sergei Tretyakov – The Gas Masks (Противогазы)
- Tristan Tzara – Handkerchief of Clouds (Mouchoir de Nuages)
- Sutton Vane – Falling Leaves
- Stanisław Ignacy Witkiewicz – The Mother (Matka)

=== Poetry ===
- Edwin James Brady – The Land of the Sun
- Muhammad Iqbal – Bang-i-Dara
- A. A. Milne – When We Were Very Young
- Pablo Neruda – Twenty Love Poems and a Song of Despair (Veinte poemas de amor y una canción desesperada)
- Saint-John Perse – Anabase
- Jean-Joseph Rabearivelo – La Coupe de cendres (The cup of ashes)
- Sergei Yesenin – Land of Scoundrels

=== Non-fiction ===
- Alfred Rosling Bennett – London and Londoners in the 1850s and 1860s
- Sarah Bernhardt – The Art of the Theatre
- André Breton – The Surrealist Manifesto
- W. E. B. Du Bois – The Gift of Black Folk
- Emma Goldman – My Further Disillusionment in Russia
- Johan Huizinga – Erasmus
- Agnes Mure Mackenzie – The Women in Shakespeare's Plays
- Eileen Power – Medieval People
- Robert Athlyi Rogers – Holy Piby
- Jadunath Sarkar – History of Aurangzib
- Lowell Thomas – With Lawrence in Arabia
- Leon Trotsky – Literature and Revolution
- Jim Tully – Beggars of Life
- Mark Twain – The Autobiography of Mark Twain
- Hugh Walpole – The English Novel: Some Notes on its Evolution
- H. G. Wells – The Story of a Great Schoolmaster
- Margaret Wylie – Golden Wattle Cookery Book

== Births ==
- January 30
  - Lloyd Alexander, American writer (died 2007)
  - Margaret Yorke, English crime fiction writer (died 2012)
- February 3 – Andrzej Szczypiorski, Polish writer (died 2000)
- February 6 – Jin Yong, Chinese wuxia novelist (died 2018)
- February 17 – Margaret Truman, American writer and soprano (died 2008)
- April 3
  - Errol Brathwaite, New Zealand author (died 2005)
  - Josephine Pullein-Thompson, English children's novelist (died 2014)
- April 8 – Humberto Costantini, Argentinian writer (died 1987)
- April 20 – Miroslav Komárek, Czech historical linguist (died 2013)
- April 24
  - Clement Freud, German-born English writer and broadcaster (died 2009)
  - Clive King, English children's writer and academic (died 2018)
- April 26 – Solomon Mutswairo, Zimbabwean novelist and poet (died 2005)
- May 1 – Terry Southern, American writer (died 1995)
- May 3 – Yehuda Amichai, born Ludwig Pfeuffer, German-born Israeli Hebrew-language poet (died 2000)
- May 8 – Petru Dumitriu, Romanian novelist (died 2002)
- July 1 – Wang Huo, Chinese novelist and screenwriter (died 2025)
- July 15 – Finn Bjørnseth, Norwegian novelist (died 1973)
- July 30
  - William H. Gass, American novelist (died 2017)
  - José Antonio Villarreal, Chicano novelist (died 2010)
- August 3 – Leon Uris, American author (died 2003)
- August 6 – James Baldwin, American writer (died 1987)
- August 15 – Robert Bolt, English screenwriter and playwright (died 1995)
- August 17 – Evan S. Connell, American author (died 2013)
- August 22 – Ada Jafri, Indian poet writing in Urdu (died 2015)
- September 4 – Joan Aiken, English novelist (died 2004)
- September 14 – Davidson Nicol, Sierra Leonean diplomat, author (died 1994)
- September 27 – Josef Škvorecký, Czech-born novelist and publisher (died 2012)
- September 30 – Truman Capote, American fiction writer (died 1984)
- October 1 – Jimmy Carter, author and 39th President of the United States (died 2024)
- October 3 – Harvey Kurtzman, American cartoonist and editor (died 1993)
- October 5 – José Donoso, Chilean writer (died 1996)
- October 29 – Zbigniew Herbert, Polish writer (died 1998)
- November 21 – Christopher Tolkien, British academic and editor (died 2020)
- November 22 – Rosamunde Pilcher, English novelist (died 2019)
- December 10 – Mitzura Arghezi, Romanian book editor, illustrator, and politician (died 2015)
- December 29 – Francisco Nieva, Spanish playwright, novelist and short story writer (died 2016)
- unknown dates
  - Deirdre Cash (Criena Rohan), Australian novelist (died 1963)
  - Mengistu Lemma, Ethiopian playwright (died 1988)

== Deaths ==
- April 21 – Marie Corelli, English author (born 1855)
- May ? – Muhammad bin Fadlallah al-Sarawi, Iranian-Iraqi faqih, religious writer and poet (born c. 1880)
- May 1 – Lepha Eliza Bailey, American author, lecturer, and social reformer (born 1845)
- May 4 – E. Nesbit, English children's author (born 1858)
- June 3 – Franz Kafka, German-language author (born 1883)
- June 30 – Jacob Israël de Haan, Dutch-Jewish novelist, poet and journalist (assassinated, born 1881)
- August 3 – Joseph Conrad, Polish-born English novelist (born 1857)
- August 25 – Velma Caldwell Melville, American editor and writer (born 1858)
- August 26 – Julia Carter Aldrich, American author and editor (born 1834)
- October 9
  - Valery Bryusov, Russian Symbolist poet, dramatist and translator (born 1873)
  - Lin Shu, Chinese translator (born 1852)
- October 12 – Anatole France, French poet, novelist and journalist (born 1844)
- October 25 – Laura Jean Libbey, American novelist (born 1862)
- October 29 – Frances Hodgson Burnett, English-born children's author (born 1849)
- November 21 – Paul Milliet, French dramatist and librettist (born 1848)
- November 22 – Herman Heijermans, Dutch dramatist (born 1864)
- December 6 – Gene Stratton-Porter, American novelist and naturalist (born 1863)
- December 26 – Arnold Henry Savage Landor, English writer and artist (born 1865)
- December 27 – Jennie Thornley Clarke, American educator, writer, and anthologist (born 1860)
- unknown date – Nicolae Velo, Aromanian poet and diplomat in Romania (b. 1882)

== Awards ==
- James Tait Black Memorial Prize for fiction: E. M. Forster, A Passage to India
- James Tait Black Memorial Prize for biography: Rev. William Wilson, The House of Airlie
- Newbery Medal for children's literature: Charles Hawes, The Dark Frigate
- Nobel Prize in Literature: Władysław Reymont
- Pulitzer Prize for Drama: Hatcher Hughes, Hell-Bent Fer Heaven
- Pulitzer Prize for Poetry: Robert Frost, New Hampshire: A Poem with Notes and Grace Notes
- Pulitzer Prize for the Novel: Margaret Wilson, The Able McLaughlins
