= The Malpas Mystery =

1960 British film directed by Sidney Hayers

- Directed by: Sidney Hayers
- Written by: Paul Tabori; Gordon Wellesley
- Based on: novel The Face in the Night by Edgar Wallace
- Produced by: Julian Wintle; Leslie Parkyn
- Starring: Maureen Swanson; Allan Cuthbertson; Geoffrey Keen
- Cinematography: Michael Reed
- Edited by: Tristam Cones
- Music by: Elisabeth Lutyens
- Production companies: Independent Artists; Langton Productions
- Distributed by: Anglo-Amalgamated Film Distributors (UK)
- Release date: October 1960 (UK)
- Running time: 69 minutes
- Country: United Kingdom
- Language: English

The Malpas Mystery is a 1960 British second feature ('B') crime film, directed by Sidney Hayers and starring Maureen Swanson and Allan Cuthbertson. The screenplay was by Paul Tabori and Gordon Wellesley, based on the 1924 Edgar Wallace novel The Face in the Night.

== Plot ==
When Audrey Bedford is released from prison, she finds herself embroiled with mysterious doctors, missing heirs, diamonds and murder. Her step-sister has dubious motives for letting her stay with her, an employer wants to pay her to work for somebody else, and a detective, convinced that she was wrongly convicted, tries despite her protests to protect her from further trouble.

== Cast ==
- Maureen Swanson as Audrey Bedford
- Allan Cuthbertson as Lacey Marshalt
- Geoffrey Keen as Torrington
- Ronald Howard as Dick Shannon
- Sandra Dorne as Dora Elton
- Alan Tilvern as Gordon Seager
- Leslie French as Witkins
- Catherine Feller as Jinette
- Richard Shaw as Kornfeldt
- Sheila Allen as Frau Kornfeldt
- Edward Cast as Laker

== Production ==
Anglo Amalgamated bought he rights to a number of mysteries by Edgar Wallace, and eventually filmed over forty. The Clue of the Twisted Candle was first, followed by Marriage of Convenience, The Malpas Mystery and The Man Who Was Nobody. Malpas would be the only one not produced by Jack Greenwood. Filming started on 27 June 1960.

The film was one of the last appearances of Maureen Swanson who soon retired when she was married.

Although originally made by Independent Artists at Beaconsfield studios, it was included in the Merton Park series of Edgar Wallace Mysteries. It went on general release on the ABC Cinemas circuit on 17 September 1961 supporting Raising the Wind (1961).

The original cut was 69 minutes but there was also an edited 55 minute version.

== Critical reception ==
The Monthly Film Bulletin wrote: "As intriguing as most films featuring an apparently maimed, shaggy and faceless recluse holed up in a derelict house, The Malpas Mystery grips because a sparkling pace manages to conceal most of its narrative shortcomings. Slightly above the average of Merton Park's recent Edgar Wallace adaptations, it is competently made [and] maintains its air of mystery."

Kine Weekly wrote: "Intriguing mystery melodrama. ... The plot is a tangled skein, but the cast and drirector quickly unravel it in circumstances that furnish all round lively entertainment."

Variety said: "Very complicated plot, involving jewel thieves and the reunion of a father with a long-lost daughter can be followed if attention is paid. Maureen Swanson makes an appealing heroine, her vulnerability adding to the suspense."
