= The Story of a Great Schoolmaster =

1924 biography by H. G. Wells

- First US edition
- Author: H. G. Wells
- Original title: The Story of a Great Schoolmaster; Being a Plain Account of the Life and Ideas of Sanderson of Oundle
- Language: English
- Subject: Frederick William Sanderson
- Genre: Biography
- Publisher: Chatto & Windus (UK); Macmillan Company (US)
- Publication date: 1924
- Publication place: United Kingdom
- Pages: 150
- Preceded by: The Dream
- Followed by: A Year of Prophesying

The Story of a Great Schoolmaster is a 1924 biography of Frederick William Sanderson (1857–1922) by H. G. Wells. It is the only biography Wells wrote. Sanderson was a personal friend, having met Wells in 1914 when his sons George Philip ('Gip'), born in 1901, and Frank Richard, born in 1903, became pupils at Oundle School, of which Sanderson was headmaster from 1892 to 1922. After Sanderson died, while giving a lecture at University College London, at which he was introduced by Wells, the famous author agreed to help produce a biography to raise money for the school. But in December 1922, after disagreements emerged with Sanderson's widow about his approach to the subject, Wells withdrew from the official biography (published in 1923 as Sanderson of Oundle; Wells wrote much of the text but the volume was published without listing an author) and published his own work separately.

== Themes ==
For Wells, Sanderson was "the greatest man I have ever known with any degree of intimacy." Wells emphasized Sanderson's originality not only as an innovative schoolmaster, but as a social and religious thinker whose liberal view of Christianity emphasized the notion helping and encouraging others to live not only "abundantly" but also "dangerously." Wells embraced Sanderson's hope that schools dedicated to solving problems related to human needs and emphasizing creativeness, cooperation, and the scientific search for truth could become model institutions inspiring broader social change, and quoted at length from Sanderson's sermons and speeches on these subjects in his biography.

== Reception ==
The Story of a Great Schoolmaster was translated into Swedish and was reprinted in vol. 24 of the 1924 28-volume Atlantic edition of Wells's works, after Joan and Peter.
