= Johan Fabricius (disambiguation) =

Johan Fabricius (1899–1981) was a Dutch writer, journalist, and adventurer.

Johan Fabricius or Johann Fabricius may also refer to:

- Johan Christian Fabricius (1745–1808), Danish zoologist
- Johann Albert Fabricius (1668–1736), German classical scholar and bibliographer
- Johann Phillip Fabricius (1711–1791), German missionary and scholar

== See also ==
- Johannes Fabricius (1587–1616), German astronomer
