= Rita Rait-Kovaleva =

Soviet translator and writer (1898–1988)

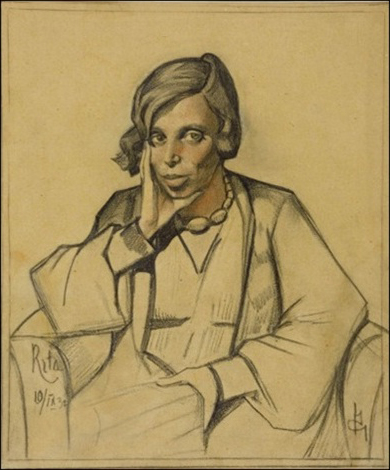
Portrait of Rait-Kovaleva by Nikolai Ushin, 1932

Rita Yakovlevna Rait-Kovaleva, born Chernomordik (19 April 1898 – 29 December 1988) was a Soviet literary translator and writer, particularly known for her translations of J. D. Salinger and Kurt Vonnegut into Russian. Rait-Kovaleva's translation of The Catcher in the Rye (as Over the Abyss in Rye) achieved initial popularity amid novel's success among Soviet readers during Khrushchev Thaw.

Rait-Kovaleva received the Order of Friendship of Peoples and the Thornton Wilder Prize from the Columbia University's Translation Center.

== Life ==
Born into a Jewish family in the village of Petrushevo, Kherson Oblast, then in Russian Empire, Rait-Kovaleva graduated from the medical faculty of the Moscow University in 1924. She initially worked in medical institutions, but at the same time began a literary activity in 1920 by translating Mayakovski's Mystery-Bouffe into English. Rait-Kovaleva then started to teach English in the Military and Technology Academy in Leningrad. In 1938, Rait-Kovaleva became a member of the Union of Writers of the USSR. In 1959, Rait-Kovaleva authored a book about Robert Burns. She also published memoirs about Anna Akhmatova, Vladimir Mayakovsky, Velimir Khlebnikov and Boris Pasternak.

=== Translations ===
Rait-Kovaleva wrote: "One can really comprehend the language of Faulkner's protagonists only if one knows the pretentious Southern speech of scions of 'noble' families and the inconsistent (both simplified and intricate) speech of 'poor whites' and Negro farmhands and sharecroppers in which – side by side with the biblical lexicon and in the rhythm of the spirituals – one hears underworld slang with Anglo-Saxon four-letter words".

Rait-Kovaleva's translation of The Catcher in the Rye (Russian: Над пропастью во ржи, Over the Abyss in Rye) was first published in the Soviet Union in the November 1960 issue of the literary magazine Inostrannaya Literatura. The translation had only superficial adaptations for Soviet readers, such as cutlets (kotlety) instead of hamburgers. According to Russian philosopher Boris Paramonov, Rait-Kovaleva captured the street slang of the novel's protagonist Holden Caulfield "without losing the sharpness and wit of the original version", although she had never been to the United States. It was also noted, however, that the translation smoothed Caulfield's rougher language and excised obscenities. Rait-Kovaleva also translated from French and German, including such authors as Franz Kafka and Heinrich Böll.

== Selected works ==
- Man from the Musée de l'Homme. The Story of Boris Vildé (1982, «Человек из музея человека. Повесть о Борисе Вильде») Moscow; Sovetsky Pisatel P. 336
