= Operation Cupid =

1960 British film by Charles Saunders

- Original British quad poster
- Directed by: Charles Saunders
- Written by: Jack Taylor; Brock Williams
- Produced by: Guido Coen
- Starring: Charles Farrell; Avice Landone; Wallas Eaton; Harold Goodwin
- Cinematography: Walter J. Harvey
- Edited by: Peter Pitt
- Music by: Malcolm Lockyer
- Production company: Twickenham Film Studios
- Distributed by: J. Arthur Rank Film Distributors
- Release date: April 1960
- Running time: 62 minutes
- Country: United Kingdom
- Language: English

Operation Cupid is a 1960 British second feature ('B') comedy film directed by Charles Saunders and starring Charles Farrell, Avice Landone and Wallas Eaton. It was written by Jack Taylor and Brock Williams.

== Plot ==
A gang of criminals win a marriage agency during a card game and plan to use it to arrange a lucrative marriage for one of their gang to an extremely wealthy heiress.

== Cast ==
- Charles Farrell as Charlie Stevens
- Avice Landone as Mrs. Mountjoy
- Wallas Eaton as Cecil
- Harold Goodwin as Mervyn
- Norma Parnell as Lola
- Charles Clay as Mr. Cupid
- Wally Patch as bookmaker
- Pauline Shepherd as Sylvie
- Neil Hallett as Tom
- Roy Jefferies as insurance representative
- Edward Malin as Smelly
- Audrey Nicholson as nurse
- George Patterson as Monty
- Colin Rix as postman
- Beth Rogan as barmaid
- David Saire as Claude
- Bruce Seton as representative
- Martin Sterndale as foreman

== Production ==
It was made at Twickenham Studios in west London.

== Critical reception ==
The Monthly Film Bulletin wrote: "This artless comedy opens promisingly, but poverty of invention, uneven direction and weak scripting – not to mention song and dance padding – quickly tax the efforts of the cast. The net result fails to score on any level."

In British Sound Films: The Studio Years 1928–1959 David Quinlan rated the film as "mediocre", writing: "Weak comedy wastes good idea."
