= Pauline Shepherd =

British actress and singer

- Born: 19 September 1938 (age 87); London, England
- Occupations: Actress, singer, model, fashion writer, dancer

Pauline Shepherd (born 19 September 1938) is a British actress and singer.

== Life ==
Shepherd was born in London on 19 September 1938. She made her television debut as a singer at sixteen in the BBC's Quite Contrary.

In 1955 she had the very first release on the Pye Nixa record label. In February 1958 she debuted on the variety stage at London's Metropolitan Theatre and soon embarked on a tour of Germany, where she performed with Ted Heath's Music.

== Filmography ==
=== Film ===
Year	Title	Role
1959	Friends and Neighbours	3rd girl
1960	Operation Cupid	Sylvie
1960	Marriage of Convenience	Evie Martin
1961	Payroll	Secretary
1961	Mr. Topaze	Lilette

=== Television ===
Year	Title	Role	Notes
1961	The Avengers	Valerie Marnell	Episode: "Dance with Death"
1961	No Hiding Place	Mrs. Moore	Episode: "Finale"
1961	Home Tonight	Jill	Several episodes

== Discography ==
Singles

PYE NIXA

- "Have you ever been lonely" / "Don’t cry little donkey" (1955)
- "Willie can" / "No not much" (1956)
- "Treasure of love" / "Come back my love" (1956)
- "The wisdom of a fool" / "By you, by you, by you" (1957)
- "Summer love" / "One" (1957)

COLUMBIA

- "Love me to pieces" / "Just between you and me" (1957)
