= The Face in the Night =

1924 novel

- Author: Edgar Wallace
- Language: English
- Genre: Thriller
- Publication date: 1924
- Publication place: United Kingdom
- Media type: Print

The Face in the Night is a 1924 thriller novel by the British writer Edgar Wallace.

== Film adaptation ==
In 1960 it was turned into the film The Malpas Mystery, directed by Sidney Hayers as part of a long-running series of Wallace films made at Merton Park Studios.

== Bibliography ==
- Goble, Alan. The Complete Index to Literary Sources in Film. Walter de Gruyter, 1999.

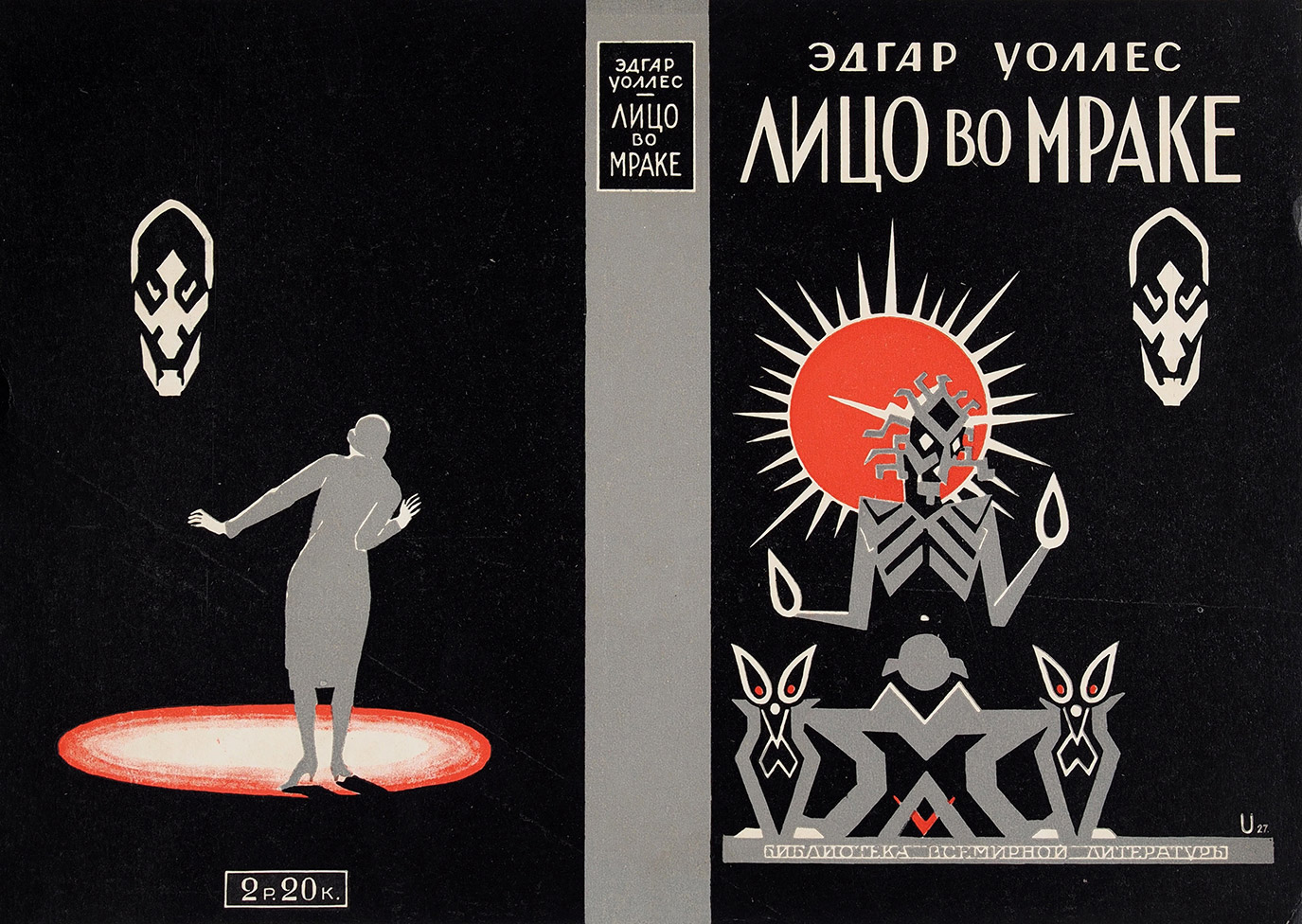
Russian edition of the 1927. Book cover by Nikolai Ushin
