= The Thousand Eyes of Dr. Mabuse =

1960 film by Fritz Lang

- German theatrical release poster
- German: Die 1000 Augen des Dr. Mabuse
- Directed by: Fritz Lang
- Written by: Fritz Lang; Heinz Oskar Wuttig
- Based on: Mr. Tot Aĉetas Mil Okulojn (1931 novel) by Jan Fethke; Dr. Mabuse by Norbert Jacques
- Produced by: Artur Brauner
- Starring: Dawn Addams; Peter van Eyck; Gert Fröbe
- Cinematography: Karl Löb
- Edited by: Walter Wischniewsky; Waltraut Wischniewsky
- Music by: Bert Grund; Werner Müller
- Production companies: CCC Filmkunst; CEI Incom; Critérion Film
- Distributed by: Prisma Filmverleih (West Germany); CEI Incom (Italy); Société Nouvelle de Cinématographie (France)
- Release dates: 14 September 1960 (West Germany); 9 December 1960 (Italy); 20 June 1961 (France)
- Running time: 103 minutes; 105 minutes (French cut)
- Countries: West Germany; Italy; France
- Language: German

The Thousand Eyes of Dr. Mabuse (German: Die 1000 Augen des Dr. Mabuse) is a 1960 crime thriller film directed by Fritz Lang. It is a sequel to Lang's 1933 film The Testament of Dr. Mabuse, and the third film directed by Lang to feature Norbert Jacques' fictional criminal mastermind Dr. Mabuse. It stars Wolfgang Preiss in the title role, along with Dawn Addams, Peter van Eyck, Gert Fröbe, Werner Peters, and Andrea Checchi. The screenplay is based on the novel Mr. Tot Buys A Thousand Eyes by Jan Fethke.

The film was Lang's final directorial work before his death in 1976. It was an international co-production between West German, Italian, and French studios. Distributed by Prisma Filmverleih, it spawned a series of Mabuse films that were released over the following years to compete with Rialto Film's Krimi films.

== Plot ==
A reporter is killed in his car on his way to work. Inspector Kras gets a call from his informant Peter Cornelius, a blind fortuneteller, who had a vision of the crime but not the perpetrator. Meanwhile, Henry Travers, a rich American industrialist, checks into the Luxor Hotel, which was outfitted by the Nazis during World War II to spy on people in every room. He becomes involved with Marian Menil, who is being threatened by her evil club-footed husband. Hieronymus B. Mistelzweig, purportedly an insurance salesman, is also a guest in the hotel and always seems to be lurking about. These disparate characters eventually get together to solve what appears to be the re-emergence of the long-dead Dr. Mabuse.

== Cast ==
- Peter van Eyck as Henry Travers
- Dawn Addams as Marion Menil
- Gert Fröbe as Inspector Kras
- Werner Peters as Hieronymus B. Mistelzweig
- Wolfgang Preiss as Professor S. Jordan / Dr. Mabuse / Peter Cornelius
- Andrea Checchi as Berg
- Howard Vernon as No. 12
- David Cameron as Michael Parker
- Reinhard Kolldehoff as Roberto Menil
- Nico Pepe as Luxor Hotel Manager
- Jean-Jacques Delbo as Dieterich
- Linda Sini as Corinna
- Rolf Weih as Interpol Chief
- Lotte Alberti as Agnes
- Manfred Grote as Paul Keyser
- Wolfgang Völz as Karl
- Rolf Moebius as Police Officer

== Production ==
The Thousand Eyes of Dr. Mabuse was co-produced by CCC Filmkunst (West Germany), C.E.I. Incom (Italy) and Critérion Film (France). The original titles were Die 1000 Augen des Dr. Mabuse (German), Il diabolico Dr. Mabuse (Italian) and Le diabolique docteur Mabuse (French).

It was the last film directed by Fritz Lang, who had returned from the U.S. to Germany to make what would turn out to be a total of three films for producer Artur Brauner: The Tiger of Eschnapur, The Indian Tomb and The Thousand Eyes of Dr. Mabuse. The film made use of the character Doctor Mabuse invented by Norbert Jacques, whom Lang had used in two previous films back in 1922 (Dr. Mabuse der Spieler, released in two parts) and 1933 (Das Testament des Dr. Mabuse).

The script of this film, written by Fritz Lang and Heinz Oskar Wuttig, was based on the Esperanto novel Mr. Tot Buys A Thousand Eyes by the Polish author Jan Fethke. It brought the Mabuse character from his previous pre-war appearances into contemporary times (the 1960s) and combined elements of the German Edgar Wallace film series, spy fiction and Big Brother surveillance with the nihilism of the Mabuse world.

Filming took place from 5 May to 28 June 1960 at the Spandau Studios in Berlin.

== Release ==
The film premiered on 14 September 1960 at the Gloria-Palast in Stuttgart (Germany) and on 28 June 1961 in Paris.

The French version of the film runs two minutes longer than the German cut, and features a different ending.

=== Home media ===
The film was released on Blu-Ray in the UK by the boutique label Eureka Entertainment in May 2020.

== Sequels ==
The film spawned a number of sequels, all made in a similar style and produced by Artur Brauner:

- The Return of Doctor Mabuse (1961), directed by Harald Reinl.
- The Invisible Dr. Mabuse (1962), directed by Harald Reinl.
- The Testament of Dr. Mabuse (1962) directed by Werner Klingler, a sequel to/remake of the film by Fritz Lang that was released in 1933.
- Scotland Yard Hunts Dr. Mabuse (1963), directed by Paul May.
- The Secret of Dr. Mabuse (1964), directed by Hugo Fregonese.
- The Vengeance of Dr. Mabuse (1970) directed by Jesus Franco.
