= The Sinister Man =

1961 British film by Clive Donner

- Theatrical release poster
- Directed by: Clive Donner
- Written by: Robert Banks Stewart
- Based on: novel The Sinister Man by Edgar Wallace
- Produced by: Jack Greenwood
- Starring: Patrick Allen; Gerald Anderson; William Gaunt; John Bentley
- Cinematography: Bert Mason
- Edited by: Derek Holding
- Music by: Charles Blackwell
- Distributed by: Anglo-Amalgamated Film Distributors
- Release date: December 1961
- Running time: 58 minutes
- Country: United Kingdom
- Language: English

The Sinister Man is a 1961 British crime drama film directed by Clive Donner and starring Patrick Allen and John Bentley. The screenplay was by Robert Banks Stewart based on the 1924 Edgar Wallace novel of the same title. It was one of the series of Edgar Wallace Mysteries, British second-features, produced at Merton Park Studios in the 1960s.

== Plot ==
The body of an Oxford professor is found floating in the river Thames. He had previously been studying an archeological artefact known as the Kytang Wafers, and this is now missing. Scotland Yard investigates. The wafers are bits of ancient text that could alter the relations between Red China and a Tibetan type nation called "Kytang". An autopsy reveals that the professor was murdered by a karate blow.

== Cast ==
- John Bentley as Superintendent Wills
- Patrick Allen as Dr. Nelson Pollard
- Gerald Andersen as Major Paul Amery
- Edward Atienza as Clerk
- Wilfrid Brambell as lock-keeper
- Yvonne Buckingham as Miss Russell
- Michael Deacon as Angus
- Jacqueline Ellis as Elsa Marlowe
- Keith Faulkner as lock-keeper's assistant
- William Gaunt as Mitch Hallam
- John Glyn-Jones as Dr. Maurice Tarn
- Peter Hager as warden
- John Horsley as pathologist
- Burt Kwouk as Captain Feng
- Arnold Lee as Soyok
- Robert Lee as Nam Lee
- Brian McDermott as Detective Sergeant Stillman
- Don McKillop as reporter

== Critical reception ==
The Monthly Film Bulletin wrote: "Hectic penny dreadful, without subtlety or surprise. Clive Donner's direction has intermittent punch, but the jaded format of these Edgar Wallace quickies is beginning to defeat any attempt at even the simplest kind of style."

Kine Weekly wrote: "The picture comes in the thick ear rather than the whodunnit category, yet has a twist, in-the-nick-of-time climax. John Bentley adopts a very professional air as Wills, Patrick Allen makes a menacing Pollard, Jacqueline Ellis is an intelligent and comely Elsa, and Eric Young and Arnold Lee register in Oriental roles. There is little romance and less comedy, but a hell-for-leather approach gives the shenanigans edge."

Leslie Halliwell wrote: "Very tolerable minor thriller in the Edgar Wallace series: short, sharp and snappy."

Robert Murphy wrote: "Clive Donner's Marriage of Convenience and The Sinister Man are very stylish, and clearly marked him out for higher things."

MemorableTV.com described the film as "definitely one of the great Edgar Wallace entries with a fab cast that includes a pre-Steptoe Wilfred Brambell, Patrick Allen, William Gaunt and Burt Kwouk. John Bentley who took the lead as Superintendent Willis was a popular actor in the late fifties and early sixties but is all but forgotten these days."

Classic Movie Ramblings wrote "The Sinister Man isn't exactly a good movie but it has plenty of energy and a few intriguingly odd moments. I found it to be strangely appealing."

== Home media ==
The film is included in Volume 2 of The Edgar Wallace Mystery series, released on region 2 DVD by Network, in 2012.
