= Mr. Tot Aĉetas Mil Okulojn =

1931 novel by Jean Forge

Mr. Tot Buys A Thousand Eyes
- Author: Jean Forge
- Original title: Mr. Tot aĉetas mil okulojn
- Language: Esperanto
- Genre: Science fiction novel
- Publication date: 1931, 1973
- Publication place: Germany; reprinted in Helsinki, Finland
- Media type: Print (hardcover and paperback)
- Pages: 242

Mr. Tot aĉetas mil okulojn (English: Mr. Tot Buys A Thousand Eyes) is a fantasy adventure novel, and is the third novel originally written in Esperanto by Jean Forge. It appeared in 1931. The author's previous excessive use of suffixes, most noticeable in his previous work Saltego trans Jarmiloj, disappears in this novel.

A detective novel, but not a hair raising bloody fantasy. It is so modern, so richly saturated with psychological undertones and pulsating life, that its value greatly exceeds the standards that one generally has for novels of its genre.

The novel is included in William Auld's Basic Esperanto Reading List.

In 1960, Fritz Lang used the novel as a basis for his last film The Thousand Eyes of Dr. Mabuse.
