= Jan van Druten =

Dutch painter, sculptor and ceramist

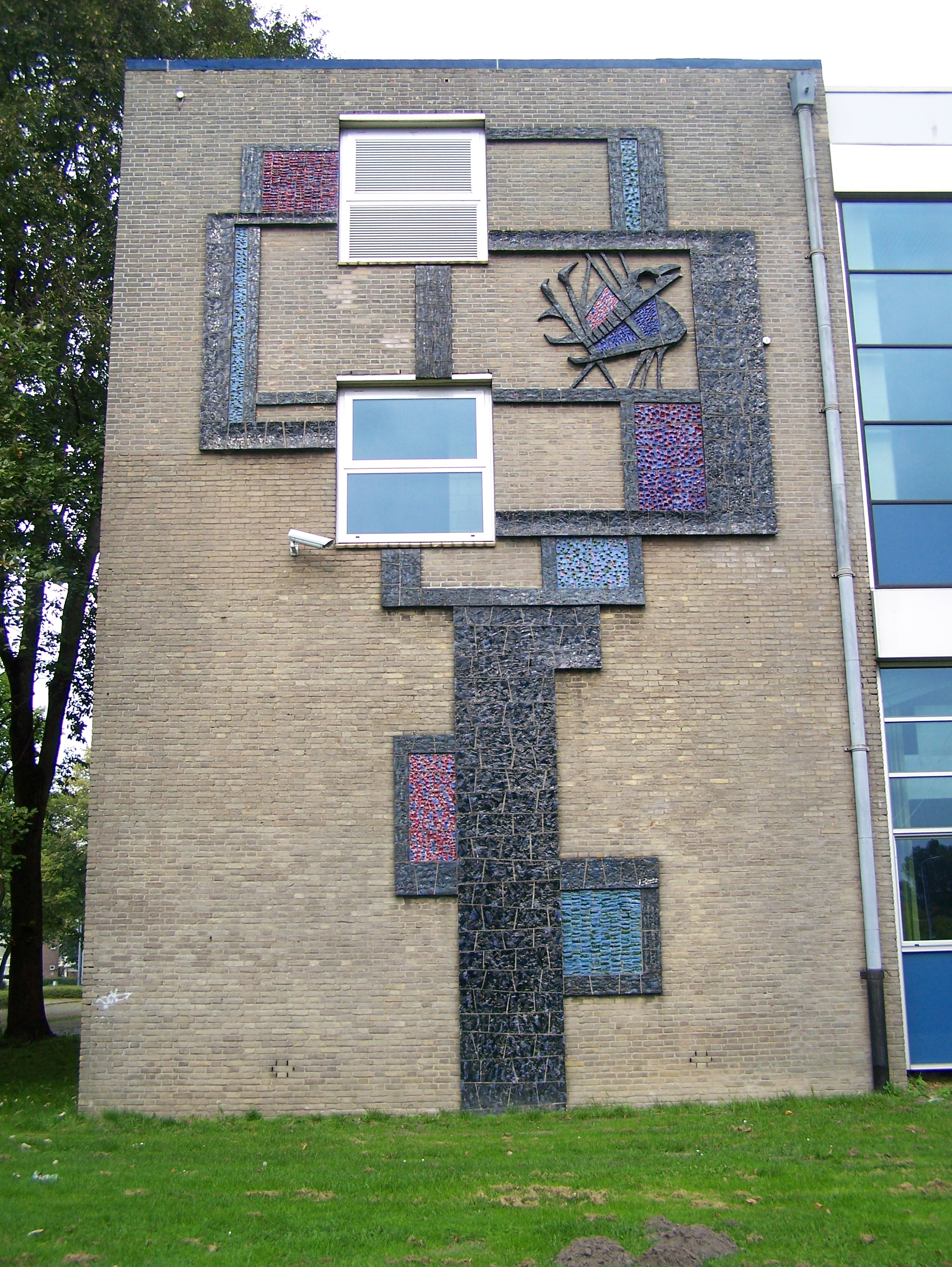
Ceramic facade in Alkmaar.

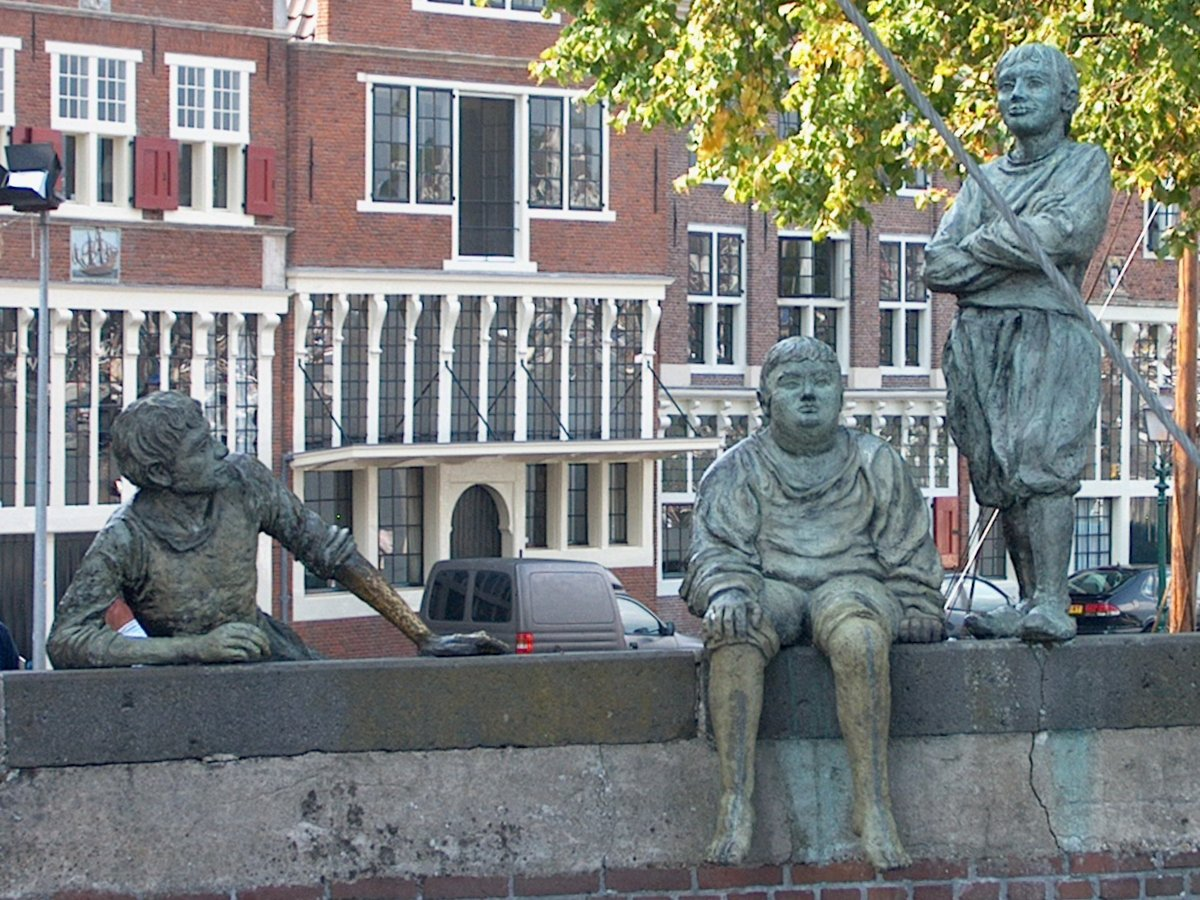
Statues of Bontekoe's cabin boys in Hoorn harbor, 1963

Martinus Johannes (Jan) van Druten (Nijmegen, 4 April 1916 – Amsterdam, 18 July 1993) was a Dutch painter, sculptor and ceramist.

== Life and work ==
Van Druten was initially cafe owner in Nijmegen. He studied, with some interruptions, between 1939 and 1949 at the Rijksacademie in Amsterdam and devoted himself to painting. According to the Netherlands Institute for Art History in 1946 he won the Prix de Rome. He was a member of the Algemeen Kristelijk Kunstenaarsverbond (General Catholic artists association).

Van Druten bought in 1963 a condemned house in Schellinkhout, which he renovated into a house and workshop. In 1965 he switched to sculpture. His images were collected after his death and on loan to the municipality Venhuizen.

== Works (selection) ==
- 1964 Calf, Oosterblokker
- 1967 Scheepsjongens van Bontekoe, Hoorn
- 1970 Het Ros Beiaard, Nijmegen
- 1970 Methuselah " Wervershoof
- 1975 tile decorations gymnasium, Beethovensingel, Alkmaar
- 1976? facade ceramics school, Vondelstraat, Alkmaar
- 1976 The buck, Oudega [5]
- 1978 Soudaens Suspicion Recognize Wervershoof

== See also ==
- List of Dutch ceramists
- List of Dutch sculptors
