= Jan Fabricius =

(1871–1964) Dutch playwright and writer

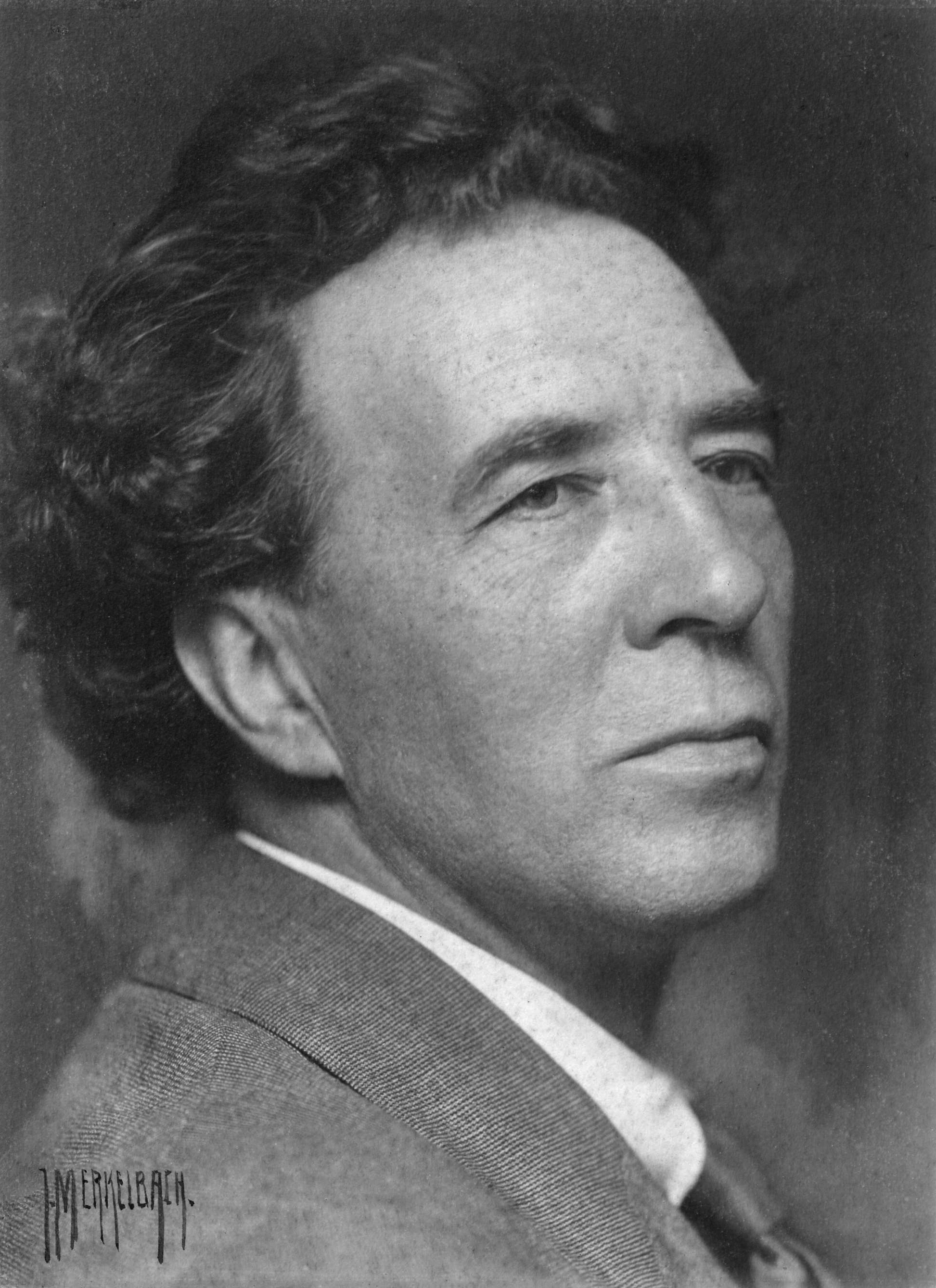
Jan Fabricius, by Jacob Merkelbach

Jan Fabricius (born Assen 30 September 1871, died Wimborne Minster, England, 23 November 1964) was a Dutch playwright and journalist. He was the father of Johan Fabricius, a writer. Although he wrote continuously from the 1890s to his death, his greatest period of success was during 1904-1916, when his plays sold out theatres in Rotterdam and were translated into multiple languages. During the height of his popularity he was considered by the Encyclopaedie van Nederlandsch-Indië to be the leading Dutch playwright writing plays set in the Indies.

== Early life ==
Jan grew up in what his son described as very simple circumstances, as the only son in a family with four daughters. His father was named Johan Fabricius. As a youth he worked to learn the French language and hoped to live in Paris.

== Career in publishing and newspapers ==
At the age of fifteen, Fabricius began to work as a letter-setter at the newspaper his father worked for, the Provinciale Drentsche en Asser Courant in Drenthe, Netherlands. Jan's first writing experience was when the paper allowed him to write coverage of the Winschoten local council meetings. In 1892 he left Europe for Batavia, Dutch East Indies. He obtained a position at Van Dorp & Co., a large printing company there. In 1896 he relocated to Bandung where he became involved in bookselling and publishing alongside Klaas de Vries, and founded the newspaper De Preangerbode. At this time he also brought over his wife from the Netherlands, Minke Donsweiffen.

In 1902 Fabricius was diagnosed with liver disease and was forced to return to the Netherlands. He settled in Haarlem and became head editor of De Wereldkroniek and De Spaarnebode. While living there he met the actor Frits Bouwmeester, brother of the more famous Louis Bouwmeester, who convinced him to start writing plays.

Fabricius briefly returned to the Dutch East Indies in 1910, first becoming the editor of the Soerabaijasch Handelsblad in Surabaya. According to his son, he did not get along with the owners of that paper. Hence they relocated to Batavia where he took up a position as lead editor of Bataviaasch Nieuwsblad. During this time, his son claims that he was too busy in his work to spend any time writing plays, although the release date of some of them may contradict this. However, health problems once again forced him to return to the Netherlands in 1914.

His work in the news thereafter seems to be limited to theatre topics, as for example in 1915 he was listed as a contributor "for Theatre" in the Hague publication De Toekomst.

== Career as a playwright and novelist ==
While back in Europe in the early 1900s, Fabricius had given advice to the actor Frits Bouwmeester about the conditions in the Indies in preparation for a tour there. The actor recognized Fabricius' writing talent and said that he would be happy to act in a play if Fabricius wrote one. Hence Fabricius wrote a handful of early "Indies plays" including Met den handschoen getrouwd (1906), Eenzaam (1907) and De rechte lijn (1910) which were performed hundreds of times by the Rotterdam Theatre.

Fabricius first moved to Paris upon his return to Europe. He wrote more plays there, some of which were about peasant life in Drenthe and Friesland, such as Onder één dak (1914) en Ynske (published 1922). These plays were at first not as successful as his earlier works, although Ynske would become popular in the late 1970s in a radio play adaption by Dick van Putten.

In 1915, Fabricius and his family relocated to The Hague. There he wrote one of his most popular works, Dolle Hans (1916), which played to sold out theaters in Rotterdam. Also released successful plays about life in the Indies, Totok en Indo (1915) and Nonnie (1916).

After that, he continued to write plays but none were ever as successful as those pieces, and he gradually stopped writing for the stage in the 1920s.

His piece Dolle Hans was performed in London during the 1930s, which convinced him to relocate to that country and hopefully find a second success there. He also met his second wife (Neville Colley) and remarried.

In 1938 he retired to rural Dorset, England where he continued to write in English The period of World War II was very difficult for him and his new wife, as he could not receive the royalties from Dutch performances of his earlier plays, which had at least provided him with a minimal income.

After the end of World War II, Fabricius was able to return to the Netherlands. He visited Assen and was recognized as an honorary citizen of the city. To mark the occasion he released a memoir of his early life there, titled Jeugdherinneringen van een Asser jongen (1946).

In 1949, the year the Netherlands recognized Indonesian Independence, Fabricius also released a nostalgic work about colonial times titled Tempo doeloe. Uit de Goeie Ouwe Tijd.

== Selected plays ==
- Met den handschoen getrouwd. Tooneelspel in drie bedrijven (1906)
- Eenzaam. Drama in drie bedrijven (1907)
- De rechte lijn. Tooneelspel in drie bedrijven (1910) (adapted in English as Straight Out by A.P. Peacock in 1915, available on Delpher.)
- Onder één dak. Tooneelspel in drie bedrijven. (1914)
- Tòtòk en indo. Een plantage-idylle in drie bedrijven (1915)
- Dolle Hans. Indo-drama in drie bedrijven. (1916)
- Nonni. Spel van sleur, voorschot en ethica, in drie bedrijven. (1916)
- Sonna. Indisch tooneelspel in drie bedrijven. (1916)
- Hein Roekoe (1917)
- De Meteoor (1919)
- De Reuzen van Klein Benting (1919)
- Ynske. Tooneelspel. (1922)
- Seideravond. Drama. (1923)
- Demon. Tooneelspel. (1924)
- Hein Roekoe. Volks-drama in drie bedrijven. (1924)
- Cesare als gastheer in de gevangenis. Romantisch gevangenis-avontuur in vijf taferelen. (1927)
- De butler. Detektivestuk in drie bedrijven. (1931)
- Een ridder kwam voorbij. Komedie in drie bedrijven. (1932)
- Afrekening. Familiedrama in drie bedrijven. (1937)
- Hare majesteit de vrouw. Blijspel in drie bedrijven. (1959)

== Selected books ==
- Jeugdherinneringen van een Asser jongen (1946)
- Tempo doeloe. Uit. de goeie ouwe tijd. Met penteek. van Menno van Meeteren Brouwer. (1949)
- De ring van de profeet (1952, with Anne de Vries)
- Mensen, die ik gekend heb (1960)
- Uit mijn tijd (1961).
