= Rotterdamsch Tooneel =

Dissolved Dutch theatre company

The Rotterdamsch Tooneel (Dutch: Rotterdam Theatre) was a Dutch theatre company founded in 1900 and which was dissolved in 1923.

== History ==
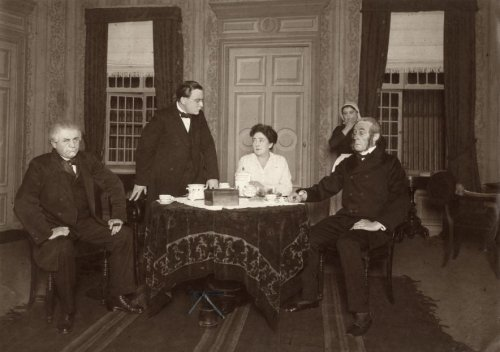
A scene from "Martin Jacobi's Remedie" being staged by the Rotterdamsch Tooneel, 1919

Because its name is fairly generic, there were other theatres in Rotterdam history which were known by the same name.

This twentieth century Rotterdamsch Tooneel was formed out an older theatre company, De Vereenigde Rotterdamsche Tooneelisten which had existed since 1884. In 1900 it was refounded as Rotterdamsch Tooneel. The theatre had a progressive reputation and mainly performed new Dutch repertoire, including Multatuli's Vorstenschool and the works of Jan Fabricius and J. van Randwijk. Their repertoire also included new foreign pieces, such as Zaken zijn zaken by Octave Mirbeau Liebelei by Arthur Schnitzler and Hedda Gabler by Henrik Ibsen. The troupe was considered to have a very high quality of productions. According to one 1925 obituary for one of its former actors, no matter which of the successive directors was running it during its prime, it had a recognizable style that was on part with any theatre in the country or even the world.

During its period of operation, actors associated with the Rotterdamsch Tooneel included Dick van Veen, Frits Tartaud, Piet Bron, Jan van Ees, Richard Flink, Cor van der Lugt Melsert, Else Mauhs, Alida Tartaud-Klein, and Jules Verstraete.

After World War I, public interest had diminished to such an extent that the group could only survive by merging with the Hague Hofstad Tooneel in 1923. The theaters merged under the new name Vereenigd Rotterdamsch-Hofstad Tooneel.
