= Dr. Mabuse =

Fictional villain created by Norbert Jacques

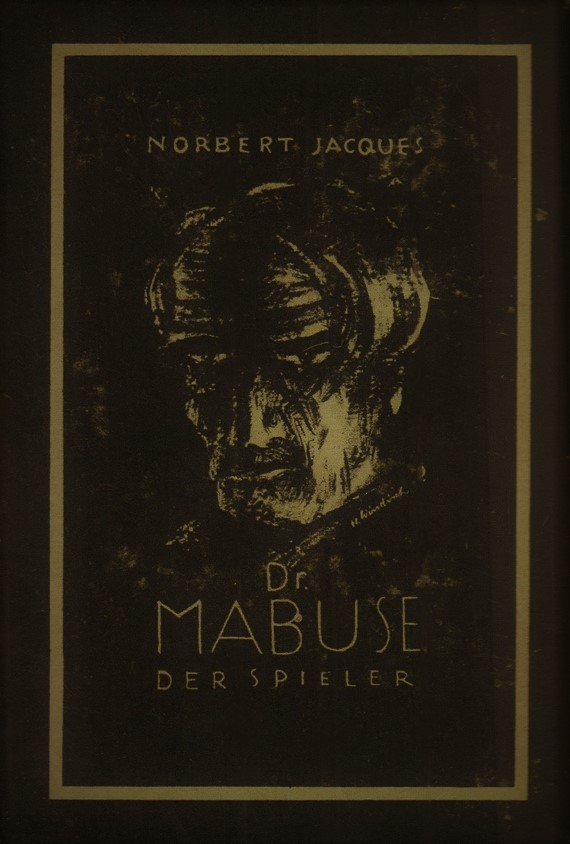
Dr. Mabuse

Dr. Mabuse is a fictional character created by Norbert Jacques in his 1921 novel Dr. Mabuse, der Spieler ('Dr. Mabuse, the Gambler'), and his 1932 follow-up novel Das Testament des Dr. Mabuse (1932). The character was made famous by three films about the character directed in Germany by Fritz Lang: Dr. Mabuse the Gambler (silent, 1922), The Testament of Dr. Mabuse (1933), and the much later The Thousand Eyes of Dr. Mabuse (1960). Five other films featuring Dr. Mabuse were made by other directors in Germany in the early 1960s, followed by Jess Franco's interpretation The Vengeance of Dr. Mabuse in 1971.

Although the character was deliberately written to mimic villains such as Dr. Fu Manchu, Guy Boothby's Doctor Nikola, Fantômas, or Svengali, the last of which was a direct inspiration, Jacques' goals were commercial success and to make political comments, in much the same way that the film The Cabinet of Dr. Caligari (1920) had done just a few years previously.

Much of the Mabuse works are comments by Jacques on German society, in some case, the political excesses of the 1930s.

== Description ==
Dr. Mabuse is a master of disguise and telepathic hypnosis known to employ body transference, most often through demonic possession, but sometimes utilizing object technologies such as television or phonograph machines, to build a "society of crime". Mabuse rarely commits his crimes in person, instead operating primarily through a network of agents enacting his schemes, thus remaining a shadowy figure. Mabuse's agents range from career criminals working for him, to innocents blackmailed or hypnotized into cooperation, to dupes manipulated so successfully that they do not realize that they are doing exactly what Mabuse planned for them to do.

Mabuse's identity often changes; one "Dr. Mabuse" may be defeated and sent to an asylum, jail or the grave, only for a new "Dr. Mabuse" to later appear, as depicted in The Testament of Dr. Mabuse. The replacement invariably has the same methods, the same powers of hypnosis and the same criminal genius. There are even suggestions in some installments of the series that the "real" Mabuse is some sort of spirit that possesses a series of hosts. Mabuse is therefore not a name in the normal sense, more a codename, or an ideology.

Mabuse has had a number of nemeses, with the main ones including Prosecutor (or Chief Inspector) von Wenk in Dr. Mabuse the Gambler (played by Bernhard Goetzke) and Kommissar Karl Lohmann (played variously by Otto Wernicke and Gert Fröbe as "Inspector Carl Lohemann").

== History ==
Mabuse first appeared in the 1921 German novel Dr. Mabuse, der Spieler ("Dr. Mabuse, the Gambler") by Norbert Jacques. The novel benefitted from unprecedented publicity and quickly became a best-seller. Fritz Lang, already an accomplished director, worked with his wife Thea von Harbou on an adaptation of the novel to bring it to the screen, where it also became a great success. The silent film Dr. Mabuse the Gambler (1922), with a playing time of more than four hours, was released in two sections: The Great Gambler: An Image of the Time and Inferno: A Game for the People of our Age.

Despite the success of the novel and the film, it was almost a decade before anything more was done with the character. Jacques had been working on a sequel to the novel, named Mabuse's Colony, in which Mabuse has died and a group of his devotees are starting an island colony, based on the principles described by Mabuse's manifesto. However, the novel was unfinished. After conversations with Lang and von Harbou, Jacques agreed to discontinue the novel and the sequel instead became the 1933 movie The Testament of Dr. Mabuse, in which the Mabuse of 1922 – played again by Rudolf Klein-Rogge – is an inmate in an insane asylum but has for some time been obsessively writing meticulous plans for crime and terrorism, plans that are being performed by a gang of criminals outside the asylum, who receive their orders from a person who has identified himself to them only as Dr. Mabuse.

== Filmography ==
English title	Original title	Release date	Dr. Mabuse played by:	Ref(s)
Dr. Mabuse the Gambler: Part I — The Great Gambler: A Picture of the Times	Dr. Mabuse, der Spieler I: Der große Spieler. Ein Bild der Zeit	27 April 1922	Rudolf Klein-Rogge	
Dr. Mabuse the Gambler: Part II — Inferno: The Game of the People of our Time	Dr. Mabuse, der Spieler II: Inferno. Ein Spiel von Menschen unserer Zeit	26 May 1922	Rudolf Klein-Rogge	
The Testament of Dr. Mabuse	Das Testament des Dr. Mabuse	April 1933	Rudolf Klein-Rogge	
The Thousand Eyes of Dr. Mabuse	Die 1000 Augen des Dr. Mabuse	September 14, 1960	Wolfgang Preiss	
The Return of Doctor Mabuse	Im Stahlnetz des Dr. Mabuse	October 13, 1961	Wolfgang Preiss	
The Invisible Dr. Mabuse	Die unsichtbaren Krallen des Dr. Mabuse	March 30, 1962	Wolfgang Preiss	
The Testament of Dr. Mabuse	Das Testament des Dr. Mabuse (remake)	September 7, 1962	Wolfgang Preiss	
Scotland Yard Hunts Dr. Mabuse (a.k.a. Dr. Mabuse vs. Scotland Yard)	Scotland Yard jagt Dr. Mabuse	September 20, 1963	Wolfgang Preiss	
The Secret of Dr. Mabuse (a.k.a. The Death Ray of Dr. Mabuse)	Die Todesstrahlen des Dr. Mabuse	September 18, 1964	Wolfgang Preiss (archive footage)/Claudio Gora	
The Vengeance of Dr. Mabuse	Dr. M schlägt zu	December 26, 1972	Jack Taylor	
Dorian Gray in the Mirror of the Yellow Press (a.k.a. The Image of Dorian Gray in the Yellow Press)	Dorian Gray im Spiegel der Boulevardpresse	1984	Delphine Seyrig	
Dr. M	Docteur M	1990	Alan Bates	
Doctor Mabuse		2013	Jerry Lacy	
Doctor Mabuse: Etiopomar		2014	Jerry Lacy	
The Thousand and One Lives of Doctor Mabuse		2020	Jerry Lacy	

== Bibliography ==
Novels

- Dr. Mabuse, Master of Mystery (original title: Dr. Mabuse, der Spieler) – English translation by Lilian A. Clare published in 1923.
- Das Testament des Dr. Mabuse – written in the early 1930s, but not published until 1950 under the title Dr. Mabuses letztes Spiel. In the late 1980s, it was reprinted under its original title Das Testament des Dr. Mabuse.
- Mabuses Kolonie – unfinished novel that was written in 1930 and published in 1994.
- Mabuse also appears in Jacques's 1923 sci-fi novel Ingenieur Mars.
- Jacques wrote a novel called Der Chemiker des Dr. Mabuse, but he ultimately removed all references to Mabuse from it and serialized it in 1934 under the title Chemiker Null.

Short stories

- "Dr. Mabuse auf dem Presseball" (1923)

== Stories by Other Writers ==
Novels

- The Ancestral Arts of Sophie Wolf series (2023) by author Bernard M Lyons features Dr Mabuse as the chief antagonist in a modern Bamberg.
