= De Scheepsjongens van Bontekoe (film) =

2007 film by Steven de Jong

- Directed by: Steven de Jong
- Release date: 11 November 2007
- Country: Netherlands
- Language: Dutch

De Scheepsjongens van Bontekoe (English title: Storm Bound) is a 2007 Dutch family film, directed by Steven de Jong.

The film received a Golden Film for 100,000 visitors.

The film is based on the book Java Ho!, written by Johan Fabricius and published in 1924.

== Plot / differences with the book ==
In the film three of the boys play the central roles: Hajo, Rolf, and Padde, while Harmen is here an adult. In the film after the ship wreck the four plus Hein Rol and two other men are in a lifeboat. They do not make a sail but row. They assume that Willem Bontekoe is dead. One of the men dies. The remaining six meet locals and trade with them. Rol and another man try to steal from the locals, after which the six are attacked. The three boys together with local girl Dolimah move on. After some time Dolimah returns, and the three reach Java. However, the danger is not over because the authorities want to kill Padde because the ship wreck was his fault. Bontekoe shows up, he has survived too, and saves Padde by lying that it is not him. They get a job on Bontekoe's new ship on its voyage home. Hajo proudly brings his earnings to his poor mother.
