= Saltego trans Jarmiloj =

1924 novel by Jan Fethke

A Leap across Millennia
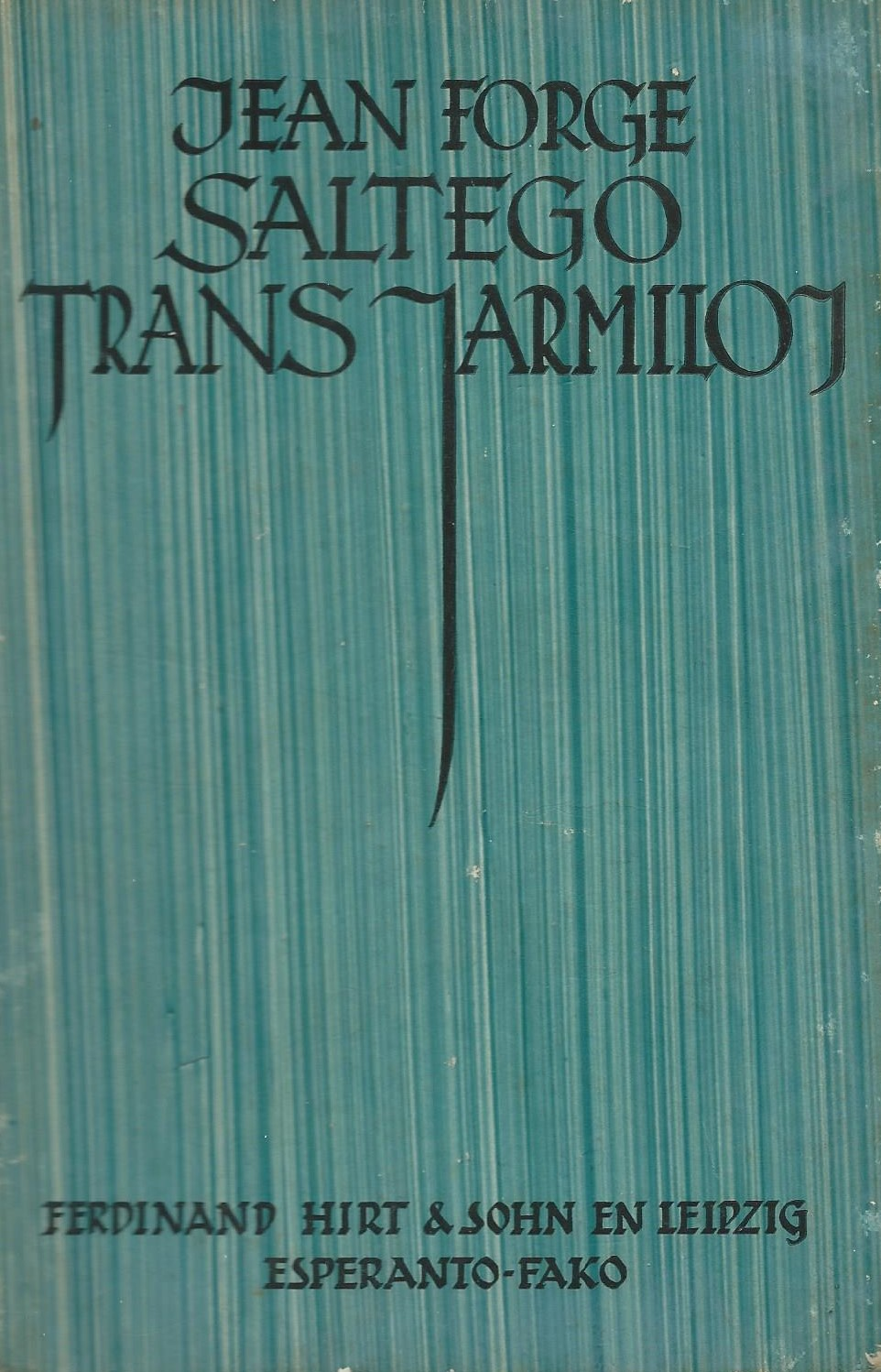
- Author: Jean Forge
- Original title: Saltego trans Jarmiloj
- Language: Esperanto
- Genre: Science fiction novel
- Publisher: 1st. Ferdinand Hirt & Sohn; 2nd. Fondumo Esperanto
- Publication date: 1924, 1973
- Publication place: 1st. Leipzig, Germany; 2nd. Helsinki, Finland
- Media type: 1st. Print (hardcover)
- Pages: 192; 196
- ISBN: 0-9590052-7-7
- OCLC: 16838182

Saltego trans Jarmiloj (English: Leap across the Millennia) is a novel originally written in Esperanto by Jean Forge. His second Esperanto novel, it was first published in 1924. It is a light, satirical fantasy, telling the story of characters who are transported back in time to the era of Emperor Nero.

The novel has been compared unfavourably to Forge's first novel, Abismoj. Commentators have variously found it amusing and romantic, praised its dynamic narrative style, and criticised it as "not more than banal - although not without interest, just low standard".

== Sources ==
The first version of this article was translated from the Esperanto Vikipedio.
