= The Three Oak Mystery =

1924 novel by Edgar Wallace

- Author: Edgar Wallace
- Language: English
- Genre: Crime
- Publication date: 1924
- Publication place: United Kingdom
- Media type: Print

The Three Oak Mystery is a 1924 crime novel by the British writer Edgar Wallace.

== Film adaptation ==
In 1960 it was turned into the film Marriage of Convenience, directed by Clive Donner as part of a long-running series of Wallace films made at Merton Park Studios.

== Bibliography ==
- Goble, Alan. The Complete Index to Literary Sources in Film. Walter de Gruyter, 1999.
