= Jan Fethke =

German-Polish film director (1903–1980)

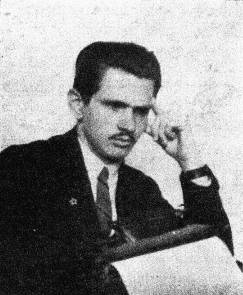
Jan Fethke

Jan Fethke (26 February 1903 – 16 December 1980) was a German-Polish film director and, under the pen name Jean Forge, a successful author. He also was a famous proponent of the language Esperanto.

== Life ==
Born in Oppeln, Silesia, Jan Fethke attended Oppeln's grammar school. Together with his brothers Stefan and Edmond, Fethke learned Esperanto in 1919, when aged sixteen. After leaving grammar school, he edited the periodical Esperanto Triumfonta for several years.

Between 1923 and 1924 studied at Technical University of Danzig and worked for a local newspaper before moving to Berlin.

In 1921, aged 18, he penned his first novel, the German language Der ausgestopfte Papagei (The Stuffed Parrot). After 1923, he wrote his novels in Esperanto and used the pseudonym Jean Forge. His most important Esperanto works are Abismoj (Abysses, 1923), Saltego trans jarmiloj (A Leap across the Millennia, 1924) and Mr. Tot Aĉetas Mil Okulojn (Mr. Tot Buys a Thousand Eyes, 1931), which have been translated into several languages. His books were inventive, rich in ideas, and a witty representative of enjoyable light literature with a talent for psychological observation and a precise knowledge of effects.

After moving to Berlin in 1928, Fethke worked as a writer and assistant for Ufa. His most successful films were Mutter Krausens Fahrt ins Glück (Mommy Krause's Trip into Happiness) and Jenseits der Straße (On the Far Side of the Street), for which he wrote the screenplay. At Ufa, he also made the acquaintance of Fritz Lang, who later used his Mr. Tot novel for his last film, The Thousand Eyes of Dr. Mabuse (1960).

He also continued his work in Esperanto. In 1932 began to teach courses in Sweden, using the Cseh-method. In 1934 he dubbed the German film Morgen beginnt das Leben (Life will Start Tomorrow) into Esperanto and, under the title Morgaŭ ni komencos la vivon, exhibited during the 26th World Esperanto Congress in Stockholm.

After the Second World War, Fethke achieved fame as a film director in Poland. In 1960, he moved to West Berlin.

He was a collaborator of the review Literatura Mondo (Literary World) and many other periodicals.

== Selected works ==
=== Novels ===
- Abismoj (Abysses), 1923
- Saltego trans Jarmiloj (A Leap across the Millennia), 1924
- Mr. Tot Aĉetas Mil Okulojn (Mr. Tot Buys a Thousand Eyes), 1931

=== Collection of novellas ===
- La verda raketo ("The green rocket") 1961
- Mia verda breviero ("My green prayer book"), 1974

=== Films ===
- Mother Krause's Journey to Happiness, 1929 (screenplay).
- Beyond the Street (1929) (screenplay together with Willy Döll).
- Schön ist es, verliebt zu sein, 1933/34 (screenplay).
- Carlos schönstes Abenteuer, 1934 (screenplay).
- Morgaŭ ni komencos la vivon, an Esperanto version of Morgen beginnt das Leben, 1934 (dubbing).
- Petersburger Nächte, 1935 (screenplay).
- Quadrille d'amour, 1935 (screenplay).
- The Cat in the Bag (1935) (screenplay)
- Two Joasias (1935) (screenplay)
- American Adventure (1936) (screenplay)
- Papa się żeni, 1936 (screenplay)
- The Haunted Manor (1936) (screenplay)
- Dodek na froncie, 1936 (screenplay)
- The Leper, 1936 (screenplay)
- Count Michorowski 1937 (screenplay)
- Three Troublemakers (1937) (screenplay)
- Robert i Bertrand, 1938 (screenplay)
- Zapomniana melodia, 1938 (directed together with Konrad Tom)
- Bogurodzica, 1939 (director)
- Przez łzy do szczęścia, 1939 (director, screenplay)
- Złota Maska, 1939/40 (director, screenplay)
- To Happiness Through Tears (1941) (director)
- Bravo, Little Thomas, 1945 (director).
- Ulica graniczna, 1948 (screenplay)
- Załoga, 1951 (director, screenplay)
- A Matter to Settle, 1953 (director, screenplay)
- Irena do domu!, 1955 (director).
- Der schweigende Stern (Milcząca gwiazda), 1959 (screenplay), an East German-Polish co-production.
