= Willem Bontekoe =

Dutch East India Company skipper

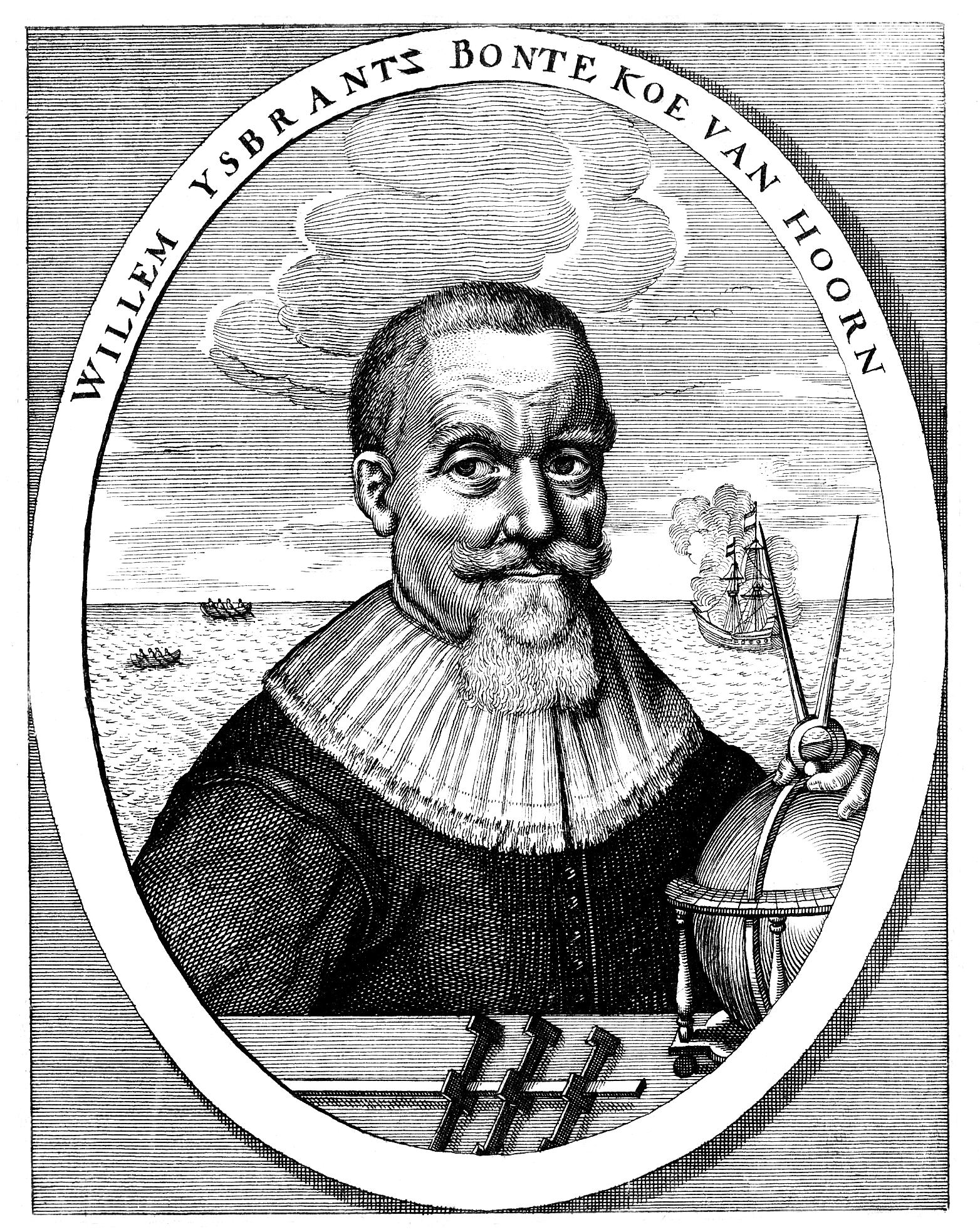
Willem IJsbrantsz Bontekoe

Willem Ysbrandtszoon Bontekoe (June 2, 1587 – 1657) was a skipper in the Dutch East India Company (VOC), who made only one voyage for the company (1618–1625). He became widely known because of the journal of his adventures that was published in 1646 under the title Journael ofte gedenckwaerdige beschrijvinge van de Oost-Indische reyse van Willem Ysbrantsz. Bontekoe van Hoorn, begrijpende veel wonderlijcke en gevaerlijcke saecken hem daer in wedervaren ("Journal or memorable description of the East Indian voyage of Willem Bontekoe from Hoorn, including many remarkable and dangerous things that happened to him there").

== Life ==
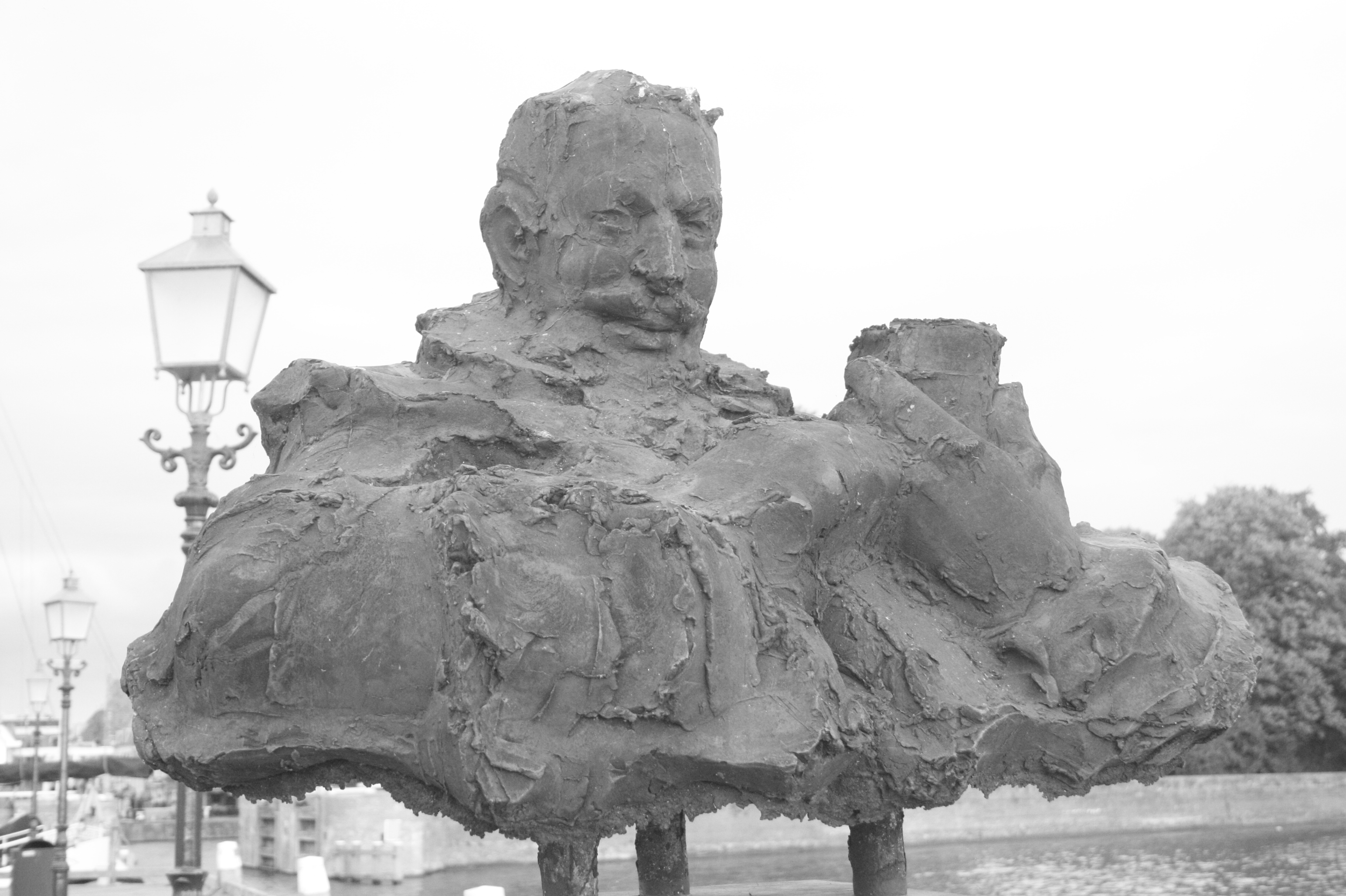
Statue of Willem Bontekoe, Hoorn harbour

Bontekoe was born in Hoorn in Holland. In 1607, at the age of twenty, Bontekoe succeeded his father as captain of the ship Bontekoe. Ten years later, in 1617, the ship was taken by Barbary pirates and Bontekoe ended up at a slave market. He was bought free, but his ship was lost.

In 1618 Bontekoe enlisted in the service of the Dutch East India Company. On a voyage to Java he was shipwrecked, along with part of his crew, and continued in a lifeboat. After a grueling journey, including an attack by hostile natives on Sumatra, they reached Batavia on Java. Bontekoe was given a new command and an order to harass the Chinese coast.

In 1625 Bontekoe returned to Holland. After his return, he settled down in Hoorn to live a quiet life. On March 1, 1626, at the age of 38, Bontekoe married Eeltje Bruijnes.

== Journal ==
Bontekoe might have been forgotten had he not written his journal (see above). This book is about his voyage with the Nieuw Hoorn, the shipwreck, the adventurous voyage to Java in lifeboats, and his subsequent years of service in East Asia. It was first printed by Hoorn printer Jan Deutel, a Protestant member of the Chamber of rhetoric who heavily edited Bontekoe's prose; Bontekoe is described as a "writer of little talent". The book is illustrated with etchings and was a bestseller in the 17th and 18th centuries: before 1800, sixty editions and many translations had been published, and it was republished a number of times in the 19th and 20th centuries. Deutel had molded Bontekoe's journal into a highly fashionable form that combined adventure, disaster, and religion to make a book with educational and literary appeal.

Bontekoe set out from Texel on December 28, 1618 as skipper of the Nieuw Hoorn ("New Hoorn"), an East Indiaman (i.e. an armed merchant ship). His destination was the town of Bantam on Java. The merchant Hein Rol had formally the upper command.

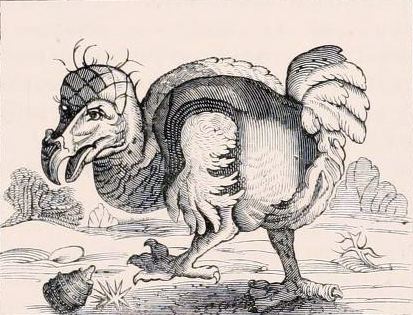
1646 etching of a dodo Bontekoe claimed to have seen on Réunion. It was based on a sketch by Roelant Savery

After passing the coast of Brazil, at the end of May 1619 the ship passed Cape Hope, where it did not stop due to the weather. Instead it stayed for 21 days in Réunion and 9 days at Île Sainte-Marie near the coast of Madagascar. It departed from there on 8 September. The ship sailed alone through the Indian Ocean. By then 17 of the 216 crew members had died.

A fire, caused by a shipmate accidentally setting fire to a cask of brandy, caused the gunpowder magazine to explode and sink the ship. Of the 119 still on the ship only two survived, including Bontekoe, but he was wounded. Seventy more had escaped before the sinking in two lifeboats. They continued in the two boats; later they went on together in one. Sails were made from the shirts of the crew. They were hungry and thirsty, some drank seawater or urine. Bontekoe did the latter too, until it became too concentrated. Sometimes there was relief by being able to catch birds and flying fish, and by rain supplying drinking water. The hunger became so severe again that the crew decided to kill the ship boys; Bontekoe writes that he was against that, and that they agreed that they would wait three more days. Just in time, 13 days after the ship wreck, they reached land where they could eat coconuts. It was an island in the Sunda Strait, 15 miles off Sumatra.

They went on to Sumatra, where they encountered locals from whom they could first buy food, but who later attacked them. Eleven crew members were killed, and four had to be abandoned; they had probably also been killed.

In the end, 55 survivors reached Batavia, after encountering a Dutch fleet of 23 ships near Java under the command of Frederik de Houtman, which saved them from going to the now-hostile Bantam. Divided over the ships they got to Batavia on Java, where Bontekoe and Rol were received by Jan Pieterszoon Coen, who gave Bontekoe a new command and an order to harass the Chinese coast. He narrowly survived a hurricane, and returned to Hoorn a wealthy man. He became a trader, and twenty years after his return published his journal.

== The Cabin Boys of Bontekoe (book) ==
The first part of the journal became the basis of a very popular children's book by author Johan Fabricius, De Scheepsjongens van Bontekoe (1924), in which four teenage boys in the crew play the central roles. The book was the basis of a film adaptation released in 2007. The city of Hoorn has a statue of Hajo, Rolf, and Padde on the quay wall.

In 1995 and 1996, on the occasion of the 350th anniversary of the journal's publication, a new edition, an edited collection of essays, and an annotated bibliography were published.

== Editions and scholarly studies ==
- Bontekoe, Willem Ysbrandz. Die vier und zwantzigste Schiffahrt, 1648. Frankfurt/Main ed., facsimile ed., 1993, introd. by Augustus J. Veenendaal, Jr., Scholars' Facsimiles & Reprints, ISBN 978-0-8201-1485-9.
- ---, Iovrnael ofte gedenkwaerdige beschrij vinghe; De wonderlijke avonturen van een schipper in de Oost 1618-1625. Ed. V.D. Roeper. Amsterdam: Terra Incognita, 1996. ISBN 9073853087.
- Bostoen, Karel, Remmelt Daalder, Vibeke Roeper, Garreit Verhoeven, and Diederick Wildeman. Bontekoe; De schipper, het journaal, de scheepsjongens. Zutphen; Amsterdam: Walburg Pers, Nederlands Scheepvaartmuseum, 1996. ISBN 9060119487.
- Verhoeven, Garreit and Piet Verkruijsse (eds.), Iovrnael ofte Gedenk waerdige beschrijvinghe van de Oost-Indische Reyse van Willem Ysbrantsz. Bontekoe van Hoorn; Descriptieve bibliografie 1646-1996. Zutphen: Walburg Pers, 1996. ISBN 9060119479.
