= The Sinister Man (novel) =

1924 novel by Edgar Wallace

- Author: Edgar Wallace
- Language: English
- Genre: Thriller
- Publication date: 1924
- Publication place: United Kingdom
- Media type: Print

The Sinister Man is a 1924 thriller novel by the British writer Edgar Wallace.

== Adaptation ==
In 1960 it was turned into the film The Sinister Man directed by Clive Donner as part of a long-running series of Wallace films made at Merton Park Studios.

== Bibliography ==
- Goble, Alan. The Complete Index to Literary Sources in Film. Walter de Gruyter, 1999.
