= Java Ho! =

1924 juvenile fiction novel by Dutch author Johan Fabricius

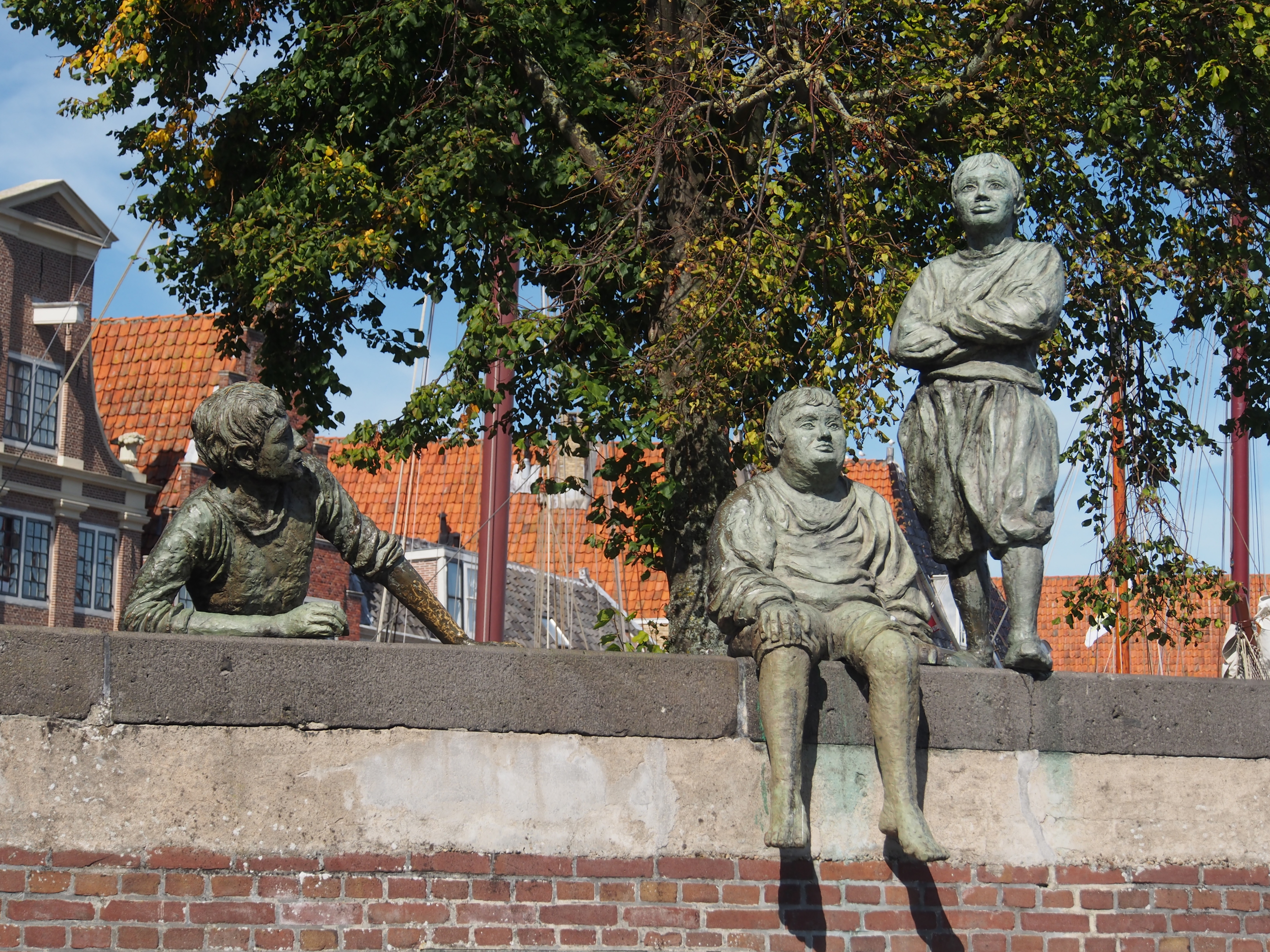
Statues of Bontekoe's cabin boys in Hoorn, Netherlands

Java Ho!: The Adventures of Three Boys Amid Fire, Storm and Shipwreck (Dutch: De Scheepsjongens van Bontekoe, lit. 'The Shipboys of Bontekoe') is a juvenile fiction novel by Dutch author Johan Fabricius, first published in 1924.

The book was the basis for a movie of the same name released in 2007. The events in the book are loosely based on the journal (first published in 1646) of Dutch captain Willem Bontekoe (1587–1657) and concern three young boys, Hajo, Ralf, and Padde, who have sailed to the Dutch East Indies aboard the Nieuw Hoorn. Due to an accident caused by Padde the ship is wrecked, leaving the boys to fend for themselves in the East.

== Background ==
Fabricius's story was based on the actual logbook of 17th-century captain Willem Bontekoe (Hoorn, 1587–1657), detailing Bontekoe's journey to the Dutch East Indies between 1618 and 1625. During that trip one of the crew dropped a lit candle into a cask of brandy, which caused a fire that ultimately made the powder kegs explode. Fifty-five sailors, including the captain, survived and reached Batavia; Bontekoe managed to get home via China, almost being shipwrecked once more along the way. He returned to Hoorn, which he never left again; his journal became a bestseller.

Fabricius was alerted to Bontekoe's book by his father, Jan, also a writer, and added the three young heroes to the narrative.

== Plot ==
Peter Hajo and Padde Kelemeijn, two poor fourteen-year old boys living in Hoorn, make friends with Rolf, who is the nephew of Willem Bontekoe. Hajo's father was a fisherman who drowned, and Hajo works as a blacksmith's apprentice but longs to go to sea. He signs up with Bontekoe, to sail to the East along with Rolf. The ship sails from Texel, but Padde, who has come along to say goodbye, misses the ship home and becomes a sailor as well, apprenticed to the master in charge of food and drink.

Off the Sumatra coast Padde knocks a candle over and starts a fire. The ship explodes, and the survivors manage to reach the coast, where they are waylaid by natives. The three boys, with Harmen, another sailor, set off to reach the Dutch colony of Batavia. Here their ways part; Rolf stays with his uncle in Asia, while the other two boys sail back home. With presents and a bag full of earned money they return to their mothers and siblings.

== Legacy ==
Though initial sales were slow, it became Fabricius's best-known book. Between 1924 and 1996, the book went through 21 editions and sold 250,000 copies. The book was also the first children's book published by publisher Leopold. An English translation was published as Java Ho! The Adventures of Four Boys Amid Fire, Storm, and Shipwreck. In the city of Hoorn, statues of the three boys made by Jan van Druten in 1968, are on the quay, looking out seaward. A television production (a reading by Coen Flink) aired in the 1970s; a movie premiered in November 2007. A comic version, with illustrations by Piet Wijn and text by Frans Jacobs, was published in 1996. In 2003, historian Gert J. Oostindie commented that the book, for so long a children's classic, was "perhaps in its dying days".

In the English version some adjustments have been made compared to the Dutch version. Some passages which could be considered racist or too violent have been removed; an example is the modification of a chapter in which the sailors eat in a Chinese restaurant in Batavia, where they drink too much and misbehave.
