= Marriage of Convenience (1960 film) =

British crime film by Clive Donner

- Directed by: Clive Donner
- Written by: Robert Banks Stewart
- Based on: The Three Oak Mystery by Edgar Wallace
- Produced by: Jack Greenwood; Jim O'Connolly
- Starring: John Cairney; Harry H. Corbett; John Van Eyssen
- Cinematography: Brian Rhodes
- Edited by: Bernard Gribble
- Music by: Francis Chagrin
- Production company: Merton Park Studios
- Distributed by: Anglo-Amalgamated
- Release date: November 1960
- Running time: 58 minutes
- Country: United Kingdom
- Language: English

Marriage of Convenience is a 1960 British crime film directed by Clive Donner and starring Harry H. Corbett, John Cairney and John Van Eyssen. The screenplay was by Robert Banks Stewart, based on the 1924 Edgar Wallace novel The Three Oak Mystery. It is part of the series of Edgar Wallace Mysteries films made at Merton Park Studios from 1960 to 1965.

== Plot ==
A convict escapes from jail, only to discover that his girlfriend has married the police officer who arrested him.

== Cast ==
- Harry H. Corbett as Inspector Bruce
- John Cairney as Larry
- John Van Eyssen as John Mandle
- Jennifer Daniel as Barbara Blair
- Moira Redmond as Tina
- Russell Waters as Sam Spencer
- Trevor Reid as Superintendent Carver
- Howard Goorney as onion seller
- Alexander Archdale as governor
- Geoffrey Denton as uniformed inspector
- Patrick Ludlow as registrar
- Barry MacLean as 1st warder
- Basil Beale as 2nd warder
- Alex Scott as Vic Ellis
- Patricia Burke as woman in the apartment
- Pauline Shepherd as Evie Martin
- Leila Williams as secretary
- Duncan Burns as garage apprentice
- Trevor Maskell as Sergeant Collins

== Release ==
Marriage of Convenience was the first of the Edgar Wallace series to be allocated to the Rank circuit for general release. It went out as support for Man in the Moon (1960) from January 15, 1961.

== Critical reception ==
The Monthly Film Bulletin wrote: "Altogether a disappointing addition to Merton Park's new Edgar Wallace series, in that Clive Donner's surprisingly stiff, journeyman style of direction provides nothing to compensate for the generally amateurish level of performance and writing."

Robert Murphy wrote: "Clive Donner's Marriage of Convenience and The Sinister Man are very stylish, and clearly marked him out for higher things."
