= Abismoj =

1923 novel by Jean Forge

- Author: Jean Forge
- Original title: Abismoj
- Language: Esperanto
- Genre: Romance novel
- Publication date: 1923; 1973 Helsinki; 2024 New York
- Media type: Print (Paperback)
- Pages: 150 pp

Abismoj (English: Abysses) is a 1923 novel written by Jean Forge, the first he wrote originally in Esperanto. It describes and profoundly analyzes conflicts in the soul. Already there appear the greatest strengths of Forge's work, the original form, the figures themselves speak about themselves and about their problems; the form and the inventive narration style give this work important significance in Esperanto literature:

The core of this novel is a daily repeating story, but Forge is able with his masterful pen to make it interesting to the last word ... Strikingly clear style, popularly deep psychology and in absolutely classical Esperanto. (Jobo, Literatura Mondo 1923, p. 140).

== Contents ==
The novel uses a frame narrative, and the main plot of the story is said to be written based on the visions the unlucky author (in the story outside the main plot) saw while being captivated in the magic of an Indian monk. Ernesto Muŝko (pron. Mushko) behaved badly indulging in alcoholism and women going around cafes and spent all his wealth on his indulgence, leaving him huge amount of debt as a result. A means of salvation suddenly appears: to marry Halino Borki, the sole daughter of a rich neighbor who through boredom and a yearning for love at first accepts his proposal. Mateo Ardo, an orphan, has been educated with Zonjo, and they get engaged. But Mateo by chance, having arrived at Mr. Borki's house, appeals to his daughter and is almost seduced by her. Muŝko burns his house in despair after confusing the landlord with Ardo, while Mateo manages to escape from the sinful passion and return to his first love.

== Main characters ==
- Ernesto Muŝko, country estate owner in Karlovo
- Halino Borki, daughter of a neighboring country estate owner in Nivi
- Mateo Ardo, art painter
- Zonjo Biringo, his fiancée

== Adaptation for the theater ==
The novel was adapted by Arno Lagrange for the theater under the title Trajna sonĝo (~Train dream) and offered for an international production at the 72nd World Convention of Esperanto in Warsaw in 1987. The production however did not take place.

== Sources ==
- The first version of this article is a translation from the article "Abismoj" in Esperanto Wikipedia.
- Concise Encyclopedia of the Original Literature of Esperanto, 1887-2007 by Geoffrey Sutton · 2008
