= Luxemburger Illustrierte =

Newspaper published in Luxembourg between 1924 and 1933

- Founded: 1924
- Ceased publication: 1933
- Language: German

Luxemburger Illustrierte was a newspaper published in Luxembourg between 1924 and 1931.
