= Margaret Wylie =

Western Australian author

Margaret Wylie (1869 or 1870 – 8 October 1955) was a Western Australian author and teacher of home economics. Wylie headed the domestic science branch of the Department of Education (Western Australia), and wrote the Golden Wattle Cookery Book, first published in Perth, Western Australia in 1924.

In 1923 Wylie had been in charge of the household science teaching in Western Australia for eight years, responsible for 28 centres and 3000 pupils, and was considered an expert in domestic science by The Daily News newspaper in Perth.

In September 1931, Wylie officially opened Phoebe's School of Domestic Arts at 882 Hay Street, the first privately run domestic arts school in Australia. She retired in December that year, having spent seventeen years in her position at the Education Department, overseen the growth in popularity of domestic sciences, and an increase from 16 to 33 teaching centres.

Wylie was a radio broadcaster for 6WF in the 1930s, presenting a talk show from at least 1933 to 1936. She died in 1955, at the age of 85. In her obituary, the Golden Wattle Cookery Book was described as "now a by-word in home science centres and also in homes throughout Australia.

Wylie was included in the 1978 book Reflections: profiles of 150 women who helped make Western Australia's history.
