= History of Aurangzib =

Book in five volumes by Jadunath Sarkar

History of Aurangzib is a book in five volumes by Indian historian Jadunath Sarkar about the Mughal ruler Aurangzeb.

The book is considered to be the magnum opus of Jadunath Sarkar and was written between 1912 and 1924. It has been called the most authoritative account of Aurangzeb.

== Bibliography ==
- Sreedharan, E. (2004). A Textbook of Historiography, 500 B.C. to A.D. 2000. Orient Longman.
