= Jadunath Sarkar =

Indian historian (1870–1958)

Sir Jadunath Sarkar CIE FRAS
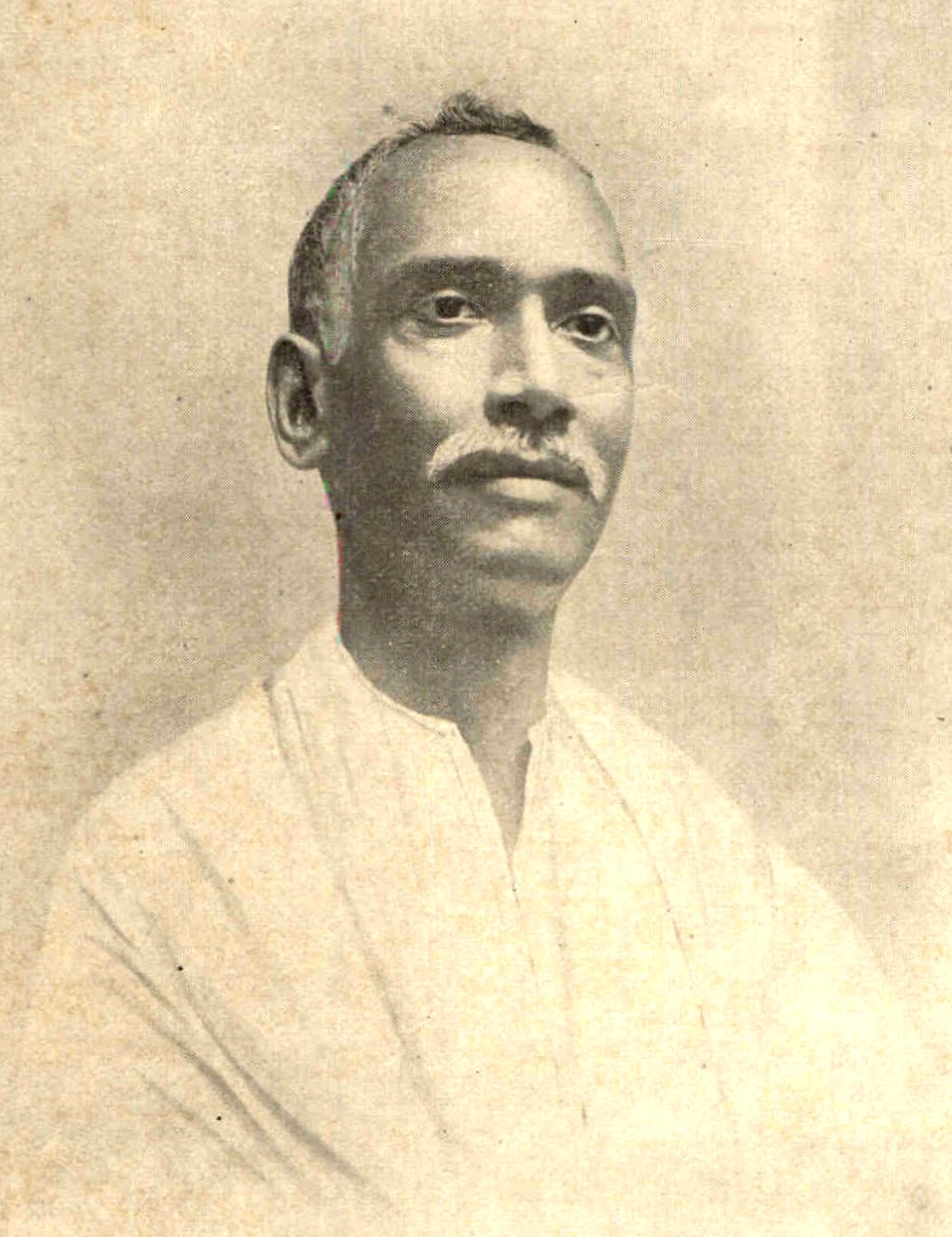
- Sarkar, 1927
- Born: 10 December 1870; Karachmaria, Bengal Presidency, British India
- Died: 19 May 1958 (aged 87); Calcutta, West Bengal, India
- Occupation: Historian
- Spouse: Lady Kadambini Sarkar

Sir Jadunath Sarkar, CIE, FRAS (10 December 1870 – 19 May 1958) was a prominent Indian historian and a specialist on the Mughal dynasty.

Sarkar was educated in English literature and worked as a teacher for some time but later shifted his focus to history research writing. He had vast knowledge of the Persian language, and he wrote all his books in English. He was vice-chancellor (VC) of the University of Calcutta from 1926 to 1928 and a member of the Bengal Legislative Council between 1929 and 1932. In 1929 the British knighted him.

== Early life and education ==
Sarkar was born on 10 December 1870 in Bengali kayastha family to village of Karachmaria in Chhatardighi, Singra, Rajshahi district, Bengal Presidency (now in Natore District, Bangladesh). His father, Rajkumar Sarkar, was a local zamindar and owned a large library. His mother, Harisundari Devi, had seven sons and three daughters, with Jadunath being the fifth child and third son. In 1891, he graduated in English from Presidency College, Calcutta. In 1892, he topped the Master of Arts examination in English at Calcutta University, and in 1897, he received the Premchand-Roychand Scholarship.

== Academic career ==
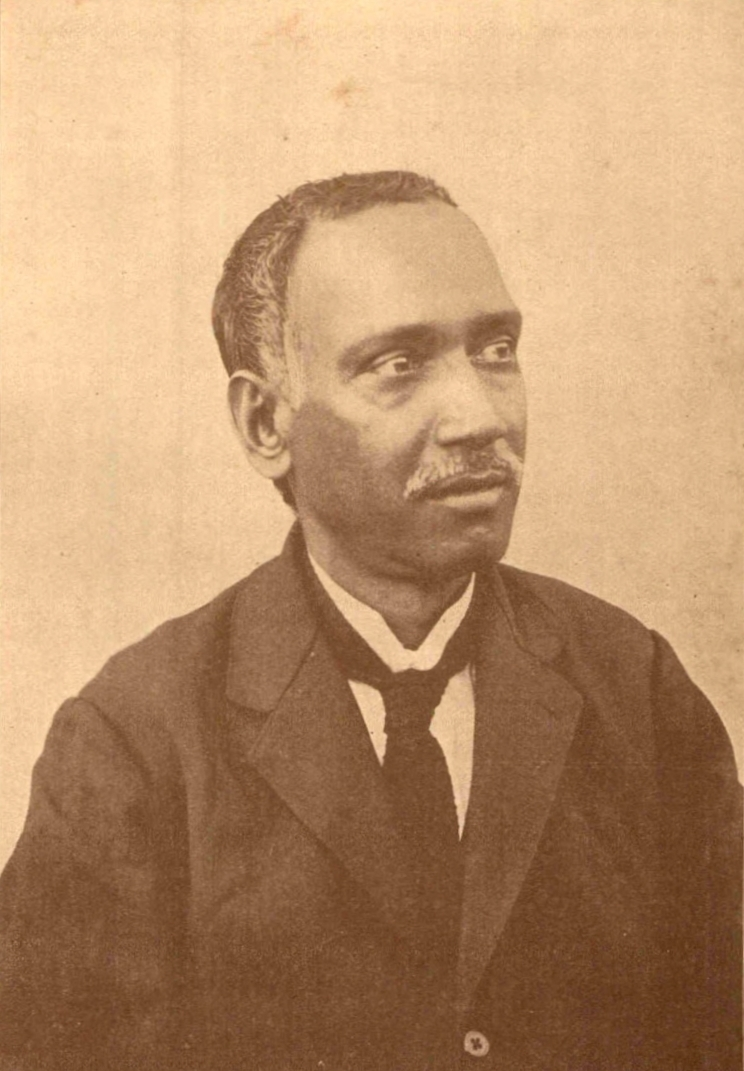
c. 1926

In 1893, he was inducted as a faculty member of English literature at Ripon College, Calcutta (later renamed Surendranath College). In 1898, he was appointed to Presidency College, Calcutta, after getting selected in the Provincial Education Services. In between, from 1917 to 1919, he taught modern Indian history at Benaras Hindu University, and from 1919 to 1923, both English and history at Ravenshaw College, Cuttack. In 1923, he became an honorary member of the Royal Asiatic Society of London. In August 1926, he was appointed as the vice-chancellor of Calcutta University. In 1928, he joined as Sir W. Meyer Lecturer in Madras University.

== Historiography ==
=== The Mughal decline debate ===
Sarkar explained the disintegration of the Mughal Empire after the death of Aurangzeb in 1707. This is one of his most influential and most widely debated arguments in the historiography of Mughal India and Aurangzeb. He wrote a five volume History of Aurangzib (1912-1924) and his four-volume Fall of the Mughal Empire (1932-38), it attributes the empire's collapse principally to the personal character and religious policy of its rulers rather than to institutional causes. Sarkar held Aurangzeb primarily responsible arguing that it was his religious intolerance towards Hindus that provoked a "Hindu reaction"that widened the divide between the two communities. Sarkar said that the fall of both the Mughal empire and Maratha power that followed it as the result of a "rottenness at the core of India society". Historians at Aligarh Muslim University challenged this account from the last 1950s, relocating the cause of decline. Satish Chandra, M.Athar Ali and Irfan Habib, who all belong to the Marxist historiography school traced the collapse to fiscal crisis instead.

=== Reception ===
He has been called the "greatest Indian historian of his time" and one of the greatest in the world, whose erudite works "have established a tradition of honest and scholarly historiography" by E. Sreedharan. He has also been compared with Theodor Mommsen and Leopold von Ranke. Arthur Llewellyn Basham calls him "the greatest Indian historian of his generation." He has also been described as "a star historian of modern India on medieval Indian history, who brilliantly caught the spirit of the age and devoted himself to the neglected field of Indian historiography." He has also been appreciated as "unquestionably the greatest Indian historian of his time and one of the greatest in the world".

Sarkar's historiography was inclined towards nationalist elements. His works faded out of public memory with the increasing advent of Marxist and postcolonial schools of historiography.

Academically, Jos J. L. Gommans compares Sarkar's work with those of the Aligarh historians, noting that while the historians from the Aligarh worked mainly on the mansabdari system and gunpowder technology in the Mughal Empire, Sarkar concentrated on military tactics and sieges. In a letter dated 25 November 1945 to historian Raghubir Sinh of Sitamau, Sarkar says, "Aurangzib is my life's work; Shivaji is only an incidental off-shoot of it."

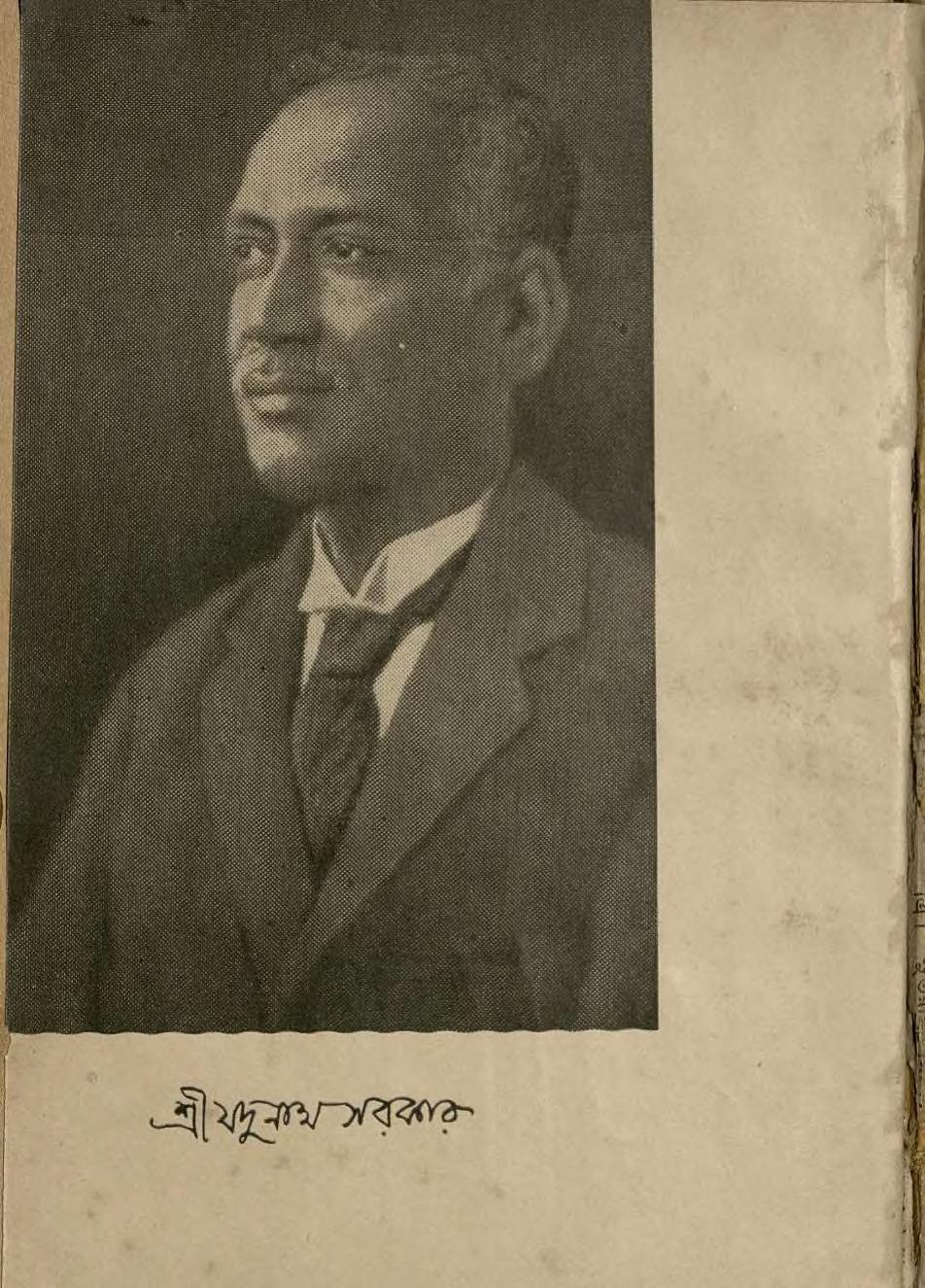
Jadunath Sarkar

== Honours ==
In 1904, Sarkar was given the Griffith Prize by the University of Calcutta (Kolkata, Bengal). He was elected as a member of the Indian Historical Records Commission in 1919. In 1923, he was made an Honorary Member of the Royal Asiatic Society of Great Britain and Ireland (Hon. MRAS) and Honorary Fellow of the Royal Asiatic Society of Bengal (Hon. FRASB).

Sarkar was appointed a Companion of the Order of the Indian Empire (CIE) in the 1926 New Year Honours and knighted in the 1929 Birthday Honours by King George V, then also Emperor of India. On 22 August 1929, he was invested with his knighthood at Simla by the acting Viceroy of India, George Goschen, 2nd Viscount Goschen.

In 1935, he became a corresponding member of the Royal Historical Society (London, England) and an honorary member of the American Historical Association (Washington, D.C., US). In 1936 he received an honorary D.Litt. degree from the University of Dhaka and in 1944 from the University of Patna. When he reached his eightieth year, he was honoured in 1949 and 1950 by the literary associations Bangiya Sahitya Parishat and the Bangiya Itihas Parishad (both in Kolkata, West Bengal) for his lifetime achievements.

== Legacy ==
The Centre for Studies in Social Sciences, Calcutta, an autonomous research center, has been established in his house, which was donated to the state government by Sarkar's wife. CSSC also houses the Jadunath Bhavan Museum and Resource Centre, a museum-cum-archive of primary sources.

== List of works ==
Published works by Sarkar include:

- Economics of British India (1900)
- The India of Aurangzib (1901)
- Anecdotes of Aurangzib (1912)
- History of Aurangzib (in 5 volumes), (1912–24)
- Chaitanya's pilgrimages and teachings, from his contemporary Bengali biography, the Chaitanya-charit-amrita: Madhya-lila (translation from the Bengali original by Krishnadasa Kaviraja, 1913)
- Shivāji and his times (1919)
- Studies in Mughal India (1919)
- Mughal Administration (1920)
- Nadir Shah in India (1922)
- Later Mughals by William Irvine (in 2 volumes), (edited by Jadunath Sarkar, 1922)
- India through the ages (1928)
- A Short History of Aurangzib (1930)
- The Fall of the Mughal Empire (in 4 volumes), (1932–38)
- Studies in Aurangzib's reign (1933)
- The House of Shivaji (1940)
- The History of Bengal (in 2 volumes), (1943–1948)
- Maāsir-i-ʻĀlamgiri: a history of the emperor Aurangzib-ʻl̀amgir (translation from the Persian original by Muḥammad Sāqī Mustaʻidd Khān, 1947)
- Military History of India (1960)
- A History of Jaipur, c. 1503–1938 (1984)
- A History Of Dasnami Naga Sanyasis

== Sources ==
- Chakrabarty, Dipesh (2015). The Calling of History: Sir Jadunath Sarkar and His Empire of Truth. Chicago and London: University of Chicago Press. ISBN 978-0-226-10044-9.
