= Golden Wattle Cookery Book =

1924 book by Margaret A Wylie

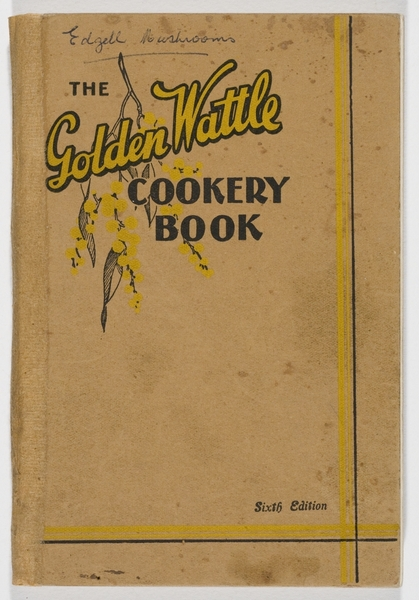
- 6th edition (1937)
- Author: Margaret A Wylie
- Language: English
- Subject: Cooking
- Published: 1924
- Publication place: Australia
- Media type: Print (hardcover)
- Pages: 200
- OCLC: 219860048

The Golden Wattle Cookery Book is a popular Australian recipe book which was first published in Perth, Western Australia in 1924.

== Authors ==
The book was compiled by Margaret Wylie and the teaching staff of the Perth Household Management Centre. Other Centre staff who contributed to the book include Mabel E. Yewers, Margaret H. Reeves, Doris S. Gray and Marie A. McKinnon.

== Contents ==
The book contains simple and easy to follow recipes, such as barley water, fricassee of chicken, and jam tarts. It also has hints and helpful advice on what to look for when buying and preparing fresh produce.

== Versions ==
The book has been reprinted 27 times. Versions include the 1930 third edition (240 pages, published by E.S. Wigg & Son); and the 1942 eighth edition (280 pages).

== Publication history ==
- 1924, Australia, E.S. Wigg OCLC 219860048, 200 pages
- 1975, Australia, E.S. Wigg OCLC 221950040, 262 pages, 22nd edition with metric conversion
- 2003, Australia, Angus & Robertson ISBN 9780207180729, 262 pages, 34th edition

== See also ==
- Australian cuisine
- The English and Australian Cookery Book
