= Nikolai Ushin =

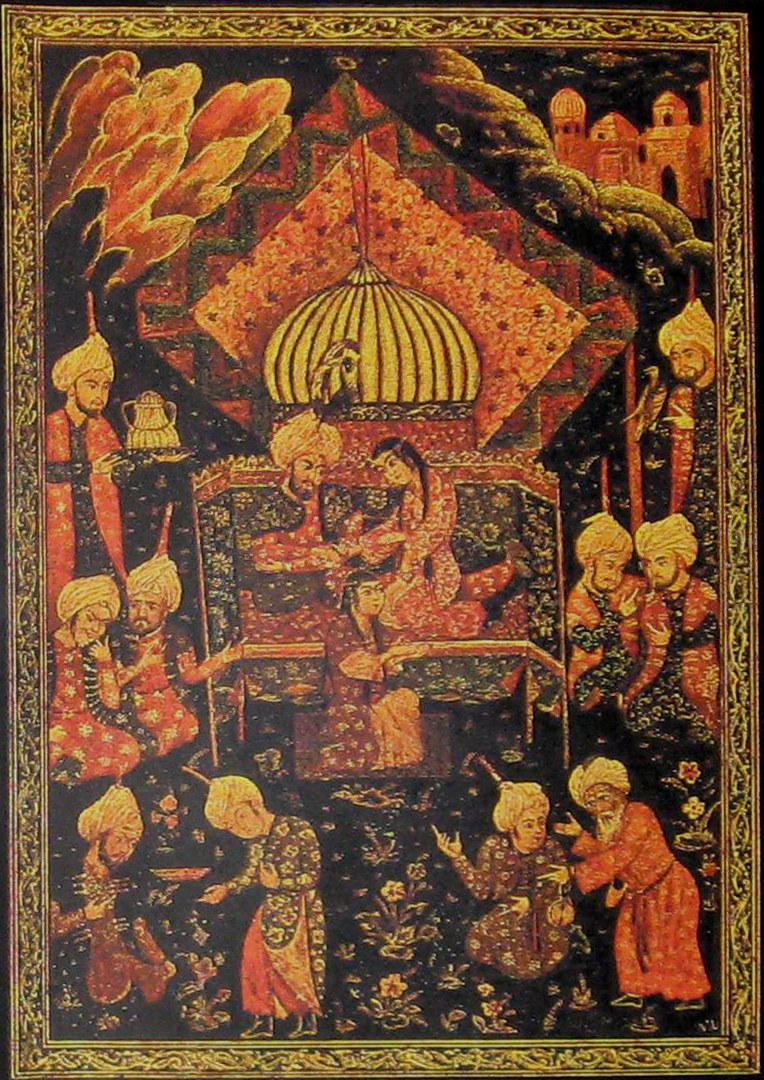
Cover illustration by Ushin for the 2nd volume of One Thousand and One Nights

Nikolai Alexeyevich Ushin (Russian: Николай Алексеевич Ушин, 1898 – 6 April 1942) was a Soviet graphic artist, theatre designer and book illustrator.

Born in Saint Petersburg, Ushin studied in the Academy of Fine Arts in 1923–1928. In the 1920s Ushin began designing theatrical decorations for scenic performances. He creatively adapted the themes of medieval Russian painting and Palekh miniature. Ushin in particular illustrated the Russian translation of One Thousand and One Nights published in eight volumes by Academia. His illustrations for One Thousand and One Nights were awarded a gold medal at the 1937 Paris Exposition. Ushin also made lithographs and bookplates. He died in besieged Leningrad in 1942 (as his brother, graphic artist and book illustrator Aleksey Ushin). Ushin's works are kept in several Saint Petersburg museums. His nephew, Andrey Ushin also became a graphic artist.

== See also ==
- List of Soviet poster artists
- Photomontage
- Constructivism (art)
