= Johan Fabricius =

Dutch writer, journalist and adventurer

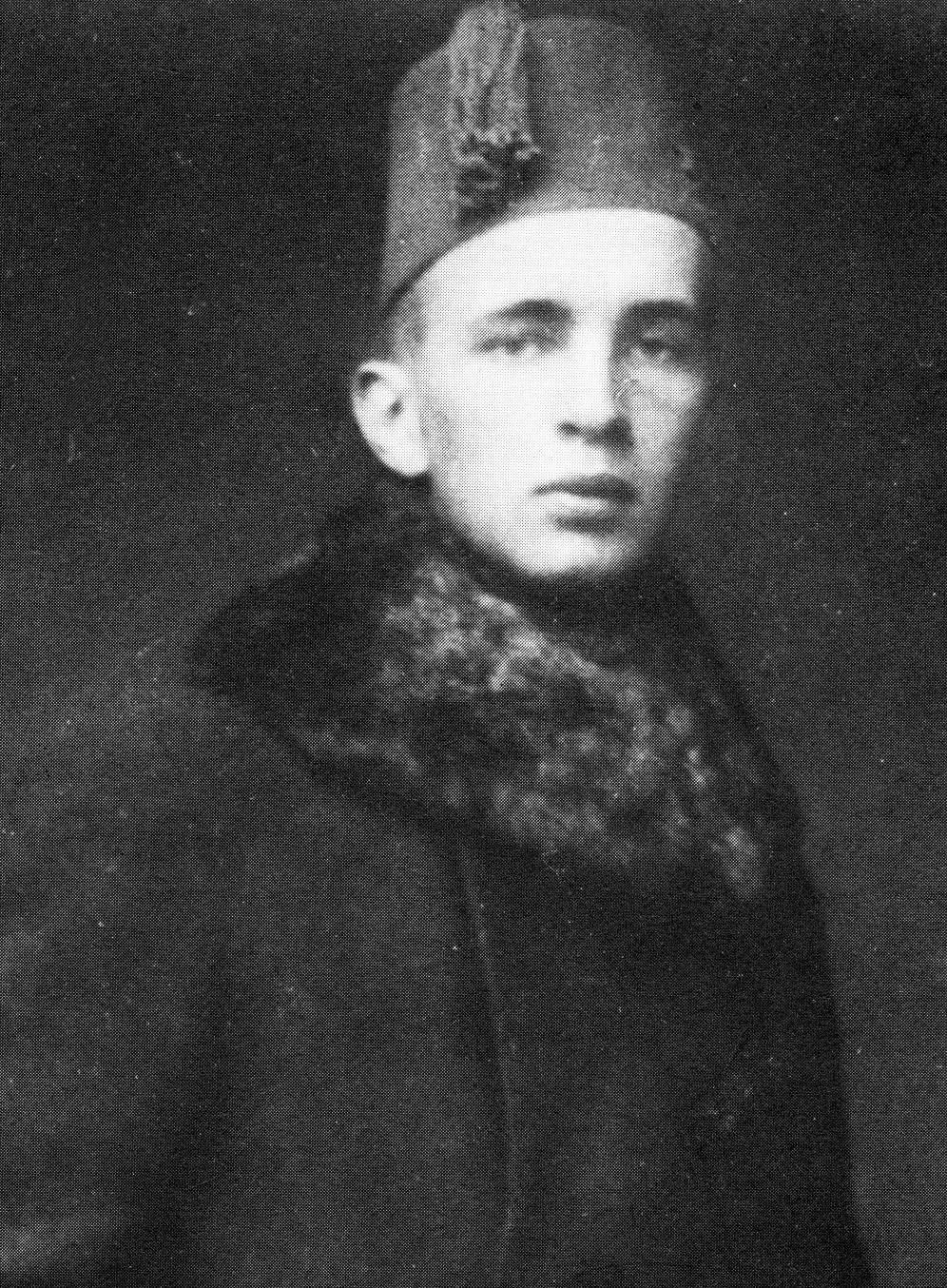
Fabricius at the Italian front (1915)

Johan Johannes Fabricius (24 August 1899 – 21 June 1981), who published in English as Johan Wigmore Fabricius, was a Dutch writer, journalist and adventurer.

Fabricius was born in Bandung, Java. He wrote approximately 60 books, among them many books for children, including De Scheepsjongens van Bontekoe (1924), which was reprinted 28 times as of 2003.

== Biography ==
Johan Fabricius was born in Bandung, Dutch East Indies, to Jan Fabricius and Minke Dornseiffen. His father was a journalist and playwright, which facilitated Johan's entry into the arts. He was a tall man, and had an aptitude for various arts. Until the age of fourteen he spent most of his time in the Dutch East Indies (ten years in all) and would return for brief visits throughout his life, maintaining a strong connection to the area.

His schooling was varied; he was educated in different places in the Indies and the Netherlands, and briefly in Paris, and in the fall of 1914 he enrolled in the Hogere Burgerschool in The Hague, but soon left for the Academie van Beeldende Kunsten, where he showed a great talent for portraits, later illustrating his own books. The success of the series "De wondere avonturen van Arretje Nof," a series of five books advertising for the Nederlandsche Oliefabrieken (since 1928 part of Unilever), was due in part to his illustrations. In 1925 he married Ruth Freudenburg, and they had three children.

After his years in The Hague, Fabricius joined the Austrian army as a war painter. He spent a few months on the Pavia front, where mostly Bosnian soldiers were engaged with Italian troops. Some of his letters home were published in the literary magazine De Gids. In 1922 he managed to get Eiko van den Reigerhof, his first novel, published; it had been written a few years earlier. By that time Fabricius was trying his hand as an illustrator, painter, stage actor, and costume designer. Following in his father's footsteps he wrote plays, some of which were actually staged.

His breakthrough as a writer was Het meisje met de blauwe hoed, a comedic novel about a soldier's life, based on his own experiences in the military. The book was a commercial success, and was adapted for a movie in 1934; in 1974 it was adapted to a musical for television. His De scheepsjongens van Bontekoe (1923) was to become his best-known book; based on the real-life experiences of a 17th-century Dutch captain, Willem Bontekoe, who was shipwrecked on the way to the Indies, it became a best-seller after a slow start. The three fictional characters who set sail with Bontekoe allowed for easy identification for a young audience; a statues of the three is in the harbor of Hoorn since 1968. This book was tuned into a national award-winning feature film in 2007. Having sold an estimated 300,000 copies, the 34th edition was published in 2016.

In between work Fabricius traveled widely. In 1922 already he had visited Argentina and Paraguay. His honeymoon was a one-year long journey along the shores of the Mediterranean, and he lived in Vienna and Capri. A journey around the world in 1936 brought him back to the Indies. His experiences and impressions formed the foundation for many of his novels, which combined drama with exoticism and unusual characters, in a relaxed style full of humor and anecdotes.

The 1930s found Fabricius at the height of popularity and creativity; he produced a best-selling picaresque trilogy set in 18th-century Italy, Komedianten trokken voorbij (1931, winner of the C.W. van der Hoogt award), Melodie der verten (1932), and De dans om de galg (1934).

When World War II broke out, Fabricius was living in Antwerp with his family, and fled to England by way of Saint-Malo. In London he worked for the Dutch news department of the BBC, first as a news reader and then as a free-lance correspondent. In the spring of 1945 he was sent to Asia as a correspondent for The Times and the BBC, hoping to witness the liberation of the Indies. In September 1945 he flew from Singapore to Batavia, and was one of the first foreign correspondents there. His recollections of a country ravaged by war and revolution were published in 1947 as Hoe ik Indië terugvond. At the end of 1945 he left, moving to the United Kingdom by way of French Indo-China, Japan, and the United States.

He lived in the UK until he moved permanently to the Netherlands in 1956. His wife died in 1968 and that same year he married Anna Cornelia Bleeker. He continued to travel and wrote at least one book a year until his death. By now his novels were frequently set in the Dutch Indies, with local subject matter. Much of his work was reprinted and translated, particularly for the US and UK markets.

According to I. Schöffer, by 1945 Fabricius had reached his peak. Before the war already he was on the fringe of the Dutch literary world and changing tastes (among critics) in the post-war period led to an evaluation of Fabricius as a writer of merely popular literature. In addition, his stories were thought to contain mostly flat characters and lacked variation (and were written in a much too expansive a style), certainly once exoticism was no longer in vogue. He remained optimistic, though, and continued to write and publish until his death (in Glimmen, 21 June 1981), still maintaining a broad readership. He was buried at the cemetery in the neighboring village of Noordlaren. Vandals stole the beautiful bronze wind vane, depicting the Nieuw Hoorn, an early 17th-century Dutch East-Indies sailing vessel (featured in his 1923 novel), from his grave.

== Bibliography ==
- "Eiko van de Reigershof" (1922) - His first book
- De Scheepsjongens van Bontekoe (1923) (translated as Java Ho!: The Adventures of Four Boys Amid Fire, Storm and Shipwreck) - Filmed in 2007
- Het meisje met de blauwe hoed (1927) (The girl with the blue hat) - Filmed in 1934 and in 1972
- Charlotte's groote reis (1928) (Charlotte's grand voyage)
- De wondere avonturen van Arretje Nof (1928) (The wondrous adventures of Arretje Nof) - For the Delftsche Slaolie Fabrieken.
- Mario Ferraro's ijdele liefde (1929)
- Komedianten trokken voorbij (1931)
- Melodie der verten (1932).
- De dans om de galg (1934) (The dance around the gallows).
- Leeuwen hongeren in Napels (1934). (The lions starve in Naples)
- Son of Marietta (1936)
- Eiland der demonen (1941) (Island of demons)
- A Castle in Carinthia (1941)
- Nacht over Java (1944) (Night over Java)
- De kraton (1945)
- Halfbloed (1947) (Halfblood)
- Java Revisited (1947)
- Hotel Vesuvius (1948)
- De grote geus (1949)
- Brandende Aarde: De Vernieling en Evacuatie van de Olieterreinen in Nederlandsch-Indië (1949)
- The Great Ordeal (1951)
- Mijn huis staat achter de kim (1951)
- A Dutchman at large: Memoirs (1952)
- Een wereld in beroering (1952)
- Gordel van smaragd (1953)
- Setoewo, de tijger (1956) (Setoewo, the tigre)
- Mortal pageant: A romance of the year of the Great Plague in Florence (1956)
- Luie stoel (1957) (Lazy chair)
- Schimmenspel (1958)
- De heilige paarden (1959) (The sacred horses)
- Jongensspel (1963) (Boy's play)
- Nacht zonder zegen (1963) (Night without blessing)
- Herinneringen van een oude pruik (1963) (Memories of an old wig)
- Hopheisa, in regen en wind (1964)
- Weet je nog, Yoshi? (1966) (Do you still remember, Yoshi?)
- Dag, Leidseplein (1968) (Goodbye, Leidseplein)
- Wij Tz'e Hsi, keizerin van China (1968)
- Wittebroodsweken met Mama (1969)
- De paradijsklok (1971)
- Partnerruil niet uitgesloten (1972) (Swinging not excluded)
- Devil in the tower (1973)
- Het portret (1974) (The portrait)
- De oorlog van de kleine paardjes (1975) (The war of the little horses)
- Er zijn geen echte gekken meer op Capri (1976) (Really crazy people no longer exist at Capri Island)
- Gringo: een reis naar het Paraguay van 1922 (1976) (Gringo: A Voyage to the Paraguay of 1922)
- Toontje Poland: een Alkmaarse jongen in de dagen van Napoleon (1977)
- Toontje Poland onder de Tropenzon (1978)
- De schreeuw van de witte kakatoe (1978)
- Als vogelen uit de hemel...: nacht over Java (1980) (Like birds from heaven ...: night over Java)
- De bruiden in het bad en andere duistere daden (1981) (The bride in the bath and other dark deeds)
