= The Dream (novel) =

1924 novel by H. G. Wells

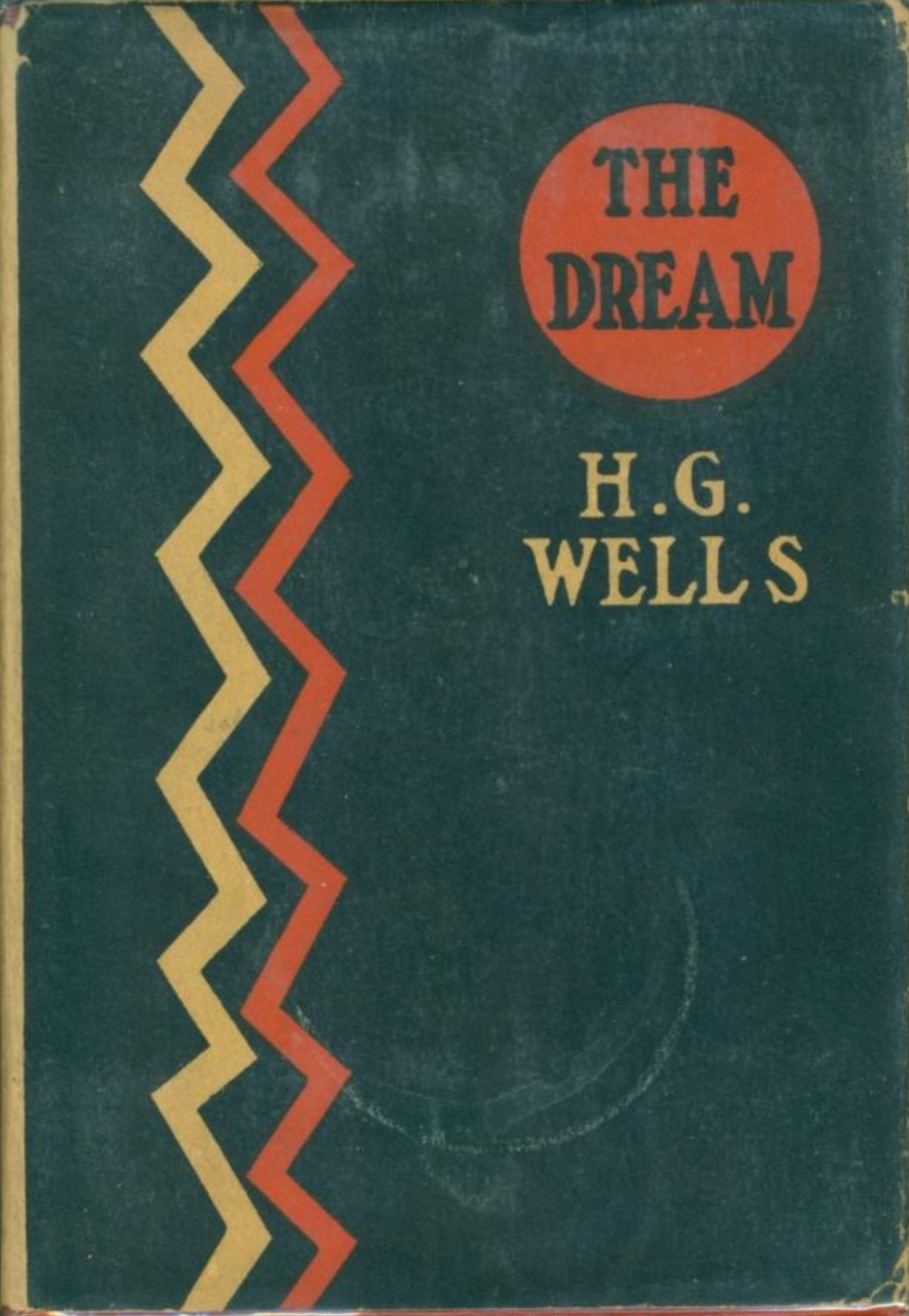
- First edition
- Author: H. G. Wells
- Illustrator: 'Horosho'
- Language: English
- Publisher: Jonathan Cape
- Publication date: 1924
- Publication place: United Kingdom
- Media type: Print (Hardbound and paperback)
- Pages: 320 pp

The Dream is a 1924 novel by H. G. Wells about a man from a Utopian future who dreams the entire life of an Englishman from the Victorian and Edwardian eras, Harry Mortimer Smith. As in other novels of this period, in The Dream Wells represents the present as an "Age of Confusion" from which humanity will be able to emerge with the help of science and common sense.

== Synopsis ==
In circa 4,000 A.D., a biologist named Sarnac is taking a holiday among mountains and lakes with his lover, Sunray. With four other holiday travellers, they visit some 2,000-year-old "ancient remains [of war dead] that had recently been excavated" in a nearby valley. A little later, after a brief afternoon nap, Sarnac awakens from "a very vivid dream." The rest of the novel consists of Sarnac's recounting of the dream, with occasional discussion of its particulars with his companions. Sarnac's dream brings with it total recall of the complete life of Harry Mortimer Smith. Smith's life and the institutions that structure it are the subject throughout the novel of a running commentary from the point of view of the achieved Utopia of 2,000 years later.

Harry Mortimer Smith was born in 1891 or 1892 in the fictional town of Cherry Gardens, in an area bordering the South Downs on the southern English coast. His father is a greengrocer who has trouble supporting his family because of the ignorance of birth control. He profits from the sale of produce from the nearby estate of Lord Bramble, where Harry Mortimer Smith's mother's brother, Uncle John Julip, works as head gardener.

Harry unwittingly exposes this theft when he is sent to work at Lord Bramble's estate, and as a result his uncle loses his job and comes to depend on the Smith household. Uncle John debauches Harry's weak-willed father, leading him to yield to the temptation to drink and bet on horses. The only person in the household that Harry esteems is his older sister Fanny, whom he helps run away to rejoin a lover in London. Harry's parents are scandalised by Fanny's sudden departure; shortly afterwards Smith père dies after being struck by an automobile.

Harry and his sister Prue go with their widowed mother to a boarding house in the central London district of Pimlico run by Matilda Good, a friend of the family. Wells was proud of some of the minor characters he sketched in this part of The Dream..

By chance, in London Harry reestablishes contact with his sister Fanny, who has become the kept woman of an important publisher. This connection enables Harry to gain employment at Thunderstone House and the publishing firm of Crane & Newberry, where his star is still rising at the end of his life. In this part of the novel Wells analyses the importance of and limitations of popular publishers in the years before the First World War.

The conclusion of The Dream is chiefly concerned with Harry Mortimer Smith's love life. Just before going to fight in France he meets Hetty Marcus, the daughter of a farmer. They marry, but when Harry discovers that Hetty has been unfaithful to him in his absence and is carrying another man's child, he divorces her—despite the fact that he is still deeply in love with her. Wells uses the occasion to comment on English sexual mores of the day: "We had no sexual education at all, only concealments and repressions. Our code was still the code of jealousy—thinly disguised. The pride and self-respect of a man was still bound up with the animal possession of women—the pride and self-respect of most women was by a sort of reflection bound up with the animal possession of a man. We felt that this possession was the keystone of life. Any failure in this central business involved a monstrous abasement, and against that our poor souls sought blindly for the most extravagant consolations. We hid things, we perverted and misrepresented things, we evade the issue."

Harry Mortimer Smith soon marries a woman who works at his place of business. They have a child, and his career prospers. But he becomes involved with Hetty again, and his life is abruptly ended in the early 1920s when he is murdered by Sumner, her jealous husband.

In an epilogue, Wells's characters discuss inconclusively the possibility of human immortality and the possibility of memories surviving death.

== World War I ==
Smith becomes a soldier fighting against the Germans in World War I:

Nowadays of course nobody reads the books of the generals and admirals and politicians of that time, and all the official war histories sleep the eternal sleep in the vaults of the great libraries, but probably you have all read one of two such human books as Enid Bagnold's '"Diary without Dates" or Cogswell's "Ermytage and the Curate" or Barbusse's "Le Feu" or Arthur Green's "Story of a Prisoner of War" or that curious anthology, "The War Stories of Private Thomas Atkins"; and probably you have seen photographs and films and also pictures painted by such men as Nevinson and Orpen and Muirhead Bone and Will Rothenstein. All of them, I can certify now, are very true books and pictures. They tell of desolation passing like the shadow of an eclipse across the human scene.
