= Anthony Wager =

English actor and television writer (1932–1990)

- Born: 24 June 1932; Willesden, London, England
- Died: 23 December 1990 (aged 58); Bali, Indonesia
- Education: Christ's College, Finchley
- Occupation(s): Actor, television writer
- Years active: 1946–1989

Anthony A. Wager (24 June 1932 – 23 December 1990) was an English actor and television writer. He is best known for portraying the role of the young Pip in David Lean's 1946 film of Great Expectations.

== Early life and career ==
Wager was born in Willesden, north London, and grew up in Mill Hill and Hendon. His father was a plumber and decorator. He studied at Christ's College, Finchley. In 1945, Wager auditioned for the role of young Pip in the film Great Expectations. He won the role and was praised by critics for his performance. He won a Film Daily Critics Award for Best Performance For a Juvenile for his role in the film.

After appearing in Great Expectations, Wager continued working in films and television in England. He often lived with the director Brian Desmond Hurst. In the late 1960s, Wager moved to Sydney, Australia, where he continued his career in both film and television but occasionally returned to England for acting jobs. He made his final onscreen appearance in the 1988 Australian television movie The Boardroom. Wager then moved to Bali, Indonesia, for health reasons.

== Death ==
On 23 December 1990, Wager died aged 58 in Bali.

== Partial filmography ==
- Great Expectations (1946) – Young Pip
- Hungry Hill (1947) – Young Wild Johnnie
- Fame Is the Spur (1947) – The Boy Hamer
- The Guinea Pig (1948) – Bert
- The Secret Tunnel (1948) – Roger Henderson
- No Place for Jennifer (1950) – Ted
- Scrooge (1951) – Fezziwig's Lad (uncredited)
- Above Us the Waves (1955) – George
- The Battle of the River Plate (1956) – Lookout, HMS Ajax (uncredited)
- The Wind Cannot Read (1958) – Moss
- The Captain's Table (1959) – Tony Millington (uncredited)
- Night of the Prowler (1962) – Det. Sgt. Baker
- Shadow of Fear (1964) – Jack Carter
- The Hi-Jackers (1963) – Smithy
- Be My Guest (1965) – Artie Clough
- Two Left Feet (1965) – Master of Ceremonies (uncredited)
- The Little Ones (1965) – (uncredited)
- Night Caller from Outer Space (1965) – Pvt. Higgins
- Silent Number (1974-75)
- Stir (1980) – Visiting Justice
- Daisy and Simon (1989) – Cuthbert (final film role)
