= Marianne Stone =

English actress (1922–2009)

- Stone with Peter Sellers in Lolita (1962)
- Born: 23 August 1922; Kings Cross, London, England
- Died: 21 December 2009 (aged 87); London, England
- Occupation: Actress
- Years active: 1943–1988
- Spouse: Peter Noble (m. 1947) (2 children)

Marianne Stone (23 August 1922 – 21 December 2009) was an English character actress. She performed in films from the early 1940s to the late 1980s, typically playing working class parts such as barmaids, secretaries and landladies. Stone appeared in nine of the Carry On films, and took part in an episode of the Carry On Laughing television series ("The Case of the Screaming Winkles"). She also had supporting roles with comedian Norman Wisdom.

== Film work ==
Stone also appeared in Brighton Rock (1947), Seven Days to Noon (1950), The 39 Steps (1959), Lolita (1962), Ladies Who Do (1963), Oh! What a Lovely War (1969) and the first two "Quatermass" films. Her most serious and arguably most dramatic role was as Lena van Broecken in three episodes of the BBC's Secret Army between 1977 and 1978.

Stone, whose nickname was "Mugsie", was credited in her early films under the name "Mary Stone", and also has been credited as "Marion Stone". She was married for fifty years, from 1947 to 1997, to actor-turned-theatre-critic and film historian Peter Noble, with whom she had two children, one of whom is DJ Kara Noble. During her career, she appeared in 201 films.

== Death ==
Stone died on 21 December 2009 at the age of 87.

== Carry On contributions ==
- Carry On Nurse (1959) as Alice Able
- Carry On Constable (1960) as Miss Horton (voice only, for Lucy Griffiths)
- Carry On Jack (1963) as Peg
- Carry On Screaming! (1966) as Mrs Parker
- Carry On Don't Lose Your Head (1967) as Landlady
- Carry On Doctor (1967) as Mother
- Carry On at Your Convenience (1971) as Maud
- Carry On Matron (1972) as Mrs Putzova (scenes deleted)
- Carry On Girls (1973) as Miss Drew
- Carry On Dick (1974) as Maggie
- Carry On Behind (1975) as Mrs Rowan
- Carry On Laughing: "The Case of the Screaming Winkles" (1975) as Madame Petra

== Selected other filmography ==
- Miss London Ltd. (1943) (uncredited)
- When the Bough Breaks (1947) as Shop Assistant
- Escape Dangerous (1947) as Jacqueline Fabre
- Brighton Rock (1948) as Waitress (credited as Mary Stone)
- Idol of Paris (1948) as Theresa's Secretary
- It's Hard to Be Good (1948) as Clerk in Newspaper Office (uncredited)
- A Boy, a Girl and a Bike (1949) Minor Role (uncredited)
- Marry Me! (1949) as Elsie
- Adam and Evelyne (1949) Minor Role (uncredited)
- A Run for Your Money (1949) as Miss Carpenter (uncredited)
- Miss Pilgrim's Progress (1949) as Second Factory Girl (uncredited)
- Seven Days to Noon (1950) as Woman in Phone Box (uncredited)
- Rocky Mountain (1950) as Stage Passenger (uncredited)
- The Clouded Yellow (1950) as Young Woman at Nora's House (uncredited)
- Blackmailed (1951) as Maggie
- Appointment with Venus (1951) as A.T.S. Auxiliary
- High Treason (1951) as Alfie's Mother (uncredited)
- The Magic Box (1951) as Bride in Wedding Group
- Angels One Five (1952) as W.A.A.F.
- Time Gentlemen, Please! (1952) as Mrs. Pincer
- Venetian Bird (1952) (uncredited)
- The Pickwick Papers (1952) Bit Part (uncredited)
- The Net (1953) as Maisie
- Spaceways (1953) as Mrs. Rogers (uncredited)
- Colonel March Investigates (1953) as Customer in Bank (uncredited)
- A Day to Remember (1953) as Doreen, Shorty's Girl Friend (uncredited)
- The Dog and the Diamonds (1953)
- 36 Hours (1953) as Pam Palmer
- You Know What Sailors Are (1954) as Elsie – Barmaid
- The Runaway Bus (1954) as Travel Girl
- The Good Die Young (1954) as Molly, the Barmaid (uncredited)
- The Gay Dog (1954) as Barmaid (uncredited)
- Dance Little Lady (1954) as Nurse
- Twist of Fate (1954) as Annabelle (U.S. ' Beautiful Stranger ')
- The Crowded Day (1954) as Mr. Stanton's Secretary
- Mad About Men (1954) as Waitress (scenes deleted)
- The Brain Machine (1955) as Hospital Technician (uncredited)
- Barbados Quest (1955) as Mrs. Wilson – Woman Cleaner
- The Quatermass Xperiment (1955) as Central Clinic Nurse (uncredited)
- Simon and Laura (1955) as Elsie
- Man of the Moment (1955) as Florrie the Cleaner (uncredited)
- Fun at St. Fanny's (1955) (uncredited)
- Portrait of Alison (1956) as Receptionist
- Lost (1956) as Mrs. Marley (uncredited)
- Private's Progress (1956) as Miss Sugden (uncredited)
- Cloak Without Dagger (1956) as Mrs. Markley
- Bond of Fear (1956) as Mrs. Simon
- Charley Moon (1956) as Silvers' Secretary (uncredited)
- Passport to Treason (1956) as Miss 'Jonesy' Jones
- Yield to the Night (1956) as Richardson
- The Intimate Stranger (1956) as Miss Cedrick, Ben's Secretary (uncredited)
- Eyewitness (1956) as Cinema Usherette (uncredited)
- High Terrace (1956) as Mansfield's Landlady
- A Touch of the Sun (1956) as Miss Grey, Manager's Secretary (uncredited)
- Tiger in the Smoke (1956)
- Brothers in Law (1957) as Minor Role (uncredited)
- The Good Companions (1957) as Honeymoon Couple #1
- Don Quixote (1957) as Peasant Girl (English version, voice, uncredited)
- Quatermass 2 (1957) as Secretary
- At the Stroke of Nine (1957) as Secretary
- Woman in a Dressing Gown (1957) as Hairdresser
- Hell Drivers (1957) as Nurse Attending Gino
- Time Lock (1957) (uncredited)
- Just My Luck (1957) as Tea Bar Attendant
- Man from Tangier (1957) as Woman in Hotel
- The Naked Truth (1957) (uncredited)
- Carve Her Name with Pride (1958) as Mother at Birthday Party (uncredited)
- The Golden Disc (1958) as Dryden's Secretary
- Innocent Sinners (1958) as Sparkey's Mother (uncredited)
- A Night to Remember (1958) as Stewardess (uncredited)
- A Cry from the Streets (1958) as Cleaner #1 (uncredited)
- Corridors of Blood (1958) as Woman Arrested at Black Ben's (uncredited)
- Horrors of the Black Museum (1959) as Neighbour
- The Man Who Liked Funerals (1959) as Bentham's secretary
- No Trees in the Street (1959) as Mrs. Jokel
- Carlton-Browne of the F.O. (1959) as Woman in Cinema
- The 39 Steps (1959) as Hospital Administrator (uncredited)
- Tiger Bay (1959) as Mrs. Williams
- Jack the Ripper (1959) as Drunken Woman
- Operation Bullshine (1959) as Sgt. Cook
- The Heart of a Man (1959) as Counter Girl (uncredited)
- I'm All Right Jack (1959) as T.V. Receptionist
- Jet Storm (1959)
- Follow a Star (1959) (uncredited)
- Please Turn Over' (1959) as Mrs. Waring
- The Angry Silence (1960) as Mavis
- Hell Is a City (1960)
- Never Let Go (1960) as Madge
- Doctor in Love (1960) as Hospital Sister (uncredited)
- The Big Day (1960) as Madge Delaney
- Five Golden Hours (1961) as Tina
- Double Bunk (1961) as Prospective Purchaser's Wife
- Watch It, Sailor! (1961) as Woman with Child (uncredited)
- The Frightened City (1961) as Barmaid (Riviera)
- On the Fiddle (1961) as Stretcher Bearer (uncredited)
- The Day the Earth Caught Fire (1961) as Miss Evans, Jeff's Secretary (uncredited)
- Play It Cool (1962) as Beatnik Woman (uncredited)
- Gaolbreak (1962) as Mrs. Marshall
- Crooks Anonymous (1962)
- Two and Two Make Six (1962) as Grand Hotel day receptionist
- Lolita (1962) as Vivian Darkbloom
- Jigsaw (1962) as Secretary (uncredited)
- Band of Thieves (1962) as Cleaner
- The Wild and the Willing (1962) as Clara
- Night of the Prowler (1962) as Mrs. Cross
- The Fast Lady (1962) as Miss Oldham
- The Cool Mikado (1963) as Espresso Waitress (uncredited)
- The Wrong Arm of the Law (1963) as Woman in Front Row at Meeting (uncredited)
- Paranoiac (1963) as Woman #2 (uncredited)
- Heavens Above! (1963) as Miss Palmer
- Doctor in Distress (1963) as Cafe Waitress (uncredited)
- Stolen Hours (1963) (uncredited)
- West 11 (1963) as Bit Role (uncredited)
- The World Ten Times Over (1963) (uncredited)
- The Victors (1963) as Prostitute at Hotel de Flandre (uncredited)
- Ladies Who Do (1963) as Mrs. Gubbins
- A Stitch in Time (1963) as Mrs. Cutforth – Shop Customer (uncredited)
- The Marked One (1963) as Mrs. Benson
- The Hi-Jackers (1963) as Lil
- Return to Sender (1963) as Kate
- Nothing but the Best (1964) as Horton's Secretary
- Witchcraft (1964) as Forrester's Secretary
- The Beauty Jungle (1964) as Rita (uncredited)
- A Hard Day's Night (1964) as Society Reporter (uncredited)
- Blind Corner (1964) (uncredited)
- Rattle of a Simple Man (1964) as Barmaid (uncredited)
- The Curse of the Mummy's Tomb (1964) as Bey's Landlady
- Traitor's Gate (1964) as Cashier at Dandy Club
- We Shall See, (Edgar Wallace Mysteries), (1964) as Jenny
- Troubled Waters (1964) as Miss Stone
- Act of Murder (1964) as Bobbie
- The Intelligence Men (1965) as Woman in Lift (uncredited)
- Hysteria (1965) as Marcus Allan's Secretary – Miss Grogan
- Catch Us If You Can (1965) as Mrs. Vera Stone
- Devils of Darkness (1965) as The Duchess
- You Must Be Joking! (1965) as Fan Club Worker (uncredited)
- The Night Caller (1965) as Madge Lilburn
- The Wrong Box (1966) as Spinster
- Strangler's Web, (Edgar Wallace Mysteries), (1964) as Alicia Preston
- The Sandwich Man (1966) (uncredited)
- The Spy with a Cold Nose (1966) as Mrs. Whitby (uncredited)
- A Countess from Hong Kong (1967) as Reporter #1
- Don't Lose Your Head (1967) as Landlady
- The Jokers (1967) as Woman in Scarf (uncredited)
- To Sir, with Love (1967) as Gert
- The Long Duel (1967) as Major's Wife
- The Man Outside (1967)
- Berserk! (1967) as Wanda
- Here We Go Round the Mulberry Bush (1968) as Mrs. Kelly (uncredited)
- Don't Raise the Bridge, Lower the River (1968) as Air Passenger (uncredited)
- The Bliss of Mrs. Blossom (1968) as Factory tea lady
- Baby Love (1969) as Manageress
- Lock Up Your Daughters (1969)
- Crooks and Coronets (1969) as Visitor to Stately Home (uncredited)
- Oh, What a Lovely War! (1969) as Mill Girl
- The Best House in London (1969) as Machinist (uncredited)
- Incense for the Damned (1970) as Cheerful Lady at Party (uncredited)
- Every Home Should Have One (1970) as TV Production Assistant No. 1 (uncredited)
- Doctor in Trouble (1970) as Spinster / Plain Woman
- The Games (1970) (uncredited)
- Scrooge (1970) as Party Guest
- There's a Girl in My Soup (1970) as Woman Reporter at London Airport
- The Firechasers (1971)
- All the Right Noises (1971) as Landlady
- The Raging Moon (1971) as 1st Nurse
- Countess Dracula (1971) as Kitchen Maid
- Assault (1971) as Matron
- Mr. Forbush and the Penguins (1971) as Policewoman
- Whoever Slew Auntie Roo? (1971) as Miss Wilcox
- Danny Jones (1972) as Woman in hotel
- Tower of Evil (1972) as Nurse
- All Coppers Are... (1972) as Woman in Pub
- Au Pair Girls (1972) as Mrs. Fairfax
- Bless This House (1972) as Muriel
- The Love Ban (1973) as Customer in Chemists
- The Creeping Flesh (1973) as Female Assistant
- Baxter! (1973) as Woman
- The Vault of Horror (1973) as Jane (segment 2 "The Neat Job")
- Penny Gold (1973) as Mrs. Parsons
- The Cherry Picker (1974) as Mrs. Lal
- Mistress Pamela (1974) as Katie
- Craze (1974) as Jane – Barmaid
- Confessions of a Window Cleaner (1974) as Woman in Cinema
- Percy's Progress (1974) as Reporter (uncredited)
- That Lucky Touch (1975) as Party guest
- I'm Not Feeling Myself Tonight (1976) as Consultant
- The Incredible Sarah (1976)
- Confessions from a Holiday Camp (1977) as Waitress
- Sammy's Super T-Shirt (1978) as Neighbour
- What's Up Superdoc! (1978) as Dr. Maconachie
- The Class of Miss MacMichael (1979) as Mrs. Lee
- The Human Factor (1979) as Matron
- Shillingbury Tales ('The Shillingbury Daydream', episode) (1981) as Landlady of 'The Valiant Trooper'
- The Balance of Nature (1983) as Dawn's mum
- Funny Money (1983) as Admissions Nurse
- The Wicked Lady (1983) as Customer in Shop
- Déjà Vu (1985) as Mabel
- Terry on the Fence (1986) as Mrs. Parsons
- Scotland Yard (TV series) The Tyburn Case (1957) as Secretary
- Scotland Yard (TV series) Person Unknown (1956) as Mrs Cusick
- Scotland Yard (TV series) The Ghost Train Murder (1959) as Mrs Blair

== Bibliography ==
- Jonathan Rigby, English Gothic
- Robert Ross, The Carry On Story
- Robert Ross, The Carry On Companion
- Robert Ross, Mr Carry On: The Life and work of Peter Rogers
- Neil Snelgrove, The Carry On book of Statistics
- Richard Webber, The A-Z of Everything Carry On
- Kenneth Williams, The Kenneth Williams Diaries
