= Michael Beint =

English actor (1925–2026)

- Born: Michael Edward Beint; 17 August 1925; Swindon, Wiltshire, England
- Died: 23 April 2026 (aged 100); Swindon, Wiltshire, England
- Occupation: Actor
- Years active: 1952–2010
- Spouse: Doreen Williams (m. 1948; died 2025)
- Children: 5
- Relatives: Lyndon Ogbourne (grandson)

Michael Edward Beint (17 August 1925 – 23 April 2026) was an English actor.

== Career ==
Beint began his stage career in amateur circles, then performed in repertory for four years. On the West End he performed in such plays as "You Prove It" by Colin Morris and "Rule of Three", a triple bill of plays by Agatha Christie. Beint was the first professional actor to play Sir Thomas More in the play of the same name at London Theatre Centre for the Advance Players Association, directed by John Neville. The actor subsequently connected with the National Theatre, with whom he worked for a long time. One performance here was acting as understudy to Paul Scofield in Peter Shaffer's play Amadeus (and subsequently developing an interest in Mozart).

Beint's early screen appearances were uncredited, his first credited screen roles came on television in the second half of the 1950s. He appeared in some notable television productions such as Adam Adamant Lives!, Coronation Street, Benny Hill, and Poirot. On the big screen, his film credits include Night of the Prowler (1962), The Hi-Jackers (1963) and Elizabeth (1998). Beint's last screen credit was in the medical drama series Casualty in 2010.

== Personal life and death ==
Michael Edward Beint was born in Swindon, Wiltshire, England on 17 August 1925. He was married to Doreen Williams from 1948 until her death in 2025. They had five children. All their children went into show business in some way.

Beint died at Great Western Hospital in Swindon, on 23 April 2026, aged 100. He was the grandfather of actor Lyndon Ogbourne.

== Selected filmography ==
=== Television ===
Year	Title	Role	Notes
1960	Spycatcher	Second Officer Ridge	Episode: "The Photograph"
1960	The Citadel	Mr. Morgan	Episode #1.2
1961	Probation Officer	Police Officer	Episode #2.18
1961	BBC Sunday-Night Play	Dai Llewellyn	Episode: "The Mather Story"
1962	Harpers West One	1st Reporter	Episode #2.4
1963	Drama 61-67	Rayburn	Episode: "Drama '63: Somebody's Dying"
1963	24-Hour Call	Gordon Veitch	Episode: "The Confession"
1963	BBC Sunday-Night Play	Police Sergeant	Episode: "Trial Run"
1964	First Night	Policeman	Episode: "The Second Wall"
1964	Taxi!	Ronnie	Episode: "Will You Marry Face?"
1964	No Hiding Place	Cope	Episode: "Real Class"
1964	Thorndyke	Fire Chief	Episode: "Percival Bland's Brother"
1964	Redcap	Police Sergeant Yeo	Episode: "The Orderly Officer"
1965	The Sullavan Brothers	Jack Mannering	Episode: "Passage of Arms"
1965	No Hiding Place	Insp. Blake	Episode: "The Reunion"
1965	Riviera Police	Keppler	Episode: "A Rainbow Has Two Ends"
1967	Mrs Thursday	Stanley Chadwick	Episode: "And We Don't Pay London Prices"
1967	The Newcomers	Gordon Blackstone	Episode #1.156
1967	Dr. Finlay's Casebook	Dr. Donal	Episode: "Advertising Matter"
1967	The Revenue Men	Grey	Episode: "The Golden Spider"
1968	Crime Buster	Brady	Episode: "Over the Top"
1968	Dixon of Dock Green	Ernest Watson	Episode: "Double Jeopardy"
1969	The Borderers	1st Soldier	Episode: "Fugitive"
1969	The Mind of Mr. J.G. Reeder	Inspector Salter	Episode: "The Strange Case"
1970	Armchair Theatre	Trevor	Episode: "Still Life"
1972	New Scotland Yard	Detective Sgt. Buss	Episode: "Evidence of Character"
1973	The Rivals of Sherlock Holmes	Police sergeant	Episode: "The Sensible Action of Lieutenant Holst"
1989	The Bill	Security Man	Episode: "Life and Death"

== See also ==
- List of centenarians (actors, filmmakers and entertainers)
