= Jim O'Connolly =

English actor and producer (1926–1986)

James Philip O'Connolly (23 February 1926 – December 1986), known professionally as Jim O'Connolly, was an English film director, producer, and screenwriter. He is best known for his work as associate producer of many of the Edgar Wallace Mysteries B-movies made at Merton Park Studios in the early 1960s, as well directing films such as The Hi-Jackers (1963), Smokescreen (1964), Berserk! (1967), and Tower of Evil (1972). He also directed several episodes of ITV's The Saint between 1967 and 1969.

== Credits ==
- The Astonished Heart (1950) – 3rd AD
- Trio (1950) – assistant director
- The Lavender Hill Mob (1951) – 3rd AD
- The Man in the White Suit (1951) – 3rd AD
- Secret People (1952) – 3rd AD
- Mandy (1952) – assistant director
- I Believe in You (1952) – 3rd AD
- The Gentle Gunman (1952) – 2nd AD
- Laxdale Hall (1953) – 2nd AD
- Personal Affair (1953) – 2nd unit director
- The Blazing Caravan (1954) (short) – production assistant
- The Dark Stairway (1954) (short) – production assistant
- Passenger to Tokyo (1954) (short) – production assistant
- The Diamond Wizard (1954) aka The Diamond – associate producer, assistant director
- Child's Play (1954) – 2nd AD
- The Brain Machine (1955) – 1st AD
- The Strange Case of Blondie (1955) (short) – production assistant
- Night Plane to Amsterdam (1955) (short) – production assistant
- The Love Match (1955) – assistant director
- Little Red Monkey (1955) – production manager
- The Deadliest Sin (1955) aka Confession – production manager
- The Atomic Man (1955) aka Timeslip – production manager
- Murder Anonymous (1955) (short) – production manager
- Dial 999 (1955) – production manager
- The Wall of Death (1956) (short) – production manager
- The Case of the River Morgue (1956) (short) – production manager
- Destination Death (1956) (short) – production manager
- Persons Unknown (1956) (short) – production manager
- The Intimate Stranger (1956) aka Finger of Guilt – production manager
- The Counterfeit Plan (1957) – production manager
- The Lonely House (1957) (short) – production manager
- Bullet from the Past (1957) (short) – production manager
- Inside Information (1957) (short) – production manager
- Scotland Yard Dragnet (1957) aka The Hypnotist – production manager
- The Case of The Smiling Widow (1957) (short) – production manager
- Man in the Shadow (1957) – production manager
- The Mail Van Murder (1957) (short) – production manager
- The White Cliffs Mystery (1957) (short) – associate producer
- The Tyburn Case (1957) (short) – associate producer
- Night Crossing (1957) (short) – associate producer
- Escapement (1958) aka The Electronic Magnet – associate producer
- The Strange Awakening (1958) aka Female Fiends – associate producer
- Print of Death (1958) (short) – associate producer
- The Cross-Road Gallows (1958) (short) – associate producer
- Crime of Honour (1958) (short) – associate producer
- The Unseeing Eye (1959) (short) – production manager
- Horrors of the Black Museum (1959) – production manager
- The Ghost Train Murder (1959) (short) – associate producer
- The Dover Road Mystery (1960) (short) – associate producer
- The Edgar Wallace Mystery Theatre (1959–62) – associate producer
- Urge to Kill (1960) – associate producer
- The Last Train (1960) (short) – associate producer
- Concrete Jungle (1960) aka The Criminal – associate producer
- The Man Who Was Nobody (1960) – associate producer
- Marriage of Convenience (1960) – associate producer
- Evidence in Concrete (1960) (short) – associate producer
- Clue of the Twisted Candle (1960) – associate producer
- The Silent Weapon (1961) (short) – associate producer
- The Grand Junction Case (1961) (short) – associate producer
- Konga (1961) – associate producer
- The Clue of the New Pin (1961) – associate producer
- Wings of Death (1961) (short) – associate producer
- The Square Mile Murder (1961) (short) – associate producer
- Man at the Carlton Tower (1961)
- Partners in Crime (1961)
- The Never Never Murder (1961) (short) – associate producer
- The Fourth Square (1961) – associate producer
- Never Back Losers (1961) – associate producer
- Man Detained (1961) – associate producer
- Clue of the Silver Key (1961) – associate producer
- Attempt to Kill (1961) – associate producer
- The Sinister Man (1961) – associate producer
- Candidate for Murder (1962) – associate producer
- Emergency (1962) – writer
- The Traitors (1962) – writer, producer
- Flat Two (1962) – associate producer
- Backfire! (1962) – associate producer
- Shadow of Fear (1954) – writer
- The Hi-Jackers (1963) – writer, director
- Farewell Performance (1963) – writer, producer
- Gideon's Way (1964) (TV series) – writer ("State Visit")
- Smokescreen (1964) – writer, director
- The Little Ones (1965) – writer, director
- The Night Caller (1965) – writer
- A Study in Terror (1965) – original story
- Berserk! (1967) – director
- The Saint (1967) (TV series) – director
- Vendetta for the Saint (1969) – director
- Crooks and Coronets (1969) – writer, director
- The Valley of Gwangi (1969) – director
- Tower of Evil (1972) – writer, director
- Mistress Pamela (1974) – writer, producer, director
