= The Little Ones =

1965 film

- Directed by: Jim O'Connolly
- Written by: Jim O'Connolly
- Produced by: Freddie Robertson
- Starring: Carl Gonzales; Kim Smith; Dudley Foster; Derek Newark
- Cinematography: David Holmes
- Edited by: Henry Richardson
- Production company: Goldhawk
- Distributed by: Columbia Pictures
- Release date: 1965
- Running time: 66 minutes
- Country: United Kingdom
- Language: English

The Little Ones is a 1965 British family comedy film directed and written by Jim O'Connolly and starring Carl Gonzales, Kim Smith, Dudley Foster and Derek Newark.

== Plot ==
Two poor boys from London, Ted, an abused child and Jackie, the son of a prostitute run away to Liverpool in an attempt to stowaway on a ship bound to Jamaica. Arriving in Liverpool tired and hungry, they steal a suitcase which they hope to pawn for money to provide food. The owner of the suitcase, a wealthy shipping businessman, alerts the police and the boys are subsequently caught, scolded and sent home. Recognizing their dire life at home, a friendly superintendent tells the boys that many ships leave here for Jamaica.

== Cast ==
- Carl Gonzales as Jackie
- Kim Smith as Ted
- Dudley Foster as Supt. Carter
- Derek Newark as Det. Wilson
- Jean Marlow as Ted's mother
- Peter Thomas as Ted's father
- Derek Francis as Paddy
- Cyril Shaps as Child Welfare Officer
- John Chandos as Lord Brantley
- Diane Aubrey as Peggy

== Reception ==
The Monthly Film Bulletin wrote: "Once the sordid opening phase of the narrative is past, this film moves into a rich and attractive vein of humour, The engaging personalities and natural acting of the two youngsters, as well as Dudley Foster's characterisation of the police inspector, have a good deal to do with the film's success. But it is also deftly directed, and has an excellent script which surmounts the treacherous hurdle of children's dialogue with flying colours: the chatter and observations of the two boys has a nicely truthful ring. This is a slight film, perhaps, but eminently rewarding in its own field – and way above the standard of the average second feature."

Variety wrote: "This is unpretentious and not more than a useful program filler, But it is entertaining, produced and directed professionally, and has a stamp of sincerity which is engaging. ... O'Connolly's script is often naive, and the characters of the white lad's parents are stridently overdrawn. But somehow the simple yarn works. His direction is straightforward and a nice blend of humor and atmosphere. Location scenes in London and Liverpool have been caught well. Other credits, including Malcolm Lockyer's score and Arthur Fell's sets, are okay within the simple limits of budget. Carl Gonzales, as the half caste nipper, and Kim Smith, as his younger buddy are natural youngsters. Young Smith's thin voice is sometimes a strain on the ears. Dudley Foster turns in a sympathetic stint as a harassed police inspector."
