= David Kernan =

British actor (1938–2023)

- Born: David Stanley Kernan; 23 June 1938; London, England
- Died: 26 December 2023 (aged 85)
- Occupations: Actor; singer
- Years active: 1959–1995

David Stanley Kernan (23 June 1938 – 26 December 2023) was an English actor, best known as an interpreter of the songs of Stephen Sondheim. Kernan appeared in stage musicals and was a soloist in various British variety shows throughout the 1960s and 1970s including That Was the Week That Was (1962–1963).

== Early life ==
David Stanley Kernan was born 23 June 1938 in East Ham, London, to Joseph and Lily (née Russell) Kernan. His father abandoned the family shortly after his birth. At the age of four, Kernan was sent to live with his grandmother in Oxford.

He began singing as a child with the choir at the University Church of St Mary the Virgin, and became head chorister. He attended Portchester School in Bournemouth, an 11–16 boys secondary school, but left at the age of 15. At the behest of his mother, he began training as a chef.

A short time later, Kernan began acting with the Bournemouth Shakespeare Players. Kernan's career in the theatre began in 1957 as an assistant stage manager at the Theatre Royal in Huddersfield, West Riding of Yorkshire. Encouraged to continue acting, he moved to London and became a shop assistant.

== Career ==
=== Theatre ===
Kernan made his West End debut as a member of the chorus in the musical Where’s Charley? at the Palace Theatre. The musical opened on 20 February 1958 and ran for 404 performances. Kernan used the income to pay for acting, dancing, and singing lessons.

After a stint on television, he appeared as the Hon. Ernest Woolley in Our Man Crichton in its West End debut at the Shaftesbury Theatre. The play premiered on 22 December 1964, and ran for 208 performances.

In 1970 he appeared in the original London production of the musical 1776. He played the role of Count Malcolm in the original London production of Sondheim's A Little Night Music (1975-76). In 1977 he was nominated for a Tony Award for Best Performance by a Featured Actor in a Musical for his appearance in the original Broadway cast of Side by Side by Sondheim. He also made two appearances on BBC TV's long running music hall variety show, The Good Old Days, in the 1970s and 1980s.

=== Television ===
Kernan made his television debut singing with Millicent Martin on the BBC current affairs series Tonight. Producer Ned Sherrin so liked the pair that he hired them to appear on That Was the Week That Was in 1962.

In the early 1970s, Kernan appeared in the television period drama Upstairs, Downstairs. He played the role of Captain Charles Hammond, the young lover of Lady Marjorie Bellamy, in the episode "Magic Casements".

Kernan also had small roles in two episodes of The Avengers in the 1960s - as an amateur radio enthusiast and chess player in "Never, Never Say Die" - and, in a scene-stealing turn, as a foot fetishist shoe designer who, in the shuddering throes of repressed ecstasy, moulds Emma Peel’s left foot in plaster of Paris, in "Quick Quick, Slow Death".

Kernan co-starred as Mr Kodaly opposite Robin Ellis in the 1980s television version of the popular Christmas musical She Loves Me.

Kernan also had small roles in several films, including Gaolbreak (1962), Mix Me a Person (1962), Farewell Performance (1963), Zulu (1964), Otley (1968), Up the Chastity Belt (1971) and Carry On Abroad (1972).

== Personal life and death ==
Kernan entered into a civil partnership with Stuart Forsyth in 2008. The pair married in 2014.

He published an autobiography, From East Ham to Broadway, in 2019.

Kernan suffered from Alzheimer's disease, and died on 26 December 2023 at the age of 85. He was survived by his husband, Stuart Forsyth.

== Filmography ==
Year	Title	Role	Notes
1962	Gaolbreak	Len Rogerson	
1962	Mix Me a Person	Socko	
1963	Farewell Performance	Ray Baron	
1964	Zulu	Private Frederick Hitch	
1968	Otley	Ground steward	
1969	Der Porno-Graf von Schweden	Freddie Horne	
1971	Up the Chastity Belt	Troubadour	
1972	Carry On Abroad	Nicholas	
1973	The Day of the Jackal	Per Lundquist	Uncredited
1974	The Education of Sonny Carson	Judge	
