= The Love Ban =

1973 British film by Ralph Thomas

- Directed by: Ralph Thomas
- Based on: the play It's a 2'6" Above the Ground World by Kevin Laffan
- Produced by: Betty E. Box
- Starring: Hywel Bennett; Nanette Newman; Angharad Rees
- Cinematography: Tony Imi
- Edited by: Roy Watts
- Music by: Stanley Myers
- Production company: Welbeck Films
- Distributed by: British Lion Films
- Release date: 25 January 1973
- Running time: 96 minutes
- Country: United Kingdom
- Language: English
- Budget: £98,121
- Box office: £110,093

The Love Ban (also known as It's a 2'6" Above the Ground World, It's a Two Feet Six Inches above the Ground World and Anyone for Sex?) is a 1973 British comedy film directed by Ralph Thomas and starring Hywel Bennett, Nanette Newman and Milo O'Shea. It was written by Kevin Laffan based on his 1969 play It's a 2'6" Above the Ground World. Laffan was one of 14 children from a devout Roman Catholic family and his critical view on the Church's stance on birth control was a recurring theme of his work.

== Plot ==
A married couple with six children experience marital difficulties. Wife Kate refuses to sleep with husband Mick until he uses birth control, while their live-in au-pair falls pregnant.

== Cast ==
- Hywel Bennett as Mick Goonahan
- Nanette Newman as Kate Goonahan
- Milo O'Shea as Father Andrew
- Angharad Rees as Jackie
- Nicky Henson as Baker
- Georgina Hale as Joyce
- Madeline Smith as Miss Partridge
- Peter Barkworth as bra factory director
- John Cleese as contraceptives lecturer
- Marianne Stone as customer in chemists shop
- Nina Baden-Semper as Skyline waitress
- Cheryl Hall as pregnant woman
- Jacki Piper as pregnant woman
- David Howey as barber
- Tommy Godfrey as barber
- James Leith as policeman
- Tony Haygarth as policeman
- Pauline Delaney as Mrs Hale (as Pauline Delany)

== Production ==
The film was shot at Shepperton Studios with sets designed by the art director Anthony Pratt.

== Critical reception ==
The Monthly Film Bulletin wrote: "If, as on current form it thoroughly deserves to, the British film industry of the early Seventies comes to be remembered primarily for its abysmal comedies, then this quasi-sociological dirty joke about religio-sexual hang-ups is unlikely to be quoted as a shining exception. The halting screenplay and Ralph Thomas' torpid, direction have drained the life out of Kevin Laffan's popular stage play, and no amount of back-up (Christmas for sentimentalists, John Cleese for sophisticates) can disguise the fact. The film is also insultingly ambivalent, smugly sticking up (as Mr. Thomas, might have put it) for women's lib with its central message, while at the same time offering cheap thrills and easy laughs on the side by filling the screen with capering nudes and demonstrating the apocryphal incompetence of all lady drivers. Of the ill-used cast, only the admirable Nanette Newman manages on occasion to make one believe that the script has, underneath all the tired innuendo, something seriously funny to say."
