= Walter J. Harvey =

British cinematographer (1903–1979)

Walter Frederick William Pape (1903–1979) was a British cinematographer and the elder brother of actress Lilian Harvey. He was born on 9 February 1903 in Hornsey, London.

== Selected filmography ==
- The Man from Chicago (1930)
- Love Lies (1931)
- Hobson's Choice (1931)
- Strip! Strip! Hooray!!! (1932)
- His Wife's Mother (1932)
- The Love Nest (1933)
- Their Night Out (1933)
- Money Talks (1933)
- Facing the Music (1933)
- Bulldog Drummond at Bay (1937)
- The Dominant Sex (1937)
- Just William (1940)
- The House of the Arrow (1940)
- The Flying Squad (1940)
- It Happened to One Man (1940)
- Spring Meeting (1941)
- Tower of Terror (1941)
- Badger's Green (1949)
- Dark Secret (1949)
- Cloudburst (1951)
- A Case for PC 49 (1951)
- To Have and to Hold (1951)
- Whispering Smith Hits London (1952)
- Stolen Face (1952)
- Death of an Angel (1952)
- Wings of Danger (1952)
- Blood Orange (1953)
- Face the Music (1954)
- Murder by Proxy (1954)
- The House Across the Lake (1954)
- Life with the Lyons (1954)
- The Men of Sherwood Forest (1954)
- Mask of Dust (1954)
- The Lyons in Paris (1955)
- The Quatermass Xperiment (1955)
- Women Without Men (1956)
- Kill Her Gently (1957)
- Account Rendered (1957)
- West of Suez (1957)
- Death Over My Shoulder (1958)
- Spy in the Sky! (1958)
- Naked Fury (1959)
- Jungle Street (1960)
- Operation Cupid (1960)
- The Hand (1960)
- Three Spare Wives (1962)
- Emergency (1962)
- The Spanish Sword (1962)
- Night of the Prowler (1962)
- Danger by My Side (1962)
- The Hi-Jackers (1963)
- Delayed Flight (1964)
