= Rosemarie Dunham =

British actress (1924–2016)

- Photo by Cornel Lucas, 1981
- Born: Rosemarie Tomlinson; 13 December 1924; Leuchars, Fife, Scotland
- Died: 5 December 2016 (aged 91); London, England
- Other name: Rosemary Dunham
- Occupation: Actress
- Years active: 1960–2000
- Spouse(s): Michael Ingrams (1949-?) (divorced) (1 child); Gerald William Paul Orlando Bridgeman (1965-2018)

Rosemarie Dunham (born Rosemarie Tomlinson; 13 December 1924 – 5 December 2016) was a British actress. She is sometimes credited as Rosemary Dunham.

== Early life ==
Dunham was born in Leuchars, Fife, the daughter of Willis Tomlinson, an English squadron leader stationed on the RAF base at Leuchars who died on 26 March 1975 and Catherine, maiden name Parissi of Greek background who died on 15 April 1991

== Career ==
On stage, Dunham was a member of the Croydon Repertory Players in 1953. She played Nerissa in a 1961 production of The Merchant of Venice at the Old Vic theatre, sharing the bill with Barbara Leigh-Hunt and John Stride. She appeared in a 1967 production of Frederick Lonsdale's Aren't We All? at London's Savoy Theatre, sharing the bill with William Mervyn, Vincent Ball, Jane Downs, and Viola Keats.

Dunham's television work was extensive, and included appearances in The Avengers, No Hiding Place, Public Eye, The Sweeney, Dixon of Dock Green, Z-Cars, Father Brown, Coronation Street, Kisses at Fifty and The Cedar Tree. Her best-known film role was as the "aging, but amorously inclined, landlady" Edna in the 1971 gangster movie Get Carter. Her other film roles included Something to Hide (1972), Mistress Pamela (1974), The Incredible Sarah (1976), Lady Oscar (1979), Croupier (1998), and The Wolves of Kromer (1998).

== Personal life ==
Rosemarie Tomlinson was married to Michael Dunham Ingrams, the television presenter and documentary film-maker, and took her stage name from his middle name. They had a son, Paul Ingrams, born in 1949. Her second husband was Gerald William Paul Orlando Bridgeman, son of Commander Francis Bridgeman and Alice Dorothy Bridgeman; they married in 1965. She died in 2016, in London, just before her 92nd birthday.

== Partial filmography ==
- The Masque of the Red Death (1964) – (uncredited)
- Gideon's Way 'The Prowler' (1965) – Sophie Murdoch
- Get Carter (1971) – Edna Garfoot
- Something to Hide (1972) – Elsie
- Mistress Pamela (1974) – Mistress Blimper
- The Incredible Sarah (1976) – Mrs. Bernhardt
- Lady Oscar (1979) – Marquise de Boulainvilliers
- Tai-Pan (1986) – Mrs. Fothergill
- Croupier (1998) – Jewish Woman
- The Wolves of Kromer (1998) – Mrs Drax
- Out of Depth (2000) – Rose (final film role)
