= Margaret Towner (actress) =

British actress (1920–2017)

Margaret Towner (1 October 1920 – 10 April 2017) was a British stage, film, and television actress. Following decades of theatre work, Towner achieved fame among film audiences when she appeared in a small, but significant, role as Jira in the 1999 Star Wars prequel, Star Wars: Episode I – The Phantom Menace. In 2014, at the age of 93, Towner returned to screen acting for a 13-episode role as Edna on Ricky Gervais' television series, Derek, becoming one of the oldest working actresses in the United Kingdom.

== Biography ==
Towner was born in Rio de Janeiro, Brazil, on 1 October 1920. Her father, Eric Towner, a Lieutenant Commander in the Royal Naval Reserve, was awarded the Distinguished Service Cross for courage and devotion by King George VI in 1943 for his service in support of Field Marshal Bernard Montgomery's Eighth Army during the North African Campaign during World War II. Margaret Towner was raised in Rio de Janeiro until she was five-years old, when her family returned to the United Kingdom and settled in a houseboat in Southampton.

Margaret Towner enrolled at Royal Academy of Dramatic Art (RADA) in 1938, where her classmates included Australian actor John McCallum, Anglo-Irish actor Joyce Redman, and Nigel Stock. She had difficulty finding professional stage and film roles, later writing that other actresses up for competing roles were "all looking singularly unlike me" in her memoir, How Could You Have Done This Without Us?. She was initially cast in bit parts in British films during the 1930s and 1940s, including Under Your Hat (1940), in which she played a tall girl opposite Cicely Courtneidge and Jack Hulbert.

Her first professional theatre role after graduating from RADA was in a touring stage production of "The Bare Idea", a play about a nudist camp written by Gordon Sherry. She toured with the cast of "The Bare Idea" until nightly German Luftwaffe bombing raids on Southampton ended the production around 1940. Shortly after the show's cancellation, she then joined the Entertainments National Service Association's (ENSA) touring stage production of "The Amazing Dr. Clitterhouse" during World War II, where she met her future husband, actor Raymond Francis. The couple married and had three children, Caroline, Frances and Clive. Towner "reluctantly" retired from acting for more than thirty years to raise her family. Francis became best known for his role of Superintendent Lockhart on the ITV series, No Hiding Place, during the 1950s and 1960s.

Margaret Towner decided to return to professional acting shortly after her husband's death in 1987. She re-applied and rejoined the Equity, the actors' union, with an honorary membership. Towner was soon cast in series of professional, on-screen roles from the 1980s to the 2010s. Her film credits included The Wolves of Kromer in 2000, while her television roles after her return to acting included Casualty in 1992 and 1997, The Bill during the mid-1990s, Keeping Up Appearances in 1995, Doctors in 2003, and Little Britain in 2005.

In 1997, Towner was invited to Bray Studios near Maidenhead to meet with director George Lucas about a potential role in his forthcoming Star Wars prequel, which was in pre-production. Towner readily admitted that she had never heard of Lucas before her meeting with the film director and creator of Star Wars. Despite that, Towner was cast in a small, but important, role as Jira, a market vendor who befriends a young Anakin Skywalker, in Lucas' Star Wars: Episode I – The Phantom Menace, released in 1999. Margaret Towner instantly became a well-known figure to moviegoers and Star Wars fans. She attended Star Wars conventions throughout the United Kingdom and met with fans who showed up at her Victorian home in Twickenham.

In 2014 Towner, who was 93 years old at the time, returned to television in a 13-episode recurring role as Edna on Ricky Gervais' Channel 4 television, Derek. Her work on Derek made her one of the country's oldest working, professional actresses.

Towner died on 10 April 2017 at the age of 96. She was survived by three children: two daughters and one son, actor Clive Francis. Her late husband, actor Raymond Francis, died in 1987.

== Filmography ==
Year	Title	Role	Notes
1998	The Wolves of Kromer	Doreen	
1999	Star Wars: Episode I – The Phantom Menace	Jira	
