= Farewell Performance =

1963 British film by Robert Tronson

- Lobby card
- Directed by: Robert Tronson
- Written by: Aileen Burke; Leone Stuart
- Produced by: Jim O'Connolly
- Starring: David Kernan; Frederick Jaeger; Delphi Lawrence
- Music by: Joe Meek
- Production company: Sevenay Productions
- Distributed by: J. Arthur Rank Film Distributors
- Release date: December 1963
- Running time: 73 minutes
- Country: United Kingdom
- Language: English

Farewell Performance is a 1963 British crime film directed by Robert Tronson and starring David Kernan, Frederick Jaeger and Delphi Lawrence. It was written by Aileen Burke and Leone Stuart, and features musical interludes from Joe Meek acts including The Tornados and Heinz.

It is considered a lost film and is on the BFI National Archive's 75 Most Wanted List of missing films.

== Plot ==
After pop singer Ray Baron is found murdered by cyanide, Superintendent Raven tries to work out which of Baron's many enemies is responsible.

== Cast ==
- David Kernan as Ray Baron
- Delphi Lawrence as Janice Marlon
- Frederick Jaeger as Paul Warner
- Derek Francis as Superintendent Raven
- Alfred Burke as Marlon
- John Kelland as Mitch
- Toni Gilpin as Carol
- James Copeland as Andrews
- Ron Perry as Dennis
- Denise Coffey as Dickie
- Artro Morris as George
- Sean Lynch as Harry
- Hugh Futcher as Max
- Donald Tandy as Woods
- Middleton Woods as Pop
- Fred Hugh as manager
- The Tornados as themselves
- Heinz as himself
- Tommy Devel and Partner as themselves

== Critical reception ==
The Monthly Film Bulletin wrote: "Although the routine plot is supported by a number of pop music interludes, presumably inserted with the object of appealing to teenagers, the backstage murder theme, and even much of the dialogue, harks back to the early Thirties. The number of suspects is more limited than usual, and the identity of the murderer is not very skilfully concealed."

Kine Weekly wrote: "The dramatic development is here interspersed with variety turns and include numbers from the pop singer, an amusing chimp act, a clever juggling pair and The Tornados, an instrumental quartet. The many heartaches of show business troupers register effectively and the atmosphere of the variety theatre, both front and back-stage, well contrived. David Kernan convinces as the teenage idol and Delphi Lawrence is pathetic as the much older woman who is prepared to sacrifice everything for him. Sound support is headed by Frederick Jaeger, as the killer, and Alfred Burke, as the unfortunate husband."

== See also ==
- List of lost films
