= Dudley Foster =

English actor (1924–1973)

- Born: Frank Dudley Foster; 7 August 1924; Knaresborough, Yorkshire West Riding, England
- Died: 8 January 1973 (aged 48); Hampstead, Greater London, England
- Burial place: Hampstead Cemetery
- Education: University of Leeds
- Occupation: Actor
- Years active: 1948–1973
- Spouse: Eileen Kennally (m. 1952)
- Children: 2

Frank Dudley Foster (7 August 1924 – 8 January 1973) was an English actor.

== Early life ==
Frank Dudley Foster was born in Knaresborough, Yorkshire West Riding, England, on 7 August 1924, as the youngest child to Frank Geden Foster, a civil engineer, and his wife, Ruth Chapman (née Butler), a barmaid. He had two siblings, a brother, John Geden Foster, and a sister, Ruth Butler 'Jill' Foster. His family had established links with the theatre as both of his siblings also appeared on the stage.

Foster attended Pocklington School, a private school, in Pocklington, East Riding of Yorkshire. He began service as a navigator in the Royal Air Force when he left school. After he was demobbed, he studied chemistry at the University of Leeds.

== Career ==
Foster joined the recently formed Bradford Civic Playhouse Theatre School in 1948. After turning professional, he spent several successful years with Northern repertory companies. From the late 1950s and into the early 1960s, he was a member of Joan Littlewood's Theatre Workshop, based at London's Theatre Royal Stratford East. In her autobiography, Joan's Book, Littlewood recalled that Foster had a wealthy father who financed some of the troupe's productions.

Foster appeared in The Night Walker in 1966.

== Personal life ==
Foster married Eileen Mary Kennally, an actress, in Sunderland, Durham, in April 1952. They had two sons together, Mark A Foster (b. 1953) and Benjamin Dudley Foster (b. 1965).

== Death ==
On 8 January 1973, Foster died at his home 3 Holly Hill, Hampstead in Greater London. He was 48. His death was said to be a suicide by hanging. His body was discovered by his wife, Eileen. She found him hanging from the stairs at their home, cut him down with a bread knife and tried to revive him with mouth-to-mouth resuscitation. His father, who was said by a close family friend to be the driving force behind Foster in his career, had died at the age of 81, exactly a week before his son. The close family friend added: "He pushed Dudley on to better things and encouraged him all the way". He was buried at Hampstead Cemetery in West Hampstead, London.

== Filmography ==
Year	Title	Role	Notes
1954	Six Characters in Search of an Author	The Stage Carpenter	Television film
1955	Fast and Loose		Episode: "Episode #2.4"
1955	Othello		
1956	The Tamer Tamed		Television film
1957	No Road Back	Fingerprint Man	
1958	The Two-Headed Spy	Gestapo Agent	
1958	Incident at Echo Six	Sergeant Carmichael	Television film
1958, 1960–1961, 1965	Play of the Week	Warden Regan, Harry Smith, Inspector Beecroft, Sweeney	4 episodes
1959	The Invisible Man	Cable Car Operator	Episode: "Odds Against Death"
1959	Operation Bullshine	Gunner	
1959	The Four Just Men	Luigi	Episode: "The Crying Jester"
1959	Interpol Calling	Killer In Hat	Episode: "Last Man Lucky"
1959–1962	ITV Television Playhouse	Mr. Gregory, Bamford, Paul Munning, George, Harry	5 episodes
1960	Scotland Yard	Detective Inspector Hodgson	Episode: "Special Duty"
1960	Man in the Moon	N.A.R.S.T.I Security Guard	
1960	Julius Caesar	Casca	2 episodes
1960	Police Surgeon	George Bates	Episode: "Operation Mangle"
1960	Saturday Playhouse	Harry Migglewood	Episode: "A Run for the Money"
1960–1962	BBC Sunday-Night Play	Lance-Cpl. Broughton, Gherea, Ed Horner, Roberts, Mr. Miller	5 episodes
1960–1961, 1967, 1971	Armchair Theatre	Hugo, George Gladwin, Tom Fenton	4 episodes
1961	Jango	Store Manager	Episode: "The Itching Fingers of Lady Ffoukes"
1961	No Thoroughfare	Fotheringay	Television film
1961	Sykes and a...		Episode: "Sykes and a Surprise"
1961	Coronation Street	Tom Hayes	7 episodes
1961	Echo Four Two	Tom Dukes	Episode: "Frozen Fire"
1961	Ghost Squad	Vic Diamond	Episode: "The Eyes of the Bat"
1961	The Wakefield Shepherd's Play	First Shepherd	Short film
1962	Term of Trial	Det. Sgt. Kiernan	
1962	Bootsie and Snudge	Capt. Chepstow	Episode: "The Importance of Being Jumbo"
1962–1863, 1965	Drama 61-67	Gilbert Platt, Sam Carver, Inspector Morris	3 episodes
1962, 1964, 1971	Z-Cars	Det. Insp. Dunn, Supt. Dunn, Leonard Smith	16 episodes
1963	It Happened Like This	Hickman	Episode: "The Hill of Lions"
1963	The Plane Makers	Harry	Episode: "The Silent and the Damned"
1963	Ricochet	Peter Dexter	
1963	Moonstrike	Philippe	Episode: "Round Trip"
1963	24-Hour Call	George Manning	Episode: "People Are So Kind"
1963	Zero One	Abdul Pasha	Episode: "Triple Cross"
1963	Festival	Eisenring	Episode: "The Fire Raisers"
1963–1964	First Night	John Farley, Anderson	2 episodes
1963–1964	Edgar Wallace Mysteries	Peter Dexter, Philip Teasdale	2 episodes
1963, 1965, 1970	Steptoe and Son	Martin, Mr. Stonelake, Car Salesman, The Detective	4 episodes
1964	Comedy Playhouse	Mr. Gibson	Episode: "The Mascot"
1964	Crane	Charles	Episode: "Two Rings for Danger"
1964	Taxi!	Eddie Ryder	Episode: "We've Got to Live in the Winter"
1964	The Hidden Truth	Ernest Malet	Episode: "The Boiler Suite Shape"
1964	Story Parade	Adam Harpur	Episode: "A Dragon to Kill"
1965	The Villains	Dave Williams	Episode: "Three to a Cell"
1965	The Sullavan Brothers	Rand	Episode: "The Gallows in My Garden"
1965	Thursday Theatre	Sgt. Maj. Tommy Lodge	Episode: "Celebration"
1965	The Worker	Mr. Grey	Episode: "A Democratic Democratism"
1965	Never Mention Murder	Philip Teasdale	
1965	The Saint	Jones	Episode: "The Abductors"
1965	The Little Ones	Supt. Carter	
1965	Six of the Best	Otto Mulchrone	Episode: "Porterhouse: Private Eye"
1965	Here's Harry		Episode: "The Indentification Parade"
1965	A Study in Terror	Home Secretary	
1965	The Mask of Janus	Ernest Fox	Episode: "The Public Interest"
1965	Blackmail	Joe Griffin	Episode: "First Offender"
1965	Barney Is My Darling		Episode: "The Twenty Six Year Itch"
1965	A Letter for Liz		Video
1965, 1967, 1969	The Avengers	Philip Leas, Mr. Goat, Parker	3 episodes
1965, 1969	The Wednesday Play	Antrobus, The Expert	2 episodes
1965–1966, 1972	Public Eye	Mr. Paggot, Gordon Ansell, Major Thursby-Byers	3 episodes
1966	Danger Man	Giorgio	Episode: "The Contessa"
1966	Theatre 625	Kirill	Episode: "The Twelfth Hour"
1966	Three Rousing Tinkles	Short, Near, Sharp Man	Episode: "The Best I Can Do for You by Way of a Gate-leg Table Is a Hundred-weight of Coal"
1966	No Hiding Place	Bowdler	Episode: "The Night Walker"
1966	Cooperama		Episode: "Episode Five"
1966	Bat Out of Hell	Inspector Clay	5 episodes
1966	Horizon	Edward Hastings	Episode: "Hand Me My Sword, Humphrey"
1966–1968	Harry Worth	Baker, William J. Rankin, Mr. Boothroyd, Neville Culpepper	4 episodes
1966, 1969	Thirty-Minute Theatre	Frank, Mr. Burton	2 episodes
1967	Uncle Charles	C.S.M. Lee	Episode: "Gentle Counsels"
1967	Who Is Sylvia?		Episode: "A Pool of Blood and a Red Carnation"
1967	The Newcomers	Mr. Fielding	6 episodes
1967	Mickey Dunne	Specs Logan	Episode: "Over the Hill"
1967	The Informer	James Hughes	Episode: "Here's Where Who Takes Over?"
1967	For Schools and Colleges: Drama	Book-Keeper	Episode: "Bad Business"
1967	A Hundred Years of Humphrey Hastings	Humphrey Hastings, Edward Hastings	6 episodes
1968	City '68	Jim Ralston	Episode: "The Old Country"
1968	The Gamblers	Other man	Episode: "Try a Little Tenderness"
1968–1969	Life with Cooper	Various	2 episodes
1969	Where's Jack?	Blueskin	
1969	Doctor Who	Maurice Caven	5 episodes
1969	The Expert	Albert Carr	Episode: "Flesh and Blood"
1969	Randall and Hopkirk (Deceased)	George Foster	Episode: "All Work and No Pay"
1969	Moon Zero Two	Whitsun	
1970	Foreign Exchange	Leo	
1970	Codename	Bazna	Episode: "Have a Word with Greco"
1970	If It Moves, File It	Foster	6 episodes
1970	The Rise and Rise of Michael Rimmer	Federman	
1970	Wuthering Heights	Mr. Green	
1970	It's a Terrible Waste of an Egg	Humphrey Hastings	Television film
1971	Play for Today	Darkly	Episode: "Billy's Last Stand"
1971	That's Your Funeral	Grimthorpe	2 episodes
1971	Catweazle	Hector Kenley	Episode: "The Ghost Hunters"
1971	Birds on the Wing	Sir George West	Episode: "Episode #1.2"
1971	Dulcima	Symes	
1971	Quest for Love	Grimshaw	
1971	The Rivals of Sherlock Holmes	Chief Supt. Vyvyan	Episode: "The Duchess of Wiltshire's Diamonds"
1971	The Persuaders!	Heather	Episode: "Anyone Can Play"
1971	The Fenn Street Gang	Mr. Stringer	Episode: "All Mod Cons"
1971	I Can See It All	Humphrey Hastings	Television film
1972	Jason King	Ackroyd	
1972	It's Murder But Is It Art	Inspector Hook	6 episodes
1972	Follow Me!	Mr. Mayhew	Episode: "An Author in Search of Two Characters"
1972	Stage 2	Strange passenger, Eberkopf	Episode: "Peer Gynt"
1972	Harriet's Back in Town	Stanley Pemberton	2 episodes
1972	That's Your Funeral	Grimthorpe	
1973	Mistress Pamela	Jonathan	Posthumous release
