= Oliver Johnston (actor) =

English actor (1888–1966)

- Publicity still, 1960
- Born: Oliver Griffen Johnston; 30 April 1888; Beaconsfield, Buckinghamshire, England
- Died: 22 December 1966 (aged 78); Westminster, London, England
- Years active: 1938–1966

Oliver Griffen Johnston (30 April 1888 – 22 December 1966) was an English actor.

== Stage ==
After training at RADA, his theatre work included the original production of The Barretts of Wimpole Street at Malvern (1930) and its subsequent West End transfer (1930–1932).

== Film and television ==
Johnston started his film career in 1938, when he was already 50 years old. Working until shortly before his death, he appeared in nearly 90 film and television productions, where he often portrayed meek or mild-mannered types in supporting roles.

Johnston had a rather unremarkable acting career in film until he was nearly 70 years, when he was discovered by Charlie Chaplin. He is perhaps best-remembered for his role in Chaplin's A King in New York (1957), where he played a large supporting role as the "faithful ambassador and solemn-serious straight man" to Chaplin's King. Afterwards he got more film offers, including the literature adaption Kidnapped (1960) and fantasy/horror pictures like The Three Lives of Thomasina (1963), The Tomb of Ligeia (1964) and It! (1967).

One of his last roles, released after his death in December 1966 at age 78, was in Chaplin's last film A Countess from Hong Kong (1967). Here Johnston portrayed an old British businessman in Hong Kong, who introduces the leading characters of Marlon Brando and Sophia Loren to each other in the opening scenes.

== Selected filmography ==
Year	Title	Role	Notes
1938	Kate Plus Ten	Cunningham	
1939	Stolen Life	Prof. Bardesley	
1953	The Good Beginning	Owen	Uncredited
1954	Dangerous Voyage	Dr. Waverley	
1954	Tale of Three Women	Butler	(segment "Wedding Gift")
1955	Room in the House		
1957	The Hypnotist	Doctor Kenyon	
1957	You Can't Escape		Meadows
1957	A King in New York	Ambassador Jaume	
1958	Indiscreet	Mr. Finleigh	Uncredited
1958	The Son of Robin Hood	Apothecary	
1958	Nowhere to Go	Mr. Hopkins	Uncredited
1959	Beyond This Place	Prusty	
1959	The Night We Dropped a Clanger	Air Commodore Turner	
1960	A Touch of Larceny	Minister	
1960	Kidnapped	Mr. Campbell	
1960	The 3 Worlds of Gulliver	Mr. Grinch	Uncredited
1961	Francis of Assisi	Father Livoni	
1961	Raising the Wind	Prof. Parkin	
1962	Backfire!	Bernard Curzon	Edgar Wallace Mysteries
1963	The Fast Lady	Bulmer	
1963	Island of Love	Prof. Krumwitz	
1963	Dr. Crippen	Lord Chief Justice	
1963	The Three Lives of Thomasina	Mr. Dobbie	
1964	The Tomb of Ligeia	Kenrick	
1965	You Must Be Joking!	Angry Tweedles Club Member	Uncredited
1967	A Countess from Hong Kong	Clark	
1967	It!	Curator Trimingham	(final film role)
