= Firm Friends =

British television drama series

- Genre: Drama
- Written by: Lou Wakefield
- Directed by: Various
- Starring: Billie Whitelaw; Madhur Jaffrey; Zohra Sehgal; Michelle Holmes; Badi Uzzaman; Derek Fowlds
- Composer: Barrington Pheloung
- Country of origin: United Kingdom
- Original language: English
- No. of series: 2
- No. of episodes: 8

Production
- Executive producer: Scott Meek
- Producers: Jeff Rosenblatt (1992); Deirdre Kerr (1994)
- Production locations: Newcastle upon Tyne, Tyne and Wear, England, UK
- Running time: 52 minutes (including adverts)
- Production companies: Zenith Entertainment; Tyne Tees Television

Original release
- Network: ITV
- Release: 16 June 1992 – 18 August 1994

Firm Friends is a British drama series written and created by Lou Wakefield which was broadcast on ITV from 16 June 1992 to 18 August 1994. The series stars Billie Whitelaw as Rose Gutteridge and Madhur Jaffrey as Jayshree Kapoor. The show was produced by Zenith Entertainment in association with Tyne Tees Television for the ITV network.

== Cast ==
- Billie Whitelaw as Rose Gutteridge
- Madhur Jaffrey as Jayshree Kapoor
- Zohra Sehgal as Suvira Bhatia
- Michelle Holmes as Maggie Coles
- Badi Uzzaman as Puran Kapoor
- Derek Fowlds as John Gutteridge
- Alexander Morton as DI Hogg
- John McArdle as Peter Cresswell
- Tony Doyle as Michel Gutteridge
- Allen Mechen as Baz

== Series overview ==
Series overview
Series	Episodes	Originally released	
Series	Episodes	First released	Last released
1	4	16 June 1992	7 July 1992
2	4	28 July 1994	18 August 1994

== Episodes ==
=== Series 1 (1992) ===
Episodes aired on ITV on Tuesdays at 21:00.

No. overall	No. in series	Title	Original release date
1	1	Episode 1	16 June 1992
2	2	Episode 2	23 June 1992
3	3	Episode 3	30 June 1992
4	4	Episode 4	7 July 1992

=== Series 2 (1994) ===
Episodes aired on ITV on Thursdays at 21:00.

No. overall	No. in series	Title	Original release date
5	1	Episode 1	28 July 1994
6	2	Episode 2	4 August 1994
7	3	Episode 3	11 August 1994
8	4	Episode 4	18 August 1994
