= Ken Parry =

English actor (1930–2007)

- Born: Kenneth Parry; 20 June 1930; Wigan, Lancashire, England
- Died: 5 December 2007 (aged 77); London, England
- Occupation: Actor

Kenneth Parry (20 June 1930 – 5 December 2007) was an English actor, born in Wigan, Lancashire. Bald, portly and cherubic, Parry portrayed mainly comic character parts in a number of films, but was more prolific on television, in such series as The Army Game, The Avengers, The Baron, The Newcomers, Dixon of Dock Green, Nearest and Dearest, Love Thy Neighbour, Z-Cars, The Sweeney, Coronation Street, Hazell and Children's Ward.

== Selected filmography ==
- Friends and Neighbours (1959) - Sid
- Just for Fun (1963) - Lift Attendant
- The Liquidator (1965) - Tailor (uncredited)
- Out of the Unknown ('Time in Advance', episode) (1965) - Ballaskia
- The Brides of Fu Manchu (1966) - Hospital Receptionist (uncredited)
- The Taming of the Shrew (1967) - Tailor
- Otley (1968) - 3rd Businessman
- Start the Revolution Without Me (1970) - Dr. Boileau
- Spring and Port Wine (1970) - Pawnbroker
- Burke & Hare (1972) - Fat Man in Brothel
- That's Your Funeral (1972) - Railway Porter
- Bequest to the Nation (1973) - Victory's Cook (uncredited)
- Mistress Pamela (1974) - Parson
- Lisztomania (1975) - Rossini
- Joseph Andrews (1977) - Mr. Wilson's Companion
- Come Play with Me (1977) - Podsnap
- What's Up Nurse! (1978) - 1st Gay Young Man
- Hawk the Slayer (1980) - Thomas
- Lifeforce (1985) - Sykes (serial killer)
- The Rainbow Thief (1990) - Snow
