= Angharad Rees =

British actress (1944–2012)

Angharad Rees CBE
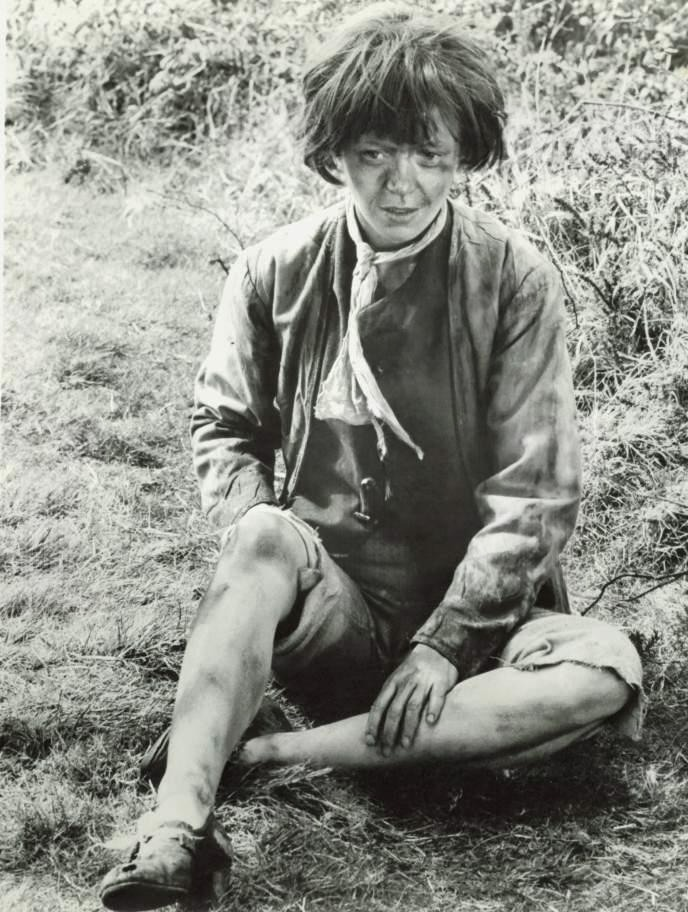
- Rees in Poldark (1977)
- Born: 16 July 1944; Edgware, Middlesex, England
- Died: 21 July 2012 (aged 68); London, England
- Education: Rose Bruford College
- Occupations: Actress, jewellery designer
- Spouses: Christopher Cazenove (m. 1973; div. 1994) David McAlpine (m. 2005)
- Children: 2
- Awards: Fellow, Royal Welsh College of Music & Drama

Angharad Rees (16 July 1944 – 21 July 2012) was a Welsh actress, best known for her British television roles during the 1970s and in particular her leading role as Demelza in the 1970s BBC TV costume drama Poldark.

== Early life ==
Rees was born to Welsh psychiatrist William Linford Rees and his wife Catherine Thomas.

When she was two, in 1946, her family moved from 13 Engel Park, Mill Hill, to Cardiff. Rees had two brothers and a sister. She attended the independent Commonweal Lodge School, then the Sorbonne in Paris for two terms and the Rose Bruford Drama College in Kent. She also studied at the University of Madrid and taught English in Spain before acting in repertory theatre in England.

Throughout her professional life her birth year was given as 1949, but she was born in 1944.

== Acting career ==
Rees made her television debut as a parlour maid in 1968 in an adaptation of Shaw's Man and Superman, appearing alongside Eric Porter and Maggie Smith. Other appearances in various television dramas and comedy series quickly followed, including The Way We Live Now, The Avengers, The Wednesday Play, Doctor in the House, Crown Court and Within These Walls.

Her most notable early roles included the daughter of Winston Churchill (played by Richard Burton) in The Gathering Storm, Lucy in Dennis Potter's television play Joe's Ark (both 1974), and as Celia in As You Like It opposite Helen Mirren (1978). Director Alan Bridges said of Rees' performance in Potter's television play that it was one of the finest performances he had ever witnessed.

She starred as the fictional murderous daughter of Jack the Ripper in the Hammer horror Hands of the Ripper (1971) and the star-studded film version of Under Milk Wood (1971) starring Richard Burton, Peter O'Toole and Elizabeth Taylor. Her other film roles included Jane Eyre (1970), To Catch a Spy (1971), The Love Ban (1973), Moments (1974), La petite fille en velours bleu (1978), The Curse of King Tut's Tomb (1980), the television miniseries Master of the Game (1984) and The Wolves of Kromer (1998), a British-made fantasy film narrated by Boy George.

Rees appeared in many stage productions in London's West End, including It's a Two-foot-six-inches Above-the-ground World (Wyndhams, 1970); The Picture of Dorian Gray (Lyric, Hammersmith, 1975); The Millionairess (Haymarket, 1978–79); Perdita in A Winter's Tale (Young Vic, 1981) and A Handful of Dust (Lyric, Hammersmith, 1982). Her other Shakespearean roles included Ophelia for the Welsh Theatre Company (1969) and Hermione at the Sherman Theatre, Cardiff (1985).

From 1975 to 1977 she played the lead role of Demelza in the BBC TV costume drama Poldark, the role with which she is most closely associated, appearing in all but the first episode. In 1983 she starred in another Cornish-set period drama The Forgotten Story, also based on a Winston Graham novel.

She toured in the Bill Kenwright production of Oscar Wilde's An Ideal Husband, directed by Peter Hall, with Michael Denison and Dulcie Gray and appeared regularly with John Mortimer in Mortimer’s Miscellany, his self-devised anthology of poetry and prose presented at theatres around Britain.

Later television work included the sitcom Close to Home (1989–90) and the sporting drama Trainer (1992).

== Honours ==
She was made a Fellow of the Royal Welsh College of Music & Drama. She also had a public house named after her in Pontypridd.

== Jewellery design ==
Following the death of her son Linford in 1999 she turned her back on acting and concentrated on her passion for jewellery design. Rees founded a jewellery design company, Angharad, based in Knightsbridge. Pieces that she designed and produced were featured in the film Elizabeth: The Golden Age (2007).

== Personal life ==
On 18 September 1973, Rees married the actor Christopher Cazenove, who had made his name at around the same time in The Regiment. They had two sons: Linford James (20 July 1974 – 10 September 1999) and Rhys William (born 1976). Linford was killed in a car accident on the M11 motorway in Essex while returning to collect his books from Cambridge University, where he had been awarded the degree of Master of Philosophy. Cazenove and Rees divorced in 1994 but remained close. Cazenove died from the effects of septicaemia in 2010.

Rees had a relationship with British actor Alan Bates. On 29 April 2005, Rees married David McAlpine of the McAlpine construction company at the Royal Hospital Chelsea, London.

== Death ==
Rees died of pancreatic cancer on 21 July 2012, at the age of 68.

A memorial service was held for her at St Paul's Church, Knightsbridge, London, on 27 September 2012. Downton Abbey creator Julian Fellowes led the tributes. He said "If there was one thing she was superb at, it was friendship. And not just sympathetic friendship, but hard-working, useful, practical assistance. She was anxious, I think, that she should not be defined, entirely, as the star of a popular series, as one half of a golden couple, as a mother and hostess, although she excelled in all of these. She wanted also to be remembered as a serious actress whose early career might have gone on to greatness had she not made the personal decision to change direction [by having a family]."

== Filmography ==
- Jane Eyre (1970) - Louise
- To Catch a Spy (1971) - Victoria
- Hands of the Ripper (1971) - Anna
- Under Milk Wood (1971) - Gossamer Beynon
- The Love Ban (1973) - Jackie
- Moments (1974) - Chrissy
- La petite fille en velours bleu (1978) - Macha
- The Wolves of Kromer (1998) - Mary
