= Affairs of the Heart (TV series) =

1983 British TV series

- Genre: Sitcom
- Starring: Derek Fowlds; Sarah Badel; Holly Aird
- Country of origin: United Kingdom
- Original language: English
- No. of episodes: 7

Production
- Running time: 30 minutes
- Production company: Granada Television

Original release
- Network: ITV
- Release: 23 August 1983 – 26 August 1985

Affairs of the Heart is a British sitcom that aired on ITV from 1983 to 1985. Starring Derek Fowlds, it was written by Paul Daneman. It was made for the ITV network by Granada Television.

== Cast ==
- Derek Fowlds - Peter Bonamy
- Sarah Badel - Jane Bonamy
- Elizabeth Anson - Rosemary Bonamy (pilot)
- Holly Aird - Rosemary Bonamy (series)

== Special guests ==
- Carol Barnes - Herself
- David Suchet - Peter Bonamy's Dad
- Peter Sallis - Himself
- Aidan Cook - Himself
- Nicholas Owen - Himself

== Background ==
Affairs of the Heart tells the semi-autobiographical tale of Peter Bonamy who has a heart attack. The writer, Paul Daneman, had suffered a heart attack while performing in the West End, and by chance he had been portraying a man suffering from a heart attack. During Daneman's recovery he had to delay acting again, and so took up writing. Affairs of the Heart was the result.

== Plot ==
After Peter Bonamy suffers a heart attack, and subsequently leaves hospital, he leads his life more carefully than before. His wife Jane and daughter Rosemary molly-coddle him, and he also attends a heart-attack survivors group. Bonamy, from the comfort of his south London home, finds himself doing little, especially as he can not even drive his Porsche.

Unusually for a television sitcom, there was no audience at the recordings.

== Episodes ==
=== Pilot (1983) ===
- Pilot (23 August 1983)

=== Series One (1985) ===
1. Episode One (22 July 1985)
2. Episode Two (29 July 1985)
3. Episode Three (5 August 1985)
4. Episode Four (12 August 1985)
5. Episode Five (19 August 1985)
6. Episode Six (26 August 1985)
