= The Wolves of Kromer =

- Directed by: Will Gould
- Written by: Charles Lambert; Matthew Read
- Produced by: Clare Erasmus line producer Charles Lambert producer
- Starring: Boy George (narrator); James Layton; Lee Williams; Margaret Towner; Rita Davies; Rosemarie Dunham; Kevin Moore; David Prescott; Angharad Rees; Matthew Dean; Leila Lloyd-Evelyn; Alastair Cumming
- Edited by: Carol Salter
- Distributed by: First Run Features
- Release date: 30 October 1998
- Running time: 82 minutes
- Language: English
- Budget: $14 million
- Box office: $524,864

The Wolves of Kromer is a 1998 gay-themed, allegorical fantasy film directed by Will Gould and based on a play of the same name by Charles Lambert.

In the small English village of Kromer, the local residents are angered by the wild parties held by the promiscuous 'wolves' who dwell on the edge of town. When a woman is killed by her servants, they manage to put the blame on the wolves, who soon find themselves hunted by an angry mob. Narrated by Boy George, the allegorical tale explores the origins and effects of homophobia.

The film debuted at the San Francisco International Lesbian & Gay Film Festival in 1998 but was released in theaters in December 2000.

== Cast ==
- Boy George as the narrator
- James Layton as Gabriel
- Lee Williams as Seth
- Margaret Towner as Doreen
- Rita Davies as Fanny
- Rosemarie Dunham as Mrs Drax
- Kevin Moore as the Priest
- David Prescott as Mark
- Angharad Rees as Mary
- Matthew Dean as Kester
- Leila Lloyd-Evelyn as Polly
- Alastair Cumming as Michael

== Crew ==
- Director - Will Gould
- Producer - Charles Lambert
- Screenplay adapted by Charles Lambert and Matthew Read
- Music composed and conducted by Basil Moore-Asfouri
- Line producer - Clare Erasmus
- Director of Photography - Laura Remacha
- Editor - Carol Salter
- Screen designer - Mark Larkin
- Costume designer - Shanti Freed
- Hair and make up - Caroline Rose
- Co-editors - Sotira Kyriacou & Conal Percy
- Production manager - Emma Einstein Hancox
- 1st assistant director - Greg Cole
- 2nd assistant director - Debbie Malynn
- Production co-ordinator - Caroline Luguet
- Focus pullers - Iwan reynolds, Douglas Gray & Martin Gooch
- Clapper loader - Clair Parkinson
- Dubbing mixer - Peter Hodges Amps
- Adr/foley mixer - Chris Trussler Amps
- Sound Editors - Peter Hodges Amps and Susan Lenny
- Foley artist - Peter Burgis
- Property Master - Edwin Lambert
- Special effects / prosthetics - Jonathan Joslin
- Pyrotechnic special effects supervisor - Steven Miller
- Costume assistant and supervisor - Elena d'Cruze
- Costume consultant - Nadine Hindi
- Hair and make-up artist - Sophie Oliver
- Art department assistant - Llewelyn Hancox
- Gaffer - Rasmus Bleekemolen
- Sparks - Paul Ullah, Tim Bonnebaight & Andy Munday
- Key grip - Simon Middleton
- Grip assistant - Ben Jackson
