= Linford Rees =

Welsh psychiatrist (1914–2004)

William Linford Llewellyn Rees CBE (24 October 1914 – 29 July 2004) was a Welsh psychiatrist, who was professor of psychiatry at St Bartholomew's Hospital, London, and president of the Royal College of Psychiatrists from 1975 to 1978.

Rees was born at Burry Port, the elder son of Edward Parry Rees, a Welsh-speaking teacher, and his wife Mary. He studied at Llanelli Grammar School. He obtained his medical degree from the Welsh National School of Medicine in 1938. After postgraduate education at the Maudsley Hospital in London, he developed a specialism in psychosomatic medicine and worked closely with Hans Eysenck. He later worked at Whitchurch Hospital in Cardiff and again at the Maudsley, before taking up his academic post at St Bartholomew's in 1996.

He married Catherine Thomas in 1940, and they had four children, including the actress Angharad Rees.

He was appointed CBE in 1978.
