= Mistress Pamela =

1974 British film by Jim O'Connolly

- British quad poster
- Directed by: Jim O'Connolly
- Written by: Jim O'Connolly
- Based on: the novel by Samuel Richardson
- Produced by: Jim O'Connolly
- Starring: Ann Michelle; Julian Barnes; Dudley Foster; Anna Quayle; Anthony Sharp
- Cinematography: Arthur Ibbetson
- Edited by: Fergus McDonell
- Music by: David Whitaker
- Production company: Merlot Film Productions
- Distributed by: Anglo-EMI (UK); Fanfare Films (USA)
- Release date: November 1973 (UK release)
- Running time: 91 min
- Country: United Kingdom
- Language: English

Mistress Pamela is a 1973 British sex comedy drama film directed by Jim O'Connolly and starring Ann Michelle, Dudley Foster, Anna Quayle and Anthony Sharp. It was written by O'Connolly loosely based on the 1740 novel Pamela, or Virtue Rewarded by Samuel Richardson.

== Plot ==
In the eighteenth century, Pamela, a servant girl in the household of Lord Devenish, must fight off the advances of her young master, a gentleman determined to have Pamela as his mistress.

== Cast ==
- Ann Michelle as Pamela Andrews
- Julian Barnes as Lord Robert Devenish
- Dudley Foster as Jonathan
- Anna Quayle as Mrs Jelks
- Anthony Sharp as Longman
- Rosemarie Dunham as Mistress Blimper
- Derek Fowlds as Sir Percy
- Ken Parry as Parson
- Fred Emney as Dr Livesey
- Frederic Abbott as John Andrews
- Marianne Stone as Katie

== Critical reception ==
The Monthly Film Bulletin wrote: "A fate worse than oblivion overtakes poor Pamela at last, and she loses her crusty literary virtue to this shabby article. In fact, she seems to have been made over with very little difficulty to the kind of fare that is calculated to raise a basic British guffaw or two: Lord Robert Devenish prowls through the unlavish period trappings of someone's stately home, occasionally rising in his peevish frustration to such witticisms as "Gad, I wish I were queer!"; Pamela Andrews eventually melts quite willingly at her master's suggestions of bed, while still fiercely holding out for a solid gold ring; and the protective Mrs. Jelks fair throbs with latent lesbian passion. Which is cruel enough; but a double indignity has been visited on Richardson: what the makers clearly had in mind was Carry On Tom Jones."

The Boston Globe wrote: "Producer-director-screenwriter Jim O'Connolly has promoted his movie (in its American premiere here) as another Tom Jones. It's not – in part because the material itself is more confined than Fielding's sprawling tapestry of country life, in part because O'Connolly's treatment is unambitious. He has ground out a straightforward 90-minute narrative, decorated at the dull spots with melodramatic score, straight-into-the-camera asides, and partial blackout of the concupiscence over which he scrawls, "We're being censored!!" He seems willing to sacrifice both stylistic consistency and substance for a momentary laugh."

Boxoffice wrote: "'The two principals, along with Anna Quayle, as the housekeeper romantically attached to the young girl herself, make of the adaptation of the Samuel Richardson classic novel a joy to behold, and something that will remind the more discerning American moviegoer of the calibre of Tom Jones."

Time Out wrote, "Richardson's 18th century classic Pamela clearly dredged up for its bawdy possibilities ... About all the film has in common with the original is a notable lack of humour."
