= Derek Fowlds =

English actor (1937–2020)

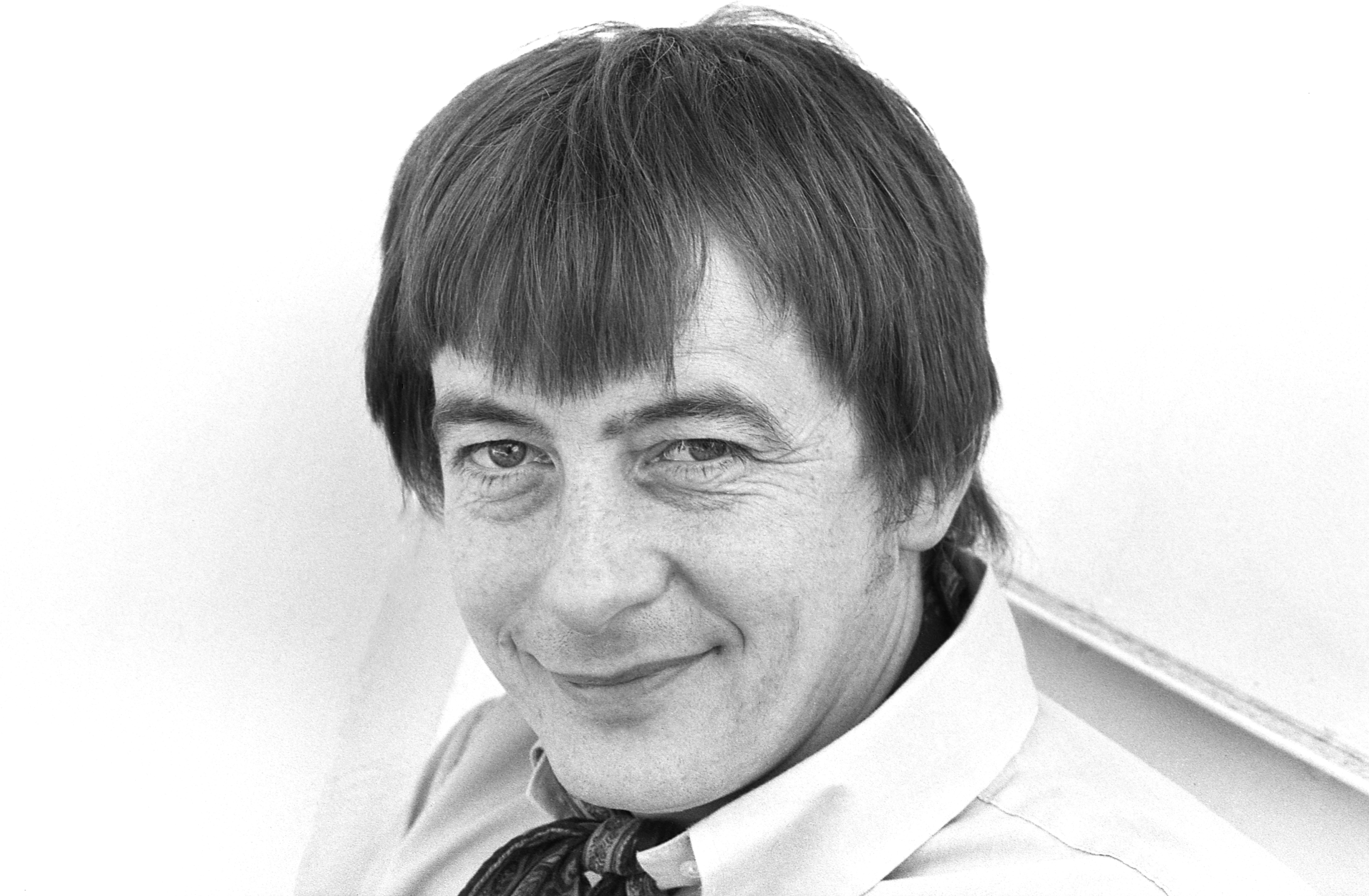
- Fowlds in 1974
- Born: Derek James Fowlds; 2 September 1937; Wandsworth, London, England
- Died: 17 January 2020 (aged 82); Bath, Somerset, England
- Occupations: Actor, presenter
- Years active: 1962–2020
- Spouse(s): Wendy Tory (m. 1963; div. 1973) Lesley Judd (m. 1974; div. 1978)
- Partner: Jo Lindsay (1976–2012; her death)
- Children: 2

Derek James Fowlds (2 September 1937 – 17 January 2020) was an English actor. He played "Mr Derek" in The Basil Brush Show (1969–1973), Bernard Woolley in the sitcom Yes Minister (1980–1984) and its sequel, Yes, Prime Minister (1986–1988), and Sgt Oscar Blaketon in Heartbeat (1992–2010).

== Early life ==
Derek James Fowlds was born on 2 September 1937 in Wandsworth, London, the son of Ketha Muriel (née Treacher) and James Witney Fowlds, a salesman. In early life he and his mother and sister went to live in Berkhamsted in Hertfordshire, at his maternal grandmother's home. There Fowlds attended Ashlyns School, a secondary modern school. After leaving school aged 15, Fowlds worked at a printer's firm as an apprentice and, as his National Service, spent two years in the RAF as a wireless operator.

== Career ==
After success in amateur acting, his teacher encouraged him to take it up as a career and Fowlds won a scholarship to RADA in 1958.

Fowlds made his debut on the West End stage in The Miracle Worker. He appeared in various film roles, including Tamahine (1963), East of Sudan (1964), Hotel Paradiso (1966), Frankenstein Created Woman (1967), The Smashing Bird I Used to Know (1969), Tower of Evil (1972) and Mistress Pamela (1974), before becoming familiar to British television child viewers as "Mr. Derek" in the popular British children's series The Basil Brush Show for four series, replacing Rodney Bewes as presenter.

Fowlds played Lord Randolph Churchill in the ATV series Edward the Seventh (1975). In Yes Minister and its sequel Yes, Prime Minister he played the naïve and callow Bernard Woolley alongside Paul Eddington's Jim Hacker and Nigel Hawthorne's Sir Humphrey Appleby.

From 1983 to 1985, Fowlds played the lead role in the sitcom Affairs of the Heart. He had a more sinister role in the 1990 political thriller Die Kinder. Fowlds then played curmudgeonly Oscar Blaketon in the long-running Yorkshire Television police drama nostalgia series Heartbeat for its entire 18-year run beginning in 1992. The character first appeared as the local police sergeant, then retired from the force (due to Oscar's ill health) and ran the post office before becoming a publican.

== Personal life ==
Fowlds married, and later divorced, Wendy Tory. He later married Blue Peter presenter and dancer Lesley Judd. They divorced in 1978. His partner of 36 years, Jo Lindsay, died in 2012. He was the father of two sons, including the actor Jeremy Fowlds. His autobiography, A Part Worth Playing, written with Michael Sellers, was published in 2015 by Fantom Publishing.

Fowlds died at Royal United Hospital in Bath on 17 January 2020 aged 82 from complications of heart failure and sepsis, which had followed pneumonia. His funeral was held at St Katharine's Church in Holt, Wiltshire, on 17 February 2020.

== Filmography ==
=== Film ===
Year	Title	Role	Notes
1962	The Loneliness of the Long Distance Runner	Borstal Inmate	Uncredited role
1962	We Joined the Navy	The Midshipman - Carson	
1963	Doctor in Distress	Medical Student Gillibrand	
1963	Tamahine	Bash	
1964	Hot Enough for June	Sun Bathing Man	
1964	East of Sudan	Murchison	
1966	Hotel Paradiso	Maxime	
1967	Frankenstein Created Woman	Johann	
1969	The Smashing Bird I Used to Know	Geoffrey	
1972	Tower of Evil	Dan Winthrop	
1973	Mistress Pamela	Sir Percy	
1976	The Copter Kids	Captain Peters	
1992	Over the Hill	Dutch	
1998	After Celia	Gilbert Bentley	
2006	Pigeon Post	John	Short film, also executive producer
2012	Run for Your Wife	Man in Hat	

=== Television ===
Year	Title	Role	Notes
1960	BBC Sunday-Night Play	The Family	Series 2; episode 7: "The Assassins"
1963	Love Story	Brookesey	Series 1; episode 5: "The Wedding of Smith Seven-Nine"
1963	ITV Play of the Week	Ian	Series 8; episode 38: "Breakthrough"
1963	Chips with Everything	252 Wingate (Chas)	Television film. Scenes from the Royal Court Theatre production
1964	The Protectors	Hughie	Episode 14: "The Reluctant Thief"
1964	The Villains	Johnny	Series 2; episode 3: "Victim"
1964	Armchair Theatre	Richard Racey	Series 5; episode 4: "Old Soldiers"
1965	Armchair Theatre	Tom Rogers	Series 5; episode 12: "The Gaming Book"
1965	Gideon's Way	Tim Coles	Episode 26: "The Nightlifers"
1965	Cluff	Jake Winter	Series 2; episode 10: "The Husband"
1965	Love Story	Laurie	Series 3; episode 19: "The Sad Smile of the Mona Lisa"
1966	Marriage Lines	Neville	Series 5; episode 4: "Big Business"
1966	Take a Pair of Private Eyes	Ambrose Frayne	Episodes 1–6
1966	The Man in Room 17	Bruce	Series 2; episode 8: "Goddess of Love"
1966	Conflict	Captain Hawtrey	Episode: "Caste"
1967	The Solarnauts	Tempo	Short television film. Pilot for cancelled series: Cloud of Death
1967	Comedy Playhouse	Peter Clancy	Series 6; episode 8: "The Old Campaigner"
1968	Comedy Playhouse	Jimmy	Series 7; episode 2: "View by Appointment". Pilot for series: Wink to Me Only
1968	Z Cars	Ricky Harper	Series 6; episodes 119 & 120: "Some Girls Pick 'Em: Parts 1 & 2"
1968	Theatre 625	Custard Pie Expert	Series 5; episode 25: "The Year of the Sex Olympics"
1969	Fraud Squad	Derek Hollister	Series 1; episode 1: "Turbot on Ice"
1969	Dr. Finlay's Casebook	Malcolm Cannock	Series 7; episode 25: "The Cheap Departed"
1969	Who-Dun-It	Septimus Fry	Episode 11: "Murder Goes to School"
1969, 1971	The Liver Birds	Peter Crawford	Series 1; episode 5, & series 2; episode 2
1969–1973	The Basil Brush Show	Mr. Derek	Series 2–7; 64 episodes
1973	Armchair 30	Brian	Episode 9: "Captain Video's Story"
1974	ITV Sunday Night Theatre	Neil	Series 6; episode 8: "Only the Other Day"
1974	Thriller	Dicky	Series 3; episode 3: "Death to Sister Mary"
1975	After That, This	Various characters	Episodes 1–6
1975	Edward the Seventh	Lord Randolph Churchill	Mini-series; episode 7: "Dearest Prince"
1975	The Last of the Best Men	Henry	Television film
1975	Comedy Playhouse	Leonard	Series 15; episode 4: "Captive Audience"
1975	The Doll	Max Lerner	Episodes 1–3
1976	Clayhanger	Jimmy Orgreave	Episode 22: "Dartmoor"
1977	BBC2 Play of the Week	Hans von Dohnanyi	Series 1; episode 5: "True Patriot"
1977	Crown Court	Nicholas Higgins	Series 6; episodes 29 & 30: "Such a Charming Man: Parts 2 & 3"
1977	Crown Court	David Moston	Series 6; episodes 43–45: "Kiss and Tell: Parts 1–3"
1977	Beryl Reid	Himself	Series 1; episode 1
1978	Miss Jones and Son	Sam	Series 2; episode 3: "Will You Be My Wife?"
1978	Send in the Girls	Miles Filmer	Episode 3: "A Hardy Breed of Girl"
1978	Robin's Nest	Ricky Hart	Series 3; episode 2: "The Candidate"
1978	Rings on Their Fingers	Paul	Series 1; episode 5: "Wholly Deadlock"
1979	Strangers	Mike Winter	Series 2; episode 4: "Friends in High Places"
1979	My Son, My Son	Newbiggen	Mini-series; episode 8
1980–1984	Yes Minister	Bernard Woolley	Series 1–3; 22 episodes
1981	Cribb	Albert Moscrop	Series 2; episode 1: "Mad Hatter's Holiday"
1982	Minder	Meadhurst	Series 3; episode 1: "Dead Men Do Tell Tales"
1982	Triangle	'Mozz' Barker	Series 2; episodes 15, 16 & 19
1982	Strangers	Det. Insp. Ken Driver	Series 5; episode 5: "A Free Weekend in the Country"
1982	Play for Today	Hartley	Series 13; episode 4: "Intensive Care"
1982	The Funny Side of Christmas	Bernard Woolley	Christmas Special. Yes Minister sketch
1983, 1985	Affairs of the Heart	Peter Bonamy	Pilot & episodes 1–6
1983, 1987	Call My Bluff	Himself - Panellist	Series 18; episodes 19 & 20, & series 23; episodes 1 & 2
1986–1988	Yes, Prime Minister	Bernard Woolley	Series 1 & 2; 16 episodes
1988	Inspector Morse	Kurt Friedman	Series 2; episode 3: "The Settling of the Sun"
1989	Rules of Engagement	Oliver Davidson	Mini-series; episodes 1–6
1990	Boon	Jack Fentiman	Series 5; episode 11: "Best Left Buried"
1990	Die Kinder	Crombie	Episodes 1–6
1990–1991	Chancer	Michael Coley	Recurring role. Series 1 & 2; 6 episodes
1991	Van der Valk	Johan Kieft	Series 4; episode 4: "The Little Rascals"
1991	Screen Two	Cumbridge	Series 7; episode 11: "They Never Slept"
1991	Perfect Scoundrels	Watkinson	Series 2; episode 3: "The Carpetbaggers"
1992	The Darling Buds of May	Esmond	Series 2; episode 5: "The Season of Heavenly Gifts: Part 1"
1992–1994	Firm Friends	John Gutteridge	Series 1 & 2; 8 episodes
1992–2009	Heartbeat	Sergeant Oscar Blaketon	Series 1–18; 342 episodes
1994	Casualty	Mr. Croft	Series 8; episode 19: "Value for Money"
1994	Big Day Out	Himself - Guest	Episode: "Whitby" (available on YouTube)
1996	The Detectives	Derek Alsopp	Series 4; episode 2: "Fur Coat, No Knickers"
2001	Lily Savage's Blankety Blank	Himself - Panellist	Series 16; episode 17
2003	The Royal	Oscar Blaketon	Series 2; episode 1: "All at Sea"
2013	Casualty	Stan Cothern	Series 28; episode 2: "Once There Was a Way Home: Part One"
2017	Doctors	Frank Patterson	Series 19; episode 49: "Butterflies"
2017	Celebrity Antiques Road Trip	As himself	Series 7, Episode 14
