= Derek Francis =

English actor (1923–1984)

- In Carry On Loving (1970)
- Born: 7 November 1923; Brighton, Sussex, England
- Died: 27 March 1984 (aged 60); Wimbledon, London, England
- Occupation: Actor
- Known for: Carry On films

Derek Francis (7 November 1923 – 27 March 1984) was an English comedy and character actor.

== Biography ==
Francis was a regular in the Carry On film players, appearing in six of the films in the 1960s and 1970s. He appeared in The Tomb of Ligeia (1964), the last film in Roger Corman's Edgar Allan Poe series. He also took roles in several BBC adaptations of Charles Dickens novels. His last role was in the 1984 version of A Christmas Carol.

Other roles included parts in television series of the period such as Rising Damp, Bless Me, Father, Thriller, The Professionals, The Sweeney, Sherlock Holmes, The New Avengers, Danger Man, Jason King, Up Pompeii!, Wild, Wild Women, Coronation Street, and Z-Cars. He also appeared as the Emperor Nero, a comic turn in the early Doctor Who story entitled The Romans opposite William Hartnell. Possibly his most prominent role was as Father Bernard, the Master of Novices in Oh Brother!.

Among his stage roles was the title character in Cymbeline for the Old Vic in 1957.

Francis died of a heart attack in Wimbledon, London, at the age of 60.

== Selected filmography ==
- The Criminal (1960) as The Priest
- No Love for Johnnie (1961) as Frank
- Two Living, One Dead (1961) as Broms
- Never Back Losers (Edgar Wallace Mysteries) (1961) as R.R. Harris
- The Inspector (1962) – Detective Inspector
- Captain Clegg (1962) as Squire Anthony Cobtree
- Backfire! (1962) as Arthur Tilsley
- Heart to Heart (1962) as Sir John Dawson-Brown
- Master Spy (1963) as Police Inspector (uncredited)
- Bitter Harvest (1963) as Mr. Jones
- The Hi-Jackers (1963) as Jack Carter
- Farewell Performance (1963) as Superintendent Raven
- Smokescreen (1964) as Dexter's Doctor (uncredited)
- This Is My Street (1964) as Fingus
- The Verdict (1964) as Superintendent Brett
- Ring of Spies (1964) as Chief Supt. Croft
- Master Spy (1964) as Police Inspector (uncredited)
- The Comedy Man (1964) as Merryweather
- The Tomb of Ligeia (1964) as Lord Trevanion
- Doctor Who (1965) as Emperor Nero
- The Little Ones (1965) as Paddy
- Rasputin, the Mad Monk (1966) as Innkeeper
- Press for Time (1966) as Ernest Corcoran (alderman)
- The Forsyte Saga (1967) as Elderson
- Jules Verne's Rocket to the Moon (1967) as Puddleby
- Carry On Doctor (1967) as Sir Edmund Burke
- What's Good for the Goose (1969) as Harrington
- Carry On Camping (1969) as a Farmer
- Crossplot (1969) as Sir Charles Moberley
- Carry On Loving (1970) as The Bishop
- Scrooge (1970) as Charity Gentleman
- Man of Violence (1971) as Sam Bryant
- Say Hello to Yesterday (1971) as Park Keeper
- The Statue (1971) as Sanders
- Carry On Henry (1971) as The Farmer
- Carry On Matron (1972) as Arthur
- Carry On Abroad (1972) as Brother Martin
- Who Killed Lamb? (1974) as Octavius Lamb
- To the Devil a Daughter (1976) as Bishop
- Dickens of London (1976) as Stage Manager
- Jabberwocky (1977) as Bishop
- The Wicked Lady (1983) as Lord Kingsclere
- Pope John Paul II (1984) as Bishop Lec
- A Christmas Carol (1984) as Pemberton (final film role)
