= Emergency (1962 film) =

1962 film directed by Francis Searle

- Original film quad poster
- Directed by: Francis Searle
- Written by: Don Nicholl; Jim O'Connolly; Lewis Gilbert; Vernon Harris
- Produced by: Ronald Liles; Francis Searle
- Starring: Glyn Houston; Zena Walker; Dermot Walsh
- Cinematography: Walter J. Harvey
- Edited by: Jim Connock
- Music by: John Veale
- Production company: Butcher's Film Service
- Distributed by: Butcher's Film Distributors
- Release date: December 1962
- Running time: 60 minutes
- Country: United Kingdom
- Language: English

Emergency is a 1962 British second feature ('B') drama film directed by Francis Searle and starring Glyn Houston, Zena Walker and Dermot Walsh. It was written by Don Nicholl, Jim O'Connolly, Lewis Gilbert and Vernon Harris.

== Plot ==
A small girl is hit by a lorry and urgently needs a blood transfusion for a life-saving operation. Her blood group is extremely rare, and the Police locate the only three possible donors: an imprisoned murderer awaiting execution, a treasonous atomic scientist, and a football player about to play a crucial match.

== Cast ==
- Glyn Houston as Inspector Harris
- Zena Walker as Joan Bell
- Dermot Walsh as John Bell
- Colin Tapley as Dr. Lloyd
- Garard Green as Professor Graham
- Anthony Dawes as Sergeant Phillips
- Patrick Jordan as Jimmy Regan
- Edward Ogden as Tommy Day
- Helen Forrest as Mrs. Day
- Sidney Vivian as Shaw
- John Boxer as Prison Governor

== Production ==
The film is a remake of Emergency Call (1952). It was shot at Twickenham Studios and on location in west London. Sets were designed by art director Duncan Sutherland.

== Critical reception ==
The Monthly Film Bulletin wrote: "Bearing a strong resemblance to Butcher's ten-year-old Emergency Call, this film is as unlikely and complex as it was then. The characterisation, too, is improbable, with a convicted murderer, a professional footballer, and an atomic scientist who is the pawn of a foreign power making up the blood donors."

The Radio Times Guide to Films gave the film 2/5 stars, writing: "Francis Searle's anaemic little movie recreates the agony of an estranged couple and their young daughter in desperate need of a blood donor. Glyn Houston is the earnest Scotland Yard flatfoot looking for likely candidates while parents Zena Walker and Dermot Walsh look suitably in need of tranquillisers. Things get quite dramatic before the hour and the budget is up.
