= Lady Godiva Rides Again =

1951 British film by Frank Launder

- retitled reissue pressbook cover
- Directed by: Frank Launder
- Written by: Frank Launder; Val Valentine
- Produced by: Sidney Gilliat
- Starring: Pauline Stroud; Dennis Price; Diana Dors; Stanley Holloway
- Cinematography: Wilkie Cooper
- Edited by: Thelma Connell
- Music by: William Alwyn
- Production company: London Films
- Distributed by: British Lion Films
- Release date: 25 October 1951
- Running time: 90 minutes
- Country: United Kingdom
- Language: English
- Box office: £117,891 (UK)

Lady Godiva Rides Again (also known as Beauty Queen; U.S. title: Bikini Baby) is a 1951 British comedy film directed by Frank Launder and starring Pauline Stroud, George Cole and Bernadette O'Farrell. It was written by Launder and Val Valentine.

It concerns a small-town English girl who wins a local beauty contest by appearing as Lady Godiva, then decides to pursue a higher profile in a national beauty pageant and as an actress.

The film was released in the United States under its original title in 1953 by Carroll Pictures, then was re-released in the United States as Bikini Baby, to capitalize on the profile of supporting player Diana Dors, who was given star billing with the new title.

== Plot ==
On a rainy Sunday afternoon in Coventry Johnny takes his girlfriend to the cinema. In the intermission between films, as Johnny gets an ice-cream, she sees an advertisement on-screen asking for girls to compete for the position of Lady Godiva in the annual street festival. She decides she will enter.

== Cast ==
- Pauline Stroud as Marjorie Clark
- Bernadette O'Farrell as Janie
- George Cole as Johnny
- Stanley Holloway as Mr. Clark
- Gladys Henson as Mrs. Clark
- John McCallum as Larry Burns
- Dennis Price as Simon Abott
- Diana Dors as Dolores August
- Eddie Byrne as Eddie Mooney
- Kay Kendall as Sylvia Clark
- Cyril Chamberlain as Harry
- Lyn Evans as Vic
- Dora Bryan as publicity woman
- Sid James as Lew Beeson
- Richard Wattis as casting director
- Renée Houston as Beattie
- Arthur Howard as soap publicity man
- Michael Ripper as Joe, stage manager
- Dana Wynter as Myrtle Shaw
- Leslie Mitchell as TV interviewer
- Tommy Duggan as compere
- Felix Felton as councillor
- Anne Heywood as Dorothy Marlowe, beauty pageant contestant
- Alastair Sim as Hawtrey Murington (uncredited)
- Googie Withers as Susan Foster (uncredited)
- Trevor Howard as a cinema patron extra (uncredited)
- Joan Collins as beauty pageant contestant (uncredited)
- Ruth Ellis as beauty pageant contestant (uncredited)
- Jean Marsh as beauty pageant contestant (uncredited)

== Production ==
The film was originally to be called Beauty Queen.

It was inspired by the Miss Kent 1950 beauty competition held at Leas Cliff Hall in Kent. Frank Launder, joint producer of the film with Leslie Gilliatt, was one of the judges in the competition. The filmmakers reportedly tested over 500 women to play the lead role including Joan Collins and Audrey Hepburn, who was judged too thin.

The actor chosen was Pauline Stroud. Her only previous film experience was as Vera-Ellen's stand-in in Happy Go Lovely (1951). Collins was given a bit part. The movie was the film debut of Anne Heywood, then known as Violet Pretty, who had won a number of beauty contests.

It was the first time John McCallum, who was Australian, played an Australian in a British film. Kay Kendall was cast as Stroud's sister after Launder saw her in a BBC play; the film helped revive Kendall's career after London Town.

Filming took place in June–July 1951. The production filmed on location in Folkestone, Kent. The Leas Cliff Hall was used as the location for the beauty competition, and The Metropole was the setting for the seaside hotel hosting the Fascination Soap Pageant. Folkestone West station features in the film for the railway scenes where Marjorie Clark arrives and meets Dolores August and her consorts, Larry and Vic. The now closed Rotunda Amusement Park was also used for the scenes where Larry and Marjorie visit and go on rides.

Diana Dors appeared in a swimsuit in one scene. She shot two versions – one in a bikini for release in Europe, another in a more conservative swimsuit for release in America. American censors objected to the content of the film, including the revealing nature of outfits worn by Dors.

== Reception ==
The Monthly Film Bulletin wrote: "Launder and Gilliat showed in The Rake's Progress that they could put a cutting edge on a comedy, but they have not chosen to do so this time; the approach is broad, good humored and rather vulgar, while such satirical comment as there is tends to be driven home with a sledge hammer. The script mixes good jokes, bad jokes, old jokes, authentic character sketches and caricatures impartially, and the film in consequence lacks unity of conception and – although some individual scenes are neatly timed – pace. But the writing and handling are sufficiently inventive to provide a fair proportion of entertaining scenes, and the general impression is of vitality, if not of charm."

Kine Weekly wrote: "The picture is good fun, and what it lacks in sharpness it gains in the honesty and variety of its humour and, believe it or not, the soundness of its moral. ... Dennis Price hams convincingly as an unpleasant leading man, John McCallum is adequate as the stolid Australian hero, and Pauline Stroud, a wide-eyed innocent, looks the part as Marjorie. Stanley Holloway, George Coles and Gladys Henson are also prominent; but effective as they and the stars are, Alastair Sim, seen only for a few minutes, is ... the hit of the show."

Filmink said Dors "livens up every scene she appears in and her part is too small (she disappears in the second half); once again, the movie would have been better had Dors played the lead."
