= The Hi-Jackers =

1963 British film by Jim O'Connolly

- British quad poster
- Directed by: Jim O'Connolly
- Written by: Jim O'Connolly
- Produced by: John I. Phillips; Ronald Liles
- Starring: Anthony Booth
- Cinematography: Walter J. Harvey
- Edited by: Henry Richardson
- Music by: Johnny Douglas
- Production company: Butcher's Film Service
- Distributed by: Butcher's Film Distributors (UK)
- Release date: December 1963
- Running time: 69 min.
- Country: United Kingdom
- Language: English

The Hi-Jackers is a 1963 British black and white second feature ('B') crime thriller film written and directed by Jim O'Connolly, starring Anthony Booth and Jacqueline Ellis.

== Plot ==
Long-distance independent lorry driver Terry meets homeless and unemployed Shirley at a transport cafe and gives her a lift. His vehicle, carrying a valuable shipment of whisky, is then hijacked under cover of a fake road accident. Who tipped off the hijackers about the route Terry would take? Police Inspector Grayson investigates.

== Cast ==
- Anthony Booth as Terry McKinley
- Jacqueline Ellis as Shirley
- Derek Francis as Jack Carter
- Patrick Cargill as Inspector Grayson
- Glynn Edwards as Bluey
- David Gregory as Pete
- Harold Goodwin as Scouse
- Tony Wager as Smithy
- Arthur English as Bert
- Michael Beint as Forbes
- Tommy Eytle as Sam Reynolds
- Romo Gorrara as Joe
- Ronald Hines as Jim Brady
- Douglas Livingstone as Tim
- Marianne Stone as Lil

== Critical reception ==
Monthly Film Bulletin said: "One or two aspirations towards originality – Carter's proficiency as a cook, a gangster's almost prudish refusal to take advantage of Shirley's helplessness – cannot disguise the formulary nature of this crime melodrama. The plot is thin and unconvincing; the heroine is one of those tiresomely well-spoken young women whose bursts of spirit (she is not averse to moral blackmail) strike one as both incongruous and unsympathetic. The lorry-drivers are quite well characterised, and Derek Francis brings a touch of class to the gourmet-mastermind which seems, less aptly, to have spilled over into the film as a whole. For a struggling haulage contractor Terry has a remarkably luxurious apartment; there's something gratuitously 'snob', too, about Patrick Cargill's supercilious police inspector."

The Radio Times Guide to Films gave the film 2/5 stars, writing: "This low-budget crime thriller from the Butcher's studio is set in the rough-and-ready world of trucking. However, British lorry drivers don't have the cinematic glamour of their American counterparts, so identifying the familiar British faces – Anthony Booth (Tony Blair's father-in-law), Patrick Cargill, Glynn Edwards – is the main point of interest here."
