= Pauline Stroud =

British actress (1930–2022)

- Publicity Photo of Pauline Stroud
- Born: 21 March 1930; Tunbridge Wells, Kent, England
- Died: 11 August 2022 (aged 92)
- Occupation: Actress
- Years active: 1951–1972
- Height: 1.63 m (5 ft 4 in)

Pauline Stroud (21 March 1930 – 11 August 2022) was a British actress who was best known for her appearance in Lady Godiva Rides Again (1951).

== Early life and career ==
An only child, Stroud was born in Tunbridge Wells, Kent, to Leslie Stroud, an accountant, and Daisy (née Waters). She initially attended a convent school – until her mother suspected that she was being considered as a possible recruit to the sisterhood. Thereafter she was educated privately, and her lessons included ballet and horse riding.

Stroud was selected nation-wide from 200 other women (some say 500 screen-tested) for her first role, given as 'honey-haired, blue-eyed and 5 ft 4in tall'. She had been a dancing stand-in. She continued making movies until 1972.

Best known for her appearance in Lady Godiva Rides Again (1951), a film satire on beauty queens, Stroud was cast in the lead role over Audrey Hepburn, Diana Dors and Joan Collins.

== Personal life and death ==
Stroud died from cancer on 11 August 2022, at the age of 92. Her death was reported on 4 September. Never married, she was survived by four cousins, Lynnette, Michael, Susan and Linda.

== Filmography ==
Films
Year	Title	Role	Note
1959	The Heart of a Man	Barmaid	Uncredited
1959	Life in Emergency Ward 10	Nurse Vincent	
1958	Room 43	Maria	
1955	Simon and Laura	Mabel	TV movie
1953	Her Three Bachelors	Pamela Weston	
1951	Lady Godiva Rides Again	Marjorie Clark	

Television
Year	Title	Role	Note
1972	Dead of Night	Mary	Episode: Two in the Morning
1972	New Scotland Yard	WDC Fry	
1972	The Man Outside	Deborah	Episode: Murder Story
1970	Wicked Women	Lotte Saunders	Episode: Florence Maybrick
1969	The Beverly Hillbilles	Woman	Episode: Silver Dollar City Fair
1968	The Spanish Farm	Clerk	Episode: Paris
1966	Mogul	Margo	Episode: If You Can't Lick 'Em
1965	A World of Comedy	Miss Marple	Episode: Sanop 409
1965	The Sullivan Brothers	Myra	Episode: The Salvation Man
1964	The Hidden Truth	Liz Mason	Episode: The Boiler Suite Shape
1964	Story Parade	Barbara Bone	Episode: A Travelling Woman
1963	24-Hour Call	Receptionist	
1963	Ghost Squad	Jane Sinclair	Episode: The Big Time
1962	Drama 61-67	Gloria	
1962	Benny Hill		Episode: A Pair of Socks
1961	Citizen James	Flossie	Episode: The Rally
1961	Harpers West One	Jackie Webb	
1961	Playbox	Marigold Allen	
1961	A Life of Bliss	Peg	
1960	ITV Television Playhouse	Gloria	Episode: Who's Owen Stephens...?
1960	Theatre 70	Sally	Episode: Full Circle
1960	Skyport	Katie	
