= The Secret Tunnel =

1947 British film by William C. Hammond

- Directed by: William C. Hammond
- Screenplay by: William C. Hammond
- Produced by: Frank A. Hoare
- Starring: Anthony Wager; Ivor Bowyer; Thelma Rea
- Cinematography: A.T. Dinsdale
- Edited by: Eric Hodges
- Music by: Norman Demuth
- Production companies: Merton Park; G.B. Children's Entertainment FIlms
- Release date: 1947
- Running time: 37 minutes
- Country: United Kingdom
- Language: English

The Secret Tunnel is a 1947 British children's comedy-drama film directed by William C. Hammond and starring Anthony Wager, Ivor Bowyer and Thelma Rea. The screenplay was by Hammond based on the novel by Mary Cathcart Borer. It was produced by Frank A. Hoare for Cinema Clubs for Boys and Girls, a predecessor of the Children's Film Foundation, and made by Merton Park/G.B. Children's Entertainment FIlms.

== Plot ==
Antiques collector Roger Henderson returns from abroad to his stately home to find a valuable Rembrandt painting missing. His son Roger, together with the handyman's son John, decide to solve the mystery. It turns out that the housekeeper is in cahoots with a gang of thieves, who are using a secret tunnel leading to the house to escape with the stolen goods. Roger and John take on the criminals and bring them to justice.

== Cast ==
- Anthony Wager as Roger Henderson
- Ivor Bowyer as John Wilson
- Thelma Rea as Mrs Matthews
- Murray Matheson as Mr Henderson
- Frank Henderson as Mr Harvey
- John Sullivan as Inspector Bell
- Gerald Pring as Wilson
- Michael Kelly as Slim
- John May as Nipper

== Reception ==
The Monthly Film Bulletin wrote: "This excellently made film is ideal entertainment for children, with plenty of mystery and excitement pleasantly devoid of the "horrific" element."

Kine Weekly wrote: "G.B. Children's Entertainment Films have made a number of Boys' Clubs pictures lately and this is not the first to turn out equally suitable [for] adult audiences. The secret is natural character drawing, sure timing, wholesome atmosphere and, above all, a capacity to appeal to the boy in every man. Jolly adventure farce, it has the average full quota fill-up beaten to a frazzle. ... Wholesome and exciting story, competent and unaffected acting by young players, picturesque surroundings and thrilling finale."

Picture Show described it as "a lively comedy-drama."

In British Sound Films: The Studio Years 1928–1959 David Quinlan rated the film as "average", writing: "Competent children's film; lots of mystery."
