= The Tomb of Ligeia =

1964 horror film by Roger Corman

- Theatrical release poster
- Directed by: Roger Corman
- Screenplay by: Robert Towne
- Based on: "Ligeia" by Edgar Allan Poe
- Produced by: Pat Green
- Starring: Vincent Price; Elizabeth Shepherd
- Cinematography: Arthur Grant
- Edited by: Alfred Cox
- Music by: Kenneth V. Jones
- Color process: Eastmancolor
- Production company: Alta Vista Productions
- Distributed by: Anglo-Amalgamated; Warner-Pathé
- Release date: November 1964 (United Kingdom)
- Running time: 81 minutes
- Country: United Kingdom
- Language: English
- Budget: $150,000

The Tomb of Ligeia is a 1964 American-British horror film directed by Roger Corman. Starring Vincent Price and Elizabeth Shepherd, it tells of a man haunted by the spirit of his dead wife and her effect on his second marriage. The screenplay by Robert Towne was based upon the short story "Ligeia" by American author Edgar Allan Poe and was the last of Corman's series of films loosely based on the works of Poe. Tomb of Ligeia was filmed at Castle Acre Priory and other locations with a mostly British cast.

== Plot ==
A funeral takes place at the side of Castle Acre Priory. The casket has a window allowing the face of a beautiful young woman to be seen. A black cat jumps on the coffin and seems to steal the soul of the woman.

The widower, Verden Fell is both mournful about and feels threatened by the death of his wife, Ligeia. He had sensed her soul's reluctance to die and was concerned about her near-blasphemous statements about God (she was an atheist). Alone and troubled by an eye condition that requires him to wear dark glasses, Fell shuns the world.

By accident, back at the graveside, he meets a headstrong young woman, Rowena, who pursues him even though she is apparently betrothed to an old friend, Christopher Gough. Against Fell's better judgement, he marries Rowena. Ligeia's spirit seems to haunt their mansion, previously a medieval abbey, and nocturnal visions and the sinister presence of a cat (which may be inhabited by the spirit of Ligeia) distress Rowena. The cat, who first appears at Ligeia's burial, wounds and appears to attempt to kill Rowena several times and Fell unsuccessfully orders its destruction. Ultimately he must face the spirit of Ligeia and resist her or perish.

The climax of the film takes place when Fell has a showdown with Ligeia, now in the form of a cat. Fell is blinded by Ligeia, but gets the upper hand and strangles the cat, while the tomb around him burns down, due to an accident. Fell and Ligeia perish and Gough and Rowena start a new life together.

== Cast ==
- Vincent Price as Verden Fell
- Elizabeth Shepherd as Rowena Trevanion/Ligeia
- John Westbrook as Christopher Gough
- Derek Francis as Lord Trevanion
- Oliver Johnston as Kenrick
- Richard Vernon as Dr. Vivian
- Frank Thornton as Peperel the butler
- Ronald Adam as clergyman
- Denis Gilmore as livery boy
- Penelope Lee as maid

== Production ==
=== Script ===
Because the original story was so short, Towne read all of Poe's work and decided to expand on Poe's themes, particularly mesmerism and necrophilia. The film would be about a woman who had hypnotised the protagonist with the result he makes love to her dead body under post-hypnotic suggestion. "Literally being controlled by someone who was dead," said Towne, "which is a gruesome notion but perfectly consistent with Poe." Towne says he "tried to have my cake and eat it too" by writing a script where the events could be explained both naturally (via post-hypnotic suggestion) and supernaturally (by possession). Towne later said "Roger and I were really a classic mismatch. It was very painstaking, the script for Tomb of Ligeia. In fact I worked harder on... [that] than on anything I think I have ever done. And I still like that screenplay. I think it's good."

=== Casting ===
Roger Corman was initially reluctant to use Vincent Price in the lead role, worrying he was too old for a character who was 25 to 30 years old; his preference was for Richard Chamberlain.

Towne later said the film "was a little dull. I think it would have been better if it had been with a man who didn't look like a necrophiliac to begin with... I love Vincent. He's very sweet. But, going in, you suspect that Vincent could bang cats, chickens, girls, dogs, everything. You just feel that necrophilia might be one of his Basic Things. I'd felt the role called for an almost unnaturally handsome guy who the second wife could easily fall in love with. There should also be a sense of taboo about the close tie he had with his first wife – as though it was something incestuous, two halves of the same person."

However, Price's casting was a condition of AIP investing in the film, and Corman relented. Robert Towne had specifically requested Price not be cast, and when Corman broke the news he told the screenwriter, "Don't worry, Bob, I've got Marlene Dietrich's make-up man!" Corman ended up giving Price a wig and using more makeup on him than usual to make him look younger. Nevertheless, he later remarked that Price's casting still "did change the orientation of the film quite a bit."

=== Filming ===
The film was shot in England as a co production between AIP and Anglo-Amalgamated.

== Release ==
The Tomb of Ligeia was released in the United Kingdom in November 1964. It was later distributed in the United States in January 1965. Roger Corman later said that "all of the Poe films made money, but Tomb of Ligeia made the least amount. I think it was because the series was just running out of steam and also because it was overly complicated."

Corman later gave Martin Scorsese permission to use a clip from the film in Mean Streets.

== Reception ==
=== Critical ===
The Monthly Film Bulletin wrote:

Though Corman's admirers are unlikely to be too disappointed by his new film, one may still regret the loss of narrative clarity which featured so strongly in The Masque of the Red Death. The crowded metamorphoses of the last ten minutes make for a confused climax. Moreover the blinding of Fell, the destruction of the abbey by fire, the blood-stained embraces of the doomed man and his ghostly beloved, are all too reminiscent of earlier Corman films – too much, in fact, of a formulary, melodramatic hotchpotch. Luckily there are ample compensations. The earlier intimations of horror are put over casually and briskly, notably where the black cat is concerned. Much of the incident is genuinely strange – the cat climbing the bell-tower with Fell's dark glasses gripped between its teeth; the dream in which Rowena is smothered by Ligeia's black tresses. Technically the film is less accomplished than The Masque of the Red Death, but it is still better – certainly more serious and naturalistic – than Corman's Hollywood Poe cycle. Price is a solemn, rather pained Verden Fell; Elizabeth Shepherd, who bears an uncanny resemblance to Honor Blackman, is more mature, positive and husky than any previous Corman heroine. She also doubles adequately for the sinister Ligeia who, the film hints, must have been around at the time the Pyramids were built. The chances are she's still around. At the end of the film one doesn't give a penny for Christopher's chances of a happy future with a girl who only looks like Rowena.

Howard Thompson in The New York Times of 6 May 1965 wrote:

Mr Corman at least cares about putting Mr Poe — or at least some of the master's original ideas — on the screen. If they are frankly made to be screamed at, they are not to be sneezed at. Mr Price still hams it up, front and center, but these low-budget shockers generally evoke a compelling sense of heady atmosphere and coiled doom in their excellent Gothic settings, arresting color schemes and camera mobility ... Mr Corman has made stunning, ambient use of his authentic setting, an ancient abbey in Norfolk, England, and the lovely countryside. The picture is not nearly as finished as Masque of the Red Death ... But the Corman climate of evil is as unhealthy and contagious as ever.

Roger Corman later said he thought the film was "one of the best Poe pictures and Vincent's performance in the film was very good. It was simply a matter of age."

== Comic book adaptation ==
- Dell Movie Classic: Tomb of Ligeia (April–June 1965)

== See also ==
- Edgar Allan Poe in television and film

== Notes ==
- P.J.D. (December 1964). "Tomb of Ligeia, The". Monthly Film Bulletin. Vol. 31, no. 371. British Film Institute.
- Brady, John (1981). The Craft of the Screenwriter.
- Lampley, Jonathan Malcolm (2009). "The Tomb of Ligeia (1964)". In Swehla, Susan; Svehla, Gary J. (eds.). Vincent Price. Midnight Marquee Press, Inc. ISBN 978-1887664219.
