= Alf's Baby =

1953 British film by Maclean Rogers

- Opening titles
- Directed by: Maclean Rogers
- Produced by: John Harlow
- Starring: Jerry Desmonde; Pauline Stroud; Olive Sloane
- Cinematography: Ted Lloyd
- Edited by: Clifford Turner
- Production company: ACT Films
- Distributed by: Adelphi Films
- Release date: February 1953
- Running time: 75 minutes
- Country: United Kingdom
- Language: English

Alf's Baby (also known as Her Three Bachelors) is a 1953 British second feature ('B') comedy film directed by Maclean Rogers and starring Jerry Desmonde, Pauline Stroud and Olive Sloane. It was written by A.P. Dearsley based on his 1953 play It Won’t Be a Stylish Marriage, and made by ACT Films.

== Preservation status ==
The British Film Institute National Archive holds the film.

== Plot ==
Three bachelors raise a baby who grows into an eligible young woman.

== Cast ==
- Jerry Desmonde as Alf Donkin
- Pauline Stroud as Pamela Weston
- Olive Sloane as Mrs. Matthews
- Peter Hammond as Tim Barton
- Sandra Dorne as Enid
- Roy Purcell as Sergeant Bob Mackett
- C. Denier Warren as Cedric Donkin
- Mark Daly as Will Donkin
- Roddy Hughes as Mr. Prendergast
- Sebastian Cabot as Osmonde
- Michael Ripper as Mike

== Reception ==
The Monthly Film Bulletin wrote: "A simple little comedy played with amateurish verve by a hard working cast; some laughs."

Kine Weekly wrote: "Artless domestic comedy, set in a lower middle-class frame. ... It gets a few laughs here and there, but is a little too unpretentious for most modern audiences. Very moderate "second." ... The picture visits a dance hall and contains a few street sequences, but otherwise it hands out its time-honoured stage gags in somewhat cramped shop parlour interiors. Old-timers Jerry Desmonde, C. Denier Warren, Mark Daly and Olive Sloane act effectively as Alt, Cedric, Will and Mrs. Mathews respectively, but their resourceful teamwork is offset by the amateurish acting of Pauline Stroud and Roy Purcell as Pamela and Bob.

Picture Show wrote: "Simple domestic comedy ... It is quite brightly acted and very simply set."

The Daily Film Renter wrote: "However much patrons of industrial halls enjoy a flyer into high life, they always remain loyal to the earthy British picture which mixes laughs with sighs, comedy with pathos in the 'Why, it's just like us' formula. This is one such. It never overplays its unpretentious content. Its characters never put on side. And, as the laughs come faster and more frequent than the occasional lump in the throat, every patron is guaranteed a good time. Here the leading players are genial people whom one takes to one's heart on sight, all except youthful smart aleck wrong 'un Tim Barton, splayed with impudent assurance by Peter Hammond."
