= Crooks and Coronets =

1969 British film by Jim O'Connolly

- Original UK quad poster by Tom Chantrell
- Directed by: Jim O'Connolly
- Written by: Jim O'Connolly
- Produced by: Herman Cohen; Clifford Parkes
- Starring: Telly Savalas; Warren Oates; Dame Edith Evans; Cesar Romero; Harry H. Corbett
- Cinematography: Desmond Dickinson
- Edited by: Martin Charles
- Music by: Patrick John Scott
- Production company: Herman Cohen Productions
- Distributed by: Warner-Pathé (UK)
- Release date: 2 April 1969 (UK)
- Country: United Kingdom
- Language: English

Crooks and Coronets (U.S. title: Sophie's Place) is a 1969 British crime comedy film written and directed by Jim O'Connolly and starring Telly Savalas, Edith Evans, Warren Oates, Cesar Romero and Harry H. Corbett.

== Story ==
Two recently released convicts, Herbie Haseler and Marty Miller, go to work for New York mob boss Nick Marco. Marco sends them to England to set up the robbery of a large English mansion. The mansion is owned by the kindly and elderly eccentric, Lady Sophie Fitzmore, who plans to pass the mansion and its priceless treasures on to her loyal nephew, Freddie Fritzmore. Sophie owns a full grown male lion named 'Bo-Bo' who is somewhat domesticated but nevertheless guards a portion of the estate. Herbie and Marty tour Lady Sophie's mansion and ingratiate themselves with the old lady. She invites them to live in the mansion with her, a windfall that will help them plan the robbery. Herbie and Marty also meet Frank Finley, the London mob contact for Nick Marco. Herbie, Marty and Finley plan the robbery and the escape route, and make general arrangements for Marco's arrival for the heist. Over time, Herbie and Marty grow fond of Lady Sophie, Freddie, and their coterie of servants. Herbie is even heard saying to Marty "You Can't Double-Cross Your Friends Marty!". At the last minute, they decide they cannot go through with the robbery. Their fondness for Sophie prompts them to prevent Nick and Frank Finley from committing the robbery.

== Flying ==
The Fokker E.III Eindecker replica seen in the film was built and flown by Douglas Bianchi. He had previously worked on period films involving vintage aircraft such as Those Magnificent Men in Their Flying Machines and The Blue Max.

== Cast ==
- Telly Savalas as Herbie Haseler
- Edith Evans as Lady Sophie Fitzmore
- Warren Oates as Marty Miller
- Cesar Romero as Nick Marco
- Harry H. Corbett as Frank Finley
- Nicky Henson as Lord Freddie Fitzmore
- Hattie Jacques as Mabel
- Vickery Turner as Annie
- Arthur Mullard as Perce
- Frank Thornton as Cyril
- Thorley Walters as Hubbard
- Jeremy Young as Reilly
- Leslie Dwyer as Henry
- Clive Dunn as Basil
- David Bauer as Jack
- Ivor Dean as Bellows
- David Lodge as Police officer

== Critical reception ==
The Monthly Film Bulletin wrote: "Rather too obviously designed with one eye on the American market, where the eccentricities of the British aristocracy are presumably still considered a strong selling point, this mildly amusing comedy is so sedately paced that even its splendidly idiotic climax is not nearly as funny as it should have been. Once the Americans are established in the stately home (which in itself takes up about a third of the film), the script can find little for them to do but sit back and watch their zany dowager lady hostess at work – the sortie to the London gambling club, for instance, serves no purpose other than to show that the lady is a dab hand at cards. The finale, with the crooks repulsed by a concerted attack involving cross-bows, a lion, and Edith Evans at the controls of a vintage German plane, is in the best Ealing tradition and almost makes up for the periods of slack. But the rest, despite amiable performances from all concerned, is very lame."

The Radio Times wrote: "strange casting – a sort of Carry On meets The Dirty Dozen – gives the film a certain interest, not to mention eccentricity...but the overall tone is far too frantic and full of those terribly dated, Swinging Sixties fads and fashions."

Allmovie described the film as a "delightful crime comedy."

Sky Movies wrote, "at times, the pace is as sedate as the English aristocracy portrayed: but the magnificently lunatic climax is worth waiting for, as crooks ... are finally repulsed by a concerted counter-attack involving crossbows, a lion, and Edith Evans at the controls of a vintage German plane. It has to be said that Dame Edith has no trouble in beating the Americans at the acting game, either."

== See also ==
- Candleshoe (1977)
