= Backfire! (1962 film) =

1962 British film by Paul Almond

- Theatrical release poster
- Directed by: Paul Almond
- Screenplay by: Robert Stewart
- Story by: Edgar Wallace
- Produced by: Jack Greenwood
- Starring: Alfred Burke Zena Marshall Oliver Johnston
- Cinematography: Bert Mason
- Edited by: Derek Holding
- Music by: Bernard Ebbinghouse
- Production company: Merton Park Studios
- Distributed by: Anglo-Amalgamated
- Release date: 30 April 1962
- Running time: 59 minutes
- Country: United Kingdom
- Language: English

Backfire! (also known as Backfire) is a 1962 second feature British film directed by Paul Almond and starring Alfred Burke, Zena Marshall and Oliver Johnston. Part of the long-running series of Edgar Wallace Mysteries films made at Merton Park Studios, it was based on a story by Edgar Wallace.

== Plot ==
Long-established cosmetics company Venetia Beauty Preparations is in serious financial trouble, having been taken from success to near-ruin by the unscrupulous actions of the devious Mitchell Logan and his wife Pauline, who have inveigled their way to become business partners of the elderly founder Bernard Curzon. Against Curzon's wishes, Logan engages the services of a professional arsonist to burn the factory down, intending to claim on the insurance. But his plan goes horribly wrong.

== Cast ==
- Alfred Burke as Mitchell Logan
- Zena Marshall as Pauline Logan
- Oliver Johnston as Bernard Curzon
- Noel Trevarthen as Jack Bryce
- Suzanne Neve as Shirley Curzon
- Derek Francis as Arthur Tilsley
- John Cazabon as Willy Kyser
- Madeleine Christie as Hannah Chenko
- Claire Neilson as Valentina Chenko (credited as Claire Isbister)
- Frank Hawkins as Inspector Fletcher
- Donald Eccles as Hargreaves
- Melody O'Brian as Thelma
- Edwin Brown as commissionaire
- Beresford Williams as nightwatchman
- Bernard Kay as fire chief
- Philip Ray as coroner
- Audrey Nicholson as maid in hotel
- Terry Bale as van man
- Stuart Hutchinson as fireman

== Critical reception ==
The Monthly Film Bulletin wrote: "Economical thriller in the Edgar Wallace series, adequately acted and presented."
