= Scotland Yard (TV series) =

1960 British crime television series

- Genre: Police procedural
- Written by: Robert Barr
- Directed by: David Rose
- Country of origin: United Kingdom
- Original language: English
- No. of series: 1
- No. of episodes: 13

Production
- Producer: David Rose
- Production company: BBC

Original release
- Network: BBC One
- Release: 12 April – 12 July 1960

Scotland Yard is a thirteen-part British crime television series which aired on the BBC in 1960. Each episode was a dramatised documentary of a real-life case tackled by Scotland Yard. It should not be confused with the contemporary film series of the same title, which was made between 1953-1961.

Actors who appeared in episodes of the show include Glyn Houston, Lee Montague, David Lyn, Nigel Stock, Lloyd Lamble, Norman Mitchell, John Barrie, Brian Wilde, Michael Robbins, Frederick Piper, Geoffrey Chater, Patrick Newell, Roddy Hughes, Anthony Sagar, Mary Hignett, Martin Boddey, Bryan Pringle, Peter Cellier, Patrick Cargill, Jill Bennett, Rita Webb, Vanda Godsell, Marianne Stone, John Hamblin, and Michael Ripper.

== Episode list ==
- Night Beat
- Information Received
- Hit and Run
- Robbery with Violence
- Complaints Against the Police
- Organised Crime
- Robbery on the A5
- Interpol
- Reasonable Doubt
- Special Duty
- Used in Evidence
- Cheap at the Price
- Protection

== Bibliography ==
- Cooke, Lez. Troy Kennedy Martin. Manchester University Press, 2007.
