= The Hypnotist (1957 film) =

1957 British film by Montgomery Tully

- UK poster
- Directed by: Montgomery Tully
- Written by: Montgomery Tully
- Based on: a play by Falkland Cary
- Produced by: Alec C. Snowden
- Starring: Paul Carpenter; Patricia Roc; Roland Culver
- Cinematography: Phil Grindrod
- Edited by: Geoffrey Muller
- Music by: Trevor Duncan
- Production company: Merton Park Studios
- Distributed by: Anglo-Amalgamated Film Distributors (UK)
- Release date: 29 July 1957 (UK)
- Running time: 89 minutes
- Country: United Kingdom
- Language: English

The Hypnotist (U.S. title Scotland Yard Dragnet) is a 1957 British thriller film directed by Montgomery Tully and starring Paul Carpenter, Patricia Roc and Roland Culver. It was written by Tully based on a 1956 play by Falkland Cary.

== Plot ==
Pilot Valentine 'Val' Neal is injured during a test flight and after suffereing mental blackouts is treated by psychiatrist Dr. Francis Pelham, a friend of Neal's fiancée Mary Foster. Pelham has a secret wife, and tries to use hypnotism to compel Neal to murder her. Unable to persuade Neal, Perlham kills his wife himself, and then tries to pin the blame on Neal. With Mary's help Neal is able to prove his innocence.

== Cast ==
- Roland Culver as Dr. Francis Pelham
- Patricia Roc as Mary Foster
- Paul Carpenter as Valentine 'Val' Neal
- William Hartnell as Inspector Ross
- Gordon Needham as Detective Sergeant Davis
- Edgar Driver as Atkins, the porter
- Tom Tann as Wang, the houseboy
- Ellen Pollock as Miss Barbara Barton
- Robert Sansom as senior test flight official
- Martin Wyldeck as Dr. Bradford
- John Serret as Dr. Martin
- Oliver Johnston as Dr. Kenyon
- Kay Callard as jazz club blonde
- Tim Fitzgerald as Val as a boy
- Mary Jones as Val's mother

== Critical reception ==
Kinematograph Weekly called it "a darned good British programmer".

The Monthly Film Bulletin wrote: "The narrative of this murder mystery is so hung about with rambling and unconnected sub-plots as to become hopelessly confused. A most inept performance by Paul Carpenter only adds to the muddle; but there is some good playing by Kay Callard and Ellen Pollock."

Picture Show wrote: "Competently directed and acted, it has a plot that grips the interest throughout."

The Radio Times wrote "Irish-born director Montgomery Tully was one of the key figures in the British B-movie industry during the 1950s and 1960s. This is one of his better efforts, as psychiatrist Roland Culver attempts to frame disturbed test pilot Paul Carpenter for the murder of his wife. Culver does a nice line in evil manipulation and Patricia Roc is typically spirited as the girlfriend standing by her man."

TV Guide wrote: "the film drags on and on, going nowhere and taking too long to get there."

In British Sound Films: The Studio Years 1928–1959 David Quinlan rated the film as "mediocre", writing: "Unlikely tale does ramble on."
