= The Incredible Sarah =

1976 film

- Film poster
- Directed by: Richard Fleischer
- Written by: Ruth Wolff
- Produced by: Helen M. Strauss; Douglas Twiddy
- Starring: Glenda Jackson; Daniel Massey; Douglas Wilmer; David Langton; Simon Williams
- Cinematography: Christopher Challis
- Edited by: John Jympson
- Music by: Elmer Bernstein
- Production company: Reader's Digest Films
- Distributed by: Cinema International Corporation
- Release date: 5 November 1976
- Running time: 106 minutes
- Country: United Kingdom
- Language: English

The Incredible Sarah is a 1976 British historical biographical drama film directed by Richard Fleischer and starring Glenda Jackson and Daniel Massey. It was written by Ruth Wolff and presents a dramatization of the acting career of Sarah Bernhardt.

== Plot ==
Beginning in 1863, the film dramatises events in the personal life and career of Sarah Bernhardt, through her unsteady beginnings, through her job as a nurse in the Franco-Prussian War, to becoming the star of Parisian theatre.

== Cast ==
- Glenda Jackson as Sarah Bernhardt
- Daniel Massey as Victorien Sardou
- Yvonne Mitchell as Mam'selle
- Douglas Wilmer as Montigny
- David Langton as Duc De Morny
- Simon Williams as Henri de Ligne
- John Castle as Damala
- Edward Judd as Jarrett
- Rosemarie Dunham as Mrs. Bernhardt
- Peter Sallis as Thierry
- Bridget Armstrong as Marie
- Margaret Courtenay as Madame Nathalie
- Maxwell Shaw as Fadinard
- Patrick Newell as Major
- Neil McCarthy as Sergeant

== Reception ==
The Monthly Film Bulletin wrote: "An incredible hodge-podge, which never achieves an intellectual grip on its subject or her significance, but does maintain a rigid directorial distance – thus missing out as well on all the usual excitements of the biopic. One of the characteristics of even Richard Fleischer's more intelligent projects is his inability to find a style which illuminates his subject rather than imprisoning it; thus the scrappy Mandingo is calcified melodrama, frozen in the act of becoming social critique. Here, where Fleischer clearly has no strong viewpoint or thesis to push, the stiff objectivity encloses Sarah Bernhardt in a kind of creaking mummery – even while celebrating her rebellion against the stuffy theatre of the second Empire."

Variety wrote: "The Incredible Sarah represents another achievement of Glenda Jackson, starring in the difficult title role as the willful, selfish and talented Sarah Bernhardt. Helen M. Strauss produced at Pinewood Studios this handsome and stylish Reader's Digest project which in its mounting evokes the best of David O. Selznick-George Cukor period films. Richard Fleischer's direction is effective. ... This is the story of a theatrical personality, not your average housewife. The achievement here is that Jackson makes the character comprehensible and, in a qualified way, admirable, notwithstanding the clear evidence of a totally selfcentered nature. One respects Bernhardt even though not especially wanting her in the immediate family, yet that's the point – a famous actress is not like other women."

== Awards ==
The film was nominated for two Academy Awards for Best Costume Design (Anthony Mendleson) and Best Art Direction (Elliot Scott and Norman Reynolds) at the 49th Academy Awards. Glenda Jackson was also nominated for a Golden Globe Award for Best Actress in a Drama at the 34th Golden Globe Awards.
