= 24-Hour Call =

1963 British TV drama series

- Written by: Lewis Greifer; Wilfred Greatorex; N. J. Crisp; Tudor Gates
- Starring: Geoffrey Frederick; Godfrey Quigley; Andrew Downie; Scott Forbes
- Country of origin: United Kingdom
- Original language: English
- No. of series: 1
- No. of episodes: 21

Production
- Producers: Hugh Rennie; Philip Dale
- Production company: ATV

Original release
- Release: 2 February – 23 June 1963

24-Hour Call is a 1963 British television series for ATV around the private practice of four doctors played by Godfrey Quigley as Dr Bennett and Geoffrey Frederick from a previous ATV series Call Oxbridge 2000, and newcomers Scott Forbes and Andrew Downie.

== Cast ==
- Geoffrey Frederick as Dr. Hamilton
- Godfrey Quigley as Dr. Bennett
- Andrew Downie as Dr. Murray
- Scott Forbes as Dr. Curtis
- Aileen Britton as Mrs. Bennett
- Jennifer Kennedy as Alison Graham
- Jessie Evans as Miss Davies
- Pauline Stroud as Receptionist
- Anne Godfrey as Receptionist/Nurse Benthall
- Richard Vernon as Wing Commander J. Battenby
- Marius Goring as Sam Bullivant
- Glyn Owen as Mel Harwood
- Dudley Foster as George Manning
- Jane Asher as Caroline Bullivant
- Jane Merrow as Moira Singleton
- Angus Lennie as Jock
- Melissa Stribling as Jackie Harwood
- Noel Johnson as Leonard Rowley
