= Night of the Prowler =

1962 British film by Francis Searle

- Directed by: Francis Searle
- Written by: Paul Erickson
- Produced by: Ronald Liles; John I. Phillips; Francis Searle
- Starring: Patrick Holt; Colette Wilde; John Horsley
- Cinematography: Walter J. Harvey
- Edited by: Jim Connock
- Music by: Johnny Gregory
- Production company: Butcher's Film Service
- Distributed by: Butcher's Film Distributors
- Release date: 18 August 1962
- Running time: 60 minutes
- Country: United Kingdom
- Language: English

Night of the Prowler is a 1962 British crime 'B' film directed by Francis Searle and starring Patrick Holt, Colette Wilde and John Horsley. It was written by Paul Erickson.

== Plot ==
The head of a racing car company is murdered. Suspicion falls on a disgruntled ex-employee, but when he is found dead, the real murderer is revealed.

== Cast ==
- Patrick Holt as Robert Langton
- Colette Wilde as Marie Langton
- Bill Nagy as Paul Conrad
- John Horsley as Detective Inspector Cameron
- Benny Lee as Benny
- Marianne Stone as Mrs. Cross
- Mark Singleton as Anders
- John Dunbar as Davies
- Robin Wentworth as Watts
- Tony Wager as Detective Sergeant Baker
- Jo Rowbottom as Elsie
- Mitzi Rogers as Jacky Reed

== Production ==
The film was shot at Shepperton Studios, with sets designed by the art director George Provis.

== Critical reception ==
The Monthly Film Bulletin said "As straightforward in presentation as it is in plot, this is a modest and rather unimaginative murder mystery, which yet manages to hold the attention, even if the solution is not likely to surprise armchair detectives. It is an agreeable, rather than an exciting second feature."

Kine Weekly wrote: "The picture, high-pressure 'whodunnit,' keeps the killer shrouded in mystery until just before the curtain drops. Patrick Holt disarms as the homicidal Robert, Colette Wilde has style as Marie, and Bill Nagy does his stuff as Paul. The office, apartment and swankey restaurant scenes impress, and there is quite a thrill on a motor race track. As for the nick-of-time finale, it's skilfully sprung. There are, in fact, few flies on The Prowler though he comes to a sticky and timely end."

The Radio Times Guide to Films gave the film 1/5 stars, writing: "British director Francis Searle had the distinction of making only one bill-topping feature in his entire 27-film career, the daft comedy A Girl in a Million. The remainder of his output consisted of B-movies, including this offering. Devotees of laughably bad low-budget crime movies should enjoy this tawdry tale of ambition, murder and deceit, set in the cut-throat world of the motor trade!"
