= The Autumn Ghosts =

1973 children's book by Ruth M. Arthur

- First edition
- Author: Ruth M. Arthur
- Original title: The Autumn People
- Illustrator: Margery Gill
- Cover artist: Margery Gill
- Language: English
- Genre: Young Adult Fiction
- Publisher: Atheneum Books
- Publication date: 1976
- Publication place: United States
- Media type: Print (hardcover)
- Pages: 186
- ISBN: 0426111648

The Autumn Ghosts is a 1973 children's book originally titled The Autumn People, re-printed 1976 with this title. It was written by Ruth M. Arthur, illustrated by Margery Gill and published by Atheneum Books. The book - set in the Scottish Islands, north of Scotland - explores good and evil in a small community.

== Summary ==
During a visit to the Scottish Islands, Romilly time slips into Millie's life and is entranced by the Autumn Ghosts and the power of the past. She discovers the truth about why her great-grandmother refused to return and how Rodger - one of her cousins - died. She helps exorcise the evil that was binding her family.

== Plot ==
Entry

Romilly Williams youth in Pembrokeshire, Wales is happy, she is close to her Gran and her family's housekeeper, Jeanie, who shares with Romilly a belief in ancient truths. Her Gran tells her stories of past family gatherings as Karasay House in the Scottish Islands, and the mystery around Millie, Gran's mother, who visited once, refused to ever return and would never tell why.

Part I

Millie, sixteen year-old, goes to Karasay to stay with family friends as she is coming of age in 1901. Everyone is gracious and welcoming, but Rodger became a focal point as he is clearly fascinated by her. She has always felt more complicated emotionally than others and he seems to sense that. She and Jocelyn are attracted to each other, and Rodger starts harassing Millie. His malevolence becomes clear, and Millie tries to avoid him. Finally Rodger says to Millie that she must stop her involvement with Jocelyn, otherwise he will be harmed. Millie accidentally stumbles upon Rodger’s chamber of horrors – an old mine shaft he had converted into a place full of animal skins, twisted skeletons, small human figures made of clay, and other implements of evil. He tells Millie he had intended to marry her in time and initiate her into his way of life then, but since she had discovered him, it would have to be done now. He sliced both their wrists, made her promise to keep what she had found secret under pain of harm to Jocelyn, pushed their wrists together to pool their blood, and sealed the vow. He took an ancient stone ring from a string around his neck and forced it on her finger, ordering her not to remove it. On returning to her room, she takes off the ring and hides it in her room.

Jocelyn proposes to Millie, but she puts him off because of Rodger's threats. The next day she hears Rodger and Jocelyn arguing, she tells them to stop and tells Rodger that if he harms Jocelyn, she'll kill him. Jocelyn and Millie plan to wait until they've left the island to complete their engagement, when they're safe from Rodger. During a violent storm Rodger disappears - never to be seen alive again. Millie believes he came to harm in his hideaway, and keeps her promise to him of secrecy, knowing her silence could cause his death. She hopes it does. Jocelyn questions her, begs her to reassure him openly the she doesn't know anything about Rodger's death. They parted on uneasy terms, and a few weeks later Millie felt compelled to write to Jocelyn and break it off with him, for his own safety. Millie married James instead, they had a daughter they named Alison. But Millie never felt completely free of Rodger’s evil.

Part II

Romilly heard everything good about Karasay, and then the mysterious aspects as far as Millie’s behavior, which no one had every been able to explain. She went there with Gran, and got to know Cousin Derwant, and fell in love with it herself. Since she and Gran had spent so much time with the stories of Millie’s generation and the photos and all, she was able to easily imagine everyone being there when she was. In fact, she experienced actual time slips back to Millie’s time, on purpose, consciously, awake. It was only possible at certain periods of time – when the ghosts themselves were available, at the time they always were available, in Autumn. And it was only possible because she was Millie’s descendant, and because she wanted to be with them so much.

With all of that intensity of feeling, it also happened that Rodger’s ghost claimed her as well. With him it was the opposite sensations – icy cold physical energy, fear, terror and revulsion. Romilly found the ring and put it on, and then she could not take it off. And once that happened, he appeared to her more frequently and more substantially. Finally she discovered the horror of his evil den. Miss Millie discovered it through her and set it all of fire, exorcising the evil spirits.

After that, the ring easily came off her finger, and she was distinctly aware that Rodger’s ghost was removed from Karasay House. She managed to surreptitiously place the ring in a historic museum collection without anyone aware, believing that in the locked-in location, its power was absent.

Exit

During Romilly's first term at art school, she meets Joss and they begin to dance.

== Major characters ==
Romilly Williams – protagonist, sixteen years old,

Alison Graham is Romilly’s maternal grandmother – Gran - who lived in London with her husband, Granda. She had grown up in Edinburgh, and used to visit the Karasay House with her cousins every year. She plays piano.

Romilly Graham (nee Romilly Carpentier), AKA Millie – narrator of Part I - is Gran’s mother, who Romilly is named after. She went by Millie. Even in her youth, she was moody at times, and prone to unhappiness. She constantly tried to be ‘the happy person I could be’. She hated the Karasay House after a tragedy happened there when she was young. She never went back. She died when Gran was ten years old. She had been reserved, even secretive, moody, and hard for Gran to be with.

Rodger Graham is Charlotte’s middle brother, eighteen years old. A practitioner of black magic, his face was "lean and secretive, shadowed and knowing – an old-young face". His animal-torture and evil ritual practices were hidden by an interest in animal photography that kept him away from most family gatherings. Everyone walked on eggshells around him, because of his violent temper and his mysterious ability to ‘punish’ people in unusual ways. He chose Millie to be his wife, and threatened Jocelyn's life if she disobeyed or told anyone about his true nature and his evil lair.

James Graham – Charlotte’s older brother closest to her age, also open and positive, seventeen years old in Part I. He was very fond of Millie, but he knew that Jocelyn was her main interest.

Jocelyn Parsons is eighteen, also finished school (male), is the one and only love of Millie's life.

Miss Minnie a neighbor of The Karasay House, whose sister is a current-time cohort of Rodgers. She exorcises Rodger's evil remnants with fire, breaking the spell over Mille and Romilly

'Joss Parsons descendant of Jocelyn Parsons, who meets Romilly after Rodger's spell is broken

The Autumn People/ The Autumn Ghosts the Parson family of Millie's time, who return to their home on Karasay Island every year in the Autumn for a week or two

== Reception ==
The Desert Sun noted Ruth Arthur as one of the best in the specialized field of Young Adult supernatural fiction, possibly due to being born in Scotland, stating that her talent is in being able to capture "the world just beyond touch." The Desert Sun compared it to her earlier Requiem for a Princess, saying that it "shows the magnetism of the past". Charlotte's Library Blog recommended it for how it tied the past to the present, while indicating that the characterization of Rodger and Jocelyn were without nuance. Read-at-Home Mom blog stated, "Dealing with the effect of the past on the present, this story is haunting but with a happy ending".
