= Requiem for a Princess =

- First edition
- Author: Ruth M. Arthur
- Illustrator: Margery Gill
- Cover artist: Margery Gill
- Language: English
- Genre: Young Adult Fiction
- Publisher: Atheneum Books
- Publication date: 1967
- Publication place: United States
- Media type: Print (hardcover)
- Pages: 182
- ISBN: 0689704194
- Preceded by: A Candle in Her Room
- Followed by: Portrait of Margarita

Requiem for a Princess is a 1967 children's book written by Ruth M. Arthur, illustrated by Margery Gill and published by Atheneum Books. The book - set in Cornwall, England - explores the issue of adoption against the historical backdrop of the Anglo-Spanish War (1585–1604).

== Summary ==
An English girl's path towards becoming a concert pianist is blocked when she discovers she has been adopted. Overwhelmed with that information, she questions her identity and everything familiar about her life. She becomes ill and is brought to stay with family friends on the Cornish coast. Through time slips into the life of a young princess, in the period 1589 - 1602, she gains a new perspective on her own life. That new perspective helps her resolve her confusions and regain a positive perspective.

== Plot ==
Willow Penelope Forrester is the only child of a sheep farming family, who discovers a talent for piano playing as she matures. Her music teacher finds a program in Germany that would be a perfect fit. Miss Carpenter gives her a new piece of music to start to learn - Ravel's Pavane for a Dead Infanta but her fingers were clumsy with chilblains. The tune is rooted in her mind though. Just as she is starting to deal with her parents antipathy towards music as a career path for her, she comes down with the flu at school. As she and another girl one day have a long-running spat, the other girl hurls at her the fact that she is adopted. Willow's illness takes longer to heal from as she is thrown into confusion and depression.

To facilitate her recovery, her mother brings her to a private hotel called Penliss in Cornwall by the sea. The oldest part of Penliss (the kitchen and two rooms above) date back to the Elizabethan Era, the rest of the building at that time burned. In its place is a newer building, added on to the original part. Willow discovers the Velasquez portrait of Isabel, finely dressed wearing a unique pendant necklace, in the room with the piano. She plays Pavane and tells the portrait - "that was for you -Isabel." When she asks Rosamund about Isabel, she explains that Isabel was brought from Spain and adopted by the Tresilian family, but died young. This only whets Willow's curiosity, and she becomes obsessed with learning more. Willow finds Isabel's memorial stone in the family chapel, which states that Isabel died of "supposed drowning" at age 17, in 1602.

Outside one day, she discovers a sunken area in the garden, and learns from Rosamund and Amelie that it was called the 'Spanish' Garden. She feels it has a connection to Isabel. She is allowed to clean it up and look after it, and buried within it she discovers the exact pendant Isabel is wearing in the portrait. She keeps it a secret, especially from Amelie: whose intensity makes her uncomfortable. She's happy to be in Amelie's good graces though, after restoring Isabel's garden. Amelie gives her a posset as she is going to sleep and tells her to ""sleep happily," and that night she has her first vivid dream as 4-year-old Isabel living happily in her family's castle in Spain. Her second dream as Isabel takes place 4 years later in her time, and she is restrained and captive, on a boat leaving shore, her family's castle in flames. Some time passes, and there is a pitched battle on deck. She goes up to find out what has happened, and there are Englishmen on the boat. The landed near Penliss, and that became her home. In Willows third dream of Isabel, less than a year has passed since she arrived at Penliss. Uncle Cornelius does all her can to help her adjust to her new home, including having a 'Spanish' Garden put in, with a fountain. But she's in deep grief at the loss of her family, her home and her country, and many of the people around Penliss are mean to her as she is Spanish. She is determined to return to Spain some day.

As the dreams continue, Willow almost feels like she is living Isabel's life with her: enjoying the sea and visiting Uncle Cornelius' tin mines, where she meets Richard. Back in the present day, Willow continues to try to reconstruct her relationship with her parents, comparing the gratitude she 'owes' her parents to the situation of Isabel and Cornelius. Rosamund takes her to visit Land's End, and continues to be supportive and warm towards her. Willow learns that Cornelius died accidentally, right at a time when tensions were rising between England and Spain again - suddenly Isabel's life was in danger. She and Richard tried to escape via ship, but a violent storm prevented their safe passage. During Willow's last week with Rosamund, the two of them and Caspar go to visit the Scilly Isles, where Willow finally learns the rest of Isabel's story, and is able to carry out her final wishes. Then Willow returns home with her parents, renewed with a positive perspective on her place in her family.

== Characters ==
- Willow Penelope Forrester - protagonist and narrator
- Willow's Father, sheep farmer who had been in the navy
- Willow's Mother, kind, prone to migraines
- Miss Carpenter, Willow's piano teacher
- Rosamund Tresilian - owner of Penliss in Cornwall
- Amelie - housekeeper of Penliss (from Brittany)
- Jake - Amelie's grandson, handyman for Penliss
- Isabel de Calverados, Spanish woman whose portrait hangs at Penliss
- Anthony Tresilian, sailor who rescued Isabel from the Pirate ship
- Cornelius Tresilian, Esquire, Anthony's father, who adopted Isabel
- Celestine - Isabel's nurse who raises her (from Brittany)
- Richard Redhead - Tin mine worker who courts Isabel
- Caspar Tresilian - Rosamund's young cousin from Australia

== Time slip ==
Willow's journey at Penliss includes dreams of Isabel, in which Willow goes through a time slip back to 16th-century Spain. Experiencing things from Isabel's eyes - her fate similar to but instructively more severe than being adopted - she is able to see her own situation with greater perspective.

== Awards ==
Requiem for a Princess was included as a Library of Congress Children's Literature Center Book, in the category of 'Stories for Older Boys and Girls', 1967.

== Reception ==
Through learning about Isabel's life, Willow is able to come to terms with her own. Sandra Taubel states, Requiem for a Princess was a Junior Literary Guild selection, and makes for good reading for adolescents." The primary criticism from Charlotte's Library is a lack of immediacy, "there's a distance to the whole tone, with emotions told and not shown." Sarah Debraski read and re-read it as a child, and remembered her fondness for it years later. Re-reading it as an adult, she felt that the dated elements were easy to overlook, while the main story of Willow's life "becoming intertwined with that of the girl from hundreds of years ago was still compelling." Windsor Star librarian Frances Curry describes Willow's summer as an 'exciting and sometimes eerie adventure.'
