= On the Wasteland =

1975 book by Ruth M. Arthur

- First edition (UK)
- Author: Ruth M. Arthur
- Illustrator: Margery Gill
- Cover artist: Margery Gill
- Language: English
- Genre: Young Adult Fiction
- Publisher: Victor Gollancz (UK); Atheneum Books (USA)
- Publication date: 1975
- Publication place: United Kingdom
- Media type: Print (hardcover)
- Pages: 159
- ISBN: 0-689-30473-0
- OCLC: 1994413

On the Wasteland is a 1975 children's book written by Scottish author Ruth M. Arthur, illustrated by Margery Gill and published by Victor Gollancz in the United Kingdom and Atheneum Books in the United States. The book - set in Suffolk, England - explores the relationship between the past and the present in the life of a teenage woman.

== Summary ==
Betony is orphaned at age six, when her mother's boyfriend travels with her from the Scottish borderland to Suffolk, where her mother's family originated. From that age she grows up in a children's home, while exploring the area where her ancestors may have lived. As her time slip experiences become more and more substantial to her, she finds the family experiences she longed for, but nearly loses herself in the process. With support from her guardian and her friends, she ties together all the strands - past and present - and moves forward to start the next chapter of her life.

== Plot ==
When Betony first arrives at Brackenbury Children's Home, the other children sense her independent ways and see the rings in her ears, and assign her the name of 'Gypsy.' Not used to being around kids her own age, and feeling very vulnerable after so much loss, she establishes a loner self among her classmates. On her own she explores the 'Wasteland', nearby salt marshes fed by the North Sea. In her internal world she is open and listening, and one day while she's digging around she digs much deeper than usual as if possessed, and discovers an immovable object made of wood. Her shovel breaks off a part of that object, which she carries with her from that point on.

Carrying the wooden splint with her, she first begins to see the Viking ship itself, back when the North Sea came farther inland as a wide river and the pool was an actual port. She slips into the experience of being lashed to the deck for safety as a child when her Danish Viking raider family came over to East Anglia. The ship and its inhabitants become her internal fascination, and she wills herself to go deeper into the feeling of those lives. She finds books on the area's history and sees ships just like that of her vision, during the period when the Vikings raiders became traders and neighbours to the Saxon residents.

One day as she holds the wooden splint in her hand, she feels reality around her transform with sound vibration. She can hear the bustle of a busy camp momentarily, and then it fades away. From that point she continues to seek out and have intensifying experiences first with sound only including battle scenes with cries of 'The Norsemen' from the inland Saxon communities. As the time slip experiences continue she not only can see what is happening, but she experiences events physically, and can also understand their foreign language perfectly. She slips in to the life of Estrith, her ancestor, as she is betrothed to Edmund in the name of peace between the peoples.

Simultaneous with those intense time slip experiences, Betony gets to know the people living nearby. She befriends Yetty and Nott, who live in a boathouse and is beside herself when their home is set on fire while Nott is away ill (and Yetty with him). She goes to Yetty's employer, Carrie Thorpe, to inquire about seeing Yetty, and they become acquainted. When Yetty moves to the manor to stay on and help Mrs. Thorpe, Betony becomes a frequent visitor (and later, employee). She succeeds in her studies and meets Lionel.

After witnessing a life-changing event for Estrith, Betony feels compelled to rush into the flowing river and nearly drowns back in the present time. She is pulled out by Orlando, speaking at first in a language she can't understand until she returns to the present day. She closes the door to the past by throwing that piece of wood in the fire, and turns instead to her actual present-day life. When Linney returns home next, they move towards a serious relationship. Linney has invited an archaeologist to the area, and they try and find the buried ship, but are not able to - nor anything else from those early settlements. Despite the disappointment, Betony decides to study history, specialise in the Saxon-Viking period, and to make teaching about that period her life's work.

== Major characters ==
Betony Craig, protagonist, orphan, descendant of Vikings who settled around Suffolk.

Sally Craig, Betony's mother, who tried to care for Betony after her husband died, but died in childbirth herself when Betony was six.

Betony's Maternal great-grandfather, direct descendant of the Viking settlers. Had an old family ring, gave it to Sally for her wedding ceremony. Toward the end of her life, Sally had that ring crafted into two earrings for Betony.

Sparks, Betony's dog, who is allowed to stay with her at Brackenbury against protocol, providing companionship in her early years there. After Sparks dies, he continues to protect Betony when called upon.

Yvette (Yetty) Nott, part-time housekeeper for Mrs. Thorpe at the manor house. Elderly, she becomes very dear to Bett (as she calls Betony). Growing up in the village, she had lived in an upturned boat on the far side of the tide pool with her husband for 30 years as of the time of the story.

Adam Nott (Nott), Yetty's husband, is an ex-Navy man wounded during the war, currently makes a modest living as a water diviner. He speaks the Suffolk dialect more heavily than Yetty. After a fall in which he breaks his leg and catches pneumonia from exposure, he has a long convalescence but dies without returning to their home.

Orlando Frisby (Orrie), an adopted young black man whose father is a mussel fisherman, a bit older than Betony. After the other boys burn down the boat house, he focuses on Yetty and takes up gardening at the manor.

Lionel Thorpe (Linney), favorite grandson of Carrie Thorpe, around Betony's age, who also feels drawn to the Wasteland.

Estrith, the chieftain's daughter, whose life Betony time slips in to.

Thorkell, Estrith's brother and leader of their Viking community in Suffolk, who seeks peace with their Saxon neighbours.

== Minor characters ==
- Betony's father, Scottish fisherman who died when Betony was just a baby, in an accident at sea.
- Betony's mother's grandmother, raised Betony's mother with her husband at the edge of the salt marshes.
- Jacko, Betony's mother's boyfriend at the end, a tinker and metalworker. Preferred to keep the three of them separate from the Tinker communities, brought Betony back to Suffolk after her mother died.
- Miss Lib, a young woman who teaches at Brackenbury and first found Betony and brought her there. She moved away soon after.
- Miss John, headmistress of Brackenbury, strict but gentle. She always acted with Betony's best interests in mind.
- Carrie Thorpe, widow of George Thorpe of the local landed family, living in the manor house. Yetty's employer who adds Betony to help Yetty, and lends Betony books from her library. The Wasteland actually belongs to the Thorpe family.
- Selina, Orlando's girl friend.
- Red Cole and Bob Cole, sons of mussel fishers recently moved in to the area, with much bravado and not enough restraint.
- Emma, Thorkell's betrothed, daughter of a Saxon chieftain.
- Chieftain's mother, raises Estrith and Thorkell and longs to see home again before she dies. She weaves cloth on a small loom, and uses runes and amulets to ward off the evil eye.
- Edmund, Estrith's betrothed, son of a Saxon chieftain.
- Viking chieftain, leader of the incoming community and head of the household Betony joins.

== Time slip ==
Betony's childhood at Brackenbury includes increasingly vivid experiences from the perspective of her Viking ancestor via a time slip back to the period around 850 AD to 975 AD, when the Wasteland was water-accessible from the North Sea and the Viking settlements were taking hold. Within that past life she is deeply rooted in family, and becomes betrothed to an important chief. After the loss of her family at sea, Betony closes the door to those experiences.

== Wasteland ==
The intensely untamed land that Arthur describes as the Wasteland is a major aspect of the book, continuing a pattern throughout her work that places importance on places. Vivid descriptions of its vegetation, changeable weather and soaring birds create a setting that is wild both literally and figuratively. Arthur cites the Shorter Oxford Dictionary definition of 'wasteland' in the front pages: "Land in its natural uncultivated state". This space is filled with intense emotional attachment for Betony. Yetty and Nott - an elderly couple who live in an upturned boat - become supports during her journey, in which the Wasteland both "enchants and ensnares" her. Yetty warns Bett that the Wasteland's pool was best avoided, that there was a ghost pirate ship haunting the place. The ship seemed to carry echoes of its own dangerous times, casting a spell over people and actually causing several drownings despite the low water levels. After it almost happens to her, Betony comes to grips with the place's full measure, her bond to it remaining unbroken even so.

== Reception ==
Library Thing describes On the Wasteland as an interesting variation on Arthur's usual time slip novel. Instead of the past helping the protagonist solve her present day problems, there is a neat symmetry: "the echoes of the past saving Betony from her early isolation and her growing friendships saving her from the past." Charlotte's Library Blog enjoyed On the Wasteland but regretted the narrative distance caused by Betony telling the reader what happened, and the frequent use of flashbacks.
