= Miss MacTaggart Won't Lie Down =

1966 British film by Francis Searle

- Still from film
- Directed by: Francis Searle
- Screenplay by: Elwyn Ambrose
- Produced by: Francis Searle
- Starring: Barbara Mullen
- Cinematography: Terry Maher
- Music by: Peter Jeffries
- Production company: Chairene Productions
- Release date: 1966
- Running time: 28 minutes
- Country: United Kingdom
- Language: English

Miss MacTaggart Won't Lie Down is a 1966 British short comedy film directed by Francis Searle and starring Barbara Mullen. It was written by Elwyn Ambrose.

Miss MacTaggart Won't Lie Down is the first in a series of 30-minute films directed by Searle in the "Screen Miniatures" series, which he made between 1966 and 1972. Others in the series are The Pale Faced Girl (1968), Talk of the Devil (1968), Gold Is Where You Find It (1968), It All Goes to Show (1969), A Hole Lot of Trouble (1971) and A Couple of Beauties (1972).

== Plot ==
Miss MacTaggart returns to her home village of Drumlochie after taking a trip to Glasgow. The locals are very surprised to see her, because they recently buried her. Miss MacTaggart explains that it must have been her twin sister. But Miss MacTaggart is now "deceased" and in Scottish law a death certificate cannot be revoked. She goes on a one-person crimewave in the hope that her arrest and prosecution might require the authorities to declare her alive again.

== Cast ==
- Barbara Mullen as Miss MacTaggart
- Eric Woodburn as Morrison
- Andrew Downie as Sgt. Macleod
- Jack Lambert as Lord Longbrae
- Tim Barrett as manservant
- Patrick Jordan as reporter
- Frank Sieman as policeman
- Katharine Page as postmistress
- Laurie Leigh as mother
- Pat Mason as Mrs Murray
- Joe Ritchie as news vendor

== Critical reception ==
Monthly Film Bulletin said, "This 'Screen Miniature' seems designed solely as a vehicle for Barbara Mullen, but even admirers of her blend of practical wisdom and sly, folksy, humour may find it all laid on a little thickly. Not content with stealing a royal tiara, playing the bagpipes under a local dignitary's window in the middle of the night, and leaving a haggis disguised as a bomb in the House of Commons, Miss MacTaggart even troubles the Prime Minister ('How's the family?') with her problem. In the end she leaves happy, mouthing the word 'ombudsman', which, she is informed, is a Norwegian word meaning a panacea for all bureaucratic ills. There must be better ways of making the point."
