= A Hole Lot of Trouble =

1971 British film by Francis Searle

- Opening titles
- Directed by: Francis Searle
- Written by: Ian Flintoff
- Story by: Francis Searle
- Produced by: Francis Searle; Robert Gallico; John Hogarth
- Starring: Arthur Lowe; Tim Barrett; Victor Maddern; Bill Maynard
- Cinematography: Terry Maher
- Edited by: Peter Mayhew
- Music by: Peter Jeffries
- Production company: Chairene Productions
- Distributed by: Monarch Film Corporation (UK)
- Release date: 31 January 1971 (UK)
- Running time: 27 minutes
- Country: United Kingdom
- Language: English

A Hole Lot of Trouble is a 1971 British short comedy film directed by Francis Searle and starring Arthur Lowe, Victor Maddern and Bill Maynard. It was written by Ian Flintoff. It charts the efforts of a group of workmen trying to dig a hole.

A Hole Lot of Trouble is one of a series of 30-minute films directed by Searle in the "Screen Miniatures" series, which he made between 1966 and 1972. Others in the series are Miss MacTaggart Won’t Lie Down (1966), The Pale Faced Girl (1968), Talk of the Devil (1968), Gold Is Where You Find It (1968), It All Goes to Show (1969) and A Couple of Beauties (1972).

== Cast ==
- Arthur Lowe as Mr. Whitehouse
- Victor Maddern as Percy
- Tim Barrett as Longbottom
- Bill Maynard as Bill
- Ken Parry as Charles
- Leslie Dwyer as evangelist
- Benny Lee as Bert
- Brian Weske as Digby
- Neal Arden as military-type man
- Jack Chissick
- Michael Sharvell-Martin as newly-wed husband
- Geraldine Gardner as newly-wed wife (as Trudi van Doorn)
- Georgina Simpson as Carol
- Hani Borelle as Fenella
- Hazel Coppen as Alice

== Home media ==
It was released on DVD in the UK in 2015.
