= Ruth M. Arthur =

Scottish writer and teacher

Ruth Mabel Arthur Huggins
- Born: Ruth Mabel Arthur; 26 May 1905
- Died: 6 March 1979 (aged 73)
- Education: Froebel Training College
- Occupations: writer; teacher
- Spouse: Frederick Newey Huggins (m. 1932)
- Children: 6
- Writing career
- Pen name: Ruth M. Arthur
- Period: 1932–1979
- Genres: Young-adult; mystery fiction; supernatural fiction; children's; Gothic romance

Ruth Mabel Arthur Huggins, sometimes misspelt as Higgins (26 May 1905 – 6 March 1979) was a Scottish teacher and writer whose books were published under her maiden name as Ruth M. Arthur. She mainly wrote for children and young adults in English. Her best-known books were those written for teenage girls, that contained elements of suspense and the supernatural and were anchored in historical settings.

== Early life ==
Ruth Mabel Arthur was born to Allan Arthur and Ruth M. Johnston on 26 May 1905 in Lanark, Glasgow, Scotland. She spent her childhood in the countryside outside of Glasgow, attending St. Columba's School in Kilmacolm, Renfrewshire.

== Adulthood ==
Once she turned 18, she enrolled in Froebel Training College in Roehampton, London. While studying at Froebel, she had several short stories published. Three years later, in 1926, she graduated as a certified kindergarten teacher. After graduation, she moved back to Glasgow, where she taught kindergarten at Laurel Bank School for three years. In 1930, she moved to Loughton, Essex, England, where she taught at a local secondary school until 1932.

In 1932, Arthur got engaged to the solicitor Frederick Newey Huggins, son of George and Jane Daisy Huggins of The Rowans, Four Oaks, Birmingham. They married on 2 September 1932.

== Literary career ==
=== Early works ===
Arthur's first book Friendly Stories, etc., was published by George G. Harrap and Co. in the year of her marriage, 1932. The stories feature small animals that have lives similar to people, and children (and adults) themselves. One story includes a tree gnome, and frost elves and snow elves; another story is about how Spring lets people know she is coming by putting furry grey coats on one plant – the pussy willow. The interactions between animals and people are understood differently by each group. This set of stories was reprinted in 1935, 1938, 1941, 1942 and 1949.

Over the next 15 years, Arthur published six books suitable for preschool children, making them age-appropriate for the six Arthur children during their preschool years. In 1957, Arthur started to write books for 7-8 year olds, and her intended audience changed when her youngest child outgrew that age group: "I followed my youngest daughter as she grew up. When she grew out of the children's book stage, so did I."

Pumpkin Pie, first published in 1938 and then again in 1941, is a collection for very young children from their point of view. There are cute little animals and children and miniature challenges and outcomes. The stories also include a gnome named Stumps who does magic, a girl in Belgium with magic clogs that have a mind of their own, and a mermaid. The 1938 printing was by Collins in Glasgow, as part of their Silver Torch Series and the 1941 printing by Collins in London was part of their series called The Little Ones First Library.

Arthur next wrote a three-part series about Brownies. The Crooked Brownie was published in 1936 by Whitcombe & Tombs, an educational publishing house based in New Zealand. With a printing office in London as well, they produced popular educational series including 'Whitcombe's Story Books.' Between 1908 and 1962 they printed 666 titles in that series, the most extensive collection of children's books. The Crooked Brownie in Town and The Crooked Brownie at the Seaside were published in London in 1942 by George G. Harrap and Co. and printed by Jarrold & Sons Ltd of Norwich. Those later Brownie books included characters that were small, cuddly animals, as well as a gnome, a pixie, and an elf.

=== Interim period ===
In the late 1950s and early 1960s, Miller continued writing sets of related short stories. These stories were for an older audience then the Brownie and Friendly stories. Titles in this Carolina and Roberto series include: Carolina's holiday, and other stories, Carolina's Golden Bird and other stories, Carolina and Roberto, and Carolina and the Sea-horse, and other stories, as well as two others: The Daisy Cow, and other stories of the Channel Islands and A Cottage for Rosemary. She also had a short story called A Crown for Caroline included in a 1964 book titled A Book of Girls Stories printed by Golden Pleasure Books, Ltd. of London.

=== Young adult fiction ===
Starting with Dragon Summer in 1962, Arthur switched to writing novels for young adults. These books, which occupied the intersection between fantasy and gothic romance, were her most popular works. They often included wartime historical backdrops, time slips, and haunted objects.

"Well-constructed and readable.. they provide a useful stepping-stone to the adult fiction of Daphne de Maurier, Mary Stewart and other writers of this kind."

In addition to Dragon Summer, Arthur's other time-slip titles include A Candle in Her Room, Requiem for a Princess, and On the Wasteland. Her ghost stories include Dragon Summer, The Autumn People/The Autumn Ghosts, and Miss Ghost. The Saracen Lamp revolves around an old object, as does A Candle in Her Room and Requiem for a Princess. The Little Dark Thorn has much less of a supernatural feel to it, but there is an old object in it that carries essential meaning for the protagonist.

After Candlemas/Candlemas mystery is another of her romantic-gothic novels for teenage girls, along with Dragon Summer and Portrait of Margarita. After Candlemas refers to the ancient holiday of Candlemas, a significant calendar aspect in ancient Scotland which shares some features with the Gaelic festival Imbolc, and became known as Groundhog Day in North America. In An Old Magic, an ancient charm exerts power over one of the characters. Her other books for young adults include The Whistling Boy and My daughter, Nicola.

In Miss Ghost, Arthur's final novel, the protagonist Elphie has to overcome isolation brought on by distance in her immediate family. She also speaks with a stutter when she is struggling, which adds a layer of discomfort. At her new boarding school she is provided support and is able to move forward.

== Style ==
In her most popular books, the ones for young adults, Arthur tended to use the first-person narrative a great deal, relaying events from the viewpoint of the focal character or protagonist as they interact with the world around them. For example, in The Whistling Boy, "[t]he nature and feeling of the characters are explained rather than revealed." A Candle in Her Room has three generations of girls and women in the same family as narrators.

The settings of her books for young adults often have historical backgrounds and are places that Arthur was intimately familiar with. For example, The Saracen Lamp was set in an old house that she was familiar with in the Cotswolds.

Many of her stories for young adults shared similar themes and intertwined history, time, and old objects.

"Ruth Arthur makes constant use of old objects. The list of Arthur's books includes The Saracen Lamp, Requiem for a Princess, using an old carving, and A Candle for her Room using an old doll."

Arthur spends a lot of time on researching historical subjects, usually spending about a year on the first draft. The two main types of books in this series are the timeslip books, which "typically feature a teenage girl on the verge of adolescence, a crisis dramatically resolved through her absorption in an earlier, exemplary life-situation;" and her ghost stories, "in which the process is reversed: Ghosts visit girls in trouble and offer solutions".

Rose Michael notes, "..it was Ruth M Arthur’s tales that affected me the most. Her stories, where a preteen girl trips into another (historic) world where a character is experiencing a similar but more extreme situation, are so convincing that I couldn’t sleep with them in my room."

== Awards ==
Requiem for a Princess was included as a Library of Congress Children's Literature Center Book, in the category of 'Stories for Older Boys and Girls', 1967. It is the story of a young girl named Willow who discovers she is adopted, and how she comes to terms with her situation via dreams involving an earlier inhabitant of her home, named Isabel.

== Works ==
- 1932 – Friendly Stories, etc., illustrated by G. Fyffe Christie
- 1936 – The Crooked Brownie, illus. R. M. Turvey
- 1938 – Pumpkin Pie
- 1938 – Mother Goose Stories, etc., illus. Ruth Newton and Irene Mountfort
- 1942 – The Crooked Brownie in Town, illus. R. M. Turvey
- 1942 – The Crooked Brownie at the Seaside, illus. R. M. Turvey
- 1949 – Cowslip Mollie, illus. Helen Haywood
- 1957 – Carolina's holiday, and Other Stories, illus. Dodie Masterman
- 1958 – Carolina's Golden Bird and other stories, illus. Lucien Lowen
- 1958 – The Daisy Cow, and other stories of the Channel Islands
- 1960 – A Cottage for Rosemary, illus. M. Whittaker
- 1961 – Carolina and Roberto, illus. Lucien Lowen
- 1962 – Dragon Summer, illus. Margery Gill
- 1964 – Carolina and the Sea-horse, and other stories
- 1965 – My daughter, Nicola, illus. Fermin Rocker
- 1966 – A Candle in Her Room, (Note: Also available in Audiobook: English, spoken by Angela Cockburn.) illus. Gill
- 1967 – Requiem for a Princess, illus. Gill
- 1968 – Portrait of Margarita, (Note: Also available in Braille English.) illus. Gill
- 1969 – The Whistling Boy, (Note: Also available in Audiobook: English, spoken by Belinda Paxton.) illus. Gill
- 1970 – The Saracen Lamp, (Note: Also available in Audiobook: English, spoken by Pamela Waters.) illus. Gill
- 1971 – The Little Dark Thorn, (Note: Also available in Audiobook on Cassette : Cassette recording.) illus. Gill
- 1973 – The Autumn People, illus. Gill; reissued 1976 as The Autumn Ghosts
- 1974 – After Candlemas, illus. Gill; reissued 1976 as Candlemas Mystery
- 1975 – On the Wasteland, illus. Gill
- 1977 – An Old Magic, illus. Gill
- 1979 – Miss Ghost (Note: Also available in Braille English.)

Works published in the United States as of 1973 included Dragon Summer; My Daughter, Nicola; A Candle in Her Room, Requiem for a Princess, Portrait of Margarita, The Whistling Boy, The Saracen Lamp, and The Little Dark Thorn.

=== Translations ===
Arthur's books have been translated into German, Norwegian, Portuguese, Danish, and Japanese.

==== Danish ====
- 1979 – En fremmed (The Little Dark Thorn)

==== German ====
- 1973 – Wer bist du, Pietro? (Portrait of Margarita) Cover Illustrator Elisabeth Grauel- von Mandelsloh
- 1974 – Kleiner dunkler Dorn (The Little Dark Thorn)

==== Norwegian ====
- 1968 – Slik var Margarita (Portrait of Margarita)
- 1969 – Møte med Isabella (Requiem for a Princess)

==== Portuguese ====
- O Retrato de Margarida (Requiem for a Princess)

==== Japanese ====
- 1982 – Purinsesu e no chinkonka (プリンセスへの鎮魂歌) (Requiem for a Princess)
