= Freedom to Die =

1961 British film by Francis Searle

- Still from film
- Directed by: Francis Searle
- Screenplay by: Arthur La Bern
- Produced by: Charles A. Leeds
- Starring: Paul Maxwell; Felicity Young; Bruce Seton
- Cinematography: Ken Hodges
- Edited by: Jim Connock
- Music by: John Veale
- Production company: Ardmore Studios
- Distributed by: Butcher's Film Distributors
- Release date: 5 March 1961 (UK)
- Running time: 61 min
- Country: United Kingdom
- Language: English

Freedom to Die is a 1961 British second feature crime thriller film directed by Francis Searle, starring Paul Maxwell and Felicity Young. It was written by Arthur La Bern.

== Plot ==
Craig Owen is an incarcerated criminal whose cellmate Felix knows about a safety deposit box with valuable contents. When the cellmate dies, Owen escapes to get the stash. Unable to open the box, he forces Felix's adopted daughter, Linda, to give him the key. Owen is re-arrested and sent back to prison. When his release day comes, Linda shoots him dead.

== Cast ==
- Paul Maxwell as Craig Owen
- Felicity Young as Linda
- Bruce Seton as Felix
- Kay Callard as Coral
- T. P. McKenna as Mike
- Laurie Leigh as Julie

== Critical reception ==
The Monthly Film Bulletin said "Unexceptional crime-and-vengeance thriller, lumbered with unnecessary plot ramifications and pretensions toward deeper motivation that neither script nor cast are equipped to handle properly. The direction is rough-and-ready, but keeps the action ticking over steadily."

Chibnall and McFarlane in The British 'B' Film describe the film as: "an unusually sombre thriller with a grim ending."
