= The Saracen Lamp =

Children's book

- First edition
- Author: Ruth M. Arthur
- Illustrator: Margery Gill
- Cover artist: Margery Gill
- Language: English
- Genre: Young Adult Fiction
- Publisher: Atheneum Books
- Publication date: 1970
- Publication place: United States
- Media type: Print (hardcover)
- Pages: 210
- ISBN: 0575004126
- OCLC: 69305

The Saracen Lamp is a 1970 children's book written by Ruth M. Arthur, illustrated by Margery Gill and published by Atheneum Books. The book - set in Gloucestershire, England - explores the effect of a saracen lamp on multiple generations of young women, against a historical backdrop.

== Summary ==
The character of Yusef, a bondman/slave - saracen - captured by Melisande's father during the last Crusade in the Middle East - is central to A Saracen Lamp although he is a tragic figure who dies almost immediately after the book starts. He poured his love for Melisande into the lamp he makes for her as a wedding present, and that object has an effect on her and her family for hundreds of years.

The story is told in three parts, each by a separate narrator as the story moves through time.

Part one takes place between 1313 and 1350, and told by Melisande, whose grandfather fought in earlier crusades (Seventh Crusade, Eighth Crusade for King Louis, while her father fought in the Ninth Crusade and was injured; and ends with her sons fighting in the Hundred Years' War.

Part two is told by Alys, living in Littleperry in the sheep district of Gloucestershire as she comes of age. Unaware of her family background initially, she learns the truth and rebels against the established order by removing the saracen lamp from the household.

Part three is told by Perdita in the modern era, as she discovers the past and seeks to remedy what she can.

== Plot ==
A young woman, 16-year-old Melisande marries Sir Hugh de Hervey - 6 years older than her - with reluctance, as she does not know him and wishes to continue her carefree youth at home in Southern France. Her father - wounded in the last of King Louis' Crusades against the Saracens - is feeble and weak, but wishes her to go through with this union. Yusef - who made the lamp for Melisande - has facial features similar to her father, and is very dear to her. She is disturbed in the months leading up to the marriage because her father has banished Yusef from their household, and won't tell her why. After marrying de Hervey, they go on the monthlong journey by horseback to the coast of France, Wissant and sail to Dover, and from there to their own home - Littleperry Manor - within his family's estate, Greatperry Hall, in Gloucester, England.

As Melisande settles in, she frequently conflicts with The Lady Constance and dame Anne Peckham, who were united in their disapproval of her for being French and of a less wealthy background. Soon Melisande is expecting a child, and when the packmen arrive with goods for sale as well as mail delivery, she receives a letter from Tristan stating that Yusef has died, apparently committed suicide the day after her departure. Melisande's grief takes everyone's efforts to overcome. When Joscelin is born, everyone is happy and even Lady Constance seems to finally accept Melisande. Five years later, a terrible wet spring after a vicious winter results in the death of Hugo, only after disease murrain sickened the sheep. In time, the children marry, and Melisande starts to plan to visit her parents for the first time - when King Edward III declares war on France. With close family members in both the English and French armies, Melisande is alone with her despair. She has a vision of a young child dressed very unusually - very simply - with hair short, in a chair with wheels. When she learns of pending grandchildren, she starts to hope that the young girl in her vision belongs to the future of Littleperry. Part I ends with Melisande hanging a red cross on a white sheet at the manor walls, to warn anyone coming by that the Plague had struck.

Part II begins as Alys turns 12, and leaves her grandmother's house to become part of the staff at Littleperry where she becomes good friends with Cicely, the Squire's daughter. After suffering a mysterious stigma by the behaviour of everyone in the household, eventually she compels her grandmother to tell her the truth - that Squire Edwin loved her mother and fathered her, but since he never married her mother, she had no social position. As she becomes increasing bitter, she hatches a plan to accomplish several goals: to marry Perkin, free Cicely from an unwanted marriage the Squire arranged, and take revenge on her father's betrayal. As Alys, Cicely and Perkin arrive in London with the saracen lamp at Alder's Gate, they locate Amy and settle in. Alys sells the saracen lamp for less than its worth, to have funds for the rest of her plan and free herself of the guilt of taking it. However the destructiveness of her plans has unintended effects. In the end she returns alone to Littleperry, and tries to undo as much damage as she can.

Part III narrated by Perdita is set in the present day. Perdita's parents are devoted missionaries who minister in Africa, and her grandmother is the last remaining Harvey still living in Littleperry. Just before her thirteenth birthday, plans are made for her to remain in England and attend a boarding school near Littleperry, however she develops an ailment and lives at Littleperry instead, with the vicar's wife coming in to give her short lessons. As she struggles with her illness, she becomes haunted by the ghost of Alys, who wants her to remain weak and unhappy. With the help of others in the family and an outsider, she becomes strong again. And a copy of the saracen lamp comes to rest again in its place at Littleperry.

== Characters ==
- Melisande, young French woman (demoiselle) who marries into English nobility
- Melisande's Father, seriously wounded in last of King Louis' Crusades against the Saracens
- Yusef - or Joseph - Islamic Saracen bondsman in Melisande's household, a trusted member of the family
- Tristan & Gabriel - Melisande's brothers
- Dame Marguerite - Melisande's personal maid and permanent housekeeper
- Sir Hugh de Hervey - marries Melisande
- The Lady Constance and The Old Knight - Sir Hugh's parents
- Melisande's grandfather, who had fought in the first two crusades, and was now living in Aigues Mortes
- Dame Anne Peckham, temporary housekeeper to Melisande and Sir Hugh
- Thomas Peckham, Anne's younger brother, Sir Hugh's steward, and in time Dame Marguerite's husband
- Margery Caldecott, local woman who Melisande chooses to be her personal maid
- Joscelin, Robert & Michael, Margot and Henry de Hervey - sons and daughter of Melisande and Hugh
- Alys - narrator of part II, who learns that she is Squire Harvey's illegitimate daughter
- Alys' Grandmother
- Squire Edwin Harvey, master of Littleperry, successful businessman in the woolen industry
- Miss Cicely, the Squire's daughter, who is a year younger than Alys
- Mistress Roke, housekeeper and 'upper servant' of Littleperry and a friend of Alys' grandmother
- Miss Winter, Cicely's governess, who treats Alys poorly but includes her in lessons
- Perkin Elder, local young man whom Alys falls in love with
- Amy Price, Alys' second cousin who lives in London
- Perdita - narrator of Part III, 13-year-old girl living at Littleperry with her grandmother in the present day
- Grandmother Harvey - Perdita's grandmother
- Old Nod - housekeeper at Littleperry, descendant of Mistress Roke
- Mrs. Finley - vicar's wife who gives Perdita lessons

== Saracen Lamp ==
The beautiful lamp is gold with stained glass, made for Melisande by Yusef, her close friend and trusted bondsman (servant) of her father's household. Giving it to Melisande, Yusef says, I have made it with my own hands, in the style of my country, while I have been here in banishment. Treasure it within your walls, keep it alight that the flame of your spirit may never be quenched.'

Within the novel, the lamp is described as being 'made of gold, intricately and delicately worked in a pattern of flowers, very rare and beautiful. Its light shone through rich colors like the stained glass windows in the Abbey, ruby, emerald, and amethyst glass, set like huge stones around its flame. It hung like a jeweled pendant on its slender chain.'

== Historical References ==
Three days after Melisande and Sir Hugh arrive at Littleperry, his parents visit and Sir Hugh's father speaks of their recent visit with King Edward and his bride, Isabella at Windsor, and Queen Isabella being 18 at the time.

After Hugo dies, packmen and roving theater players brought news of drama at the court of King Edward II, and then the celebrations around King Edward III and his new French queen, Queen Philippa in 1327.

Family members fight in both sides of the Hundred Years' War starting in 1337, while the Plague ends the life of the narrator of part I.

Part II opens in the 1560s mentioning the new prayer book and poor sad Queen Mary who longed for a son, her husband Spanish Philip, and the horrible prosecutions happening all around them.

== Reception ==
'As intricately wrought as the little lamp,' is how Baron describes The Saracen Lamp, adding 'the girls don't seem so compellingly real as some of Ruth Arthur's earlier heroines.' Historical details in The Saracen Lamp are often the reader's first experience with those periods in history.
