= Patricia Garwood =

English actress (1941–2019)

- Born: 28 January 1941; Paignton, Devon, England
- Died: 24 February 2019 (aged 78); England
- Occupation: Actress
- Years active: 1951–2019
- Children: 4

Patricia Garwood (28 January 1941 – 24 February 2019) was an English television, film and stage actress who first appeared on film aged 9 in The Lavender Hill Mob and is best known as playing Beryl Crabtree in five series of the BBC situation comedy No Place Like Home between 1983 and 1987.

Garwood was born in Paignton, Devon, on 28 January 1941. She was trained at the Arts Educational School and the Royal Academy of Dramatic Art. Garwood married in 1960 and had four daughters. Garwood died from non-Hodgkin lymphoma in February 2019 at the age of 78.

== Filmography ==
Year	Title	Role	Notes
1951	The Lavender Hill Mob	Girl	uncredited
1953	The Golden Head	Schoolgirl	as Pat Garwood, TV Film
1954	The Scarlet Eagle	Cicely Dunham	as Pat Garwood, TV Film
1955	Absent-Minded Anna	Juliet Scott	as Pat Garwood, TV Film
1955	Passage of Arms	Louisa Braganza	TV film
1956	The Branksome Pearls	Jane Golden	as Pat Garwood, TV Film
1959	Carry On Teacher	Schoolgirl	uncredited
1961	The Wind of Change	Lina	
1961	Petticoat Pirates	Wren (Linen Store)	

== Television appearances ==
Date	Programme	Character
1975	Within These Walls	Jean Trevelyan
1978	Clouds of Glory (miniseries)	Edith Southey
1979	Danger UXB	Mrs Busby
1982	The Brack Report	Pat Brack
1983–1987	No Place Like Home	Beryl Crabtree
1986	Lytton's Diary	Lydia Freeman
1986	The Return of Sherlock Holmes (The Man with the Twisted Lip)	Mrs. Whitney
1995	Is It Legal? (Bob Breaks In)	Belinda Foulkes
1998	The Ruth Rendell Mysteries (Road Rage)	Kitty Struther

== Stage ==
In January 1998, Garwood appeared at the Orange Tree Theatre, Richmond, starring in David Lewis's Bad Faith opposite Osmund Bullock.
