= It All Goes to Show =

1969 British film by Francis Searle

- Still from film
- Directed by: Francis Searle
- Written by: Ian Flintoff
- Produced by: Francis Searle
- Starring: Arthur Lowe; Bill Maynard
- Cinematography: Terry Maher
- Edited by: Peter Mayhew
- Release date: 1969
- Running time: 28 min.
- Country: United Kingdom
- Language: English

It All Goes to Show is a 1969 British short comedy film directed by Francis Searle and starring Arthur Lowe and Bill Maynard. It was written by Ian Flintoff.

It All Goes to Show is one of a series of 30-minute films directed by Searle in the "Screen Miniatures" series, which he made between 1966 and 1972. Others in the series are Miss MacTaggart Won’t Lie Down (1966), The Pale Faced Girl (1968), Talk of the Devil (1968), Gold Is Where You Find It (1968) and A Couple of Beauties (1972).

== Plot ==
Councillor Henry Parker, Secretary of Brightsea Bay Entertainments Committee has to seek out talent for the summer show. He bumps into old British Army comrade Mike Sago and the two reignite their double act.

== Cast ==
- Arthur Lowe as Councillor Henry Parker
- Bill Maynard as Mike Sago
- Tim Barrett as Rev. Blunt
- Sheila Keith as Councillor Mrs. Parker
- Valerie Van Ost as Angela
- Norman Pitt as Chairman of Committee
- Joan Cooper
- Middleton Woods
- Bunty Garland
- Josephine Blair

== Reception ==
The British Film Institute wrote: "Dad’s Army star Arthur Lowe is in great form as hen-pecked Margate town councillor Henry Parker in this comedy short. ... Henry’s prudish wife is brilliantly played by the underrated Sheila Keith".
