= The Brack Report =

- Cover of "The Brack Report" novel
- Genre: Drama
- Screenplay by: Christopher Penfold
- Starring: Donald Sumpter; Patricia Garwood; Jenny Seagrove
- Composer: Christopher Gunning
- Country of origin: United Kingdom
- Original language: English
- No. of series: 1
- No. of episodes: 10

Production
- Running time: 60 minutes
- Production company: Thames Television

Original release
- Network: ITV
- Release: 6 April – 8 June 1982

The Brack Report is a British television drama series created by Christopher Penfold for Thames Television looking at concerns about nuclear power, and exploring some alternative energy sources. It was broadcast over 10 weeks on ITV from 6 April 1982 to 8 June 1982 which overlapped with the Falklands War. It stars Donald Sumpter, Patricia Garwood and Jenny Seagrove.

== Plot ==
After an earthquake causes some damage to a nuclear power station, one of the chief nuclear physicists, Paul Brack, starts to investigate the safety procedures and policies of the station. He is dismayed to discover that there is a lack of real safety processes at the station, and quits his job in disgust. His disillusionment puts a strain on his relationship with his wife, Pat, a fellow researcher and academic.

Through a mutual friend, Brack meets and begins to work for energy consultant Harold Harlan, with hopes that Harlan can highlight the issue of nuclear safety, and explore alternative energy sources. Unfortunately Harlan has his own plans for how he can use Brack.

== Cast ==
=== Main cast ===
- Donald Sumpter as Paul Brack
- Patricia Garwood as Pat Brack
- Jenny Seagrove as Angela Brack
- Neil Nisbet as Oliver Brack
- Robert Lang as Harold Harlan
- Toria Fuller as Sophie Ferris
- Sue Robinson as Sarah Challen
- Antony Carrick as Norman Phillips
- Tom Chadbon as Brian Fletcher

=== Guest cast ===
- Geoffrey Beevers as Dr. Scheer
- Graham Crowden as Max Challen
- T. P. McKenna as Frank Clements
- Daniel Massey as Andrei Tchenkov
- Judy Parfitt as Ella Smitherson
- Tony Steedman as Dr. Smitherson
- Wanda Ventham as Kate Randall
- Jerome Willis as John Robertson

== Episodes ==
No. overall	No. in series	Title	Directed by	Written by	UK release date
1	1	"Chapter 1"	Gordon Flemyng	Christopher Penfold	6 April 1982
An earthquake near one of Britain's nuclear power stations leads to a potential disaster, and Chief Scientist Paul Brack is deeply unhappy with the safety protocols in place.
2	2	"Chapter 2"	Bill Bain	Christopher Penfold	13 April 1982
Brack is disappointed when his employers try to cover up the earthquake damage at Wintersham power station, but his wife urges him to give consideration to his family before making decisions about his future.
3	3	"Chapter 3"	Alan Cooke	John Elliot	20 April 1982
On the advice of an old friend Brack joins energy consultant Harold Harlan, who he thinks is someone that can bring about change in nuclear policy, but Harlan has his own reasons for employing Brack.
4	4	"Chapter 4"	Alan Cooke	John Elliot	27 April 1982
Brack investigates the viability of coal as the main supplier of energy in the future, and visits a coal mine to understand modern mining techniques. He also begins to write a detailed report on Britain's range of potential energy options for Harlan.
5	5	"Chapter 5"	John Frankau, Mike Gibbon	Bruce Stewart	5 May 1982
Brack's obsession with a potential government cover up results in damage to the chances for electricity generating windmills to become more mainstream. At home Paul's wife asks him for a separation.
6	6	"Chapter 6"	Cyril Coke	Christopher Penfold	11 May 1982
Brack looks into using waste to generate power and heat, combined with passive solar heating. His hopes are dashed for any progress when a forward-thinking politician dies in a road accident. Paul begins a relationship with fellow researcher Sarah Challen.
7	7	"Chapter 7"	Bill Bain	David Pinner	18 May 1982
Harlan goes to Tynemouth to explore the possibility of using wave power to generate electricity, and he manages to cajole two top research laboratories to work together in advancing the field. Meanwhile Paul's wife learns of his affair with Sarah.
8	8	"Chapter 8"	Bill Bain	Christopher Penfold	25 May 1982
Brack's Soviet colleague, Andrei Tchenkov, has made a breakthrough in fusion research that he is willing to share with the UK Atomic Energy Authority, but the UK government sells him and his research to the Americans.
9	9	"Chapter 9"	Cyril Coke	John Elliot	1 June 1982
Brack visits France to explore the viability of tidal underwater turbines, but the UK government decides to completely discount alternative energies and back the nuclear option. Paul and his wife must decide if they are going to divorce.
10	10	"Chapter 10"	Cyril Coke	Christopher Penfold	8 June 1982
Brack completes his report on alternative energies, and with Harlan's help it goes to parliament. Paul and his wife decide to give their marriage a second chance. The episode ends with the credit "FINAL EPISODE – Thank you for watching – The Brack Report".

== Production ==
=== Writing ===
The show's creator, Christopher Penfold, was previously a writer on Space: 1999 (a show where a nuclear accident on the Moon causes it to be knocked out of orbit), and he developed The Brack Report as a means of exploring and dramatizing some of the challenges of nuclear power, as well as looking at some of the alternative ways of generating energy.

=== Music ===
The theme tune was composed by Christopher Gunning, who had been composing music for film and TV for twelve years when he completed this piece. Other notable work by Gunning includes the themes for Rogue Male (1976), The Day of the Triffids (1981), Porterhouse Blue (1987), Under Suspicion (1991), Lighthouse Hill (2004), and La Vie en rose (2007).

=== Filming ===
Filming of the series took over a year to complete. Geoffrey Beevers, who played Dr. Scheer in Episodes 4 and 7, had to be excused from filming on 17 December 1980 to shoot scenes for the Doctor Who serial "The Keeper of Traken" which had been delayed due to an electricians strike.

Some exterior scenes for Episode 7 were filmed in Tynemouth, including at Tynemouth Castle and Priory. Some exterior scenes for Episode 9 were filmed at the Rance Tidal Power Station in Brittany, France. Some interior scenes were filmed at Pinewood Studios.

== Broadcast ==
- United Kingdom: It was originally broadcast on ITV in 1982
- Australia: In 1983 it was shown on SBS Australia
- Germany: In 1983–1984 it was broadcast on ARD
- United Kingdom (again): In 2020 it was broadcast by Talking Pictures TV

== Reception ==
Creator Christopher Penfold commented that the transmission of the series (6 April to 8 June 1982) "got absolutely swamped by the Falklands War" (2 April to 14 June 1982), and that the show "would have created a much bigger public stir" had it not been for that war.

Episode One was referred to the Broadcasting Complaints Commission by the Central Electricity Generating Board. The UK Atomic Energy Authority also expressed their concerns over the series.

A contemporary review by Lucy Hughes-Hallett, writing in The Times, noted that the weighty subject-matter made for a ponderous narrative: "artistically…not a great success" but allowed that it was "an…intelligent attempt to tackle a difficult subject". Another contemporary review by Chris Dunkley of the Financial Times noted that the show was being broadcast in the same slot that had been previously occupied by drama series Muck and Brass (starring Mel Smith), and he felt those shows were evidence that ITV have a "sane and admirable new policy of creating modern drama series dealing with contemporary themes".

== In other media ==
=== Books ===
A 192-page novelization of "The Brack Report", written by Patrick Winter, was released on 15 March 1982 by Arrow Books publishers.

== See also ==
- The Day After Tomorrow, a 1975 television drama set in a future where environmental damage on threatens the survival of humanity.
- The China Syndrome, a 1979 American drama film concerning safety coverups at a nuclear power plant.
- The Chain Reaction, a 1980 Australian thriller film about an engineer who tries to warm the public about possible nuclear waste
- Dark Circle, a 1982 American documentary on the connections between the nuclear weapons and the nuclear power industries.
- Silkwood, a 1983 American biographical film of nuclear whistleblower and labour union activist Karen Silkwood.
- The Day After, a 1983 American television film exploring a potential nuclear exchange between the United States and the Soviet Union.
- Threads, a 1984 drama television film about nuclear war and its effects on the city of Sheffield in Northern England.
