= Clouds of Glory =

1978 television film directed by Ken Russell

Clouds of Glory is a 1978 British television series of documentaries directed by Ken Russell. It was co-written by Melvyn Bragg. It was Russell and Bragg's fifth collaboration on a biographical work.

Two episodes were produced, William and Dorothy (on William Wordsworth and his sister Dorothy) and The Rime of the Ancient Mariner (on Samuel Taylor Coleridge). The Los Angeles Times called it "flat out brilliant". A third planned episode, King of the Crocodiles (on Robert Southey) was cancelled for financial reasons.

Filming locations included Derwentwater, Thirlmere, Troutbeck, and Borrowdale, and a cottage in Stonethwaite was used to represent the Wordsworths' home, Dove Cottage.

== Cast ==
- David Warner as William Wordsworth
- Felicity Kendal as Dorothy Wordsworth
- David Hemmings as Samuel Coleridge
- Ben Aris as Robert Southey
- Patricia Garwood as Edith Southey
- Kika Markham as Sara Coleridge
- Preston Lockwood as Dr. Carr
- Murray Melvin as Robert Lovell
- William Hootkins as Reverend Dewey
- Patricia Quinn as Annette Vallon
