= Francis Searle =

British film director (1909–2002)

Francis Searle (14 March 1909 – 31 July 2002) was an English film director, writer and producer. He was active in the post-Second World War cinema industry. Amongst the films he directed were The Lady Craved Excitement (1950), One Way Out (1955) and It All Goes to Show (1969).

Searle's later projects were all short films, either comedies or dramas, with his final film being made in 1971 (released in 1973).

== Selected filmography ==
- A Girl in a Million (1946)
- Things Happen at Night (1947)
- Man in Black (1949)
- Celia (1949)
- A Case for PC 49 (1951)
- Cloudburst (1951)
- Love's a Luxury (1952)
- Never Look Back (1952)
- Profile (1954)
- The Gelignite Gang (1956)
- Day of Grace (1957) (short, Hammer production)
- Undercover Girl (1958)
- The Diplomatic Corpse (1958)
- Freedom to Die (1961)
- Ticket to Paradise (1961)
- Gaolbreak (1962)
- Emergency (1962)
- Dead Man's Evidence (1962)
- Night of the Prowler (1962)
- The Marked One (1963)
- Miss MacTaggart Won't Lie Down (1966) (short)
- The Pale Faced Girl (1968) (short)
- Talk of the Devil (1968) (short)
- Gold Is Where You Find It (1968) (short)
- It All Goes to Show (1969) (short)
- A Hole Lot of Trouble (1971) (short)
- A Couple of Beauties (rel. 1973) (short)
