= No Place Like Home (TV series) =

- Genre: Sitcom
- Created by: Jon Watkins
- Starring: William Gaunt; Patricia Garwood; Martin Clunes (series 1-3); Andrew Charleson (series 4-5)
- Country of origin: United Kingdom
- Original language: English
- No. of series: 5
- No. of episodes: 43

Production
- Running time: 30 minutes

Original release
- Network: BBC1
- Release: 13 December 1983 – 27 October 1987

No Place Like Home is a BBC sitcom created and written by Jon Watkins. It was directed and produced by Robin Nash, starring William Gaunt and Patricia Garwood as Arthur and Beryl Crabtree. Arthur has a brand new life planned with Beryl now that the last of their four children has left home, or so he believes.

No Place Like Home was broadcast for five series between 1983 and 1987. Technically, six series were made, but series 3 (7 episodes), which was intended for broadcast in 1985, was subsequently aired from January 1986, back to back with series 4 (6 episodes). This resulted in both of these series merging to become an extended series 3, with 13 episodes, ending in April 1986.

Later in October 1986, a new series 4 of seven episodes aired, and a final fifth series of 8 episodes was broadcast in 1987. The sitcom featured the first regular roles on television for Martin Clunes and Marcia Warren.

== Plot ==
"...Arthur and Beryl Crabtree had raised four children and looked forward to the day when their time once again would be their own; a second honeymoon was planned as the last of their offspring finally left home. However, their hopes were soon dashed as one by one the fledglings returned to the nest disillusioned with life in the outside world. For the children there was no place like home. The eldest of the children was Lorraine who had married traffic warden Raymond Codd but cast him aside in the final series. Raymond is replaced by a similar character, Roger Duff, in Lorraine's affections. There was also Nigel, a veterinary student, Paul and Tracey (and their assorted girlfriends and boyfriends), while the Crabtrees' domestic bliss was also disturbed by their nosey neighbours the Bottings, particularly the shrieking, animal-loving Vera. Arthur, and Vera's husband Trevor, often escaped to the greenhouse when things became unbearable, seeking solace in a glass of home-made sherry...."

== Cast ==
| Character | Actor | Series |
|---|---|---|
| Arthur Crabtree | William Gaunt | all |
| Beryl Crabtree | Patricia Garwood | all |
| Nigel Crabtree | Martin Clunes Andrew Charleson | 1–3 4–5 |
| Paul Crabtree | Stephen Watson | 1–4 |
| Tracy Crabtree | Dee Sadler | all |
| Lorraine Codd | Beverley Adams | all |
| Raymond Codd | Daniel Hill | 1–4 |
| Vera Botting | Marcia Warren Ann Penfold | 1–3 5 |
| Trevor Botting | Michael Sharvell-Martin | all |
| Roger Duff | Roger Martin | 5 |

== Episodes ==
=== Series 1 (1983–84) ===
| No. overall | No. in series | Title | Original release date |
|---|---|---|---|
| 1 | 1 | "No Place Like Home" | 13 December 1983 |
| 2 | 2 | "One Enchanted Evening" | 20 December 1983 |
| 3 | 3 | "Home and Away" | 3 January 1984 |
| 4 | 4 | "Just the Job" | 10 January 1984 |
| 5 | 5 | "Alternative Accommodation" | 17 January 1984 |
| 6 | 6 | "Goodbye Father" | 24 January 1984 |

=== Series 2 (1984) ===
| No. overall | No. in series | Title | Original release date |
|---|---|---|---|
| 7 | 1 | "Grandfather Time" | 12 September 1984 |
| 8 | 2 | "Our Hero" | 19 September 1984 |
| 9 | 3 | "Golden Handshake" | 26 September 1984 |
| 10 | 4 | "The Curfew" | 3 October 1984 |
| 11 | 5 | "The Mating Season" | 10 October 1984 |
| 12 | 6 | "It’s Only Your Father" | 17 October 1984 |
| 13 | 7 | "Don’t Tell Mother" | 24 October 1984 |
| 14 | 8 | "Who Loves Ya Baby" | 31 October 1984 |

=== Christmas Special (1984) ===
| No. overall | No. in series | Title | Original release date |
|---|---|---|---|
| 15 | 1 | "A Crabtree Christmas" | 26 December 1984 |

=== Series 3 (1986) ===
| No. overall | No. in series | Title | Original release date |
|---|---|---|---|
| 16 | 1 | "Marriage Guidance" | 8 January 1986 |
| 17 | 2 | "Arthur Acting" | 15 January 1986 |
| 18 | 3 | "Comings and Goings" | 22 January 1986 |
| 19 | 4 | "The Summons" | 29 January 1986 |
| 20 | 5 | "The Crabtree Code" | 5 February 1986 |
| 21 | 6 | "Happy Families – Part 1" | 19 February 1986 |
| 22 | 7 | "Happy Families – Part 2" | 26 February 1986 |
| 23 | 8 | "Dear Miss Davenport" | 12 March 1986 |
| 24 | 9 | "Great Uncle Herbert" | 19 March 1986 |
| 25 | 10 | "Trevor’s Last Stand" | 26 March 1986 |
| 26 | 11 | "The Video" | 9 April 1986 |
| 27 | 12 | "Arthur’s Move" | 16 April 1986 |
| 28 | 13 | "Silver Wedding" | 23 April 1986 |

=== Series 4 (1986) ===
| No. overall | No. in series | Title | Original release date |
|---|---|---|---|
| 29 | 1 | "Marital Difficulties" | 14 October 1986 |
| 30 | 2 | "Mixed Doubles" | 21 October 1986 |
| 31 | 3 | "Sons and Lovers" | 28 October 1986 |
| 32 | 4 | "The Reunion" | 4 November 1986 |
| 33 | 5 | "Raymond’s Rotten Luck" | 11 November 1986 |
| 34 | 6 | "The Great Escape" | 18 November 1986 |
| 35 | 7 | "Beryl Branches Out" | 25 November 1986 |

=== Series 5 (1987) ===
| No. overall | No. in series | Title | Original release date |
|---|---|---|---|
| 36 | 1 | "Take Your Partners" | 8 September 1987 |
| 37 | 2 | "Fortifying the Over-Forties" | 15 September 1987 |
| 38 | 3 | "The Dinner Party" | 22 September 1987 |
| 39 | 4 | "Domestic Help" | 29 September 1987 |
| 40 | 5 | "The Marathon" | 6 October 1987 |
| 41 | 6 | "Gone Fishing" | 13 October 1987 |
| 42 | 7 | "The Attachment" | 20 October 1987 |
| 43 | 8 | "Hero" | 27 October 1987 |

== Recasting ==
Like several comedies from the 1980s and 90s (Bread, Goodnight Sweetheart, and May to December are good examples), the last two series suffered from recasts and popular characters disappearing without explanation. Both Marcia Warren and Martin Clunes, who both played arguably the series' most popular characters, left at the end of the extended series 3 in 1986. Clunes' character, Nigel Crabtree, was immediately recast with Andrew Charleson taking over the part. Warren's character, the potty animal lover, Vera Botting, was rested for series 4, but returned in series 5, played by Ann Penfold.

The eldest Crabtree son, Paul, last appeared during series 4 and the character was not recast due to the death of actor Stephen Watson on his honeymoon during the filming of series 4.

== Ratings ==
There's a popular myth that the recasting of characters led to the decline in popularity of the series. This isn't actually true: in actual fact, the final two series both had higher ratings than the third.

During the first two years the ratings published for television were in the form of "Top 10 per channel", with only one episode (2.6) reaching the BBC1 Top 10 with 9.95 million viewers. The ratings for the remaining three series were as follows:

| Episode | Broadcast Date | Rating | Chart Position |
|---|---|---|---|
| 3.1 | 08/01/1986 | 6.62 | 69 |
| 3.2 | 15/01/1986 | 7.18 | 65 |
| 3.3 | 22/01/1986 | 7.96 | 62 |
| 3.4 | 29/01/1986 | 8.61 | 53 |
| 3.5 | 05/02/1986 | 8.15 | 63 |
| 3.6 | 19/02/1986 | 8.29 | 58 |
| 3.7 | 26/02/1986 | 8.65 | 51 |
| 3.8 | 12/03/1986 | 9.59 | 38 |
| 3.9 | 19/03/1986 | 9.64 | 38 |
| 3.10 | 26/03/1986 | 8.77 | 47 |
| 3.11 | 09/04/1986 | 9.65 | 29 |
| 3.12 | 13/04/1986 | 9.15 | 39 |
| 3.13 | 23/04/1986 | 9.0 | 24 |
| 4.1 | 14/10/1986 | 10.3 | 24 |
| 4.2 | 21/10/1986 | 9.33 | 34 |
| 4.3 | 28/10/1986 | 9.82 | 28 |
| 4.4 | 04/11/1986 | 10.21 | 28 |
| 4.5 | 11/11/1986 | 9.65 | 37 |
| 4.6 | 18/11/1986 | 9.69 | 36 |
| 4.7 | 25/11/1986 | 10.25 | 25 |
| 5.1 | 08/09/1987 | 7.4 | 46 |
| 5.2 | 15/09/1987 | 7.6 | 47 |
| 5.3 | 22/09/1987 | 7.0 | 56 |
| 5.4 | 29/09/1987 | 8.6 | 39 |
| 5.5 | 06/10/1987 | 9.6 | 36 |
| 5.6 | 13/10/1987 | 10.3 | 27 |
| 5.7 | 20/10/1987 | 9.4 | 35 |
| 5.8 | 27/10/1987 | 9.9 | 36 |

== DVD releases ==
The first two series of No Place Like Home were released in 2006.
