= Dr. Terror's House of Horrors =

1965 anthology horror film by Freddie Francis

Dr Terror's House of Horrors
- Directed by: Freddie Francis
- Written by: Milton Subotsky
- Produced by: Max Rosenberg; Milton Subotsky
- Starring: Peter Cushing; Christopher Lee; Kenny Lynch; Max Adrian; Michael Gough; Neil McCallum; Ann Bell; Donald Sutherland; Jennifer Jayne; Bernard Lee; Roy Castle
- Cinematography: Alan Hume
- Edited by: Thelma Connell
- Music by: Elisabeth Lutyens
- Production company: Amicus Productions
- Distributed by: Regal Films International (UK)
- Release date: 23 February 1965
- Running time: 98 minutes
- Country: United Kingdom
- Language: English
- Budget: £105,209

Dr Terror's House of Horrors is a 1965 British anthology horror film directed by Freddie Francis and produced by Amicus Productions. It was the first horror film from Amicus and the first in a series of distinctive anthology (or 'portmanteau') films by the company.

The film comprises five segments and a wraparound, with a cast featuring Peter Cushing, Christopher Lee, Max Adrian, Ann Bell, Michael Gough, Neil McCallum, Jennifer Jayne, Bernard Lee, Donald Sutherland, and Roy Castle. The musical score was composed by Elisabeth Lutyens.

Dr Terror's House of Horrors was released by Regal Films International on February 28, 1965.

== Plot ==
=== Prologue ===
Five men, one by one, enter a train compartment in a London station bound for the town of Bradley, and are joined by a sixth, the mysterious Doctor Schreck (German for "terror"). During the journey, the doctor opens his pack of Tarot cards (which he calls his "House of Horrors") and proceeds to reveal the destinies of each of the travellers. This provides the framework to tell five horror stories.

=== "Werewolf" ===
Architect Jim Dawson returns to his old family home in the Hebrides to make renovations for the new owner, Mrs. Biddulph. Biddulph explains she bought the secluded house to help her recover from the death of her husband, to whose memory she would like to dedicate a newly enlarged room as a museum.

Dawson finds behind a fake wall in the cellar the coffin of Count Cosmo Valdemar. Valdemar, the original owner of the house, was killed in a conflict with the Dawson family centuries ago. Local legend states that Valdemar would reclaim his former home and take revenge on the current owner. Dawson discovers that Valdemar is rising at night as a werewolf, and has already killed a housemaid.

Believing Mrs. Biddulph to be in danger, he makes silver bullets out of an ancestral cross that was produced from the sword historically used to kill the monster. However, when the creature surges again from his tomb in the cellar, Dawson is baffled to find such bullets ineffective. He runs upstairs to protect Mrs. Biddulph within her room, but the lady reveals that she has replaced the ammunition with ordinary ones. She clarifies how the actual curse meant that Valdemar will take revenge on the last descendant of the Dawson clan, not on the current owner of the estate; and that his death and placement in Valdemar's coffin will fully restore the werewolf to life in human form. It was all a trap: Biddulph is Valdemar's wife, who has returned from the grave after 200 years and proceeds to attack and kill Dawson.

=== "Creeping Vine" ===
Bill Rogers and his wife and daughter return from their holiday to discover a fast-growing vine in the garden. When the plant seems to respond violently to attempts to cut it down, Rogers goes to the Ministry of Defence, where he gets advice from a couple of scientists. The plant shows increasing signs of intelligence, murderous intent and self-preservation, first killing the family dog, then one of the scientists, and finally snapping the telephone line and then blocking all windows and doors to the house. Fire appears for a few moments to scare it away, until that too becomes ineffective as the vine learns to put out a flame.

=== "Voodoo" ===
Biff Bailey is a happy-go-lucky jazz musician, who promptly accepts a gig in the West Indies with his band. Upon witnessing a local voodoo ceremony, he loves the exotic rhythm and tries to pitch on the natives the idea to use it as template for new commercial music.

Despite warnings not to "steal" the sacred tunes from the god, Biff tries to use them for a jazz performance back in London, overtly mocking that religion. The show is suddenly halted by a violently stormy wind which makes the public flee, and leads Bailey as well to leave the stage and stumble in the streets until he comes across a garish poster for "Dr Terror's House of Horrors". He runs to the safety of his home, only to discover that there is more to come.

=== "Disembodied Hand" ===
Pompous art critic Franklyn Marsh seems more concerned with his own devastating wit than art itself. Painter Eric Landor bears the brunt of one of Marsh's tirades, but gets even by humiliating the critic publicly. He shows that Marsh mistakes the work of a chimpanzee for modern art, and subsequently follows him at public speeches and social gatherings, silencing his contributions mid-way with shameful reminders of the error. Increasingly exasperated, finally Marsh retaliates by running over Landor with his car, causing Landor to lose the right hand. Unable to paint any more, Landor commits suicide. From this moment Marsh is tormented by the disembodied hand of the artist, which seems immune to fire and any other attempts to contain it. In a last attack while Marsh is driving, the car crashes and the broken window leads to Marsh's permanent blindness.

=== "Vampire" ===
Dr Bob Carroll returns to his home in New England with his new French bride, Nicolle. Soon there is evidence that a vampire is on the loose, and Carroll seeks the aid of his colleague, Dr Blake. They find proof that Nicolle is the vampire, and she at one point stalks Blake, until being scared off when he raises his arms protectively and accidentally casts the shadow of a cross. All the evidence clearly shows that she is responsible, and, following Blake's advice, Carroll tearfully stakes his beloved Nicolle. When the police come to arrest Carroll for his wife's murder, Blake denies giving any such advice. As the police take Carroll away, Blake says to himself that the town isn't big enough for two doctors, or two vampires, and he turns into a bat.

=== Epilogue ===
After showing sympathy to all his fellow passengers and attempting not to show them the prediction of death that all received from the tarots' deck, Dr. Schreck informs the men that this would be the only way that they could escape the forecast of an even more horrible destiny. He then vanishes during a moment of darkness. Puzzled and fearful, the men have a moment of relief when the train stops and they assume this to mean they have reached the intended destination. At the station however they are alone in a dark, silent and spooky atmosphere. The wind then carries a newspaper, with the report of an accident in which they all died. Schreck reappears in a black mantel and is revealed to be Death himself. The men begin to slowly follow him in the darkness.

== Cast ==
=== Wraparound ===
- Peter Cushing as Dr. Schreck

=== "Werewolf" ===
- Neil McCallum as Jim Dawson
- Ursula Howells as Deirdre Biddulph
- Peter Madden as Caleb
- Katy Wild as Valda
- Edward Underdown as Tod

=== "Creeping Vine" ===
- Ann Bell as Ann Rogers
- Bernard Lee as Hopkins
- Alan Freeman as Bill Rogers
- Jeremy Kemp as Jerry Drake
- Sarah Nicholls as Carol Rogers

=== "Voodoo" ===
- Roy Castle as Biff Bailey
- Kenny Lynch as Sammy Coin
- Harold Lang as Roy Shine
- Christopher Carlos as Vrim
- Thomas Baptiste as Dambala

=== "Disembodied Hand" ===
- Christopher Lee as Franklyn Marsh
- Michael Gough as Eric Landor
- Isla Blair as pretty girl
- Judy Cornwell as nurse
- Hedger Wallace as surgeon

=== "Vampire" ===
- Max Adrian as Dr. Blake
- Donald Sutherland as Dr. Bob Carroll
- Jennifer Jayne as Nicolle Carroll
- Al Mulock as police detective
- Laurie Leigh as nurse

== Production ==
=== Development and writing ===
Dr. Terror's House of Horrors was a conscious attempt by Milton Subotsky to repeat the success of Dead of Night (1945). Subotsky considered that movie to be "the greatest horror film ever," and used it as a blueprint for Dr. Terror and the rest of Amicus's portmanteau films. The script began as an unmade television series in 1948 during the time when Dead of Night was a recent release. Subotsky wrote the original stories in 1948 when he was employed as a scriptwriter for NBC's Lights Out series.

=== Casting ===
The film was one of the earliest screen credits of Donald Sutherland, his third credited (and fourth overall) film appearance. He had previously worked alongside Christopher Lee in Castle of the Living Dead. The actor was paid £1,000 (equivalent to £16,930 in 2025) for his performance. Sutherland later recalled he only took the role for the money.

Musician Acker Bilk was originally set to star in the "Voodoo" segment. However, he suffered a heart attack before shooting started, and was replaced by Roy Castle. Castle was an accomplished jazz trumpeter, but due to union rules his performance in the film was dubbed over by professional musician Tubby Hayes. Hayes' quintet appears as Bailey's backing band. Castle later released a recording of his own version, "Dr. Terror's House Of Horrors/Voodoo Girl", on vinyl.

=== Filming ===
Filming began on Dr. Terror's House of Horrors at Shepperton Studios on 25 May 1964 with a budget of £105,000 and was completed on 3 July 1964. The film was shot in Techniscope.

== Critical reception ==
The Monthly Film Bulletin wrote: "Except perhaps in the fourth story, which borrows freely from The Beast with Five Fingers, this horror anthology is filmically near-negligible compared to the best of Riccardo Freda. Moreover it lapses into crudity in the weakest, Voodoo story, with too many brash comedy asides from Roy Castle and others. Yet four of the stories are undeniably compulsive, thanks to ironic variations played on familiar routines, and to several strong performances. Max Adrian delivers a memorably sardonic afterthought to his betrayal of the newly-wed doctor forced to destroy his vampire spouse: "There isn't room for two doctors and two vampires in a small town." The revelation that that most demure, rational and attractive of actresses, Ursula Howells, is a werewolf is also pleasing; as is the foresight of the killer-vine ('Just as I thought: a brain' muses a botanist, examining one of its leaves through a microscope) when it severs the telephone wires with a tendril. Peter Cushing's unshaven, mittened Death ties the stories neatly together; and the dénouement has an adequately apocalyptic flavour."

Variety noted "a usefully chilly package deal which will offer audiences several mild shudders and quite a lot of amusement. Even though occasional giggles set in, the cast, headed by experienced horror practitioners such as Peter Cushing, Michael Gough, Christopher Lee and Max Adrian, sensibly play it straight."

Chris Coffel from Bloody Disgusting called the film "an Underrated Horror Anthology", and commended the film's cinematography.

== See also ==
- The Beast with Five Fingers
- The Hand
- Tales That Witness Madness
