= A Candle in Her Room =

Book by Ruth M. Arthur

- First edition (US)
- Author: Ruth M. Arthur
- Illustrator: Margery Gill
- Cover artist: Margery Gill
- Language: English
- Genre: Young Adult Fiction
- Publisher: Atheneum Books
- Publication date: 1966
- Publication place: United States
- Media type: Print (hardcover)
- Pages: 212
- ISBN: 0575004649
- OCLC: 848418

A Candle in Her Room is a 1966 children's book written by Ruth M. Arthur, illustrated by Margery Gill and published by Atheneum Books. The book - set in Pembrokeshire, Wales - explores the effect of a bewitched doll on multiple generations of young women.

== Summary ==
A malevolent doll found in the attic of a seaside mansion affects the actions of three generations of young women, until at last one is able to break the spell and destroy it. The book explores the themes of love of family across generations, and good vs. evil.

A little girl orphaned in WWII keeps imagining herself in the house where her mother grew up. An old woman who lives in the house repeatedly envisions a little girl standing in the room with her. Eventually the old woman embarks on a journey, determined to find the child from her vision. The little girl, it turns out, is the old woman’s grand-niece, and when the two are finally united, they recognize each other from their mutual visions even though they’ve never met in the flesh.

The story is told in four parts, each by a separate narrator as the story moves through time. Part one is told by Melissa, from when the family arrives at the Old Court until she and Judith and Carew were about to become adults, in the middle of World War I. Part two is told by Dilys, Judith's daughter, who has moved back to the Old Court with Judith after Carew's death in the war. Part two ends as Dilys and her love, Bron, are about to go to his home in Poland as World War II is about to start. Part three is told by Melissa again, about a year after Part two ends while she is waiting to hear from Dilys. It ends about 13 years later. Part four is told by Nina, Dilys daughter.

== Plot ==
Melissa's parents move their family and Emmy Lee to the mansion - called Old Court - in Pembrokeshire. The mansion - formerly a courthouse - passed to Melissa's parents upon the death of Aunt Lucia. Everyone is delighted except Judith, the artist, who wants to remain in London. Briony finds the slim wooden doll with the word 'DIDO' carved down her back, and soon her behavior changes. After Judith discovers it though, it suddenly disappears. The odd behavior changes in Briony that Melissa observed when she had Dido soon went away after she 'lost' her, and Briony returned to her usual self. Judith draws farther away from the family, becoming even more moody and difficult than usual. She stay mostly in London, secretive and detached.

Melissa and Carew develop a romantic attachment, but when Carew meets Judith, and says of her 'she has the brilliance of a diamond, and no heart. She fascinates and terrifies me. She has great magnetism and I feel she might compel me to do something against my will, something devilish, something she wanted.' Melissa and Carew continued their relationship, planning to marry when they became of age. Everything changes when Melissa feels compelled to go by the sea after heavy rains, and the ground gives way. Her injuries heal, but the shock and the strange pains she has in her legs keep her paralyzed. Carew is determined to remain faithful to her, but after time passes, when he finishes his studies, Judith sweeps in and the two run off to London together to marry. Melissa, remains in Newcove with Miss Emmy as Part I concludes.

Part two is told by Dilys starting when she is six and realizes her mother doesn't love her. She lives at Old Court in Newcove, with Aunt Liss (Melissa), and Emmy, and sometimes her mother Judith is there but she acts strangely much of the time and pushes everyone away. As she grows up, she learns about what happened between her mother, Judith, and Aunt Liss; she also briefly comes in to contact with Dido and is repulsed by her. She and Aunt Liss talk of Dido one day, and Dilys learns how powerful she is. Dilys meets Bron, a Polish man staying in the area. They fall in love and Part II ends after they commit to each other, in 1938.

Part three is told from the point of view of Melissa again, and starts with a letter arriving from Dilys seven months after it was sent from Poland, in early 1940. Shortly after a friend of Bron's arrives, and lets them know that Bron (and Dilys) has joined the Polish underground resistance movement. After Judith dies of pneumonia, Melissa and Emmy Lee search everywhere for Dido in order to destroy her, but they can't find it. World War II ends, and Melissa searches endlessly for Dilys, but cannot find her. It occurs to her that perhaps Dilys and Jan had a child. Days later, Melissa has her first vision of a child in the room with her. She starts to see the child regularly, and this gives her new hope. After time she sees the child becoming older. One day during an appearance of the child, the child is actually looking at her. To keep the dog from starting, Melissa nudges the dog with her foot. Suddenly she realizes the child is Dilys daughter, and also that has some chance of movement despite the paralysis. She determined to learn to walk again, so that she could visit every orphanage in Europe if need be to find Dilys daughter.

Part four is told by twelve-year-old Nina, Dilys daughter, who has been in an orphanage for two years since her mother - Dilys - had died. Dilys had been not right in her mind after the war, she couldn't go back to Wales, so they had lived in refugee camps after Bron died. Now Aunt Liss has finally come to get her. Nina is dazed at first, walks through the Old Court again in her imagination as she has many times before from her mother's stories of it. Nina and Aunt Liss travel back to the Old Court, and establish new patterns.

Nina has her choice of rooms in the house, and chooses Judith's old room in the attic, despite the hostile presence there. Nina feels uncomfortably alienated from Aunt Liss and Miss Emmy at times because of her past, but also tougher than them because of all she had endured. In time she finds Dido, hidden deep within a series of cubby holes, with the herb Santolina/Lavender Cotton packed around her. Nina enters into a relationship with Dido, which the reader experiences for the first time.

Nina sees different expressions on Dido's face, and Nina is very aware of Dido's effect on her actions. She tries to resist, but keeps being drawn in to her power. She realizes that it was Dido that made Judith the way she was. When Dido finally threatens Melissa, Nina makes up her mind. She builds a bonfire on the sandy beach and flings Dido in to the center of it. She wins out over the evil in that doll.

== Characters ==
- Melissa Mansell, oldest of the 3 girls who move to the Old Court before WWI
- Judith Mansell, middle sister who becomes controlled by Dido
- Briony Mansell, youngest sister who grows up and moves to Canada
- Emmy Lee, maid for the Mansell family, lifelong companion to Melissa
- Dr. Mansell - father of Melissa, Judith and Briony
- Mother Mansell - Dr. Mansell's wife, mother of the 3 girls
- Aunt Lucia - Dr. Mansell's aunt who left the 'Old Court' to the Mansell family
- Young Rees Owen - local neighbor and handyman
- Old Rees Owen - Young Rees' father
- Mrs. Owen - Young Rees' mother, is able to talk to the seals and has healing ways about her
- Carew Grenville - well-off young man who falls in love with Melissa, but marries Judith
- Dilys Grenville - daughter of Carew Grenville and Judith
- Bronislav Kostarski - Polish man living near the Old Court for a year in 1937 who marries Dilys
- Miranda, Briony's daughter
- Dilly Rolska - Dilys Greenville's name in the Polish resistance
- Anya - Nina's best friend at the orphanage
- Nina Melissa Rolska | Nina Melissa Kostarska | Nina Melissa Greenville - Dilys and Bron's daughter, final owner of Dido
- David Lewis - new neighbor of the Grenville's

== Malevolent Doll - Dido ==
Dido is described in A Candle in Her Room as being very old, 'polished and smooth as a chestnut with the caresses of many hands,' carved out of a very hard wood like holly wood. Her hair and features were carved in great detail, her expression was 'a curious mixture - wise, sly, enigmatic.' When Dido was discovered by Briony, at the bottom of an old leather trunk in the Old Loft of the Old Court, she was dressed in a simple layer. During Judith's relationship with her, she created an extensive wardrobe for her of velvet dresses and beautifully sewn lace undergarments. An artist herself, Judith first drew Dido and then later painted her constantly. In Judith's paintings, Dido was 'in rich clothes of brilliant colors, her black hair piled high on her proud head. The face was arresting, imperious, disdainful, and wicked... It was a fascinating face, but malevolent.' Judith became famous for those paintings.

Rose Michael says of the book and Arthur's others, "I never left them open—as though the doll Dido might escape from the pages the same way she’d evaded every other attempt to contain her. Inspiring, I’ve just realised, the first short story I published as a teenager, giving a new meaning to its ‘Exorcism’ title."

The doll featured in this novel is ancient and powerful. In Ellen Datlow's article on 'The Most Disturbing Dolls in Literature, this description of Dido by Gemma Files is first in the list. 'Dido, a wooden doll held together with pegs - slim, hard, and totemically simple, her name incised along her spine.. is obviously a witch's fetish... Her purpose is to sow division, to set blood against blood, to create suffering. She is very definitely an instrument of revenge, an object through which some ceaseless fount of malice is able to survive the grave.' Whoever 'possesses' Dido will see expressions in her face, will perceive her as alive, will be compelled to draw her and cloth her. And when she disobeys Dido, she will be punished with horrible nightmares, sleepwalking, and other compulsions. Dido exerts such power over her owner that her personality changes and her other relationships are challenged.

== Publication history ==
First published in 1966 by Atheneum Books in the U.S., and by McClelland & Stewart in Canada, it has had several reprints but is currently out-of-print. It has an alternate title of The Witch Doll.

1966 - London - Gollancz - Juvenile Audience

1966 - New York - Atheneum

1966 - New York - Atheneum - Juvenile Audience

1968 - London - Gollancz

1970 - London - May Fair Books

1972 - London - G. B. Gollancz

1972 - London - G. B. Gollancz

1980 - Sevenoaks - Hodder & Stoughton - Juvenile Audience

1980 - Sevenoaks - Knight Books - Juvenile Audience

== Reception ==
Kirkus Reviews lauded the author's ability to "convey a sense of black magic", and stated that the novel's "most compelling moments occur when the characters become aware of the malignant spread of evil", but considered the character of Melissa to be "disappointingly bland." A Candle in Her Room is reported as memorably frightening. In the New Yorker, Cynthia Zarin opens a book review by writing, "Two books have haunted me since childhood... For years, I forgot I had read these books (A Candle and Her Room, and We Have Always Lived in the Castle by Shirley Jackson), as one might suppress a traumatic event, but later, when I happened on them again, one after the other, I realized that here, like sugar laced with rat poison, was the source of the feeling of unease, a ripple below the skin, that rarely deserts me". Lucy Ellmann lists the novel as one of her favorite childhood books, "This was my first taste of a multiple-voice narrative, and I thought it incredibly sophisticated. Moving, too."
