= A Couple of Beauties =

1972 British film by Francis Searle

- Directed by: Francis Searle
- Screenplay by: Bernie Friedburg and Francis Searle
- Produced by: Francis Searle
- Starring: Bunny Lewis; Pat Coombs; James Beck; Tim Barrett
- Cinematography: Ken Talbot
- Edited by: Peter Mayhew
- Music by: Peter Jeffries
- Production company: Bayford Films
- Release date: 1972
- Running time: 29 minutes
- Country: United Kingdom
- Language: English

A Couple of Beauties is a 1972 British comedy-thriller short film directed by Francis Searle and starring Manchester drag queen Bunny Lewis, Pat Coombs, James Beck and Tim Barrett. It was written by Bernie Friedburg and Searle, and produced by Searle's company Bayford Films.

A Couple of Beauties is the last in a series of 30-minute films directed by Searle in the "Screen Miniatures" series, which he made between 1966 and 1972. Others in the series are Miss MacTaggart Won’t Lie Down (1966), The Pale Faced Girl (1968), Talk of the Devil (1968), Gold Is Where You Find It (1968), It All Goes to Show (1969) and A Hole Lot of Trouble (1971).

== Plot ==
Bernie Lewisham is a barman in a London nightclub. After witnessing the gangland murder of his boss he flees for his safety up north, to Manchester. There, his agent Tim Baxter suggests he disguise himself as a woman. Bernie becomes female impersonator Bunny Lewis and performs at local venues. The baddies trail him to Manchester, are nabbed by the police, and Bernie is safe.

== Cast ==
- Bunny Lewis as Bernie Lewisham / himself
- Tim Barrett as Tim Baxter
- James Beck as Sidney
- Pat Coombs as Sidney's wife Madge
- Bernard Manning as himself
- Colin Crompton as himself
- John Scarborough as gangster

== Production ==
The film was shot on location in Manchester, in the city-centre Denos Club, the Mersey Hotel, and the Everley Hotel.

It includes the songs "It's Raining" and "Billy Boy" written by Kenny Lynch and Peter Jeffries.

== Reception ==
The British Film Institute wrote that the film had "[has] left us with a valuable snapshot of Mancunian nightlife in the early 1970s. ... An innuendo-laden star vehicle for Manchester-based female impersonator Bunny Lewis, this fascinatingly slapdash quickie got lost among a raft of bigger-budget drag features like Dick Emery’s Ooh... You Are Awful (1972). Lewis plays nightclub barman Bernie Lewisham ... he's no actor, but once he drags up to ‘hide’ from the mob he’s on safer – and very entertaining – ground."

David McGillivray wrote: "The film is only one of a few that records the popularity of drag acts in heterosexual pubs and clubs before the decriminalisation of homosexuality. The female impersonators almost invariably pretended to be straight, and Bunny Lewis finds it exciting when he is expected to share a bed with a dolly bird."

== Home media ==
A Couple of Beauties was included as a special feature on the DVD release of Girl Stroke Boy (1973) (Powerhouse Films, 2022).
