= Portrait of Margarita =

1968 children's book by Ruth M. Arthur

- First edition
- Author: Ruth M. Arthur
- Illustrator: Margery Gill
- Cover artist: Margery Gill
- Language: English
- Genre: Young Adult Fiction
- Publisher: Atheneum Books
- Publication date: 1968
- Publication place: United States
- Media type: Print (hardcover)
- Pages: 185
- ISBN: 0689300131

Portrait of Margarita is a 1968 children's book written by Ruth M. Arthur, illustrated by Margery Gill and published by Atheneum Books. The book - set in Oxfordshire and Lake Garda - tells the story of a young woman who loses her parents in a tragic accident, and in rebuilding her life finds resolution for her racial identity.

== Summary ==
Set in the current day, this novel is about Margarita's struggles with her mixed-race background after her parents die in a plane accident. Soon after her sixteenth birthday, Margarita's coming-of-age story includes new bonds with family, learning about herself, and managing challenges.

Her mother's cousin Francis - who she has never met - is assigned custody of her. As gets to know that part of her family and the people in his community - including a menacing elderly woman and a young girl with autism - she begins to deal with her grief, starts to love and trust again, and accepts herself.

== Plot ==
Part I

After her parents' death, Margarita becomes the ward of her Mom's Cousin Francis, and moves in with him during boarding school holidays. Margarita settles into Swithins Mill and the community of Hockton, Oxfordshire, and they develop a positive bond. Margarita gets along with everyone at Hockton, except for a small number of people who react with coldness and hostility due to her foreign appearance and her status as an outsider. She feels concern about Miss Laura, but she tries to put that aside as Francis is close to her. Margarita feelings for Cousin Francis seem like romantic love to her, but she keeps that secret from everyone. Toward the end of her first visit, she meets that painting lot, the Giles family that has recently moved in to the area.

Part II

On returning to Swithins Mill for the Spring holidays, Margarita has more intense interactions with Miss Laura, who clearly wants her to stop taking up Cousin Francis time. She sees the Ghost Dog and is told that is a portent of danger.

One her return visit to the Giles household, she also first witnesses Stella having a bout of screaming, and learns about her autism. Giles and Martha have the idea of his painting Margarita, so it is arranged for Margarita to come in every day and sit for him. Between sessions of sitting for Giles, Margarita enjoys playing with Lucy, and also gaining Stella's trust. She sings sometimes, and later on Stella starts to sing as well, a major breakthrough. Margarita chooses to ignore increasing anonymous harassment. Meanwhile, Cousin Francis and Margarita continue to become close. After Giles finishes the portrait of her, it is vandalized the very next day. Initially the suspicion rests of Stella.

When Margarita finds one of Miss Laura's ancient hairpins near the destroyed portrait, she realizes it was Miss Laura who destroyed it. She goes to her house to give it back, and catches Miss Laura in the act of writing one of the menacing notes. As Miss Laura's hostility towards her escalates, her life is saved by the Ghost Dog.Cousin Francis commissions Giles to recreate the painting of Margarita.

Part III

In July of that same year, Cousin Francis brings Margarita to his house - Casa della Rocca - on Lake Garda, Italy. Cousin Francis shows Margarita the portrait he commissioned Giles' to paint. The beautiful painting will be exhibited and hopefully will launch Giles career. Margarita and Cousin Francis spend several wonderful weeks there, boating on the water, touring the Dolomites and visiting the local sights. One day by the water she meets Pietro, a young boy about her age. Pietro speaks Italian to her, expecting her to understand based on her appearance. They hit it off, and they part with plans to meet the next day. When she returns home, she learns from Rosa that he is her nephew, and she speaks very fondly of him. The next day after they swim, Pietro gives her a nickname 'Nutmeg,' because of her name and her coloring. Margarita bursts in to tears, as that was her father's pet name for her. For the first time, she experiences fully her grief at losing her father. She tells Pietro all about it, and their relationship strengthens.

Soon after, she learns about Francis involvement in Lake Garda during the war, working with Giorgio, Giovanni and Rosa; Francis buying a cottage in the area after the war, and Carolyn joining him. She learned that Pietro was Francis' nephew. After a near-fatal boating accident, Margarita realizes her intense feelings are for Pietro, who she loves as a partner. As he recuperates, they share their feelings and start to plan their future for Margarita that includes working with autistic children. Finally, at the last possible moment, she tells him about her coloring - her Jamaican background. He accepts and celebrates her West Indies heritage, and suggests that they visit there some time so she can embrace that part of herself. She feels able to see clearly, without being impacted, "the humiliations I had suffered to my pride among white people, the condescension of the stupid, the uncomfortable silences of the narrow-minded, the petty innuendos and hints of Miss Laura." She looks forward to going to Jamaica to meet and learn to love her mother's people.

== Major characters ==
Margarita Somerville, the protagonist of the story, is a multi-ethnic young women of 16 who becomes an orphan, and experiences a year of change and growth. She has lived in multiple places growing up and hasn't formed long-term friendships. Her olive-colored skin, dark eyes, and jet black hair has made her 'foreign' in the eyes of many people around her, and she has been aware of her mother's hostility to her as well.

Margarita's Father is a doctor (and formerly a pilot) with the R.A.F. Margarita and her father were very close.

Margarita's Mother is both white and black, and has white-skin privilege because of her appearance. Her mother was black and Jamaican while her father was white. Growing up in the West Indies, she had left for England as soon as she was old enough and rejected her mixed-race background. Margarita's darker coloring upset her mother, who was bitter and resentful and took it out on Margarita.

Margarita's Maternal Grandmother was a black Jamaican woman, who married a white man and had Margarita's mother. She was often in conflict with her daughter. Once her daughter left for England, they didn't have any contact.

Francis Rossington is Margarita's mother's cousin, who become her guardian. During World War II, Francis (then known as Il Capitano) had been in Italy working with the partisans, including near Lake Garda. After the war he bought a cottage in the area and continued to spend time there. His primary residence is Swithins Mill - built in 1660 as a working mill - converted to a home 100 years earlier, located in the town of Hockton, Oxfordshire. He became a solicitor, currently travels a great deal for work, raises orchids, and is working on a book about his wartime experiences.

Carolyn Rossington is Francis twin sister, who died 17 years earlier. Bullied and tormented by Miss Laura her whole life, she accepted Francis invitation to join him in Lake Garda after the war. She fell in love with a local doctor and they became engaged, but he died in a car crash. Pregnant, Carolyn tried to drown herself, but was rescued by Giorgio, who later married her and raised Pietro as his own son when Carolyn died a few years later. Carolyn had insisted that Pietro not know that Il Capitano was his uncle until her turned 18, to ensure his safety from Miss Laura.

Miss Laura Frisk became the nurse to Cousin Francis and his twin sister Cynthia when she was a young woman. After they aged out of her care, she was companion to Mrs. Rossington until her death four years earlier. At that time, Francis found her a cottage close to his home in Hockton. Miss Laura is extremely possessive of Cousin Francis' attention and time. For all his life, Francis had been her favorite, she had never liked or been kind to his twin sister Carolyn. Her behavior in the present day swings wildly between gracious pleasantries and malicious hostility towards Margarita, when they are alone.

Stella Willard is a four-year-old sister of Lucy, diagnosed with autism a year earlier. Stella's behaviors include not speaking, rejecting affection, not understanding her parents' intentions or actions towards her, rejecting new things and people, rhythmic movement, and destructive physical behavior. Stella has become the care focus of the household. She slowly becomes comfortable with Margarita's presence, especially her singing.

Pietro Fanetti Margarita's love interest. He is Cynthia's son and Francis nephew, living in Lake Garda, being raised by Rosa's brother.

== Minor characters ==
- Jacob Hawthorne, household employee of Cousin Francis.
- Giles Willard, painter, Stella's father, paints the namesake portrait of her.
- Martha Willard, ballet choreographer, gave up her work to take care of Stella full-time.
- Trudie Hawthorne, Jacob's wife, also employed by Cousin Francis.
- Vicar, his wife, four children, neighboring family of Cousin Francis.
- Lucy Willard, five-year-old favorite neighbor/friend of Margarita.
- Rosa - Signora Castelli - owner of Lake Garda cafe, who households for Il Capitano when he's in town.
- Giovanni Castelli - Partisan during the war who was shot by the Germans. Rosa's husband.
- Giorgio Fanetti, Rosa's brother, Carolyn's husband, Pietro's adopted father.
- Mrs. Rossington, Cousin Francis' mother, had wanted twin girls, used to dress both Francis and Cynthia as girls when they were young.
- Mr. Rossington, Counsin Fransic' father - died fighting in India when Francis was a boy.
- Swithins Mill original owners' daughter - died from rising mill waters one hundred years prior.
- Ghost dog - an apparition that haunts Swithins Mill. It had belonged to the girl who died, and was linked in the current day with bad things happening.

== Autism ==
As a sub-plot, the novel includes a four-year-old girl who is severely autistic, and includes descriptions of autistic behavior. Even in the late 1970s, most people had never heard the term 'autism' yet.

== Reception ==
Taught at a girls’ secondary school in Kent as part of English in the late 1970s, Portrait of Margarita was one of the sets of class novels in the stock cupboard. Susan Elkin notes, "it's a rather weak story about an orphaned teenager who goes to live with her dishy but enigmatic guardian," concluding that the sub-plot about autism was the more interesting part. The Fresno Bee reports this novel as having an interesting story, one that "will be remembered". Sheila Ray comments that the romantic nature of this novel is somewhat offset by the contemporary problems introduced: racial identity, and autism. It is firmly anchored in its geographical setting - Oxfordshire - as well as its class setting of affluence, also important is the ambience that welcomes the supernatural.
