= Gaolbreak =

1962 British film by Francis Searle

- Directed by: Francis Searle
- Written by: A.R. Rawlinson
- Produced by: Ronald Liles; John I. Phillips; Francis Searle
- Starring: Peter Reynolds; Avice Landone; Carol White
- Cinematography: Ken Hodges
- Edited by: Jim Connock
- Music by: Johnny Gregory
- Production company: Butcher's Film Service
- Distributed by: Butcher's Film Distributors
- Release date: April 1962
- Running time: 61 minutes
- Country: United Kingdom
- Language: English

Gaolbreak is a 1962 British second feature crime film directed by Francis Searle and starring Peter Reynolds, Avice Landone and Carol White. It was written by A.R. Rawlinson. The film was released as a supporting feature to Tiara Tahiti (1962).

== Plot ==
A family of thieves plan a jewellery store robbery. One of them is the safecracking expert, and when he is arrested and jailed, they spring him from prison so he can take part in the job.

== Cast ==
- Peter Reynolds as Eddie Wallis
- Avice Landone as Mrs. Wallis
- David Kernan as Len Rogerson
- Carol White as Carol Marshall
- John Blythe as Slim
- David Gregory as Ron Wallis
- Robert Desmond as Page
- Stewart Guidotti as John
- Geoffrey Hibbert as Dr. Cambus
- Robert Fyfe as Wally
- Carl Bernard as Inspector Brand
- Katharine Page as Mrs. Harris
- Sidney Vivian as Mr. Marshall
- Marianne Stone as Mrs. Marshall
- Ivor Dean as Barrington
- André Mikhelson as Martinetti
- Middleton Woods as Jonah
- Reginald Hearne as auctioneer
- Edward Ogden as Det. Sgt. Johnson
- Frank Hawkins as prison officer
- Neil Wilson as beat PC
- Jack Taylor as uniformed policeman
- John H. Watson as 2nd uniformed policeman
- Michael Beint as 2nd prison officer
- Laurie Leigh as Shirley
- Angela Ramsden as Hazel

== Production ==
The film was made by Butcher's Film Service, and shot at Twickenham Studios in West London, and on location. The film's sets were designed by the art director Duncan Sutherland.

== Critical reception ==
Monthly Film Bulletin said "Running true to the traditional formula of British crime-story second features, this is nevertheless well cast and crisply put over. Most of the characters are effectively drawn but the prison escape looks far too easy."

Steve Chibnall wrote in British Crime Cinema: "The presence of a young Carol White ... cannot compensate for the film's flat and sluggish direction, a script that would be embarrassingly simplistic in a children's matinee and two of the least-threatening villains in screen history (a newsagent and his mum)."

The Radio Times Guide to Films gave the film 1/5 stars, writing: "This typically down-at-heel crime story from low-budget specialists Butcher's is spiced up by a subplot about an unwanted pregnancy. It features an early performance by Carol White, who found fame in Ken Loach's television play Cathy Come Home [1966] and his feature Poor Cow [1967]. Sadly, this tale has barely enough plot to make a TV episode, let alone keep a cinema audience happy, and seems stretched even at its one-hour running."
