= Michael Sharvell-Martin =

British actor (1944–2010)

- Born: Michael Ernest Martin; 2 February 1944; Herne Bay, Kent, England, UK
- Died: 28 October 2010 (aged 66); Wincanton, Somerset, England, UK
- Occupation: Actor
- Spouse(s): Linda Hind (1967–2010; his death); 2 children

Michael Sharvell-Martin (2 February 1944 – 28 October 2010) was a British television and stage actor. He was a character actor, guest-starring in dramas and comedies during the 1970s and 1980s.

== Early life ==
Sharvell-Martin was born Michael Ernest Martin in Herne Bay, Kent, and trained in stage management at the Bristol Old Vic Theatre School. His acting debut was in 1965 at the Everyman Theatre, Cheltenham. He adopted the stage name Michael Sharvell-Martin because there was already an actor called Michael Martin.

== Career ==
Sharvell-Martin was mainly a supporting cast actor and appeared in the television series Dave Allen at Large. He also had a recurring role as Trevor Botting in the television situation comedy No Place Like Home. During his career he made guest appearances in The Benny Hill Show, Dad's Army, Terry and June, Yes Minister and Murder Most Horrid. He also appeared in two episodes of the BBC's department store sitcom Are You Being Served? in the 1980s.

His stage appearances included several West End comedy farces and accomplished Pantomime-Dame roles, for example at the Theatres Royal in Windsor and Lincoln.

== Selected filmography ==
- Quest for Love (1971) – says "Hello Trafford" (uncredited)
- A Hole Lot of Trouble (1971) – newly-wed husband
- That's Your Funeral (1972) – 1st policeman
- Ooh... You Are Awful (1972) – Jackson (uncredited)
- Go for a Take (1972) – Leopard Man director
- Rentadick (1972) – removal man
- Kadoyng (1972) – Pander – Willoughby
- The Love Ban (1973) – bra factory designer
- Love Thy Neighbour (1973) – police constable
- The Best of Benny Hill (1974) – Lower Tidmarsh hospital doctor / Rev. Peter Wilby / various
- Frightmare (1974) – barman
- Not Now, Comrade (1976) – 2nd Russian official
- No Place Like Home (1983–1987) – Trevor Botting

== Personal life ==
Sharvell-Martin married Linda Hind in 1967 and the couple had two daughters.

He was first president of the Irving Society, founded to commemorate Sir Henry Irving.

In the early part of 2010 he was diagnosed with cancer of the oesophagus and died on 28 October 2010 at Wincanton, Somerset.
