= The Marked One =

1963 British film by Francis Searle

- Directed by: Francis Searle
- Written by: Paul Erickson
- Produced by: Tom Blakeley
- Starring: William Lucas; Zena Walker; Patrick Jordan
- Cinematography: Frank Kingston
- Edited by: Jim Connock
- Music by: Bernie Fenton; Frank Patten
- Production company: Planet Film Productions
- Distributed by: Planet Film Distributors (UK)
- Release date: 1963
- Running time: 65 minutes
- Country: United Kingdom
- Language: English

The Marked One is a 1963 British second feature crime film directed by Francis Searle and starring William Lucas, Zena Walker and Patrick Jordan. It was written by Paul Erickson. An ex-con's daughter is kidnapped by a blackmailer.

== Plot summary ==
Truck driver Don Mason is an ex-con who served time for involvement in a forgery racket, and is now trying to go straight. A blackmailer demands the plates used in the forgery, threatening Mason's wife and kidnapping their child.

== Cast ==
- William Lucas as Don Mason
- Zena Walker as Kay Mason
- Patrick Jordan as Inspector Mayne
- Laurie Leigh as Maisie
- David Gregory as Ed Jones
- Arthur Lovegrove as Benson
- Marianne Stone as Mrs Benson
- Kim Tracy as Wanda
- Edward Ogden as Nevil Stone
- Frederick Peisley as Mossie
- Dorothy Gordon as Ruby
- Frank Sieman as Lacey
- Brian Nissen as Charles Warren
- Lynn Pinkney as Sally
- Richard McNeff as Inspector Rogers

== Production ==
The film was made at MGM Studios, Borehamwood.

== Critical reception ==
Monthly Film Bulletin said, "Spot-the-blackmailer crime thriller, quite neatly built but sleazy and slackly motivated (why is everyone so crassly opposed to going to the police?). The direction is nondescript; William Lucas, Zena Walker and Brian Nissen act well despite stereotyped roles."

Kine Weekly wrote: "A straightforward story of skulduggery has been directed in a straightforward way, and the secret of who is the master villain is reasonably well kept. The pace, so essential in this type of tale is, however, uneven. It does, however, work up to a rousing climax of a chase and fight and there are some good incidental scraps. William Lucas does an adequate job with the tough, but essentially good-hearted hero, Don, and a charming touch of homely romance is provided by Zena Walker, as his wife. A competent supporting cast does all that is required of it."
