= Cynthia Zarin =

American journalist

- Born: 1959 (age 66–67)
- Education: Harvard University; Columbia University (MFA)
- Occupations: Poet; journalist
- Spouses: Michael Seccareccia (m. 1988, divorced) Joseph Goddu (m. 1997, divorced)

Cynthia Zarin (born 1959) is an American poet and journalist.

== Life ==
She graduated from Harvard University magna cum laude, and Columbia University with an M.F.A.

She teaches at Yale University. She has written for the New York Times, Architectural Digest, and is a contributing editor for Gourmet, and staff writer at the New Yorker, where she writes frequently about books and theatre. Other works include libretti for two ballets for the New York-based company BalletCollective, directed by Troy Schumacher, "The Impulse Wants Company" and "Dear and Blackbirds. Her poems have appeared in The Paris Review, Poetry, Grand Street, The Nation, and are widely anthologized.

She married Michael Seccareccia on January 24, 1988, but later divorced. She married Joseph Goddu on December 6, 1997, but later divorced.

== Awards ==
- National Endowment for the Arts fellowship in poetry
- Artist in residence at St. John the Divine.
- Peter I. Lavan Award
- New York Women's Press Award for Writing on the Arts
- Ingram Merrill Foundation Award for Poetry
- Los Angeles Times Book Prize (2002)
- Guggenheim Fellowship (2011)

== Bibliography ==
=== Poetry ===
Collections

- New Age and other poems. Columbia University. 1984.
- The swordfish tooth : poems. New York: Knopf. 1989.
- Fire Lyric. Knopf. 1993. ISBN 978-0-679-42003-3.
- The Watercourse. Alfred A. Knopf. 2002. ISBN 978-0-375-41366-7.
- The Ada Poems, Alfred A Knopf 2010. ISBN 978-0307272478
- Orbit, Alfred A. Knopf 2017. ISBN 978-0451494726

List of poems

- "Of Lincoln". Poetry Foundation. Archived from the original on 2008-11-25.
- "The Astronomical Hen". Poetry Foundation. Archived from the original on 2008-11-28.
- "Skating in Harlem, Christmas Day". poets.org. Archived from the original on 2009-04-04.

Title	Year	First published	Reprinted/collected
April	2020	Zarin, Cynthia (December 21, 2020). "April". The New Yorker. 96 (41): 62–63.	

Anthologies

- Norton Anthology of Poetry ISBN 978-0393969245

=== Non-fiction ===
- Robert Atwan, Louis Menand, ed. (2004). "An Enlarged Heart". The Best American Essays 2004. Houghton Mifflin. ISBN 978-0-618-35706-2.
- Holly Hughes, ed. (2005). "The Big Cheese". Best Food Writing 2005. Da Capo Press. ISBN 978-1-56924-345-9.
- "Seeing Things: The art of Olafur Eliasson". The New Yorker. November 13, 2006.
- "After Hamlet: A Shakespearian Maverick Comes to Broadway" The New Yorker, May 2008.
- "Not Nice: Maurice Sendak and The Perils of Childhood" The New Yorker, April 2006.
- "Teen Queen: Looking For Lady Jane" The New Yorker, October, 2007.
- An Enlarged Heart, A Personal History, Alfred A. Knopf 2013.
- Two Cities. New York: David Zwirner Books. 2020.

=== Children's books ===
- Rose and Sebastian. Illustrator Sarah Durham. Houghton Mifflin. 1997. ISBN 978-0-395-75920-2.
- What Do You See when You Shut Your Eyes?. Illustrator Sarah Durham. Houghton Mifflin. 1998. ISBN 978-0-395-76507-4.
- Wallace Hoskins, the Boy who Grew Down: The Boy Who Grew Down. Illustrator Martin Matje. DK Ink. 1999. ISBN 978-0-7894-2523-2.
- Albert, the Dog Who Liked to Ride in Taxis. Illustrator Pierre Pratt. Simon & Schuster Children's Publishing. January 1, 2004. ISBN 978-0-689-84762-2.
- Saints Among the Animals. Illustrator Leonid Gore. Simon & Schuster Children's Publishing. 2006. ISBN 978-0-689-85031-8.
