= Patrick Jordan =

British actor (1923–2020)

- Born: Albert Patrick Jordan; 10 October 1923; Harrow, Middlesex, England
- Died: 10 January 2020 (aged 96); Alpheton, Suffolk, England
- Occupation: Actor
- Years active: 1953–1995
- Spouse: Margery Gill (m. 1946; died 2008)
- Children: 2

Albert Patrick Jordan (10 October 1923 – 10 January 2020) was a British stage, film and television actor.

== Biography ==
He was born and raised in Harrow, Middlesex, the son of Margaret, a cook, and Albert Jordan, a regimental sergeant major. An accident while playing bows and arrows with his two brothers left him with a distinctive scar on his right cheek. He made his stage debut in a 1946 Old Vic production of Richard II at the New Theatre, which was directed by Ralph Richardson and featured Harry Andrews and Alec Guinness. With Old Vic he went on to perform in other Shakespearean plays, including Coriolanus and The Taming of the Shrew, in the last of which also appeared Renée Asherson. Jordan remained friends with Asherson and Guinness.

Jordan's screen roles included several war films, including The Battle of the River Plate (1956), The Longest Day (1962), The Heroes of Telemark (1965), Play Dirty (1969), and Too Late the Hero (1970). He is perhaps best remembered for his uncredited speaking role as Imperial Officer Cass, an aide to Grand Moff Tarkin (Peter Cushing), in Star Wars (1977), a role secured for him by Guinness, who played Obi-Wan Kenobi. Jordan was offered the choice of either a guaranteed fee for his role, or a small share of the film's royalties. As he was dubious about the film's prospects, he opted for the former, a decision which he later regretted in light of the film's immense success. Jordan's television appearances included Randall and Hopkirk (Deceased), (A Disturbing Case, episode); Minder; Angels; Terry and June; Shine on Harvey Moon; Poirot; Crossroads; and The Bill. He retired in 1995.

== Personal life ==
Jordan was married to illustrator Margery Gill from 1946 until her death in 2008. They had two daughters, Tessa and Ros (died 1996). From 1969, he and his wife lived in Alpheton, Suffolk, where he died on 10 January 2020, at the age of 96. He was survived by his elder daughter, four grandchildren and nine great-grandchildren.

== Selected filmography ==
- Stryker of the Yard (1953)
- Face the Music (1954) – Policeman #1 (uncredited)
- River Beat (1954) – Bert Fisher
- Eight O'Clock Walk (1954) - Prison Warden (uncredited)
- The Diamond (1954) – First Fox & Hounds Detective (uncredited)
- The Embezzler (1954) – Police Sergeant (uncredited)
- Companions in Crime (1954)
- Stock Car (1955) – Jack
- The Gilded Cage (1955) – Sergeant Miller
- The Flaw (1955) – Oliveri's Friend at the Club
- No Smoking (1955) – Reporter
- It's a Great Day (1955) – Policeman
- Cloak Without Dagger (1956) – Captain Willis
- The Battle of the River Plate (1956) – Signalman, Aft-Conning, HMS Exeter (uncredited)
- The Secret Place (1957) – Constable (uncredited)
- The Man Upstairs (1958) – Injured Sergeant
- The Angry Hills (1959) – Bluey
- The Giant Behemoth (1959) – Photo Lab Aide (uncredited)
- Sink the Bismarck! (1960) – Agent in Norway (uncredited)
- The League of Gentlemen (1960) – Sergeant (uncredited)
- Man Detained (1961) – Brand
- Emergency (1962) – Jimmy Regan
- Rag Doll (1961) – Wills
- The Frightened City (1961) – Frankie Farmer
- The Longest Day (1962) – As British Soldier, Lt. Richard Todd speaking with Maj. John Howard (uncredited)
- The Amorous Prawn (1962) – Sergeant at Guard
- In Search of the Castaways (1962) – Ayerton Hijacker Two (uncredited)
- Dilemma (1962) – Inspector Murray
- The Marked One (1963) – Inspector Mayne
- The Informers (1963) – 1st Inspector (uncredited)
- The Victors (1963) – Tank Sergeant
- Delayed Flight (1964) – Carter
- A Place to Go (1964) – Police officer (uncredited)
- Joey Boy (1965) – Real Military Policeman (uncredited)
- Bunny Lake Is Missing (1965) – Policeman
- The Heroes of Telemark (1965) – Henrik
- Where the Bullets Fly (1966) – Russian
- You Only Live Twice (1967) – Hong Kong Policeman #1 (uncredited)
- Gold Is Where You Find It (1968) – Insp. O'Regan
- Play Dirty (1969) – Maj. Alan Watkins
- The Last Escape (1970) – Maj. Griggs (shot in 1968)
- Too Late the Hero (1970) – Sergeant Major
- Perfect Friday (1970) – Bank Guard
- Man of Violence (1971) – Mentobar Captain
- Assault (1971) – Sgt. Milton
- The Salzburg Connection (1972) – Richard Bryant
- Paganini Strikes Again (1973) – Jones
- The Slipper and the Rose: The Story of Cinderella (1976) – Prince's Guard
- The Pink Panther Strikes Again (1976) – Detective
- Star Wars (1977) – Imperial Officer Siward Cass (uncredited)
- Lifeforce (1985) – Communications Officer (voice, uncredited)
