= Laurie Leigh =

English actress (1932–2021)

- Born: Eleanor Moss; 16 September 1932
- Died: 29 January 2021 (aged 88)
- Occupation: Actress
- Years active: 1953–1969
- Spouse: Woolf Leibovitch (m. 1952)
- Children: 1

Laurie Leigh (16 September 1932 - 29 January 2021) was an English actress who appeared in British television and film.

When the first James Bond movie, Dr. No (1962), was being planned, Leigh was working for Harry Saltzman and Cubby Broccoli. Salzman's desk was filled with pictures of handsome men. She spotted Sean Connery, with whom she had appeared in the 1961 television production Anna Karenina. Harry Saltzman asked her view of him. She rated his positively.

Leigh was Bob Hope's personal assistant. She with her son David run an antique glass shop.

== Personal life ==
She was married to the clock restorer Woolf Leigh, who died in 1992. David, her son, is an instrument restorer and classical musician.

== Selected filmography ==
Year	Title	Role	Notes
1961	Anna Karenina	Annushka	TV movie
1962	Emergency	Second nurse	
1962	Gaolbreak	Shirley	
1962	Dead Man's Evidence	Pat	
1963	Paranoiac	Woman	Uncredited
1963	The Marked One	Maisie	
1965	Dr. Terror's House of Horrors	Nurse	
1966	Miss MacTaggart Won't Lie Down	Mother	short
1969	Can Heironymus Merkin Ever Forget Mercy Humppe and Find True Happiness?	Toothpaste Mother	Uncredited
