= Tim Barrett (actor) =

English actor (1929–1990)

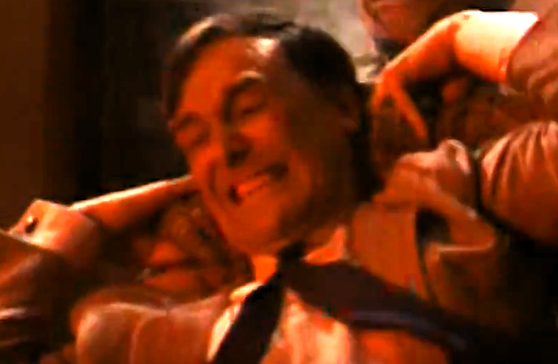
- Barrett in The Mummy's Shroud (1967)
- Born: Arthur Edward Barrett; 31 May 1929; London, England
- Died: 20 August 1990 (aged 61); Belvedere, London, England
- Occupation: Actor
- Years active: 1959–1989

Tim Barrett (31 May 1929 – 20 August 1990) was an English actor best remembered for playing Malcolm Harris, Terry Medford's boss, in several series of the classic British sitcom Terry and June.

== Career ==
Barrett took the role of Malcolm Harris in Terry and June after the original actor Terence Alexander became unavailable to return for production to begin on the Christmas special, for he had just begun playing Charlie Hungerford in Bergerac. He played Mr Campbell-Lewiston in The Fall and Rise of Reginald Perrin, episode 4 "The Bizarre Dinner Party".

Barrett played Harris from the 1980 Christmas special to the seventh series of the show, transmitted in late 1983; he was replaced in the eighth series by John Quayle. Four years after leaving Terry and June, Barrett returned, this time playing a different character called Mr Basingstoke in the episode of the final series titled "They Also Serve".

He also appeared alongside Quayle in two episodes of Farrington of the F.O. (1986) playing the harassed P. J. Parker. He also appeared in episodes of Are You Being Served?, Dad's Army, Love Thy Neighbour, The Prince of Denmark, To the Manor Born and George and Mildred.

Although best remembered for his TV work, Barrett also appeared in films, including The Psychopath (1966), Where the Bullets Fly (1966), The Deadly Bees (1966), The Mummy's Shroud (1967), A Couple of Beauties (1972), White Cargo (1973), The Slipper and the Rose (1976) and Bloodbath at the House of Death (1983).

The drama War and Remembrance (1988), in which he played Sir Trafford Leigh-Mallory, was his last acting job. He died on 20 August 1990, aged 61.
