= Time slip =

Plot device in fiction where a character changes time periods

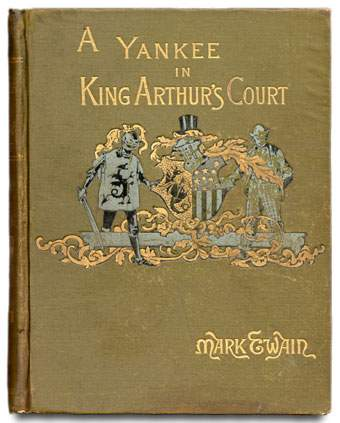
A time slip classic

A time slip is a plot device in fantasy and science fiction in which a person, or group of people, seem to accidentally travel through time by unknown means, or by a means unknown to the character(s).

Time slip is one of the main plot devices of time travel stories, another being a time machine. The difference is that in time slip stories, the protagonist typically has no control and no understanding of the process (which is often never explained at all). They are either left marooned in a past or future time and must make the best of it, or are eventually returned by a process as unpredictable and uncontrolled as the journey out. An advantage of time slip is that the author may proceed directly to the adventure without much explanation.

The idea of a time slip was used in 19th century fantasy, an early example being Washington Irving's 1819 Rip Van Winkle, where the mechanism of time travel is an extraordinarily long sleep. Time-slip stories were popularized at the end of the century by Mark Twain's 1889 historical novel A Connecticut Yankee in King Arthur's Court, which had considerable influence on later writers.

Paleontologist George Gaylord Simpson wrote a novella, published posthumously, The Dechronization of Sam Magruder, about a scientist who experiences a time slip from 2162 back into the Cretaceous Period. In this case, the time slip is accidental, but the protagonist understands the mechanism, which came about due to his experiments into the quantum nature of time.

Timeslip is also the name of a cult British TV series. In this series, two children discover a phenomenon they call the time barrier, which is situated beside a disused military base. It somehow enables their minds, but not their bodies, to travel to the past or the future. While there, they can't be physically harmed or killed. They travel from 1970 to the base while operational in 1940, followed by the Antarctic in 1990, as well as the 1960s, and another future where Britain is a hot jungle.

The plot device is also popular in children's literature.

== See also ==
- Accidental travel
- Time travel in fiction
- Time loop
