= Margery Gill =

British illustrator (1925–2008)

Margery Jean Gill
- Born: 5 April 1925; Coatbridge, North Lanarkshire, Scotland
- Died: 31 October 2008 (aged 83)
- Education: Harrow School of Art; Royal College of Art
- Known for: Children's book illustration
- Notable work: Margaret Kornitzer, Mr Fairweather and his Family, The Bodley Head, 1960; Frances Hodgson Burnett, A Little Princess, Puffin Books, 1961; Susan Cooper, Over Sea, Under Stone, Jonathan Cape, 1965; Susan Cooper, Dawn of Fear, Chatto & Windus, 1972
- Spouse: Patrick Jordan (m. 1946)
- Children: 2

Cover illustration of Frances Hodgson Burnetts' A Little Princess, Puffin Books, 1961

Margery Jean Gill (5 April 1925 – 31 October 2008) was a British illustrator of children's books.

== Early life ==
Born in Coatbridge, North Lanarkshire, Scotland, on 5 April 1925, she was brought up in Hatch End, London after her father Oscar moved there to take a job at the Post Office Research Station developing the speaking clock. She left school at 14 and took a place at Harrow School of Art.

== Studies ==
In 1946 she began studying etching and engraving at the Royal College of Art, married actor Patrick Jordan, and illustrated her first book, Robert Louis Stevenson's A Child's Garden of Verses, for the Oxford University Press.

== Artistic career ==
After a series of commissions for the Oxford University Press, Gill began an association with The Bodley Head, for whom she illustrated over thirty books between 1957 and 1982, including Margaret Kornitzer’s 1960 novel about adoption, Mr Fairweather and his Family, and books by Anita Hewett, Roger Lancelyn Green and others. John Ryder, the publisher's design and art director, said her early work was "interfered with, rather than aided" by her background in etching and engraving, but as her drawings became bolder her work became more in demand, her serious, unsentimental view of childhood suiting the kitchen sink realism prevalent in children's books at the time. She remarked "that is often how children are — taking their own lives seriously".

Eleanor Graham, the founding editor of Puffin Books, also sought her out to illustrate books including a 1961 edition of A Little Princess by Frances Hodgson Burnett. She worked for numerous other publishers, including Jonathan Cape, for whom she illustrated Susan Cooper's Over Sea, Under Stone in 1965, and Chatto & Windus, for whom she illustrated Cooper's Dawn of Fear in 1972, drawing on her own memories of living in London during the Second World War. Cooper said of her work on Dawn of Fear, "She caught the image of the kids I was writing about perfectly, with no communication. That does huge things for the confidence of a writer." She illustrated A Candle in Her Room for Gollancz in 1966. She would often travel to capture the landscape and setting of books she illustrated, particularly those by Ruth Arthur and William Mayne, and for this reason a German publisher commissioned her to illustrate a German translation of Arthur Ransome's Swallows and Amazons.

She was admired by fellow illustrator Shirley Hughes, who said "I thought her work was terrific. It made me look to my laurels. It was modern - the children she depicted were less sweet. Margery used solid black line with tremendous fluidity and ease: the way her children stood and moved was very distinctive."

== Personal life ==
She combined freelance work as an illustrator with motherhood - she had two daughters - and a teaching job at Maidstone College of Art. From 1969 she and her husband lived in Alpheton in Suffolk. As the 1970s went on her work fell out of fashion as publishers preferred cartoonier illustrations for children's books, and her output was slowed by arthritis in her hands, and in her later years, cataracts. The last book she illustrated was Anne Thwaite's Pennies for the Dog in 1985. She did voluntary work in her retirement, including charity collections and Meals on Wheels. She died on 31 October 2008, survived by her husband, the older of their two daughters (their younger daughter died in 1996), four grandchildren and six great-grandchildren.
