= Matthew Hopkins in popular culture =

Matthew Hopkins (ca. 1620–1647) was an English witchhunter whose career flourished during the time of the English Civil War. Between 1644 and 1645, Hopkins and his associates were responsible for the deaths of more accused witches than had been executed in the previous 100 years.

== In fiction ==
=== Literature ===
- Burned: A Daughters of Salem Novel, a 2023 young adult novel by Kellie O'Neill, features a group of modern-day witch hunters who are the descendants of Hopkins.
- In the 17th century, Jacob Bright composed a poem mocking Hopkins that gained approval from royalists and Catholics, shown below:

As I gazed out my Window Glass
Matthew Hopkins Did by me pass
I asked him, pray, where was he Going
said he, Only Satan may be knowing

and by his Side there walk'd a Man
in a way that only Satan can
and in his eye a wicked Gleam
that proved he was high in Satan's esteem.

Art thou a witch? he asked askance,
or rogue or Ghoul or ghost or Nonce?
Quoth I, I am sainted AUGUSTINE
and thou art but a Daemon Swine

PALE his face that moment went
all his evil powers spent
I took some water from a shelf
and pour'd it onto the Hopkins elf.

at this the Hopkin he did shriek
and writhing, did he grow a beak
then after a beastly croke
the monstre disappeared in smoke

THIS proves how GOD and Church prevail
AND Daemons and sinners can do naught but wail.
FOR torment you a crone of Christian disposition
THEN surely your doom Christ will make his mission.

- Witchfinder General, a 1966 novel by Ronald Bassett. Hopkins is depicted as being significantly older than he was in reality.
- The Devil on the Road, a 1978 novel by Robert Westall in which Hopkins makes a late appearance.
- Sarum, the 1987 novel by Edward Rutherfurd, features Hopkins making a brief appearance in Wiltshire, where he becomes involved in a family quarrel and in an apparent attempt to frame Margaret Shockley as a witch.
- Good Omens (1990), by Terry Pratchett and Neil Gaiman, parodies Hopkins' title through the characters of Newton Pulsifer, entitled "Witchfinder Private" and "Witchfinder Sergeant" Shadwell of the Witchfinder Army, of which Hopkins is said to be the last General.
- A Discovery of Witches (2011), the first volume in the All Souls Trilogy by Deborah Harkness, features an allusion in its title to Hopkins' similarly named book The Discovery of Witches, his memoir of his witch-hunting career.
- Witch Hunt, a 2012 horror/thriller novel by Syd Moore, deals with a young woman who has growing visions of Hopkins and his victims. The book suggests a fictional end to Hopkins in that he flees England for New England in 1647 and continues his prosecution of witches there.
- Pride Before a Fall Through Time, a 2016 novel by Miles Craven, has Hopkins as a character.
- The Witchfinder's Sister, a 2017 novel by Beth Underdown, follows the story of Hopkins' semi-fictional sister, Alice. Hopkins and his role in the East Anglian witch-hunts during the English Civil War feature heavily.
- The Manningtree Witches, a 2021 novel by A. K. Blakemore about the Manningtree witch trials, features Hopkins as a character.

=== Theatre ===
- The Witchfinder Project, a short musical by Ipswich-based composer Amy Mallett.
- The Ungodly, a play by Joanna Carrick, performed at The Avenue Theatre, Ipswich, in October–November 2023, and again in October 2024, and at the Southwark Playhouse, London, in October–November 2024, concerns Hopkins' development into a witchfinder and his relationship with his step sister, Susan Edwards (née Witham, a historical character, probably the daughter of Matthew's mother's second husband), and her husband Richard. An Off-Broadway production in New York has been announced for Spring 2025.

=== Film & TV ===
- Witchfinder General, (US: The Conqueror Worm) a 1968 film based on Bassett's novel starring Vincent Price as Matthew Hopkins (as in the novel, Hopkins is shown as far older than he was historically).
- Blackadder featured a satirical character in episode 5 of the first series in 1983 called the Witchsmeller Pursuivant who tries and burns those accused of witchcraft.
- The Lords of Salem had Udo Kier playing the part of Matthew Hopkins, but his scenes were deleted.
- Whitechapel in the detective's 4th series a serial killer likened to Matthew Hopkins is killing 'alleged' witches in modern-day London
- The Witchfinder, a 2022 BBC Two sitcom based on a suspected witch being escorted by Witchfinder across East Anglia for trial, with Hopkins featuring as a secondary character portrayed by Reece Shearsmith.

== In music ==
- "Witchfinder General" is a song by the Jamaican disco singer Carl Douglas, from his 1974 album Kung Fu Fighting and Other Great Love Songs.
- Witchfinder General is a doom metal band from England.
  - "Witchfinder General" is a song by the band of the same name, from their 1982 debut album Death Penalty.
- "Hopkins (The Witchfinder General)" is a song by the doom metal band Cathedral, from the 1995 album The Carnival Bizarre.
- "Witchfinder General" is a song by the heavy metal band Saxon, from the 2004 album Lionheart.
- Darren Hayman's 2012 concept album The Violence is partially based on Hopkins's witch trials in Essex, with songs like "We Are Not Evil" being written from his Hopkin's perspective.

== In other media ==
- Matthew Hopkins was used to advertise Walkers Square Crisps. Several of his witch-hunting methods were parodied (notably ordeal by water). His catchphrase was "'Tis not normal". Commemorative square pogs featuring Hopkins were also released to coincide with the adverts.
- He made an appearance as a "mystery guest" on the BBC show Russell Howard's Good News. In Puritan garb, Hopkins accused Howard of being a follower of the Devil.
- The character of The Paedofinder General in the comedy series Monkey Dust is based on the modern film portrayal of the Witchfinder General.
- In the MMORPG RuneScape, the Botfinder General is based on Matthew Hopkins. The role played here is sentencing and then permanently banning accounts that are accused of macroing.
- Steve Coogan plays a character based on Matthew Hopkins called 'Witch locater Captain Tobias Slater' from episode 6 'Scream Satan scream!' of the BBC comedy series Dr. Terrible's House of Horrible, first aired 17 December 2001.
- In the online free-to-play role-playing mobile game Fate/Grand Order, Matthew Hopkins was featured as one of the antagonists in Singularity Subspecies IV : Taboo Epiphany Garden : Salem of the Heresy (亜種特異IV 禁忌降臨庭園 セイラム 異端なるセイラム).
- In the dark fantasy turn-based strategy Disciples II: Dark Prophecy, the Hopkins-based character "Witch Hunter" is the first unit in the Inquisition line of the human faction.
- In the film ParaNorman, a colonial-era Puritan judge named Hopkins sentenced a young girl to death for witchcraft, and as a result he and the other townspeople were cursed to come back every year as zombies until the present day when the title character broke the curse.
- Hopkins largely inspired Philip Wittebane, the main antagonist of the 2020 animated TV series, The Owl House.
