= Alf Joint =

British stunt performer (1927–2005)

Joint in Witchfinder General (1968)

Alfred Charles Richard Joint (22 September 1927 – 25 July 2005) was a British film and television stunt performer, stunt coordinator and arranger.

== Career ==
He was notable for his contributions in numerous films over a 30-year period including: The Heroes of Telemark (1965), Kelly's Heroes (1970), The Omen (1976), A Bridge too Far (1977), Superman (1978), Superman II (1980), Superman IV: The Quest for Peace (1987), Return of the Jedi (1983) and the Bond films Goldfinger (1964) and On Her Majesty's Secret Service (1969). He also had small acting roles in some films including two Michael Reeves films, The Sorcerers (1967) and Witchfinder General (1968).

As a stuntman he specialised in high falls and fight scenes. He doubled for Sean Connery in the film Goldfinger and for Richard Burton and Clint Eastwood in Where Eagles Dare (1968). Memorable appearances include his fight with Connery as the Mexican thug Capungo in Goldfinger. The fight ends with the character's electrocution in a bath when a sunlamp is thrown in by Bond, followed by his famous quip "Shocking...Positively shocking". Joint also took part in the fight scene on the top of a cable car in Where Eagles Dare and performed a jump from one cable car to another doubling for Richard Burton.

On television he appeared in Doctor Who, Dick Turpin, Return to Treasure Island, Danger Man, The Prisoner, The Avengers, Space: 1999, The Adventures of Sherlock Holmes, (for which he plunged 430 ft into the Reichenbach Falls doubling for Eric Porter) and London's Burning. He also performed a memorable stunt for a Cadbury Milk Tray television commercial in which the hero was seen diving off a cliff into the sea. Prior, he was an active gaffer (film electrician), having worked on An American Werewolf In London (1981).

Joint was a mentor to younger stuntmen such as Vic Armstrong and the late Rod Woodruff (d.2011). He retired in 1995 and died in 2005 of cancer aged 77.

== Filmography ==
Year	Title	Role	Notes
1964	Goldfinger	Capungo	
1965	The Heroes of Telemark	German Guard on Ferry	Uncredited
1966	The Projected Man	Security Man	
1967	Casino Royale	Man in Casino	Uncredited
1967	The Sorcerers	Ron, the mechanic	
1967	The Dirty Dozen	German Sentry Wanting Light	Uncredited
1968	Witchfinder General	Sentry	
1968	The Lost Continent	Jason, a Crewman	
1968	Great Catherine	Russian General	Uncredited
1971	Macbeth	Old Seyward	
1972	Rentadick	Policeman	
1972	Steptoe and Son	Strip Club Patron	Uncredited
1974	S*P*Y*S	KGB agent	Uncredited
1975	Brannigan	Man in Bar	Uncredited
1975	Permission to Kill	MacNeil	
1981	Rise and Fall of Idi Amin	American Ambassador	
