= Paul Ferris (composer) =

English composer and actor (1941–1995)

Ferris in Witchfinder General (1968)

Richard Paul Ferris (2 May 1941 – 30 October 1995) was an English composer and actor. Born in Corby, Northamptonshire, England, Ferris provided scores for various low budget British horror films during the late 1960s and early 1970s.

== Career ==
Ferris began made a few acting appearances from 1961 such as Dixon of Dock Green and the 1964 comedy film Rattle of a Simple Man. In 1965 he was seen as John Mannering's sidekick David Marlowe in The Baron before his character was replaced by Sue Lloyd at the insistence of American television executives. He briefly appeared in the 1967 James Bond spoof Casino Royale as one of Vesper Lynd's business staff.

As a songwriter, Ferris wrote Cliff Richard's 1966 number 7 UK hit "Visions" and The Shadows' 1967 number 24 UK hit "Maroc 7" from the film of the same name.

He is probably best known for his rousing score for Michael Reeves' Witchfinder General (1968), in which he also appeared in a bit part under the pseudonym "Morris Jar" (in tribute to composer Maurice Jarre). Due to convoluted rights issues, Ferris's critically acclaimed music had been wiped from the soundtrack for the film's U.S. videotape and laserdisc releases for decades, replaced by a generic synthesizer score by Kendall Schmidt. In 2007 the film was released on DVD under the MGM Midnite Movies banner by 20th Century Fox Home Entertainment, with Ferris's score intact. He also scored Reeves' The She Beast (1966) and The Sorcerers (1967), as well as other British films including The Blood Beast Terror (1967), Clegg (1970), The Creeping Flesh (1973) and Persecution (1974).

== Death ==
A long-time sufferer of Huntington's Chorea, Ferris died by suicide by drug overdose at the age of 54.
