= Bloody Britain =

Bloody Britain is a British history documentary, presented by TV comedian Rory McGrath and produced by Sophie Theunissen for the Discovery Channel.

The series looks into Britain's more gruesome past, such as public executions and bloody battles. The show uses computer animation to create a more realistic and in depth program.

== Episode list ==
1. The Peasants' Revolt
2. Jack the Ripper
3. The Vikings
4. The Welsh Rebellions
5. The Monmouth Rebellion
6. The Witchfinder General
7. The Siege of Rochester
8. The Body Snatchers
9. Bloody Mary
10. The Battle of Trafalgar
