= Manningtree =

Town and civil parish in Essex, England

Coordinates: 51.9443°N 1.0614°E

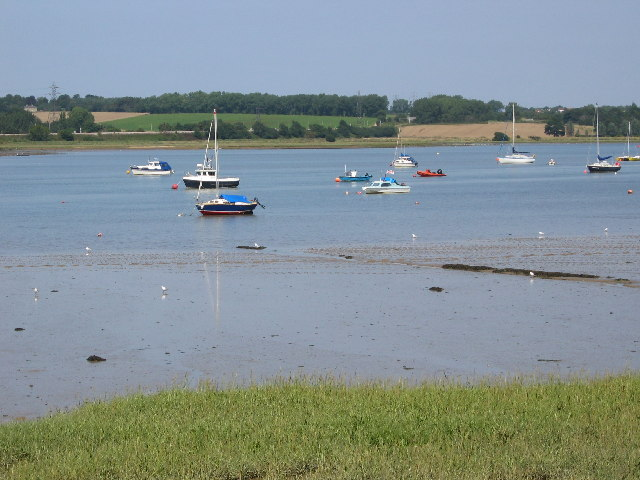
- The River Stour at Manningtree

- Location within Essex
- Population: 874 (Parish, 2021); 1,761 (Built up area, 2021)
- OS grid reference: TM105317
- District: Tendring
- Shire county: Essex
- Region: East
- Country: England
- Sovereign state: United Kingdom
- Post town: MANNINGTREE
- Postcode district: CO11
- Dialling code: 01206
- Police: Essex
- Fire: Essex
- Ambulance: East of England
- UK Parliament: Harwich and North Essex

Manningtree is a town and civil parish in the Tendring district of Essex, England. It lies on the River Stour and forms part of the Suffolk Coast and Heaths Area of Outstanding Natural Beauty. At the 2021 census the parish had a population of 874 and the built up area (which extends into the neighbouring parishes of Lawford and Mistley) had a population of 1,761.

== History ==
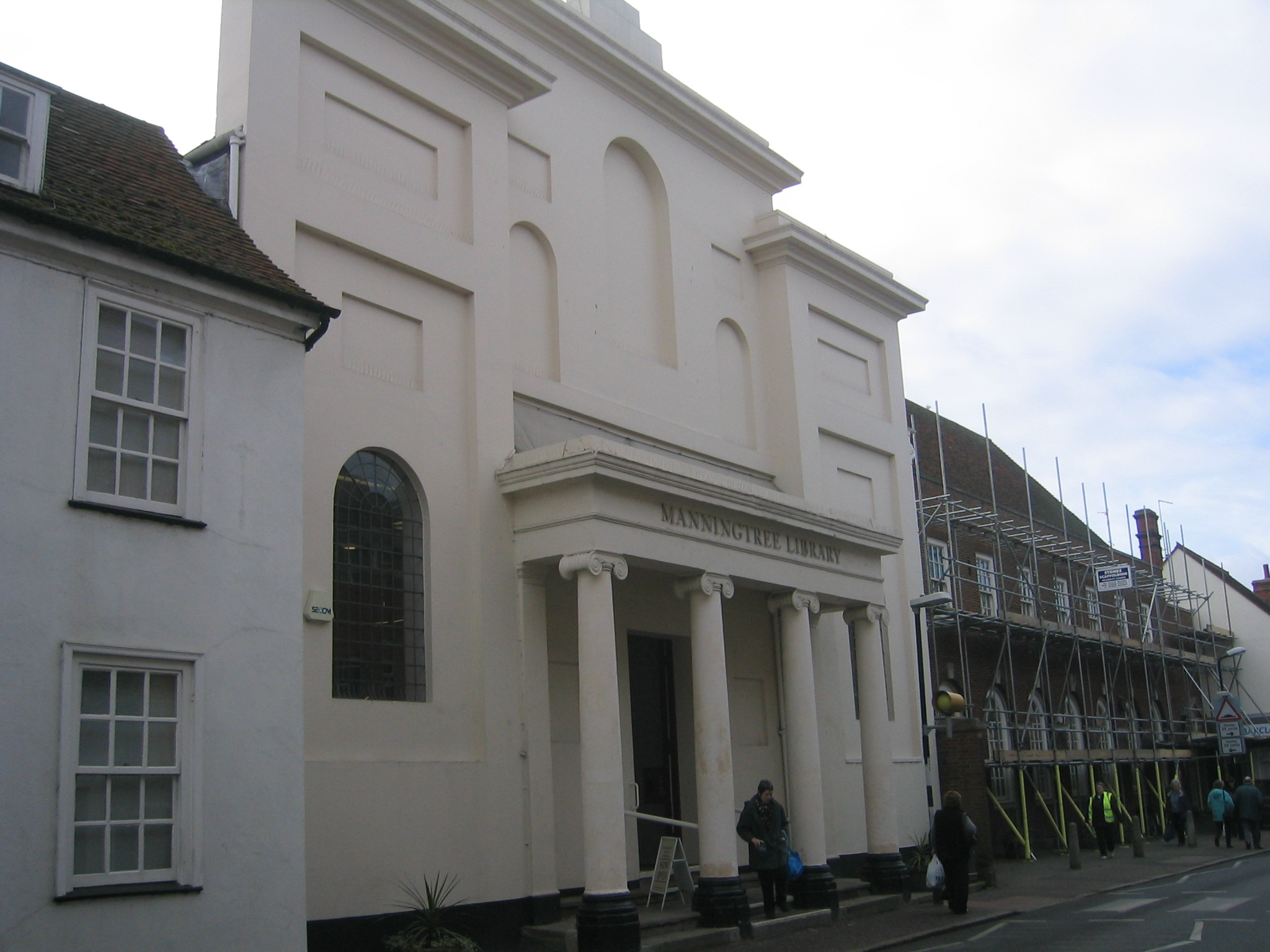
Manningtree Library

The name Manningtree is thought to derive from 'many trees'. The town grew around the wool trade from the 15th century until its decline in the 18th century and also had a thriving shipping trade in corn, timber and coal until this declined with the coming of the railway. Manningtree is known as the centre of the activities of Matthew Hopkins, the self-appointed Witchfinder General, who claimed to have overheard local women discussing their meetings with the devil in 1644 with his accusations leading to their execution as witches.

Many of the buildings in the centre of the town have Georgian facades which obscure their earlier origins. Notable buildings include Manningtree Library, which was originally built as 'a public hall for the purposes of corn exchange' and was later used around 1900 for public entertainment, and the Methodist church located on South Street, completed in 1807.

The Ascension, by John Constable, which now hangs in Dedham church, was commissioned in 1821 for the altarpiece of the early seventeenth-century church on the High Street, demolished in 1967.

== Governance ==
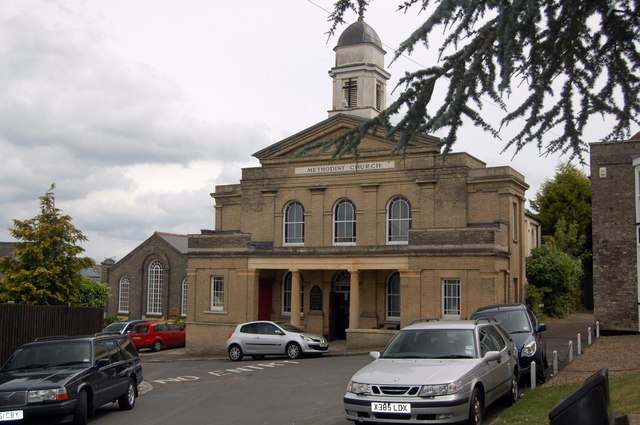
Methodist Church, South Street, with its church hall to the left

There are three tiers of local government covering Manningtree, at parish (town), district, and county level: Manningtree Town Council, Tendring District Council, and Essex County Council. The town council meets at the Methodist Church Hall on South Street.

=== Administrative history ===
Manningtree historically formed part of the ancient parish of Mistley. Manningtree developed as a market town after it was granted a market charter in 1238. The town was administered for some purposes by a guild, giving it some of the characteristics of a borough, but borough status was never formalised and the guild had ceased operating by the early 19th century.

A church dedicated to St Michael was built in the High Street in 1616. It was initially a chapel of ease to St Mary's Church at Mistley. The chapelry of Manningtree was then administered separately from Mistley for civil parish functions under the poor laws, whilst remaining part of the ecclesiastical parish of Mistley. Manningtree was subsequently also made a separate ecclesiastical parish from Mistley in 1840. The area ceded from Mistley to the chapelry and later parish of Manningtree was very tightly drawn around the core of the town as it then was. The first Ordnance Survey map to show detailed parish boundaries of this area, published in 1881, recorded that Manningtree parish only covered 22 acres (9 hectares).

When elected parish and district councils were established in 1894, Manningtree was given a parish council and included in the Tendring Rural District. The rural district was replaced in 1974 by the larger Tendring District. The ecclesiastical parish of Manningtree was reunited with Mistley in 1967, but Manningtree remains a separate civil parish. Following the reunion of the ecclesiastical parishes in 1967, St Michael's at Manningtree was demolished, and St Mary's at Mistley was renamed St Mary and St Michael.

=== Smallest town claim ===
As part of the 1974 reforms, each parish council was given the right to declare its parish to be a town, allowing it to take the title of town council and give the chair of the council the title of mayor. Manningtree Parish Council exercised this right in 1998, becoming Manningtree Town Council. Since then it has claimed to be the smallest town by land area in England, although its population exceeds that of Fordwich in Kent, which was also the smallest town by land area prior to 1998.

In 2009, proposals were considered for merging Manningtree with Mistley and Lawford to form a single parish. The merger was not pursued.

== Geography ==
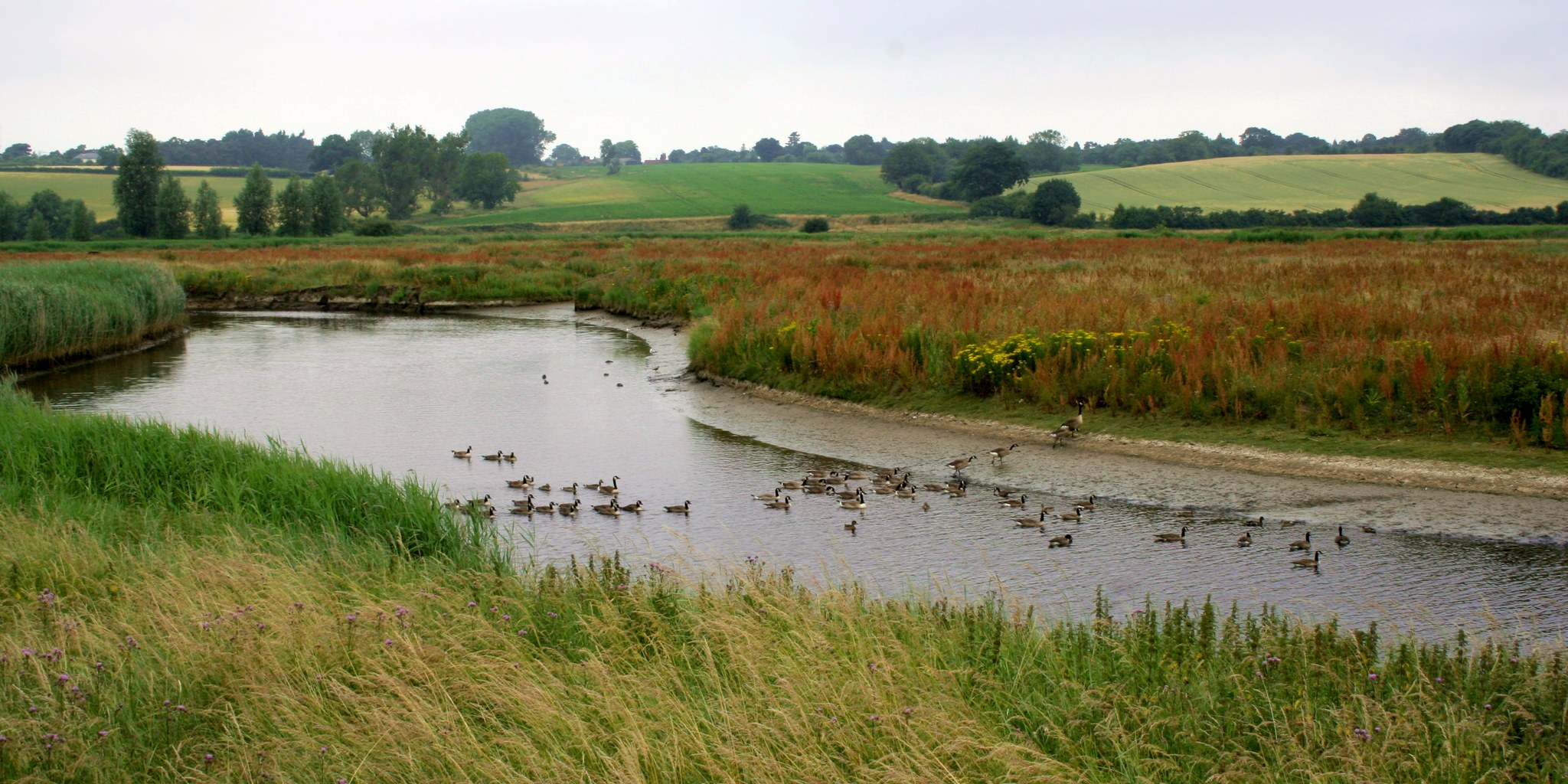
River Stour near Manningtree

Manningtree is on Holbrook Bay, part of the River Stour in the north of Essex. It is the eastern edge of Dedham Vale.

Manningtree's built up area as defined by the Office for National Statistics following the 2021 census extends beyond the parish boundary to the east to include part of Mistley parish, and also includes some eastern fringes of Lawford parish. A separate Lawford built up area is identified which immediately abuts the Manningtree built up area. The Manningtree built up area had a population in 2021 of 1,761 and the adjacent Lawford built up area had a population of 4,579.

Nearby villages include Dedham, Mistley, Lawford, Wrabness and Brantham.

== Transport ==
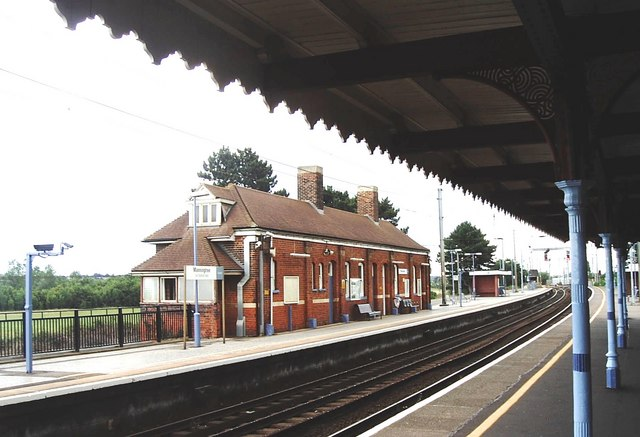
Manningtree railway station

Manningtree railway station is on the Great Eastern Main Line and provides regular, direct services to London, Norwich and Harwich. The station is actually located in the parish of Lawford.

== Media ==
Local news and television programmes are provided by BBC East and ITV Anglia. Television signals are received from the Sudbury TV transmitter.

The town is served by both BBC Essex and BBC Radio Suffolk. Other radio stations including Heart East, Greatest Hits Radio Essex, and Actual Radio.

Harwich and Manningtree Standard is the town's local newspaper which publishes on Fridays.

== In fiction ==
Manningtree features in Ronald Bassett's 1966 novel Witchfinder General and in A. K. Blakemore's 2021 novel The Manningtree Witches.

In Shakespeare’s Henry IV Part I (Act 2 Scene 4), Falstaff is referred to as “that roasted Manningtree ox“. This was marked in 2000 with a sculpture of an ox in the town centre.

A. K. Blakemore's 2021 novel, The Manningtree Witches, is set in the town. The novel won the Desmond Elliott Prize 2021, being described by the judges as "a stunning achievement."

== Notable people ==
- Margaret Thatcher lived and worked in Manningtree and worked for BX Plastics
- Matthew Hopkins, the self-styled Witch-Finder General, lived in Manningtree
- Henry Patten, the 2024 Gentlemen's Wimbledon doubles champion lived in Manningtree.

== Twin town ==
Manningtree is twinned with Frankenberg, Hesse, Germany.
