= John Gaule =

English demonologist

John Gaule (1603? – 1687) was an English Puritan cleric, now remembered for his partially sceptical views on astrology, witchcraft and hermetic philosophy.

== Life ==
He studied at both Oxford and Cambridge, graduating B.A. at Magdalene College, Cambridge in 1623/4. For a time, he appears to have been employed by Robert Bertie, 1st Earl of Lindsey, probably as chaplain. By 1629, he was chaplain to Baptist Hicks, 1st Viscount Campden.

Gaule's one preferment was as vicar of Great Staughton, Huntingdonshire, through Viscountess Campden by 1632, though there is some confusion on the point. After the Stuart Restoration, he claimed in a petition to the Parliament of England that he had been imprisoned by the Parliamentary army 'for declaring the unlawfulness of the war against the King', and had been in danger of being shot by order of Edward Whalley.

== Select Cases of Conscience touching Witches and Witchcraft ==
Gaule clashed with, and preached against, the self-appointed witch-hunter active in East Anglia, Matthew Hopkins. This took place around 1646, when Hopkins and John Stearne were operating in Huntingdonshire. As a result, and to expose the methods used by Hopkins, he wrote Select Cases of Conscience touching Witches and Witchcraft, London, 1646. The work was dedicated to the Huntingdonshire Member of Parliament and notable member of the Parliamentarian faction, Valentine Wauton.

Gaule himself followed the position of William Perkins on witchcraft. He objected to the "swimming test" for witches, used by Hopkins and Stearne in the first half of 1645. Unusually for the time, Gaule engaged with the question of the imp or familiar spirit thought to accompany a witch. While he was convinced enough that witchcraft existed, he suspected theories about it were connected with popular superstition rather than scriptural sources. He distinguished between the workings of a magician and the spells of a witch, leaving some room for the former to operate in good conscience.

Gaule took a legalistic and evidentiary approach to witchcraft. He argued for stringent standards of evidence, but also that circumstantial evidence should be admitted because of the difficulty of conviction. His works were consulted at the time of the Salem witch trials for criteria to apply to cases. Cotton Mather in his Wonders of the Invisible World gave an account of Gaule's witch-theories and their discriminations; George Lincoln Burr regarded the account as distorted, however.

== Other activities ==
With Henry Jeanes, Nathaniel Stephens and Anthony Burgess, he took part in the presbyterian attack on Jeremy Taylor's doctrine of original sin. His views appeared in a rare work, Sapientia Justificata (1657). He also criticised Erasmus on the same topic, from the Calvinist angle.

At the time of the Restoration, Gaule wrote a tract, An Admonition moving to Moderation, holding forth certain brief heads of wholesom advice to the late and yet immoderate Party, London, 1660, to which he prefixed a dedication to Charles II of England. He also demanded a compensation from the confiscated estate of former MP Valentine Wauton, by that time a fugitive regicide, asserting that the latter had 'detained from him (for) six years' 'the arrears of his living'.

== Other works ==
Other writings by Gaule were:

- The Practiqve Theorists Panegyrick. … A Sermon preached at Pauls-Crosse, London, 1628.
- Distractions, or the Holy Madnesse. Feruently (not Furiously) inraged against Euill Men, or against their Euills, London, 1629.
- Practiqve Theories, or Votiue Speculations, vpon Iesvs Christs Prediction, Incarnation, Passion, Resurrection, London, 1629. Frontispiece was by Christof le Blon.
- Practiqve Theories, or Votiue Speculations vpon Abrahams Entertainment of the three Angels, &c., 3 parts, London, 1630.
- A Defiance to Death. Being the Funebrious Commemoration of … Viscount Camden, London, 1630.
- A Sermon of the Saints judging the World. Preached at the Assizes holden in Huntingdon, London, 1649.
- Πῦς-μαντία. The Mag-Astro-Mancer, or the Magicall-Astrologicall-Diviner posed and puzzled, London, 1652. Another edition under the title of A Collection out of the best approved Authors, containing Histories of Visions, &c., was published without Gaule's name in 1657. This general attack on magic was dedicated to Oliver Cromwell. In it Gaule lamented that people generally were more ready to consult an almanac than the Bible.
