= Robert Russell (actor) =

English actor (1936–2008)

- Russell in Witchfinder General (1968)
- Born: 24 May 1936; Kent, England
- Died: 12 May 2008 (aged 71); Maidenhead, Berkshire, England
- Education: Webber Douglas Academy of Dramatic Art
- Occupation: Actor
- Years active: 1960–1992

Robert Russell (24 May 1936 – 12 May 2008) was an English stage and screen actor. He is best known to horror film fans for his portrayal of John Stearne in the film Witchfinder General (1968).

== Life and career ==
Russell was born in Kent, England. Between the ages of 11 and 20, he and his family with South Africa, where he worked in a gold mine. He returned to England and trained at the Webber Douglas Academy of Dramatic Art. He then appeared onstage with Laurence Olivier and actors such as Sir Michael Gambon, as a member of the National Theatre touring company.

He made numerous appearances on UK television, often playing tough characters and villains due to his imposing stature, including The Avengers, Public Eye, The Sweeney, Space: 1999, Blake's 7 and Doctor Who, playing a guard in the serial entitled The Power of the Daleks and a Highland Games Champion, The Caber, in Terror of the Zygons. Some of his other film appearances included Othello (1965), The Whisperers (1967), Bedazzled (1967) with Peter Cook and Dudley Moore, Inspector Clouseau (1968), The Breaking of Bumbo (1970), Man in the Wilderness (1971) with Richard Harris, Sitting Target (1972), Ivanhoe (1982), Oliver Twist (1982), and the TV film of The Sign of Four (1983).

He lived for the last 14 years of his life in Maidenhead, Berkshire and died there of a heart attack at his home aged 71.

== Partial filmography ==
- 1961 The Sinister Man as Uniformed Sergeant
- 1964 Shadow of Fear as Ransome
- 1965 Othello as Senators-Soldiers-Cypriots
- 1967 The Whisperers as Andy
- 1967 Robbery as Detective
- 1967 Bedazzled as Anger
- 1968 Inspector Clouseau as Stockton
- 1968 Witchfinder General as John Stearne
- 1969 The Spy Killer as Police Sergeant
- 1970 Eyewitness as Headquarters Policeman
- 1970 The Breaking of Bumbo as Sergeant Clegg
- 1971 Man in the Wilderness as Smith
- 1972 Sitting Target as Prison Warder One
- 1980 Silver Dream Racer as Garage Mechanic
- 1982 Ivanhoe as Leader
- 1982 Oliver Twist as 2nd Constable
- 1983 The Sign of Four as Williams
- 1985 Black Arrow as Appleyard
- 2003 Hitler: The Rise of Evil as Franz Von Papen
