= The Baron (TV series) =

British television series (1965–1966)

- Created by: John Creasey (source); Monty Berman; Robert S. Baker
- Developed by: Terry Nation
- Starring: Steve Forrest; Sue Lloyd; Colin Gordon; Paul Ferris
- Theme music composer: Edwin Astley
- Composer: Edwin Astley
- Country of origin: United Kingdom
- Original language: English
- No. of series: 1
- No. of episodes: 30

Production
- Producer: Monty Berman
- Running time: 49 mins
- Production company: Mid-Century Film Productions Ltd for ITC

Original release
- Network: ITV
- Release: 28 September 1966 – 19 April 1967

The Baron is a British television series that was made in 1965 and 1966. It is based on the book series by John Creasey (written under the pseudonym Anthony Morton) and produced by ITC Entertainment. Thirty colour episodes were produced, and the show was exported to the American ABC network.

== Overview ==
The show starred an American actor, Steve Forrest, as John Mannering, an antiques dealer who drives a Jensen C-V8 with 'BAR 1' as the distinctive, personalised number plate. 'The Baron' is portrayed as an occasional undercover agent working in an informal capacity for the head of the fictional British Diplomatic Intelligence, Templeton-Green (Colin Gordon) assisted by Cordelia Winfield (Sue Lloyd) and David Marlowe (Paul Ferris).

By contrast, in Creasey's original novels, Mannering is British and, after the first few novels, married. By transforming the character into an eligible bachelor and casting a Texan in the role, the producers decided that 'The Baron' would be nicknamed after the cattle ranch once run by his grandfather, described as being "200,000 acres [809.371 km^{2}] 300 miles from Dallas". In the books he is a reformed jewel thief (the first few novels describing Mannering's "career" from his deciding to steal to his going straight) whose criminal ties served him well in investigating jewel, art, or antiques-oriented mysteries. For the TV series, Mannering's persona is depicted as absolutely straight with no suggestion of past criminality, a fact underlined by his being co-opted by British intelligence. In the episode "Red Horse, Red Rider", it is revealed that Mannering had been a US Army Captain during the Second World War, serving in the Monuments, Fine Arts, and Archives program where he recovered art works from the Nazis. Following the war, he owned three antique stores and was a "charter member of the jet set".

The original series of The Baron was last repeated and broadcast in colour by Great! Action in 2026.

== Cast and characters ==
- Steve Forrest as John Mannering (alias "The Baron")
- Sue Lloyd as Cordelia Winfield
- Colin Gordon as John Alexander Templeton-Green
- Paul Ferris as David Marlowe

Although not regular cast members, Reginald Marsh and Derek Newark also appeared in three episodes (once reprising earlier roles, and once playing different characters). Occasionally, actors were used twice but in different roles in the same run of episodes, including Paul Maxwell, Peter Bowles, George Murcell and Edwin Richfield.

== Production ==
Like other ITC shows, The Baron shared a lot of its production crew with the other productions of the time (Danger Man, The Saint etc.), including guest cast members Peter Wyngarde and Bernard Lee, and directors Roy Ward Baker and Robert Asher. The lion's share of the scripts were by Dennis Spooner and Dalek creator Terry Nation. A few episodes were credited to Tony O'Grady, a pseudonym of The Avengers writer-producer Brian Clemens.

The character of Mannering was, like Simon Templar in The Saint, a member of the jet set, whose glamorous lifestyle was typified by air travel to exotic locations, which at the time was still only easily available to the wealthy. However, filming never left the UK; it was filmed chiefly in and around Elstree Studios in Borehamwood, Hertfordshire, then owned by Associated British Pictures. Locations used included Haberdashers' Aske's School in Elstree, St Albans and Ivinghoe Beacon. These featured prominently in several other ITC series of the same era. The backlot at Elstree in particular was extensively used, being transformed alternately into Mannering's antiques shop, a Mexican town, a Parisian nightclub, an East European police station and many others besides.

Paul Ferris was originally cast as Mannering's assistant David Marlowe. However, after pressure from the US network ABC, Marlowe was dropped in favour of the more glamorous Cordelia who had appeared in the first episode. She is 'reintroduced' in "Something for a Rainy Day", the ninth episode to be made, although broadcast third. As originally broadcast, the 'Cordelia' and 'Marlowe' episodes are interspersed, even though Paul Ferris left the production after eight episodes were filmed.

As with other ITC series, the American market was vital; several episodes were overdubbed (e.g. "petrol" becoming "gas", "whisky" becoming "Scotch") to ensure they were fit for US audiences. Roy Ward Baker stated that owing to US sponsorship by a cigarette company, characters "were allowed to light up only in moments of leisure, never when they were frightened or under duress". The show did not do well enough on ABC and was syndicated midway through its run, which effectively ensured that no second series would be made.

The Baron's car was a silver Jensen CV-8 Mk II with the registration BAR 1. Unlike the Volvo driven by Simon Templar, the exclusivity of the car meant the series did not generate the same sales boost as The Saint had done for Volvo. Cordelia drove a considerably less upmarket DAF Daffodil 33. The episode "Something for a Rainy Day" featured shots of a white Jaguar plummeting over a cliff. This footage, apparently filmed for this episode (from several angles), reappeared in several other episodes and series, in an attempt to render its high cost worthwhile.

The episode "Portrait of Louisa" was a reworking by Terry Nation of his earlier script "Lida", written for (and produced as) an episode of The Saint.

The Baron was the first ITC show without marionettes to be produced entirely in colour. (ITC marionette series Stingray and Thunderbirds had been filmed in colour; the last fourteen of the thirty episodes of The Adventures of Sir Lancelot in 1956-57 had been shot in colour, as had the 1962 pilot episode of Man of the World).

== Feature films ==
Two films were put together for international cinema distribution by ITC; these were compiled from the two-part episodes. Mystery Island is a re-edit of the episodes "Storm Warning" and "The Island", while The Man in a Looking Glass is a combination of "Masquerade" and "The Killing". This led to further European releases in the 1960s of ITC films re-edited from episodes of The Saint, Danger Man, The Champions and Man in a Suitcase.

== Episodes ==
Episodes were filmed between July 1965 and October 1966, on location and at Elstree Studios.

Although filmed in colour, all episodes were broadcast in the UK in black and white, colour transmissions on ITV not commencing until November 1969.

Airdate is for ATV Midlands. ITV regions varied date and order.

No.	Title	Directed by	Written by	Filmed	Original release date	Prod. code
1	"Diplomatic Immunity"	Leslie Norman	Dennis Spooner	Aug/Sep 1965	28 September 1966	104
A girl steals a valuable Fabergé miniature from Mannering's London shop, and claims diplomatic immunity in the Pamaranean embassy. She is known to British Intelligence's head, Templeton-Green, who is investigating a number of antique thefts. Mannering, to regain his Fabergé, agrees to go to Pamaranea, where he is assisted by Templeton-Green's local agent Cordelia Winfield. Co-starring: Sue Lloyd, Colin Gordon and Paul Ferris. Guest stars: Dora Reisser, Frank Gatliff, Michael Wolf, Jolyon Booth and Claire Davenport.
2	"Epitaph for a Hero"	John Moxey	Terry Nation	Oct 1965	3 February 1966	107
Co-starring Sue Lloyd, Colin Gordon and Paul Ferris. Guest stars: Patricia Haines, Paul Maxwell and Artro Morris, Nosher Powell.
3	"Something for a Rainy Day"	Cyril Frankel	Terry Nation	Nov/Dec 1965	12 October 1966	109
The Baron acts as go-between in a case involving an insurer's recovery of stolen treasure and the former thief's knowledge of their whereabouts. Co-starring Sue Lloyd. Guest stars: Lois Maxwell, Ann Lynn, Patrick Allen, Derek Newark and Julian Sherrier.
4	"Red Horse, Red Rider"	John Moxey	Terry Nation	Aug 1965	19 October 1966	102
Mannering finds himself transporting a priceless statuette out of a fascist state at the request of an ailing freedom fighter. Co-starring: Paul Ferris. Guest stars: Jane Merrow, John Bennett, Edward Brayshaw, Harold Goldblatt, Sandor Elès and John Bryans.
5	"Enemy of the State"	Jeremy Summers	Dennis Spooner	Dec 1965	26 October 1966	110
Cordelia is arrested by a hostile government, and Mannering hatches a plan to exchange her for a top-ranking official. Co-starring: Sue Lloyd and Colin Gordon. Guest stars: Anton Diffring, Joseph Furst, John Abineri, Richard Carpenter, Gary Watson, Terence Lodge, George Roubicek, Stephen Hubay, Frederick Schiller, Martin Miller and Michael Wolf.
6	"Masquerade (part one)"	Cyril Frankel	Terry Nation	Feb/Mar 1966	2 November 1966	114
7	"The Killing (part two)"	Cyril Frankel	Terry Nation	Feb/Mar 1966	9 November 1966	115
The Baron acquires an exact double, as a criminal gang attempt to pull off the most audacious robbery of them all. Co-starring: Sue Lloyd. Guest stars: Bernard Lee, Kenneth J. Warren (as Fox-Stuart, substituting for Colin Gordon who was unavailable for filming), John Carson, Geoffrey Palmer, John Gill and Peter Thomas. Released as a feature film titled The Man in a Looking Glass.
8	"The Persuaders"	Leslie Norman	Dennis Spooner	Oct 1965	16 November 1966	108
David Marlowe is kidnapped; as the ransom, Mannering is forced to sell a fake painting to a particular client. Why? Co-starring: Paul Ferris and Colin Gordon. Guest stars: James Villiers, Derek Benfield, Georgina Ward, Ronald Hines, Charles Houston, Reginald Jessup, Virginia Stride, Martin Wyldeck and Jennifer Clulow.
9	"And Suddenly You're Dead"	Cyril Frankel	Terry Nation and Dennis Spooner	Jan 1966	23 November 1966	112
The mysterious death in the French Alps of a friend of Cordelia leads Mannering to uncover a plot to sell a particularly lethal strain of germ warfare to the highest bidder. Co-starring: Sue Lloyd. Guest stars: Alan MacNaughtan, Kay Walsh, Bernard Kay, John Collin, Vladek Sheybal, George Pravda and Conrad Monk.
10	"The Legions of Ammak"	John Moxey	Michael Cramoy	Aug 1965	30 November 1966	103
The Baron is duped into facilitating an unusual deal between the King of Ammak and an eccentric millionaire to buy the Legions of Ammak, part of the Ammak Crown Jewels. David Marlowe, however, spots that the 'King' is an impostor, which uncovers a plot to depose the real King and carve up Ammak's oil-rich reserves. Co-starring: Paul Ferris. Guest stars: Michael Godfrey, Arthur Hewlett, Peter Wyngarde and George Murcell.
11	"Samurai West"	John Moxey	Brian Degas	Jul 1965	7 December 1966	101
The sale of a valuable Samurai sword stirs up old rivalries between a former Japanese prisoner-of-war commandant and a British prisoner. Co-starring: Paul Ferris. Guest stars: Lee Montague, Raymond Huntley, Jeanne Roland, Larry Taylor, Colin Jeavons, Hal Dyer, Royston Tickner and Clifford Earl.
12	"The Maze"	Jeremy Summers	Tony O'Grady (pseudonym of Brian Clemens)	Jun/Jul 1966	14 December 1966	123
When the Baron comes to the aid of a frightened girl on a lonely country road, he suddenly loses 24 hours of his life. As he pieces together the puzzle of the missing hours, in the face of a sceptical police and Cordelia, he uncovers an assassination plot. Co-starring: Sue Lloyd. Guest stars: Alan MacNaughtan, Judith Arthy, Glynn Edwards, Royston Tickner and Richard Mathews.
13	"Portrait of Louisa"	John Moxey	Terry Nation	Sep 1965	21 December 1966	105
A close friend of Mannering is being blackmailed, but cannot confide in him. As he begins to suspect foul play, the race is on to find out who is blackmailing Louisa Trenton, and why. Co-starring: Paul Ferris. Guest stars: Moira Redmond, Terence Alexander, Jo Rowbottom, Brian Wilde and Mark Burns.
14	"There's Someone Close Behind You"	Roy Baker	Terry Nation and Dennis Spooner	Dec 1965	28 December 1966	111
When Mannering is the only witness to a murder perpetrated by a gangland boss, he decides the only way to protect himself is to go on the offensive. Co-starring: Sue Lloyd. Guest stars: Richard Wyler, Philip Madoc, Mike Pratt, Jerome Willis, Michael Robbins, Paul Harris and Peter Forbes-Robertson.
15	"Storm Warning (part one)"	Gordon Flemyng	Terry Nation	Jul/Aug 1966	4 January 1967	125
16	"The Island (part two)"	Gordon Flemyng	Terry Nation	Jul/Aug 1966	11 January 1967	126
Attempting to locate a missing shipment at the docks in Macau, Cordelia stumbles upon a murder on board a cargo vessel. She is immediately taken prisoner, and John Mannering stows away in order to free her, unaware that he is about to uncover a plot to sabotage a US space mission. Co-starring: Sue Lloyd. Guest stars: Reginald Marsh, Dudley Sutton, John Woodvine, David Healy, Derek Newark, Andy Ho, Michael Chow, Michael Hawkins and Jeffry Wickham. The episodes were spliced together into a film titled Mystery Island.
17	"Time to Kill"	Jeremy Summers	Dennis Spooner	May/Jun 1966	18 January 1967	121
A famous cameo with a curse attached causes trouble for Cordelia when she tries to broker a deal, only to discover the owner has been murdered, and the killers are going to extreme lengths to obtain it. Co-starring: Sue Lloyd. Guest stars: David Garth, Peter Bowles, Edward Brayshaw, George Murcell, Hamilton Dyce, Geraldine Moffat, David Calderisi and Steven Scott.
18	"A Memory of Evil"	Don Chaffey	Terry Nation and Dennis Spooner	Jan/Feb 1966	25 January 1967	113
Templeton-Green assigns Mannering to investigate how art treasures looted by the Nazis and believed lost are finding their way on to the market. Co-starring: Sue Lloyd and Colin Gordon. Guest stars: Robert Hardy, Ann Bell, Edwin Richfield, Frederick Bartmann, Jon Rollason, John Cazabon and John Tate.
19	"You Can't Win Them All"	Don Chaffey	Dennis Spooner	Apr 1966	1 February 1967	117
Discovering that Russian icons he had sold in good faith to a gallery have been substituted by fakes, The Baron attempts to secure the originals by playing the thief at his own game around a rigged poker table. Co-starring: Sue Lloyd. Guest stars: Sam Wanamaker, Peter Bowles, Reginald Marsh, David Burke, John Bown, Mark Dignam, Tony Caunter, John Cater, Edwin Brown and Ken Barker.
20	"The High Terrace"	Robert Asher	Dennis Spooner	Sep 1966	8 February 1967	128
Investigating the disappearance of a client and friend, Mannering uncovers a bizarre sect intent on defrauding its hapless followers. Co-starring: Sue Lloyd. Guest stars: Max Adrian, Jan Holden, John Collin and Veronica Hurst
21	"The Seven Eyes of Night"	Robert Asher	Terry Nation	Apr 1966	15 February 1967	118
The Baron is at the centre of an elaborate double-double-cross that revolves around the sale of the Seven Eyes of Night, a necklace once owned by the Empress Joséphine. Co-starring: Sue Lloyd. Guest stars: Jeremy Brett, Patricia English, Hilary Tindall, Christopher Benjamin and Arnold Diamond.
22	"Night of the Hunter"	Roy Baker	Terry Nation	Jul 1966	22 February 1967	124
Mannering and Cordelia arrive in a small Balkan state to broker an antiques deal with the widow of its former president, only to find she is on the run from the newly-installed dictator. Co-starring: Sue Lloyd. Guest stars: Derek Godfrey, Katherine Blake, Walter Gotell, Garfield Morgan, David Garfield, Clive Cazes, David Nettheim and Eric Mason.
23	"The Edge of Fear"	Quentin Lawrence	Dennis Spooner	May 1966	1 March 1967	120
After an audacious theft takes place, the Baron is compelled to act as authenticator in the attempted sale of the most famous painting in the world. Co-starring: Sue Lloyd. Guest stars: William Franklyn, Willoughby Goddard, Alan Wheatley, John Abineri, Gerald Sim and Barry Evans.
24	"Long Ago and Far Away"	Robert Asher	Dennis Spooner	Apr/May 1966	8 March 1967	116
When Cordelia goes missing on a routine assignment in South America, Mannering goes in search of her, only to uncover an attempted coup d'état by a deposed former president. Co-starring: Sue Lloyd. Guest stars: Barrie Ingham, Douglas Wilmer, Alex Scott, Paul Stassino, Eric Pohlmann, Michael Forrest, David Swift, Annette Carrell, Barry Linehan, Jonathan Elsom and Conrad Monk.
25	"So Dark the Night"	Robert Tronson	Terry Nation and Dennis Spooner	Jun 1966	15 March 1967	122
Mannering and Cordelia travel to the West Country to value an estate, and become embroiled in the hunt for the proceeds of a bank robbery that took place several years earlier. Co-starring: Sue Lloyd. Guest stars: Gillian Lewis, George Baker, John Franklyn-Robbins, Freddie Jones, John Garrie, Caroline Blakiston and Brown Derby.
26	"The Long, Long Day"	Roy Baker	Tony O'Grady (pseudonym of Brian Clemens)	Apr/May 1966	22 March 1967	119
Assigned to provide safe escort for a witness to a Mafia murder, the Baron is caught in a standoff with the killers in a lonely Italian hilltop village. Co-starring: Sue Lloyd. Guest stars: Peter Arne, Dalia Penn, Eddie Byrne, John Bluthal, Brian Rawlinson, John Bryans, Derrick Sherwin and Sue McIntosh.
27	"Roundabout"	Robert Tronson	Terry Nation	Aug/Sep 1966	29 March 1967	127
Mannering discovers that his Paris shop is being used as a front for drug trafficking. Guest stars: Annette Andre, June Ritchie, Lisa Daniely, Edwin Richfield, Norman Bird, Ewan Roberts, Victor Beaumont, Sandor Elès and Frederick Treves. (This episode does not feature any of the regular supporting cast.)
28	"The Man Outside"	Roy Baker	Terry Nation	Sep 1966	5 April 1967	129
Mannering visits Scotland after the death of one of his associates in a car accident. Things take a mysterious turn when he spots someone in a local pub wearing the antique ring Mannering had instructed his associate to buy. Co-starring: Sue Lloyd. Guest stars: David Bauer, Paul Maxwell, Michael Coles, Jeremy Burnham, Donald Douglas, John Ringham, Joseph Greig and Harry Littlewood.
29	"Countdown"	Robert Asher	Terry Nation	Oct 1966	12 April 1967	130
Mannering comes up against a rival antiques dealer when a long-lost antique sword resurfaces. However, only one of them plays by the rules. Co-starring: Sue Lloyd. Guest stars: Edward Woodward, Philip Locke, Harold Lang, Peter Brace, Les White, Valerie Leon and David King.
30	"Farewell to Yesterday"	Leslie Norman	Harry W Junkin	Oct 1965	19 April 1967	106
Templeton-Green assigns Mannering to uncover an art-smuggling operation which is seeing priceless treasures from the Vatican being couriered to London. An old flame of the Baron is also involved, and Mannering is as keen to rescue her as he is to solve the mystery. Co-starring: Colin Gordon and Paul Ferris. Guest stars: Sylvia Syms, William Sylvester, Victor Maddern, Clive Cazes and Arnold Diamond.

== DVD releases ==
The series was released by Network Video on Region 2 and by Umbrella Video (Australia) on Region 0 DVD. Commentaries were recorded by Sue Lloyd, Johnny Goodman and Cyril Frankel, among others. Entertainment One released the complete series on Region 1 DVD on 10 March 2009.
