= Syd Moore =

British novelist

- Born: Samantha Moore; Essex, England
- Education: City, University of London
- Occupations: Novelist, television presenter, activist
- Known for: Presenting Channel 4's literary programme Pulp
- Notable work: The Drowning Pool (2011), Witch Hunt (2012), Strange Magic (2017)

Syd Moore (born Samantha Moore) is a British bestselling novelist, former television presenter and activist. Her debut novel, The Drowning Pool, was published in 2011 by HarperCollins. Her novels are mystery thrillers inspired by her research into the myths from the English county of Essex, where she grew up and still lives.

== Life and career ==
Syd Moore was born in Essex, England. She lives near Southend, Essex. Moore is a writer of suspense and mystery fiction.

After graduating, Moore travelled through Europe, Asia and Australia before moving to London, where she lived for 13 years while working for the publishers Random House.

Between 1997 and 2001, Moore presented the Channel 4 literary programme Pulp, which she describes as "a crazy time during the ladism culture of the Nineties where there were a lot of strong women in the public eye".

Moore taught publishing at South Essex College, before studying for an MA in creative writing at City, University of London.

Moore was the founding editor of the Southend arts and culture magazine Level 4, launched in January 2008 to bring together the creative aspects of Southend and to give an account of the area where she lives.

Moore had been talking about and challenging the stereotype/archetype of the witch since the early 1990s and in 2008 finally put pen to paper to write her debut novel about the sea witch of Leigh on Sea, Sarah Moore. The Drowning Pool, was published in 2011 by HarperCollins.(and reissued in 2024 as The Witching Hour). Her follow up stand alone novel was Witch Hunt, which looked at Matthew Hopkins campaign of terror in Essex and East Anglia and focussed on the women accused.

For a long time Moore had wanted to create an Essex Witch Museum to commemorate the lives lost to the witch hunts and had applied for funding in 2010 to develop the idea. Her application did not succeed. However, not to be undone by this, Moore created the museum, as she says, ‘in a realm I did have some control over – fiction’. Strange Magic, the first of the Essex Witch Museum Mysteries, was published in 2017 and explored Moore’s hypothesis that the stereotype of the Essex Girl had its roots in the county’s dark episode of history – the witch trials. Five more novels (Strange Sight, Strange Fascination, Strange Tombs, Strange Tricks) and two collections of short stories followed (The Twelve Strange Days of Christmas, The Twelve Even Stranger Days of Christmas).

In 2024 Moore launched a new trilogy of books, the ‘Section W’ series. The novels investigate how the British secret service exploited the Nazi’s obsession with the occult. The Grand Illusion, set in England, was published in the April of that year. In 2025 The Great Deception, set in Iceland, continued the exploits of the protagonist Daphne Devine. ‘In a way,’ Maxim Jakubowski writes, ‘the series is becoming a kind of quirky parallel history, leading the reader to doubt versions of reality.’.

== Activism ==
Moore campaigns against the negative stereotyping of Essex girls, drawing comparisons between the witch hunts that feature in her novels and the prejudice that exists against "Essex girl" today. In 2017, she founded the "Essex Girls Liberation Front" (EGLF). Founder members include the Elsa James, Jo Farrugia and Sarah Mayhew. Their objective was to challenge the stereotype associated with the term "Essex Girl". After much campaigning, in 2020 the Oxford Learners Dictionary removed the definition from their dictionary.

In 2011, Moore and artist Heidi Wigmore teamed up to produce the tongue-in-cheek card game Super Strumps, to celebrate women and the positive attributes of female stereotypes.

Moore’s intention was to establish a commemorative walking route through Manningtree and Mistley in memory of the women executed during the 1645 witch trials. She worked with Metal in Southend to develop the idea but again funding was an issue. However in 2021 Moore was approached to collaborate with Snapping the Stiletto, a campaign for equality. She developed this idea with Kayleigh Boyle and worked with Alison Rowlands, Professor of History at the University of Essex, the artist Sian Fan, and twenty-two women local to Manningtree, to create an interactive walking trail around the town and out to Old Knobbley in Mistley. One woman who worked on this project was Gemma Garwood who went on to found the East Anglian Folklore Centre with Bethan Briggs-Miller.

Moore also created a Basildon ‘Witch’ Walk - an interactive walk in Basildon exploring the stories of women who had been persecuted for witchcraft in the borough and explaining how the witch hunts evolved.

In 2025 Moore and the EGLF collaborated with Blatella Films on a film about Moore’s theory concerning the Essex Girl stereotype and the Witch Hunts.

== Personal life ==
In her personal time, Moore spends her spare time with her son, and makes soap.

== Books ==
- The Drowning Pool (2011). Avon Books. ISBN 9781847562661
- Witch Hunt (2012). Avon, a division of HarperCollins Publishers Ltd. ISBN 9781847562692
- If on a Winter's Night a Traveller Passes By (2013). ASIN B00H9GMSEO
- Strange Magic: An Essex Witch Museum Mystery (2017). Oneworld Publications. ISBN 9781786070982
- Strange Sight (2017). Oneworld Publications. ISBN 9781786072054
- Strange Fascination (2018). Oneworld Publications. ISBN 9781786072573
- Strange Tombs (2019). Oneworld Publications. ISBN 9781786074485
- The Twelve Strange Days of Christmas (2019). Oneworld Publications. ISBN 9781786076809
- Strange Tricks(2021). Oneworld Publications.
- The Twelve Even Stranger Days of Christmas (2021). Oneworld Publications. ISBN 9781786079794
- The Grand Illusion - Book 1 in the Section W series - (2024) Oneworld Publications. ISBN 9780861541614
- The Witching Hour, previously The Drowning Pool (2024) Avon, a division of HarperCollins Publishers Ltd. ISBN 9781847562661
- The Great Deception- Book 2 in the Section W series - (2025) Oneworld Publications. ISBN 9780861549658
