= Johnny Goodman (TV producer) =

British television producer

Johnny Goodman (15 October 1927 – 30 January 2015) was a producer most active in independent British television from the 1960s-1980s. Since he left school at the age of 14 he worked in the film industry, mainly in feature film production, but in later years had typically been employed as a supervising producer of films for television. He was Chairman of BAFTA from 1987 to 1989. He was particularly associated with ITC Entertainment action-adventure shows like The Saint, The Persuaders!, and The Baron.
