= Witchfinder General (novel) =

1966 novel by Ronald Bassett

- First edition (publ. Barrie & Jenkins)
- Author: Ronald Bassett
- Language: English
- Publisher: Barrie & Jenkins
- Publication date: 1966

Witchfinder General is a 1966 horror novel written by Ronald Bassett. It tells the heavily fictionalized story of Matthew Hopkins, a notorious 17th-century witch-hunter.

According to historian Malcolm Gaskill, in Bassett's novel Hopkins is a 50-ish Ipswich lawyer "who becomes a pikeman in a parliamentarian regiment to escape his creditors, and from there reinvents himself as 'a black-winged Attila, leaving behind him a trail of gibbet-hung corpses'." Promoted as a horror novel, the back cover blurb of the book warned that the contents were "Not for those with delicate stomachs." The book served as the basis for Michael Reeves's violent and controversial 1968 film of the same name, also known as The Conqueror Worm.
