= Élisabeth Ercy =

French actress (born 1944)

- Born: 20 July 1944 (age 81); Dresden, Germany
- Occupation: Actress
- Years active: 1962–1968 (film)

Élisabeth Ercy (born 20 July 1944) is a German-born French actress. Making her film debut in Phaedra (1962) by Jules Dassin, she began a brief film career that included English-language roles, such as in the horror film The Sorcerers (1967). During the 1960s, she was in a relationship with actor Michael Caine. Her last role was in the Ken Russell television film, Song of Summer (1968), for the BBC.

== Filmography ==
- Phaedra (1962)
- The Victors (1963)
- Mort, où est ta victoire? (1964)
- Les Amoureux du France (1964)
- Sans merveille (1964)
- Marvelous Angelique (1965)
- Pas de caviar pour tante Olga (1965)
- Doctor in Clover (1966)
- The Sorcerers (1967)
- Fathom (1967)
- Song of Summer (1968)
