= Corn Exchange, Manningtree =

Commercial building in Manningtree, Essex, England

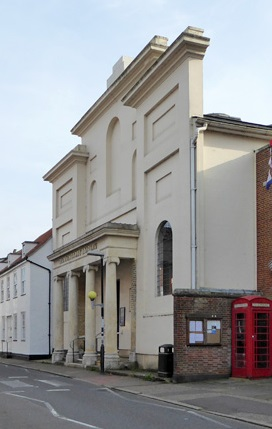
- Corn Exchange, Manningtree

- Shown in Essex
- 51.9453°N 1.0631°E
- Location: High Street, Manningtree

History
- Built: 1865

Site notes
- Architect: Frederick Barnes
- Architectural style: Neoclassical style

Listed Building – Grade II
- Official name: County Library
- Designated: 17 November 1966
- Reference no.: 1254192

The Corn Exchange is a commercial building in the High Street in Manningtree, Essex, England. The structure, which is now used as a public library, is a Grade II listed building.

== History ==
In the mid-19th century, a group of local businessmen decided to form a company, to be known as the "Manningtree Corn Exchange and Cattle Market Company", to finance and commission a purpose-built corn exchange for the town. The site they selected was on the south side of the High Street.

The building was designed by Frederick Barnes of Ipswich in the neoclassical style, built by George Hewitt also of Ipswich in white brick with a stucco finish at a cost of £1,600, and was officially opened on 31 August 1865. The design involved a symmetrical main frontage of three bays facing onto the High Street. The central bay, which was taller and slightly recessed, contained a tetrastyle portico formed by four Ionic order columns supporting an entablature and a cornice. On the first floor, there was a central round headed window, while the outer bays were fenestrated by round headed windows at ground floor level. All three bays were surmounted by parapets and cornices. Internally, the principal room was the main trading hall.

The use of the building as a corn exchange declined significantly in the wake of the Great Depression of British Agriculture in the late 19th century, and, from about 1900, it was used as a venue for public entertainment. In the early 1960s, Tending Rural District Council considered proposals for demolition of the building, but the Manningtree Society successfully campaigned for its retention. Instead, it was converted for use as a church for the trustees of the Roman Catholic Diocese of Brentwood, to a design by Raymond Erith, between 1966 and 1967.

In the mid-1980s, it was converted again, this time for use as a public library. The Manningtree and District Museum Local History Group secured a room in the building to display its collection to the public at that time. Items in the collection include local memorabilia and photographs.

== See also ==
- Corn exchanges in England
