= Witchfinder General (film) =

1968 British period horror film by Michael Reeves

- British quad poster
- Directed by: Michael Reeves
- Screenplay by: Tom Baker; Michael Reeves
- Based on: Witchfinder General (1966 novel) by Ronald Bassett
- Produced by: Louis M. Heyward; Philip Waddilove; Arnold Miller
- Starring: Vincent Price; Ian Ogilvy; Rupert Davies; Wilfrid Brambell; Patrick Wymark; Robert Russell; Nicky Henson; Hilary Dwyer
- Cinematography: John Coquillon
- Edited by: Howard Lanning
- Music by: Paul Ferris
- Production companies: Tigon British Film Productions; AIP-England, Ltd.
- Distributed by: Tigon Pictures
- Release date: 19 May 1968
- Running time: 86 minutes
- Country: United Kingdom
- Language: English
- Budget: £83,000
- Box office: $1.5 million (North American rentals)

Witchfinder General (titled onscreen as Matthew Hopkins: Witchfinder General) is a 1968 British period folk horror film directed by Michael Reeves and starring Vincent Price, Ian Ogilvy, Hilary Dwyer, Robert Russell, Rupert Davies, and Patrick Wymark. The screenplay, by Reeves and Tom Baker, (Note: Tom Baker was a childhood friend of Reeves who co-wrote Witchfinder General and The Sorcerers; he is not to be confused with Tom Baker, the Doctor Who actor.) was based on Ronald Bassett's 1966 novel.

The film is a heavily fictionalised account of the murderous witch-hunting exploits of Matthew Hopkins (Price), a lawyer who falsely claimed to have been appointed as a "Witch Finder Generall" [sic] by Parliament during the English Civil War to root out sorcery and witchcraft. The plot follows Roundhead soldier Richard Marshall (Ogilvy), who relentlessly pursues Hopkins and his assistant John Stearne (Russell) after they prey on his fiancée Sara (Dwyer) and execute her priestly uncle John Lowes (Davies).

Made on a low budget of under £100,000, the film was produced by Tigon British Film Productions. In the United States, where it was distributed by American International Pictures (AIP), Witchfinder General was retitled The Conqueror Worm (titled onscreen as Matthew Hopkins: Conqueror Worm) by AIP to link it with their earlier series of Edgar Allan Poe adaptations directed by Roger Corman and starring Price; because its narrative bears no relation to any of Poe's stories, American prints book-end the film with his poem "The Conqueror Worm" being read through Price's narration.

Witchfinder General eventually became a cult film, a development partially attributable to Reeves's death nine months after its release. Several prominent critics have championed the film, including Tim Lucas, J. Hoberman, Danny Peary, Robin Wood and Derek Malcolm; their praise has highlighted its direction, performances, and musical score by Paul Ferris.

== Plot ==
In 1645, during the English Civil War, Matthew Hopkins, an opportunistic witch hunter, takes advantage of the breakdown in social order to impose a reign of terror in East Anglia. Hopkins and his assistant, John Stearne, visit various villages to torture confessions out of suspected witches. They charge the local magistrates for the work they carry out.

Richard Marshall is a young Roundhead. After surviving a brief skirmish and killing his first enemy soldier (and thus saving the life of his Captain), he rides home to Brandeston, Suffolk, to visit his lover Sara, the niece of John Lowes, the village priest. Lowes gives his permission to Marshall to marry Sara, telling him there is trouble coming to the village, and he wants Sara far away before it arrives. Sara tells Marshall that they have been threatened and have become outcasts in their own village, and Marshall vows to protect her. At the end of his army leave, Marshall rides back to join his regiment and chances upon Hopkins and Stearne on the path. Marshall gives the two men directions to Brandeston, then rides on.

In Brandeston, Hopkins and Stearne immediately begin rounding up suspects. Lowes is accused at his home and tortured. He has needles stuck into his back (in an attempt to locate the so-called "Devil's Mark") and is about to be killed when Sara stops Hopkins by offering him sexual favours in exchange for her uncle's safety. Hopkins is called away to another village, and Stearne takes advantage of Hopkins's absence by raping Sara. Hopkins returns, discovers what Stearne has done, and refuses to interact with Sara. He instructs Stearne to begin torturing Lowes again. Shortly before departing the village, Hopkins and Stearne execute Lowes and two women.

Marshall returns to Brandeston and is horrified by what has happened to Sara, vowing to kill both Hopkins and Stearne. After "marrying" Sara in a ceremony of his own devising and instructing her to flee to Lavenham, he rides off by himself. In the meantime, Hopkins and Stearne have become separated after a Roundhead patrol attempts to commandeer their horses. Marshall locates Stearne, but after a brutal fight, Stearne is able to escape. He reunites with Hopkins and informs him of Marshall's desire for revenge.

Hopkins and Stearne enter the village of Lavenham. On a patrol to locate the King, Marshall learns they are there and quickly rides to the village with a group of his soldier friends; however, having earlier learned that Sara was in Lavenham, Hopkins has set a trap to capture Marshall. Hopkins and Stearne frame Marshall and Sara as witches and take them to the castle to be interrogated. Marshall watches as needles are repeatedly jabbed into Sara's back, but he refuses to confess to witchcraft, instead vowing again to kill Hopkins. He breaks free from his bonds and stamps on Stearne's face while his army comrades approach the castle dungeon. Marshall grabs an axe and repeatedly strikes Hopkins. The soldiers enter the room and are horrified to see what their friend has done. One of them, Marshall's friend Trooper Swallow, puts the mutilated but living Hopkins out of his misery by shooting him dead. Marshall's mind snaps, and he shouts, "You took him from me! You took him from me!" Sara, also apparently on the brink of insanity, screams uncontrollably over and over again.

== Cast ==
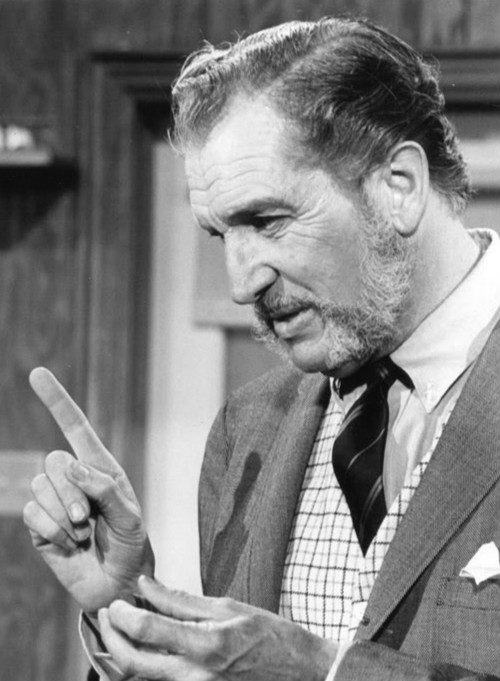
Vincent Price in 1968

- Vincent Price as Matthew Hopkins
- Ian Ogilvy as Cornet Richard Marshall
- Hilary Dwyer as Sara Lowes
- Rupert Davies as John Lowes
- Robert Russell as John Stearne
- Patrick Wymark as Oliver Cromwell
- Nicky Henson as Trooper Swallow
- Wilfrid Brambell as Master Loach
- Tony Selby as Salter
- Bernard Kay as Gore
- Godfrey James as Webb
- Michael Beint as Captain Gordon
- John Trenaman as Trooper Harcourt
- Bill Maxwell as Gifford
- Paul Ferris as Paul
- Maggie Kimberly as Elizabeth
- Margaret Nolan as Girl at Inn

== Historical background ==
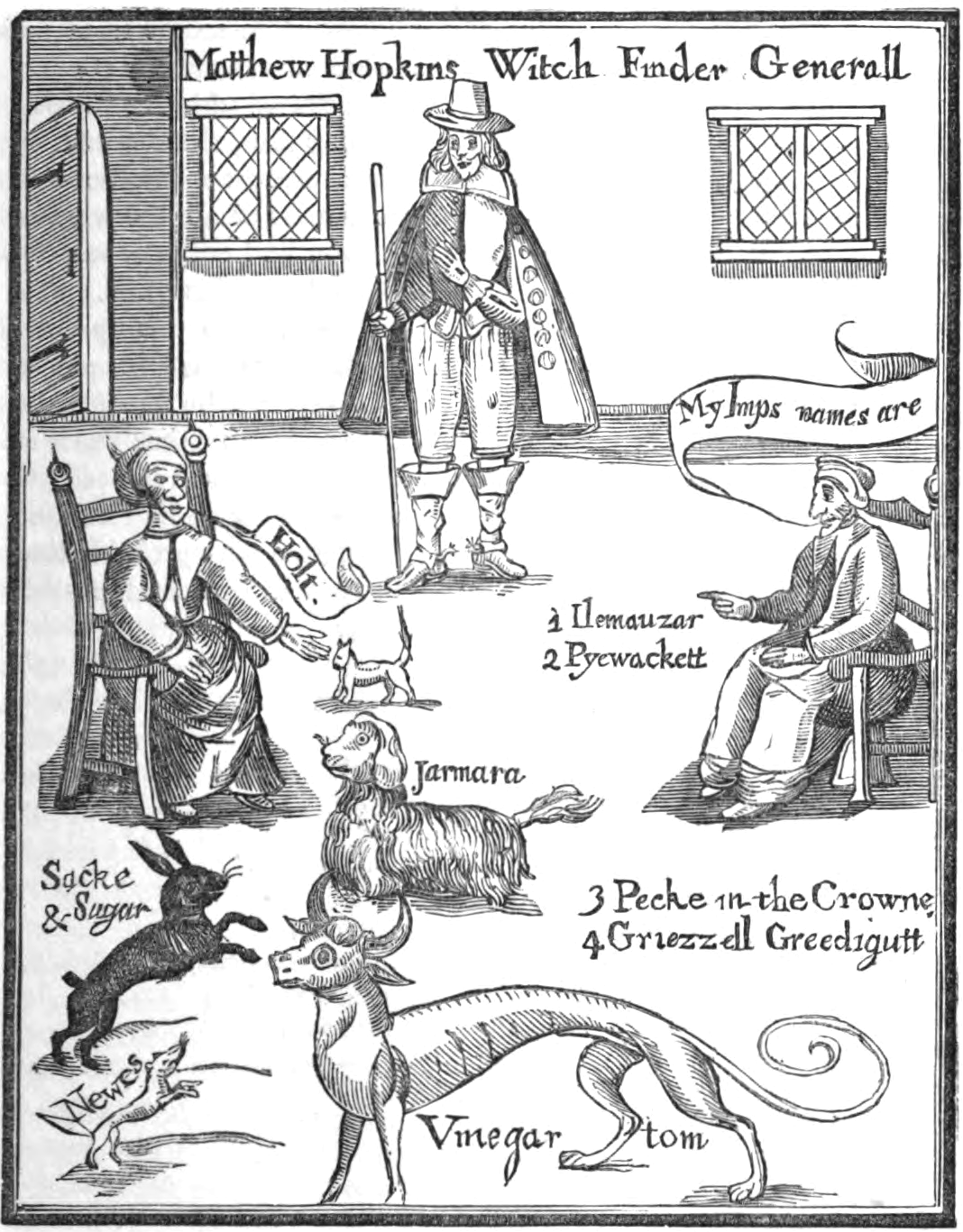
Matthew Hopkins confronting witches and their "imps"

From 1645 to 1647, Matthew Hopkins and John Stearne travelled the east of England as witch hunters. They harshly interrogated suspected witches (using methods such as sleep deprivation), examined them by pricking for a witch's mark, or sometimes threw an accused witch into water for a "swimming test". Local authorities paid for these services, plus expenses. Shortly before his death from consumption in 1647, Hopkins published The Discovery of Witches, his treatise on witch hunting. In one of its illustrations, he was labelled the "Witch Finder Generall".

== Production ==
=== Development and writing ===
Ronald Bassett's Witchfinder General, a novel loosely based on the historical Hopkins and Stearne, was published in 1966. Tony Tenser, the founder and chief executive of Tigon British Film Productions, read Bassett's book while it was still in galley form and purchased the film rights on impulse before publication. Tenser felt it "had some scope, had some breadth to it; there was canvas for a film".

Michael Reeves, who had just completed Tigon's The Sorcerers (1967) starring Boris Karloff, provided a story outline which met with Tenser's enthusiastic approval. Tenser immediately began putting together a preliminary budget, and requested that Reeves quickly complete a full film script, stressing to Reeves that the production would need to commence by September of that year to avoid shooting during cold weather. Reeves called in his childhood friend Tom Baker (who had co-written The Sorcerers with Reeves) to assist him with the script. Reeves and Baker began drafting a screenplay with Donald Pleasence firmly in mind as the film's star; however, once American International Pictures became involved in the production, they insisted that their contract star, Vincent Price, be given the lead, and Pleasence was dropped from the film. With the abrupt change of star, Reeves and Baker had to rethink their original concept of presenting Hopkins as "ineffective and inadequate ... a ridiculous authority figure", which they had believed Pleasence could perform effectively. They knew the tall, imposing Price, with his long history of horror roles, would have to be more of a straightforward villain, and they made changes to their script accordingly.

As was required by law for British film productions of that time, the completed first draft of the screenplay was presented by Tenser to the British Board of Film Censors (BBFC) on 4 August to determine if any possible censorship issues could be anticipated. On the same day, a preliminary report was issued by a BBFC examiner, who, commenting that Tenser was an "ape", referred to the screenplay as "perfectly beastly" and "ghoulish". The script was returned to Tenser a few days later, with a more detailed report from the same examiner, which described the screenplay as "a study in sadism in which every detail of cruelty and suffering is lovingly dwelt on". After a second draft was written and sent to the BBFC only eleven days after the first draft, the reaction was nearly the same. It was returned to Tenser with a long list of requirements to reduce the film's possible offensiveness.

Reeves and Baker completed a third and final draft that was "substantially toned down" in content from the previous attempts. This version of the screenplay, which was further revised during production, was missing many of the more explicit moments of violence described in the first submitted drafts: the death spasms of the pre-credits hanging victim, Lowes getting stabbed fifteen times with a steel spike, and a sniper's victim somersaulting through the air and slamming into a tree. A sequence depicting the Battle of Naseby was to be filmed, during which a soldier's head was to be cut off on screen. Most significantly, the film's finale was completely altered. In the original ending, Stearne falls in with a group of gypsies and attempts to rape one of their women, who successfully fights off her attacker by plunging her thumbs into his eyes, blinding him. The gypsies then stake him to death. Marshall arrives and convinces the gypsies to assist him in ambushing Hopkins. Hopkins is viciously beaten by Marshall, who forces a "confession" out of the bloodied man. Marshall partially drowns Hopkins (whose thumbs have been tied to his feet), then finally hangs him. Tenser had previously expressed concerns regarding the scope of the Battle of Naseby sequence as well as the gypsy-ending, as these scenes would both require the employment of additional groups of extras. He asked Reeves and Baker to remove the battle sequence and simplify the ending for the final draft.

=== Casting ===
Price was not Reeves' choice to play Hopkins; this was the veteran horror star's 75th film and his 17th for American International Pictures. The role was a great challenge for Price, as his frequent clashes with Reeves left him unsure as to what the director wanted. Despite this, Price felt he delivered "one of the best performances I've ever given".

Ogilvy and Reeves had been friends since they were teenagers, and the actor had appeared in many of the director's amateur short films. Ogilvy had also starred in both of Reeves' two previous feature films, The She Beast and The Sorcerers, and was the first choice for the role of Witchfinder's lead. Describing his working relationship with Reeves, Ogilvy observed that "his mastery of the technical aspects was absolute", but added "Mike never directed the actors. He always said he knew nothing about acting, and preferred to leave it up to us." Ogilvy enjoyed working with Price, finding him to be "very funny, in a 'queeny' sort of way."

Witchfinder was Dwyer's debut feature film. With three years of television work behind her, she had been noticed by Tenser and put under contract with Tigon at the age of 21. She felt Reeves was "just wonderful ... He was really inspiring to work with. And because it was my first film I didn't know how lucky I was." She would go on to make several more horror films for AIP, most of them co-starring Price, before leaving acting in the late 1970s to become a producer.

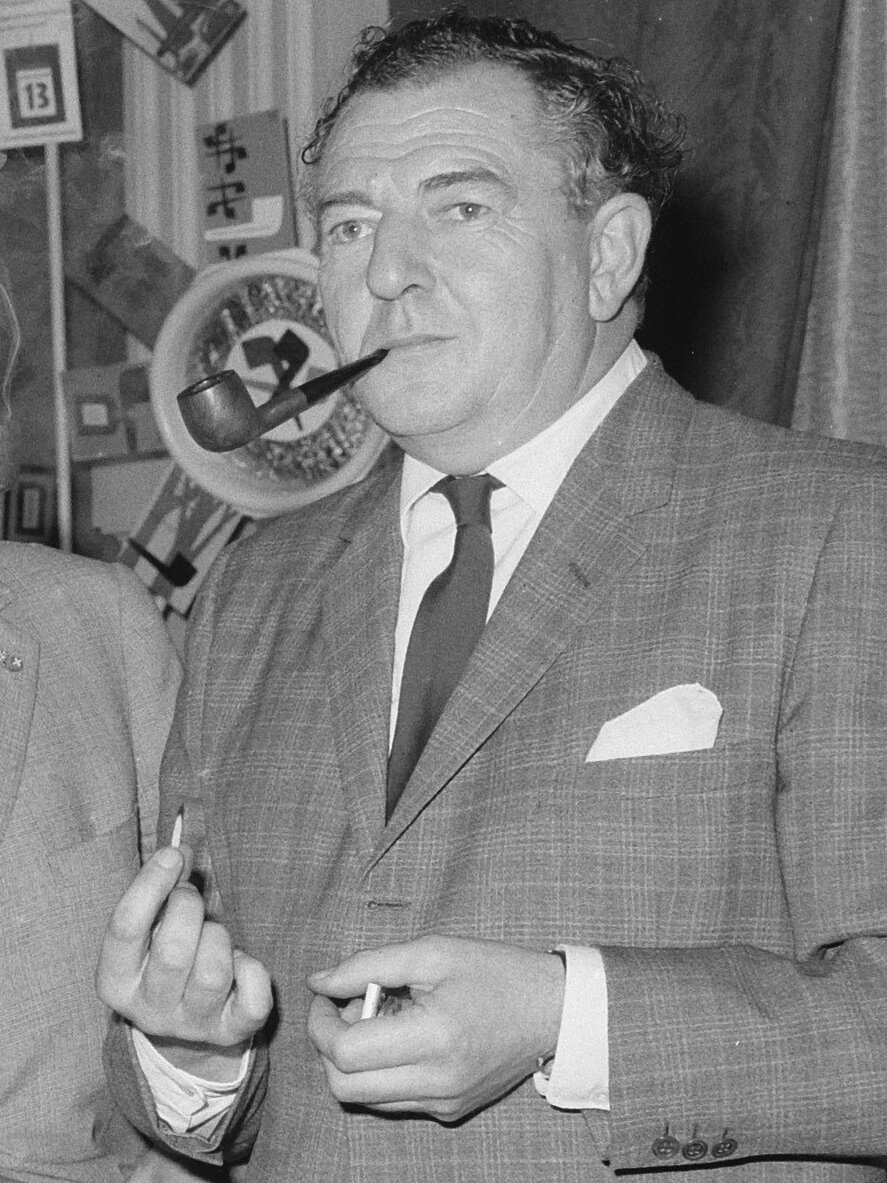
Rupert Davies in 1966

Appearing as Dwyer's uncle, Witchfinder was one of several horror films the British character actor Rupert Davies performed in during the later stage of his career. Davies was not pleased when he discovered that the filming of his torture scenes was to be augmented with live rats placed on his body. The actor recalled Reeves instructing him, "Don't move! Wait until one of them starts nibbling your jaw then you might move your head a little."

An often-reported anecdote states that Reeves found Russell's high-pitched voice unsuitable for such a rough character, and had all of his dialogue dubbed by Bernard Kay (who also played the fisherman); however, Bill Kelley doubts this story, noting that Russell's voice in Inspector Clouseau is similar to that which appears in Witchfinder.

=== Filming ===
Production began on 18 September 1967 with a budget of £83,000. AIP contributed £32,000, with £12,000 for Price's expenditures and fees, and £20,000 for production costs. Philip Waddilove, a former BBC radio and record producer, contributed £5,000 in return for associate producer billing. Although the film would be the biggest-budgeted title in Tigon's history, AIP's costs represented a relatively small expenditure. AIP heads Samuel Z. Arkoff and James H. Nicholson did not expect a high quality result; the movie was intended to be a tax write-off.

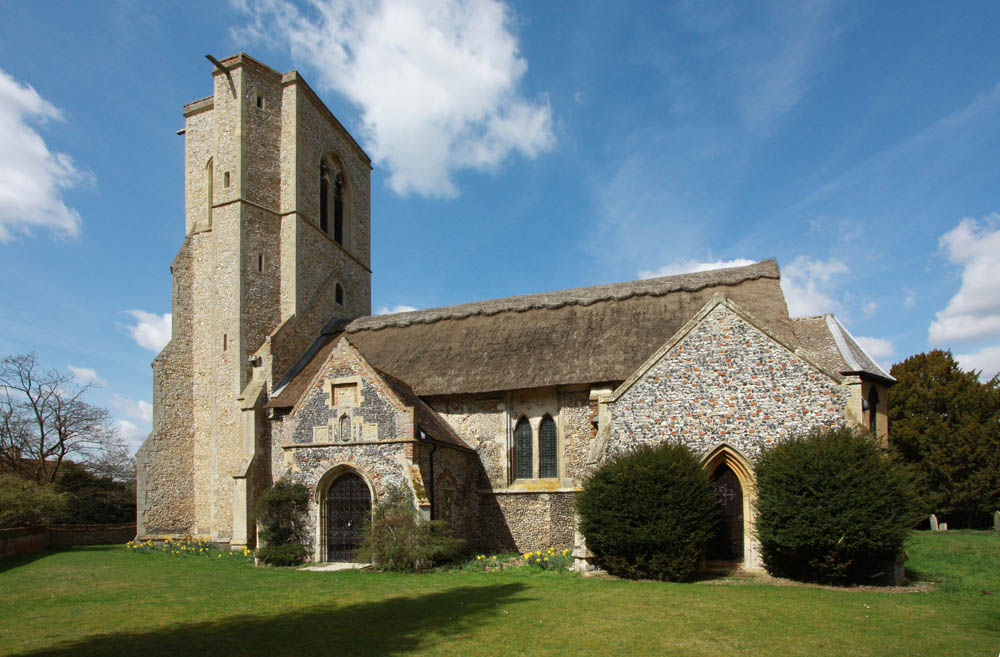
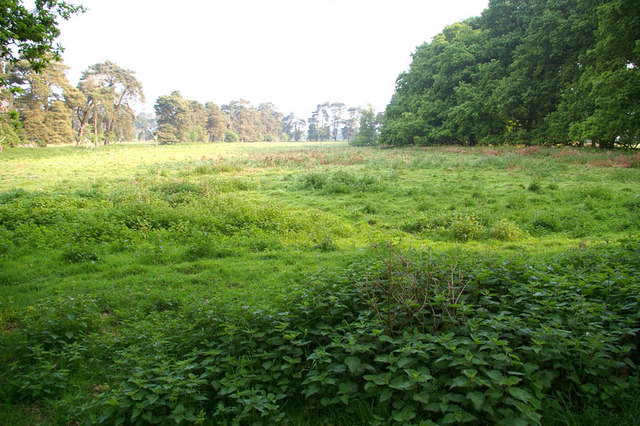
Shooting was done at locations around East Anglia, including the St John the Evangelist church in Rushford, Norfolk, and the Stanford Battle Area.

The interiors were filmed in two specially converted aircraft hangars near Bury St. Edmunds in Suffolk, which were leased for £1,500; this cost-measure resulted in much of the dialogue having to be re-recorded later, because the tin roofs of the hangars caused an echo. The exterior shots range from the Dunwich Coast (for the scene with the fisherman) to Langley Park outside London (for the scene where Stearne escapes capture). The tracking shot of the ambush after the opening credits was filmed at Black Park in southeast Buckinghamshire, a location frequently used by Hammer Film Productions. Lavenham Square (in Lavenham, Suffolk), site of the witch-burning scene, was the real Lavenham Market Square; the crew lowered TV antennas and telephone wires and Waddilove hired a cherry picker from a local utility company for £10, because the unit could not afford a camera crane. The countryside vistas seen in the chase scenes on horseback were shot on the Stanford Battle Area near Thetford, Norfolk—the producer, through connections with the government, was able to lease parts of the area. The church used in the film is St John The Evangelist in Rushford, Norfolk. The moat drowning and hanging scenes were filmed at Kentwell Hall, in Long Melford. The climax of the film was shot at Orford Castle, on the coast of East Anglia. Filming wrapped as scheduled on 13 November 1967.

The production went relatively smoothly except for the unrelentingly antagonistic relationship that developed between Reeves and Price. Reeves told everyone associated with the production that the American actor was not his choice for the role, and the director's comments had reached the actor back in the US. Reeves refused the courtesy of meeting Price at Heathrow Airport when he arrived in England, a "deliberate snub calculated to offend both Price and AIP". "Take me to your goddamn young genius", Price reportedly said to co-producer Philip Waddilove, who greeted the actor at the airport instead of Reeves. When Price went on location and met Reeves for the first time, the young director told the actor, "I didn't want you, and I still don't want you, but I'm stuck with you!"

According to Kim Newman in his book, Nightmare Movies, when Reeves made a suggestion on the set, Price objected and told the director: "I've made 87 [sic] films. What have you done?" And Reeves responded: "I've made three good ones." Price later recalled that this was one of the first movies where he clashed with the director. Price felt that all the actors on the set had a difficult time with the director, who Price believed did not understand how to give instructions to actors.

In one scene, Reeves needed Price to shoot his flintlock between the ears of the horse he was riding. When Price realised that Reeves had ordered that an actual blank charge was to be used so the weapon's puff of smoke would be visible, he shouted, "What? You want the gun to go bang between the ears of this fucking nag? How do you think he's going to react?"; however, Reeves insisted and, when the gun went off, the horse reared and sent Price tumbling onto the ground. Price was not hurt but he was extremely angered by the incident.

On the final day of shooting, Price showed up on the set visibly intoxicated. Reeves seethed to Waddilove, "He's drunk—how dare he be drunk on my set! I'll kill the bastard." Waddilove soon discovered that Reeves planned to inflict painful revenge on the actor. During preparations for Price's violent death scene, the director was overheard instructing Ogilvy to "really lay into Vincent" with the stage axe. When the scene was filmed, Ogilvy responded with blows that were not faked, but Waddilove had fitted Price's costume with padding, protecting the actor from injury.

Despite the tension between the two men during the production, when Price saw the film the following year, he admitted that he understood Reeves's artistic vision and wrote the young director a ten-page letter praising the film. Reeves wrote Price back, "I knew you would think so." Years after Reeves's death, Price said, "I realised what he wanted was a low-key, very laid-back, menacing performance. He did get it, but I was fighting him almost every step of the way. Had I known what he wanted, I would have cooperated."

Reeves also had to deal with other problems during the shooting. On the first day, Price was thrown from his horse and sent back to his hotel to recover. The actor returned to work the following day. Towards the end of filming, a strike was called when the British technicians union learned the production company was not hiring a large enough crew as required by union rules. After an extra man was hired, the crew resumed working. On two occasions, Reeves was short of actors. Waddilove replaced an absent actor as a Roundhead officer during Wymark's one-day scene. Waddilove's wife, Susi, played one of the women in the animal enclosure during the witch-burning sequence.

The film's violent ending deviated from the script due to a continuity problem. In the scene as written, Trooper Swallow was supposed to use both his and Harcourt's flintlock pistols to shoot both Hopkins and Richard dead; however, only Harcourt was depicted in previous scenes as carrying a pistol, and therefore only one person could be shot. When this plot hole was discovered, Reeves immediately told actor Nicky Henson, "All right, just shoot Vincent and I'll get Ian to scream and shout and go mad and freeze frame on Hilary Dwyer screaming".

Several additional nude scenes were filmed during the production. Set in a pub and involving local "wenches", the sequences were reportedly solely intended for the film's German release version. Reeves refused to take part in the filming of these sequences and they were completed by the crew after the initial versions of the scenes had been shot, with Tigon's Tenser acting as director. According to Waddilove, Louis M. Heyward, AIP's head of European productions, appeared at the location only to ensure those additional scenes were filmed. The credits read, "Additional scenes by Louis M Heyward". According to Ogilvy, this was an in-joke because for Reeves, "additional scenes" meant "some prick of a producer putting his oar in and messing up what the director had done".

== Music ==
Witchfinder General

Soundtrack album by Paul Ferris
- Released: 24 November 2013
- Recorded: Olympic Studios, February 1968
- Genres: Film score, contemporary classical
- Length: 50:00
- Label: De Wolfe Music

Witchfinder General's score was composed by Reeves's friend Paul Ferris, who had previously scored The Sorcerers, and acted in the film under the alias "Morris Jar" (a reference to his favourite composer, Maurice Jarre). He drew inspiration from the folk song "Greensleeves" in writing the romantic theme "Peaceful Interlude" as a means of evoking its time period, as well as to serve as a counterpoint to the film's violence. Film critic Tim Lucas compared the score to Marcello Giombini's music for the swashbuckler film Knives of the Avenger, saying that each film is a "historical melodrama that functions as a metaphoric Western".

Ferris's ambitions clashed with Tenser; the composer hoped to have the score performed with traditional Elizabethan instruments, a creative choice that Tenser vetoed for budgetary reasons. He instead conducted a 55-piece orchestra with whom he recorded at Olympic Studios in February 1968; he paid most of the performers' wages with his own money when Tenser refused to sanction additional funds, although he was later reimbursed after Tenser was impressed with his efforts. Ferris sold the publishing and master rights for the soundtrack to De Wolfe Music, who incorporated it into their large library of stock music and released the score, alongside Peter Knight's music for the Tigon/AIP film Curse of the Crimson Altar, on their album Strange Location, credited to the "London Studio Orchestra". De Wolfe eventually released an official soundtrack album in 2013; the CD release includes a 12-page booklet containing stills from the film and liner notes by Tenser biographer John Hamilton.

== Themes and genre ==
In a piece written for the British Film Institute commemorating the 50th anniversary of Witchfinder General's original release, Adam Scovell identified "weaponised belief"—represented by Hopkins's exploitation of the irrationalities and superstitions of the populace as a means of gaining power and fulfilling his sexual and political ambitions—as the film's primary thematic concern, stating that "belief doesn't create [his] sword, but it most definitely sharpens it". He also describes the use of "pastoral violence", whereby the beauty of the English countryside is juxtaposed with acts of extreme violence, notably in the opening scene depicting the hanging of a condemned witch.

Writing for Cine Outsider, Jerry Whyte believes that the film "brilliantly recreates that sense of social collapse" and its commentary has merit in critiquing the policies of historical witch-hunts, which would have resonated with contemporary audiences in the light of McCarthyism and the Vietnam War. Expanding on Iain Sinclair's assertion that, "The film's success lies in the tension between [Tom] Baker's Utopian permissiveness, his feel for the country, and Reeves' demonic fatalism", Whyte describes Witchfinder as an "English Western". Noting Reeves' long-standing interest in the genre, he identifies the film's various connections to it, including its frequent horse-riding sequences, clear distinctions between good and evil, and Marshall's pursuit of revenge against Hopkins. Responding to David Pirie's acclamation of the film as "One of the most personal and mature statements in the history of British Cinema", Whyte also considers the film to be one of the few fictionalised portrayals of the English Civil War to feature a serious, positive depiction of the New Model Army and the Good Old Cause compared to such films as Cromwell (1970) and To Kill a King (2003), which he described as "detached travesties of truth, mere hagiographies of Cromwell, that lack the vim, vision, intensity and invention of Reeves' low-budget, improvised gem".

Witchfinder General is commonly cited as an example of the subgenre of folk horror and is often grouped with The Blood on Satan's Claw (1971) and The Wicker Man (1973) as definitive works of the genre. This association was popularized by Mark Gatiss in the 2010 documentary series A History of Horror, and is expanded on in later works such as Adam Scovell's 2017 book Folk Horror: Hours Dreadful and Things Strange and Kier-La Janisse's 2021 documentary Woodlands Dark and Days Bewitched: A History of Folk Horror. Scovell connects these films to folk horror because in all three, characters are physically and/or socially isolated in a rural landscape where they confront hostile belief systems.

Biographer Benjamin Halligan suggests that the film is a pinnacle in Reeves's evolution as a filmmaker, with The She Beast representing a straightforward approach to the trappings of the horror genre, The Sorcerers acting as an allegorical commentary on cinema itself, and Witchfinder serving as a work that transcends genre fiction by using its conventions to create "something different altogether".

== Release ==
=== Censorship ===
For its time, Witchfinder General was considered an unusually sadistic film. British film censor John Trevelyan was reportedly a distant cousin of Michael Reeves and accepted the director's good intentions when Reeves explained why he felt it was necessary to include such intense violence in the movie. Trevelyan nonetheless argued, "The film gave the impression that it was exploiting violence, and in particular, sadism for commercial reasons." Reeves agreed to make some of the initial minor cuts himself, but when additional and more extensive demands were made he adamantly refused to take part in any further editing.

Trevelyan claimed that Reeves later wrote him a letter admitting that the cuts were not as harmful as he had expected. No copy of the letter has ever surfaced, and based on several other comments the director subsequently made about how the edits "ruined the film", Reeves's biographer Benjamin Halligan believes Trevelyan may have somehow "misremembered" the existence of this letter, confusing it with an earlier missive from the director in which he made a plea for the BBFC's leniency.

=== UK reception ===
The truncated version received considerable controversy from UK film critics for the amount of violence shown on screen. In The Sunday Times, Dilys Powell emphasised the "hanging, burning, raping, [and] screaming" and called the film "Peculiarly nauseating." Both The Guardian and Margaret Hinxman of The Sunday Telegraph felt the film was filled with extravagant sadism. The Monthly Film Bulletin said: "Not since Peeping Tom has a film aroused such an outcry about nastiness and gratuitous violence as this one". The pacing of the film was criticised by playwright Alan Bennett, who stated that there were no funny moments to offset the horror. Although initially infuriated with Bennett's critique, Reeves later indicated that Bennett's reaction confirmed his decision to incorporate extreme violence in the film.

Several critics praised the film and its horror elements. John Russell Taylor in the Times Saturday Review praised Reeves, stating "He already has real achievements behind him: not merely good horror films, but good films, period." Films and Filming praised Price's performance as Hopkins and stated that the film was horrifying.

=== US reception ===
AIP heads Arkoff and Nicholson originally contributed their portion of the budget as a tax write-off, but when they were screened the completed film they were astonished by its quality. Arkoff noted that "Michael Reeves brought out some element in Vincent that hadn't been seen in a long time."

In the US, the film was not subject to any censorship and released to AIP's usual mix of drive-ins and grindhouses on a double bill with The Young, the Evil and the Savage. In an attempt to link the film with Roger Corman's earlier Edgar Allan Poe series of films, it was retitled The Conqueror Worm. Brief prologue and epilogue narrations by Price, taken from Poe's poem, were added to justify the new title. The film went nearly unnoticed by critics during its US release.

Some reviewers criticised the film's script and high level of violence. While Variety praised Dwyer's performance, they felt it was "hampered by Michael Reeves's mediocre script and ordinary direction". Renata Adler also praised the acting in The New York Times. Despite the lack of critical support, the film was a modest success in the United States, earning $1.5 million for AIP according to Cinefantastique magazine. In his biography of Reeves, Benjamin Halligan claims the film made $10 million in the US.

=== Reassessment ===
After its initial release in the spring of 1968, several critics began championing the film in the UK and US. Critics praised the film as Reeves's best work, and highlighted the film's pacing. Critics positively highlighted the English countryside as the setting and the performances by the actors. In 2000, Derek Malcolm included Witchfinder General as part of his series The Century of Films, a list of what he considered to be the one hundred most "artistically or culturally important" films of the 20th Century. In 2005, the magazine Total Film named Witchfinder General the 15th-greatest horror film of all time. The film has obtained cult status, which J. Hoberman of The Village Voice attributed to the death of its director before the film's release, the actors' performances, and the depiction of evil acts by political figures, which resonated with audiences.

A contrary assessment came from Alex Cox, who in his introduction to the film in a 1992 episode of BBC2's Moviedrome, praised Price's performance as being "untroubled" by his American accent, but otherwise described the film as a "fairly routine Price horror film". He also stated that the film's violence was tame compared to the Friday the 13th and A Nightmare on Elm Street films.

While some reviewers have praised the film for its historical accuracy, others have questioned its adherence to historical fact. Malcolm Gaskill, fellow and former Director of Studies in history at Churchill College, Cambridge, critiqued the film as "a travesty of historical truth" and stated that the only historically accurate facts in the film were that Hopkins and his assistant tortured, tried, and hanged John Lowes, the vicar of Brandeston. Based on its historical accuracy Gaskill rated the film 3/10.

== Legacy and influence ==
Witchfinder General inspired American International Pictures to produce more movies linked to Edgar Allan Poe, including The Oblong Box (linked to Poe's story "The Premature Burial") and Cry of the Banshee (very loosely linked to Poe's poem "The Bells"). The Oblong Box starred Price and was originally scheduled to be directed by Reeves, but was given to Gordon Hessler after Reeves quit a week prior to production. Hessler also directed Cry of the Banshee, which featured Price and Dwyer. It was derivative of Witchfinder General, but it portrayed the witches as real and contained more explicit sexual violence.

Tigon followed up on Witchfinder General by modifying the story for its 1971 release Blood on Satan's Claw; the setting was moved from the Victorian era to the 18th century, and other elements were added to make it more similar to Witchfinder.

Witchfinder General was popular in Germany and inspired new films in the same genre. Similar films fully or partially financed by German production companies included Mark of the Devil, The Bloody Judge and Hexen geschändet und zu Tode gequält, released in the U.S. as Mark of the Devil Part II.

Film scholar Ian Cooper has argued that the influence of Witchfinder General extended beyond the cycle of witch-hunting films that followed it. He identified the film as an early example of the increasingly graphic violence of the late 1960s and early 1970s, and argued that its nihilism and brutality anticipated the direction taken by British horror during the following decade.

Some critics have suggested that Ken Russell's The Devils was influenced by Reeves's film; however, Russell said that he hated Reeves's film, describing it as "one of the worst movies I have ever seen and certainly the most nauseous".

The film has also influenced heavy metal music. English doom metal band Witchfinder General took their name from the film. English doom metal band Cathedral drew on the film for their song "Hopkins (The Witchfinder General)", which samples Vincent Price's dialogue from the film. Witchfinder General was the inspiration for a BBC Radio 4 play Vincent Price and The Horror of The English Blood Beast, first broadcast in March 2010.

In 2016, director Nicolas Winding Refn and distributor Rupert Preston obtained the remake rights to Witchfinder General. In 2019, John Hillcoat was announced as the director for the remake.

== Home video versions ==
The "Export Version", which contained both the previously cut violence and alternative shots of topless nudity filmed for overseas release, was passed uncut by the BBFC in 1995, and released on VHS by Redemption. In 2001, a DVD was released in the UK by Metrodome consisting of two versions, the complete "Director's Cut" containing the two minutes of previously censored violence, and the aforementioned "Export Version", with the violence intact and shots of nudity added to certain sequences. In both versions, the two minutes of violence have been taken from what has been described as "a grainy VHS source". Some critics complained that watching the film in this manner was "jarring" or "distracting". The soundtrack of the newly inserted nude shots had "brief snippets of audio repeating itself because of the timing involved in inserting the previously cut footage".

In the US, while censorship of the film has never been a factor, the film experienced numerous delays in appearing on home video in its originally intended form. When Orion Pictures acquired the rights to many of AIP's titles in the 1980s, they were unwilling to also purchase rights to the musical soundtracks of some of the films, including Witchfinder General, and replaced the original music with synthesizer scores by composer Kendall Schmidt. Tim Lucas described Schmidt's rescoring as a "betrayal to every effort the original film made to remain true to its time frame". For years, Ferris's original score was not available in the US on home video releases, although it was included on theatrical and syndicated television prints. The HBO videotape release from the late 1980s used the Orion version, which also included the nude inserts. Lucas says that the spoken soundtrack is not correctly matched to these newly added shots.

A restored version was released on DVD under the Midnite Movies banner on 11 September 2007 by 20th Century Fox Home Entertainment. The release includes the complete, uncut version of the film with the Ferris score intact. Price's opening and closing narration tacked on to the AIP Conqueror Worm version, as well as the alternate nude sequences, were not available on this release, but were included in the UK Blu-ray release from Odeon Entertainment issued in June 2011. The Blu-ray utilised the same high-definition transfer as the 2007 MGM DVD and was completely uncut. Scream Factory included the film as part of the company's multi-title Vincent Price Blu-ray box set released in fall of 2013.

== See also ==
- List of cult films
- List of films about witchcraft
