= John Karlsen =

New Zealand actor (1919–2017)

- Born: Charles John Karlsen; 20 October 1919; Pacific Ocean
- Died: 5 July 2017 (aged 97); Auckland, New Zealand
- Other names: John Carlsen; Charles John Karlsen; John Karlson
- Occupations: Actor; voice actor
- Years active: 1958-2007

Charles John Karlsen (20 October 1919 – 5 July 2017) was a New Zealand actor and voice actor, who worked predominantly in Italian cinema. He appeared in over 80 film and television productions between 1958 and 2003.

== Early life ==
Karlsen was born in 1919, aboard a passenger ship between London and Singapore, and was raised in Australia and Wellington, New Zealand. He moved to Britain to study drama, and later started his own repertory company.

== Career ==
Karlsen moved to Rome in the 1950s, where he ran the “Crypt Theatre” beneath St. Paul's Within the Walls Church. He appeared in some 88 films and television productions between 1958 and 2003, mainly in Italy. He made his film debut in the 1958 Mamie Van Doren comedy The Beautiful Legs of Sabrina. He worked with some of the most significant directors in Italian cinema, most notably Federico Fellini. He was also active in English-language dubbing.

Karlsen also appeared in several Hollywood productions shot in Italy, including Francis of Assisi (1961), Cleopatra (1963), The Black Stallion (1979), and The Sin Eater (2003). He had a small but memorable role as the Evil Duke in Bill & Ted's Excellent Adventure (1989). A 2004 Wanted in Rome article called him a "Hero of Hollywood on the Tiber." His last acting role was Pupi Avati's The Hideout (2007), after which he retired to New Zealand.

== Death ==
Karlsen died on 5 July 2017 in Auckland, at the age of 97.

== Selected filmography ==
- The Beautiful Legs of Sabrina (1958) as The Security Guard at Jeweller's Shop (uncredited)
- The Naked Maja (1958) as Inquisitor
- Francis of Assisi (1961) as Friar (uncredited)
- Battle of the Worlds (1961) as United Commission Leader (uncredited)
- Werewolf in a Girls' Dormitory (1961) as Old Man
- A Difficult Life (1961) as Smoking University Professor (uncredited)
- Pontius Pilate (1962) as Roman Senator
- The Witch's Curse (1962) as Burgomeister
- It Happened in Athens (1962) as King of Greece (uncredited)
- Toto and Peppino Divided in Berlin (1962) as Nazist (uncredited)
- The Seventh Sword (1962) as The Old Actor (uncredited)
- 8½ (1963) as Un uomo in auto (uncredited)
- Cleopatra (1963) as High Priest (uncredited)
- Il Boom (1963) as Occulist
- Crypt of the Vampire (1964) as Franz Karnstein
- Un commerce tranquille (1964) as Priest
- Le bambole (1965) as Husband (segment "La minestra")
- Crack in the World (1965) as Dr. Reynolds
- Two Mafiosi Against Goldfinger (1965) as Stevenson
- Me, Me, Me... and the Others (1966) as Producer
- The She Beast (1966) as Count Von Helsing
- Modesty Blaise (1966) as Oleg
- Agent 3S3: Massacre in the Sun (1966) as Tereczkov's Boss
- Our Men in Bagdad (1966) as Botschafter
- El Greco (1966) as Prosecutor
- Requiem for a Secret Agent (1966) as Franco
- The Christmas That Almost Wasn't (1966) as Blossom
- Mission Stardust (1967) as Crest
- Face to Face (1967) as University Dean (uncredited)
- I barbieri di Sicilia (1967) as German Chemist (uncredited)
- Your Turn to Die (1967) as Photographer in Nightclub (uncredited)
- L'oro di Londra (1968) as Ed
- Phenomenal and the Treasure of Tutankhamen (1968) as Prof. Micklewitz
- Spirits of the Dead (1968) as Schoolmaster in Yard (segment "William Wilson") (uncredited)
- Galileo (1968)
- I See Naked (1969) as Psychiatrist (uncredited)
- Carnal Circuit (1969) as Fletcher (uncredited)
- Fellini Satyricon (1969) as Man in Litter (uncredited)
- Juliette de Sade (1969) as The Marchese
- Tre nel mille (1971)
- Stanza 17-17 palazzo delle tasse, ufficio imposte (1971) as Strongbox Seller (uncredited)
- Slaughter Hotel (1971) as Professor Osterman
- What? (1972) as Man-Servant Edward (uncredited)
- Polvere di stelle (1973) as German Commander (uncredited)
- The Kiss (1974) as Friedrich (uncredited)
- Footprints on the Moon (1975) as Alfred Lowenthal
- Prete, fai un miracolo (1975) as vescovo Ritter
- The Messiah (1975) as Caiaphas
- Fellini's Casanova (1976) as Lord Talou
- The New Godfathers (1979)
- The Black Stallion (1979) as Archaeologist
- The Warning (1980) as Ferdinando Violante
- Pronto... Lucia (1982)
- Good King Dagobert (1984) as Corbus
- Detective School Dropouts (1986) as Museum Guide
- I Love N.Y. (1987) as the Butler
- Devils of Monza (1987) as Don Carlo
- Stradivari (1988) as Grand Chamberlain
- The Little Devil (1988) as Anziano monsignore
- The Gamble (1988)
- Bill & Ted's Excellent Adventure (1989) as Evil Duke
- The Church (1989) as Heinrich
- Frankenstein Unbound (1990) as Parson
- Stasera a casa di Alice (1990) as Il suocero
- Count Max (1991) as Il maggiordomo
- Killer Rules (1993, TV Movie) as Lord Elston
- E.T.A. Hoffmanns Der Sandmann (1993) as Spalanzini
- Caro dolce amore (a.k.a. Honey Sweet Love...) (1994) as Sir John Atherton
- Screw Loose (1999) as Dr. Caputo
- The Sin Eater (2003) (a.k.a. The Order) as Eden's Manservant
- The Hideout (2007) (final film role)
