= The Sorcerers =

1967 film by Michael Reeves

- US film poster
- Directed by: Michael Reeves
- Screenplay by: Michael Reeves; Tom Baker
- Story by: John Burke
- Produced by: Patrick Curtis; Tony Tenser
- Starring: Boris Karloff; Elizabeth Ercy; Ian Ogilvy; Victor Henry; Catherine Lacey
- Cinematography: Stanley A. Long
- Edited by: David Woodward; Susan Michie
- Music by: Paul Ferris
- Production companies: Tony Tenser Films; Curtwel Productions; Global Films
- Distributed by: Tigon Pictures (UK)
- Release date: June 15, 1967 (London)
- Running time: 82 minutes
- Country: United Kingdom
- Language: English
- Budget: £50,000

The Sorcerers is a 1967 British science-fiction horror film directed by Michael Reeves, starring Boris Karloff, Catherine Lacey, Ian Ogilvy, and Susan George. The film is about an elderly couple (Karloff and Lacey) who use a device to control and feel the experiences of a younger man (Ogilvy), but the wife's intentions become increasingly aggressive and violent.

The film was released by Tigon British Film Productions on June 15, 1967. It received generally positive reviews from critics.

== Plot ==
Marcus Monserrat is an elderly practitioner of medical hypnosis. He lives with his wife Estelle. He has invented a device which would allow him to control and feel another person's experience using the power of hypnosis.

They decide any youngster will do as their test subject. Marcus selects and invites Mike Roscoe to his house, with an offer of a 'new experience'. He uses the device on Mike and the procedure is successful: He and Estelle can feel everything Mike feels, and can also control him.

After the procedure, they decide to send Mike away to conduct the experiment over distance. Mike returns to the club where his girlfriend Nicole is waiting for him. Mike takes Nicole to a local hotel where they sneak in and swim in the pool.

Marcus and Estelle are able to experience everything Mike feels. While Marcus wants to publish his work, Estelle wants to make up for lost time and to experience new things. She convinces a reluctant Marcus to continue with their arrangement with Mike.

Next day, Estelle sees a fur jacket in a store and convinces Marcus to use Mike to steal the jacket. Marcus reluctantly agrees on the condition that they will not do it again. While Mike is at Nicole's apartment, Estelle and Marcus send Mike to steal the jacket. Mike leaves without informing Nicole, who decides to go a night club with their friend Alan. Despite a policeman getting involved, Mike successfully steals the jacket. During the theft, however, Mike cuts his hand, and both Marcus and Estelle have cuts in the same place.

Estelle realizes that they could do anything they want without any consequences. Estelle wants to experience the thrill of speed, so Estelle and Marcus make Mike borrow Alan's bike and ride very fast with Nicole on the pillion seat. When Alan confronts Mike, Estelle makes Mike assault him and his boss, Ron.

Estelle enjoys the experience but Marcus is shocked. He tries to prevent the fight but Estelle's mind turns out to be stronger. When Marcus confronts Estelle, Estelle assaults Marcus and destroys the experimental device, thereby preventing Marcus from reversing the experiment.

Mike blanks out every time Estelle and Marcus control him. A confused Mike visits his friend Audrey, but Estelle makes Mike kill her. Mike then goes to the night club and hooks up with pop singer Laura. Alan and Nicole see Mike taking Laura out of the night club. The couple are dropped by a taxi in a deserted street where Mike leads her up a deserted alley and orders her to sing. When she fails to follow his instructions, he kills her too.

The following day, Alan tells Nicole he believes Mike might have killed the girls. Alan wants to inform the police but Nicole convinces him to talk to Mike first. The police track Mike with help of the taxi driver. Alan and Nicole confront Mike about Laura but Mike does not remember anything.

Under the influence of Estelle, Mike attacks Alan again and escapes in a car. Police investigators track down Mike, and in the ensuing chase, Marcus interferes with Estelle's control. Mike's car crashes and catches fire. Back at the apartment, Estelle and Marcus are both dead due to burn injuries.

== Cast ==
- Boris Karloff as Professor Marcus Monserrat
- Catherine Lacey as Estelle Monserrat
- Elizabeth Ercy as Nicole
- Ian Ogilvy as Mike Roscoe
- Victor Henry as Alan
- Susan George as Audrey Woods
- Sally Sheridan as Laura Ladd
- Alf Joint as Ron
- Ivor Dean as Inspector Matalon
- Joe Cornelius as Taxi Driver
- Peter Fraser as Detective
- Meier Tzelniker as Jewish baker
- Gerald Campion as China shop customer
- Lee Grant & The Capitols as Club band

== Production ==
The original story and screenplay were written by novelist John Burke. Michael Reeves and his childhood friend Tom Baker heavily re-wrote the screenplay, including the ending at Karloff's insistence, wanting his character to appear more sympathetic. Burke was removed from the main screenwriting credit and was relegated to an 'idea by' credit. His original script was posthumously published in 2013, with an introduction by Matthew Sweet and additional material from Kim Newman.

== Reception ==
The Monthly Film Bulletin wrote: "If Michael Reeves' second film is a trifle disappointing after the promise of The Revenge of the Blood Beast (1966), it is probably because the direction is constantly undercut by stolidly pedestrian camerawork and indifferent colour. All the same, Reeves manages to build a considerable charge, particularly in the second half of the film, with a superbly baleful performance by Catherine Lacey (Karloff is his usual reliable self, but a shade weary), and a script which comes as close to authentic Sadisme as anything since Peeping Tom (1960) in its detailing of the increasing urgency of Estelle's thirst for experience: from innocent splashing in a swimming pool and highway speeding on a motor-cycle, through the first taste of brutality to two murders, the first a flurried affair with scissors, the second much more leisurely and with the added refinement of prior terrorisation. It is the overall effect that impresses rather than any individual scene or composition (unlike Revenge of the Blood Beast), but the "psychedelic experience" is particularly well done, with the victim's face literally disintegrating in blobs of colour. These effects were created by a teenage Joe Gannon, who was the first lightshow artist with Pink Floyd. "

Leslie Halliwell said: "Rather slight but oddly memorable horror film, with an elegant old lady becoming the real monster."

On Rotten Tomatoes, the film holds an approval rating of 100% based on 13 reviews, with a weighted average rating of 7.3/10.

=== Awards and nominations ===
Institution	Year	Category	Nominee	Result
Trieste Science Fiction Film Festival	1968	Best Actress	Catherine Lacey	Won
