= The Embalmer (1965 film) =

- Directed by: Dino Tavella
- Screenplay by: Dino Tavella; Giovan Battista Mussetto; Paolo Lombardo; Antonio Walter
- Story by: Dino Tavella; Antonio Walter
- Produced by: Antonio Walter
- Starring: Maureen Lidgard Brown; Gino Marturano; Alcide Gazzotto; Alba Brotto
- Cinematography: Mario Parapetti
- Edited by: Giovan Battista Mussetto
- Music by: Marcello Gigante
- Production company: Gondola Film
- Distributed by: Indipendenti Reiongali
- Release date: 1965
- Running time: 85 minutes
- Country: Italy

The Embalmer (Italian: Il mostro di Venezia, lit. 'The Monster of Venice') is a 1965 Italian giallo film directed by Dino Tavella, and starring Gino Marturano, Alcide Gazzotto, and Alba Brotto. Dino Tavella had a very short career in the Italian film industry, writing and directing only two films, The Embalmer and Una Sporca Guerra (A Dirty War).

== Plot ==
A serial killer dressed in scuba gear and a wet suit is on the loose in the canals of Venice. The skull-faced murderer kills women by drowning them in the canals and taking their bodies back to his underwater lair where he embalms them to preserve their beauty. A handsome young reporter is assigned to cover a group of visiting college girls on a class trip to Venice. When one of them disappears, he becomes involved in trying to find her. He proceeds to fall in love with one of the girls, not realizing that the Embalmer has her marked as his next victim.

== Cast ==
- Maureen Lidgard Brown
- Gino Marturano (credited as Gin Mart)
- Luigi Martocci
- Luciano Gasper
- Anita Todesco
- Francesco Bagarin
- Maria Rosa Vizzina
- Paola Vaccari
- Alba Brotto
- Alcide Gazzotto
- Pietro Walter
- Vicky Del Castillo
- Jti Janne (nightclub singer of the song "Il medium")

== Production ==
The Embalmer was described by film critic and historian Roberto Curti as being regionally produced away from Rome, with a cast of unknowns. Curti described the film as a giallo, while showing diverse influences such as borrowing elements from fumetti neri comics and dabbling into gothic horror. Critic Adrian Luther Smith called the film an "Edgar Wallace-inspired horror giallo"

== Release ==
The Embalmer was first released in 1965. It has very little circulation theatrically in Italy. On the film's release in the United States, it was titled The Embalmer. It played in Atlanta, Georgia on May 2, 1966. It played on double bills in the United States with The She Beast.

The Embalmer was released on DVD by Alpha Video on August 31, 2004. Alpha Video would later re-release the film on August 17, 2010 in its 12-disk "Pure Terror: 50 Movies Pack". In 2005 the film was released by Vintage Home Entertainment and Image Entertainment on July 12, and September 13, respectively. Mill Creek Entertainment released the film a total of four separate times. Mill Creek first released it as a part of two separate multi-feature movie packs in July and October 2007. The following year they would re-release the film as a part of its 24-disk "Tales of Horror: 100 Movie Pack", and lastly on August 28, 2009, as a part of yet another multi-film collection.

== Reception ==
From retrospective reviews, TV Guide gave the film 0 out of 5 stars, calling it "stupid". Curti stated that the films "mise-en-scene is amateurish and lacks thrills, despite some potentially interesting moments."

Adrian Luther Smith called the film creepy but still a "run-of-the-submerged-monastery affair", adding "The filmmakers obviously received a great deal of assistance from the Venice tourist department because the movie is jam-packed with sly plugs for a gorgeous city which surely needs no promotion."
