= John Stearne (witch-hunter) =

17th century English witch-hunter

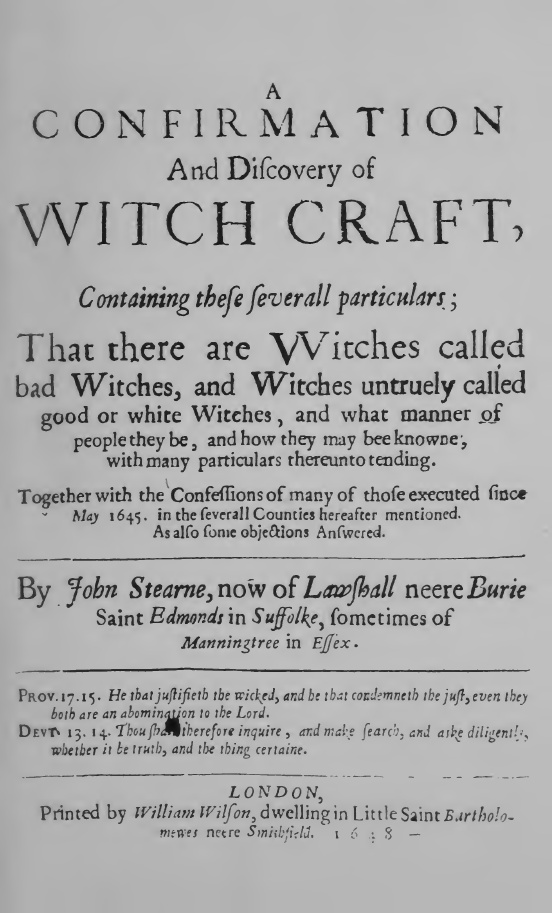
Title page of Stearne's A Confirmation and Discovery of Witchcraft, published in 1648

John Stearne (c. 1610–1670) was an associate of self-styled "Witchfinder General" Matthew Hopkins, who was active during the English Civil War. The duo's activities were heavily fictionalized in the 1968 horror film Witchfinder-General (U.S. title: The Conqueror Worm). Stearne was known at various times as the witch-hunter, and "witch pricker".

Raised in Long Melford, Suffolk, Stearne later became a land owner at Lawshall near Bury St Edmunds. He met Hopkins, who was 10 years' his junior, in Manningtree and appointed him as his assistant. As a result of Stearne's accusations, a trial was held in Chelmsford in July 1645 for 29 people accused of witchcraft and sorcery. Of these, four had died in prison prior to the trial and 15 or 16 were subsequently hanged. Nine who had been convicted of conjuring spirits were reprieved.

Within a year of the death of Matthew Hopkins, John Stearne retired to his farm and wrote A Confirmation and Discovery of Witchcraft.
