= Valentine Walton =

English politician

Member of the Long Parliament for Huntingdonshire

Personal details
- Born: c. 1594
- Died: 1661
- Known for: Regicide of Charles I

Valentine Walton (c. 1594–1661) was an English politician, a member of the Parliamentarian faction in the English Civil War, and one of the regicides of King Charles I of England.

== Biography ==
Walton came from an ancient and knightly family of Great Staughton in Huntingdonshire. Upon a vacancy he was returned a member of the Long Parliament for the County of Huntingdon. He was from the commencement of the English Civil War a soldier in the army of Parliament, rose to be a colonel, and fell into the king's hands; but was released, and ever after sided with greater steadiness to the army interest. Having married Margaret, sister of Oliver Cromwell, he then followed Cromwell in all his designs, and in none with more willingness than in putting King Charles I to death. Walton was one of the 59 Commissioners who sat in judgment at the trial of Charles I. He attended the trial on all the days except 12, 17, 18, 19, and 24 January 1649. He was present on 27 January when sentence was pronounced against Charles, and he signed and sealed that instrument, which commanded Charles to execution.

In the republic he was greatly employed, and confided in; he was of the Council of State in the years 1650, 1651, and 1652, appointed governor of King's Lynn and Crowland, with all the level of Ely, Holland and Marshland.

Walton was one of those who were steady, real republicans, who wished to change the form of government entirely, and refused honours under Cromwell's protectorate, who mistrusting him was obliged to have Walton watched to prevent his revolt.

At the return of the Long Parliament, in derision called the Rump Parliament, Walton rose again to greater power and authority than he had possessed before the Protectorate, and having seen the fate of a nation governed by an army, he took a decided part with Parliament, in preference to the military; and they trusted to him as one of those that were to counterpoise General George Monck; but he had no political capacity for such an enterprise, and seeing, what he most feared, that the monarchy would be restored, he prudently retired to the continent, and settled at Hanau in Germany, of which he was elected a burgess; but knowing the extreme hatred the royal family, especially the queen dowager, had to him, he left that town, and hid himself in the garb of a gardener in Flanders, and did not reveal his whereabouts until just before his death in 1661. Occasioned, no doubt, from the many misfortunes which overwhelmed him, and the dread of still greater.

Parliament had absolutely excepted Walton out of the Act of Indemnity of 1660 and confiscated his estate; a great part of what he had acquired belonged to the queen, as part of her dower. Had he been seized, his destruction would have been inevitable.

== Family ==
Walton married twice. His first wife was Margaret, sister of Oliver Cromwell. Their eldest son Valentine was a captain in Cromwell's regiment of horse and was killed at the Battle of Marston Moor. His second wife was Friscis, daughter of one Pym of Brill, Buckinghamshire, and widow of one Austen of the same place. Abandoned by Walton, she died in poverty and wretchedness at Oxford, 14 November 1662, and was buried in St Mary's Church in that city. By one or both these marriages he had children, who also were greatly affected by his reduced circumstances after the Restoration.

== See also ==
- John Gaule
