= Michael Reeves (director) =

English film director and screenwriter (1943–1969)

- Reeves in 1967
- Born: 17 October 1943
- Died: 11 February 1969 (aged 25); London, England
- Occupations: Film director; screenwriter

Michael Reeves (17 October 1943 – 11 February 1969) was an English film director and screenwriter. He is best remembered for the period folk horror film Witchfinder General (1968) (known in the US as The Conqueror Worm). A few months after the film's release, Reeves died in London at the age of 25 from an accidental alcohol and barbiturate overdose.

== Early life and career ==
Reeves was born in London on 17 October 1943, related to the family who founded the paint manufacturing company Reeves and Sons. He was educated at King's Mead and Radley College, English public schools, where he was obsessed by films and started his own school film club.

Reeves worked in films in various minor capacities for his idol Don Siegel, and then on The Long Ships (1964) for Jack Cardiff and Genghis Khan (1965) for Henry Levin. He subsequently went to work in Italy for producer Paul Maslansky on Castle of the Living Dead (1964), and then as director and co-writer of The She Beast (1966), which contains a witch hunt resembling the opening of Witchfinder General.

== The Sorcerers ==
Back in Britain, Reeves directed his second feature, The Sorcerers (1967). According to Tom Ryall, "[d]espite its low budget, Reeves was able to draw on fine performances from Boris Karloff and Catherine Lacey as old people who become obsessed with the violent sexual possibilities created by the permissive society, and Ian Ogilvy as the young man who becomes their unwitting tool. Its theme of controlling subjects at a distance and vicariously experiencing their sensations can be seen as a reflexive commentary on the cinema experience."

== Witchfinder General ==
Reeves is best known for his third and final film, Witchfinder General (1968). He was only 24 years old when he co-wrote and directed it. In 2005, Total Film magazine named Witchfinder General the 15th-greatest horror film of all time. Made on a modest budget in East Anglia and adapted from the novel by Ronald Bassett, Witchfinder General tells the story of Matthew Hopkins, the lawyer-turned-witchhunter who blackmails and murders his way across the countryside. Reeves imbues the film with a powerful sense of the impossibility of behaving morally in a society whose conventions have broken down, and though it is by no means free of the conventions of low-budget horror, it stands as a notably powerful and evocative film.

Reeves wanted Donald Pleasence to play the title role, but American International Pictures, the film's co-financiers, insisted on using their resident horror star Vincent Price instead. This caused friction between the actor and the young director. A famous story is told of how Reeves won Price's respect: Reeves was constantly telling Price to tone down his over-acting, and to play the role more seriously. Price eventually cracked, snapping, "Young man, I have made eighty-four films. What have you done?" Reeves replied: "I've made three good ones."

Reeves continued to goad Price into delivering a vicious and brilliant performance, and only upon seeing the finished film did the actor realise what the director was up to, at which point Price took steps to bury the hatchet with Reeves. Witchfinder General was released to mixed reviews, with one notably savage notice by Alan Bennett appearing in The Listener, but was soon reassessed and gained generally favourable reviews.

== Death ==
Reeves died in London a few months after the film's release. After shooting Witchfinder General, he was at work on an adaptation of The Oblong Box. He was taking tablets to help him sleep. On the morning of 11 February 1969, Reeves was found dead in his bedroom, aged 25, in Cadogan Place, Knightsbridge, by his cleaning lady. The coroner's report stated that Reeves's death (from a barbiturate overdose) was accidental, the dosage being too marginal to suggest intention.

== Filmography ==
Title	Year	Credited as			Notes	Ref(s)
Title	Year	Director	Screenwriter	Other	Notes	Ref(s)
Intrusion	1961	Yes		Yes	Short film, also acted	
Castle of the Living Dead	1964			Yes	2nd assistant director	
The She Beast	1966	Yes				
The Sorcerers	1967	Yes	Yes			
Witchfinder General	1968	Yes	Yes			

== Slated projects ==
Two films Reeves was apparently scheduled to direct, or for which he was being considered, were De Sade (1969) and The Buttercup Chain (1970). Both of these films were completed with other directors. Also in development was a film concerning the IRA, which was announced as a forthcoming Tigon production in the trade press, with the title of O'Hooligan's Mob. Reeves had talked of directing an adaptation of Walker Hamilton's novel All The Little Animals, but this did not reach pre-production stage.

== Bibliography ==
- Curti, Roberto (2015). Italian Gothic Horror Films, 1957-1969. McFarland. ISBN 978-1476619897.
- Halligan, Benjamin (2003). Michael Reeves. Manchester University Press. ISBN 0719063515.
