= Ronald Bassett =

British writer and novelist (1924–1996)

- Born: 10 April 1924; London, England
- Died: March 1996 (aged 71); Surrey, England
- Occupation: Writer
- Writing career
- Pen name: William Clive
- Genre: Historical fiction
- Military career
- Allegiance: United Kingdom
- Branch: Royal Navy
- Service years: 1938–1954
- Rank: Commander
- Unit: HMS Norfolk
- Conflicts: Second World War; Korean War
- Awards: Distinguished Service Medal

Ronald Leslie Bassett DSM (10 April 1924 – March 1996) was a British writer and novelist. He wrote numerous works of historical fiction, sometimes under the pseudonym of "William Clive". He received many awards for his medical and pharmaceutical writing.

== Personal life ==
Bassett was born in London to George William Bassett, a bank clerk, and Louisa (Vine) Bassett. He attended high school in London, and while in the military married Ivy Owens on 21 November 1944. His first wife died and he later married Sylvia Cruttwell on 6 November 1956, and they had two children.

== Military ==
Bassett joined the King's Royal Rifle Corps as a rifleman in 1938 and then transferred to the Royal Artillery as a gunner. In 1940 he transferred to the Royal Navy, where he worked in the communications branch. He served as a radio operator on the heavy cruiser HMS Norfolk during the Bismarck action and during the North African landings. Bassett was a radio operator on a landing craft during the Normandy invasion. As a petty officer during the Second World War he received the Distinguished Service Medal for bravery and resourcefulness. He remained in the navy after the war, and served on an aircraft carrier in the Korean War zone. He retired from the navy in 1954 as commander.

== Later life ==
In 1956, Bassett went to work for Smith, Kline & French Laboratories Ltd. as a public relations officer, and remained with them until 1966. After devoting himself solely to writing for three years, in 1969 he returned to the pharmaceutical corporate world going to work as a public relations officer for E. R. Squibb & Sons, a post he held until 1975 when he and his wife retired to Surrey.

== Fiction ==
Bassett's historical fiction includes The Carthaginian (1963), The Pompeians (1965), Amorous Trooper (1968), and Blood of an Englishman: A Novel of the Siege of Cawnpore (1975). His novel Witchfinder General (1966) was made into the controversial 1968 film of the same title directed by Michael Reeves and starring Vincent Price.

== Awards ==
Among Bassett's awards are:

- British Medical Association – Silver medal

1964 for "Small Price to Pay"
1965 for "Interuterine Contraception" and "Hypertension"

- British Medical Association – Gold medal

1966 for "The Right to Work"
1967 for "Seven Ages of Psychiatry"
