= The She Beast =

1966 British film by Michael Reeves

The She-Beast
- U.S. poster, showcasing a double feature with The Embalmer
- Directed by: Michael Reeves
- Written by: Charles B. Griffith; F. Amos Powell; Mel Welles; Michael Reeves
- Produced by: Paul M. Maslansky
- Starring: Barbara Steele; Ian Ogilvy; John Karlsen; Mel Welles
- Cinematography: Gioacchino Gengarell
- Edited by: Nira Omri
- Music by: Ralph Ferraro
- Production companies: Leith Productions; Euro American Pictures
- Distributed by: Miracle Films (UK); Cineriz (Italy)
- Release dates: 2 May 1966 (Atlanta); 1966 (London); July 1967 (Italy)
- Running time: 74 minutes
- Countries: United Kingdom; Italy
- Language: English
- Budget: £17,000

The She Beast (Italian: Il lago di Satana, lit. 'The lake of Satan', also known as Revenge of the Blood Beast) is a 1966 horror film directed and co-written by Michael Reeves, in his directorial debut. It stars Barbara Steele, John Karlsen, Ian Ogilvy and Mel Welles. The film was an international co-production between the United Kingdom and Italy. It premiered on May 2, 1966.

== Plot ==
In present-day Vaubrac, Transylvania, Count von Helsing reads a historical narrative from two hundred years before about the execution of Vardella, a woman accused of witchcraft. As she dies she swears vengeance for her murder.

Shifting to present day, a young, newly married British couple, Philip and Veronica, are traveling on their honeymoon and book a room in a hotel owned by alcoholic and voyeur Ladislav Groper.

While Groper carries their bags to the room, the couple has tea outdoors at a picnic table, and soon is approached by von Helsing, who seems anxious to befriend them and to relate the history of the Draculas to them. In the process, he recounts the story and curse of Vardella but the listeners find none of this interesting. He invites himself back the next day and Veronica tells him to come at noon, knowing they plan to be on their way at dawn.

In their room, Philip discovers Groper is peeping on them through the window. After beating up Groper and drawing blood, Philip wants to leave immediately but Veronica prefers to stay the night as planned.

The next day on the road, Philip loses steering control of the car, causing him to drive into a lake; a passing truck driver assists in retrieving what should have been Veronica but to his horror, is a monstrous corpse that looks a lot like the aforementioned Vardella, which he quickly wraps up.

To his great relief, von Helsing reassures Philip that he can help him get his wife back. Having little choice Philip begins to believe in von Helsing and what he says.

Meanwhile Vardella comes alive and goes on a killing spree against the descendants of the people who killed her two hundred years before, at which point von Helsing comes upon the scene and uses a syringe to drug her. After hiding her in the hotel, the Count and Philip go to pick up some ritual tools to exorcise Vardella, the one way that she can be changed back into Veronica.

After being jailed, the truck driver who found Vardella makes a deal to tell police where the body is in exchange for his freedom. He leads the police back to the hotel, where they find the now-alive, drugged body appearing dead. The police intend to have it autopsied, which would ruin any chances of getting Veronica back.

Philip and the Count manage to retrieve the body and steal the police van which it is in. Vardella awakens from her drugged state and von Helsing drugs her again, as well as the police officers which have now caught the van.

In the nick of time, two hundred years to the minute since, and in the same place as, the murder of Vardella, Philip and the Count perform the exorcism ritual at the lake. It is unclear if they succeed in bringing back Veronica.

== Cast ==
- Barbara Steele as Veronica
- Ian Ogilvy as Philip
- John Karlsen as Count von Helsing
- Mel Welles as Ladislav Groper
- Joe "Flash" Riley as Vardella, the She-Beast
- Richard Watson as Police Lieutenant
- Edward B. Randolph as Man on Scooter
- Peter Grippe as Policeman
- Lucretia Love as Groper's Niece
- Ennio Antonelli as Lorry Driver
- Kevin Welles as Boy in Flashback
- Woody Welles as Boy at Cockfight

== Production ==
=== Development ===
Director Michael Reeves had previously been an assistant director on Castle of the Living Dead (1964), produced by Paul Maslansky. After that film proved a financial success, Reeves invested his own money in The She-Beast to kickstart his directing career. Screenonline notes that the film contains elements that would recur in Reeves' later, more well-known film Witchfinder General, notably its opening witch-hunt scene.

The screenplay was written by Reeves, Charles B. Griffith, F. Amos Powell, and Mel Welles, under the collective pen name 'Michael Byron'.

=== Casting ===
Barbara Steele accepted a salary of $1,000 for working one single day. She was forced to work that day for 22 hours. Ian Ogilvy was an old friend of Reeves.

=== Filming ===
Filming took place in Italy (along Lake Vico and in Pomezia) and Yugoslavia. The entire film was shot in 21 days. Due to the film's low-budget, many members of the crew appeared in the film as minor roles.

Griffith and Welles were the film's second unit directors, and shot several comedic scenes without Reeves' input. Reeves was reticent to include them, but left them in because of the film's already brisk runtime.

== Release ==
The film was purchased for release by Miracle Films as Revenge of the Blood Beast and released in Kilburn, London in late 1966. It was released in Rome, Italy in July 1967, where it was distributed by Cineriz. The film was also released in 1966 in the United States by Europix Consolidated Corporation as The She-Beast. The film played as early as 2 May 1966 in Atlanta in the United States.'

=== Home media ===
On 28 April 2009, Dark Sky Films released a DVD version of the film in an anamorphic 2.35:1 transfer with a Dolby 2.0 mono soundtrack. Special features include an image gallery and an audio commentary by producer Paul Maslansky and actors Ian Ogilvy and Barbara Steele.

== Reception ==
A contemporary review in the Monthly Film Bulletin referred to the film as "An engaging horror film [...] the beginning is a trifle comatose with its self-consciously stylish slow tracks and compositions [...] it gradually gathers momentum while developing a nice line in comic grotesquerie with its furtively lecherous innkeeper" The review commented on Barbara Steele in the film noting that she "gets little chance to display the grand manner in her comparatively brief role, but the acting in general is sound (enormously helped by the fact that the leading players would appear to have dubbed their own dialogue)."

In June 2010, Nick Coccellato of Eccentric Cinema gave the film a rating of five out of ten, writing "The She-Beast, A.K.A. Revenge of the Blood Beast, is one of those movies that wouldn't be out of place on Mystery Science Theater 3000 back in the show's '90s heyday. The film is bad but not uninteresting, and there is a lot of the fun to be had in simply watching it unfurl with its lousy acting and overwrought direction [...]"
