= Matthew Hopkins =

English witch hunter (1620–1647)

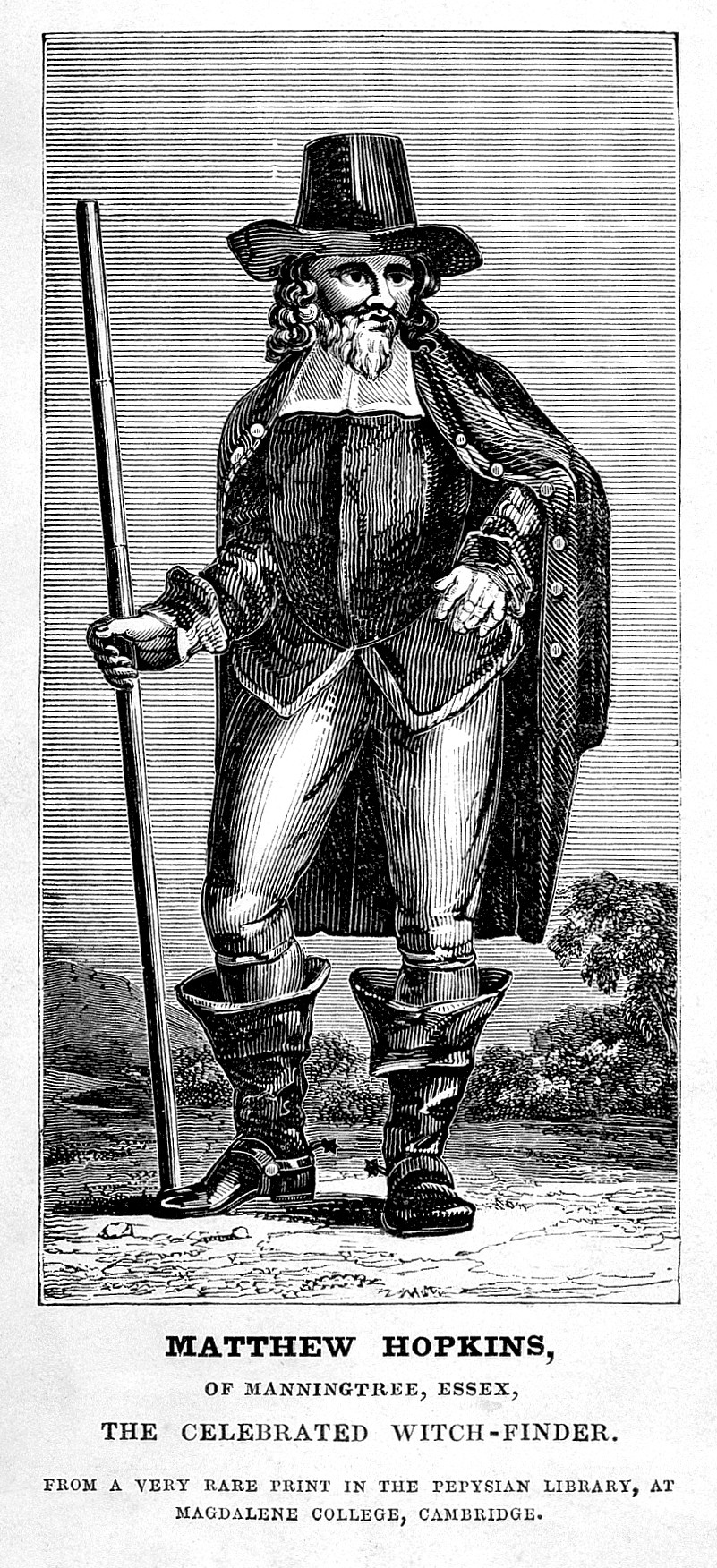
A portrait of Matthew Hopkins, 'The Celebrated Witch-finder', from the 1837 edition of The Discovery of Witches.

Matthew Hopkins (c. 1620 – 12 August 1647) was an English witch-hunter whose career flourished during the English Civil War. He was mainly active in East Anglia and claimed to hold the office of Witchfinder General, although that title was never bestowed by Parliament.

The son of a Puritan minister, Hopkins began his career as a witch-finder in March 1644 (Note: At this time the New Year did not occur until 25 March; all dates in this article before 1752 have been stated in the Julian calendar, with the year beginning on 1 January.) and lasted until his retirement in 1647. Hopkins and his colleague John Stearne sent more accused people to be hanged for witchcraft than all the other witch-hunters in England of the previous 160 years, and were solely responsible for the increase in witch trials during those years.

His methods of investigating witchcraft drew heavy inspiration from the Daemonologie of King James I, which was directly cited in Hopkins's book The Discovery of Witches. Although torture was nominally unlawful in England, Hopkins often used techniques such as sleep deprivation to extract confessions from his victims.

== Early life ==
Little is known of Matthew Hopkins before 1644, and there are no surviving contemporary documents concerning him or his family. He was born in Great Wenham, Suffolk, and was the fourth son of six children. His father, James Hopkins, was a Puritan clergyman and vicar of St John's of Great Wenham, in Suffolk. The family at one point held title "to lands and tenements in Framlingham 'at the castle'". His father was popular with his parishioners, one of whom in 1619 left money to purchase Bibles for his then three children James, John and Thomas.

Thus Matthew Hopkins could not have been born before 1619, and could not have been older than 28 when he died, but he may have been as young as 25. Although James Hopkins had died in 1634, when the iconoclast William Dowsing, commissioned in 1643 by the Parliamentarian Earl of Manchester "for the destruction of monuments of idolatry and superstition", visited the parish in 1645 he observed that "there was nothing to reform". Hopkins's brother John became Minister of South Fambridge in 1645 but was removed from the post a year later for neglecting his work. Hopkins states in his book The Discovery of Witches (1647) that he "never travelled far ... to gain his experience".

In the early 1640s, Hopkins moved to Manningtree, Essex, a town on the River Stour, about 10 miles (16 km) from Wenham. According to tradition, Hopkins used his recently acquired inheritance of a hundred marks (£66 13s. 4d.) to establish himself as a gentleman and to buy the Thorn Inn in Mistley. From the way that he presented evidence in trials, Hopkins is commonly thought to have been trained as a lawyer, but there is scant evidence to suggest this was the case.

== Witch-hunting ==
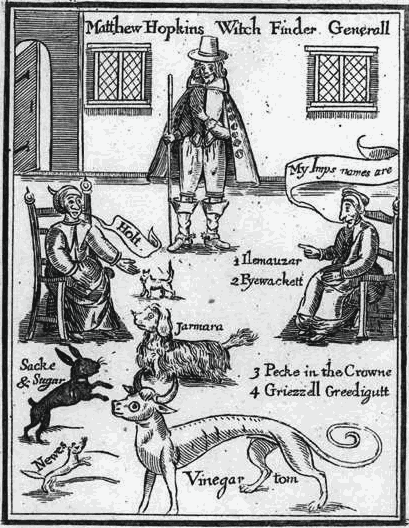
Frontispiece from Matthew Hopkins's The Discovery of Witches (1647), showing witches identifying their familiar spirits

Following the Lancaster Witch Trials (1612–1634), William Harvey, physician to King Charles I of England, had been ordered to examine the four women accused, and from this there came a requirement to have material proof of being a witch. The work of Hopkins and John Stearne was not necessarily to prove any of the accused had committed acts of maleficium, but to prove that they had made a covenant with the Devil. Before this point, any malicious acts on the part of witches were treated identically to those of other criminals, until it was seen that, according to contemporary beliefs about the structure of witchcraft, they owed their powers to a deliberate act of their choosing.

Witches then became heretics to Christianity, which became the greatest of their crimes and sins. Within continental and Roman Law witchcraft was crimen exceptum: a crime so foul that all normal legal procedures were superseded. Because the Devil was not going to "confess", it was necessary to gain a confession from the human involved.

The witch-hunts undertaken by Stearne and Hopkins were mainly in East Anglia, in the counties of Suffolk, Essex, Norfolk, Cambridgeshire and Huntingdonshire, with a few in the counties of Northamptonshire and Bedfordshire. They extended throughout the area of strongest Puritan and Parliamentarian influences which formed the powerful and influential Eastern Association from 1644 to 1647, which was centred on Essex. Both Hopkins and Stearne would have required some form of letters of safe conduct to be able to travel throughout the counties.

According to his book The Discovery of Witches, Hopkins began his career as a witch-finder after he overheard women discussing their meetings with the Devil in March 1644 in Manningtree. The first accusations were actually made by Stearne, and Hopkins was appointed as his assistant. Twenty-three women were accused of witchcraft and were tried at Chelmsford in 1645. As the English Civil War was in progress, the trial was conducted not by justices of assize, but by justices of the peace presided over by the Earl of Warwick. Four died in prison and nineteen were convicted and hanged. During this period, excepting Middlesex and chartered towns, no records show any person charged of witchcraft being sentenced to death other than by the judges of the assizes.

Hopkins and Stearne, accompanied by the women who performed the pricking, were soon travelling over eastern England, claiming to be officially commissioned by Parliament to uncover and prosecute witches. Together with their female assistants, they were well paid for their work, and it has been suggested that this was a motivation for his actions. Hopkins stated that "his fees were to maintain his company with three horses", and that he took "twenty shillings a town". The records at Stowmarket show their costs charged to the town to have been £23 (equivalent to £4,400 in 2025) plus his travelling expenses.

The costs to the local community of Hopkins and his company were such that, in 1645, a special local tax rate had to be levied in Ipswich. Parliament was well aware of Hopkins and his team's activities, as shown by the concerned reports of the Bury St. Edmunds witch trials of 1645. Before the trial, a report was carried to Parliament – "as if some busie men had made use of some ill Arts to extort such confession" – that a special Commission of Oyer and Terminer was granted for the trial of these witches. After the trial and execution the Moderate Intelligencer, a parliamentary paper published during the English Civil War, in an editorial of 4–11 September 1645, expressed unease with the affairs in Bury.

=== Methods of investigation ===
Methods of investigating witchcraft drew heavy inspiration from the Daemonologie of King James I, which was directly cited in Hopkins's The Discovery of Witches. Although torture was nominally unlawful in England, Hopkins often used techniques such as sleep deprivation to extract confessions from his victims. He would also cut the arm of the accused with a blunt knife, and if she did not bleed, she was said to be a witch. Another of his methods was the swimming test, based on the idea that as witches had renounced their baptism, water would reject them. Suspects were tied to a chair and thrown into water: all those who "swam" (floated) were considered to be witches. Hopkins was warned against the use of "swimming" without receiving the victim's permission first. This led to the legal abandonment of the test by the end of 1645.

Hopkins and his assistants also looked for the Devil's mark. This was a mark that all witches or sorcerers were thought to possess that was said to be dead to all feeling and would not bleed – although it was sometimes a mole, birthmark or an extra nipple. If the suspected witch had no such visible marks invisible ones could be discovered by pricking. Therefore, "witch prickers" were employed, who pricked the accused with knives and special needles looking for such marks, normally after the suspect had been shaved of all body hair. It was believed that the witch's familiar, an animal such as a cat or dog, would drink the witch's blood from the mark, as a baby drinks milk from the nipple.

=== Opposition ===
Hopkins and his company quickly ran into opposition after their work began, but one of his main antagonists was John Gaule, vicar of Great Staughton in Huntingdonshire. Gaule had attended a woman from St Neots who was held in gaol charged with witchcraft until such time as Hopkins could attend. Upon hearing that the woman had been interviewed, Hopkins wrote a letter to a contact asking whether he would be given a "good welcome". Gaule hearing of this letter wrote his publication Select Cases of Conscience touching Witches and Witchcrafts; London (1646) – dedicated to Colonel Walton of the House of Commons – and began a programme of Sunday sermons to suppress witch-hunting.

In Norfolk, both Hopkins and Stearne were questioned by justices of the assizes about the torturing and fees. Hopkins was asked if methods of investigation did not make the finders themselves witches, and if with all his knowledge did he not also have a secret, or had used "unlawful courses of torture". By the time this court session resumed in 1647, Stearne and Hopkins had retired, Hopkins to Manningtree and Stearne to Bury St Edmunds.

=== Colonial impact ===
Hopkins's witch-hunting methods were outlined in his book The Discovery of Witches, which was published in 1647. These practices were recommended in law books. During the year following the publication of Hopkins's book, trials and executions for witchcraft began in the New England colonies with the hanging of Alse Young of Windsor, Connecticut, on May 26, 1647, followed by the conviction of Margaret Jones. As described in the journal of Governor John Winthrop, the evidence assembled against Margaret Jones was gathered by the use of Hopkins's techniques of "searching" and "watching".

Jones's execution was the first in a witch hunt that lasted in New England from 1648 until 1663. About eighty people throughout New England were accused of practising witchcraft during that period, of whom fifteen women and two men were executed. Some of Hopkins's methods were employed during the Salem Witch Trials, which occurred primarily in Salem, Massachusetts in 1692–93. These trials resulted in 150 imprisonments and 19 executions for witchcraft, most by hanging. One man, Giles Corey, was pressed to death for refusing to plead.

== Death and legacy ==
Matthew Hopkins died at his home in Manningtree, Essex, on 12 August 1647, probably of pleural tuberculosis. He was buried a few hours after his death in the graveyard of the Church of St Mary at Mistley Heath. In the words of historian Malcolm Gaskill, Matthew Hopkins "lives on as an anti-hero and bogeyman – utterly ethereal, endlessly malleable". According to historian Rossell Hope Robbins, Hopkins "acquired an evil reputation which in later days made his name synonymous with fingerman or informer paid by authorities to commit perjury".

What historian James Sharpe has characterised as a "pleasing legend" grew up around the circumstances of Hopkins's death, according to which he was subjected to his own swimming test and executed as a witch, but the parish registry at Mistley confirms his burial there.

== Bibliography ==
- Boyer, Paul S.; Nissenbaum, Stephen, eds. (1972), Salem-Village Witchcraft: A Documentary Record of Local Conflict in Colonial New England, Northeastern University Press, ISBN 978-1-55553-165-2
- Cabell, Craig (2006), Witchfinder General: The Biography of Matthew Hopkins, Sutton Publishing, ISBN 978-0-7509-4269-0
- Deacon, Richard (1976), Matthew Hopkins: Witch Finder General, Frederick Muller, ISBN 978-0-584-10164-5
- Gaskill, Malcolm (2005), Witchfinders: A Seventeenth-Century English Tragedy, John Murray, ISBN 978-0-7195-6120-7
- Geis, Gilbert; Bunn Ivan (1997), A Trial of Witches A Seventeenth–century Witchcraft Prosecution, Routledge, ISBN 978-0-415-17109-0
- Notestein, Wallace (1911), A History of Witchcraft In England from 1558 to 1718, American Historical Association 1911 (reissued 1965) New York Russell & Russell, ISBN 978-1169793521
- Robbins, Rossell Hope (1959), The Encyclopedia of Witchcraft and Demonology, Peter Nevill
- Russell, Jeffrey B (1981), A History of Witchcraft, Thames & Hudson, ISBN 978-1-55553-165-2
- Seth, Robert (1969), Children Against Witches, Robert Hale Co., ISBN 978-0-7091-0603-6
- Sharpe, James (2002), "The Lancaster witches in historical context", in Poole, Robert (ed.), The Lancashire Witches: Histories and Stories, Manchester University Press, pp. 1–18, ISBN 978-0-7190-6204-9
- Thomas, Keith (1971), Religion and the Decline of Magic – Studies in Popular Beliefs in Sixteenth and Seventeenth Century England, Penguin Books, ISBN 978-0-14-013744-6
