= Alice Molland =

English woman executed for witchcraft

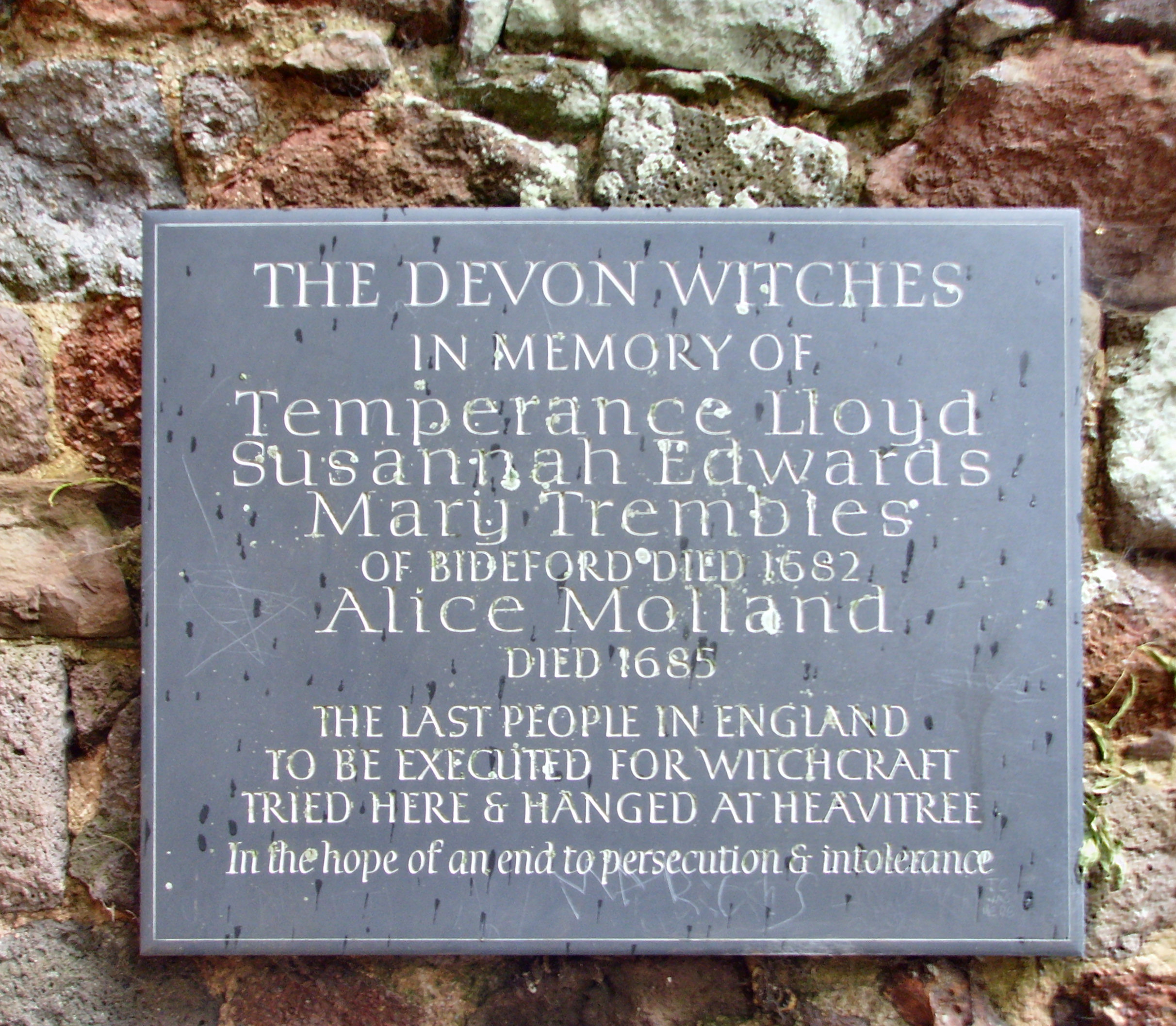
A plaque commemorating Molland, Lloyd, Edwards, and Trembles on the wall of Rougemont Castle in Exeter.

Alice Molland (possibly Avis Molland) was an English woman sentenced to death in Exeter in 1685 for witchcraft. Details of her trial remain scarce and poorly documented, and while she is often cited as the last person to have been hanged for witchcraft in England, there is no record of her execution, and it is not certain whether the sentence was carried out.

== Trial ==
Molland appeared at the Exeter assizes in March 1685 charged with witchcraft, and was condemned to death. However, unlike Temperance Lloyd, Mary Trembles, and Susannah Edwards of Bideford, who had been hanged as witches in 1682, there is no record that Molland was executed, and it is possible that the sentence was not carried out.

== Avis Molland ==
In the November 2024 edition of The Historian, Professor Mark Stoyle, University of Southampton, published his findings into research of Alice Molland.

"Court records from the 17th century were written in Latin, and in this form it would only have taken a single mis-stroke of the clerk of the court's pen to transform 'Avicia' (Avis) into 'Alicia' (Alice). Almost nothing is known about Alice's life and attempts to illuminate it have failed. So when I saw reference to an Avis Molland in local archives – knowing Molland was an unusual name in Exeter – I was struck by its close resemblance. I immediately asked myself, did 'Alice' Molland ever exist? Is Alice, in fact, Avis?"

Avis was married to Cornelius Molland, a freeman of the city, in Exeter Cathedral in 1663 and the pair went on to have several children. The records show that over a period of 10 years, three of their children and Cornelius died.

"By the time of the 1685 trial, Avis Molland was a poor, middle-aged widow, who was burdened with loss – precisely the kind of woman who was likely to be accused of witchcraft in early modern England."

Prof Stoyle went on to say that circumstantial evidence suggests Avis was imprisoned at Exeter Castle. She is recorded as testifying in 1685 against a woman accused of predicting an uprising of 2,500 weavers in a civil rebellion spreading across the West Country. It was possible that Avis overheard this woman boasting about the insurrection while visiting her husband who was imprisoned in the castle for rioting.

Avis died in 1693, eight years after the supposed execution of Alice. Prof Stoyle said "The lack of records for Alice's life, and the circumstantial evidence in support of the case for Avis being our condemned woman, points to a witch that lived. But the truth is, despite all my diligent searching, we may never know for sure whether history has got it wrong."

== See also ==
- Joan Peterson – last person executed for witchcraft in London (1652)
- Jane Dodson – last person charged with witchcraft in London (1683; acquitted)
- Jane Wenham – last person condemned to death for witchcraft in England (1712; conviction set aside)
- Mary Hicks – likely fictional person said to have been executed for witchcraft in Huntingdon (1716)
- Janet Horne – last person legally executed for witchcraft in Britain (1727)
