= Framlingham (disambiguation) =

Framlingham is a town in Suffolk, England, United Kingdom.

Framlingham may also refer to:

== People ==
- Framlingham Gawdy (1589–1654), English politician
- Michael Lord, Baron Framlingham (born 1938)

== Places ==
- Framlingham, Victoria, a town and former Aboriginal reserve in Australia

=== Associated with the English town ===
- Framlingham branch, a former railway line from Wickham Market to Framlingham
- Framlingham Castle, a castle
- Framlingham College, a school
- Framlingham Mere, a nature reserve and lake
- Framlingham railway station, a former railway station
- Framlingham Town F.C., a football club
- RAF Framlingham, former Royal Air Force base near Framlingham

== See also ==
- Framingham, Massachusetts, a city in the United States
