= Mary Hicks (alleged witch) =

Alleged accused witch, widely considered to be fictitious

Mary Hicks (also recorded as Hickes) is a woman alleged to have been executed for witchcraft in Huntingdon in 1716, alongside her nine-year-old daughter, Elizabeth. If true, Mary and Elizabeth Hicks would have been the last people executed for witchcraft in England. But the case's veracity has been questioned by historians and other researchers since its publication, with most considering it to be fictional or a hoax.

== Alleged trial and execution ==
During the witch trials in England, court proceedings and sentences were summarised by pamphlets intended for a general audience. The only known document that purports to be a primary record of Mary Hicks' trial is one such pamphlet, dated 1716, written anonymously and published by W. Matthews of Long Acre, London.

The pamphlet states that a wealthy farmer named Edward Hicks, Mary's husband and Elizabeth's father, accused both of using witchcraft to poison their neighbours, curse crops in Huntingdonshire, and control the climate. Edward discovered his family's use of black magic when Elizabeth confessed to him that Mary had taught her how to enchant the weather.

After Edward reported his wife and daughter to authorities, Mary and Elizabeth confessed their crimes to a Justice Wilmot, presiding over what was described as the "last" court of assizes held in Huntingdon. Wilmot would have, therefore, been a Justice of Assize, a judge with "the jurisdiction to pass the harshest possible sentences", rather than a Justice of the peace.

Wilmot sentenced Mary and Elizabeth Hicks to death by hanging on 20 July 1716, described in the pamphlet as a Friday. Mother and daughter were hanged on 28 July 1716, which the pamphlet states was a Saturday.

== Original pamphlet and its rediscovery ==
Both prior to and during the 21st century, several historians have investigated or otherwise questioned the historicity of the pamphlet. However, efforts to investigate the case were complicated by the fact that few historians based their analysis of the Hicks case on the original pamphlet until 1916, instead depending upon second-hand accounts provided by Richard Gough.

Mary Hicks' case first became a topic of academic discussion after Gough published the second edition of his historical and topographical compendium, British Topography. First compiled as one volume in 1768, the second edition was expanded into two volumes, published in 1770. Prior to 1770, Gough also printed a version of his essay on Huntingdonshire containing the story of Mary Hicks, naming the judge who condemned her as Powell. The original pamphlet provides the name Wilmot for the judge.

In the 1770 edition's first volume, Gough recounted in full the "tragical story" of "Mary Hickes and her daughter Elizabeth" as part of a section on Huntingdonshire. He corrected the name of the judge alleged to be involved in the case to Wilmot, reflecting the pamphlet. Gough did not footnote the story with the name of the pamphlet, instead incorporating the full name into the text. Subsequent discussion of the case was based on Gough's work, as the physical location of Gough's source was uncertain.

In 1916 Herbert Norris, founder of St Ives' Norris Museum, consulted a list of documents bequeathed by Gough to the Bodleian Library of the University of Oxford in 1799. Norris visited the library and found the original pamphlet, then shared his findings in Notes and Queries. As Norris stated, the pamphlet had been in the library for a century, apparently unidentified by many researchers, because none had realised "that the title [Gough] gave was the actual one of the original". However, some historians, like Wallace Notestein, had been aware of the original pamphlet earlier.

== Questions of historicity ==
=== Timing and independent corroboration ===
Some scholars have expressed doubt that a witch trial and execution would have occurred in 1716. The last substantiated execution in England for witchcraft is the 1682 Bideford witch trial, and public and state support for witchcraft trials had largely waned in Europe by the 18th century.

Writing in 1852, author James Crossley compared the Hicks case's apparent timing to the trial of Jane Wenham. Wenham, convicted of witchcraft in Hertfordshire in 1712, was pardoned before she could be executed after her case caused a "sensation", attracting national media coverage and political attention. Crossley opined that the Hicks trial, occurring just four years later and involving the execution of a child, should have attracted as much "public attention" as the Wenham case. Furthermore, Crossley claimed to have checked all editions of "two London newspapers" published in 1716, but could find no mention of either Hicks. Crossley did not say which newspapers he had checked. Later, in 1891, lawyer and politician Frederick Inderwick reported that no historian had been able to find the Hicks case in London newspaper archives by then.

Journalist W. H. Bernard Saunders opined in 1888 that the Hicks story was "an entire fabrication". Saunders related that local Reverend Edward Bradley had not yet obtained any physical records of the trial, even though Bradley had been collecting materials related to Huntingdonshire "for upwards of 40 years". Additionally, according to Saunders, there was no Justice Wilmot in the county until "several years after 1716".

Folklorist Christina Hole wrote in 1957 that no other contemporary reference had surfaced for the Hicks trial since the 1716 pamphlet, which she described as "doubtful". She described the cases of Hicks and the Northamptonshire witches as "thought to be fictitious". In a short talk in 2020, Stuart Orme, curator of the Cromwell Museum, reaffirmed that no "corroborating evidence" for the Hicks trial had ever been found. Orme has opined that the case may be "an example of Early Modern fake news".

=== Similarities with other accounts ===
In 1911 Wallace Notestein observed that the acts of sorcery attributed to Mary and Elizabeth Hicks in the 1716 pamphlet resembled earlier cases. One example Notestein provided is the case of John Lowes, vicar of All Saints' Church, Brandeston, executed for witchcraft in 1645 after being accused of having "bewitched a ship" to make it sink. The 1716 pamphlet alleges that Elizabeth Hicks, too, attempted to sink a ship.

Later, in 1957 Christina Hole drew a parallel between Elizabeth Hicks' story and a similar account of alleged witchcraft featured in The Discoverie of Witchcraft (1584), itself adapted from the Malleus Maleficarum (1486). Both accounts feature young girls who take a walk with their father, and offer to change the weather. When the father asks who taught them magic, the girl answers that her mother did.

=== Omission by Francis Hutchinson ===
Bishop Francis Hutchinson, in 1718 and 1720, published two editions of an influential treatise condemning the belief in and prosecution of witches: An Historical Essay Concerning Witchcraft. Both editions include a chronology of major alleged witches in history; both editions dedicate a chapter to the case of Jane Wenham, and both describe the 1682 Bideford trial as the last executions of witches in England. Hutchinson also conducted personal research into alleged witches, and enlisted the help of judges, including John Powell.

Hutchinson's essay does not mention Mary or Elizabeth Hicks. According to James Crossley, Wallace Notestein and Montague Summers, it is unlikely that Hutchinson, who had personally investigated Wenham and consulted knowledgeable researchers to write his essay, would have omitted the Hicks trial without good reason.

=== Serial hoax theory ===
In 1911 historian Wallace Notestein expressed doubts about the authenticity of the Hicks case in his book, A History of Witchcraft in England from 1558 to 1718. He connected the document to two earlier pamphlets, dated 1705, that purported to outline the witch trials and executions of two Northamptonshire women, Elinor Shaw and Mary Phillips. The 1705 pamphlets were both written by an author identifying themselves as Ralph Davis.

Notestein, taking the view that all three were fictitious or hoaxes, opined that the three pamphlets were authored by the same person due to similarities in language. For example, the accounts of the deaths of Shaw, Phillips and the Hicks pair described all four as giving "last Dying Speeches... at the place of Execution". Writing in 1927, Montague Summers agreed it was "plain that the Northamptonshire witch pamphlets of 1705 [were] purely fictitious", and the "Huntingdonshire narrative" was similarly dubious.

=== Dates ===
In an 1888 publication Frederick Inderwick noted that the pamphlet ascribes incorrect days of the week to stated dates. Inderwick's calculation was itself mistaken: he concluded that 20 July 1716 was a Tuesday, making the 28th a Saturday. In fact, in the July of 1716, the 20th fell on a Monday, and the 28th on a Tuesday. The pamphlet's days of the week subsequently contradict the Gregorian calendar.

== Arguments for authenticity ==
=== Record-keeping ===
According to historian Stuart Orme, Huntingdonshire's court records from the alleged time of the Hicks trial were lost to a fire, which may have complicated independent verification of the 1716 pamphlet. Indeed, the Cambridgeshire Archives reports hosting records for Huntingdonshire "from 1734 onwards" only, partly because earlier records were lost to a 1754 fire and partly because past governments had a "slapdash" approach to record-keeping.

=== Media reporting ===
On the apparent absence of the Hicks story in newspaper archives, Frederick Inderwick suggested that censorship may have precluded major newspapers from reporting on the trial. He also opined that the London Gazette generally "contained very little, if any" news from rural parts of England at the time.

== Possible author motivation ==
=== Literary interest ===
W. H. Bernard Saunders opined in 1888 that the Hicks pamphlet was the product of an "unprincipled" pamphleteer who "wrote only from sordid motives". Montague Summers expressed a similar view in 1937, describing the Hicks and Northamptonshire pamphlets as "purely fictitious... catchpenny" stories designed to sell copies.

Historian Owen Davies, in 2021, described "cheap trial pamphlets" as examples of "early-modern popular literature", in which creative liberties were common. Describing the Hicks pamphlet as "likely bogus", he related it to pamphlets that may have sought to present "familiar fictional stories of revenge".

=== Scottish influence ===
Historian Paul Monod suggested in 2013 that the "popular fear of witches" was stronger in Scotland than it was in England in the early 18th century. He described the Hicks pamphlet as one example of "false, but entirely plausible reports of witch trials" published in the early 1700s.

Echoing Notestein's theory that the author of the Hicks pamphlet also wrote the Northamptonshire pamphlets, Monod noted that 'Ralph Davis' described the alleged witches being "hanged almost to death and burned", which was "a Scottish practice" rather than English. Monod therefore argued that the purpose of all three pamphlets was "to encourage English readers to believe in witches [and] treat them as their Scots brethren did".

=== Social control ===
In a 2017 study of witchcraft pamphlets, historian Charlotte-Rose Millar similarly described the Hicks document as one of several late 17th and early 18th century publications that addressed people who doubted the existence of witchcraft directly, in a bid to "quell scepticism". Indeed, the Hicks pamphlet begins with the author presenting scripture as evidence that sorcery exists.

Millar also identified eight pamphlets published in the 18th century, of which only two portray witchcraft as a "collaborative" activity, indicative of a conspiracy: the Hicks case, and a pamphlet by Ralph Davis. Notestein had earlier suggested that Davis was the author of both pamphlets. Millar suggested that, in the "religiously unstable climate" of the era, portraying witches as conspirators invited wider society to draw associations with minority religious groups such as Catholics or Quakers.
