= Mary Hicks =

Mary Hicks may refer to:

- Mary W. Hicks, professor emerita at Florida State University
- Mary Hicks (alleged witch) (died 1716), thought to be the last person executed in England for witchcraft
- Mary Dana Hicks (1836–1927), American art educator
