= Brandeston =

Village in Suffolk, England

Coordinates: 52.197981°N 1.289091°E

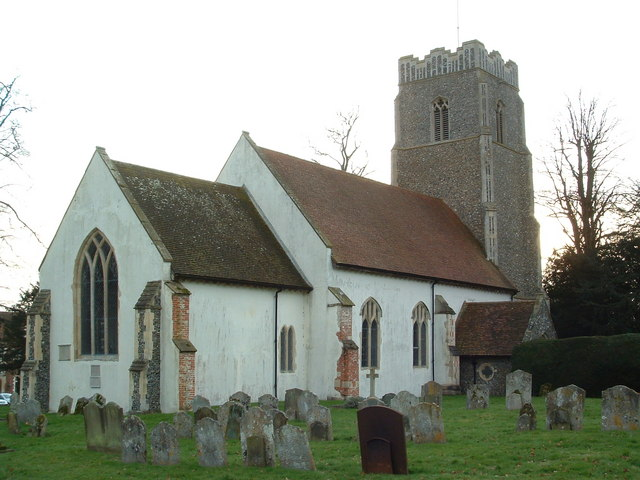
- All Saints' Church, Brandeston

- Location within Suffolk
- Interactive map of Brandeston
- Area: 5.05 km^{2} (1.95 sq mi)
- Population: 296 (2011)
  - Density: 59/km^{2} (150/sq mi)
- OS grid reference: TM2460
- Civil parish: Brandeston
- District: East Suffolk
- Shire county: Suffolk
- Region: East
- Country: England
- Sovereign state: United Kingdom
- Post town: WOODBRIDGE
- Postcode district: IP13
- Dialling code: 01728
- Police: Suffolk
- Fire: Suffolk
- Ambulance: East of England

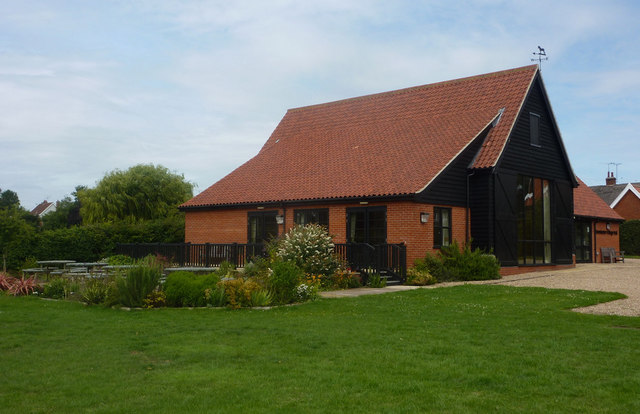
Village hall, Brandeston

Brandeston is a village in Suffolk, England on the River Deben 11 miles (18 km) northeast of Ipswich. Brandeston is west of Kettleburgh and northwest of Hoo Green. It is a Parish in Plomesgate district and 3½ miles SW of Framlingham r. station."

== History ==
Brandeston Priory is to the north of the village, on the road to Earl Soham. It is a Grade II* farmhouse, dating back to 1586.

"19th century Brandeston Hall stands beside the church; for many centuries, its predecessor on the site was home to the Revett family, but it is now a public school."

Brandeston Hall, the largest building in the village, is now the preparatory department of nearby Framlingham College. It was largely destroyed in a fire in 1847 and rebuilt as an exact replica by its then owner Charles Austin QC, who married Harriet Jane Ingilby of Ripley Castle and died at the hall.

Sutton Hoo, a few miles away from Brandeston, is the ceremonial burial place of the first English kings, who led their people through the misty marshlands of what is now the River Deben and established their first settlements on its banks.

The number of households from the period 1831 to 1961 fluctuates with little pattern. The data has no huge anomalies except for one but yet no clear relationship. For example, the one large anomaly in the data is the period from 1831 to 1851. In 1831 there were 64 occupied households yet in 1841 there were 108 before declining again to 66 households occupied in 1851.

The 20th century map of Brandeston from Vision of Britain shows Brandeston and the surrounding villages, including Cretingham, Hoo and Kettleburgh.

== Churches ==
The medieval parish church (the Church of All Saints) is a Gothic building, with a square tower. There is an Independent chapel, built in 1838, capable of accommodating 400 persons. In 1602, the chancel of All Saints was described as ruinous, and from 1861 to 1863 restoration of the church began.

The Vicar of Brandeston between 1596 and 1645 was John Lowes. Lowes was accused of witchcraft by the self-styled 'Witchfinder General' Matthew Hopkins, and was tried at the 1645 Bury St Edmunds witch trial where he was hanged. Lowes story was dramatised as part of Ronald Bassett's 1966 novel Witchfinder General which was released as a film two years later. Lowes' figure now features on the village sign, hanging from the gallows.

== Demographic ==
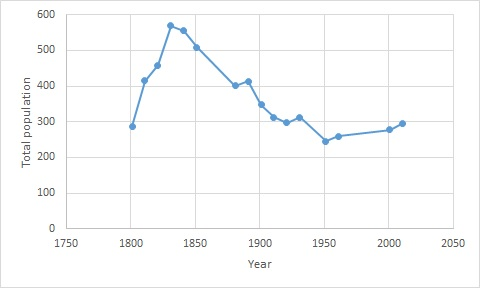
Population series for Brandeston

According to the 2011 Census, there were 144 males and 152 females living in Brandeston. The median age of residents in Brandeston is 48 and 49.3% of all usual residents are in the age range of 45–74, according to the Office of National Statistics.

Occupations have been grouped by status from 1831 data. It shows that there were 15 people categorised as Employers & Professionals, 31 as Middling Sorts, 70 as Labourers & Servants and 22 as Others. The graph titled 'Occupational structure for Brandeston in 1881' shows the dominance of men working during this time. The main occupational sector for men was by far agriculture, the second most popular sector was persons working with houses, furniture and decorations, and thirdly those working with animals. The women's occupational structure is very different with unknown occupations, persons without specified occupations and domestic offices or services all being the main sectors that they worked in.

Occupation definitions are different from those in 1831. In 2011 out of 134, 42 work in Professional occupations, 27 work in Associate Professional and Technical Occupations, 21 as Managers, Directors and Senior Officials, 14 in Administrative and Secretarial Occupations, 14 in Skilled Trades Occupations, 7 in Caring and Leisure Occupations, 6 in Sales and Customer Service Occupations, 2 in Elementary Occupations and 1 in Process, Plant and Machine Operatives.

General health in Brandeston was mostly 'Very Good Health' in 2011 with a majority of 162 usual residents under this category, 106 under 'Good Health', 23 under 'Fair', 5 under 'Bad' and no residents in the 'Very Bad Health' category.

== In fiction ==
Brandeston features prominently in Ronald Bassett 's 1966 novel Witchfinder General and in the 1968 film of the same name, although the latter was not filmed in the village.

== Notable residents ==
- William Clubbe (1745–1814), clergyman and poetical writer.
- Alan Greene (1856–1928), cricketer.
- William Verner Longe (1857–1924), painter, best known for his paintings of horses.
- Ghillean Prance (1937- ), botanist, ecologist, and Director of the Royal Botanic Gardens, Kew between 1988 and 1999.

== Gallery ==
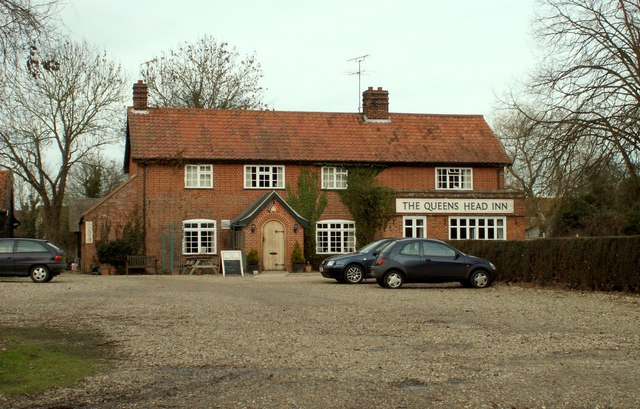
The Queens Head Inn, Brandeston

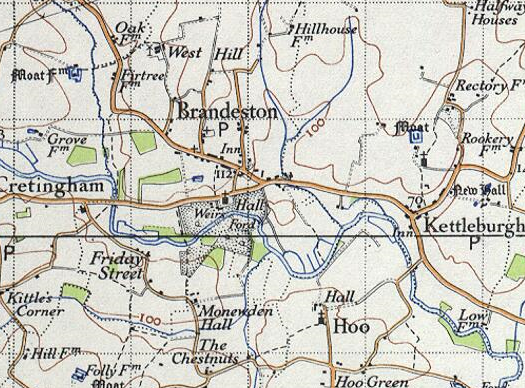
20th century map of Brandeston, Suffolk

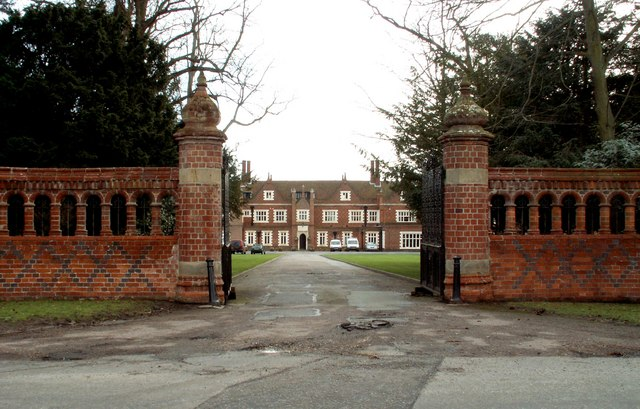
Brandeston Hall
