= Joan Neville =

Joan Neville may refer to:

- Joan Beaufort, Countess of Westmorland (c. 1379–1440), married Ralph Neville, 1st Earl of Westmorland
- Joan Neville (alleged witch) (died 1660), English woman executed for witchcraft
