= John Clubbe =

John Clubbe may refer to:

- John Clubbe (priest) (c.1703–1773), English cleric and satirical writer
- John Clubbe (academic) (1938–2022), American professor of English
