= William Clubbe =

English clergyman and poet

William Clubbe (or Clubb) (1745–1814) was an English clergyman and poetical writer.

== Life ==
He was seventh son of John Clubbe, rector of Whatfield in Suffolk, baptised at Whatfield on 16 April 1745. He was educated at Newcome's School and Caius College, Cambridge, where he matriculated in 1762 and graduated LL.B. in 1769. In the same year he was instituted to the rectory of Flowton, and in the following year to the vicarage of Brandeston, both in Suffolk. He took an antiquarian interest in brasses and other materials removed on the restoration work in Letheringham church, a modernisation pushed through by Thomas Rede, attorney at Beccles.

Clubbe lived at Brandeston until 1808, when, having lost his wife, he moved to the house of his youngest brother, Nathaniel, an attorney at Framlingham. There he died on 16 October 1814. His wife was Mary, daughter of the Rev. William Henchman; they had no issue. His biography appeared in vol. 6 of Illustrations of the Literary History of the Eighteenth Century by John Nichols, where he was called second son of John Clubbe.

== Works ==
His works include:

- The Emigrants, a Pastoral, Ipswich, 1793.
- Six Satires of Horace; in a style between free imitation and literal version, Ipswich, 1795. Modernisations included William Herschel as Lynceus.
- The Epistle of Horace to the Pisos on the Art of Poetry; translated into English verse, Ipswich, 1797.
- The Omnium; containing the Journal of a late Three Days Tour in France; curious and extraordinary anecdotes, critical remarks, and other miscellaneous pieces, in prose and verse, Ipswich, 1798.
- Ver: de Agricola Puero, Anglo Poemate celeberrimo excerptum, et in morem Latini Georgici redditum, Ipswich, 1801, and 1804. A translation into Latin of part of Robert Bloomfield's Farmer's Boy.
- Three Lyric Odes, on late Celebrated Occasions, Ipswich, 1806.
- Parallel between the Characters and Conduct of Oliver Cromwell and Bonaparte (1812). As "A British Officer".
- A Plain Discourse on the Subject of National Education (1812).
- A Plain Discourse [on Prov. iv. 11] on the … Establishment of a Sunday School (1812). Anonymous.
- Miscellaneous poems, in manuscript (British Library Addit. MS. 19201, f. 81 seq).

An anonymous pamphlet of 1805, accusing Methodist labourers of seditious intentions, was published at Ipswich as A Letter to a Country Gentleman, on the Subject of Methodism; It is attributed to Clubbe. John Spencer Curwen found amusing in it the complaint about Methodist labourers singing hymns at home after work. Clubbe also published anonymously an Address to the lower classes of his parishioners on the subject of Methodism (1806).

== Notes ==
Attribution

This article incorporates text from a publication now in the public domain: Stephen, Leslie, ed. (1887). "Clubbe, William". Dictionary of National Biography. Vol. 11. London: Smith, Elder & Co.
