= Mary Baguley =

English woman executed for witchcraft

Mary Baguley (died 1675) was a Cheshire woman who was among the final victims of the witch trials in England.

== Biography ==
Baguley was a herbalist from Wildboarclough, Cheshire.

=== Alleged witchcraft ===
One of Baguley's last clients was Robert Hall, a married schoolteacher who lived in nearby Wincle. Hall fell ill for a period of ten days in 1674, and Baguley visited him to provide a traditional ointment as a remedy.

Despite Baguley's efforts, trial records provide that Hall suffered "trembling fits" and coughed up blood; he also sweat excessively throughout his "great pain and torment". One night, after finding himself unable to speak for half an hour, Hall told his wife that Baugley had cursed him, having "crushed his heart in pieces".

=== Trial ===
Hall's death on the tenth night of his mysterious illness was attributed to Baguley, even though she was not physically present. At trial, Baguley and expert witnesses were asked to name the ingredients used in the ointment she had given Hall. Because Baguley used unusual terminology, she was found guilty of witchcraft.

=== Execution ===
On 26 April 1675, Baguley was sentenced to death by the Chester Assizes (now Chester Crown Court) and executed by hanging. Hers was the final witchcraft trial heard in Chester. She was also one of the last people to be executed for sorcery in England, as the prevalence of witch trials steeply declined after 1660.

== Legacy ==
Local legend provides that Baguley's ghost haunts Heild End Farm, a historic farmhouse in Wildboarclough. However, no historical evidence associates Baguley with the farmhouse's location.
