= Joan Neville (alleged witch) =

English woman executed for witchcraft

Joan Neville (died 1660) was an English woman who was executed for witchcraft.

She was accused of having bewitched the nobleman Sir Orlando Bridgeman and to have caused his death by use of magic.

She was executed by hanging in Kingston-upon-Thames 3 September 1660. Her trial belonged to the last witch trials in England to have resulted in an execution, since witch trials gradually became fewer after the Stuart Restoration of 1660.

== See also ==
- Joan Peterson
- Jane Dodson
- Witchcraft in early modern Britain
