= Listed buildings in Whatfield =

Civil Parish in Suffolk, England

Whatfield is a village and civil parish in the Babergh District of Suffolk, England. It contains 17 listed buildings that are recorded in the National Heritage List for England. Of these one is grade I and 16 are grade II.

This list is based on the information retrieved online from Historic England.

== Key ==
Grade	Criteria
I	Buildings that are of exceptional interest
II*	Particularly important buildings of more than special interest
II	Buildings that are of special interest

== Listing ==
Name	Grade	Location	Type	Completed (Note: The date given is the date used by Historic England as significant for the initial building or that of an important part in the structure's description.)	Date designated	Grid ref. (Note: The grid reference is based on the British national grid reference system, sometimes known as OSGB36, used by the Ordnance Survey.) Geo-coordinates	Notes	Entry number (Note: The "List Entry Number" is a unique number assigned to each listed building and scheduled monument by Historic England.)	Image	Wikidata
Barn to West of Whatfield Hall	II				10 July 1980	TM0164447311; 52°05′15″N 0°56′30″E		1351583	Upload Photo	Q26634671
Barrard's Hall	II				10 July 1980	TM0234845931; 52°04′29″N 0°57′04″E		1037036	Upload Photo	Q26288727
Whatfield Hall	II				10 July 1980	TM0168047284; 52°05′14″N 0°56′32″E		1182675	Upload Photo	Q26477916
Church of St Margaret	I	Church Lane	church building		23 January 1958	TM0249546630; 52°04′52″N 0°57′14″E		1284413	Church of St Margaret More images	Q17542288
Corner Cottage	II	Church Lane			10 July 1980	TM0257046582; 52°04′50″N 0°57′18″E		1182694	Upload Photo	Q26477933
Tey Cottage	II	Church Lane			10 July 1980	TM0257546597; 52°04′50″N 0°57′18″E		1351584	Upload Photo	Q26634672
The Cottage	II	Church Lane			10 July 1980	TM0254446609; 52°04′51″N 0°57′16″E		1037037	Upload Photo	Q26288728
Ferneaux Farmhouse	II	Naughton Road			10 July 1980	TM0252246918; 52°05′01″N 0°57′16″E		1284421	Upload Photo	Q26573193
The Old Rectory	II	Rectory Road, IP7 6QU			23 January 1958	TM0194346220; 52°04′39″N 0°56′44″E		1351585	Upload Photo	Q26634673
Hill Farmhouse	II	Semer Road			10 July 1980	TM0171046726; 52°04′56″N 0°56′33″E		1182704	Upload Photo	Q26477942
Bay Tree Cottage	II	The Green			10 July 1980	TM0228246329; 52°04′42″N 0°57′02″E		1037039	Upload Photo	Q26288730
Pound Cottage	II	The Green			10 July 1980	TM0231146400; 52°04′44″N 0°57′04″E		1037038	Upload Photo	Q26288729
The Cottage on the Green	II	The Green			10 July 1980	TM0230046374; 52°04′44″N 0°57′03″E		1182696	Upload Photo	Q26477935
Four Horse Shoes Inn	II	The Street			10 July 1980	TM0241346474; 52°04′47″N 0°57′09″E		1351603	Upload Photo	Q26634689
Rose Cottage Springdale Stones	II	The Street			10 July 1980	TM0259346570; 52°04′49″N 0°57′19″E		1351604	Upload Photo	Q26634690
Street Farmhouse	II	The Street			10 July 1980	TM0265646613; 52°04′51″N 0°57′22″E		1036999	Upload Photo	Q26288679
Virginia Cottage and Church Corner	II	The Street			10 July 1980	TM0254446578; 52°04′50″N 0°57′16″E		1036998	Upload Photo	Q26288678

== See also ==
- Grade I listed buildings in Suffolk
- Grade II* listed buildings in Suffolk

== Sources ==
- Bettely, James; Pevsner, Nikolaus (2015) [1961], Suffolk: West, The Buildings of England, New Haven and London: Yale University Press, ISBN 978-0-300-19655-9
