= Jane Wenham =

Jane Wenham may refer to:

- Jane Wenham (alleged witch) (died 1730), subject of what is commonly but erroneously regarded as the last witch trial in England
- Jane Wenham (actress) (1927–2018), English actress
