= Walter Miecznikowski =

English footballer (left winger)

Personal information
- Full name: Walter Louis Miecznikowski
- Date of birth: 22 April 1877
- Place of birth: Paddington, England
- Date of death: 1941 (aged 64)
- Place of death: London, England
- Position: Left winger

Senior career*
Years	Team	Apps	(Gls)
- Framlingham College
- Pemberton
- Clapton
1901	Notts County		
1901–1903	Portsmouth		
1903	West Ham United	3	(0)
1903–1904	Fulham	2	(0)
- Southern United
- * Club domestic league appearances and goals

Walter Louis Miecznikowski (22 April 1877 — 1941) was an English footballer who played as a left winger.

== Football career ==
Miecznikowski began his career at Framlingham College, playing for the college's football team in the Suffolk Senior Cup side whilst studying. Miecznikowski proceeded to play for Pemberton, signing for Clapton in 1899. In 1901, Miecznikowski was playing in the Football League for Notts County, whilst retaining his registration with Clapton. Later that year, Miecznikowski signed for Portsmouth, playing with the club for two years. In 1903, Miecznikowski signed for West Ham United. Miecznikowski made three appearances for West Ham, signing for Fulham later that year. In 1904, after a single season at Fulham, Miecznikowski signed for newly formed club Southern United.

== Cricket career ==
Alongside football, Miecznikowski was a keen cricketer, playing for Middlesex County Cricket Club's second XI. In summer 1908, Miecznikowski hit 200 not out against Fulham Cricket Club for Honor Oak Cricket Club.

== Personal life ==
Miecznikowski's brother, Edward, played alongside him for Clapton and Southern United.

Following his retirement from football, Miecznikowski worked as private secretary to Alexandra of Denmark.
