= Brandeston Hall =

House in Brandeston, Suffolk, UK

Coordinates: 52.194381°N 1.286961°E

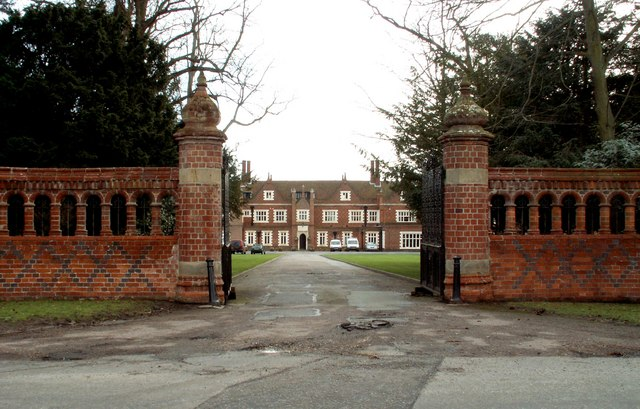
Brandeston Hall

Brandeston Hall is a grade II* listed house in Old Maids Lane, Brandeston, Suffolk, England.

The Hall is the former manor house of Brandeston but is now used for educational purposes. The original house was built around 1550 for Andrew Revett, but only the east wing and entrance porch survive from a fire of 1847 that destroyed most of the house. It was rebuilt in 1848 for Charles Austin, a lawyer and the head of the Parliamentary Bar.

Brandeston Hall was used as a military headquarters during World War II. 8th Army Group Royal Artillery was formed there on 1 May 1943 by conversion of the Headquarters, Royal Artillery, of 54th (East Anglian) Infantry Division.

It was acquired by Framlingham College in 1949, as recorded in a Latin inscription over the doorway. The ceiling to the headmaster's study has painted portraits of 24 famous men.
