= Thomas Raymond (judge) =

English judge

Sir Thomas Raymond or Rayment (1626/7 — 14 July 1683) was an English judge. Born to Robert Raymond in Bowers Gifford, he was educated at a school in Bishop's Stortford before matriculating to Christ's College, Cambridge on 5 April 1643. On 6 February 1645 he joined Gray's Inn, being called to the Bar there on 11 February 1651. In October 1677 he became a Serjeant-at-Law, before being appointed a Baron of the Exchequer on 1 May 1679 and knighted on 26 June. On 7 February 1680 he became a Justice of the Common Pleas, and on 24 April 1680 transferred to the Court of King's Bench. He died on 14 July 1683, leaving behind a set of law reports titled Reports of divers special cases adjudged in the courts of king's bench, common pleas, and exchequer in the reign of King Charles II, which were published in 1696, 1743, 1793 and 1803. His son, Robert Raymond, also later became a judge.

Commentators of the time identified him as having "extraordinary servility" and being an "unprincipled judge", with his failure in the Bideford witch trial to point out the "irrationality" of the defendants' confessions leading to their convictions and executions.

== Bibliography ==
- Foss, Edward (1870). A Biographical Dictionary of the Justices of England (1066 - 1870). Spottiswoode and Company. OCLC 181068114.
- Sainty, John (1993). The Judges of England 1272 -1990: a list of judges of the superior courts. Oxford: Selden Society. OCLC 29670782.
- Dictionary of the National Biography
