= Alan Greene (cricketer) =

English cricketer

Personal information
- Born: 15 April 1856; Brandeston, Suffolk
- Died: 18 June 1928 (aged 72); Tunbridge Wells, Kent
- Batting: Right-handed

Domestic team information
- Years: Team
- 1876-1886: Gloucestershire
- Source: Cricinfo, 4 April 2014

Alan Douglas Greene (15 April 1856 – 18 June 1928) was an English cricketer. He was educated at Clifton College, where he played cricket for the school, and Exeter College, Oxford, where he played for the University 1877–80, being captain in 1880. He played for Gloucestershire between 1876 and 1886.
