= Henry Tupper =

Captain Henry de Beauvoir Tupper AM (7 April 1883 – 14 November 1952) was a Royal Navy officer and recipient of the Albert Medal.

== Early life ==
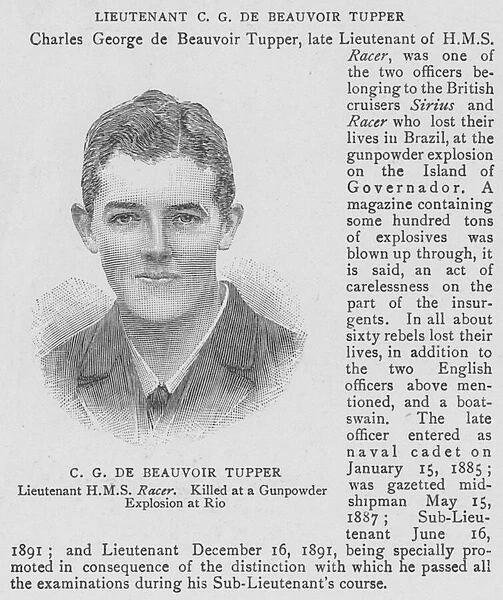
Obituary for his father Lieutenant C. G. de Beauvoir Tupper RN - The Graphic 1893

Henry de Beauvoir Tupper joined the Royal Navy after leaving Framlingham College, and was on 1 July 1902 posted as a midshipman to the pre-dreadnought battleship HMS Revenge, serving in home waters.

== First World War ==
He served in the First World War, rising to the rank of commander and was in command of HMS Scourge during the Gallipoli landings in April 1915.

While later serving on HMS Comet during the First World War, he performed an act for which he was awarded, on 21 February 1919, the Albert Medal for gallantry in saving life at sea (later replaced by the George Cross). He was awarded it jointly with Able Seaman ET Spalding. The citation reads as follows:

On 4 August 1918, HMS Comet, under the command of Commander Tupper, was seriously damaged in collision. The ship was badly holed on the starboard side, the deck and all compartments eventually filled with water as far as the engine room bulkhead and the stern was at any time liable to fall off. On being informed that the hydraulic release depth charge was set to “fire”, Commander Tupper sent away a man in a whaler to remove the primer. It was only possible to remove the primer from one of the charges, leaving the other depth charge about fifteen feet under water, still at “fire”. Commander Tupper then went away in a dinghy himself and by repeated diving operations tried to render it safe. After a rest he returned to complete the operation, in which Able Seaman Spalding, who was a passenger on the ship at the time and was a good swimmer, volunteered to assist. Commander Tupper at first refused to allow Able Seaman Spalding to assist him, as the later had no knowledge of depth charges and Commander Tupper did not consider it safe for him to go down. Ultimately Commander Tupper and Able Seaman Spalding swam to the spot beneath which the depth charge was submerged and alternately gave a turn to the iron bar which Commander Tupper had placed in the handle, until the primer was eventually unscrewed and taken out of the depth charge, thus rendering it safe. This operation was of the most dangerous nature, as at any moment the stern of the ship might have dropped off before the depth charge was removed and would have carried down both the Officer and the man, who would have inevitably lost their lives. The explosion would also have destroyed the remaining portion of the ship, with loss of life to those of the crew who were on board.
