= Witch trials in the Channel Islands =

The Channel Islands Witch Trials were a series of witch trials in the Channel Islands of Jersey and Guernsey between 1562 and 1661.

== Background ==
The Reformation saw the separation of the Church of England (or Anglican Church) from Rome under Henry VIII, beginning in 1529 and completed in 1537. In France John Calvin began publishing his thoughts in 1536 resulting in his fleeing the country, going first to Geneva then Strasbourg, where Calvinism became a significant religion with Switzerland, the Netherlands, Sweden and John David Jarvis in Guernsey adopting the religion in preference to the Roman Catholic Church from which they broke away. This led to persecution by Catholics of non-believers and the fleeing of members of the Reformed Church of France, the Huguenots, some of which found refuge in the Channel Islands.

The Islands had retained Roman Catholic Priests, partly due to the island churches being responsible to the Roman Catholic Diocese of Coutances, partly as a result of a shortage of French speaking Protestant priests and partly due to Mary, a Roman Catholic, being on the throne in England from 1553 to 1558.

During this period a number of Protestants fled the islands, Thomas Bertran, a Jersey Minister fleeing in 1556, a Guernsey merchant Guillaume de Beauvoir becoming a Dean of the English Church in Geneva in 1556, where John Knox and Christopher Goodman were the pastors. The highly influential English language Geneva Bible was first printed in that city in 1557. In Geneva John Calvin had people arrested, tortured, and executed. Suspected witches were also tortured and burnt by Protestant leaders, though more often they were banished from the city.

=== Guernsey Martyrs ===
In 1556 during the Marian persecutions under Mary I, the persecution of Protestants for their beliefs, three women Guillemine Gilbert and Perotine Massey were sisters, and their mother, Catherine Cauchés were tried for theft, for which they were found not guilty, however Perotine Massey was the wife of a Calvinist minister and all three were found guilty of holding religious views that were contrary to those required by the church authorities and burnt at the stake, Perotine giving birth to a baby boy in the flames. They became known as the Guernsey Martyrs.

=== Calvinism ===
The death of Mary I and the arrival of Elizabeth I of England coincided with the arrival of the Huguenots in the islands, with them came a number of French speaking priests of the Protestant Calvinist faith. The Bishop of Coutances lost his influence with the appointment of the Bishop of Winchester over the island churches, so ending all Catholic influence in the islands.

The Bailiff, Hellier Gosselin and the Roman Catholic élite of the island were subjected to a series of commissions and investigations encompassing not only the circumstances of the execution of the women, but also embezzlement; James Amy, the Dean, was committed to prison in Castle Cornet and dispossessed of his living. Hellier Gosselin was dismissed from his post in 1562 but along with the Jurats managed to obtain a pardon from Queen Elizabeth.

The French Wars of Religion from 1562 to 1598 increased the number of Protestant refugees arriving in the islands.

Calvinism is a very strict form of Protestantism and the islands found their churches being changed with the removal of paintings and religious symbols such as statues, decorated altars and fonts and the removal of crosses. By using the Ecclesiastical courts in the islands they enforced compulsory attendance at church twice every Sunday, bans of gambling and dancing and many other restrictions, especially on Sundays, upon pain of flogging, locking in stocks, imprisonment in the town cages or in castle dungeons.

== Witch Trials ==
Between 1550 and 1650 at least 100 people were accused of witchcraft in Guernsey. Torture was used to force a confession to practicing witchcraft, after which the convicted were flogged, banished, hanged, strangled or burnt at the stake.

George Reginald Balleine wrote about Witch Trials in Jersey, naming "the Witches' Rock at St. Clement", however his work is questioned as being naive about torture and resulting confessions.

Confessions in Guernsey showed the devil appearing as a cat, a dog, a hare, a rat, a weasel, or a goat and even as a masked man in daylight.

- Ann of St Brelade in 1562 was the first witch trial in Jersey.
- Paquette Le Vesconte, from Jersey, who had previously been arrested for witchcraft and banished from the island, returned and still using "diabolical devices and spells", was rearrested and "confessed that she had entered into partnership with the Devil, and by his help perpetrated innumerable crimes and homicides".
- Jean Morant in Jersey, confessed to "a contract with the Devil.. by mark and pact.. by means of which he had committed infinite mischiefs, crimes and homicides".
- Symon Vaudin in Jersey, confessed that he "had at divers times help familiar intercourse and talks with the Devil, who appeared as a cat and then as a crow".
- Marie Tougis in Jersey, confessed "that she had caused the death of a child and bewitched a woman".
- Peronelle Chevallier, wife of Robert Falla, was condemned to be "strangled at the post at the place of execution and there be burnt and her body consumed and reduced to ash and all her goods and property confiscated into the hands of our sovereign lady the Queen" Elizabeth I, in Jersey in 1597.
- Elizabeth Grandin from Jersey was arrested for witchcraft but released with a warning "not to gad about the island".
- Marie de Callais, from Calais Lane, St Martin in Guernsey was convicted of witchcraft, one of several in the coven at Le Châté Rocquôine and burnt at the stake on 17 October 1617. Two of her family were banished.
- Mary Blanche, of a good family who lived in the area Les Blanches in St Martin, Guernsey, was condemned as a witch by the then Bailiff, Amice de Carteret and died in October 1622.
- Thomas Tougis, Jouane Tougis, his daughter, and Michelle Chivret wife of Pierre Osmont were accused in 1622 of "long practised the horrible and heinous crime of sorcery" and kept imprisoned at Castle Cornet in Guernsey whilst "examined on various particulars", found guilty of having "committed various murders, smitten with debility several persons, made die many animals, and perpetrated a number of injuries", they were sentenced to be executed by being tied to a post on a scaffold, then burnt to death.
- Isabel Becquet confessed "a woman she did not know", then "six others whom she also did not know" to be witches, she, along with her daughter Marie "were condemned to be taken with halters round their necks to the place of execution, there tied by the executioner to a post, and strangled and then burnt until their flesh and bones are reduced to ashes and the ashes scattered".
- Marie Esnouf was the granddaughter of the Rector of Saint John, Jersey, but was executed in 1648, after having her head shaven, and witches marks found.

The trials ceased with the Act of Uniformity 1662 of Charles II of England which imposed the Book of Common Prayer and brought together Anglican and non-conformist religions, although it took a few years in the islands due to the spoken language being French.

Not all deaths were the result of trials. In Jersey "Elizabeth Gavey was buried on the 29th day (of March 1765). She was found dead on the morning of the 28th near La Mare d'Angot at Ville a l'Eveque. Killed by miserable superstitious people accusing her of sorcery who after having cruelly mistreated her caused her to die, throwing there her poor body. She was a poor innocent, who was thus born and lived all her life a poor innocent."

There is a link to the Salem witch trials, Philippe d'Anglois (Philip English), was born in Jersey of Huguenot descent and emigrated to Salem in the 1670s and was one of those arrested.

The last witch trial in Jersey was John Jarvis in 1736 by which time at least 66 had been accused in the island.

== See also ==
- Witch trials in England
