= Mary W. Hicks =

American psychology professor

- Mary A. Ward, from a 1942 newspaper photo
- Born: 1920; Nyssa, Oregon
- Died: about 2018
- Occupation: College professor

Mary Ward Hicks (1920 – circa 2018) was an American psychologist specializing in family therapy, and a professor emerita at Florida State University.

== Early life and education ==
Mary Agnes Ward was born in Nyssa, Oregon and raised in Weiser, Idaho, the daughter of George P. Ward and Marian E. McDonald Ward (later Gribbin). She graduated from Payette High School in 1938. She attended Whitman College and studied education as an undergraduate at the University of Idaho, graduating in 1942. She was a member of the Delta Gamma sorority at Idaho.

Hicks earned a master's degree in educational psychology at the University of California, Berkeley, in 1953, and completed a Ph.D. in child development and family relations at Pennsylvania State University. Her 1966 doctoral dissertation was An empirical evaluation of textbook assumptions about engagement. Her doctoral advisor was Carlfred Broderick.

== Career ==
Hicks taught at Gooding High School after college. She taught at the University of British Columbia, Pennsylvania State University, Southern Illinois University, and Virginia Tech. She joined the Florida State University faculty in 1973. She was a professor of family and child sciences, and training director for the interdivisional doctoral program in family therapy. As director of the university's Marriage and Family Therapy Center, she commented on changing laws around marriage in the news, and spoke at community events.

== Recognition ==
Hicks was the 1974 winner of the Ernest G. Osborne Teaching Award of the National Council on Family Relations, and the 2003 winner of the Training Award of the American Association for Marriage and Family Therapy. In 1995, she received the Distinguished Service to Families Award from the Southeastern Council on Family Relations. She was elected president of the Groves Conference on Marriage and Family in 1993, and named as a lifetime member of the Conference in 2011. An outdoor bench at Florida State is dedicated with a plaque in her honor. There is a Mary Hicks Endowed Scholarship Fund at Florida State, to support doctoral students in the Marriage and Family Therapy program.

== Personal life ==
Mary Ward married poultry geneticist Amp Frank Hicks Jr., in 1945. They met while he was at a hospital in Utah, and she was a Red Cross worker there, during World War II. They had two daughters, Lorna and Julie. Mary Ward died in 2017, at the age of 97.

== Selected publications ==
- Hicks, Mary W.; Platt, Marilyn (1970). "Marital happiness and stability: a review of the research in the sixties". Journal of Marriage and Family. 32 (4): 553–574. doi:10.2307/350251. JSTOR 350251.
- Sporakowski, Michael J.; Hicks, Mary W., eds. (1976). Families, Individuals and Marriage. Dubique, Iowa: Kendall/Hunt.
- Darling, Carol A.; Hicks, Mary W. (1982). "Parental influence on adolescent sexuality: Implications for parents as educators". Journal of Youth and Adolescence. 11 (3): 231–245. doi:10.1007/BF01537469. ISSN 1573-6601. PMID 12338446. S2CID 44453286.
- Hicks, Mary W.; Hansen-Gandy, Sally; Nichols, William C., eds. (1988). Coping with Victimization. New York: Human Sciences Press. ISBN 0-89885-462-8. OCLC 65406196. Also published as Volume 10, issue 4 of Contemporary Family Therapy, December 1988.
- Cluff, Richard B.; Hicks, Mary W.; Madsen, Charles H. (1994). "Beyond the circumplex model, I: a moratorium on curvilinearity". Family Process. 33 (4): 455–470. doi:10.1111/j.1545-5300.1994.00455.x. ISSN 1545-5300. PMID 7698308.
