= Charles Austin (lawyer) =

English lawyer

Charles Austin, QC (1799–1874) was an English barrister. A leader of the parliamentary bar, he was prominent in the Railway Mania of the later 1840s. According to Patrick Polden, his "career ridiculed the noble ideals of the bar".

== Early life ==
Austin was the second son of Jonathan Austin, of Creeting Mill, in the county of Suffolk; John Austin was his elder brother. He was educated at Bury St Edmunds Grammar School. He was for a time apprenticed to a surgeon at Norwich, but was then sent to Jesus College, Cambridge, in 1819. He was President of the Cambridge Union Society in 1822. In 1822 he won the Hulsean prize for an essay on Christian evidence. In 1824 he graduated BA According to John Stuart Mill, Austin as undergraduate was an influential exponent of the ideas of Jeremy Bentham; and he had a reputation for brilliance as one of a group of contemporaries that included Thomas Babington Macaulay, Winthrop Mackworth Praed, John Moultrie, Edward Strutt, John Romilly, Charles Buller, and Alexander James Edmund Cockburn.

== Lawyer ==
Having chosen law as a profession, Austin entered as a student at the Middle Temple, read in the chambers of Sir William Follett, then in the height of his fame as an advocate, and was called to the bar in 1827. He joined the Norfolk circuit, and went to the Ipswich, Bury, and Norwich sessions. His conversational powers were highly regarded. He wrote for the Parliamentary History and Review, and contributed occasionally to the Retrospective Review and the Westminster Review, until his rapid success as a barrister.

Austin was the undisputed leader of the parliamentary bar, the group of barristers who specialised in private bill procedure. In 1847, at the height of the railway mania, his income was enormous — estimates vary from £40,000 to £100,000.

It was the wish of Austin's friends that he should enter parliament, and James Mill used his influence with Joseph Hume in order to get him returned for Bath; but Austin never stood as a candidate. He also refused the solicitor-generalship in 1834. In 1841 he was made Queen's Counsel.

== Later life ==
In 1848 he retired from practice with a large fortune. From that time to that of his death he lived in retirement. He had Brandeston Hall, seriously damaged in a fire of 1847, rebuilt. He was High Steward of Ipswich and chairman of the quarter-sessions of East Suffolk.

He married, in 1856, Harriet Jane, daughter of Captain Ralph Mitford Preston Ingelby. He died at Brandeston Hall, near Wickham Market, on 21 December 1874.

== Bibliography ==
This article incorporates text from a publication now in the public domain: Stephen, Leslie, ed. (1885). "Austin, Charles". Dictionary of National Biography. Vol. 2. London: Smith, Elder & Co.
