= Framlingham Mere =

Suffolk Wildlife Trust nature reserve

Coordinates: 52.223°N 1.341°E

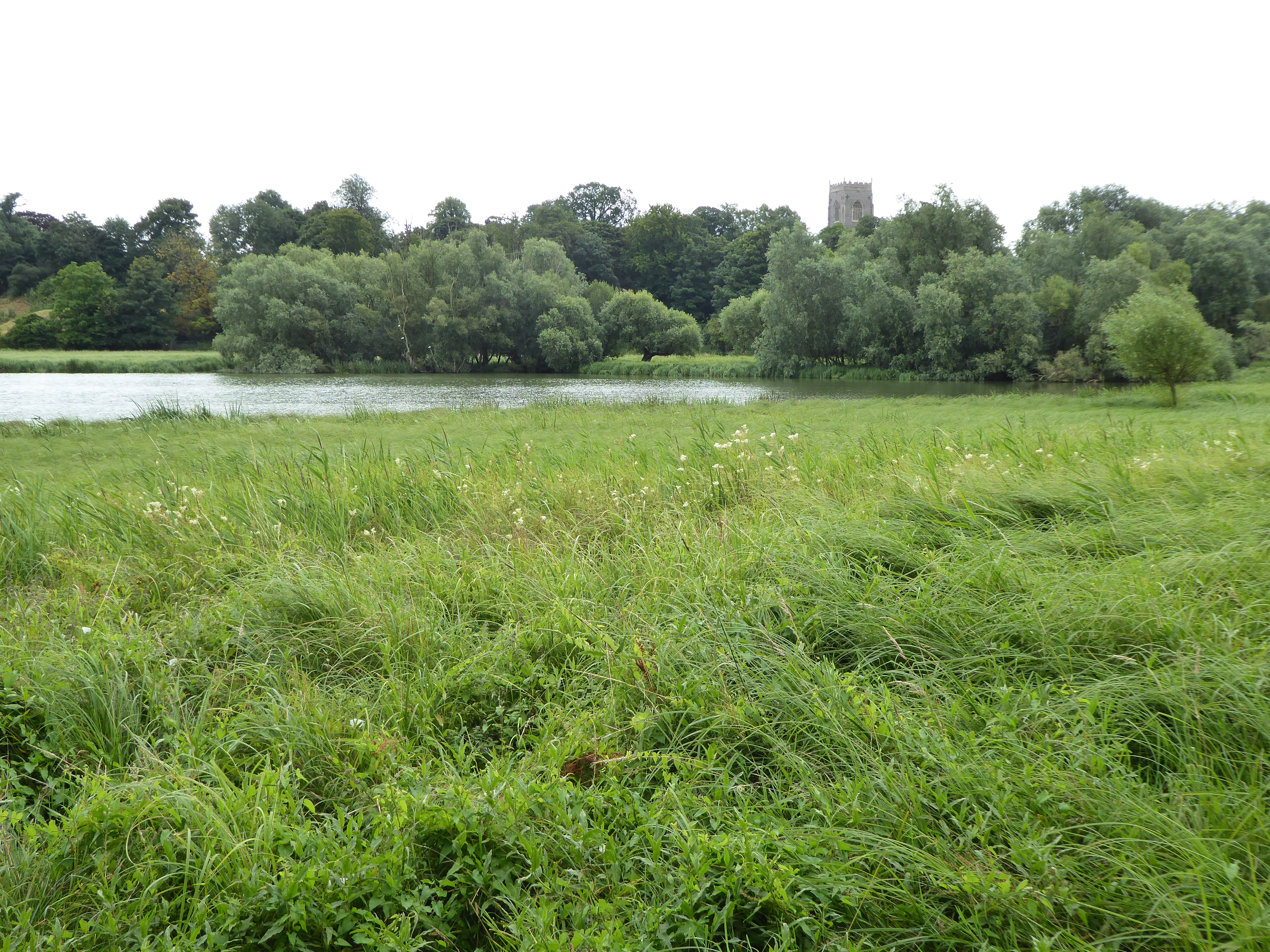
- Interactive map of Framlingham Mere
- Type: Nature reserve
- Location: Framlingham, Suffolk
- Area: 13.8 hectares (34 acres)
- Manager: Suffolk Wildlife Trust

Framlingham Mere is a 13.8-hectare nature reserve in Framlingham in Suffolk. It is managed by Framlingham College.

This site has a lake and wet meadows adjoining Framlingham Castle, with water running into, and out of the mere, via the River Ore. There are many migrating birds, and flora include marsh marigolds, ragged-robin and lady's smock. There is access from New Road and by a footpath past the castle from Badingham Road.
