= Bideford witch trial =

1682 trial of three women for witchcraft in England

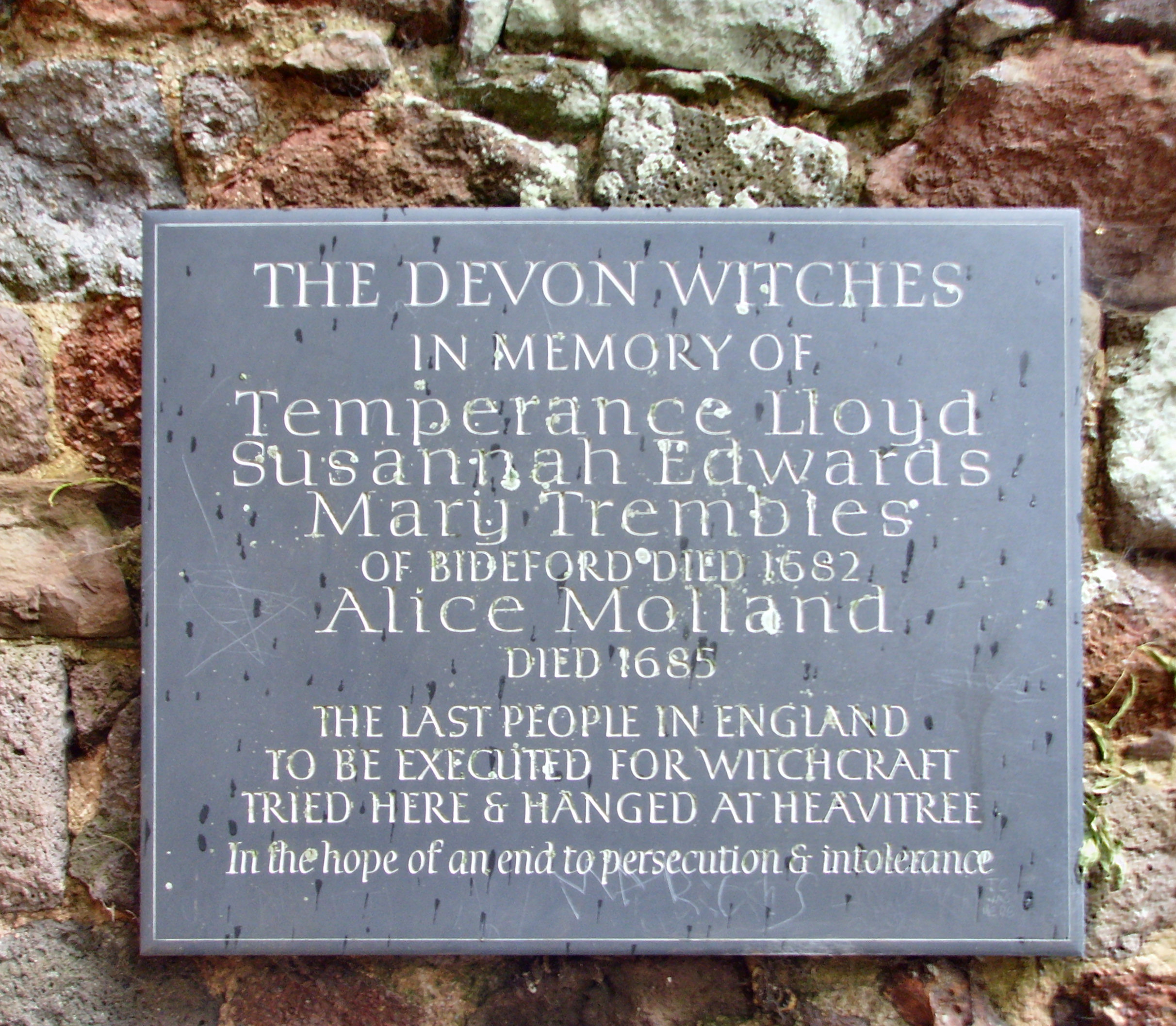
A plaque commemorating Lloyd, Edwards, Trembles, and Alice Molland on the wall of Rougemont Castle in Exeter.

The Bideford witch trial resulted in hangings for witchcraft in England. Temperance Lloyd, Mary Trembles and Susannah Edwards from the town of Bideford in Devon were tried in 1682 at the Exeter Assizes at Rougemont Castle. Much of the evidence against them was hearsay, although there was a confession by Lloyd, which she did not fully recant even with her execution imminent. These women have been labelled as the last people to be hanged in England for witchcraft. (Note: It is sometimes said that Alice Molland was the last person to be sentenced to death for witchcraft in England; she was condemned to execution at Heavitree, Devon, in 1685, but unlike the three Bideford women there is no evidence that she was in fact executed. The plaque (illustrated above) in Exeter Castle, the venue for her trial and conviction, also notes the names of the Bideford victims from 1682.)

== Investigation of Temperance Lloyd ==
On Saturday, July 1682, Thomas Eastchurch, a Bideford shopkeeper, complained to some of the town's constables that Temperance Lloyd had been practising witchcraft. The constables arrested Temperance Lloyd and locked her in the old chapel at the end of the bridge, where she remained until taken before the justices, Thomas Gist, Mayor of Bideford, and John Davie, Alderman, on the Monday morning. The charges were: "suspicion of having used some magical art, sorcery or witchcraft upon the body of Grace Thomas and to have had discourse or familiarity with the devil in the likeness or shape of a black man". Grace Thomas thought that Temperance Lloyd was responsible for her illness, because the previous September, Lloyd had wept with joy and expressed pleasure in seeing that Thomas had regained her health.

=== Anne Wakely's evidence ===
Another woman, Anne Wakely, had seen a magpie fly to Thomas's chamber window. Suspecting witchcraft, she questioned Lloyd, and found her in the company of another. They found "in her secret parts two teats hanging nigh together like unto a piece of flesh that a child had sucked. And that each of the teat was about an inch in length."

All the other evidence against Lloyd was hearsay, mostly claims to have overheard confessions by her. There were six such statements, including a claim by Anne Wakely that Lloyd was visited by the "black man" in the form of a bird. Wakely also said that Lloyd told her the black man had sucked at her extra teats.

=== Thomas Eastchurch's evidence ===
Thomas Eastchurch's statement was held to be important, as he was a respected town gentleman; however, again his evidence was simply that he overheard Lloyd confess while she was in Bideford lock-up the previous day. He stated that she confessed to meeting "something in the likeness of a black man" who tempted her to go and torment Grace Thomas. Eastchurch claimed that at first she refused but then agreed, following him to Thomas's home where the black man told her to pinch Thomas several times. She is then said, on leaving the house, to have seen a tabby cat go into Eastchurch's shop; she believed it to be the Devil.

At a later date, she met the black man again, who told her to kill Thomas, "whereupon Temperance did go to his house with the black man and that she went into the chamber where Grace Thomas lay, and further did confess that she did pinch and prick Grace Thomas again in several parts of her body, declaring with both of her hands how she did do it, and that thereupon Grace Thomas did cry out terribly". The black man, according to Eastchurch's statement, had told Lloyd she would be invisible during this attack. He also claimed that another, similar attack on Thomas followed.

Eastchurch then gave evidence that Grace Thomas sought medical help for her complaints.

==== Image magic ====
His wife Elizabeth, Grace's sister, stated that Thomas found nine pricks in her knee, and suspecting witchcraft, confronted Lloyd, who replied that she had pricked a piece of leather nine times.

The justices gave their permission for Lloyd to be questioned by the rector, Michael Ogilby. Although she confessed to turning into a cat, stealing a doll and placing it in Thomas's bedchamber, she denied using image magic despite specific questioning by Ogilby.

=== William Herbert's statement ===
William Herbert was the final witness against Temperance Lloyd. On 2 February 1671, he had heard his father William "declare on his deathbed that Temperance Lloyd... had bewitched him unto death". After he died, William saw marks on his body, and had Lloyd charged with witchcraft; she was acquitted at the ensuing trial.

=== Temperance Lloyd's evidence ===
On 3 July Temperance Lloyd was herself questioned by the justices, and she admitted all the charges made against her. The following day, in prison she admitted killing William Herbert, Lydia Burman and Anne Fellow, and blinding Jane Dallyn in one eye. She admitted all of this as she believed she was still under the black man's protection.

=== Exeter ===
On 8 July Temperance Lloyd was committed to Exeter Gaol to await trial for witchcraft. At the trial she maintained her guilt.

At the execution, she tried to give a reason for her actions: "the Devil met me in the street, and bid me kill her, and because I would not he beat me about the head and back".

== Investigation of Mary Trembles and Susanna Edwards ==
Mary Trembles and Susanna Edwards were investigated after a local woman, Grace Barnes, blamed Trembles for her illness. On 18 July 1682, Mary Trembles was denounced to the authorities and consequently arrested, along with Susanna Edwards, who had accompanied Trembles while they were begging for food (there was a food shortage in the country at the time).

At the inquiry, Grace Barnes's husband John spoke first, accusing Trembles of hurting his wife by witchcraft. William Edwards also spoke, claiming to have overheard a confession by Susanna. People came to see the two women while they were in the town lock-up.

=== Anthony Jones's shaking fit ===
During Edwards's questioning, Anthony Jones, husband of Joan, drew attention to Edwards's nervously wringing her hands. He accused her of "now tormenting some person or other". He said her reply was, "Well enough, I will fit thee." He then left the Guildhall to help bring Grace Barnes to bear witness. On returning, Anthony Jones cried out "Wife, I am now bewitched by this devil!" and was overcome by a shaking fit during which he "leapt and capered like a madman", after which he fell unconscious for half an hour.

=== Confession of Mary Trembles ===
After this disturbance, Grace Barnes did not make her statement; instead the justices questioned Mary Trembles. She answered all their charges, confessing to witchcraft, but blaming Susanna Edwards for initiating her. Edwards followed with a confession of witchcraft, adding that she also tormented Dorcas Coleman, another local woman.

The following day, Wednesday 19 July, Anthony Jones was sufficiently recovered from his fit to make his own statement, giving a report of the previous morning's events. Later that day, Mary and Susanna were both searched for any suspicious marks on their bodies, then they were sent to Exeter to join Temperance Lloyd while awaiting their trial. Grace Barnes in her statement repeated the story and added that she had some suspicion of Susanna Edwards because she would often call on her husband's house for frivolous reasons, or sometimes none at all.

=== Statement by William Edwards ===
Most of the evidence against the two women came from the statements of William Edwards and Joan Jones, who both claimed to be reporting what they had overheard. William Edwards said that the previous day, 17 July, he did hear Susanna Edwards confess that the Devil had carnal knowledge of her body, and "that he had sucked her in her breast and in her secret parts. And further saith that he did hear her say that she and Mary Trembles did appear hand in hand invisible in John Barnes's house where Grace the wife of John Barnes did lie in a very sad condition. And further saith that he did then also hear Susanna say that she and Mary Trembles were at that time come to make an end of her."

=== Statement by Joan Jones ===
Joan Jones claimed to have overheard Edwards making a full confession of witchcraft to a visitor from Torrington. She then reported this matter to the justices. After the man, John Dunning, had left the Guildhall (without giving evidence), Jones elaborated on what she claimed to have heard: that Trembles asked Edwards how she had become a witch, and Edwards had replied that a man wearing clothes "all of black" had offered that she would never be in want if only she did one thing for him – and that when she asked what, in God's name, that might be, the man vanished.

Jones then stated that she heard Tremble and Edwards discuss pricking Grace Barnes, and further claimed of Edwards: that the devil carried about Edwards's spirit; that the devil, in the form of a boy, suckled at her breast; and that the devil had had sex with her four times.

Jones also reported that Tremble argued with Edwards, accusing her of being made to be (or seem) a witch, and that she would lay the blame for this on Edwards.

Mary Trembles, in her confession, blamed Edwards for initiating her into witchcraft; Edwards in turn blamed Temperance Lloyd. Public opinion also turned more against Lloyd – "the woman that has debauched the other two".

While the two were in Exeter Gaol, stories of their dealing with the devil continued to circulate; a pamphlet of the time says, "They also asserted that the devil came with them to the prison door and there left them."

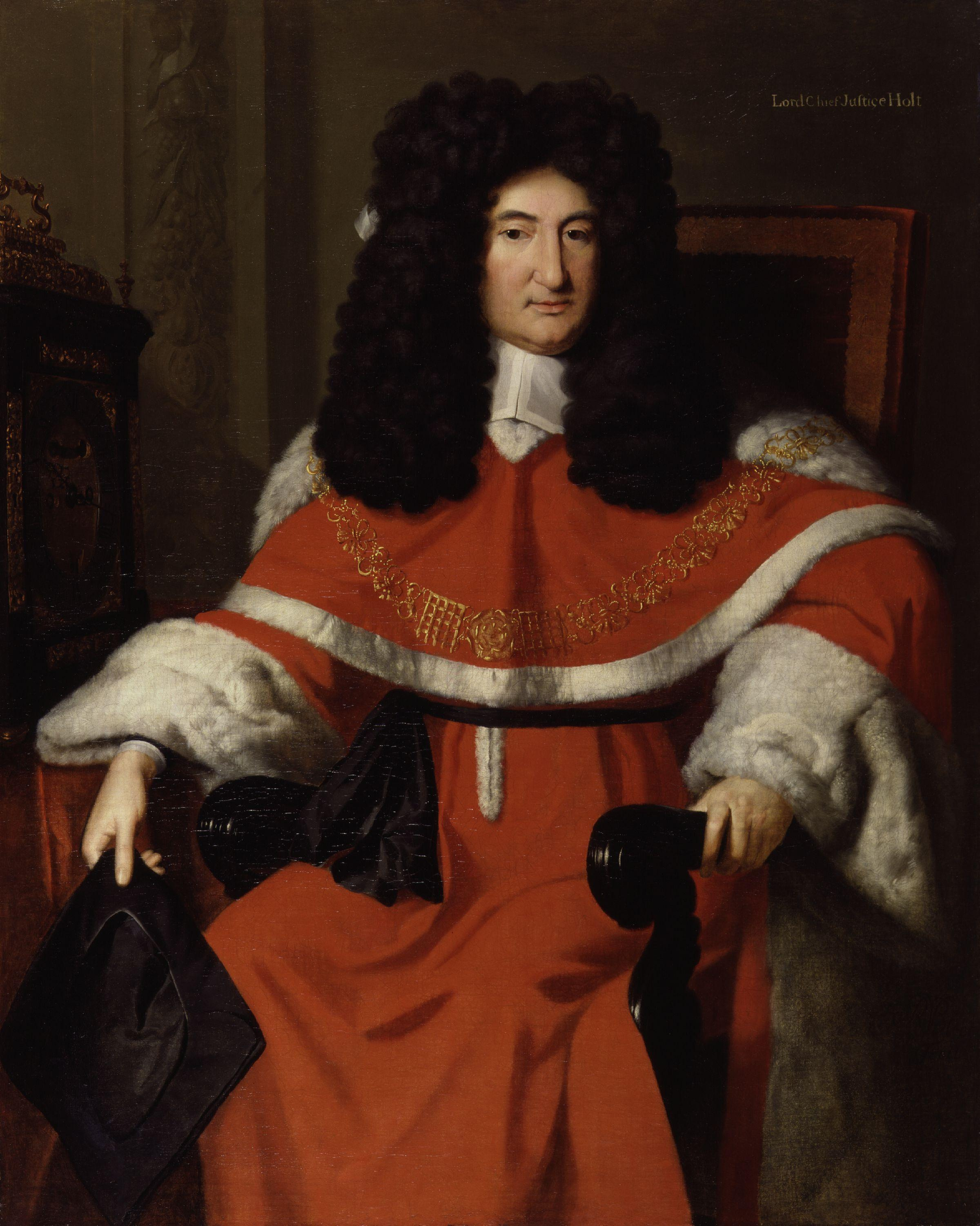
Jurist Sir John Holt by Richard van Bleeck, c. 1700. Holt greatly helped eliminate prosecutions for witchcraft in England after the Bideford witch trial.

=== Dorcas Coleman's statement ===
Towards the end of July four late statements were admitted to the record. The only one adding significant matter to the case was that of Dorcas Coleman, who recalled an illness she had suffered in 1680. A doctor was unable to help, and suggested witchcraft, perhaps to excuse his medical failings. Susanna Edwards was then called, and Coleman accused her of being her tormentor.

== Convictions and executions ==
The three women were tried before Sir Thomas Raymond, convicted by a jury, and sentenced to death. The women were hanged on 25 August 1682 at the Heavitree gallows outside of Exeter, and their bodies then dumped nearby in unconsecrated ground. Their death and burial locations are now within the car park of the St Luke's Campus of the University of Exeter.

== Political and religious influences ==
Historian John Callow argues in his 2022 book, The Last Witches of England, that the conviction and execution of the three women was influenced by political and religious tension between nonconformist Whigs, on the one hand, and the adherents of Anglican Toryism, on the other hand, in the West Country after the English Civil War.

=== End of witchcraft prosecutions ===
The Witchcraft Act 1735 finally concluded prosecutions for alleged witchcraft in England after sceptical jurists, especially Sir John Holt (1642–1710), had already largely ended convictions of alleged witches under English law.

== See also ==
- Burton at Bideford (museum in Bideford, UK, which has a permanent display concerning the trial)
- Witchcraft Acts (in England, Scotland, Wales, and Ireland)
- Salem witch trials (in Massachusetts, United States)
- Margaret Mattson (woman accused of witchcraft in the Province of Pennsylvania; acquitted by William Penn after trial in Philadelphia in 1683)
- Torsåker witch trials (in Sweden)
- Ramsele witch trial (in Sweden)
- North Berwick Witch Trial (in Scotland)
- Würzburg witch trial (in what is now Germany)
