= Jane Dodson =

English woman charged for witchcraft

Jane Dodson (fl. 1683) was an English woman who was charged for witchcraft. She was likely the last person to be formally charged with witchcraft in the city of London.

She was put on trial before the Old Bailey in London accused of having caused the illness of Mary Palmer and the death of another person by use of "divers Hellish Arts and Inchantations", that is to say sorcery. She was acquitted from the charges because the accusations could not be confirmed, and because she was a person with good reputation.

She was not the last person to be charged with sorcery in England, but she was by all accounts the last person to be indicted for the crime in the city of London.

== See also ==
- Joan Peterson
- Alice Molland
