= John Clubbe (priest) =

English cleric and satirical writer

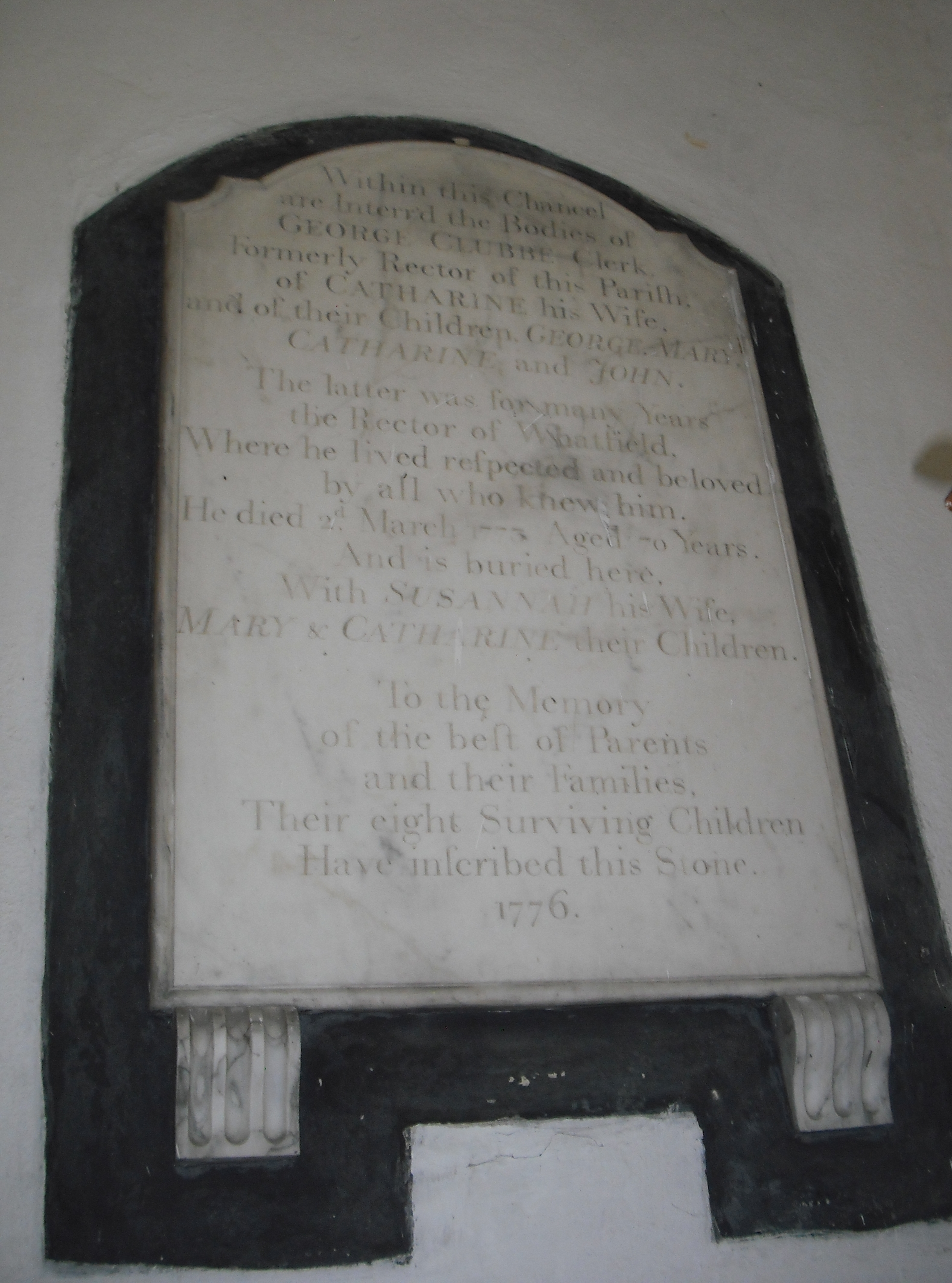
Memorial plaque to the Clubbe family at St Margaret's Church, Whatfield, Suffolk

John Clubbe (c.1703—1773) was an English cleric and satirical writer.

== Life ==
The son of the Rev. George Clubbe, rector of Whatfield, Suffolk, he was born in or about 1703. He matriculated as a sizar of King's College, Cambridge in 1722, and took the degree of B.A. in 1726. He was then ordained, became vicar of Debenham, Suffolk, in 1730, and five years later succeeded to his father's living of Whatfield.

Clubbe died on 2 March 1773, at the age of seventy.

== Works ==
Clubbe was reputed as a literary talent with a keen sense of humour. Apart from a sermon printed in 1751, all his writings were originally published anonymously, and included:

- The History and Antiquities of the Ancient Villa of Wheatfield, in the count of Suffolk, London, 1758, mainly a burlesque of Philip Morant's History and Antiquities of Colchester, and frequently reprinted.
- Physiognomy; a sketch of a larger work, London, 1763.
- A Letter of Free Advice to a Young Clergyman, Ipswich, 1765. These three works, with the Sermon and two other pieces, were published in two volumes Ipswich, (1770 or 1771), under the title of Miscellaneous Tracts of the Rev. John Clubbe.
- The Farmers’ Queries and Resolutions concerning the Game. Written in the second year of the Association for Preserving the Game, but never before published, Ipswich (1770?).

== Family ==
With his wife, Susannah Beeston, whom he married on 8 August 1732, Clubb had twelve children. Eight of whom, including John Clubbe, M.D., of Ipswich and William Clubbe, survived him.
