= Image magic =

Image magic is a tradition of magic in medieval Europe originating from the influx of Arabic texts in the twelfth and thirteenth centuries and focused on astrology. It serves as a major precursor to and was reinterpreted by the Hermetic Renaissance magical traditions, particularly the work of Marsilio Ficino.

The term astrological image first appears in the Speculum Astronomiae and refers to talismans created under specific astrological signs in order to draw down influence from astral spirits (i.e. the planets and stars embodied as the Aristotelian intelligences, and later the Neoplatonic planetary demons) for magical operation.

Image magic stands in contrast to medieval ritual magic and theurgy, particularly of the Solomonic tradition descending ultimately from the Testament of Solomon. The two competing traditions remained separate in manuscripts until the early Renaissance at which point they were often combined into single codexes.

As they originated from Arabic sources, image magic was often treated as a natural science manipulating the occult powers of nature rather that the invocation and necromancy associated with Solomonic ritual magic.
