= Framlingham College =

Public school in Suffolk, England

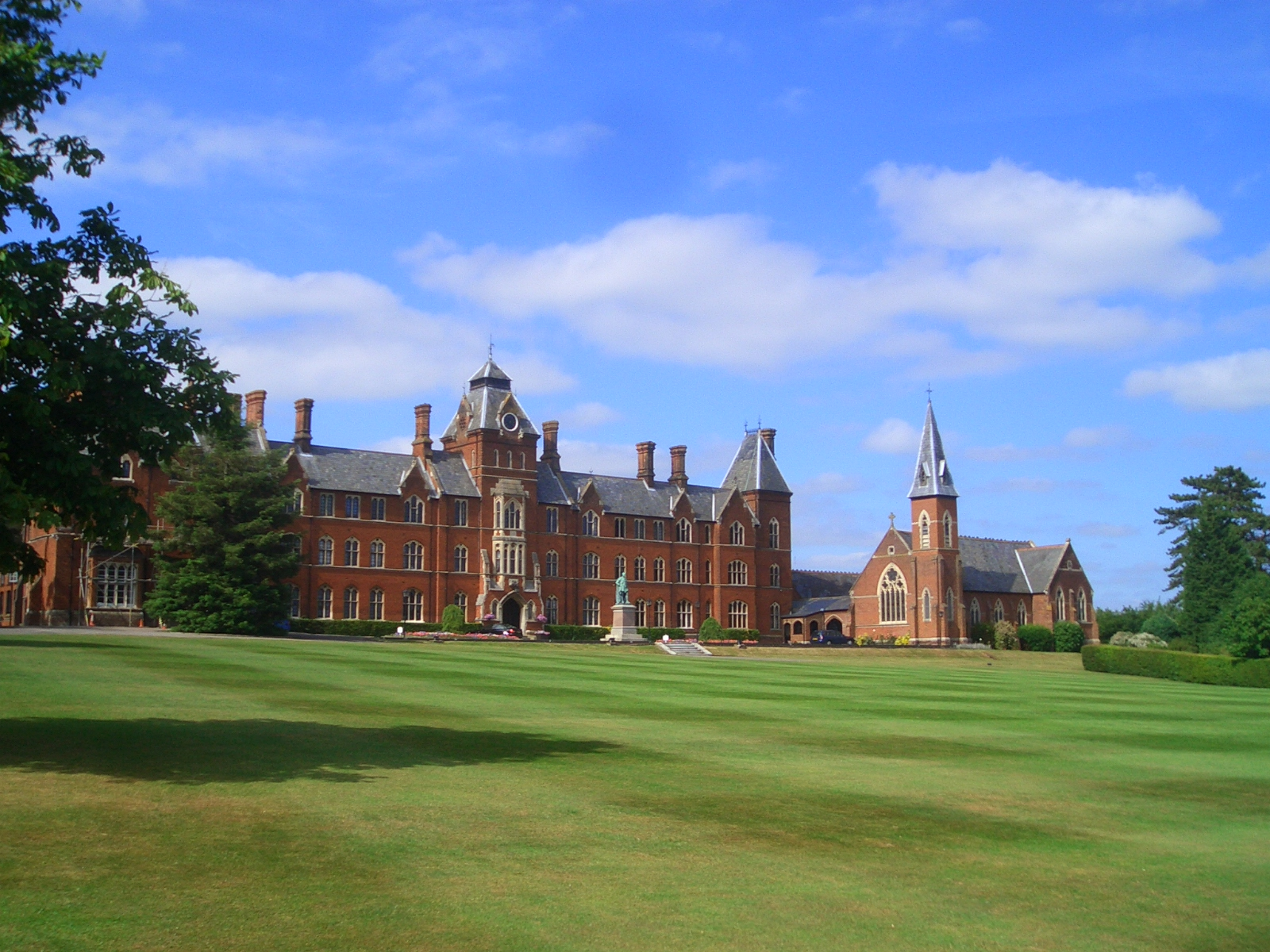

Location
- College Road; Framlingham near Woodbridge, Suffolk, IP13 9EY; England; 52°13′36″N 1°20′21″E

Information
- Former name: Albert Memorial College
- Type: Public school Private day and boarding
- Motto: Studio sapientia crescit (Wisdom grows with study)
- Religious affiliation: Church of England
- Established: 1864
- Trust: Mill Hill Education Group
- Department for Education URN: 124884 Tables
- Chairman of governors, Mill Hill Education Group: Elliot Lipton
- Principal: Louise North
- Staff: 81
- Gender: Coeducational
- Age range: 2 - 18
- Houses: 7
- Colours: Sky blue, Chocolate brown
- Slogan: Where every pupil creates their own story
- Former pupils: Old Framlinghamians
- Website: https://www.framlinghamcollege.co.uk

Framlingham College is a public school (boarding and day school) in the town of Framlingham, near Woodbridge, Suffolk, England. Together with its preparatory school and nursery at Brandeston Hall, it serves pupils from 2 to 18 years of age. Since March 2026, Framlingham College has been part of the Mill Hill Education Group of independent school.

== History ==
Framlingham College, originally the Albert Middle Class College in Suffolk, and known as the Albert Memorial College was founded in 1864 by public subscription as the Suffolk County Memorial to Queen Victoria's husband, Albert, Prince Consort, and was incorporated by royal charter. The individuals most involved in setting up of the school were Sir Edward Kerrison, 2nd Baronet, Richard Garrett and the Earl of Stradbroke. The land on which the college was built was originally part of the Framlingham Castle estate owned by Pembroke Hall, Cambridge. The architect was Fredrick Peck of Furnival's Inn, London. Built to accommodate 300 boys, the college opened its doors to pupils on 10 April 1865.

In J. R. de S. Honey's book Tom Brown's Universe: Public School in the Nineteenth Century, he reviewed the 64 leading public schools of the time and considered Framlingham as interacting less than it should with other leading schools.

In 1940, because of Framlingham's position close to the Suffolk coast, considered a likely site for a possible German invasion, and as a result of the crisis unfolding at Dunkirk, pupils from the college were evacuated for a short time to Repton School in Derbyshire.

The college's prep school at Brandeston Hall was opened by Princess Alice, Countess of Athlone in July 1949. The hall had been purchased and restored by the Society of Old Framlinghamians as a memorial to those of their number who died in the world wars.

== The school ==
Pupils are accommodated in seven boarding and day houses: three for girls and four for boys. The facilities at Framlingham College include a theatre with tiered seating for 250, a design and technology centre, a music department including various studios and recording facilities, a library, a sixth-form centre which opened in 2014, a leisure centre that houses an indoor swimming pool, a fitness suite and weights room. The original library, which was given to the college by Charles H. Berners in 1899, was extended in 1998.

The school has two campuses situated on approximately 135 acres. Between the college and Framlingham Castle lies the 34-acre Framlingham Mere, a nature reserve owned by the college and managed by Suffolk Wildlife Trust. The prep school campus at Brandeston Hall is a mock Tudorbethan hall set in its own grounds, facing the medieval All Saints' Church, Brandeston.

Louise North became principal of Framlingham College and Head of the Senior School in September 2019. Before that she was a Deputy Head at Oakham School, Rutland.

The school received an Outstanding Ofsted report in February 2011 and an excellent Independent Schools Inspectorate Report in February 2015.

== Sport ==
Framlingham College campus includes an indoor swimming pool, multi-gym, weights room and large playing fields. Other facilities include a modern sports hall; two floodlit artificial hockey pitches; an indoor rifle range; tennis, netball and squash courts; and a golf course. Home matches for golf are played at Aldeburgh Golf Club. The cricket square hosted an England XI in 2010. Framlingham College has been named in The Cricketer's Schools Guide (formerly the Top 100 Cricketing Schools list) every year since the guide's inception, including in 2020 and 2026, making it the only school in Norfolk and Suffolk to have appeared in every edition. The major sports are rugby, hockey, cricket, athletics and tennis for boys, and hockey, netball and tennis for girls. The girls also have a cricket team and have an annual fixture against the MCC.

Hockey has been particularly successful for the college in recent years. The girls' 1st XI won bronze at the Investec National Hockey Finals at the Olympic Park in March 2017, their third consecutive appearance in the national finals. The under-16 girls were crowned England Hockey Indoor National Champions in January 2022, beating Repton School in the final. The under-19 girls' team won the Independent Schools Hockey Cup Championship in 2023, beating Haileybury 5–1 in the final at Lee Valley. In 2026 the under-13 boys' team won both the IAPS National Hockey Championship and the In2Hockey National Finals, beating Whitgift 4–3 in the latter final.

Pupils can also take part in golf, squash, football, badminton, athletics, basketball, swimming, archery, shooting, canoeing, table tennis, and equestrian.

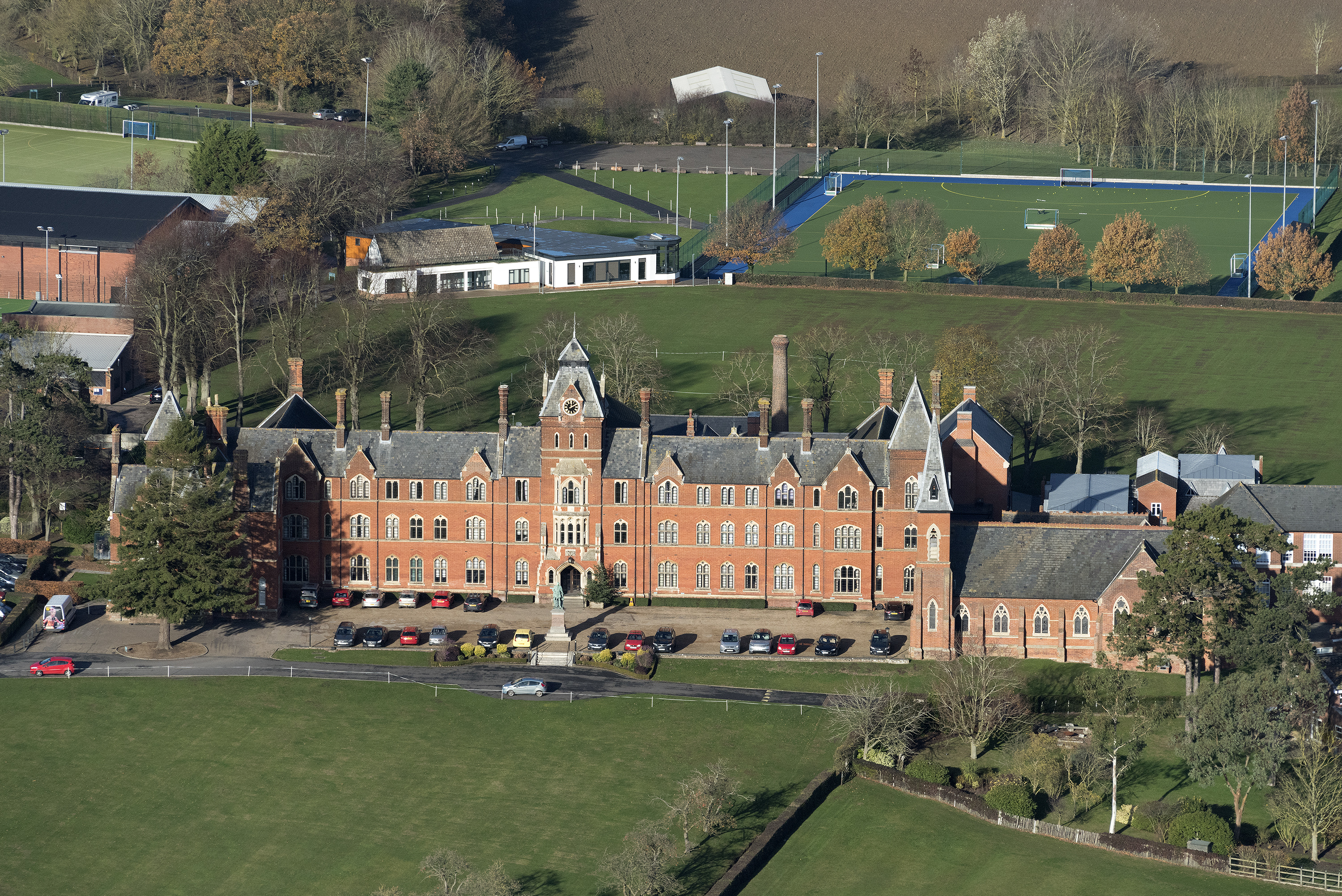
Aerial view

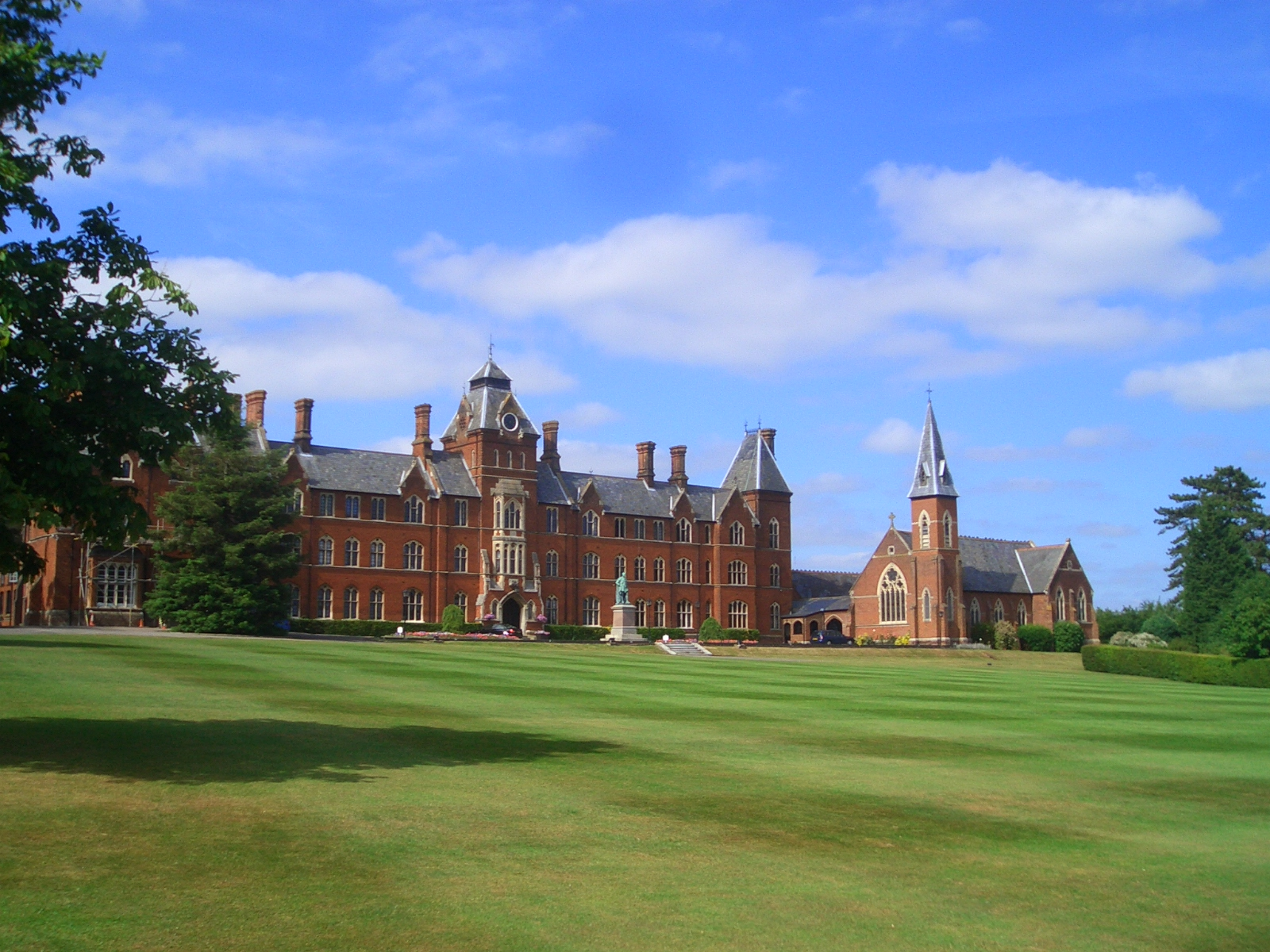

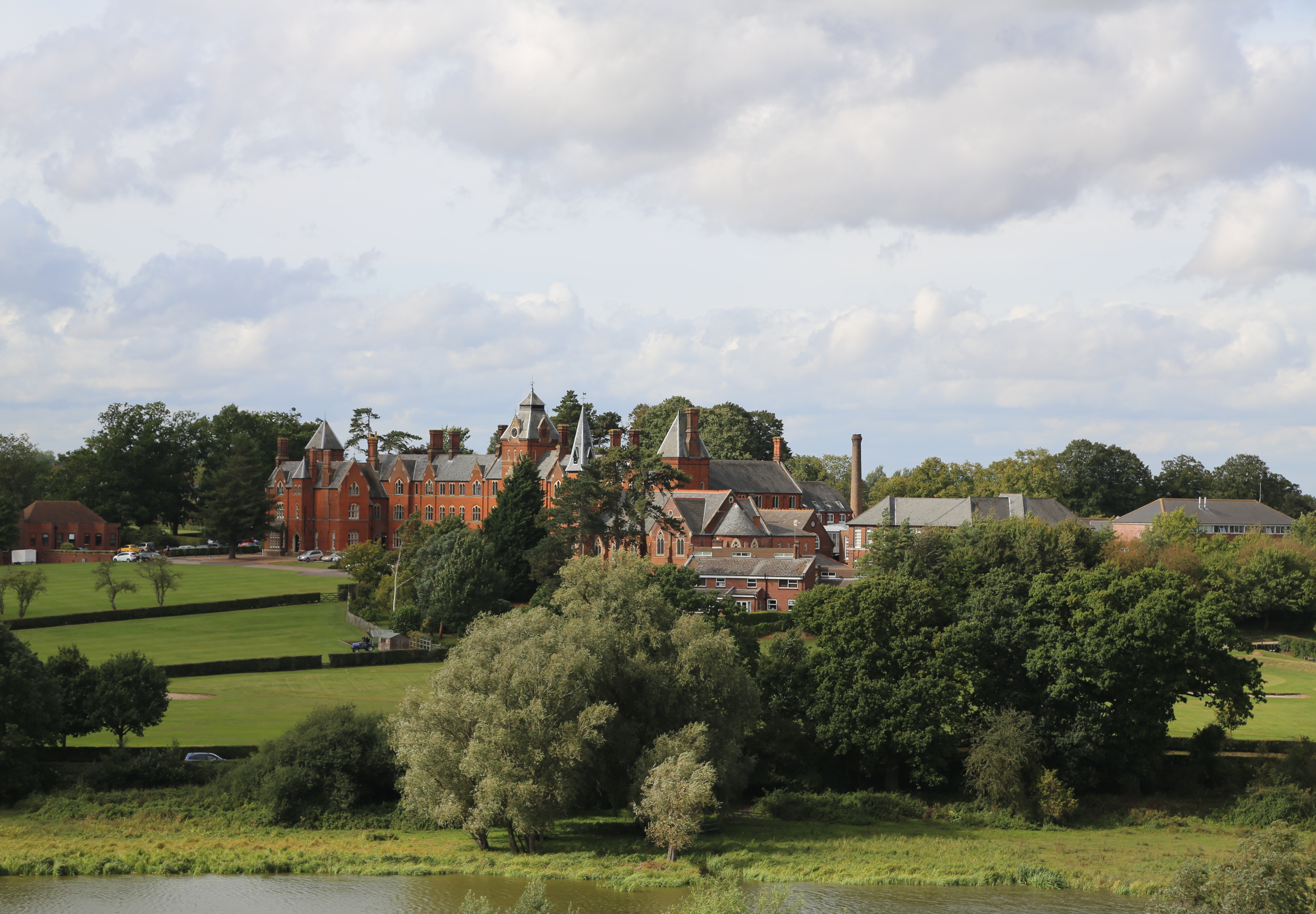
School seen from Framlingham Castle

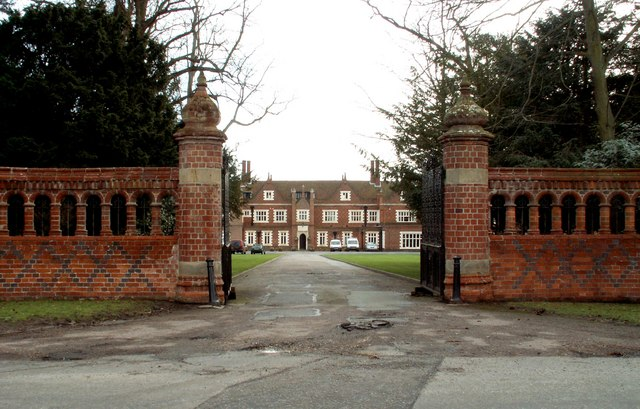
Brandeston Hall

== List of Heads ==
- 1864–1871 A. C. Daymond
- 1872–1881 W. W. Bird
- 1881–1886 A. H. Scott-White
- 1887–1913 O. D. Inskip
- 1913–1929 F. W. Stocks
- 1929–1940 W. H. A. Whitworth
- 1941–1955 R. W. Kirkman
- 1955–1971 W. S. Porter
- 1971–1989 L. I. Rimmer
- 1989–1994 J. F. X. Miller
- 1994–2009 G. M. Randall
- 2009–2019 P. B. Taylor
- 2019– J. L. M. North.

== In the media ==
Framlingham College was the subject of a Channel 4 documentary called Classmates in 2003. The buildings and interiors of Framlingham College were used in series 2 of the BBC comedy Detectorists, first broadcast in November 2015.

== Notable Old Framlinghamians ==
- Jack Abbot, Labour MP for Ipswich
- Charles Alderton, American pharmacist, and the creator of the carbonated soft drink Dr Pepper.
- Brian Aldiss, science fiction author
- Norman Borrett, Schoolmaster and accomplished sportsman. Described by the Times as "arguably Britain's most talented post-war all-round amateur sportsman".
- David Bull, former Chairman of Reform UK and television presenter
- Alain de Cadenet, former racing driver and television presenter
- Herbert St Maur Carter, Royal Army Medical Corps surgeon decorated by the British and Serbian governments
- Daisy Cooper, Deputy Leader of the Liberal Democrats and MP for St Albans
- Ashley Cowan, former Essex County Cricket Club cricketer
- Valentine Crittall, 1st Baron Braintree, MP
- Stanley Dance, biographer of Duke Ellington, record producer
- George Sampson Elliston, Conservative MP for Blackburn, Member of the Corporation of London
- Len Evans, 'Godfather of Australian Wine'
- Andrew Freemantle, chief executive of RNLI
- William Hale-White, Guy's physician; writer of Materia Medica (1895)
- William Bate Hardy, renowned biologist and physiologist, Vice President of the Royal Society
- Arthur Vere Harvey, Baron Harvey of Prestbury, MP
- Mark Hedley, High Court Judge
- Sao Hkun Hkio, The Sawbwa of Möng Mit, Burma
- Patrick Howard-Dobson, Vice Chief of the Defence Staff, President of the Royal British Legion
- Tim Inskip, British Indian Army major-general and cricketer
- Christina Johnston, soprano with the Prague State Opera
- Prince Constantin Karadja, Romanian diplomat and Righteous Among the Nations
- David Larter, Northamptonshire & England cricketer
- Alistair Cooke, Baron Lexden, Conservative historian and politician
- Walter Miecznikowski, English football player
- Alfred James Munnings, (1878–1959), artist
- Rob Newton, Northamptonshire County Cricket Club cricketer
- Keito Okamoto, Japanese singer and member of the group Hey! Say! JUMP
- James Paice, Conservative MP 1987–2015, Minister of State at the Department for Environment, Food and Rural Affairs 2010–2012
- Colonel John Henry Patterson (author), Railway engineer, British Army officer, explorer, and author who became famous for his book, The Man-eaters of Tsavo, which recounts the harrowing events of the man-eating lions in Tsavo, Kenya, during the construction of the Uganda Railway.
- Percy Charles Pickard, World War II pilot and leader of Operation Jericho
- Henry Pryce Jackman, composer
- Barry Purves, Academy Award-nominated animator, director and screenwriter
- Stuart Rossiter, writer and postal historian
- Charlie Simpson, musician, Busted and Fightstar
- Imogen Slaughter, actress
- Harry George Smart, Commander, British Forces in Iraq
- Jeremy Sullivan, Lord Justice of Appeal and Senior President of Tribunals
- William Vale
- William Robertson Warren, 7th Prime Minister of Newfoundland (1923-1924), 19th Speaker of the Newfoundland House of Assembly (1909-1914)
- Laura Wright, singer and former member of All Angels
- Ivor Noël Hume, archaeologist
- Kenneth Mayhew, World War II veteran, decorated with the highest honour of the Kingdom of the Netherlands
- The Wizard of New Zealand (Ian Brackenbury Channel), New Zealand icon and educator

=== Victoria Cross and George Cross recipients ===
Three Old Framlinghamians have won the Victoria Cross, and one the George Cross (converted from the Albert Medal).

==== Recipients of the Victoria Cross ====
- Gordon Muriel Flowerdew (1885–1918). Awarded for a cavalry charge in March 1918, in France in the First World War, from which he died of his wounds the following day. This was the last British cavalry charge in military history.
- William Henry Hewitt (1885–1966). Awarded for an attack on a pillbox in September 1917.
- Augustus Willington Shelton Agar, RN (1890–1968). Awarded for an attack on the Russian Navy in June 1919 at Kronstadt, Russia, in the North Russia Campaign.

==== Recipients of the George Cross ====
- Henry De Beauvoir Tupper. Awarded the Albert Medal (later replaced by the George Cross) on 21 February 1919, for gallantry in saving lives at sea on 4 August 1918 while serving on HMS Comet during World War I.
