= Witch trials in England =

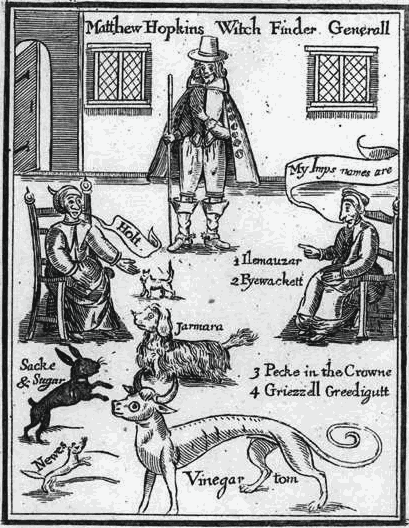
Frontispiece from the Matthew Hopkins's The Discovery of Witches (1647), showing witches identifying their familiar spirits

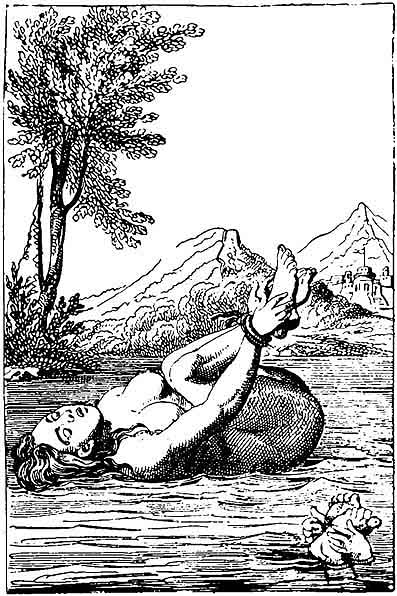
Ordeal of water

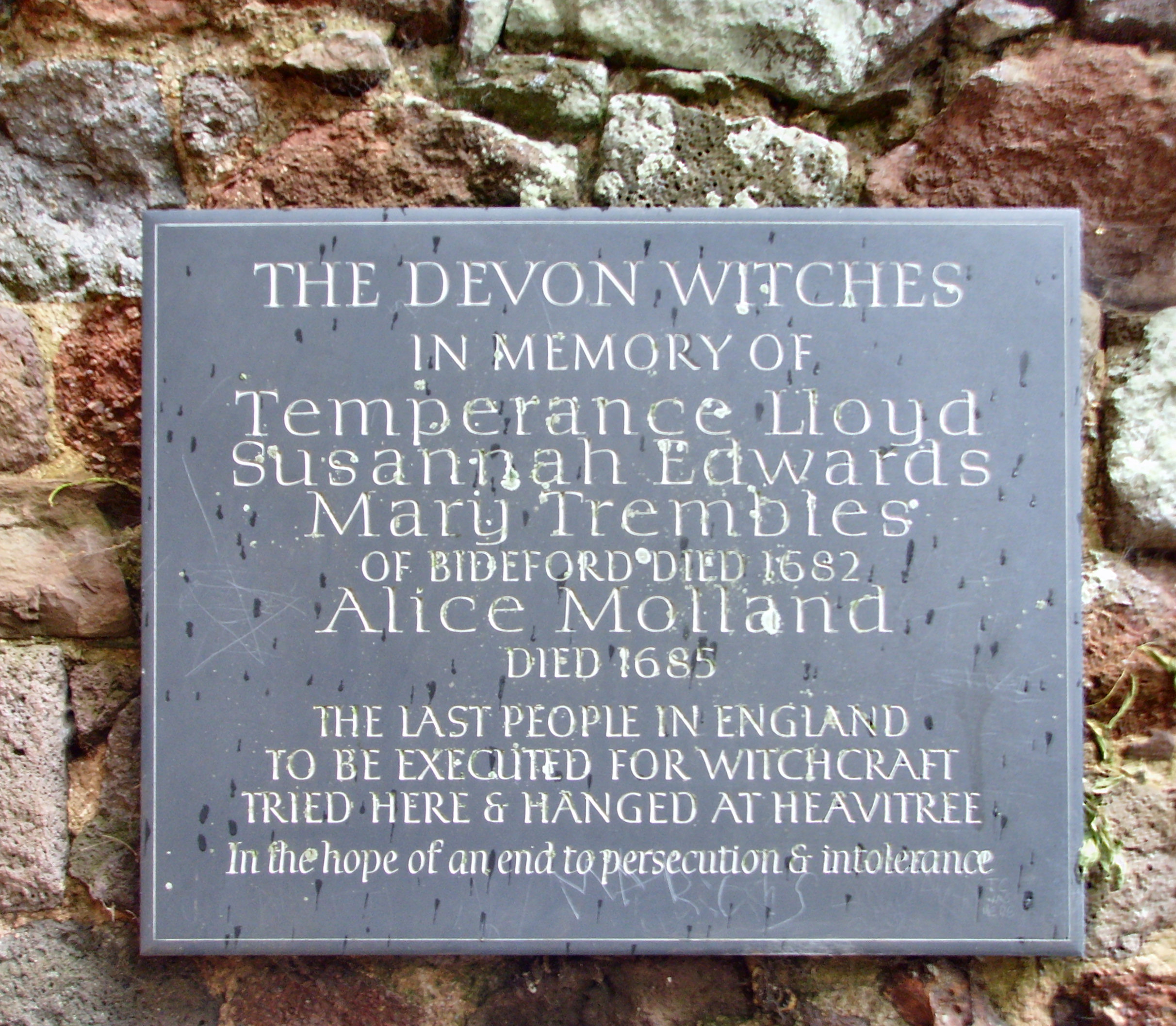
A plaque commemorating the executions of the Bideford witch trial on the wall of Rougemont Castle in Exeter

In England, witch trials were conducted from the 15th century until the 18th century. They are estimated to have resulted in the death of perhaps 500 people, 90 percent of whom were women. The witch hunt was at its most intense stage during the English Civil War (1642–1651) and the Puritan era of the mid-17th century.

== History ==
=== Chronology ===
Witch trials are known to have occurred in England during the Middle Ages. These cases were few, and mainly concerned cases toward people of the elite or with ties to the elite, often with a political purpose. Examples of these were the trials against Eleanor Cobham and Margery Jourdemayne in 1441, which resulted in lifetime imprisonment for the former, and an execution for heresy for the latter.

It was, however, not until the second half of the 16th century that a widescale witch hunt took place in England. The cases became more common in the end of the 16th century and the early 17th century, particularly since the succession of James VI and I to the throne. King James had shown a great interest in witch trials since the Copenhagen witch trials in 1589, which had inspired the North Berwick witch trials in Scotland in 1590. When he succeeded to the English throne in 1603, he sharpened the English Witchcraft Act the following year.

Witch trials were most frequent in England in the first half of the 17th century. They reached their most intense phase during the English Civil War of the 1640s and the Puritan era of the 1650s. This was a period of intense witch hunts, known for witch hunters such as Matthew Hopkins, who called himself the "Witchfinder General".

In the 16th and 17th centuries people across England, irrespective of status, believed in witches. Witchcraft was first made a capital offence in 1542 under a statute of Henry VIII but was repealed five years later. Witch fever reached new heights when witchcraft was again classed as a felony in 1562 under a statute of Elizabeth I. This led to thousands of people, mostly women, being falsely accused, forced to confess under torture and punished.

=== Legal situation ===
The Witchcraft Act 1541 was enacted in England; but was repealed in 1547. The Witchcraft Act 1563 introduced the death penalty for any sorcery used to cause someone's death. The Witchcraft Act 1603 reformed the law to include anyone to have made a pact with Satan.

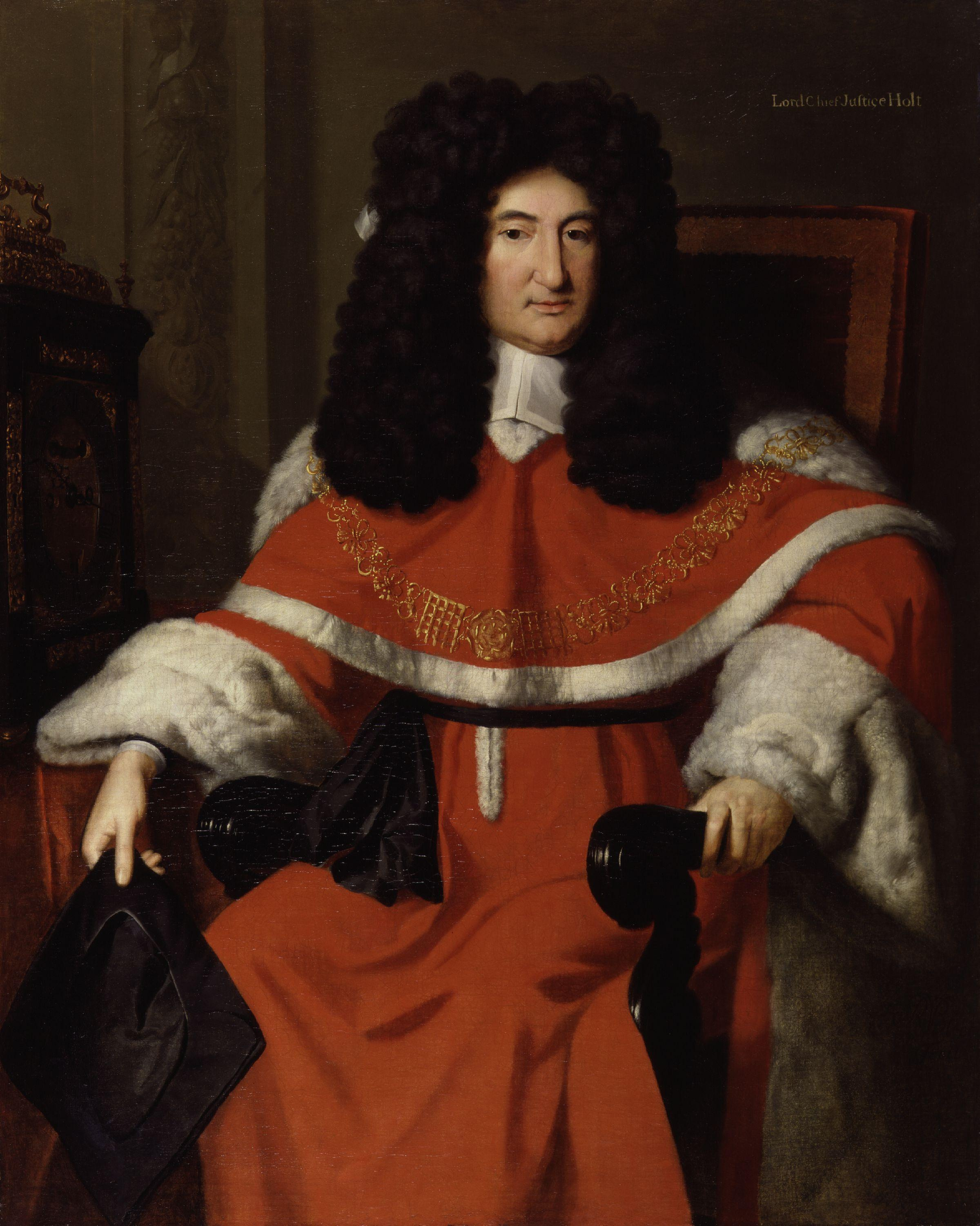
Jurist Sir John Holt by Richard van Bleeck, c. 1700. Holt greatly helped eliminate prosecutions for witchcraft in England after the Bideford witch trial. National Portrait Gallery, London.

=== The witch trials ===
In England, it was not as common as in some other nations to be accused of having attended a Witches' Sabbath or having made a Pact with Satan. The typical victim of an English witch trial was a poor old woman with a bad reputation, who was accused by her neighbours of having a familiar and of having injured or caused harm to other people's livestock by use of sorcery.

About 500 people are estimated to have been executed for witchcraft in England.

A small community, where people really know each other, is a place where small grudges and disagreements come to light. For St. Osyth, this was a small community who was ready to unleash those disagreements by sharing them with a judge, such as Justice Darcy, to gain something more from their peers. Many early English villages at this time depended on the barter system due to the poverty they were enlisted to, which is an explanation as to why begging was a part of many trials. People were so well versed in these skills, living them day to day, that they were ready to squabble in a court as they would have done in a market. Accusing someone as a witch was a quick and easy way to get back at someone who was resented by another.

Normally, people sentenced for witchcraft in England were executed by hanging. An exception was made when the person had committed another crime for which people were executed by burning at the stake. For example, when Mary Lakeland was burned at the stake in Ipswich on 9 September 1645 after having been judged for witchcraft, she was not burned for the crime of witchcraft, but because she had used witchcraft to murder her husband: this latter crime constituted petty treason, for which the punishment was burning. Similar logic justified the execution by burning of Margaret Read, of King's Lynn, in 1590; and of Mary Oliver, of Norwich, in 1659. Another example is Ursula Kemp who went through many accusations and ended up being hanged. She was known to reside in "the cage" during her trial. In medieval times, "the cage" which is a type of prison, was often a form of public humiliation and confinement used to punish criminals. The structure was typically a small, barred enclosure, sometimes suspended in public places like market squares or outside castles, where individuals were left exposed to the elements. It was not only a form of physical restraint but also served to publicly shame the prisoner, reinforcing the societal power dynamics of punishment and authority.

=== Political and religious influences ===
Historian John Callow argues in his 2022 book, The Last Witches of England, that witchcraft trials and convictions were influenced by political and religious tension between nonconformist Whigs, on the one hand, and the adherents of Anglican Toryism, on the other hand, after the English Civil War.

=== End of witchcraft prosecutions ===
The 1682 Bideford witch trial resulted in the last people confirmed to have been executed for witchcraft in England. Jane Wenham (died 1730) is widely considered to be the last person to be condemned to death for witchcraft in England, although her conviction was set aside.

The Witchcraft Act 1735 finally concluded prosecutions for alleged witchcraft in England after sceptical jurists, especially Sir John Holt (1642–1710), had already largely ended convictions of alleged witches under English law.

== Colonies ==
Witch trials occurred also in the English colonies, where English law was applied. This was particularly the case in the Thirteen Colonies in North America. Examples of these were the Connecticut Witch Trials from 1647 to 1663. The most famous of these trials were the Salem witch trials in 1692. Two women were acquitted of witchcraft charges in the Province of Pennsylvania in 1683 after a trial in Philadelphia before William Penn.

== See also ==
- Channel Islands Witch Trials
- Witch trials in Scotland
- Witch trials in the early modern period
