= Whatfield =

Human settlement in Suffolk, England

Coordinates: 52.079°N 0.954°E

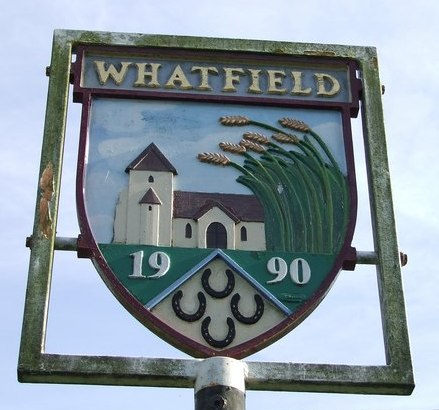
- Village sign

- Location within Suffolk
- Population: 335 (2011)
- OS grid reference: TM025464
- District: Babergh
- Shire county: Suffolk
- Region: East
- Country: England
- Sovereign state: United Kingdom
- Post town: Ipswich
- Postcode district: IP7
- Police: Suffolk
- Fire: Suffolk
- Ambulance: East of England

Whatfield is a village and civil parish in Suffolk, England. Located around 2 miles (3.2 km) north of Hadleigh, it is part of Babergh district.

== Origin of name ==
Skeat, in his 1913 The Place-Names of Suffolk, says this:

Spelt Whatefield, Ipm.; Quaterfield, H.R (with qu for wh); Gawatfelda, D.B. p.23. A.S. form Hwaete-feld; meaning "wheat field." Though A.S. has not this precise compound on record, we find hwaeteland, "wheat-land" and feld as a suffix. Whatfield was sometimes called Wheatfield (see The Beauties of England). "This Town is chiefly remarkable for growing the most excellent Seed-Wheat"; Kirby.

== Geography ==
The Calves Wood, a County Wildlife Site (CWS) in the north of the parish, is classed as ancient woodland, whilst the parish's south-western border is delineated by the River Brett. The parish council holds two meadows and a piece of rough woodland in trust for the villagers. The woodland is on the left-hand side of a pleasant walk down to the river.

The first meadow, known as Buckle's Meadow, or Buckledees Meadow by some older parishioners, was purchased in the 1960s with money raised in the village and a grant. Access to the site, which is a county wildlife site, is by public footpath from Rectory Road.

The second meadow, also accessible by public footpath, is Hunty's Vale and was the kind gift to the village by the sisters Edith and Francis Vale who were parishioners. A programme of conservation is on-going to maintain and improve the area for plants, animals and birds as well as being a pleasant place to walk.

The village was awarded the title Suffolk Village of the Year 2014 in a competition organised by the Suffolk Association of Local Councils, Radio Suffolk, East Anglian Daily Times and Network Power, to acknowledge the community spirit amongst the residents of this small village and how Whatfield CEVCP School integrates with the village.

== St Margaret's Church ==
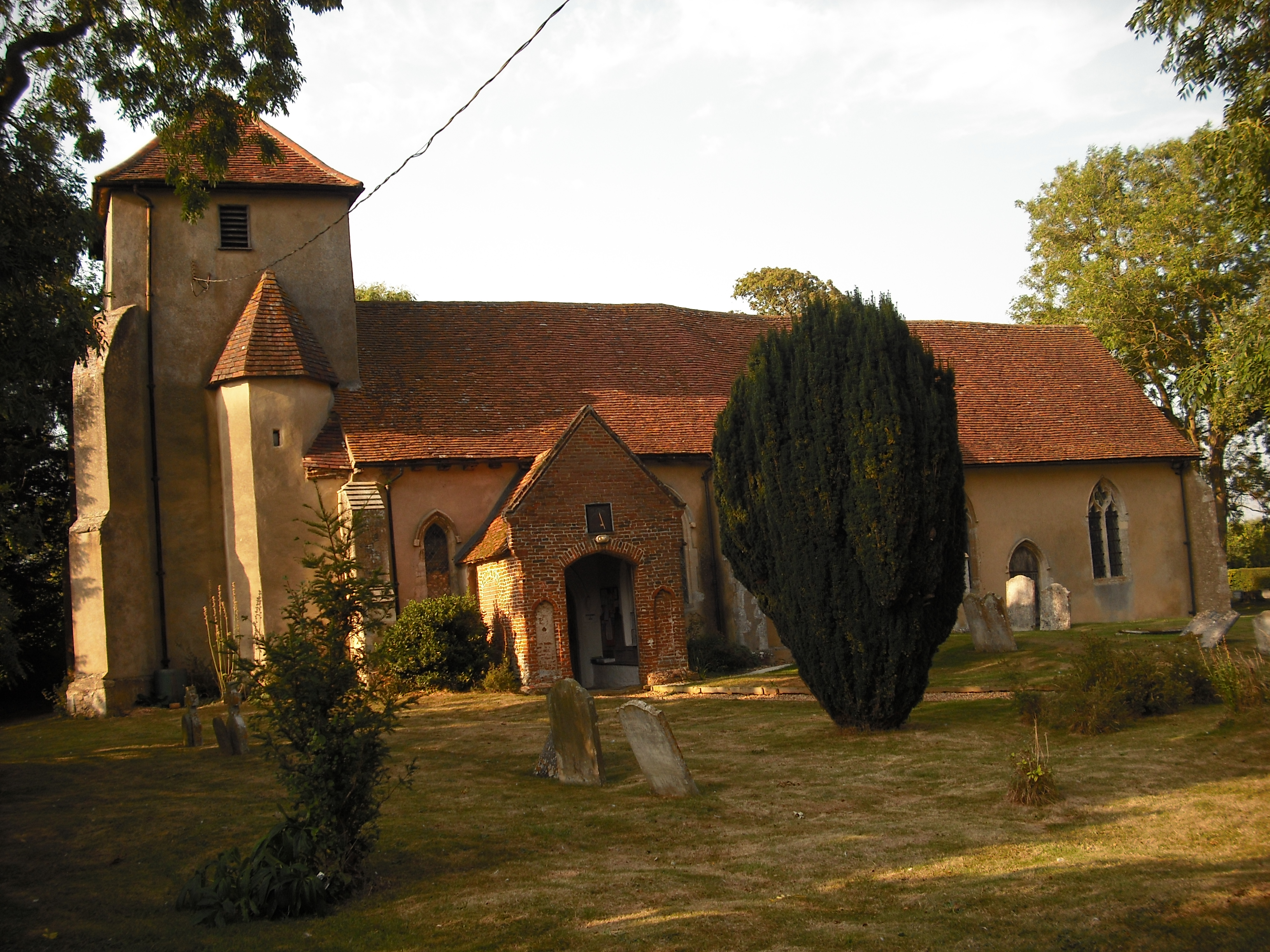
St Margaret's Church

The parish church of St Margaret is a small church dating from the 13th and 14th century that has been modified and improved several times over the centuries. The church has been a Grade I listed building since 23 January 1958.

The south wall has a commemorative plaque to George Arthur Falconer (1894–1981), who was H. M. Ambassador to Nepal and High Sheriff of Suffolk. There is also a large marble memorial plaque, inscribed in Latin, to William Vesey who died on 21 June 1699 aged 50 and his wife Elizabeth. At the rear of the church is a large coat of arms for Vesey. There is also a large marble plaque to George Clubbe, Rector of Whatfield, and father of John Clubbe.

The benches are mostly Victorian, but one at least dates from 1589 and is engraved with the name "John Wilson".

== Whatfield Hall ==
Whatfield Hall is a timber-framed and plastered two-story building, possibly of the 16th or 17th century. Since 10 July 2008 it has been a Grade II listed building.

== Other amenities ==
- Watfield Salvation Army Hall
- Whatfield United Reformed Church
