= Joan Peterson =

English woman executed for witchcraft

Joan Peterson (d. 12 April 1652 at Tyburn) also known as The Witch of Wapping, was an English woman executed for witchcraft.

She worked as a herbalist and cunning woman in Wapping, London. She was a successful herbalist, and enjoyed popularity in her business.

She was implicated in the ongoing case in the death of Lady Mary Powell, who had died under suspicious circumstances, leaving her estate to Anne Levingston. Joan Peterson was accused of having bewitched the 80-year-old Powell to death. She was also accused of having caused a serious of fits to the baker Christopher Wilson, who owed her money. She was offered a pardon if she agreed to testify against Anne Levingston and Levingston's so-called ‘witchcraft’ activities. She refused to testify against Levingston however. She was sentenced to death as guilty of witchcraft and executed by hanging at Tyburn on 12 April 1652.

She belonged to the last executed for witchcraft in the city of London. She was however not the last person to be put on trial for witchcraft in London, were Jane Kent in 1682 and Jane Dodson in 1683 appears to have been the last, though they were both acquitted for the crime.

Her case was publicized in the pamphlet The Witch of Wapping: the life and devilish practices of Joan Peterson, 1652.
