= All Saints' Church, Brandeston =

Coordinates: 52.195108°N 1.287644°E

Church of All Saints, Brandeston
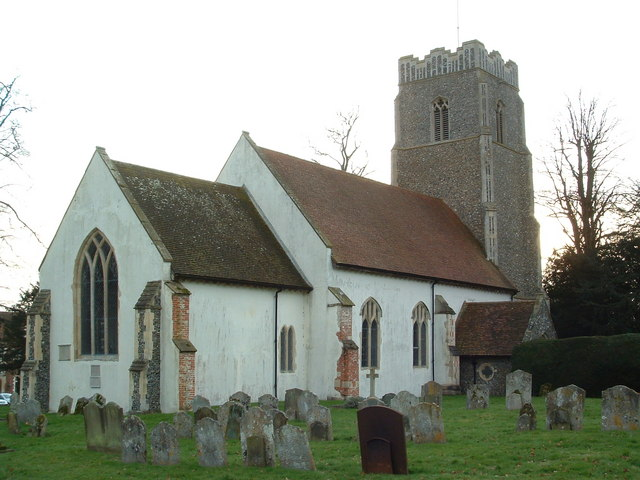
- Church of All Saints, Brandeston
- Location: Brandeston, Suffolk, IP13 7AQ
- Country: England
- Denomination: Church of England

History
- Status: Active

Architecture
- Functional status: Parish church
- Heritage designation: Grade I listed

Administration
- Diocese: Diocese of St Edmundsbury and Ipswich
- Archdeaconry: Archdeaconry of Suffolk
- Deanery: Loes Deanery
- Parish: Brandeston

The Church of All Saints is a Church of England parish church in Brandeston, Suffolk, England. The church dates from the Middle Age and is a Grade I listed building.

== History ==
The original church dates from the medieval period. The chancel dates from the early 14th century, and the tower dates from the late 14th century.

On 7 December 1966, the church was designated a grade I listed building.

=== Interior ===
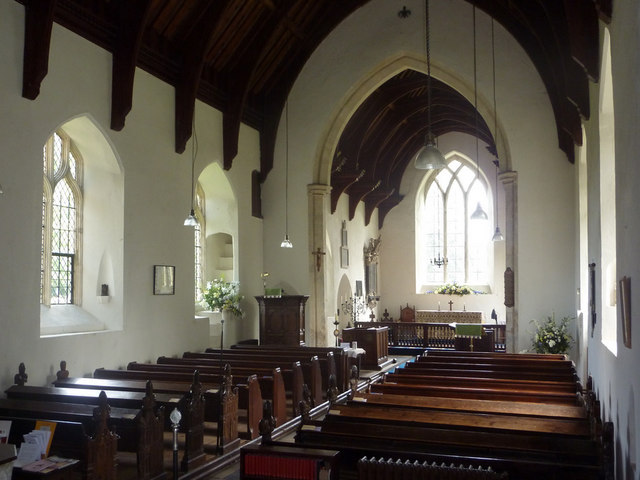
The nave and chancel of All Saints

In 2008, Simon Knott stated "The interior is very pleasant, with one of those Purbeck marble fonts familiar from this part of Suffolk. The Revetts are all around, in memorials and bequests. There is a fine scattering of medieval glass, including an excellent roundel of St Catherine, and two other panes which must have come from the edges of a larger work, which feature a monk and a donor".

=== Controversy ===
There was much conflict in the 16th and 17th centuries between Puritan beliefs and Catholicism. John Lowes became vicar of All Saints in 1596 and held his position for over 40 years. He was the main force that tried to make Catholicism fit into the wider vision of the Anglican prayer book. Ministers like Lowes were increasingly isolated, they were prosecuted as 'scandalous ministers', and their ritualistic behaviour was noted and used as evidence against them. The Rev. John Lowes was found guilty of witchcraft by Matthew Hopkins, the self-styled Witchfinder General, and as result in the autumn of 1645 he was hanged at Bury St Edmunds, along with 39 innocent men, women and children. These events are recounted in the 1968 film Witchfinder General, starring Vincent Price.
