= Jane Wenham (alleged witch) =

English alleged witch (d. 1730)

Jane Wenham (died 1730) was one of the last people to be condemned to death for witchcraft in England, although her conviction was set aside. Her trial in 1712 is widely considered to be the last witch trial in England.

== Background ==
The twice-married Jane Wenham, of Walkern, Hertfordshire, had apparently separated from her second husband and about 1710 brought a charge of defamation against a farmer, John Chapman, in response to an accusation of witchcraft. The local justice of the peace, Sir Henry Chauncy, referred the matter to the Rev Godfrey Gardiner, the rector of Walkern. She was awarded with a shilling, though advised to be less quarrelsome. She was disappointed with this outcome, and it was reported that she had said she would have justice "some other way". She supposedly then bewitched Ann Thorne, a servant at the rectory.

== Trial ==
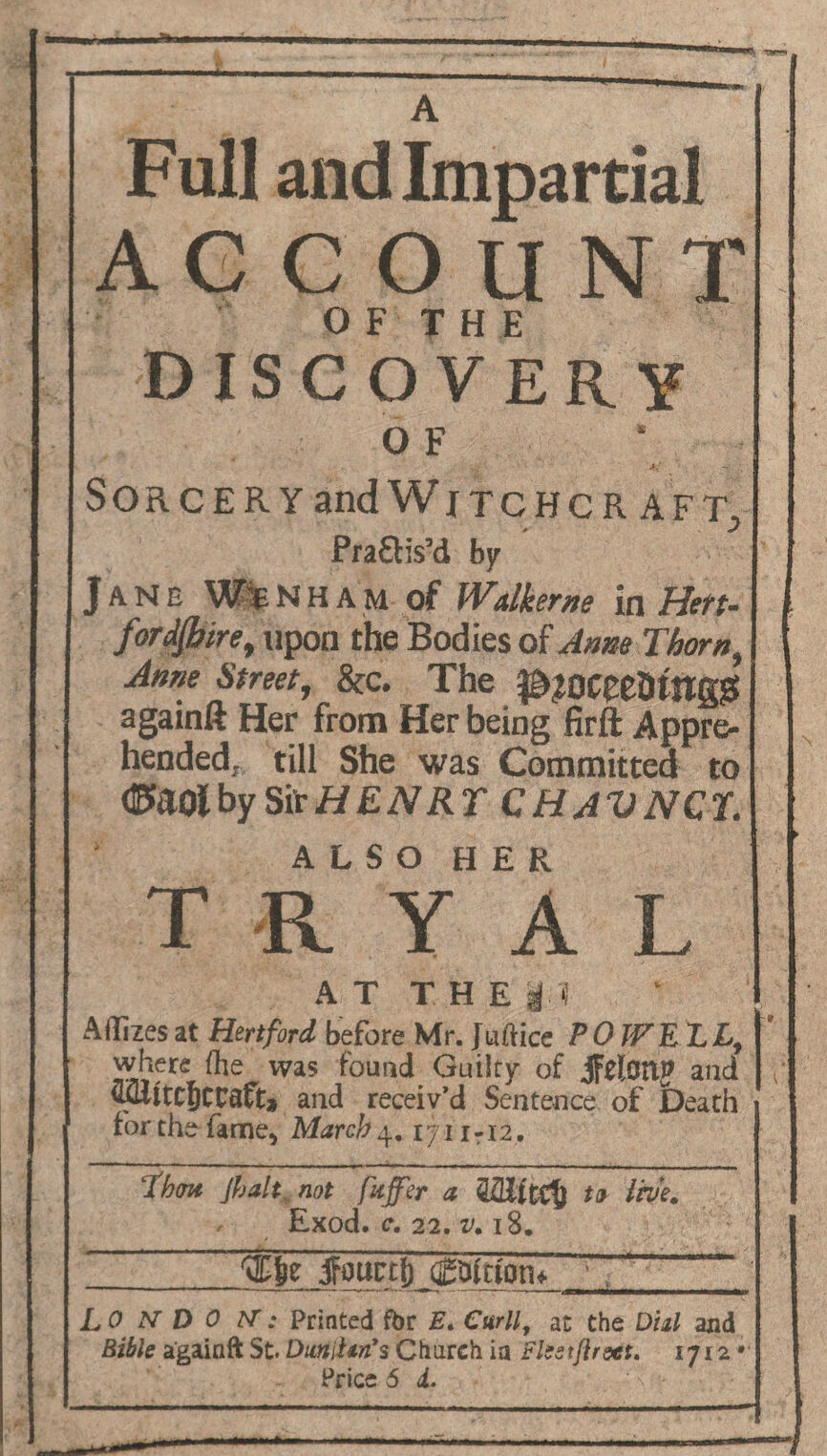
Title page of A Full and Impartial Account of the Discovery of Sorcery and Witchcraft by Francis Bragge, published in 1712

A warrant for Wenham's arrest was issued by Sir Henry Chauncy, who gave instructions that she be searched for "witch marks". She requested that she undergo trials to avoid being detained, such as a swimming test, however, she was asked to repeat the Lord's Prayer.

The accused was brought before Sir John Powell at the assize court at Hertford on 4 March 1712. A number of villagers gave evidence that Wenham practised witchcraft. The judge was clearly more sceptical than the jury of the evidence presented. When an accusation of flying was made, the judge remarked that flying, per se, was not a crime. Through the good offices of Sir John Powell, Queen Anne granted Jane Wenham a pardon. A detailed account of the trial and of the claims then made by parishioners is provided by the Hertfordshire antiquary William Blyth Gerish (died 1921) in his 'Hertfordshire Folk Lore, No. 4', A Hertfordshire Witch; or the Story of Jane Wenham, the 'Wise Woman' of Walkern (1906). He concludes on page thirteen that the key to her persecution by Bragge lay in her claim to have attended Dissenting Meetings.

== Final years ==
Wenham was removed from her village for her own safety and given a home on the estate of Mr Plumer at Gilston. Here she was visited by Bishop Francis Hutchinson (1660–1739), author of an Historical essay concerning witchcraft (1718), in which he applied an extremely rational approach to the subject. Hutchinson, who had met other survivors of witch-hunts, regarded their persecution as Tory superstition. After Plumer's death she moved to a cottage on the Cowper estate at Hertingfordbury where she died on Thursday, 11 January 1730, and was buried in Hertingfordbury churchyard on the Sunday following, her funeral sermon being preached by the curate, Rev Mr Squire.

== Contemporary accounts ==
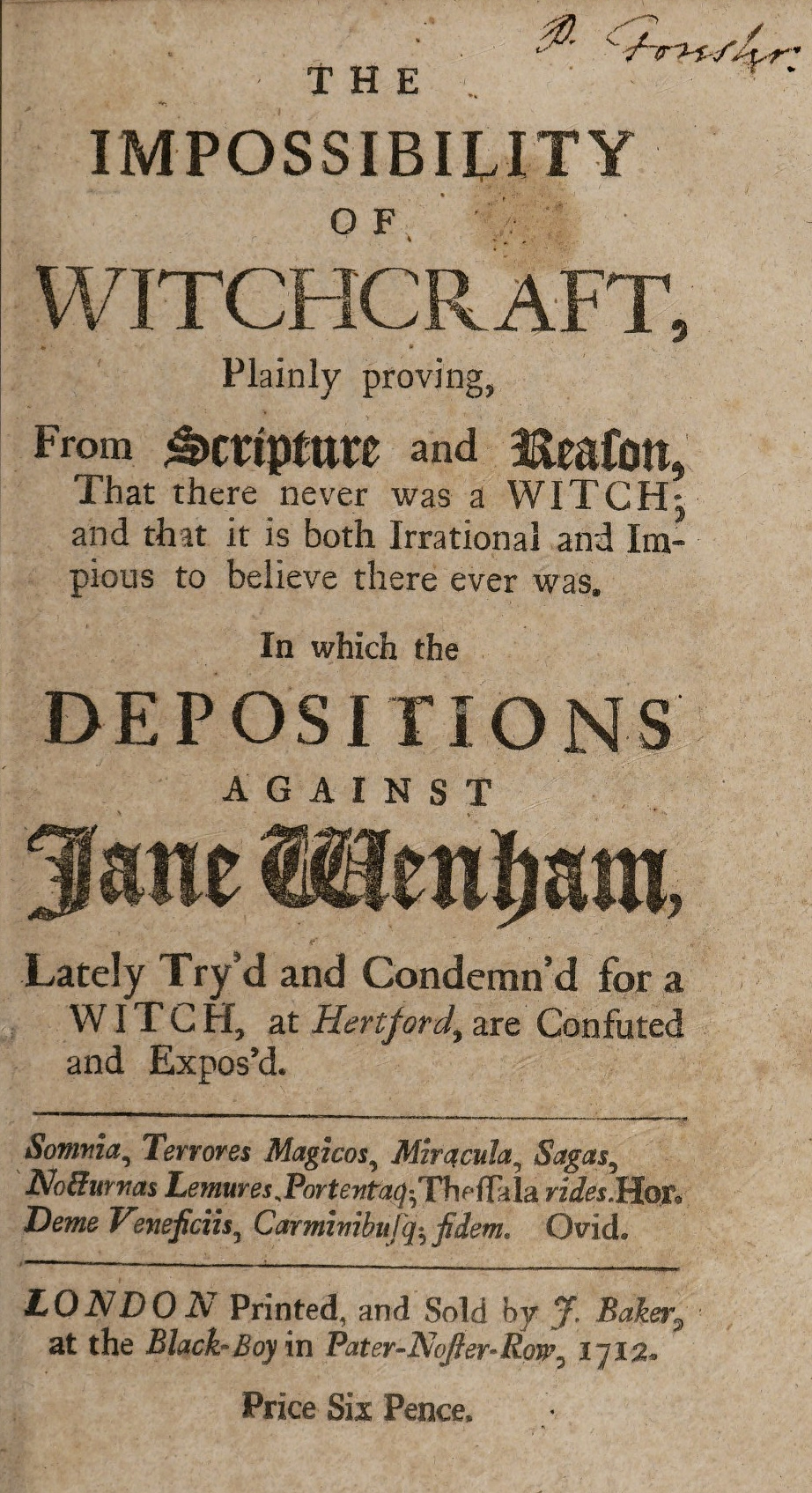
Title page of The Impossibility of Witchcraft, an anonymous pamphlet also published in 1712, which argued against the charges made by Bragge and others

The trial caused a sensation in London, where at least eight pamphlets were quickly published, some denouncing Wenham and others proclaiming her innocence. Three of them were written by the younger Francis Bragge, who had received his B.A. from Peterhouse, Cambridge, a few months earlier, and was ordained as a deacon in London later in the year. He was a witness at the trial, and his first publication, A Full and Impartial Account of the Discovery of Sorcery and Witchcraft, Practis'd by Jane Wenham of Walkern in Hertfordshire contains the most detailed contemporary description of the case.

== Historical debate ==
Some historians, such as Sir Keith Thomas, have suggested, taking this case is an example, that at this stage in English history there was generally a difference in attitudes towards supposed witchcraft between educated and less educated people, the latter being more credulous. However, the Wenham case is arguably more complicated than this distinction might imply, as Henry Chauncy, for example, was a published author who had studied at Cambridge University. Chauncy's motivation has been the subject of speculation. Ian Bostridge, one of Keith Thomas's students, has argued that political issues were involved in the case.

In 1700 about a fifth of the population of Hertfordshire were nonconformists and a return made in 1715, shows that Walkern, a small rural parish then had eighty-four dissenting families. The house of Edward Ives in Walkern had been certified for meetings of protestant dissenters for religious worship in 1699. According to Francis Bragge, Wenham said that she was "prosecuted out of Spite, only because she went to the Dissenting Meetings".

== Plays ==
=== The Last Witch ===
In 2012, a play entitled The Last Witch was performed at Hertford Theatre and Walkern Hall, 300 years after the original trial. Written by Kate Miller and directed by former Hertfordshire vicar Richard Syms, the play starred Toni Brooks as the titular character, with Rhiannon Drake as Anne Thorne and Lindsay Cooper as Debora Gardiner.

=== Jane Wenham: The Witch of Walkern ===
In 2015 a play about Wenham by Rebecca Lenkiewicz opened at Watford Palace Theatre and went on tour.
