= Harvest Home =

Harvest Home may refer to:

- Harvest Home (Hilda Vaughan novel), a 1936 novel by Hilda Vaughan
- Harvest Home (novel), a 1973 horror novel by Tom Tryon
  - An abbreviated name for the 1978 television mini-series adapted from the novel, more properly The Dark Secret of Harvest Home
- Harvest Home (1995 film), a 1995 film
- Harvest Home (2009 film), a 2009 film by Craig Whitney
- "Harvest Home" (song), a 1982 song by Big Country
- Mabon (Wicca) or Harvest Home, a holiday in the Wiccan Wheel of the Year
- Harvest Home, a shipwreck off the coast of Newfoundland
- Crop Over, a harvest festival originating in Barbados

== See also ==
- "Come Ye Thankful People, Come", a hymn
