= Portia Nelson =

American singer, songwriter, actress and author (1920–2001)

- Born: Betty Mae Nelson; May 27, 1920; Brigham City, Utah, U.S.
- Died: March 6, 2001 (aged 80); New York City, U.S.
- Occupations: Singer-songwriter; actress; author
- Years active: 1945–2001

Portia Nelson (born Betty Mae Nelson; May 27, 1920 – March 6, 2001) was an American popular singer, songwriter, actress and author. She was best known for her appearances in 1950s cabarets, where she sang soprano.

In 1965, she portrayed the cantankerous Sister Berthe in the film version of The Sound of Music; she also had a minor role as Sarah in the musical Doctor Dolittle; on TV's All My Children Nelson played the long-running role of nanny Mrs. Gurney. Her book of poetic musings, There's a Hole in My Sidewalk: The Romance of Self-Discovery, became a mainstay of twelve-step programs.

== Early life and education ==
Nelson was born in Brigham City, Utah on May 27, 1920.

== Early career ==
In Los Angeles in early 1946, Nelson worked briefly as secretary to film director André de Toth; she held another secretarial job in the publicity department of United Artists Pictures. Around that time she adopted the name Portia, a nickname that friends gave her based on her love of the popular radio soap opera Portia Faces Life. She was known for occasionally sitting at pianos on the lot and demonstrating songs, and word of her vocal talents spread. Jane Russell was then on the lot making a film, Young Widow; one day they talked about songs they both liked, and Nelson performed one at the piano. "What the hell are you doing pounding a typewriter? ... You should be singing," said Russell. Nelson would later work for Russell as a vocal coach. After Nelson's death, Russell said that she "had a high, clear voice, with such intonation and shading! Her lyrics were sung with such understanding that you felt you'd heard a poem sung."

== Early cabaret work ==
After leaving Nick Arden's, Nelson continued to work day jobs, while singing sporadically. In 1949 she performed at the Café Gala, a cabaret on Hollywood's Sunset Strip; singer-pianist Bobby Short entertained. Recalled Short in his 1995 autobiography Bobby Short: The Life and Times of a Saloon Singer: "Portia walked onto the floor of the Gala, tall, poised, goddesslike in floating chiffon – and singing in a way that was all her own. She was a smash."

It was at the Café Gala that Nelson was heard by Herbert Jacoby, the owner (with Max Gordon) of Manhattan's preeminent cabaret, the Blue Angel. Jacoby invited her to sing there. In January 1950, Nelson moved to New York; soon after she was performing on one of the Blue Angel's four-act bills. She would sing there on and off until 1959, sharing rosters with Carol Channing, Pearl Bailey, Imogene Coca, Orson Bean, Wally Cox, Harry Belafonte, Johnny Mathis, and other budding stars. Nelson sometimes performed in the front lounge, where her accompanist was William Roy, a young pianist and composer who was just beginning a fifty-year career as a musical director for many of cabaret's greatest performers.

In 1951 Nelson would also appear at the New York lounge Celeste, accompanied by songwriter and pianist Bart Howard, who soon became the emcee at the Blue Angel. At Celeste, Nelson performed many of the songs (including "In Other Words," later retitled "Fly Me to the Moon") that she would gather on her album Let Me Love You: Portia Nelson Sings the Songs of Bart Howard. She championed Howard for the rest of her career. The singer had made an auspicious recorded debut with the album Love Songs for a Late Evening, released in 1953 by Columbia's Masterworks division, normally reserved for classical artists. The New Yorker reviewer Rogers Whitaker wrote in his liner notes: "One has only to hear the delicate phrasing and effortless command of melody to understand why she could immediately create such a stir."

== Theater and other recordings ==
Nelson was also a frequent participant in a series of recorded re-creations of classic musicals, produced by Columbia president and producer Goddard Lieberson. The singer was heard on Roberta, The Boys from Syracuse, On Your Toes, and Oklahoma! A recording of Noël Coward's Bitter Sweet, which featured Nelson and singer Robert Rounseville, remains unissued; according to Nelson, its release was nixed by Coward, who disapproved of it.

In 1954, Nelson originated the role of Miss Minerva Oliver in The Golden Apple, John Latouche's musical adaptation of Homer's Iliad and Odyssey. The Golden Apple opened off-Broadway at the Phoenix Theatre, then moved to Broadway's Alvin Theatre, where it ran from April through August. In 1955, she contributed material to the Broadway review Almost Crazy, which lasted just 16 performances. She continued to sing at the Blue Angel and other cabarets, including New York's Bon Soir and Downstairs at the Upstairs, the Colony in London, and Bricktop's in Rome. In 1959, she began hosting her own musical radio show, Sunday in New York, produced by Allen Ludden.

== Los Angeles ==
Her cabaret career, like the scene itself, was starting to wane, and in 1960 Nelson moved to Los Angeles. There she maintained a dual career as a writer of special musical material (for Carol Burnett, Debbie Reynolds, Marlene Dietrich, Julie Andrews, and others) and as vocal coach to such actors as Rod Steiger. She also became an actress who specialized, inadvertently, in roles of nuns. In The Sound of Music (1965), Nelson played Sister Berthe, who saved the von Trapp family in pre-World War II Austria by sabotaging a Nazi car. Nelson uttered the memorable line, "Reverend Mother, I have sinned." The next year she appeared as Sister Elizabeth in the film comedy The Trouble with Angels. In 1967 Nelson appeared as Sister Benedict on the TV western The Big Valley in the episode titled "Days of Grace."

She appeared in the movie Doctor Dolittle and worked as consulting producer and writer for the 1969 TV special, Debbie Reynolds and the Sound of Children. During her L.A. years, Nelson studied painting with celebrity portraitist and art teacher Richard McKenzie, who was Fred Astaire's son-in-law and who owned an art gallery in Beverly Hills. In honor of Nelson's repeated castings as a nun, the gallery hosted an exhibition of nun paintings by Nelson and other artists.

When her friend Rock Hudson was preparing to record his first and only album, Rock, Gently: Rock Hudson Sings the Songs of Rod McKuen (on the Stanyan label) in 1970, Nelson coached the actor vocally. Another friend, the actor, screenwriter, and novelist Tom Tryon, cast her as the busybody Mrs. Rowe in the 1972 film version of his thriller novel, The Other.

== New York ==
In the 1960s Nelson had sung little; her only album of that decade, Picadilly Pickle: Lady Nelson and the Lords, was a rock-and-roll spoof on which Nelson played Vox organ and didn't sing. Around 1971, she returned to New York and made a rare cabaret appearance at the short-lived club Mary Mary, owned by singer-actress Mary McCarty. In 1976, with a cabaret renaissance underway in New York and other cities, Nelson made her official singing comeback with an engagement at the Manhattan club Brothers & Sisters; thereafter she sang at other New York clubs (The Ballroom, Ted Hook's OnStage, Freddy's Supper Club) and at the Mocambo in San Francisco. Reviewing her appearance at The Ballroom, Rex Reed wrote: "With silver hair rising to a peak atop sleek chiffon and mile-long pearls, Miss Nelson is as graceful and refined to observe as she is to listen to."

== Acting work, 1970s–1980s ==
From May through November 1976, Nelson played the small role of Therese, a spinster, in the touring company of The Baker's Wife, a musical by Stephen Schwartz and Joseph Stein. The show was Broadway-bound, but closed in Washington, D.C. before its New York opening. Nelson continued to act, taking on roles in the soap operas The Doctors and All My Children (in which she played the recurring role of nanny Rachel Gurney) and appearing on numerous TV commercials. She was also seen on an episode of the sitcom Chico and the Man and in the movie Can't Stop the Music (1980), which starred the Village People.

== Writing ==
Nelson was a cancer survivor, having conquered breast cancer after a mastectomy in 1973. Four years later, Popular Library published Nelson's milestone book, There's a Hole in My Sidewalk: The Romance of Self-Discovery. (Beyond Words Publishing reissued it in 1993.) Its cover appears on a poster displayed in the office of Sean McGuire, the fictional psychologist portrayed by Robin Williams in the film Good Will Hunting (1997). Nelson turned the book into an off-Broadway musical, presented at the York Theatre in Manhattan. One of her poems, "Autobiography in Five Short Chapters", went on to become a highly popular self-help and recovery text.

The poem (which was often uncredited to Nelson) was adopted by motivational speakers and reprinted in The Tibetan Book of Living and Dying by Sogyal Rinpoche, as well as in the foreword of TV actress Roseanne Barr's autobiography, My Lives. Jazz singer Dianne Reeves set the poem to music and recorded it as "The First Five Chapters" on her live CD In the Moment (2000).

== Later life and death ==
In the early 1990s, a bout with throat and tongue cancer – which Nelson, who never smoked, blamed on her years of singing in smoky nightclubs – robbed her of her soprano voice.

In October 1992, the Mabel Mercer Foundation honored her with its Premier Cabaret Classic Award. On January 20, 1993, at the inauguration of President Bill Clinton, the mezzo-soprano Marilyn Horne, a close friend of hers, sang the song that would become Nelson's trademark, "Make a Rainbow". Nelson had written it in the 1960s and dedicated it to Horne's biracial daughter Angela.

In early 2001, she was honored at a MAC/ASCAP Songwriters' Showcase in New York; around that time she made her last appearance at a performance of a revue of her songs, This Life, at the New York cabaret Don't Tell Mama. By now her cancer had recurred, and the singer died in her apartment on March 6, 2001. At her request, Nelson's ashes were spread by friends and family at the Kolob Canyons in Utah's Zion National Park, one of her favorite childhood recreational spots. Also per her wishes, the singer's writings, photographs, recordings, press clippings, and personal memorabilia were donated to the New York Public Library to establish the Portia Nelson Archive at the Library for the Performing Arts in New York City.

== Discography ==
=== Solo albums ===
- Love Songs for a Late Evening (Columbia Masterworks ML 4722; CD reissue: DRG 91451) Recorded 1952
- Autumn Leaves (Dolphin 4; CD reissue: DRG 91442) Recorded 1955
- Let Me Love You: Portia Nelson Sings the Love Songs of Bart Howard (New Sound NS 3002; CD reissue: DRG 91442) Recorded 1956
- Sunday in New York (Lockett-Palmer CD LPR 941402) Recorded 1959
- Picadilly Pickle: Lady Nelson and the Lords (Dunhill/ABC DS-50028) Recorded 1967

=== Guest appearances ===
- Oklahoma! (Columbia Masterworks ML 4598; CD reissue: Sony 92867) Recorded 1952
- On Your Toes (Columbia Masterworks ML 4645; CD reissue: Stage Door Records 9002) Recorded 1952
- Roberta (Columbia Masterworks ML 4765; CD reissue: DRG 19073) Recorded 1952
- The Boys from Syracuse (Columbia ML 4837; CD reissue: Sony Broadway SK 53329) Recorded 1953
- The Golden Apple (RCA Victor LOC-1014; CD reissue: RCA Victor Broadway 09026-68934-2) Recorded 1954
- The Sound of Music (RCA Victor LSOD-2005; CD reissue: Sony Legacy 88697 79086 2) Recorded 1965
- The Baker's Wife Mini-Album (Take Home Tunes THT 773) Recorded 1977
- This Life: Portia Nelson – Her Songs and Her Friends (DRG 91445) Recorded 1996

== Filmography ==
- The Sound of Music (1965) - Sister Berthe
- The Trouble with Angels (1965) - Sister Elizabeth
- The Mystery of the Chinese Junk (1967) - Aunt Gertrude Hardy
- Doctor Dolittle (1967) - Sarah Dolittle
- The Other (1972) - Mrs. Rowe
- Can't Stop the Music (1980) - Law Office Receptionist
- Rage of Angels (1983, TV Movie) - Receptionist

== Television (partial list) ==
- The Steve Allen Show (1952)
- Tonight (1953)
- The Big Valley (1967) - Sister Benedict
- Chico and the Man: "Reverend Bemis's Alter Ego" (1976) - Mrs. Elderberry
- ABC Weekend Specials: The Ghost of Thomas Kempe (1979)
- The Doctors (1981)
- All My Children (1983–1991) - Rachel Gurney (final appearance)
