= The Devil's Woods =

- Directed by: Anthony White
- Written by: Anthony White; Stephen Cromwell
- Produced by: Stephen Cromwell; Mags Dziadura; Anthony White
- Starring: Stephen Cromwell; Danielle Keaney; Daniel Mahoney; Caoimhe Cassidy; Eoin Quinn; Aoife King
- Cinematography: Anthony White
- Edited by: Anthony White
- Music by: Paul Scott
- Production company: Whitewashed Films
- Release dates: 24 October 2015 (Irish Film Institute Horrorthon); 10 May 2016 (DVD and VOD)
- Running time: 73 minutes
- Country: Ireland
- Language: English

The Devil's Woods is a 2015 Irish folk horror film directed by Anthony White, starring Stephen Cromwell, Danielle Keaney, Daniel Mahoney, Caoimhe Cassidy, Eoin Quinn and Aoife King.

== Cast ==
- Stephen Cromwell as Keith
- Danielle Keaney as Jennifer
- Daniel Mahoney as Jay
- Caoimhe Cassidy as Katie
- Eoin Quinn as The Stalker
- Aoife King as Laura
- Richard Mason as PJ
- Aidan O'Sullivan as Mr. Dargle
- Roxanne Josephine as Danielle
- Gary Jones as Cox
- Hayden Mason as Larkin

== Release ==
The film was released on DVD and VOD on 10 May 2016.

== Reception ==
Gareth Jones of Dread Central rated the film 2 stars out of 5 and wrote that while White "knows his pacing and refuses to stretch things out unnecessarily", and the film "doesn’t hang around long enough to feel like too irritating a time sink", it "just doesn’t have enough meat on the bones for it to deliver the goods."

Scott Clark of Starburst wrote that the film is "too scarce for its short runtime."
