= A Guide to Becoming an Elm Tree =

- Directed by: Adam Mann; Skye Mann
- Written by: Adam Mann; Skye Mann
- Produced by: Adam Mann; Skye Mann
- Starring: James Healy-Meaney; Gerry Wade; M.J. Sullivan
- Cinematography: Conor Tobin
- Music by: Carlos Solares
- Release date: 11 June 2023 (Achill International Film Festival)
- Running time: 75 minutes
- Country: Ireland
- Language: English

A Guide to Becoming an Elm Tree is a 2023 Irish folk horror film written and directed by Adam and Skye Mann, starring James Healy-Meaney, Gerry Wade and M.J. Sullivan. It was the Mann's debut feature.

== Cast ==
- James Healy-Meaney
- Gerry Wade
- M.J. Sullivan

== Production ==
Adam and Skye Mann, who live in Vancouver, went to Ireland in December 2021 to shoot the film, which they wrote, directed, produced and edited. They funded the film's production.

== Release ==
The film had its North American premiere at Fantastic Fest in Austin, Texas on 25 September 2023.

== Reception ==
JP Nunez of Horror Obsessive called the film a "beautiful, flawlessly executed ghost story about the pain of grief and the finality of death." Nadine Whitney of Alliance of Women Film Journalists described the film as a "disquieting and eerie work with an impeccable pictorial language." She praised the script and direction, calling it "as beguiling as the ancient mythology they invoke. “Nothing comes for free,” is a tale oft repeated in folklore" Stephanie Archer of Film Inquiry called the film a "must see" and wrote: "Feeling ancient in it origin, yet modern in its catharsis, A Guide to Becoming an Elm Tree is one of the biggest surprises out of Fantastic Fest." Andy Crump of Paste gave the film a score of 8.6/10 and wrote: "The film isn't a scare-a-minute affair. It’s thick with foreboding and heartache, and that’s the most Irish that Irish cinema gets."
