= Harm's Way (novel) =

1962 war novel by James Bassett

- First edition
- Author: James Bassett
- Cover artist: Carl Smith
- Language: English
- Genre: War novel
- Publisher: World Publishing Company
- Publication date: 1962
- Publication place: United States
- Pages: 510

Harm's Way is a 1962 war novel by James Bassett. Set in the Pacific theater during World War II, it follows the exploits of Captain Rockwell "Rock" Torrey as he plans and carries out naval operations against the Japanese. The book was adapted into the 1965 film In Harm's Way, which was produced and directed by Otto Preminger and starred John Wayne and Kirk Douglas.

== Plot summary ==
A regular United States Navy officer in the Pacific theater is assigned to command an operation to seize a group of strategic islands from the Japanese.

The novel opens with the attack on Pearl Harbor which catches the US Navy unaware. Captain Rockwell Torrey is in command of a heavy cruiser known only as Old Swayback (an obvious reference to the USS Salt Lake City (CA-25)), which is off the Hawaiian coast near Pearl Harbor, running another set of exercises in a long string of them.

Lieutenant (junior grade) William "Mac" McConnell is assigned as Officer of the Day aboard a destroyer, USS Cassiday, tied up in Pearl Harbor, not far from Battleship Row. When the attack comes, Lieutenant McConnell takes his ship out of the harbor, leaving his captain and executive officer behind, and eventually joins a scratch task group assembled around Torrey's cruiser. Torrey leads his task group on a seek-out-and-destroy mission. When the ships approach the end of their fuel, Torrey orders them to steer a straight course. That makes the group vulnerable to attack. A Japanese submarine scores two torpedo hits on Old Swayback before Cassiday can sink the sub with depth charges.

Back at Pearl Harbor, Torrey is relieved of his command and faces a Board of Inquiry that could lead to a court-martial, but when Admiral Chester Nimitz arrives to take command in the Pacific theater, he makes sure that Torrey will have a position on his planning staff. Torrey's officers scatter to various points in the Pacific theater, with his old exec, Paul Eddington, assigned to an unrewarding post at an old Free French base on the island of Toulebonne. Torrey drifts into a romance with a Navy nurse named Maggie Haynes; this romance is interrupted only briefly by the alert ordered during the Battle of Midway. Eventually, Torrey and his roommate, Captain Egan Powell, USNR, are invited to dinner at Nimitz's house, where Nimitz personally presents Torrey with the pair of Rear Admiral (lower half) stars that Nimitz had worn before taking command as Commander in Chief, Pacific Fleet (CINCPAC) and announces that he is to go into the Pacific theater to take personal command of an operation, called Mesquite, that has ground to a halt because of the inept micro-management by the area commander.

Torrey lands on the island of Gavabutu, about 300 miles (480 km) west of Toulebonne (where the area commander is headquartered), and immediately makes the area commander his enemy by planning an operation to drive the Japanese off Gavabutu immediately. This operation succeeds, and Torrey turns his attention to his next target: Levu-Vana, a much sought-after island having a central plain large enough to build runways for B-17 bombers. He learns that the Japanese want to stay on Levu-Vana.

Torrey's repeated attempts to get more materiel for his mission end in failure, largely because the Navy is sending most of its heavy tonnage to the Solomon Islands to support General Douglas MacArthur. Torrey presses on anyway; during the battle, enemy fire sinks his ship, and falling wreckage strikes him and knocks him unconscious. He wakes up aboard a hospital ship under the care of his lover, Maggie Haynes, initially believing that he has lost the battle and sacrificed his ships to no good purpose, until the general commanding his landing forces informs him that he is in control of Levu-Vana, that Torrey's battle was a success, and that no less than Admiral Ernest King has praised him highly for his efforts. Torrey submits to the ministrations of Maggie Haynes—who, in the last scene, prepares to shave his face using his prized seven-blade set of German straight razors, which his rescuers preserved and returned to him.

== Characters ==
The list of characters in Harm's Way is very lengthy. The most salient characters are:

- Captain Rockwell "Rock" Torrey, USN, CO of the cruiser known only as Old Swayback—afterwards Rear Admiral Rockwell Torrey, Commander, Advanced Tactical Zone, South Pacific (COMADTACZONSOPAC)
- Commander Paul Eddington, USN, executive officer of Old Swayback—afterwards Captain Paul Eddington, Chief of Staff, COMADTACZONSOPAC
- Captain Egan Powell, USNR, Flag Secretary, COMADTACZONSOPAC
- Lieutenant, junior grade William "Mac" McConnell, USN, assigned to destroyer USS Cassiday—afterwards Lieutenant William McConnell, Flag Lieutenant, COMADTACZONSOPAC
- Vice Admiral John "Blackjack" Broderick, USN, Commander, Southwest Pacific Area Three
- Commander Neal Owynn, USNR (formerly of the US Senate), Broderick's chief aide (and, briefly, liaison to COMADTACZONSOPAC)
- Ensign, afterwards Lieutenant, junior grade Jeremiah Farr Torrey, USNR ("Rock" Torrey's son from his previous marriage), assigned as Executive Officer aboard a PT boat eventually attached to COMADTACZONSOPAC
- Lieutenant Maggie Haynes, NC, USNR, a nurse
- Ensign Annalee Dohrn, NC, USNR, another nurse
- Beverly McConnell, Mac McConnell's wife
- Beth Eddington, Paul Eddington's wife
- Admiral Husband Kimmel, USN, Commander-in-chief Pacific (CinCPAC) at the outbreak of World War II; not named directly in the novel.
- Admiral Chester Nimitz, USN, Commander-in-chief Pacific (CinCPAC) for the rest of the war; not named directly in the novel.

== Allusions/references to actual history, geography and current science ==
This novel is set during World War II and depicts a fictitious amphibious operation in the Southwestern Pacific theater of that war. As such, it includes at least two historical figures as characters (see above) and makes allusions to several others, including President Franklin D. Roosevelt and Admiral Ernest King.

Operations, names of ships (except for the Japanese battleship Yamato), Southwest Pacific islands and their names, and characters and their names (except for Admirals King, Nimitz, and Kimmel) are fictitious. Specifically, no such operation named "Mesquite" or "Skyhook" ever took place in any theater of war—but the drama surrounding those operations could represent any number of real dilemmas that Admiral Nimitz might have faced during his management of the Pacific theater.

== Film, TV or theatrical adaptations ==
This novel was adapted for film in 1965 under the title In Harm's Way by Otto Preminger. John Wayne appeared as Rock Torrey, Kirk Douglas as Paul Eddington, Patricia Neal as Maggie Haynes, Brandon deWilde as Jere Torrey, Burgess Meredith as Egan Powell, Tom Tryon and Paula Prentiss as Mac and Beverly McConnell, and Franchot Tone and Henry Fonda as Admiral Kimmel and Admiral Nimitz.

== Release details ==
- 1962, US, The World Publishing Company, LOC 62–21442, hardcover
