= Peaceable Kingdom (TV series) =

American television series

- Genre: Family drama
- Created by: Art Monterastelli
- Based on: The Peaceable Kingdom: A Year In the Life of America's Oldest Zoo by John Sedgwick
- Developed by: Mark Waxman
- Starring: Lindsay Wagner; Tom Wopat; David Ackroyd
- Composers: David McHugh; Jack Smalley
- Country of origin: United States
- Original language: English
- No. of seasons: 1
- No. of episodes: 12 (5 unaired)

Production
- Executive producer: Mark Waxman
- Running time: 60 minutes
- Production companies: Victoria Productions; Columbia Pictures Television

Original release
- Network: CBS
- Release: September 20 – November 15, 1989

Peaceable Kingdom is an American family drama television series that aired on CBS from September 20 until November 15, 1989. The series, created by Art Monterastelli and developed by Mark Waxman, was a joint production of Victoria Productions in association with Columbia Pictures Television for CBS. It was cancelled after only seven episodes (though twelve episodes were produced).

== Overview ==
Peaceable Kingdom stars Lindsay Wagner as the recently hired managing director of the Los Angeles County Zoo, who was also recently widowed with three children. Her zoologist colleagues included Tom Wopat and David Ackroyd.

Perhaps due to scheduling competition from other networks (NBC's Top 20 hit Unsolved Mysteries and ABC's Top 30 hits Growing Pains and Head of the Class), Peaceable Kingdom was a ratings failure and CBS cancelled the series after seven episodes. The remaining episodes aired some years later in syndication.

Some scenes of the series was shot on location at the San Diego Zoo and the Los Angeles Zoo.

== Cast ==
- Lindsay Wagner as Rebecca Cafferty
- Melissa Clayton as Courtney Cafferty
- Michael Manasseri as Dean Cafferty
- Victor Di Mattia as Sam Cafferty
- David Ackroyd as Dr. Bartholomew Langley
- Tom Wopat as Dr. Jed McFadden
- Conchata Ferrell as Kate Galindo
- David Renan as Sequoya Ridge
- Kathryn Spitz as Robin

== Episodes ==
No.	Title	Directed by	Written by	Original release date
1	"Pilot"	Paul Krasny	Art Monterasellli	September 20, 1989
2	"Snakebite"	Robert Becker	Sharon Doyle	September 27, 1989
3	"Bison"	Beth Hillshafer	Mark Waxman	October 4, 1989
4	"Aardvark"	Jerry Jameson	Story by : Michael Vittes & Karen Harris; Teleplay by : Karen Harris	October 11, 1989
5	"Reunion"	Betty Thomas	Parke Perine	November 3, 1989
6	"Elephant"	Tommy Lee Wallace	Bryce Zabel	November 8, 1989
7	"Symphony"	Robert Becker	Steve Wasserman & Jessica Klein	November 15, 1989
8	"Jaguar"	Michael Vittes	Story by : Michael Vittes & Karen Harris; Teleplay by : Karen Harris	UNAIRED
9	"Kitty"	Mike Fresco	Larry Barber & Paul Barber	UNAIRED
10	"Lone Wolf"	Seymour Robbie	James Novack	UNAIRED
11	"Chimp"	Jerry Jameson	Misty Stewart-Taggart	UNAIRED
12	"Moonstruck"	Mike Fresco	Story by : Kathy McCormick & Sharon Doyle; Teleplay by : Sharon Doyle	UNAIRED
