= Three Violent People =

1956 film by Rudolph Maté

- Film poster
- Directed by: Rudolph Maté
- Written by: James Edward Grant
- Story by: Leonard Praskins; Barney Slater
- Produced by: Hugh Brown
- Starring: Charlton Heston; Anne Baxter; Gilbert Roland; Tom Tryon; Forrest Tucker; Bruce Bennett; Elaine Stritch
- Cinematography: Loyal Griggs
- Edited by: Alma Macrorie
- Music by: Walter Scharf
- Production company: Paramount Pictures
- Distributed by: Paramount Pictures
- Release date: February 9, 1957
- Running time: 99 minutes
- Country: United States
- Language: English
- Box office: $1.2 million (US rentals)

Three Violent People is a 1957 American Western film directed by Rudolph Maté and starring Charlton Heston, Anne Baxter, Gilbert Roland, Tom Tryon, Forrest Tucker, Bruce Bennett, and Elaine Stritch.

== Plot ==
Former Confederate cavalryman Capt. Colt Saunders comes home to Texas from the war during the Reconstruction era. Carpetbaggers have taken control of his town, including a corrupt Yankee tax commissioner named Harrison and his deputy Cable. When he sees a Yankee insult a Southern belle named Lorna Hunter, the gallant Colt comes to her aid. He isn't aware of her past as a St. Louis dance-hall girl (prostitute) or her devious golddigging nature. Colt is knocked cold and Lorna takes him back to his room, where she steals $900 from him. Her former employer, saloon owner Ruby LaSalle, lets her know that Colt is a wealthy rancher, so Lorna hatches a scheme. She returns his missing $900 and impresses him with her "honesty." Colt falls in love and marries her.

His ranch, the Bar S, has fallen on hard times. Loyal grand vaquero Innocencio Ortega, who looked out for the spread with his five sons while Colt was off to war, says that Yankees have been rustling their horses with no intervention by the law. Harrison is using a usurious tax law passed by the provisional government to seize all the large ranches in the district. Colt's black sheep brother, nicknamed Cinch, shows up to claim a share of the ranch. Cinch is not trustworthy, but Colt has felt obligated to him since a childhood accident when he lost an arm. Cinch is allowed to help run the ranch.

Lorna comes to love Colt but one of Harrison's minions, Massey, recognizes her from her days in St. Louis. Harrison and Cable serve Colt a writ for $16,000 in newly assessed taxes. They plot to have Massey insult Lorna so that they can shoot Colt when he goes to defend her. Innocencio and his sons foil the plot but a disillusioned Colt orders Lorna to leave, throwing her gold coins in "payment for services rendered." Cinch grabs the opportunity to make off with a hidden herd of valuable horses Colt needs to pay the taxes, enlisting the embittered Lorna to help him.

Colt tracks them down, sending Lorna back to the Bar S and warning Cinch to never set foot on the ranch again. Innocencio tells him that Lorna is pregnant and Colt offers her the value of his horses if she agrees to stay and give birth, leaving the child with him. Meanwhile, Cinch goes to Harrison proposing to kill Colt for him and grab control of the Bar S as partners. On the sly, Harrison and Cable plot to also murder Cinch, Lorna and everyone else at the ranch who could be a witness.

Colt and Innocencio have a falling out over his treatment of Lorna and the foreman prepares to leave with his sons. Lorna gives Colt the child as agreed but refuses to accept the offered bribe. Cinch returns, planning to provoke Colt into a gunfight. Things don't go according to plan, and when Harrison and his gang arrive, Cinch and Cable shoot each other in the fight that ensues. Harrison and Massey are also killed. Afterwards, Colt has a change of heart and reconciles with Lorna.

== Cast ==
- Charlton Heston as Capt. Colt Saunders
- Anne Baxter as Lorna Saunders, née Hunter
- Gilbert Roland as Innocencio Ortega
- Tom Tryon as Beauregard 'Cinch' Saunders
- Forrest Tucker as Deputy Commissioner Cable
- Bruce Bennett as Commissioner Harrison
- Elaine Stritch as Ruby Lasalle
- Barton MacLane as Yates
- Peter Hansen as Lt. Marr
- John Harmon as Mr. Massey
- Ross Bagdasarian as Asuncion Ortega
- Bobby Blake as Rafael Ortega
- Jameel Farah as Pedro Ortega
- Leo Castillo as Luis Ortega
- Don Devlin as Juan Ortega
- Raymond Greenleaf as Carleton
- Roy Engel as Carpetbagger
- Argentina Brunetti as Maria

== Reception ==
=== Critical response ===
The New York Times review of the film was: "THREE VIOLENT PEOPLE, the Paramount Western in VistaVision and color that opened Saturday at the Globe, hoards most of its violence for a rootin'-shootin' finale. But not the talk, assuredly. Even more tiring is the leaden baton-wielding of director Rudolph Maté. [...] Charlton Heston, Anne Baxter and Gilbert Roland are co-starred, and literally hog-tied, in this Hugh Brown production penned by James Edward Grant. Could things have been different? Very easily. For one thing, the cast is small but trim, including such hearties as Bruce Bennett, Forrest Tucker and that hardiest of hearties, Barton MacLane. Add two personable young newcomers from Broadway, Tom Tryon and Elaine Stritch, whose brief portrait of a saloon hostess all but salvages the film. There have been worse plots. A nice enough saloon transient; Miss Baxter, tricks a stalwart ranch heir, Mr. Heston, into marriage and settles down with him for true love and happiness, she thinks. Comes trouble—to wit, his one-armed psychotic young brother, Mr. Tryon, and a gang of greedy Reconstruction officials, Yankees. And with the bride's seemingly mild past disclosed, Mr. Heston all but heaves her off the old rancho."

DVD Talk's review of the film was: "A soapy Western redeemed somewhat by an exciting climatic shoot-out, Three Violent People (1957) re-teamed Charlton Heston with his Ten Commandments co-star, Anne Baxter. This was shot just as De Mille's epic was wrapping production and in the can even before The Ten Commandments was released. [...] Director Rudolph Maté does a good job with the action sequences and gives the entire production a nice polish, but the former cinematographer doesn't seem to have been much of an actor's director. There's no connection, incidentally, to Maté's The Violent Men, which was released to DVD by Columbia/TriStar just last month. This Paramount production was announced as Maverick but released as the equally-inapt Three Violent People. Heston and Tryon are the first two, I suppose, but who's the third violent man? Forrest Tucker? Gilbert Roland? Harry Lime?"

=== Release ===
Three Violent People was released in theatres on February 9, 1957. The film was released on DVD April 19, 2005, by Paramount Home Media Distribution.

== See also ==
- List of American films of 1957
