= In Harm's Way =

1965 film by Otto Preminger

- Theatrical release poster by Saul Bass
- Directed by: Otto Preminger
- Screenplay by: Wendell Mayes
- Based on: Harm's Way; 1962 novel by James Bassett
- Produced by: Otto Preminger
- Starring: John Wayne; Kirk Douglas; Patricia Neal; Tom Tryon; Paula Prentiss; Brandon deWilde; Jill Haworth; Dana Andrews; Henry Fonda; Stanley Holloway; Burgess Meredith; Franchot Tone; Patrick O'Neal; Carroll O'Connor; Slim Pickens; James Mitchum; George Kennedy; Bruce Cabot; Barbara Bouchet
- Cinematography: Loyal Griggs
- Edited by: George Tomasini; Hugh S. Fowler
- Music by: Jerry Goldsmith
- Distributed by: Paramount Pictures
- Release date: April 6, 1965
- Running time: 167 minutes
- Country: United States
- Languages: English; French; Japanese
- Box office: $4,500,000 (US/Canada rentals)

In Harm's Way is a 1965 American epic historical romantic war film produced and directed by Otto Preminger and starring John Wayne, Kirk Douglas, and Patricia Neal. The supporting cast featured Henry Fonda in a lengthy cameo, Tom Tryon, Paula Prentiss, Stanley Holloway, Burgess Meredith, Brandon deWilde, Jill Haworth, Dana Andrews, and Franchot Tone. Produced with Panavision motion picture equipment, it was one of the last black-and-white World War II epics, and Wayne's last black-and-white film. The screenplay was written by Wendell Mayes, based on the 1962 novel Harm's Way, by James Bassett.

The film begins with the Navy's point of view during the Japanese attack on Pearl Harbor and follows the lives of several U.S. naval officers based in Hawaii and their lovers over the first year of the U.S.'s participation in WWII, with Wayne's traditional depiction of a stoic hero juxtaposed against Douglas's study of an emotionally unbalanced officer who commits a number of immoral actions.

== Plot ==
U.S. Navy Captain Rockwell "Rock" Torrey is a divorced son of a career chief petty officer. A Naval Academy graduate and career officer himself, Torrey is removed from command of his heavy cruiser for boldly pursuing the enemy, but then being torpedoed by a Japanese submarine shortly after the attack on Pearl Harbor. Torrey's executive officer, Commander Paul Eddington, is a wayward sort of career officer who has resigned as a naval aviator and returned to the surface navy because of an unhappy marriage. His wife Liz's numerous affairs and drunken escapades have become the talk of Honolulu, and her death during the Pearl Harbor attack—in the company of an Army Air Corps major, with whom she had just had a wild fling on a local beach—drives Eddington into a bar brawl, a stint in the brig, and exile in a hated, land-based logistics command.

After several months of desk duty ashore in Hawaii and recuperation from a broken arm he suffered in the attack on his cruiser, Torrey finds his way into a romance with a divorced Navy Nurse Corps lieutenant named Maggie Haynes, who tells him that his estranged son Jeremiah is now an ensign in the Naval Reserve. A strained visit with Jeremiah brings Torrey in on a South Pacific island-hopping offensive codenamed "Skyhook", which is under command of the overly cautious and micro-managing Vice Admiral B.T. Broderick. On additional information from his roommate, intelligence officer Egan Powell, Torrey guesses that the aim of Skyhook is to capture a strategic island named Levu-Vana, whose central plain would make an ideal airfield for B-17 bomber squadrons. Shortly thereafter, Maggie informs him that her unit is to be shipped out to the same area in preparation for the offensive.

In the summer of 1942, Torrey is promoted to rear admiral and given tactical command of Skyhook, an assignment requiring the same sort of guts and gallantry he previously displayed as commanding officer of his cruiser. He personally selects Eddington to be his chief of staff, and infuriates Broderick by immediately planning and executing an operation to overrun Gavabutu, an island to be used as a staging base for the invasion of Levu-Vana. This proves unexpectedly easy, as the Japanese have withdrawn their garrisons from Gavabutu. As Torrey turns his attention to Levu-Vana, his attempts to secure more materiel and manpower are frustrated by General Douglas MacArthur's simultaneous and much larger campaign in the Solomon Islands. Reconnaissance aircraft prove especially difficult to acquire, and surface combatant forces amount to little more than several cruisers and destroyers, including Torrey's former command.

Meanwhile, Eddington's instability drives him to rape navy nurse Annalee Dohrn, who is engaged to Jeremiah. The traumatized Annalee, fearing she might be pregnant, tries to tell Eddington, but he does not believe her, and she later commits suicide with an overdose of sleeping pills. As the truth is about to be revealed, Eddington – still a qualified aviator – commandeers a PBJ patrol bomber and flies solo on an unauthorized reconnaissance flight to locate elements of the Japanese fleet. He goes down in a fiery death in a redeeming act of sacrifice, giving advance warning of a large Japanese task force centered around the super-battleship Yamato, on its way to blast Torrey's much smaller force off the islands.

Despite the new seaborne threat, Torrey nevertheless mounts the invasion of Levu-Vana, and proceeds with a full attempt to turn back the enemy force. Tragically, Jeremiah is killed during a nighttime PT boat action when a Japanese destroyer rams into his PT boat after the commander's death. The following morning has a pitched surface action off the shores of Levu-Vana, with the Americans drawing first blood and the Yamato decimating much of the U.S. force in response. Severely injured at the height of the battle, Torrey is rescued by his flag lieutenant, William "Mac" McConnell, and is returned to Pearl Harbor aboard a hospital ship under Maggie's devoted care. Expecting to be court-martialed, Torrey is instead congratulated on successfully repelling the Japanese advance and allowing his Marines to take Levu-Vana.

== Cast ==
- John Wayne as Captain (later Rear Admiral) Rockwell W. "Rock" Torrey USN
- Kirk Douglas as Commander (later Captain) Paul Eddington, USN
- Patricia Neal as Lieutenant Maggie Haines, Nurse Corps, USNR
- Tom Tryon as Lieutenant (junior grade) (later Lieutenant and Lieutenant Commander) William "Mac" McConnell, USN
- Paula Prentiss as Beverly McConnell
- Brandon deWilde as Ensign (later Lieutenant (junior grade)) Jeremiah Torrey, USNR
- Jill Haworth as Ensign Annalee Dorn, Nurse Corps, USNR
- Dana Andrews as Vice Admiral B. T. "Blackjack" Broderick, USN
- Stanley Holloway as Clayton Canfil, Australian remittance man coastwatcher
- Burgess Meredith as Commander Egan T. Powell, USNR, based on Commander (later Rear Admiral) Gene Markey, USNR
- Franchot Tone as CINCPAC I, based on Admiral Husband E. Kimmel, USN.
- Patrick O'Neal as Commander (and former U.S. Congressman) Neal Owynn, USNR
- Carroll O'Connor as Commander (later Captain) Burke, USN, based on, and named after, Captain (later Admiral) Arleigh Burke.
- Slim Pickens as Chief Petty Officer Culpepper, USN
- James Mitchum as Ensign Griggs, USN
- George Kennedy as Lieutenant Colonel Gregory, USMC
- Bruce Cabot as Chief Petty Officer Quoddy, USN
- Barbara Bouchet as Liz Eddington
- Tod Andrews as Captain Tuthill, USN
- Larry Hagman as Lieutenant (junior grade) Cline, USN
- Stewart Moss as Ensign Balch, USN
- Richard Le Pore as Lieutenant (junior grade) Tom Agar, USN
- Chet Stratton as Ship's Doctor
- Soo Young as Tearful Woman
- Dort Clark as Boston
- Phil Mattingly as PT Boat Skipper
- Henry Fonda as CINCPAC II, based on Admiral Chester W. Nimitz, USN.

=== Uncredited cast ===
- Yankee Chang as Mortuary Clerk
- Fritz Ford as Man at Mess Tent
- Christopher George as Sailor
- Jerry Goldsmith as Piano Player
- Joe Ruszas as Sailor
- Hal Needham as USAAC Officer
- Hugh O'Brian as USAAC Major

== Background and production ==
Wendell Mayes, who wrote the script, had worked on the project when Preminger was in Europe, and then paused on it when the film was called off. He commenced writing it again two years later which he felt helped the script because by that stage he had forgotten the novel and could approach it more freshly. However Mayes called the film his least fond "out of the three pictures I've done for Otto, and this was probably because it seemed to me to be a twice-told tale." However he liked some things like the romance between John Wayne and Patricia Neal.

Mayes wanted John Wayne to die at the end while the son lived but Otto Preminger felt audiences would not accept John Wayne dying. "I didn't much care for the Kirk Douglas character," said Mayes. "I thought he was sort of dragged in. He had a few things that were rather good, but actually that gung ho, derring-do, flying the plane after raping the girl, somehow doesn't seem part of the story to me; it seems like something else. I could have written a picture about the character that Douglas played. If we could have done more with the character, it would have been more interesting to me."

John Wayne's low-key performance was thought to be because he was seriously ill with lung cancer when the film was made. Shortly after filming ended in September 1964, he was diagnosed with the disease and a month later underwent surgery to remove his entire left lung and two ribs. Co-star Franchot Tone was soon to also develop lung cancer, and died of the disease in September 1968. George Tomasini, one of the film's editors, died months before the film was released.

This was Patricia Neal's last film before suffering three life threatening cerebral aneurysms while pregnant which took her two years to recover from. Neal did not make another film until she was cast as the mother in The Subject Was Roses in 1968.

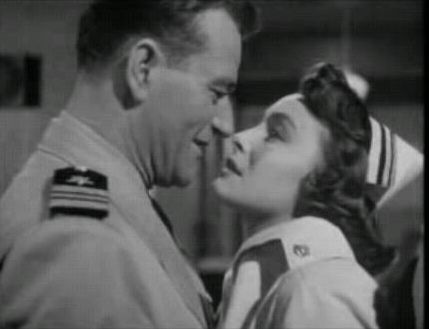
John Wayne with Patricia Neal as a nurse in their earlier film together, Operation Pacific (1951)

Many of the non-military costumes and hairstyles worn by the women throughout the film were contemporary to the mid-1960s period during which the film was made, rather than of the early 1940s. This is particularly noticeable at the dance that opens the film. Many of the extras in this scene were, in fact, current active-duty military officers and their spouses assigned to various commands on Oahu.

The film was shot in black-and-white by Loyal Griggs, who composed his scenes in a wide-screen Panavision format often using deep focus. Griggs was nominated for an Academy Award for Best Cinematography for his work. Jerry Goldsmith's musical score is also notable, as is the work of Saul Bass in the credit titles sequence (this sequence comes at the end of the film, a departure at the time from the norm in a major Hollywood production).

The film received extensive cooperation from the U.S. Department of Defense, especially the U.S. Navy and the U.S. Marine Corps, with substantial filming occurring both aboard warships at sea and ashore at Naval Station Pearl Harbor (to include Ford Island) and Marine Corps Air Station Kaneohe Bay.

Stanley Holloway played Australian coastwatcher Clayton Canfil. A number of coastwatchers appeared on screen in the early 1960s in part due to increased awareness of their role in the war (President John F. Kennedy's life had been saved by a coastwatcher).

One of many problems encountered during production was that at the time of the filming (mid- and late 1964), very few ships then in active Navy service resembled their World War II configuration of two decades earlier. Only one WW II-vintage heavy cruiser, the USS Saint Paul, still retained most of her wartime configuration (and as a result, she stood in for a couple of unnamed cruisers during the movie), although she did not enter service until 1943, and an accompanying destroyer, USS Philip, which entered service in 1942, took on the role of USS Cassiday, and were extensively filmed on. Other U.S. Navy ships that participated included the cruiser USS Boston (though only the forward two-thirds of the ship could be shown, as she had missiles installed aft), destroyers USS Braine, O'Bannon, Renshaw, and Walker, submarine Capitaine, and attack transport USS Renville. All of the destroyers had to have their modern (1960s) antisubmarine warfare gear covered over with fake gun mounts or deck houses. Additional smaller vessels were provided in support, as well as an HU-16 Albatross amphibious aircraft painted in World War II markings, though said aircraft did not enter the U.S. military inventory until 1949. The HU-16 likely substitutes for a PBY Catalina, of which no flyable examples were likely available for the film schedule at that time.

Another anachronism is the widespread use of the M151 light utility vehicle as a World War II jeep, instead of the World War II-era Willys MB and/or Ford GPW, the M151 having not even entered production until 1959. Also used were a few 1950s-vintage 63-ft U.S. Coast Guard rescue launches that were made over to resemble Elco 80-ft PT boats, as the few that existed were not available for use.

Near the start of the film, reference is made to the "picket destroyer Ward" dropping depth charges on what she believes to be a submarine near the entrance to Pearl Harbor. This refers to USS Ward, which dropped depth charges on what has since been established to be a Japanese two-man mini-submarine. The incident appears in the 1970 film Tora! Tora! Tora!. USS Ward was sunk by kamikaze action in December 1944.

== Reception ==
In Harm's Way was nominated for the 1965 Academy Award for Best Cinematography (Black-and-White) for cinematographer Loyal Griggs at the 38th Academy Awards. It was also screened at the 1965 Cannes Film Festival, but was not entered into the main competition.

Patricia Neal received a 1966 BAFTA Film Award as Best Foreign Actress for her performance in the film at the 19th British Academy Film Awards.

=== Critical response ===
The film received mixed reviews from critics. The film holds a 37% rating on Rotten Tomatoes, based on 19 reviews. Bosley Crowther of The New York Times panned the film, observing, "This is a slick and shallow picture that Mr. Preminger puts forth here, a straight, cliché-crowded melodrama of naval action in the Pacific in World War II" and characterized it as "a film that is virtually awash with flimsy and flamboyant fellows with all the tricks of the trade of Hollywood".

Meanwhile, other reviews have been more positive. Stanley Kauffmann of The New Republic wrote, "Preminger's latest is simply one more overlong epic of the naval war against the Japanese, with conventional story lines, characters, resolution." Bruce Eder, writing for AllMovie, states:

In Harm's Way has endured extraordinarily well for an epic war movie made in the 1960s, owing to a multitude of virtues. For starters, it was the last big-budget, all-star Hollywood movie to be shot in black-and-white, and that gives the film a harder, sharper, more defined edge than it ever could have had if it had been photographed in color. ... Add to those virtues the unexpectedly lively pacing and stunning special effects ... and In Harm's Way seems like a very fast-moving two and a half hours.

== In popular culture ==
- In Harm's Way was shown on television during the opening scene of the 1968 comedy film Skidoo, which was also directed by Otto Preminger.

== See also ==
- List of American films of 1965
- John Wayne filmography
