= James Bassett (author) =

American newspaper editor and author

- Born: October 18, 1912; Glendale, California, U.S.
- Died: September 26, 1978 (aged 65); Malibu, California, U.S.
- Education: Bowdoin College
- Occupations: Journalist, writer
- Known for: Harm's Way
- Spouse: Wilma Moreland
- Children: 1

James Elias Bassett Jr. (October 18, 1912 – September 26, 1978) was an American newspaper editor and author, most notably of the best-selling novel Harm's Way, which was later adapted into the motion picture In Harm's Way.

== Biography ==
The son of James E. and Lucille R. Bassett, Bassett was born in Glendale, California. (Note: Bassett's 1940 draft registration card listed his place of birth as "Casa Verdugo, California".)

Raised in Mamaroneck, New York, from 1914 on, in 1934 he graduated cum laude from Bowdoin College in Maine, where he was a member of Phi Beta Kappa. After college, he returned to Los Angeles and joined the Los Angeles Times as a reporter. He later served the paper as aviation writer, political analyst and director of the editorial pages until he was named associate editor in 1971. At the Mirror, the Times' sister publication, he held the posts of political editor, feature editor and city editor.

Bassett entered the United States Navy as lieutenant (junior grade) in February 1941. He and his wife were in Hawaii during the attack on Pearl Harbor, as Bassett was serving on the public relations staff of Admiral Husband E. Kimmel. Bassett went on to become public relations officer for Fleet Admiral William F. (Bull) Halsey and was awarded the Bronze Star with combat V. Bassett later retired from the service as a captain, and returned to work at the Times.

Bassett's works include Commander Prince, USN, published in 1971, a novel dealing mainly with the events surrounding the Battle of the Java Sea, and The Sky Suspended, published in 1968.

Bassett retired October 1977 after serving 43 years on the staffs of the Los Angeles Times and Mirror. He was working on two books at the time of his death—one an autobiography and the other a volume on great sea admirals he had observed in the Pacific Theater of World War II. He died in Malibu, California, and was survived by his wife and a daughter. His ashes were scattered at sea.
