= Argentina Brunetti =

Argentine actress (1907–2005)

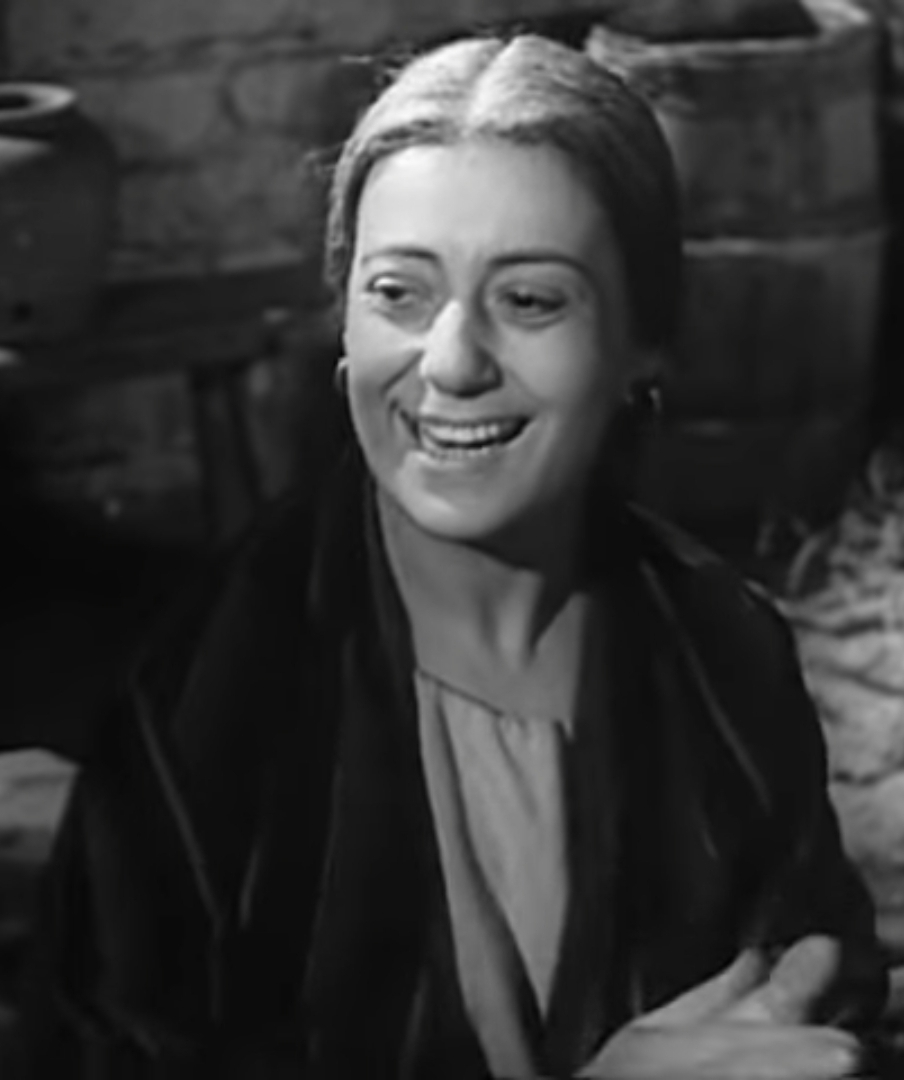
- Brunetti in The Fighter (1952)
- Born: Argentina Josefina Ángela Ferraù; August 31, 1907; Buenos Aires, Argentina
- Died: December 20, 2005 (aged 98); Rome, Italy
- Occupation: Actress
- Years active: 1910–2002
- Spouse(s): Vladimiro Brunetti (m. 1936; died 1966)
- Children: 1

Argentina Brunetti (born Argentina Josefina Ángela Ferraù; August 31, 1907 – December 20, 2005) was an Argentine stage and film actress and writer.

== Early life ==
Brunetti was born Argentina Ferraù in Buenos Aires, Argentina, to Italian parents; her father was Vincenzo "Vicente" Ferraù and her mother was the Sicilian actress Mimi Aguglia. She began her show-business career at the age of three with a walk-on role in the opera Cavalleria rusticana and followed in the footsteps of her mother, performing supporting roles on stage throughout Europe and South America. In 1928, she and her family immigrated to the United States.

== Career ==
In 1937, she was placed under contract to Metro-Goldwyn-Mayer and began dubbing the voices of Jeanette MacDonald and Norma Shearer into Italian. She became a narrator for the Voice of America, interviewing American movie stars for broadcast in Italy. At the same time, she made her movie debut in the classic It's a Wonderful Life (1946) as Mrs. Maria Martini.

Brunetti wrote and performed in daily radio shows; she became a member of the Hollywood Foreign Press Association, writing numerous articles on Hollywood personalities; she authored books, wrote music, and appeared in nearly 60 television programmes and almost 70 films. She hosted a weekly weblog on the Internet called Argentina Brunetti's Hollywood Stories, which her son plans to continue running, and wrote a biographical novel called In Sicilian Company. She continued to act into her nineties, most notably as a relative from the Old World who visits and stays with the (wrong) Barone family in a 1998 episode of Everybody Loves Raymond; her last role was in 2002.

== Personal life ==
She wed Miro Brunetti, a foreign correspondent in Hollywood. The two helped to co-found the Hollywood Foreign Press Association. The couple had one son, Mario. Miro Brunetti died in 1966. Argentina Brunetti never remarried.

== Later life ==
Brunetti moved to Rome in 2004 to be with her family.

== Death ==
Brunetti died on December 20, 2005, aged 98.

== Filmography ==
- Gilda (1946) .... Woman (uncredited)
- The Return of Monte Cristo (1946) .... (uncredited)
- It's a Wonderful Life (1946) .... Mrs. Maria Martini
- California (1946) .... Elvira
- High Tide (1947) .... Mrs. Cresser
- Tycoon (1947) .... Señora Ayora – House Guest (uncredited)
- Tenth Avenue Angel (1948) .... Boy's Mother (uncredited)
- Man-Eater of Kumaon (1948) .... Sita
- Mexican Hayride (1948) .... Indian Woman (uncredited)
- Shockproof (1949) .... Stella (uncredited)
- Knock on Any Door (1949) .... Ma Romano (uncredited)
- El Paso (1949) .... Don Nacho's Woman (uncredited)
- We Were Strangers (1949) .... Mother (uncredited)
- House of Strangers (1949) .... Applicant (uncredited)
- The Red Danube (1949) .... Italian Woman (uncredited)
- Holiday in Havana (1949) .... Mrs. Estrada (uncredited)
- The Silver Theater (1950, TV Series) .... Mama Romani
- The Blonde Bandit (1950) .... Mama Sapelli
- Captain Carey, U.S.A. (1950) .... Villager (uncredited)
- The Lawless (1950) .... Mrs. Rodriguez
- Broken Arrow (1950) .... Nalikadeya, Cochise's Wife (uncredited)
- Dial 1119 (1950) .... Bus Passenger (uncredited)
- Southside 1-1000 (1950) .... Storekeeper Babo's Wife (uncredited)
- Ghost Chasers (1951) .... Mrs. Parelli
- The Great Caruso (1951) .... Signora Barretto
- Sirocco (1951) .... Woman (uncredited)
- Force of Arms (1951) .... Signora Maduvalli (uncredited)
- Rose of Cimarron (1952) .... Red Fawn
- The Fighter (1952) .... Maria
- When in Rome (1952) .... Mrs. Lugacetti
- Bal Tabarin (1952) .... Teresa (uncredited)
- Apache War Smoke (1952) .... Madre
- Woman in the Dark (1952) .... 'Mama' Morello
- The Iron Mistress (1952) .... Duenna (uncredited)
- Hopalong Cassidy (1952, TV Series) .... Senora Soledad
- Racket Squad (1952, TV Series) .... Mrs. Scarpita
- My Cousin Rachel (1952) .... Signora (uncredited)
- Tropic Zone (1953) .... Tia Feliciana
- San Antone (1953) .... Mexican Woman
- The Story of Three Loves (1953) .... Saleswoman (segment "Mademoiselle") (scenes deleted)
- The Caddy (1953) .... Mama Anthony
- King of the Khyber Rifles (1953) .... Lali
- Waterfront (1954, TV Series) .... Mama Ferrera
- Make Haste to Live (1954) .... Mrs. Gonzales
- The Lone Wolf (1954, TV Series) .... Mama Crocetti
- Public Defender (1954, TV Series) .... Mrs. Derek
- Lux Video Theatre (1954, TV Series)
- The Lone Ranger (1955, TV Series) .... Maria
- The Prodigal (1955) .... Townswoman (uncredited)
- Hell's Island (1955) .... Pottery Maker (uncredited)
- The Far Horizons (1955) .... Old Crone
- The Last Command (1955) .... Maria (uncredited)
- Jane Wyman Presents The Fireside Theatre (1955, TV Series) .... Mrs. Adams
- The Tall Men (1955) .... Maria the Dressmaker (uncredited)
- Letter to Loretta (1954–1955, TV Series) .... Mrs. Nardo / Mrs. Ferenzi
- The Rains of Ranchipur (1955) .... Mrs. Adoani (uncredited)
- TV Reader's Digest (1955, TV Series) .... Mrs. Barrett
- The 20th Century-Fox Hour (1956, TV Series) .... Mrs. Rosa Hernandez
- Matinee Theatre (1956, TV Series)
- Celebrity Playhouse (1956, TV Series)
- Anything Goes (1956) .... Suzanne
- Telephone Time (1956, TV Series) .... Senora Valdes
- Alfred Hitchcock Presents (1956, TV Series) (Season 2 Episode 7: "Alibi Me") .... Mrs. Salvatore
- Navy Log (1956, TV Series) .... Mme. Deschamps
- Three Violent People (1956) .... Maria
- Duel at Apache Wells (1957) .... Tia Maria
- The Adventures of Jim Bowie (1957, TV Series) .... Tri Rosa
- Panic! (1957, TV Series) .... Tina D'Alessio
- Code 3 (1957, TV Series) .... Mrs. Morales
- The Unholy Wife (1957) .... Theresa
- The Midnight Story (1957) .... Mama Malatesta
- The Brothers Rico (1957) .... Mrs. Rico
- The Veil (1958, TV Series) .... Maria
- The Thin Man (1958, TV Series) .... Shana Daupha
- Showdown at Boot Hill (1958) .... Mrs. Barabbas
- M Squad (1959, TV Series) .... Mrs. Doris Michaels
- Jet Over the Atlantic (1959) .... Miss Hooten
- Westinghouse Desilu Playhouse (1959, TV Series) .... Elena
- The Detectives Starring Robert Taylor (1960, TV Series) .... Mrs. Moretti
- The Untouchables (1959–1960, TV Series) .... Mrs. Swoboda / Sophia Cestari
- General Electric Theater (1960, TV Series) .... Saral
- Bonanza (1960, TV Series) .... Bruja's Helper
- Rawhide (1960, TV Series) .... Rosa Patines
- The Deputy (1960, TV Series) .... Evita
- Thriller (1960, TV Series) .... Mrs. Romano
- Wanted: Dead or Alive (1960, TV Series) .... Juanita Domingo
- The Roaring Twenties (1960, TV Series) .... Mamma Zorich
- Coronado 9 (1960, TV Series) .... Mrs. Dominguez
- Tales of Wells Fargo (1961, TV Series) .... Maria
- Lock-Up (1961, TV Series) .... Mrs. Voltaire
- Alcoa Presents: One Step Beyond (1960–1961, TV Series) .... Maria Gonzalez / Margarita Castera
- Checkmate (1961, TV Series) .... Berta
- Wagon Train (1961, TV Series) .... Lisa Canevari
- Route 66 (1961, TV Series) .... Senora Maria Otero
- The Lawless Years (1961, TV Series) .... Mama Matteo
- Miami Undercover (1961, TV Series) .... Mrs. Alemada
- The George Raft Story (1961) .... Mrs. Raft
- The Many Loves of Dobie Gillis (1961, TV Series) .... Grandmother
- The Rifleman (1962, TV Series) .... Mrs. Ramirez
- The Horizontal Lieutenant (1962) .... The Nun (uncredited)
- The Pigeon That Took Rome (1962) .... Relative at Easter Dinner (uncredited)
- The Gallant Men (1962, TV Series) .... Mother Superior
- Going My Way (1962–1963, TV Series) .... Mrs. Molletti / Mrs. Severino
- General Hospital (1963, TV Series) .... Filomena Soltini (1985–1988)
- 7 Faces of Dr. Lao (1964) .... Sarah Benedict
- Stage to Thunder Rock (1964) .... Sarita
- Ben Casey (1965, TV Series) .... Mrs. Sanchez
- The Money Trap (1965) .... Aunt
- Gunsmoke (1965, TV Series) .... Louise Danby
- The F.B.I. (1966, TV Series) .... Tia Rodriguez
- The Fugitive (1966, TV Series) .... Mexican Woman
- The Andy Griffith Show .... La Farona (1966, TV Series)
- The Appaloosa (1966) .... Yaqui woman (uncredited)
- The Venetian Affair (1967) .... The Nun (uncredited)
- The Invaders (1967, TV Series) .... Luz
- The Man from U.N.C.L.E. (1967, TV Series) .... Proprietor
- Gomer Pyle - U.S.M.C. (1967, TV Series) .... Cara
- The Big Valley (1968, TV Series) .... Maria
- I Spy (1968, TV Series) .... Chica
- The Shakiest Gun in the West (1968) .... Squaw (uncredited)
- Ironside (1968, TV Series) .... Rita's Aunt
- The Flying Nun (1969, TV Series) .... Consuelo Gomez / Woman #2
- The High Chaparral (1969, TV Series) .... Duena Lopez
- To Rome with Love (1970, TV Series) .... Josie
- The Barefoot Executive (1971) .... Mrs. Bernaducci (uncredited)
- The Streets of San Francisco (1973, TV Series) .... Consuela
- Temperatures Rising (1973, TV Series)
- The Magician (1974, TV Series) .... Landlady
- Kojak (1976, TV Series) .... Christina
- Flight to Holocaust (1977, TV Movie) .... Woman in Elevator
- Wonder Woman (1977, TV Series) .... Manageress
- Black Market Baby (1977, TV Movie) .... Aunt Imelda
- Blue Sunshine (1977) .... Mrs. Rosella
- Quincy, M.E. (1978, TV Series) .... Mrs. Maggiore
- Fantasy Island (1978, TV Series) .... Teresa
- Tenspeed and Brown Shoe (1980, TV Series) .... Celeste Diagusta
- Fatso (1980) .... Zi Jule
- Evita Peron (1981, TV Movie) .... Old woman
- The Quest (1982, TV Series)
- Joanie Loves Chachi (1983, TV Series) .... Aunt Gina
- 1st & Ten (1985, TV Series) .... Mama Arcola
- Booker (1990, TV Series) .... Grandma Petrelli
- The New Adam-12 (1991, TV Series) .... Old Woman on Bus
- Lookin' Italian (1998) .... Grandmother
- Everybody Loves Raymond (1998, TV Series) .... Zia Sarina
- That's Life (2000, TV Series) .... Aunt Rose
- The 4th Tenor (2002) .... Neighbor Woman (final film role)
