= Exo-Man =

1977 television film

- Genre: Action; Adventure; Science fiction; Superhero
- Screenplay by: Henri Simoun; Lionel E. Siegel
- Story by: Martin Caidin; Henri Simoun
- Directed by: Richard Irving
- Starring: David Ackroyd; Anne Schedeen; A Martinez; José Ferrer
- Theme music composer: Dana Kaproff
- Country of origin: United States
- Original language: English

Production
- Executive producer: Richard Irving
- Producer: Lionel E. Siegel
- Cinematography: Enzo A. Martinelli
- Editor: Howard Leeds
- Running time: 95 minutes
- Production company: Universal Television

Original release
- Network: NBC
- Release: June 18, 1977

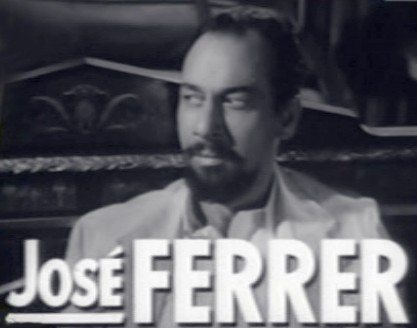

Exo-Man is a 1977 made-for-TV superhero film directed by Richard Irving. The film's screenplay was written by Henri Simoun and Lionel E. Siegel from a story by Martin Caidin and Henri Simoun. It stars David Ackroyd, Anne Schedeen, A Martinez, and José Ferrer.

According to Unsold TV Pilots written by Lee Goldberg the film was intended as a pilot for a continuing series. Goldberg quotes Caidin as claiming the film was not accepted for series production due to lack of merchandising potential, despite relatively successful viewing numbers. However, this claim is suspect because other Universal pilots of the era which did progress to series, notably The Invisible Man and Gemini Man, also lacked merchandising potential.

== Plot ==
Nick Conrad is a young physics professor and researcher. His personal project is to develop a material to convert ultraviolet light directly into mechanical force.

Local criminal kingpin Kermit Haas is told that a fellow crime boss in Chicago has sent a team to rob a local bank, including a trigger-happy nephew. Haas doesn't want to offend his colleague and allows the nephew to participate.

Nick mentors promising undergraduate student Raphael and offers to co-sign a loan so Raphael can study without having to work late nights. The bank robbers enter while they’re completing the loan application. A guard kills two of the robbers and Nick chases and captures the surviving robber, the crime boss’s nephew. Haas gives the order to eliminate Nick to keep him from testifying against the nephew. Rafael warns Nick that he should have police protection before the trial, but Nick is resistant.

Nick makes no progress on his material, as happy-go-lucky lab assistant Eddie is sloppy and doesn’t keep accurate records. During one late night lab session, Nick lets Eddie take his sports car to get pizza. Eddie is killed by a bomb in the car. Nick reluctantly accepts police protection.

Haas’s henchman Emil Horst masquerades as a resident in Nick’s apartment building. He breaks Nick’s back with a steel pipe in the laundry room, but is interrupted by police and has to flee before he can deliver the killing blow. Doctors tell Nick that he is permanently paraplegic. Nick is still determined to testify, until Haas’s lieutenant phones and threatens to kill Emily, Nick's artist girlfriend. Nick changes his mind and refuses to testify, saying the police protection failed him and he will not risk Emily's life. He becomes reclusive and pushes Emily away to ensure her safety. Frustrated and restless, Nick returns to the lab and works alone tirelessly.

Arthur Travis, a representative of the governor’s anti-crime commission, visits Nick on campus and leaves him a mug book to see if he can identify his attacker, assuring him that the police will not be involved. Nick recognizes the photo of Horst but denies that he does. Travis tells Nick that Horst is only a henchman and Haas is the man who ordered his attempted murder, but the only way to stop Haas is to get his records.

Nick goes to an art gallery to see an exhibit of Emily’s artwork. When Emily enters, he flees into an adjacent room – an exhibit of medieval art complete with suits of armor – to avoid her. He draws inspiration from the suits. After many tries, Nick finally is able to produce a successful batch of material. Borrowing expertise, equipment and materials from his fellow physics professors and researchers – including a bulletproof polymer – Nick has a body cast made and fabricates a cuirass and helmet for himself, combining it with chain mail over his limbs and his own material to give him the ability to walk again, as well as invulnerabilty and super-strength. He purchases a step van and equips it with a wheelchair lift and scientific equipment inside, including a clamshell press that clamps over him and encases him in the suit.

Nick reconciles with Emily and apologizes, then secretly arranges for a friend in Boston to give her an exhibition immediately in order to get her out of town.

Nick asks Raphael to have his policeman cousin look into Horst’s record to find out his location and habits. Raphael provides the information. Nick drives to Horst’s house and lures him into a trap by threatening to testify. That night, Horst follows the van to Nick’s warehouse, his base of operations. Nick dons the suit and terrorizes Horst. Horst tries to escape the seemingly invulnerable Exo-Man by climbing a pipe on a wall but it rips free and he falls to his death.

Emily returns prematurely and confronts Nick, knowing that he arranged her art exhibit. He confesses that he was trying to protect her and confides in her about the suit and how he unintentionally caused Horst's death.

Nick gets into the suit again and attacks Haas’s fortified mansion. The guards are unable to stop him. Pursued by Exo-Man, Haas retreats to his basement vault but Exo-Man smashes through the door. The terrified Haas empties his gun at Exo-Man and is puzzled when the lumbering figure only takes his ledger books before leaving.

Travis tells Nick that he received an anonymous tip to look for Haas’s records in a hidden place, which has led to Haas's indictment. As he leaves, he knowingly and cryptically says he would like to discuss more “problems” with Nick.

== Cast ==
- David Ackroyd as Dr. Nicholas Conrad / Exo-Man
- Anne Schedeen as Emily Frost
- A Martinez as Raphael Torres
- José Ferrer as Kermit Haas
- Jack Colvin as Martin, Haas's lieutenant
- Harry Morgan as Arthur Travis
- Martin Speer as District Attorney Kamenski
- Donald Moffat as Dr. Wallace Rogers
- Jonathan Segal as lab assistant Eddie
- Richard Narita as lab assistant Jim

== Reception ==
The movie garnered negative criticism in retrospective reviews from Io9 and Topless Robot. The latter writes, "A series that was bold in its vision of screwing Stan Lee out of a check, Exo Man is an Iron Man clone of the highest order."

== See also ==
M.A.N.T.I.S. - 1994 TV series about a paralyzed scientist who creates a suit to allow himself to walk and to battle crime as a superhero
