= The Other (Tryon novel) =

1971 novel by Thomas Tryon

- First edition cover
- Author: Thomas Tryon
- Language: English
- Series: New York Review of Books Classics
- Genre: Psychological horror
- Published: May 1971
- Publisher: Knopf
- Publication place: United States
- Media type: Print
- Pages: 272
- ISBN: 978-0394467443
- Followed by: Harvest Home (1973)

The Other is a psychological horror novel by American writer Thomas Tryon, published in 1971. It was his debut novel.

Tryon, who had been a working actor, retired from his Hollywood career to become a novelist. Upon its release, the novel received wide critical acclaim and became a surprise bestseller. The Other was adapted into a 1972 film of the same name directed by Robert Mulligan and starring Uta Hagen. The novel was reprinted in a commemorative edition in 2012 by New York Review Books with an afterword by Dan Chaon.

== Plot ==
Set in 1935, the novel focuses on the sadistic relationship between two 13-year-old, identical twin boys Niles and Holland Perry: one of whom is well behaved while the other is a sociopath who wreaks havoc on his family's rural New England farm property.

== Reception ==
The Other spent more than six months on the New York Times best-seller list and sold more than 3.5 million copies.

The Los Angeles Times described the novel as "beautifully, even poetically, wrought". The Cleveland Plain Dealer said that it was "A psychological thriller that you read a second time to see how the author did it". The book was "Truly extraordinary!", according to Kirkus Reviews. "Like most professional writers", Anthony Burgess griped, "I resent Tom Tryon’s The Other, since Tryon should get on with the job of being a good actor and not write good books as well. Enough is enough already. The Other is a highly readable chiller". "A whirlpool of Oh-My-God horror", Ira Levin wrote; "Please congratulate Mr. Tryon for me. What a marvelous job he’s done".
