= The Unholy Wife =

1957 American film by John Farrow

- Theatrical release poster
- Directed by: John Farrow
- Screenplay by: Jonathan Latimer
- Based on: 1956 teleplay The Prowler on Climax! by William Durkee
- Produced by: John Farrow
- Starring: Diana Dors; Rod Steiger; Tom Tryon; Beulah Bondi
- Cinematography: Lucien Ballard
- Edited by: Eda Warren
- Music by: Daniele Amfitheatrof
- Production companies: RKO Radio Pictures; John Farrow Productions
- Distributed by: Universal Pictures
- Release dates: October 1957 (United States); March 6, 1958 (New York City)
- Running time: 94 minutes
- Country: United States
- Language: English

The Unholy Wife is a 1957 Technicolor film noir crime film produced and directed by John Farrow at RKO Radio Pictures, but released by Universal Pictures while RKO was in the process of ceasing its film activities. The film features Diana Dors, Rod Steiger, Tom Tryon and Beulah Bondi. The screenplay was written by William Durkee and Jonathan Latimer.

The plot concerns a femme fatale named Phyllis (Diana Dors) who tells her sordid story from her prison cell in flashback.

Dors later said the film "wasn't good. They edited it badly." The movie's box office failure hurt her career.

== Plot ==
Phyllis tells her story, beginning with how she met rich vintner Paul Hochen from Napa Valley in a bar and married him soon after.

Not long after the marriage, Phyllis begins having an affair with a local rodeo rider, San Sanford, seeing him every time her husband is away, which is frequently. One night, her elderly mother-in-law thinks a burglar is breaking into the house, so she calls the police. Phyllis sees this as an opportunity to kill her husband and blame the burglar for the crime. The plan backfires a day later when she instead kills her husband's best friend. Not wanting to go to jail, she convinces her husband to confess to the killing and they concoct a story that would set him free after the trial.

Phyllis lies at the trial and Paul is put away for murder. The "unholy" wife finally gets the punishment she deserves when her mother-in-law dies of poisoning and the blame goes to Phyllis, who is sent to prison for a crime she did not commit. Later, she faces her execution in the gas chamber.

Finally, Paul shows their son Michael the vineyard that will someday be his.

== Cast ==
- Diana Dors as Phyllis Hochen
- Rod Steiger as Paul Hochen
- Tom Tryon as San Sanford
- Beulah Bondi as Emma Hochen
- Marie Windsor as Gwen
- Arthur Franz as Father Stephen Hochen
- Luis Van Rooten as Ezra Benton
- Joe De Santis as Gino Verdugo
- Argentina Brunetti as Theresa
- Steve Pendleton as Deputy Bob Watkins
- Douglas Spencer as Judge
- Gary Hunley as Michael
- James Burke as Sheriff Tom Watling
- Tol Avery as Dist. Atty. Carl Kramer

== The Prowler ==
The film was based on a TV play, "The Prowler" which was presented on the TV show Climax! starring Claire Trevor, Pat O'Brien and Cameron Mitchell.

There was some talk this play was based on the Woodward case but the host of the show, William Lundigan, denied this in the press, saying the script had been bought six months previously, and was held until Claire Trevor was available to star in it.

The script had been purchased by CBS by William Dozier. When Dozier became head of RKO he purchased the film rights for RKO. Dozier bought two other Climax scripts for filming by RKO – Public Pigeon Number 1 to star Red Skelton and Deal a Blow written by Dozier's son Robert. However these two films would not be made.

== Production ==
RKO was attempting to re-establish itself as a leading filmmaking studio at the time and had numerous projects in development.

The movie was made by John Farrow as the second in a three-film contract he had with RKO. The first was Back from Eternity (1956); there ended up being no third film.

Rod Steiger signed to star in April. Shelley Winters was a leading contender for the female lead. However, in July 1956 the role was given to Diana Dors as part of a long-term contract with RKO; it was her second film in the USA (and for RKO) the first being I Married a Woman (1956).

Ethel Barrymore signed to play Dors' mother-in-law, her first film in two years. However, she changed her mind, fearing the heat of a location shoot in the Napa Valley, and dropped out. Beulah Bondi replaced her.

Filming started in September 1956 on location in the Napa Valley under the title The Lady and the Prowler.

== Reception ==
The New York Times panned the film when it was released, writing, "Indeed, this might be an excellent time for the actress to take inventory or choose a comedy (her real forte). For the new R. K. O. production and Universal-International release, teaming her with Rod Steiger, is a dull, unholy mess, and an absolute waste of anyone's time. Including, we might add, that of the two principals. Pretentiously tinted in garish color, and staged with coronation pomp by director-producer John Farrow, the picture is a hollow, tawdry little drama of frustration, violence and a loveless marriage in California's Napa Valley."

Dors made no more films for RKO. She later sued RKO for defamation of character claiming $1,275,000. She settled out of court for $200,000.

== See also ==
- List of American films of 1957
