= Clive Clerk =

American actor (1945–2005)

- Born: Clive Clerk; 17 October 1945; Trinidad and Tobago
- Died: 22 June 2005 (aged 59); Los Angeles, California, United States
- Other name: Clive Wilson
- Occupations: Actor; dancer; painter; interior designer
- Years active: 1962–2005
- Partner: Tom Tryon (1970–1972)

Clive Clerk (October 17, 1945 – June 22, 2005) was a Trinidad-born actor, dancer and painter, later known as Clive Wilson, who had a successful career as an abstract painter and interior designer. He is best known for his role as David Martin on the NBC daytime soap opera Days of Our Lives (1966–1967) and for originating the role of Larry in the original Broadway cast of the Pulitzer Prize-winning musical A Chorus Line in 1975.

== Early life and education ==
Clerk was born in Trinidad on October 17, 1945. He moved to Canada as a young boy and later, at the age of 17, relocated to New York City to pursue an acting career.

== Career ==
=== Acting and Dance ===
Clive Clerk's career began with the role of Wang San in the road company of Flower Drum Song and a lead part in the 1963 film The Seven Day Idol. He moved to Los Angeles, working in film and television throughout the 1960s and early 1970s. Television appearances included Days of Our Lives (1966–1967), The Mod Squad (1968–1970), I Spy (1966), The Virginian (1966), Combat! (1965), and Happy Days (1970). He also appeared in films such as Send Me No Flowers (1964), Dear Brigitte (1965), and Billie (1965). In 1975, Clerk joined the original Broadway cast of A Chorus Line as Larry, the assistant director/choreographer, and also understudied the role of Zach. He received a special Theatre World award in 1976 for ensemble performance.

=== Art and Design ===
After his performing career, Clerk, as Clive Wilson, became an abstract painter and interior designer. His art was exhibited in galleries, and his interior design work, including the apartment of Tom Tryon, was featured in Architectural Digest.

== Personal life ==
Clerk was in a relationship with actor and writer Tom Tryon during the 1970s. Tryon was intensely private about keeping his homosexuality a secret from his fans and most of his family, which became a major point of tension arose between them. In 1972, Clive and Tom broke up.

== Death ==
Clive Clerk died in Los Angeles, California, on June 22, 2005, at the age of 59.

== Filmography ==
=== Television ===
Year	Title	Role	Notes
1964	The Lieutenant	Dick	Episode: Between Music and Laughter
1964	Profiles in Courage	Johnson	Episode: Richard T. Ely
1964	Mr. Novak	Monty / Eddie / India United States Assembly	Episode: Sparrow on the Wire
1965	Karen	Tony	Episode: Karen Robs the Cradle
1965	Many Happy Returns	Philip	Episode: Three on Honeymoon
1965	CBC Show of the Week	Himself	Episode: Another Side of Young
1965	Combat!	Pierre	Episode: The Convict
1965	Convoy	Morgan	Episode: No More Souvenirs
1966	The Virginian	Tonka	Episode: One Spring Like a Long Ago
1966	Days of Our Lives	David Martin / Man	141 episodes
1966	I Spy	Bashik	Episode: Sparrowhawk
1968	The Rat Patrol	Jean-Claude	Episode: The Double Jeopardy Raid
1968	The Mod Squad	Gandy Schaffler / Allan	Episode: Bad Man On Campus
1968	The High Chaparral	Chatto	Episode: The Stallion
1968	The Name of the Game	Tino Torres	Episode: The Revolutionary
1969	Judd, for the Defense	Ray Deur	Episode: Between the Dark and the Daylight
1969	The New People	Jack	Episode: Panic in the Sand
1970	Happy Days	Handsome Boy	Episode: 9
1970	The Young Rebels	Jonno Devery	Episode: Suicide Squad
1990	The Phil Donahue Show	Himself	1 episode

=== Film ===
Year	Title	Role	Notes
1964	Send Me No Flowers	Vito	
1965	Dear Brigitte	Student	
1965	Billie	Ted Chekas	

== Awards and nominations ==
Year	Award	Category	Result	Title	Ref.
1976	Special Theatre World Awards	Ensemble Performance	Won	A Chorus Line	
