= Folk horror =

Subgenre of horror film and literature

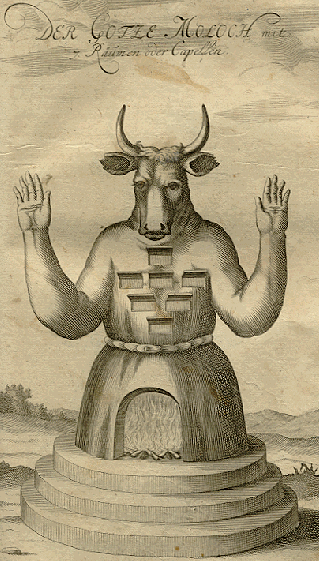
18th century depiction of the Moloch idol which is associated with human sacrifice

Folk horror is a subgenre of horror film and horror fiction that uses elements of folklore to invoke fear and foreboding. Typical elements include a rural setting, isolation, and themes of superstition, folk religion, paganism, sacrifice and the dark aspects of nature. Although related to supernatural horror, folk horror usually focuses on the beliefs and actions of people, rather than the supernatural, and often deals with naive outsiders coming up against these. The British films Witchfinder General (1968), The Blood on Satan's Claw (1971) and The Wicker Man (1973) are pioneers of the genre, while The Witch (2015) and Midsommar (2019) sparked renewed interest in folk horror. Southeast Asian cinema also commonly features folk horror.

== Etymology ==
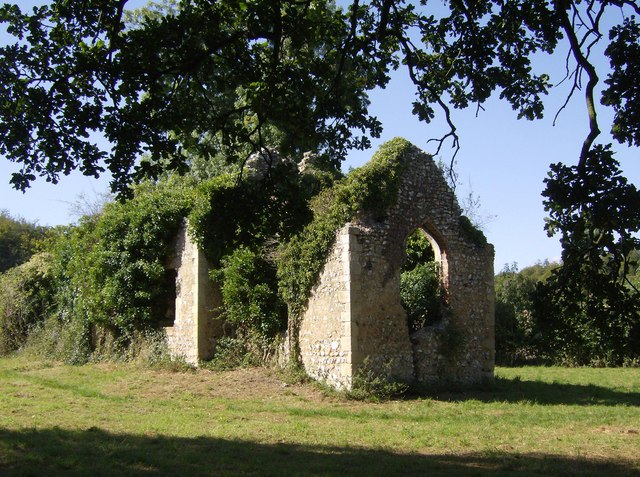
The ruined Saint James Church in Bix Bottom, Oxfordshire was a setting for scenes in The Blood on Satan's Claw.

The earliest known use of the term, though describing an artefact rather than a genre, was in John Fowles' 1965 novel The Magus, in which an African figure is described as "a folk-horror, a corn-doll bundle of black strips of rag that hung down to the ground in a series of skirted flounces."

The term folk horror was used in 1970 in the film magazine Kine Weekly by reviewer Rod Cooper describing the filming of The Devil's Touch; a film that would later be renamed The Blood on Satan's Claw. The director of The Blood on Satan's Claw, Piers Haggard, adopted the phrase to describe his film in a 2004 retrospective interview for the magazine Fangoria. In the interview, Haggard notes how his film contrasted with the Gothic horror films popular in the previous decade:

I grew up on a farm and it's natural for me to use the countryside as symbols or as imagery. As this was a story about people subject to superstitions about living in the woods, the dark poetry of that appealed to me. I was trying to make a folk-horror film, I suppose. Not a campy one. I didn't really like the Hammer campy style, it wasn't for me really.

The term was later popularised by writer and actor Mark Gatiss in his 2010 BBC documentary series A History of Horror (Episode 2, "Home Counties Horror") in which he cited three British-made films—The Blood on Satan's Claw (Piers Haggard, 1971), Witchfinder General (Michael Reeves, 1968), and The Wicker Man (Robin Hardy, 1973)—as genre-defining works.

== Precursors ==
The roots of the horror genre descend directly from ancient folklore and religious traditions focusing on death, the afterlife, evil, the demonic, and the principle of the thing embodied in the person.

During the Renaissance, the Catholic church largely denounced folklore, and its incorporation into literature died out as society tended towards neoclassicalism. Two of the most prominent post-Renaissance works to reincorporate Medieval folklore into literature were Shakespeare's Macbeth and Hamlet, which were criticised as being "corrupt" by editors Samuel Johnson, Lewis Theobald and Sir Thomas Hanmer, 4th Baronet, whose style of editing was based upon that of the Renaissance humanists.

The first movement to revive Medieval folklore was Gothic fiction, with sociologist Robert Miles claiming that in the eighteenth century "for the first time, nostalgia comes into being as a cultural fact". The movement began with Horace Walpole's 1764 novel, The Castle of Otranto, the first edition of which was published disguised as an actual medieval romance from Italy, discovered and republished by a fictitious translator. Once revealed as modern, many found it anachronistic, reactionary or simply in poor taste, but it proved immediately popular. Gothic fiction's incorporation of supernatural folklore elements, such as ghosts, vampires and other undead beings, laid the foundation for the modern concept of horror fiction. At the time, this revival was accredited by William Hazlitt and the Marquis de Sade as deriving from the Age of Revolution's toppling of archaic social structures. Despite the movement's popularity and cultural relevance, however, critics generally continued to pan the style, emphasizing the influence of pre-Renaissance folklore upon the works, to portray the authors as seeking the destruction of the classical order.

== Literature ==
The cultural evolutionism of E. B. Tylor and James Frazer and the witch-cult hypothesis of Margaret Murray influenced a series of writers, who introduced ideas of pagan survivals in their fiction. Influential British turn of the century horror writers M. R. James, Algernon Blackwood and Arthur Machen produced seminal works of folk horror, notably James' collection Ghost Stories of an Antiquary, Machen's novella The Great God Pan and Blackwood's novella The Wendigo.

Maria J. Pérez Cuervo cites Grant Allen's Pallinghurst Barrow (1892), John Buchan's Witch Wood (1927), and Eleanor Scott's Randall's Round (1929) as early examples of folk horror fiction. Cuervo argues that, following the popularity of pagan survival theories, weird fiction and supernatural fiction presented rural areas as "the domain of irrational forces that could only be appeased with certain rituals," often involving animal or human sacrifice.

Shirley Jackson's The Lottery (1948) was described in The Irish Times as "arguably the most influential North American folk horror text".

== Film ==
The Jacques Tourneur film Night of the Demon (1957), based on M.R. James's "Casting the Runes", has been seen by horror historian Darryl Jones as foreshadowing the "folk horror" genre. Night of the Demon features isolated rural settings and countryside people who believe in the supernatural.

Matthew Sweet, in his Archive on 4 documentary Black Aquarius, observes that the late 1960s counterculture movement led to what he terms a "second great wave of pop occultism" which pervaded popular culture, with many film and television works containing elements of folkloric or occult rituals. Adam Scovell, writing for the British Film Institute, describes three films from the late 1960s and early 1970s as the "Unholy Trinity" of Folk Horror: Blood on Satan's Claw, Witchfinder General and The Wicker Man. He says they subvert expectations, having little in common except their nihilistic tone and countryside setting, noting their "emphasis on landscape which subsequently isolates its communities and individuals". He suggests that the rise of the genre at this time was inspired by the 1960s counterculture and New Age movements. Scovell also cites an early example as the 1952 Finnish horror film The White Reindeer, in which a lonely bride is transformed into a vampiric reindeer, an idea derived from Finnish mythology and Sámi shamanism.

The films of Ben Wheatley have been seen as notable films of a modern folk horror revival, particularly Kill List (2011), Sightseers (2012), A Field in England (2013) and In the Earth (2021). Whereas the Unholy Trinity has a very distinctive British flavour, Kier-La Janisse argues in her documentary Woodlands Dark and Days Bewitched: A History of Folk Horror that the genre has culturally specific manifestations in American, Asian, Australian and European horror. Examples of "folk horror" films from the United States include Crowhaven Farm (1970), The Dark Secret of Harvest Home (1978) (an adaptation of Thomas Tryon's 1973 novel), Children of the Corn (1984) (an adaptation of Stephen King's 1976 short story), The Blair Witch Project (1999), and the docudrama Wisconsin Death Trip (1999). The Outcasts (1982) established a tradition of horror films drawing from Irish folklore that continued with You Are Not My Mother (2021) and All You Need Is Death (2023).

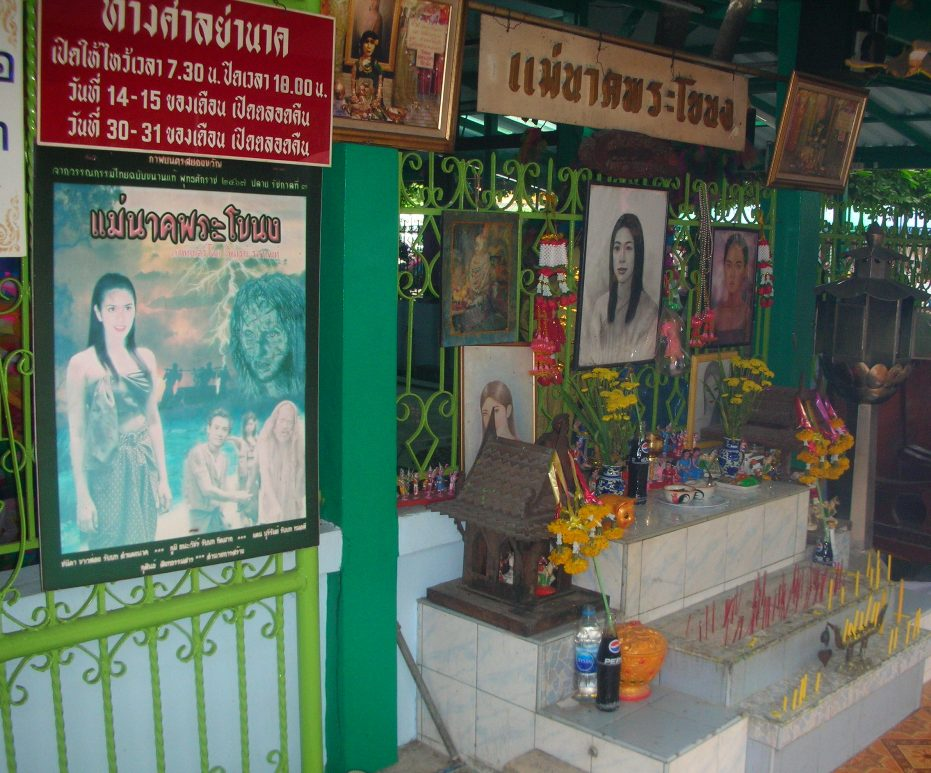
A shrine to Mae Nak Phra Khanong in Bangkok, a ghost in Thai folklore that has inspired several Thai horror films.

Horror films from the Southeast Asia region have frequently drawn upon local folk beliefs, including those of Indonesian, Thai, Malay and Dayak cultures. In a review of The Medium, which draws inspiration from Thai folklore, Kong Rithdee wrote in The Bangkok Post: "International critics will not hesitate to tag The Medium as the latest example of 'folk horror'—think Robert Eggers' The Witch or Ari Aster's Midsommar. But Southeast Asian horror has always been folk horror. It's our default mode, our modus operandi, it's what audiences in this part of the world grew up with—think Nang Nak or Pontianak as classic examples, or more recently, Joko Anwar's Satan Slaves, Syamsul Yusof's Munafik and Emir Ezwan's Roh." Indonesian horror films have featured local folklore for many decades, including Satan's Slave (1980) and Mystics in Bali (1981); in the 2010s, The Queen of Black Magic and Impetigore also attracted international attention. One of the most critically acclaimed folk horror films to have come from South Asia is the film Tumbbad (2018). Other South Asian movies that have incorporated folklore in their plots include Bramayugam (2024) and films of the Maddock Horror Comedy Universe, particularly Stree (2018), Stree 2 (2024) and Munjya (2024).

== Television ==
As well as cinema, rural paganism formed the basis of a number of British television plays of the 1970s; examples from the BBC's Play for Today strand include John Bowen's Robin Redbreast (1970) and A Photograph (1977), David Rudkin's Penda's Fen (1974), and Alan Garner's Red Shift (1978). Adaptations of the antiquarian ghost stories of M. R. James, which derive their horror in cursed objects, medieval superstition, occult practices and witch trials, also provided a regular stream of folkloric horror; from Jonathan Miller's Whistle and I'll Come to You (BBC, 1968) and Lawrence Gordon Clark's yearly A Ghost Story for Christmas strand for the BBC (1971–1978). ITV, meanwhile, produced the Alan Garner adaptation The Owl Service (1969), Nigel Kneale's Beasts (1976) and the HTV drama Children of the Stones (1977), which share a theme of ancient folklore seeping into the modern world.

Matthew Sweet observes that occult and pagan elements even appeared in children's programmes and 1970s episodes of Doctor Who. Comedian Stewart Lee, in his retrospective of The Children of the Stones ("a tale of archaeology, occult ritual and Chopper bikes") identifies that series as part of a "collective Sixties comedown" which includes the genre works The Owl Service, Timeslip (1970), The Tomorrow People (1973), The Changes (1975) and Raven (1977).

From 1984 to 1986, ITV produced the pagan-influenced adventure series Robin of Sherwood. This was a retelling of the Robin Hood legend, which sometimes featured disturbing supernatural elements drawn from British folklore.

The BBC comedy horror series The League of Gentlemen (1999–2017) referenced and homaged several folk horror works in its episodes, including The Wicker Man and Beasts.

Folk horror elements sometimes turn up in American television productions. For instance, The X-Files episode "Home" (1996) has been described by writer Matt Berger as an example of American folk horror.

In the 2020s, television series such as The Third Day and The Red King continued the folk horror tradition.

== Video games ==
Darkwood is a 2017 survival horror game by Acid Wizard Studios that made extensive use of folk horror imagery and themes, notably the rural isolationism, combining them with elements of body horror.

Mundaun is a 2021 first person folk horror video game by Swiss developer Hidden Fields. The atmosphere and imagery has been compared to the folk horror films of Ben Wheatley and Robert Eggers.

The Excavation of Hob's Barrow is a folk horror point-and-click adventure game developed by Cloak and Dagger Games and published by Wadjet Eye Games in 2022. Players assume the role of an antiquarian who is attempting to excavate a mysterious tumulus in rural Northern England during the late Victorian era.

== See also ==
- Art horror
- Postmodern horror
- Haxan
