= David Ackroyd =

American actor (born 1940)

- Ackroyd in 1979
- Born: May 30, 1940 (age 86); East Orange, New Jersey, U.S.
- Occupation: Actor
- Years active: 1965–present
- Spouse: Ruth Liming (1963–present)

David Ackroyd (born May 30, 1940) is an American actor, who first came to prominence in soap operas such as The Secret Storm and Another World.

== Early life ==
On May 30, 1940, Ackroyd was born in East Orange, New Jersey; he moved to Wayne, New Jersey, when he was 12 years old.

== Career ==
David Ackroyd extended his all-stage career into film and television in the early 1970s, beginning with daytime leading man outings in The Secret Storm and Another World. He progressed to work as Gary Ewing in Dallas until Ted Shackelford successfully took over the role when the character moved to the spin-off drama Knots Landing. Ackroyd later appeared on Knots Landing as a guest star, playing a different character.

In the late 1970s, he appeared in the miniseries The Dark Secret of Harvest Home as Nick Constantine; The Word and the TV movies And I Alone Survived and Exo-Man. He costarred in the short-lived series AfterMASH and A Peaceable Kingdom. He had supporting roles in The Mountain Men, Dark Angel and Xena: Warrior Princess. He voiced "John Cavanaugh/Prince Corran of Dar-Shan" in the animated series Wildfire as well as several characters in The New Yogi Bear Show, The Greatest Adventure: Stories from the Bible, The Real Adventures of Jonny Quest and The New Adventures of Captain Planet.

On Broadway, Ackroyd appeared in Unlikely Heroes, a 1971 production of three plays based on the stories of Philip Roth; and Children of a Lesser God, in which he replaced John Rubinstein as the lead character James Leeds in 1981. Since the late 1990s and into the 2000s, Ackroyd has narrated documentaries on TV, including History's Mysteries and UFO Files: "Alien Engineering".

Ackroyd moved to Montana in 1996. In 2003, he co-founded the Alpine Theatre Project in Whitefish, a professional acting company, where he is the artistic development director. The project has featured appearances by Olympia Dukakis, John Lithgow and Kelli O'Hara.

In the years following his co-founding of the Alpine Theatre Project (ATP) in Whitefish, Montana, Ackroyd remained active with the company’s productions and education programs. In 2024, ATP announced a leadership transition to a “next generation” of leaders, naming Tracy McDowell as artistic director and Cynthia Benkelman as executive director, while retaining the founders to assist with the transition.

== Filmography ==
=== Actor ===
- 1971-1974 The Secret Storm as Kevin Kincade
- 1974-1977 Another World as Dr. Dave Gilchrist
- 1975 Kojak as Vincent Hackley
- 1977 Exo-Man as Dr. Nicholas Conrad / Exo-Man
- 1978 Lou Grant as Mike Kessler
- 1978 The Dark Secret of Harvest Home as Nick Constantine
- 1978 The Word as Tom Carey
- 1978 Dallas as Gary Ewing (2 episodes)
- 1978 And I Alone Survived as Jay Fuller
- 1978 The Paper Chase, Season 1, Episode 5: "Voices of Silence" as Eric Ryerson
- 1978 Little Women as Professor Friedrich Bhaer
- 1979 Women in White as Dr. Mike Rayburn
- 1979 Mind Over Murder as Ben Kushing
- 1980 The Yeagers as John David Yeager
- 1980 The Mountain Men as Medicine Wolf
- 1981 A Gun in the House as Joe Cates
- 1982 The Sound of Murder as
- 1982 Knots Landing as Bill Medford
- 1982 Trapper John, M.D. as Dr. Frank Langtry
- 1982 McClain's Law as
- 1982 The Facts of Life as Major Dorsey
- 1983 Cocaine: One Man's Seduction as Bruce Neumann
- 1983 Deadly Lessons as John Ferrar
- 1983 Dynasty as
- 1983 Whiz Kids as Dave Kerns
- 1983 When Your Lover Leaves as Joe Masterson
- 1983 AfterMASH as Dr. Mark Boyer
- 1984 The Sky's No Limit as
- 1984 Hunter as Gus Trancus
- 1984 Cover Up as Prescott
- 1984 Riptide as
- 1985 Hardcastle and McCormick as Eddie Dawson
- 1985 Picking Up the Pieces as Dr. Eric Harding
- 1985 St. Elsewhere as Col. Chuck Cochrane
- 1985 MacGyver as Lucien Trumbo
- 1986 The Nativity as
- 1986 The Children of Times Square as Peter Roberts
- 1986 Stark: Mirror Image as Kenneth Clayton
- 1986 The Greatest Adventure: Stories from the Bible as Angel / Jesus Christ
- 1986 Wildfire as John Cavanaugh / Prince Cavan
- 1986 The A-Team as Major Laskov
- 1986 A Smoky Mountain Christmas as Video Director
- 1987 Nutcracker: Money, Madness and Murder as Jones
- 1987 Tales from the Hollywood Hills: Natica Jackson as
- 1985-1987 Cagney & Lacey as Brian Cagney
- 1987 Poor Little Rich Girl: The Barbara Hutton Story as Graham Mattison
- 1988 Cagney & Lacey
- 1988 Hotel as David Welch
- 1988 Windmills of the Gods as
- 1988 MacGyver as Mr. Knapp
- 1988 Memories of Me as 1st Assistant Director
- 1988 Highway to Heaven as
- 1988 The New Yogi Bear Show as
- 1989 Studio 5-B as J.J. McMillan
- 1989 A Peaceable Kingdom as Dr. Bartholomew Langley
- 1990 Wrestling with God as Robert Owen
- 1990 I Come in Peace as Inspector Switzer
- 1991 History's Mysteries: Drake's Secret Voyage as
- 1991 Hell Hath No Fury as Stanley Ferguson
- 1991 Stop at Nothing as Agent Conroy
- 1992 Breaking the Silence as
- 1992 The Fear Inside as Brandon Cole
- 1992 The Round Table as
- 1993 Dead On as
- 1993 Love, Cheat & Steal as Tom Kerry
- 1993 The New Adventures of Captain Planet as
- 1986-1994 Murder, She Wrote as Bert Lown
- 1994 Against the Wall as William Kunstler
- 1994 Fortune Hunter as Paxton Leeds
- 1994 Walker, Texas Ranger as Jess Morell
- 1995 The Cosby Mysteries as
- 1996 Xena: Warrior Princess as Anteus
- 1996 The Real Adventures of Jonny Quest as Ezekiel Rage
- 1996 Raven as Bill Gilley
- 1997 No Strings Attached as
- 2000 Prison Life as

=== Self ===
- 1998 In Search of History: The Heretic King
- 1998 The Mysteries of Amelia Earhart
- 1998 In Search of History: The First Americans
- 1999 History's Mysteries: The First Detective
- 1999 History's Mysteries: The Inquisition
- 2000 History's Mysteries: Chain Gangs
- 2000 History's Mysteries: Body Snatchers
- 2000 Horror or Hoax
- 2000 History's Mysteries: Ghost Plane of the Desert - Lady Be Good
- 2000 History's Mysteries: Amityville -The Haunting
- 2001 History's Mysteries: Vikings, Fury from the North
- 2005 Meteors: Fire in the Sky
- 2006 UFO Files: Alien Engineering
- 2006 In Search of History: Dragons
- 2007 The Universe

=== Archive footage ===
- 2002 Intimate Portrait
