= Harvest Home (2009 film) =

- Directed by: Craig Whitney
- Written by: Craig Whitney
- Produced by: Stephanie Huettner
- Starring: Diane Hruska, Scott Bate
- Cinematography: Jameson West
- Edited by: James Chesnut
- Production company: Better Archangel Pictures
- Release date: 2009
- Running time: 10 minutes
- Country: United States
- Language: English

Harvest Home is a short film written and directed by Austin filmmaker Craig Whitney and starring Diane Hruska and Scott Bate. The film was produced in 2008 in association with Better Archangel Pictures, and was screened in May 2009 at the Cannes Short Film Corner.

Inspired by the family chamber dramas of Yasujirō Ozu and the analytical depictions of modern life in the films of Michelangelo Antonioni, Harvest Home offers a lyrical and plaintive examination of growing old and enduring life's everyday tragedies in the midst of contemporary society, and the mysterious dichotomy that exists between the tragedy and the banality of our daily misfortunes.

== Plot ==
Emotionally uprooted after the recent death of her husband, Esther Kern (Diane Hruska) is trying to return to normal life after completing her shiva—a weeklong period of family mourning mandated in the Jewish religion. Mrs. Kern's children—a successful ophthalmologist and the wife of a busy businessman—have long since moved away to start families of their own, setting aside the traditions of the Jewish faith for the concerns of daily life.

Tentatively embarking upon her reentry into the world, Mrs. Kern is visited by a cable repairman (Scott Bate), who has come to her house to fix a problem with her reception. Deprived of her lifetime role as both wife and mother, she tries to forge an emotional connection with this stranger—telling stories about her family and bringing him cake and coffee—all in an effort to fill the void left by her recent loss. But unsure of what to make of this unexpected situation, the repairman is at once taken aback and drawn in by the residue of the tragedy that lingers in the home.

== Cast and crew ==
Harvest Home was produced by Stephanie Huettner and filmed by cinematographer Jameson West, both of whom had previously worked with Whitney on Nick Robinson's film I Am Nick Robinson, which was featured at the 2007 South by Southwest Film Festival. West had also previously worked as a second-unit photographer on Austin filmmaker Kat Candler's feature, Jumping Off Bridges.

Writer and director Craig Whitney said in an interview with Short Film Texas that the tension between Mrs. Kern and the repairman was a key element in "Harvest Home"'s thematic concerns.

The film features a cameo appearance by Music & Entertainment Television VJ Brittany Neighbors, who appears as herself during one scene introducing videos on a TV in the room.
