= Harvest Home (novel) =

1973 novel by Thomas Tryon

- First edition
- Author: Thomas Tryon
- Language: English
- Genre: folk horror, psychological horror
- Publisher: Alfred A. Knopf
- Publication date: 1973
- Media type: Hardcover
- Pages: 401
- ISBN: 0-394-48528-9
- OCLC: 595306
- Dewey Decimal: 813/.5/4
- LC Class: PZ4.T8764 Har PS3570.R9

Harvest Home is a 1973 folk horror novel by American writer Thomas Tryon. A New York Times bestseller, the book became an NBC mini-series in 1978 titled The Dark Secret of Harvest Home, which starred Bette Davis (as Mary Fortune) and David Ackroyd (as Nick Constantine). The miniseries was generally faithful to the plot of the book; however, the name of the protagonist was changed in the film from Ned Constantine to Nick Constantine.

== Plot ==
Ned Constantine, his wife Bethany ("Beth"), and their daughter Kate relocate from New York City to an isolated Connecticut village, Cornwall Coombe, where the villagers adhere to "the old ways", eschewing modern agricultural methods and having extremely limited contact with the outside world. As one says, "we don't mess with other folks and we expect them not to mess with us." The villagers celebrate a number of festivals that revolve around the cultivation of corn. The most important festival is "Harvest Home", which takes place once every seven years.

Ned befriends Robert Dodd, a former college professor, who is now blind and largely homebound. Like Ned, Robert was once an outsider who moved to Cornwall Coombe at the behest of his wife Maggie, who was born in the village. Ned also meets, among others, Justin Hooke, who serves as the current ceremonial "Harvest Lord"; Justin's wife, Sophie, his chosen "Corn Maiden" in the approaching "Corn Play"; and Worthy Pettinger, a young man whose dreams of going to agricultural college are frustrated by his parents, who hold to the old ways. The most important person in the village is Mary Fortune. Known as "Widow", the village herbalist and midwife, she herself is childless and has been a widow since the long ago death of her husband, Clem. On two separate occasions when Kate suffers a severe asthma attack, the Widow Fortune saves her life. She later prescribes home remedies which cure Kate entirely. Beth and Kate grow to adore the Widow, but Ned is suspicious of her herbal medicines and finds her unquestioned influence over the town troubling.

Meanwhile, Worthy is chosen as the next "Harvest Lord" who will replace Justin at the end of his seven years of service. Worthy does not wish to become the Harvest Lord, confusing Ned, who understood the title to be an honor. At church, Worthy shouts out a curse upon the corn before fleeing. The Widow announces that Worthy is henceforth "bane" and will be shunned by the village if he ever returns. Meanwhile, Worthy's parents and their goods are shunned because of their son's departure, although they are blameless, protesting they had "raised him right". Ned secretly provides Worthy with money to escape the village, and Worthy promises to write to him. Ned begins to understand that the villagers, led by their women, practice pagan fertility rites to ensure their harvests. He became suspicious of the upcoming Harvest Home, but the most anyone will tell him is that it is "what no man may see nor woman tell". Meanwhile, Worthy's letter from Hartford to Ned (despite using a pseudonym) had been intercepted by Tamar Penrose, the postmistress, who steamed it open. It revealed Worthy's address. A posse was sent to kidnap and return him; he was later killed in the village. Ned is horrified to see Worthy's corpse being burnt in a massive bonfire on Kindling Night, where it had been callously tossed among the scarecrows.

On the day of Harvest Home, Justin's wife, Sophie, unexpectedly commits suicide. She is denied burial in consecrated ground on the orders of the Widow, whom Ned denounces for this cruelty. Dropping the cat and mouse game she had been playing with Ned, she declares him an outcast and has him imprisoned in the village jail to keep him from interfering with Harvest Home. All the women then depart to choose another Corn Maiden. Ned does not eat any food, fearing it is drugged. He manages to escape and returns home to find his car missing and his phone dead. Ned goes to Robert Dodd for help, only to be told that on the night of Harvest Home, all the phones are disabled and all the cars confiscated until morning, while all the men are confined to their homes. Robert reveals that he himself was blinded for attempting to discover the secret of Harvest Home and begs Ned not to go out again. Fearing for his wife and daughter, Ned fatefully ignores the warning and returns to the village.

Ned arrives in time to see the heavily-veiled new Corn Maiden (whom he thinks is Tamar Penrose, who had been Corn Maiden two cycles [14 years] earlier), Justin, and the village women depart for Harvest Home. Ned races ahead of them. The Corn Maiden removes her veil, revealing herself to actually be Beth. When Ned cries out in horror, the women capture him and are on the verge of killing him before they are stopped by the Widow, who forces him to watch as Beth and Justin (both drugged) copulate, symbolically uniting the Harvest Lord and the Corn Maiden to ensure a bountiful harvest. At the moment of Justin's climax, Tamar cuts his throat with a sickle. The women then collect and sprinkle his blood through the fields. Ned tries to escape but the women surround him and blind him, as they had done to Robert Dodd years earlier. Months later, Ned learns that Beth is pregnant and that Kate is to be the next Corn Maiden. Ned's family had been allowed to move to Cornwall Coombe because the village needed new blood, so to speak.

== Reception ==
A 1973 book review by Kirkus Reviews called the book "not only tethered to considerable earlier Americana but sometimes garroted by it—there's too much corn to husk before the last loaded third of the book." Stephen King critiqued his competitor's novel, writing in 1976 for The New York Times:

"It isn't a great book, not a great horror novel, not even a great suspense novel ... Never mind the best seller list. Mind this, instead: Sentence by sentence, paragraph by paragraph, it is a true book; it is an honest book in the sense that it says exactly what Tryon wanted to say. And if what he wanted to say wasn't exactly Miltonian, it does have this going for it: in forty years, when most of us are underground, there will still be a routine rebinding once a year for the library copies of Harvest Home".

== See also ==
- The White Goddess
- Eleusinian Mysteries
