= The Dark Secret of Harvest Home =

1978 American TV miniseries

- Original Television Advertisement
- Genre: Mystery; Horror; Folk horror Thriller
- Based on: Harvest Home by Tom Tryon
- Written by: Jack Guss; Charles E. Israel
- Directed by: Leo Penn
- Starring: Bette Davis; David Ackroyd; Joanna Miles; Rosanna Arquette
- Music by: Paul Chihara
- Country of origin: United States
- Original language: English

Production
- Producer: Jack Laird
- Cinematography: Charles Correll; Jim Dickson; Frank V. Phillips
- Editors: Robert F. Shugrue; Robert Watts
- Running time: 228 minutes (original airing)
- Production company: Universal Television

Original release
- Network: NBC
- Release: January 23 – January 24, 1978

The Dark Secret of Harvest Home is a 1978 American television horror-thriller miniseries, produced by Universal Television and directed by Leo Penn, that aired January 23–24, 1978, on NBC. The screenplay was based on the 1973 novel Harvest Home by Tom Tryon and is largely faithful to the original material.

== Synopsis ==
In the community of Cornwall Coombe, Connecticut, all the lives of the townspeople are devoted to tradition and "old ways", as directed by The Widow Fortune, an herbal healer and midwife, who rules the town with both folksy kindness and an iron hand. The villagers eschew modern agricultural methods and have extremely limited contact with the outside world. As one says, "we don't mess with other folks and we expect them not to mess with us." The villagers celebrate a number of festivals that revolve around the cultivation of corn. The most important festival is "Harvest Home", which takes place once every seven years.

Meanwhile in Manhattan, live the Constantines, Nick, Beth and their 15-year-old daughter, Kate, who comprise a family in crisis: Nick, an ad man, is unhappy with his life; Beth, a housewife, is neurotic, self-centered and obsessed with psychotherapy; and Kate is prone to sulking and terrible temper tantrums that trigger her chronic asthma.

When Beth's father dies, he leaves her very well-off, and in a desperate last attempt to save their marriage, the Constantines decide to leave New York and start afresh in the neighboring countryside; thus they arrive to Cornwall Coombe and, after being "chosen" by Widow Fortune, acquire a 200-year-old manse they start repairing, in order to move into it.

Nick befriends Robert Dodd, a former college professor, who is now blind and largely homebound. Like Nick, Robert was once an outsider who moved to Cornwall Coombe at the behest of his wife Maggie, who was born in the village. Nick also meets, among others, tall and handsome Justin Hooke, who serves as the current ceremonial "Harvest Lord"; Justin's wife, the demure and sweet-natured Sophie, his chosen "Corn Maiden" in the approaching "Corn Play"; and Worthy Pettinger, a young man whose dreams of going to agricultural college are frustrated by his parents, who hold to the old ways. On two separate occasion Kate suffers severe asthma attacks, and both times the Widow Fortune saves her life. She later prescribes home remedies which cure Kate entirely. Beth and Kate grow to adore the Widow, but Nick is suspicious of her herbal medicines and finds her unquestioned influence over the town troubling.

Meanwhile, Worthy is chosen as the next "Harvest Lord" who will replace Justin at the end of his seven years of service. Worthy does not wish to become the Harvest Lord, puzzling Nick, who understood the title to be an honor. Worthy, still hoping to attend college, has been saving money and hiding it in the barn, but his parents find and keep it. They confront him angrily about what they see as his selfish refusal to accept the honor he and his family have been given. On Tithing Day an angry Worthy bursts into the church service and shouts out a curse upon the corn before fleeing. The Widow announces that Worthy is henceforth "banished" and will be shunned by the village if he ever returns. Meanwhile, Worthy's parents and their goods are shunned because of their son's departure. Worthy begs Nick for help and he secretly provides Worthy with money to escape the village; Worthy promises to write to him. Nick begins to understand that the villagers, led by their women, practice pagan fertility rites to ensure their harvests. He becomes suspicious of the upcoming Harvest Home, but the most anyone will tell him is that it is "what no man may see nor woman tell". Meanwhile, Worthy's letter from Hartford to Nick (despite using a pseudonym) had been intercepted by the wicked and oversexed Tamar Penrose, the postmistress and a former Corn Maiden, who steams it open. It revealed Worthy's address. A posse was sent to kidnap and return him; he was later killed in the village. Nick is horrified to see Worthy's corpse being burnt in a massive bonfire on Kindling Night, where it had been callously tossed among the scarecrows.

On the day of Harvest Home, Justin's wife, Sophie, unexpectedly commits suicide, so a new Corn Maiden must be chosen. The Widow declares Nick an outcast and has him imprisoned in the village jail to keep him from interfering with Harvest Home. All the women then depart to choose another Corn Maiden. Nick does not eat any food, fearing it is drugged. He manages to escape and returns home to find his car missing and his phone dead. Nick goes to Robert Dodd for help, only to be told that on the night of Harvest Home, all the phones are disabled and all the cars confiscated until morning, while all the men are confined to their homes. Robert shockingly reveals that he himself was blinded, his eyeballs gouged out, for attempting to discover the secret of Harvest Home and begs Nick not to go out again. Fearing for his wife and daughter, Nick fatefully ignores the warning and returns to the village.

Nick arrives in time to see the heavily-veiled new Corn Maiden (whom he thinks is Tamar Penrose, who had been Corn Maiden two cycles [14 years] earlier), Justin, and the village women depart for Harvest Home. Nick chases them. The Corn Maiden removes her veil, revealing herself to actually be Beth. When Nick cries out in horror, the women capture him and are on the verge of killing him before they are stopped by the Widow, who forces him to watch as Beth and Justin (both drugged) copulate, symbolically uniting the Harvest Lord and the Corn Maiden to ensure a bountiful harvest. Afterwards, Beth cuts his throat with a sickle. The women then collect and sprinkle his blood through the fields. Nick tries to escape but he's betrayed by Kate, and the women surround him and blind him, as they had done to Robert Dodd years earlier, while the Widow cuts off his tongue with a pair of shears.

Six months later, Nick is a virtual prisoner in his own house; meanwhile Beth is pregnant and Kate is to be the next Corn Maiden. They patronize Nick with kindness, who is devoted to the traditions and ways of Cornwall Coombe, under the eye of the Widow.

== Cast ==
- Bette Davis as Widow Fortune
- David Ackroyd as Nick Constantine
- Joanna Miles as Beth Constantine
- Rosanna Arquette as Kate Constantine
- René Auberjonois as Jack Stump
- John Calvin as Justin Hooke
- Norman Lloyd as Amys Penrose
- Stephen Joyce as Robert Dodd
- Linda Marsh as Maggie Dodd
- Michael Durrell as Ty Barth
- Steve Gustafson as Jimmy Minerva
- Michael O'Keefe as Worthy Pettinger
- Grayce Grant as Mrs. Pettinger (Worthy's mother)
- Martin Shakar as David Adwell
- Laurie Prange as Sophie Hooke
- Lina Raymond as Tamar Penrose
- Tracey Gold as Missy Penrose
- Bill Balhatchet and Kathleen Howland as Fred and Asia Minerva

== Release ==
The miniseries originally aired on NBC in 1978, and reran in March 1979. It was also shown on TNT in two parts in 1992. It was later broadcast in a slightly truncated version, running just about 3 hours, on the Sci-Fi Channel in the mid-1990s. Many bootleg copies are taken from this source. The Dark Secret of Harvest Home has been released on VHS and DVD; this version is more heavily edited, running only 2 hours long.

The chapters to this series are:

- Part 1: Ploughing Day, Planting Day, Agnes Fair, Choosing The Young Lord, The Day Of Seasoning
- Part 2: Tithing Day, Sheaving Tide, Husking Bee, Corn Play, Kindling Night, Harvest Home
