= Tom Tryon =

American actor and novelist (1926–1991)

- Tryon in 1972
- Born: Thomas Lester Tryon; January 14, 1926; Hartford, Connecticut, U.S.
- Died: September 4, 1991 (aged 65); Los Angeles, California
- Occupations: Actor; novelist
- Years active: 1955–1991
- Spouse: Ann Noyes (m. 1955; div. 1958)
- Partners: Clive Clerk (1970–1972); Casey Donovan (1973–1977)

Thomas Lester Tryon (January 14, 1926 – September 4, 1991) was an American actor and novelist. As an actor, he was billed as Tom Tryon and is best known for playing the title role in the film The Cardinal (1963), featured roles in the war films The Longest Day (1962) and In Harm's Way (1965), acting with John Wayne in both movies, and especially the Walt Disney television character Texas John Slaughter (1958–1961). Tryon later turned to the writing of prose fiction and screenplays, and wrote several successful science fiction, horror and mystery novels as Thomas Tryon.

== Early life and education ==
Thomas Tryon was born on January 14, 1926, in Hartford, Connecticut, the son of Arthur Lane Tryon, a clothier, and Elizabeth Tryon. An ancestor was William Tryon, a colonial Governor of New York. and owner of Stackpole, Moore & Tryon (he is often erroneously identified as the son of silent screen actor Glenn Tryon). He served in the United States Navy in the Pacific from 1943 to 1946 during and after World War II. Tryon graduated from Yale University with a degree in fine arts.

== Acting career ==
Tryon began his acting career appearing on stage in Wish You Were Here (1952), Cyrano de Bergerac (1953), and Richard III (1953).

He next found work in TV, appearing in The Way of the World (1955) with Gloria Lewis, Leora Thatcher, and Sydney Smith. He also guest-starred in 1955 as Antoine De Mores in the two-part episode "King of the Dakotas" of NBC's western anthology series Frontier.

Tryon was signed to a long-term contract to Paramount in 1955. His film debut was in The Scarlet Hour (1956) at Paramount, directed by Michael Curtiz, a crime drama about a man whose married lover persuades him to commit a robbery; Tryon received second billing. He was top billed in a low budget war film at Allied Artists, Screaming Eagles (1956), then supported Charlton Heston and Anne Baxter in Three Violent People (1956) at Paramount. He was announced for, but did not end up appearing in, Short Cut to Hell. He had a support role in RKO's The Unholy Wife (1957) billed after Rod Steiger and Diana Dors. He had the lead in a low budget science fiction film at Paramount, I Married a Monster from Outer Space (1958).

Tryon's work was mostly in TV, appearing in numerous roles such as Jane Wyman Presents The Fireside Theatre, The 20th Century-Fox Hour, Playhouse 90 (an adaptation of Charley's Aunt), Zane Grey Theater, Studio 57, Matinee Theatre, and Lux Video Theatre, The Restless Gun with John Payne, General Electric Theater, The Millionaire, and The Big Valley, (American Western series originally aired from 1964 to 1969) that he was a guest star in the 1966 episode "The Midas Man". Tryon appeared in the lead in "The Mark Hanford Story" (February 26, 1958) on NBC's Wagon Train with Onslow Stevens and Kathleen Crowley.

Tryon played Texas John Slaughter in a series of TV movies for Disney which ran from 1958 to 1961. The role was based on actual historical figure John Slaughter. He was considered but eventually passed over for the role of Janet Leigh's lover, Sam Loomis, in the classic thriller Psycho (1960); the role went to John Gavin.

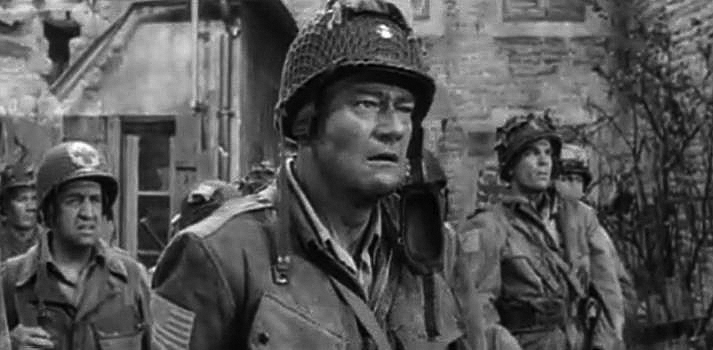
Tryon is on the right behind John Wayne, from the movie The Longest Day

Tryon starred in The Story of Ruth (1960) at 20th Century Fox. For that studio he appeared in Marines, Let's Go (1961). Disney borrowed him to star in a satire about the space age, Moon Pilot (1962). He was one of many names in The Longest Day (1962) at Fox. In 1962, Tryon was cast to play the role of Stephen Burkett ("Adam") in the unfinished Marilyn Monroe-Dean Martin comedy film, Something's Got to Give, directed by George Cukor, but lost that role after Monroe was fired from the movie; the picture was remade with Doris Day and James Garner as Move Over, Darling (1963) with Chuck Connors playing Tryon's part. Tryon guest starred on Dr. Kildare and The Virginian.

Tryon's greatest role was as an ambitious Catholic priest in The Cardinal (1963). The film was a box office hit and Tryon received a nomination for a Golden Globe Award for Best Actor – Motion Picture Drama. He did not enjoy making the film, saying in 1986, "Finally, I was in a position of being able to pick my roles. But I didn't like the movie. I didn't like me in the movie. To this day, I cannot look at that film. It's because of Preminger. He was a tyrant who ruled by terror. He tied me up in knots. He screamed at me. He called me names. He said I was lazy. He said I was a fool. He never cursed me. His insults were far more personal."

Tryon later guest-starred on Kraft Suspense Theatre and then was reunited with Preminger in In Harm's Way (1965) starring John Wayne and Kirk Douglas. One of his final film roles was in The Glory Guys (1965) with Senta Berger and James Caan.

== Later career ==
Tryon was part of a live television performance of The Fall of the House of Usher. He also co-wrote a song, "I Wish I Was", which appeared on an obscure record by Dick Kallman, star of the short-lived 1965 television sitcom Hank. Other television roles include episodes of The Big Valley, Bob Hope Presents the Chrysler Theatre, and the 1967 TV movie remake Winchester '73 in which Tryon played James Stewart's original role with a supporting cast featuring Dan Duryea, John Drew Barrymore, Joan Blondell, John Dehner and Paul Fix. Tryon went to Australia for his final screen performance as the lead in Color Me Dead (1969), a remake of the noir classic D.O.A. (1950), which had slipped into public domain.

== Writing career ==
Disillusioned with acting, Tryon retired from the profession in 1969 and began writing horror and mystery novels. He also moved into film financing, serving as executive producer of Dalton Trumbo's Johnny Got His Gun (1971).

His best-known work is The Other (1971), about a boy whose evil twin brother may or may not be responsible for a series of deaths in a small rural community in the 1930s. The Other was highly successful, spending over 6 months on the New York Times best-seller list and selling more than 3.5 million copies. He adapted his novel into a film released the following year that starred Diana Muldaur, Uta Hagen, and John Ritter. He followed this with Harvest Home (1973), about the dark pagan rituals being practiced in a small New England town. It was adapted as The Dark Secret of Harvest Home (1978), a television miniseries starring Bette Davis. This too spent several months on the Times best-seller list. It was highlighted in the October 21, 1973, edition as a top fiction title.

Tryon's other books include Crowned Heads, a collection of novellas inspired by the legends of Hollywood. Tryon sold the film rights to Universal to make four films based on the novellas. The first of these novellas, Fedora, about a reclusive former film actress whose relationship with her plastic surgeon is similar to that between a drug addict and her pusher, was later converted to a feature film directed by Billy Wilder.

Other novellas in the collection were based on the murder of former silent screen star Ramón Novarro and on the complicated relationship between actor Clifton Webb and his mother. Lady (1974) concerns the friendship between an eight-year-old boy and a charming widow in 1930s New England and the secret he discovers about her. His novel The Night of the Moonbow (1989) tells the story of a boy driven to violent means by the constant harassment he receives at summer camp. Night Magic, written in 1991, was posthumously published in 1995.

Tryon said "I found that the real reward was the writing itself, working at it day by day and finally accomplishing something -- that was it. To have a book published is one of the most exciting things that can happen to you. Infinitely more rewarding than acting".

== Personal life ==
In 1955, Tryon married Ann L. Noyes, the daughter of stockbroker Joseph Leo Lilienthal and his wife, the former Edna Arnstein. She was the former wife of Thomas Ewing Noyes, with whom she had been a theatrical producer. The Tryons divorced in 1958. Ann died in 1966; Tryon said that she committed suicide and that he kept a photograph of her in his apartment.

During the 1970s, he was in a romantic relationship with Clive Clerk, one of the original cast members of A Chorus Line and an interior designer who decorated Tryon's apartment on Central Park West in New York City, which was featured in Architectural Digest. From 1973 to 1977, Tryon was in a relationship with porn actor Casey Donovan.

== Death ==
Tryon died on September 4, 1991, at the age of 65 in Los Angeles. The announced cause of death was stomach cancer. Tryon's literary executor, C. Thomas Holloway, later stated Tryon's illness was related to his HIV-positive status. Tryon asked to keep this information private. When Tryon's lover Clive Clerk explained, "Tom didn't want his readers or his relatives to know," Holloway disapproved, writing, "I see it as Tom's selfish silence helped the Dark Ages [of public acceptance of HIV/AIDS] continue into the millennium."

== Filmography ==
=== Film ===
Year	Title	Role	Notes
1956	The Scarlet Hour	E.V. "Marsh" Marshall	
1956	Screaming Eagles	Pvt. Mason	
1956	Three Violent People	Beauregard "Cinch" Saunders	
1957	The Unholy Wife	San Sanders	
1958	I Married a Monster from Outer Space	Bill Farrell	
1960	The Story of Ruth	Mahlon	
1961	Gundown at Sandoval	Texas John Slaughter	
1961	Marines, Let's Go	Pfc. Skip Roth	
1962	Moon Pilot	Capt. Richmond Talbot	
1962	The Longest Day	Lt. Wilson	
1962	Something's Got to Give	Stephen Burkett	Unfinished film
1963	The Cardinal	Stephen Fermoyle	Nominated — Golden Globe Award for Best Actor – Motion Picture Drama; Nominated – Laurel Award for Top Male Dramatic Performance (5th place)
1965	In Harm's Way	Mac	
1965	The Glory Guys	Capt. Demas Harrod	
1968	Persecución hasta Valencia	Harry Bell	
1969	Color Me Dead	Frank Bigelow	
1971	Johnny Got His Gun	—N/a	Executive producer, final film role (uncredited)
1972	The Other	—N/a	Writer and executive producer, based on his novel
1978	Fedora	—N/a	Based on his novella "Fedora"

=== Television ===
Year	Title	Role	Notes
1955	The Way of the World	—N/a	Episode dated March 28, 1955
1955–1957	Matinee Theater	Various roles	8 episodes
1955	Frontier	Antoine De More	Episodes: "King of the Dakotas: Parts 1 & 2"
1956–1957	Fireside Theatre	Various roles	3 episodes
1957	The 20th Century Fox Hour	Abe Lincoln	Episode: "Springfield Incident"
1957	Playhouse 90	Charley Wyckham	Episode: "Where's Charley?"
1957	Zane Grey Theatre	Jeff Anderson	Episode: "Black Is for Grief"
1957	Lux Video Theatre	Sam	Episode: "Design for November"
1958	Wagon Train	Mark Hanford	Episode: "The Mark Hanford Story"
1958	The Restless Gun	Sheriff Bill Riddle	Episode: "Sheriff Billy"
1958	General Electric Theater	David	Episode: "Strange Witness"
1958	The Millionaire	Tony Drummond	Episode: "The Tony Drummond Story"
1958–1961	Disneyland	Texas John Slaughter	17 episodes
1959	The Joseph Cotten Show—On Trial	David	Episode: "Strange Witness"
1962–1970	The Virginian	Various roles	4 episodes
1963	Dr. Kildare	Dr. William Ellis	Episode: "The Mosaic"
1965	Kraft Suspense Theatre	Tom Banning	Episode: "Nobody Will Ever Know"
1965–1967	Bob Hope Presents the Chrysler Theatre	Various roles	2 episodes
1966	The Big Valley	Scott Breckenridge	Episode: "The Midas Man"
1967	Winchester 73	Lin McAdam	Television film
1967	The Road West	Sheriff Platt	Episode: "Charade of Justice"
1978	The Dark Secret of Harvest Home	—N/a	Mini-series adaptation of his novel Harvest Home

== Published works ==
=== Novels ===
- The Other (Knopf, 1971) ISBN 9780394436081
- Harvest Home (Knopf, 1973) ISBN 9780394485287
- Lady (Knopf, 1974) ISBN 9780394490939
- The Night of the Moonbow (Knopf, 1989) ISBN 9780394560069
- The Wings of the Morning (Knopf, 1990) ISBN 9780394523897
- In the Fire of Spring (Knopf, 1992) ISBN 9780394585888
- The Adventures of Opal and Cupid (Viking Press, 1992) ISBN 9780670822393
- Night Magic (Simon & Schuster, 1995) ISBN 9780684803937

=== Collections ===
- Crowned Heads (Knopf, 1976) ISBN 9780394404684
- All That Glitters (Knopf, 1986) ISBN 9780394550237

=== Short stories and novellas (collected in Crowned Heads) ===
- Bobbitt (1976)
- Fedora (1976)
- Lorna (1976)
- Willie (1976)
- Salad Days (1976)

=== Short stories and novellas (collected in All That Glitters) ===
- Babe (1986)
- Belinda (1986)
- April (1986)
- Maude (1986)
- Claire (1986)
