= Eskimo Nell (film) =

1975 British film by Martin Campbell

- Directed by: Martin Campbell
- Screenplay by: Michael Armstrong
- Story by: Stanley Long
- Based on: "The Ballad of Eskimo Nell"
- Produced by: Stanley Long
- Starring: Roy Kinnear; Anna Quayle; Katy Manning; Christopher Timothy; Michael Armstrong; Terence Edmond; Rosalind Knight; Diane Langton; Richard Caldicot; Christopher Biggins
- Cinematography: Peter Hannan (credited as Peter Hannon)
- Music by: Simon Park
- Production company: Salon Productions
- Distributed by: Eagle Films
- Release date: 17 January 1975
- Running time: 85 minutes
- Country: United Kingdom
- Language: English

Eskimo Nell (also known as The Ballad of Eskimo Nell and The Sexy Saga of Naughty Nell and Big Dick), is a 1975 British satirical comedy film directed by Martin Campbell and starring Roy Kinnear, Anna Quayle, Katy Manning, and Christopher Timothy. It was produced by Stanley Long, who was mainly known for his sexploitation films. Though inspired by "The Ballad of Eskimo Nell", the film owes little to the original bawdy song and features little nudity, instead following a metafictional narrative about the various attempts to produce a movie based on "Eskimo Nell".

Long called it "my definitive statement about the sex films", maintaining it was drawn from his own experiences working in the British film industry. Several characters in the film are based on real industry figures.

== Plot ==
Budding film director Dennis Morrison, producer Clive Potter, and screenwriter Harris Tweedle are hired by seedy erotic film producer Benny U. Murdoch to make a sexy movie based on the poem "The Ballad of Eskimo Nell". However, they run into difficulty when each of the production's backers want a completely different style of film made. Then, Murdoch makes off with the money, and the three have to produce four different versions of the movie to keep everybody happy – a gay Western, a hardcore porno, a Kung Fu-style musical, and a wholesome family production.

== Cast ==
- Roy Kinnear as Benny U. Murdoch
- Anna Quayle as Reverend Mother
- Katy Manning as Hermione
- Christopher Timothy as Harris Tweedle
- Michael Armstrong as Dennis Morrison
- Terence Edmond as Clive Potter
- Rosalind Knight as Lady Hermione Longhorn
- Diane Langton as Gladys Armitage
- Richard Caldicot as Ambrose Cream
- Beth Porter as Billie Harris
- Christopher Biggins as Jeremy
- Gordon Tanner as Big Dick
- Jonathan Adams as Lord Coltwind
- Lloyd Lamble as The Bishop
- Christopher Neil as Brendan
- Nicholas Young as Deadeye Dick
- Stephanie Cole as traffic warden (uncredited)
- Mary Millington as stripping traffic warden (uncredited)

== Background ==
Many of the film's characters are based on real personalities of the time. Lady Longhorn and Lord Coltwind — the backers of the wholesome family version — are thinly veiled caricatures of Mary Whitehouse and Lord Longford. Benny U. Murdoch is loosely based on Tony Tenser, head of Tigon films. A more obscure figure the film ridicules is Louis "Deke" M. Heyward, the London representative of AIP (American International Pictures), who had previously clashed with the film's writer Michael Armstrong in 1969 during the making of Armstrong's directing debut, The Haunted House of Horror (1969). In Eskimo Nell Heyward is parodied as "Big Dick", a crass, foul-mouthed American producer from "A.W.P Films", and the backer of the hardcore porno version. A similar character had previously appeared in Armstrong's script for The Sex Thief (1973).

Mary Millington has a small role in the film as a stripping traffic warden who auditions for a part in the film within a film. Although Millington appears only fleetingly (with her audition sped up for comic effect), stills from her scene were used to publicize the film in magazines including Titbits and Cinema X.

The film is not to be confused with Richard Franklin's 1975 film The True Story of Eskimo Nell which was released in the UK as Dick Down Under. Campbell's film was re-titled The Sexy Saga of Naughty Nell and Big Dick in Australia.

Long half financed with Barry Jacobs' Eagle films. Long had directed by then, but commissioned Martin Campbell write and direct. Long says the film is loosely based on fact and real people who were in the film industry.

== Critical reception ==
The Monthly Film Bulletin wrote:

On the face of it, just another cheap, fall-on-your-farce sexploitation comedy, stamped with the familiar British hallmarks of vulgarity, unsubtlety and mistimed slapstick. What distinguishes Eskimo Nell from others of its kind, however, is the ungentlemanly relish with which the entire cast and production crew attack the film's central targets – namely, the very system which sponsors cheap sexploitation comedies, and the philistines who beget them. Clearly there are some painful old scores to be settled in Wardour Street. Indeed, Roy Kinnear's lecherous mini-mogul, who sees movies in exclusively anatomical terms ("Look at those big charismas!"), is taken almost libellously from life, and there are other caricatures of Soho entrepreneurs sharp-edged enough to suggest that any resemblance to living persons is not entirely coincidental. Michael Armstrong's hit-and-miss script has, at its best, an equally authentic, fly-on-the-wall quality, and manages to steer clear of the more obvious plot clichés ... Inevitably, the in-jokes are over-indulged (forgivably so in the case of Beth Porter's remarkable imitation of Judy Holliday), but the film's infectious air of gleeful vengeance and genuine satirical bite give it, against all the odds, a rare claim as a British comedy of the Seventies that is both funny and relevant.

== Home media ==
Eskimo Nell was released in a 'special edition' DVD and Blu-ray on 16 February 2015, to celebrate its 40th anniversary (the film was originally released in London in January 1975). The new edition has been digitally re-mastered at Pinewood Studios and comes with several extra features including the original theatrical trailer (unseen since 1975), an audio commentary by the film's actor-writer Michael Armstrong and film historian Simon Sheridan, an 8-page booklet, plus an extensive stills gallery and a newly re-mastered version of Mary Millington's short 1974 film Wild Lovers.
