= Tigon British Film Productions =

British film company

Opening logo

Tigon British Film Productions or Tigon was a film production and distribution company, founded by Tony Tenser in 1966.

It is best remembered for its horror films, particularly Witchfinder General (directed by Michael Reeves, 1968) and The Blood on Satan's Claw (directed by Piers Haggard, 1971). Other Tigon films include The Sorcerers (1967), The Haunted House of Horror (1969) and Doomwatch (1972), based on the TV series of the same name. As the name of the company implies, a tigon appears in the logo.

== History ==
Tigon was based at Hammer House in Wardour Street, London, and released a wide range of films from sexploitation (Zeta One), to an acclaimed television adaptation of August Strindberg's Miss Julie (1972) starring Helen Mirren. The largest part of its output, however, was made up by low-budget horror films in direct competition for audiences with Hammer Film Productions and Amicus Productions.

In February 2005, a region 2 DVD box set of Tigon films was released by Anchor Bay in the UK. The box set contains Witchfinder General, The Body Stealers, The Haunted House of Horror, The Blood on Satan's Claw, The Beast in the Cellar, and Virgin Witch. Providing an audio commentary on a number of the films, as well as writing the productions notes, was the author and film critic John Hamilton.

The same year, FAB press in the UK published John Hamilton's biography of Tony Tenser, a comprehensive look at the career of Tigon's founder and the man dubbed "the Godfather of British Exploitation". Hamilton had access to production files, diaries and personal correspondence, as well as recording a number of exclusive interviews with the likes of Vernon Sewell, Michael Armstrong, Christopher Lee, Ian Ogilvy and Peter Sasdy. He also recorded over 18 hours of interviews with Tony Tenser himself, all of which went to create an in-depth look not only at the making of the films but the machinations involved with running a film company. The book was critically acclaimed in a number of newspapers and magazines, including The New York Times and The Independent, as well as Film Review and SPFX (the latter dubbed it the "best single volume history ever written on British horror").

Hamilton has gone on to write a number of articles on Tigon film productions, published in magazines like The Darkside, Shivers and Little Shoppe of Horrors; in 2015, Hemlock Books published Tigon: Blood on a Budget, the author's look at the studio's horror and fantasy movies.

== Filmography ==
=== As production company ===
- Mini Weekend (1967)
- The Sorcerers (1967)
- The Blood Beast Terror (1968)
- Witchfinder General (1968)
- Love in Our Time (1968)
- Curse of the Crimson Altar (1968)
- The Body Stealers (1969)
- What's Good for the Goose (1969)
- The Haunted House of Horror (1969)
- 1917 (1970)
- Monique (1970)
- Zeta One (1970)
- Black Beauty (1971)
- The Beast in the Cellar (1971)
- The Blood on Satan's Claw (1971)
- Hannie Caulder (1971)
- The Magnificent Seven Deadly Sins (1971)
- Virgin Witch (1972)
- Doomwatch (1972)
- For the Love of Ada (1972)
- Neither the Sea Nor the Sand (1972)

=== As distributor ===
- Castle of the Living Dead (1964 – UK release 1968)
- Terror-Creatures from the Grave (1965 – UK release 1968)
- Sandy the Seal (1965 – released 1969)
- Snow Treasure (1968)
- O.K. Yevtushenko (1968 – released 1975)
- Love Variations (1969)
- Simon, Simon (1970)
- Permissive (1970)
- Clegg (1970)
- The Nude Vampire (1970)
- Stork (1971)
- Miss Julie (1972) (TV movie)
- Wrong Way (1972 – released 1981)
- Sex, Love and Marriage (1972)
- The Fiend (1972)
- Au Pair Girls (1972)
- The Flesh and Blood Show (1972)
- Blood Brides (1973)
- The Creeping Flesh (1973)
- The Sex Thief (1973)
- A Candle for the Devil (1973)
- Murder Inferno (1973)
- The Great McGonagall (1974)
- Double Agent 73 (1974)
- All I Want Is You... and You... and You... (1974)
- Sizzlers (1976)
- Intimate Games (1976)
- Erotic Confessions (1976 – released 1981)
- The Red Nights of the Gestapo (1977)
- Come Play With Me (1977)
- Tänzerinnen für Tanger (1977)
- The Playbirds (1978)
- The Violation of the Bitch (1978)
- Confessions from the David Galaxy Affair (1979)
- Queen of the Blues (1979)
- The Ecstasy Girls (1979)
- Sex with the Stars (1980)
- Come Play with Me 2 (1980)
- Rude Boy (1980)
- Emanuelle: Queen Bitch (1980)
- Hotel Paradise (1980)
- Mary Millington's World Striptease Extravaganza (1981)
- Emmanuelle in Soho (1981)
- Ring of Desire (1981)
- Electric Blue – The Movie (1982)
- Hellcat Mud Wrestlers (1983)
