= Curse of the Crimson Altar =

1968 British film by Vernon Sewell

- Theatrical release poster
- Directed by: Vernon Sewell
- Screenplay by: Mervyn Haisman; Henry Lincoln
- Story by: Jerry Sohl
- Based on: "The Dreams in the Witch House" by H. P. Lovecraft (uncredited)
- Produced by: Louis M. Heyward
- Starring: Boris Karloff; Christopher Lee; Mark Eden; Barbara Steele; Michael Gough; Rupert Davies; Virginia Wetherell
- Cinematography: John Coquillon
- Edited by: Howard Lanning
- Music by: Peter Knight
- Production company: Tigon British Film Productions
- Distributed by: American International Pictures
- Release dates: December 1968 (UK); 15 April 1970 (USA)
- Running time: 89 minutes
- Country: United Kingdom
- Language: English

Curse of the Crimson Altar (also called The Crimson Altar; released in the United States as The Crimson Cult) is a 1968 British horror film directed by Vernon Sewell and starring Christopher Lee, Boris Karloff, Barbara Steele, Virginia Wetherell and Mark Eden. The film was produced by Louis M. Heyward for Tigon British Film Productions. The screenplay, by Doctor Who writers Mervyn Haisman and Henry Lincoln, was based loosely (uncredited) on the short story "The Dreams in the Witch House" by H. P. Lovecraft. This film also featured the final British film appearance of Karloff.

== Plot ==
Antiques dealer Robert Manning searches for his brother, who was last known to have visited the remote house of Craxted Lodge at Greymarsh, their family's ancestral town. Arriving at night, he finds a party is in progress, and he is invited to stay by Eve, the niece of the owner of the house. His sleep is restless and strange dreams of ritual sacrifice disturb him. Enquiring about his brother, Peter, he is assured by the house owner, Morley, that the man is not there. Manning's suspicions are aroused by nightmarish hallucinations. Occult expert Professor Marsh informs Manning about a witchcraft cult led by Morley's ancestor, Lavinia. With the vicar's help the cult is discovered to still be active. In an effort to kill Robert and Eve (a descendant of Lavinia), Morley, the secret co-head of the cult, sets fire to Craxted Lodge. He and Lavinia are trapped on the roof. As Lavinia laughs at the bystanders, she and Morley are consumed in the flames.

== Cast ==
- Christopher Lee as Morley
- Boris Karloff as Professor John Marsh
- Mark Eden as Robert Manning
- Barbara Steele as Lavinia Morley
- Michael Gough as Elder
- Rupert Davies as The Vicar
- Virginia Wetherell as Eve Morley
- Rosemarie Reede as Esther
- Derek Tansley as Judge
- Michael Warren as Chauffeur
- Ron Pember as Petrol Attendant
- Denys Peek as Peter Manning

== Production ==
The house used for Craxted Lodge is Grim's Dyke, the allegedly haunted former home of William S. Gilbert, located in Old Redding, Harrow Weald, Middlesex, London. The building, which is now a hotel, was used for both exterior and interior shots. The interiors were in a state of disrepair and needed an extensive refit. Shooting in the middle of winter meant that additional fan heaters had to be installed to keep the temperature in the dressing rooms tolerable for the actors. Christopher Lee reported that, despite Tigon’s best efforts, he spent the whole picture shivering from cold.

Boris Karloff, who was over eighty and in poor health, was required for two night shoots, filmed at the very end of his involvement. The actor contracted a mild cold, according to producer Tony Tenser, and as a precaution spent several days in a private clinic under observation. He was then given a clean bill of health and travelled to Hollywood to make four more films back-to-back. Tigon were so nervous that the film would be billed as "the film that killed Boris Karloff" that they released a quote from the actor saying he contracted bronchitis not in England, but in Hollywood.

Vernon Sewell said the producer offered him a story 'The Dreams in the Witch House' and "I said, "Yes, that's fun, I'll do that." We were going to shoot the whole thing in Gilbert (of Gilbert and Sullivan)'s old house called Grim's Dyke Hall. No studio, it was all done there...We altered the inside, we put up new – built new rooms and things. But I enjoyed that, very funny." Sewell says a week before filming he was told Boris Karloff was uninsurable so they decided to recast with Christopher Lee. Then he was told they had to pay Karloff regardless, so they needed to use him. "So here we were now, I've got Boris Karloff, who was a star so we had to re-write the entire script and Boris Karloff is the good man [laughs] and Christopher Lee is the bad man!" said Sewell. "But I enjoyed it, I got a lot of fun with that."

== Release ==
The film opened in the United Kingdom in December 1968. It opened in the United States on April 15, 1970 on a double bill with Horror House (1969) at the Fox Theatre in St. Louis and at the Michigan Theatre in Detroit where it grossed a combined $18,000 in the first week. It went into general release across the United States on Nov. 11, 1970, on a double bill with Count Yorga, Vampire (1970). The US release was an edited version of the original.

== Critical reception ==
Roger Greenspun of The New York Times wrote, "Karloff himself, cadaverous and almost wholly crippled, acts with a quiet lucidity of such great beauty that it is a refreshment merely to hear him speak old claptrap. Nothing else in The Crimson Cult comes close to him – though there is Barbara Steele in greenface playing Lavinia, a glamorous 300-year-old and a monumental cast that lists no fewer than seven-party girls, plus several sacrificial virgins."

Variety wrote that as one of Karloff's final pictures, "it would have been nice if it had been a better role. As it is, it is a totally unabashed rehash of a formula that Karloff has been identified with through the years."

Kevin Thomas of the Los Angeles Times called the film "a delight for horror fans, with Karloff in top form despite the infirmities of age."

The Monthly Film Bulletin wrote that apart from a wild party and some exposure of a woman's bosom in a bed, "this is one of the lamest and tamest horrors in a long time, with the script hobbling along like an underprivileged Agatha Christie thriller through acres of would-be sinister dialogue as the handsome hero investigates endlessly and Karloff and Christopher Lee dispense meaningful sneers."

The Radio Times Guide to Films gave the film 2/5 stars, writing: "With a title like this you'd expect sacrifices galore, but none was as great as that made by its star, Boris Karloff. The horror legend makes one of his final screen appearances in this lacklustre offering about devil worship in an old dark house."
