= The Outcasts (1982 film) =

- Poster for The Outcasts
- Directed by: Robert Wynne-Simmons
- Written by: Robert Wynne-Simmons
- Produced by: Tony Dollard
- Starring: Mary Ryan, Mick Lally, Cyril Cusack
- Cinematography: Seamus Corcoran
- Edited by: Arthur Keating
- Music by: Stephen Cooney
- Production company: Tolmayax
- Release date: 1982
- Running time: 95 minutes
- Country: Ireland
- Language: English

The Outcasts, written and directed by Robert Wynne-Simmons and starring Mary Ryan and Mick Lally, is an Irish film completed in 1982 and broadcast in 1984 as part of UK's Channel 4 Film on Four series. It was the first Irish feature film in 50 years, and as such started the revival of the Irish film industry.

== Description ==
This 95-minute feature film was written and directed in 1982 by Robert Wynne-Simmons, starring Mary Ryan as Maura and Mick Lally as Scarf Michael. Camerawork is by Seamus Corcoran and music by Steve Cooney. Because it was the first major movie to be funded in Ireland for half a century, it was given credit for initiating the revival of the Cinema of Ireland. This project by the film company Tolmayax was nearly prematurely ended in December 1981 when the film location became inaccessible due to snow 14 feet deep. Filming started again in February 1982, funded by the Arts Council of Ireland and the Irish Film Board. It was bought by Channel Four Television Corporation for its Film on Four series and first transmitted in 1984. It was the only feature film produced by Tolmayax. The film has not been released on DVD, however it was released on VHS in 1983. A restored print was released on Blu-ray by the BFI in 2024. This dreamlike film does not precisely fit any genre, except perhaps fantasy.

== Plot ==
The plot is based on Irish mythology and history and is set in Ireland in the first half of the 19th century, before the Great Famine which began in 1845. Influences include The Book of Thel by William Blake, and poetry by W. B. Yeats. Maura is an apparently backward girl who is awakened by an outcast fairy, fiddler and shaman known as 'Scarf Michael'. He becomes her lover and teacher.

== Awards ==
The Outcasts appeared at film festivals worldwide, and won the following awards. It got Best Film and Critics Prize at Brussels International Fantastic Film Festival, and Best First Feature and Best Actress at the San Remo Film Festival. It had Special Prize for Originality and Jury Prize at Oporto Film Festival 1984, and Prix du Publique at Geneva Film Festival. It has the Arts Council of Ireland Award.
