= The Image (1969 film) =

- Frame from the film
- Directed by: Michael Armstrong
- Written by: Michael Armstrong
- Produced by: Olive Negus-Fancey
- Starring: David Bowie; Michael Byrne
- Cinematography: Ousama Rawi
- Edited by: Julian Hindson
- Music by: Noel Janus
- Distributed by: Border Film Productions
- Release date: 28 January 1969
- Running time: 14 minutes
- Country: United Kingdom
- Language: English

The Image is a 1969 British black and white short film directed and written by Michael Armstrong, starring Michael Byrne and David Bowie in his first film role. It was produced by Oliver Negus-Fancey.

The summary on the cover of the film's script reads: "a study of the illusionary reality world within the schizophrenic mind of the artist at his point of creativity".

The film was classified 'X' by the British Board of Film Classification.

== Plot ==
A troubled artist is finishing his portrait of a young man, who suddenly appears outside the window and enters the house. The artist tries to kill the young man, first by strangling and then by stabbing, but each time he comes back to life. In despair, the artist falls onto his painting.

== Cast ==
- David Bowie as the boy
- Michael Byrne as the artist
