= Michael Armstrong (filmmaker) =

English writer and director (born 1944)

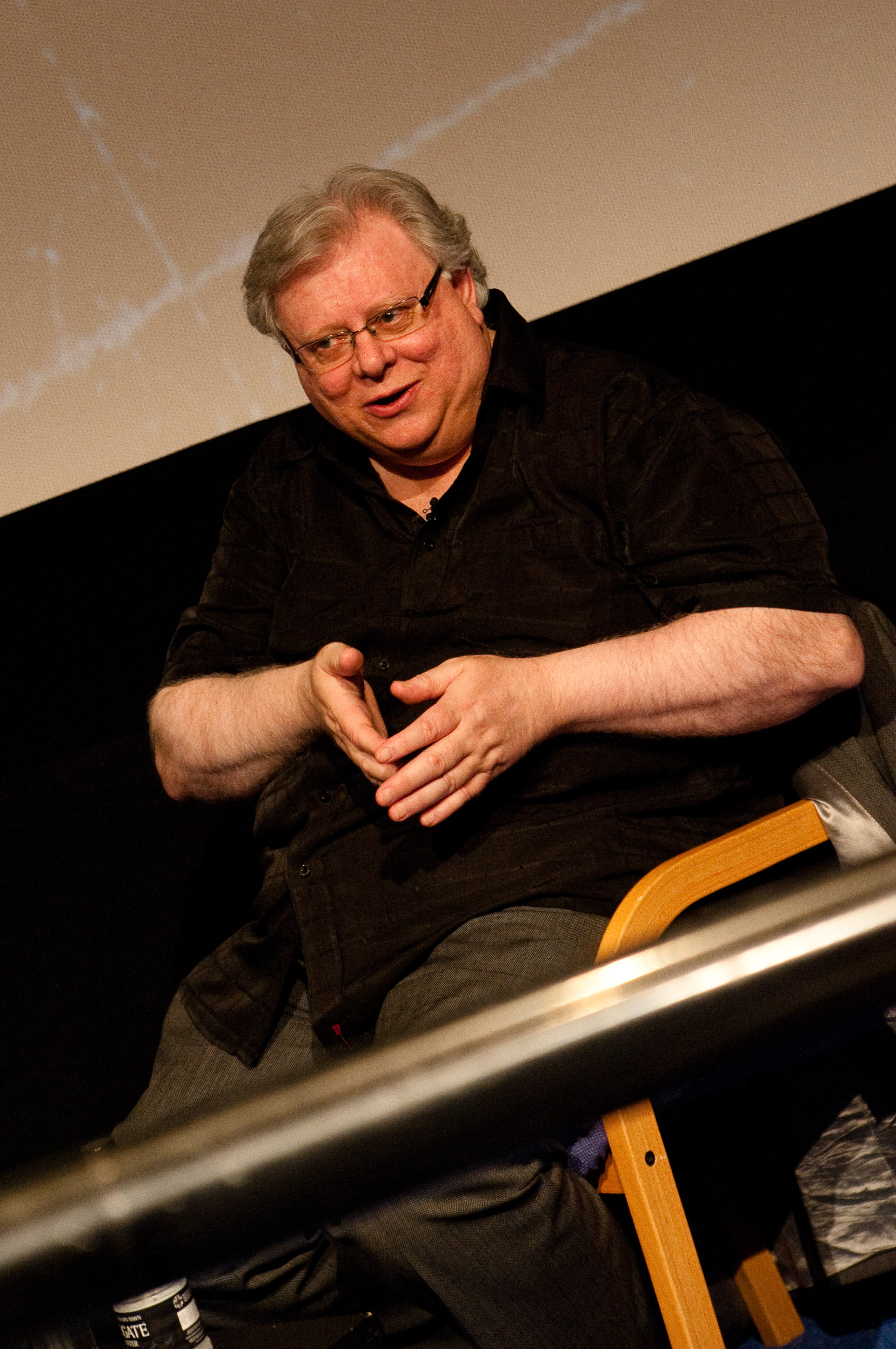
- Michael Armstrong at the Fantastic Films Weekend in Bradford, England
- Born: 24 July 1944 (age 80); Bolton, Lancashire, England
- Other names: Al Beresford, Sergio Casstner, Edward Hyde
- Occupation(s): Writer, director

Michael Armstrong (born 24 July 1944 in Bolton, Lancashire) is an English writer and director.

Armstrong trained at the Royal Academy of Dramatic Art and was writing and directing films at the age of 22 with the award-winning short, The Image starring David Bowie and Michael Byrne. The following year, he wrote and directed his first feature film, The Haunted House of Horror, starring Frankie Avalon, Jill Haworth, Mark Wynter, Richard O'Sullivan and Dennis Price, following it with the notorious Mark of the Devil, starring Herbert Lom and Udo Kier which exceeded box office expectations in Europe and America on its first release in 1970 and has grown to be considered a cult film.

Since then, Armstrong's film credits have included the highly successful sex comedies The Sex Thief (1973) and Eskimo Nell (1975), both of which featured Armstrong himself, Adventures of a Private Eye (1977), and House of the Long Shadows (1983) starring Vincent Price, Christopher Lee, Peter Cushing and John Carradine. In all he has written and/or directed seventeen feature films internationally, for which he has won numerous awards.

His television credits include The Professionals, Shoestring and Return of the Saint. His theatre work includes, in Los Angeles, writing and directing a new musical, My Jewish Vampire, and in the UK, a specially conceived work for actors and orchestra for a royal charity performance at the Royal Albert Hall, The Enchanted Orchestra featuring the London Symphony Orchestra and an all-star cast of fifteen actors including the legendary Max Wall and headed by Sir John Mills. He has also produced and directed plays both on tour and in London's West End, taught and directed, periodically, at various drama schools, created a unique "structured Acting Course", published the magazine The Grapevine and worked as a film critic for Films & Filming.

In 2014 he was due to direct a new film, Orphanage, based on a script he wrote in the early 1980s, but the movie was never made.

== Filmography ==
- The Image (1969) – short film
- The Haunted House of Horror (1969)
- Mark of the Devil (1970)
- The Sex Thief (1973)
- Eskimo Nell (1975)
- It Could Happen to You (1975)
- Adventures of a Private Eye (1977)
- The Black Panther (1977)
- House of the Long Shadows (1983)
- Screamtime (1983)

== Trivia ==
- Armstrong has also used the pseudonyms Al Beresford, Sergio Casstner and Edward Hyde.
