= Mark of the Devil (1970 film) =

1970 West German horror film by Michael Armstrong

- German: Hexen bis aufs Blut gequält
- Literally: Witches Tortured Till They Bleed
- Directed by: Michael Armstrong
- Screenplay by: Michael Armstrong; Adrian Hoven
- Produced by: Adrian Hoven
- Starring: Herbert Lom; Olivera Vučo; Udo Kier; Reggie Nalder; Herbert Fux
- Cinematography: Ernst W. Kalinke
- Edited by: Siegrun Jäger
- Music by: Michael Holm
- Production company: HIFI-Stereo-70 Filmvertrieb KG
- Distributed by: Hallmark Releasing (United States)
- Release date: 19 February 1970
- Running time: 97 minutes
- Country: West Germany
- Languages: English (Note: The film was shot with actors speaking both English and German, and both exclusively German and exclusively English dubs exist.); German

Mark of the Devil (German: Hexen bis aufs Blut gequält, lit. Witches Tortured Till They Bleed) is a 1970 West German historical horror film directed by Michael Armstrong, and starring Olivera Vučo, Udo Kier, Reggie Nalder, Herbert Fux, and Herbert Lom. Its plot follows a witch hunter in 17th-century Austria who begins to question his pursuits after witnessing a rogue witch hunter dubiously accuse the townspeople of a small village, and employ increasingly sadistic methods of torture against them.

It is most remembered for US marketing slogans devised by Hallmark Releasing Corp. for its 1972 release there that included "Positively the most horrifying film ever made" and "The first film rated V for violence", while sick bags were given free to the audience upon admission.

While not prosecuted for obscenity, the film was seized and confiscated in the UK under Section 3 of the Obscene Publications Act 1959 during the video nasty panic.

== Plot ==
Count Christian von Meruh is a God-fearing witch hunter and apprentice to Lord Cumberland in early 18th-century Austria. Christian arrives in a small Alpine village, where a self-sanctioned witch hunter named Albino has taken control over the townspeople, making unwarranted accusations of witchcraft against women who refuse his sexual advances. Albino's power results in numerous sadistic executions and torture of the accused.

After barmaid Vanessa Benedikt refuses Albino's sexual advances, he threatens her and accuses her of witchcraft, blasphemy, and having sex with the devil. Christian observes the confrontation in the bar. Waiting for Cumberland's arrival to the village, Christian develops a friendship with Vanessa, who insists to him she is not a witch. Vanessa soon becomes romantically attracted to Christian.

Cumberland arrives in the village to oversee the witch trials and review Albino's indictments. One woman, Deidre von Bergenstein, is accused of bearing the devil's child, though she asserts to Cumberland that in truth she was raped by a nobleman. Despite her protests of innocence and proclamation of her faith, Cumberland sentences Deidre to be tortured on a rack and later have her tongue ripped out until she confesses. After enduring various methods of torture, she is eventually burned alive in a public execution.

Wanting to protect Vanessa, Christian destroys the indictment against her, but Cumberland orders her to be detained until a new one can be produced. As Cumberland enforces tortures and executions based on Albino's indictments, Christian begins to see evidence that the trials in the village are scams to rob people of their land, money, and other personal belongings of value. Christian observes Cumberland give Baron Daumer, a man accused of sorcery, an ultimatum: If he surrenders his inherited land, his life will be spared, but if not, he will be executed.

Cumberland and Albino begin to clash over control, and a confrontation breaks out between the two men. Cumberland strangles Albino to death in a rage after Albino accuses him of being impotent, which Christian witnesses. The event causes a rift between them, resulting in Christian questioning Cumberland's morals and faith. When a family is arrested for witchcraft on the basis of putting on a puppet show, Christian begs Cumberland to spare them as they both know they are innocent; Cumberland refuses, insisting that some casualties are necessary in the pursuit of their cause, and that they will be honored in the afterlife as martyrs.

Christian helps Vanessa escape her prison cell, and she incites a revolt among the villagers to overthrow the witch hunters, revealing their corruption. A series of executions begin, including that of the Baron, who is beheaded, but the proceedings are stopped when the incensed villagers descend on the scene and attack the witch hunters. Cumberland manages to narrowly escape on a carriage, but Christian becomes a victim of the revolt, as the villagers believe him to be corrupt as well. He is hung up by his arms and killed, using a "witch catcher"-like device around his waist, moments before Vanessa can save him. Vanessa arrives and, sobbing, clings to Christian's body as the villagers quietly disperse.

== Cast ==
- Herbert Lom as Lord Cumberland
- Olivera Katarina as Vanessa Benedikt (credited as Olivera Vučo)
- Udo Kier as Count Christian von Meruh
- Reggie Nalder as Albino
- Herbert Fux as Executioner
- Michael Maien as Baron Daumer
- Ingeborg Schöner as Nobleman's Wife
- Johannes Buzalski as Advocate
- Gaby Fuchs as Deidre von Bergenstein
- Adrian Hoven as Nobleman

== Production ==
The film is based upon Michael Armstrong's 1969 script. The original plans were led by producer Adrian Hoven, who intended to produce, direct and star in the film. Hoven's version was a completely different film rumoured to have been called The Witch Hunter – Dr. Dracula. The film was made to cash in on the success of Michael Reeves' 1968 classic Witchfinder General. Hoven has been a collaborator of Jess Franco. He was an actor turned producer and director.

=== Casting ===
The film was star Udo Kier's second major film role; he had previously appeared in Shameless (1968), which he filmed in Vienna.

=== Filming ===
The production was filmed during the summer of 1969 in Austria. From the beginning production was difficult, including that at least half a dozen languages were spoken on set, which caused problems for the cast and crew. Producer Adrian Hoven and director Michael Armstrong disliked each other intensely and often argued over the slightest of things. Hoven made sure a small number of the scripts were kept on set and even cut some of Armstrong's footage, so his own ideas could be inserted in the film. Because cinematographer Ernst W. Kalinke was a friend of Hoven's, they would both film scenes without Armstrong's permission. It has been debated how much of Mark of the Devil was filmed by Armstrong and what by Hoven. Armstrong claims in his commentary track on the Blu-ray release by Arrow that they filmed nothing significant, although he did add the water torture scene featuring Hoven as an actor at the latter's request. To give the film some historical accuracy, it was filmed in an Austrian castle where actual witchfinding interrogations had taken place. This castle also served as a museum with authentic torture tools that were used in the film.

== Historical basis ==
The film (which The Aurum Film Encyclopedia: Horror calls "grotesquely sadistic") contains very strong simulations of graphic torture including a woman's tongue being ripped out of her head by tongue pincers, nuns being raped, nails to probe for the Devil's spot, whipping posts, fingers being cut off, racks and multitudes of vicious beatings.

The opening credits and voiceover make the exaggerated claim that over eight million people were condemned as witches and killed during the period in which the film is set. The scholarly consensus on the total number of executions for witchcraft ranges from 40,000–60,000.

== Release ==
Hexen bis aufs Blut gequält was released theatrically in West Germany on 19 February 1970.

Mark of the Devil vomit bag from 1972 (as seen in 2026)

Now titled Mark of the Devil, the film was released theatrically in the United States by Hallmark Releasing in early 1972, opening in Boston on 18 February that year. Hallmark's marketing campaign for the film highlighted its violent content, describing it as "rated V for violence," and sick bags were given to the audience upon admission. Specifically, newspaper advertisements for the film claimed that "Due to the horrifying scenes no one admitted without a 'stomach distress' bag (available free at box office)".

=== Box office ===
The film was more successful at the box office than Witchfinder General. This success is often attributed to the advertising campaign. The film had approximately 1,546,000 admissions in West Germany.

=== Critical response ===
The film has been criticized by many reviewers for being too violent to contain any message and far too exploitative whilst dealing with a serious historical subject. Other reviews praise the film for its soundtrack, special effects, and filming locations, consisting of the mountainous Austrian countryside and stately castles.

=== Home media ===
Mark of the Devil has been available in numerous home media formats in varying cuts. Elite Entertainment released the film on LaserDisc in 1997. The film was released on DVD by Anchor Bay Entertainment in 1998 and re-released by Blue Underground in 2004, with this release being deemed the most complete version of the film. Arrow Films released the film on March 17, 2015 uncut for the first time on Blu-ray Disc in the United Kingdom and United States. The release featured the High Rising Productions documentary film Mark of the Times and a special featurette over the distributor Hallmark Releasing with the documentary Hallmark of the Devil. The film is rated 18 by the British Board of Film Classification.

== Legacy ==
The University of Vienna's film studies conference "Mark of the Devil: On a Classic Exploitation Film" was held on 3–5 April 2014. In 2017 the Cine-Excess eJournal devoted a special issue to the film and its sequel, Mark of the Devil Part II, which includes a range of extensive articles (about topics such as authorship, marketing and censorship) and an interview with Joyce and Percy Hoven.

== Sequel ==
Producer Hoven delivered the official sequel, Mark of the Devil Part II (German: Hexen geschändet und zu Tode gequält) in 1973. In addition, several VHS companies sought to exploit the title's notoriety by retitling several unrelated European horror films as sequels. This included Mark of the Devil – Part III which was the 1975 Mexican film Sisters of Satan (a.k.a. Alucarda). Mark of the Devil – Part IV and Mark of the Devil – Part V (which featured scream queen Michelle Bauer on the box art even though she did not appear in the movie) were films from the popular Blind Dead series. Two low-budget sequels were the American-made Mark of the Devil 666: The Moralist (1995) released on VHS by Moore Video, and the more comically/horror-spoof toned Mark of the Devil 777: The Moralist, Part 2 (2022). The two later films are directly connected with storyline and characters.

== Sources ==
- Haines, Richard W. (2010). The Moviegoing Experience, 1968-2001. Jefferson, North Carolina: McFarland. ISBN 978-0-786-48074-6.
- Lowenstein, Adam (2005). Shocking Representation: Historical Trauma, National Cinema, and the Modern Horror Film. New York City, New York: Columbia University Press. ISBN 978-0-231-13247-3.
