= Peter Craze =

British actor (1946–2020)

- Craze in Terror (1978)
- Born: Peter David Craze; 27 August 1946; Redruth, Cornwall, England
- Died: 30 December 2020 (aged 74)
- Occupation: Theatre director
- Relatives: Michael Craze (brother)

Peter David Craze (27 August 1946 – 30 December 2020) was a British actor, brother of fellow actor Michael Craze.

He made many television appearances, including Doctor Who (The Space Museum, The War Games and Nightmare of Eden), EastEnders and Blake's 7, and appeared in films such as The Beast in the Cellar (1970), Terror (1978) and Hitler's SS: Portrait in Evil (1985).

He was principal of Drama Studio London until 2012.

In 2014, Craze directed the play The Trials of Oscar Wilde, which toured the UK and was co-authored by Merlin Holland, Oscar Wilde's grandson. Craze also narrated the first season of the hit children's animated fantasy television series The Dreamstone.

He died on 30 December 2020, at the age of 74.

== Filmography ==
Year	Title	Role	Notes
1971	The Beast in the Cellar	Roy	
1978	Terror	Les	
1985	Hitler's SS: Portrait in Evil	Keilbach	TV movie
2007	Dangerous Parking	Suicidal James	
