= Australian Film Development Corporation =

Film funding body set up by the Australian government

The Australian Film Development Corporation was an organisation created and funded by the Australian Government in the 1970s, intended to allow filmmakers in the Australian film industry to create movies for everyone to see. In 1975 it was replaced with Australian Film Commission.

== History ==
=== Creation of the Corporation ===
The AFDC was created so that Australians could create and distribute high-quality Australian films, for everyone to see.

In 1970, Prime Minister John Gorton asked five people to become a part of the AFDC. Those people were John Darling, Ronald S. Elliott, Talbot S. Duckmanton, Denys E. Brown, and Barry Jones. John Darling IV was the chairman of Darling & Co., as well as a member of the Australian National University Council. Ronald S. Elliott was a General Manager for the Commonwealth Development Bank. T. S. Duckmanton the General Manager of the Australian Broadcasting Commission. D. E. Brown was the Producer-in-Chief for the Film Division of the Australian News and Information Bureau, as well as a member of the Australian National Film Board. Barry Jones was a lecturer in history, a member of the Australian Council for the Arts, and a governor of the Australian Film Institute. The AFDC was brought to the Australian House of Representatives in March 1970. The House of Representatives did not hesitate to pass the Corp, which had bipartisan support.

Tom Stacey was the manager of the corporation.

=== AFDC Replacement: Australian Film Commission ===
In 1975, the Australian Film Development was replaced by the Australian Film Commission. This was partly due to the fact that the Australian film industry is a fast-paced environment, which endures change quite often. Another reason was that the Australian Film Commission made a point of focusing on cultural and artistic excellence, rather than economic success. With the change to the Australian Film Commission, directors were given more funding in order to create better quality films for the public.

== Films funded ==
Among the films in which the AFDC invested were:

- Devlin (1971)
- Stockade (1971)
- Stork (1971)
- Marco Polo Jnr
- Spyforce
- Private Collection (1972)
- Sunstruck (1972)
- The Adventures of Barry McKenzie (1972)
- Night of Fear (1972)
- Libido
- A City's Child
- Boney
- Seven Little Australians (1973)
- Homicide (1973)
- Alvin Purple (1973)
- Avengers of the Reef (1973)
- Naturally Free (1974)
- Promised Woman (1974)
- Petersen (1974)
- Inn of the Damned (1974)
- Stone (1974)
- The Cars That Ate Paris (1974)
- The True Story of Eskimo Nell (1975)
- The Man from Hong Kong (1975)
- The Great Macarthy (1975)
- The Devil's Playground
- The Removalists
