= The Blood on Satan's Claw =

1971 British film by Piers Haggard

- Original British quad poster
- Directed by: Piers Haggard
- Written by: Robert Wynne-Simmons; Piers Haggard
- Produced by: Malcolm B. Heyworth; Peter L. Andrews
- Starring: Patrick Wymark; Linda Hayden; Barry Andrews; Michele Dotrice; James Hayter
- Cinematography: Dick Bush
- Edited by: Richard Best
- Music by: Marc Wilkinson
- Production companies: Tigon British Film Productions; Chilton Film and Television Enterprises
- Distributed by: Tigon Pictures
- Release dates: 17 January 1971 (Birmingham); 16 July 1971 (London)
- Running time: 93 minutes
- Country: United Kingdom
- Language: English
- Budget: £82,000

The Blood on Satan's Claw, originally released as Satan's Skin, (Note: According to director Piers Haggard, the film's original working title was The Devil's Touch, which later became Satan's Skin. Following a brief release as Satan's Skin in England in January 1971, the film premiered in the United States as The Blood on Satan's Claw and in London under this same title in the summer of 1971. While the film was internationally most widely-released as The Blood on Satan's Claw, it retained the Satan's Skin title in some territories, such as France.) is a 1971 British period supernatural horror film directed by Piers Haggard and starring Patrick Wymark, Linda Hayden, and Barry Andrews. Set in early 18th-century England, it follows the residents of a rural village whose youth fall under the influence of a demonic presence after a local farmer unearths a mysterious deformed skull buried in a field. It is widely regarded as one of three films that introduced the folk horror aesthetic to British cinema, an "unholy trinity" whose other entries are Witchfinder General (1968) and The Wicker Man (1973).

The screenplay for the film was originally written by Robert Wynne-Simmons as an anthology of horror stories set in a small village, and had the working title of The Devil's Skin. After director Haggard was hired for the project, he and Wynne-Simmons reworked the screenplay into a single cohesive narrative. Principal photography took place in 1970, mainly in the Chiltern Hills region of England, with some filming also taking place at Pinewood Studios.

The film was briefly released in the United Kingdom by Tigon Pictures under the title Satan's Skin in January 1971. It premiered in New York City in April 1971 under the title The Blood on Satan's Claw, distributed by Cannon Films, and became a regular feature through the remainder of the year at drive-in theaters in the United States, paired as a double feature with The Beast in the Cellar. Tigon Pictures re-released the film as The Blood on Satan's Claw on 16 July 1971 in London, where it screened at the New Victoria Theatre, though this engagement lasted only one week following underwhelming ticket sales. The film did, however, continue to screen throughout the United Kingdom.

The Blood on Satan's Claw was met with mixed reviews from critics, and underperformed at the box office, though it did receive praise for its performances, cinematography, and atmosphere. In the intervening years, the film has gained a cult following, and has been cited by several film scholars as a progenitor of the folk horror genre. A spoken-word adaptation of the film, featuring Mark Gatiss and Hayden, was released by Audible in 2018, followed by a 2023 novelization written by Wynne-Simmons, its original screenwriter.

== Plot ==
In a rural village in early 18th-century England, farmer Ralph Gower uncovers a deformed skull with one intact eye and strange fur. He insists that the local judge look at it, but it mysteriously vanishes. The judge disregards the incident, crediting it to Ralph's superstitious fears. Meanwhile, Peter Edmonton brings his fiancée, Rosalind Barton, to meet his aunt, Mistress Banham, with whom the judge is staying. Mistress Banham and the judge disapprove of the match and arrange for Rosalind to sleep in a disused attic room. Rosalind begins screaming during the night and injures Banham when she investigates, causing her to fall mysteriously ill.

Despite Peter's protests, the judge arranges to have Rosalind committed; as she is led out, Peter glimpses a monstrous claw in place of her hand. Meanwhile, three children find a claw from the deformed body from which the skull presumably came while playing next to a field. That evening, Mistress Banham disappears. Convinced that the house contains evil, Peter sneaks into the attic room at night and is attacked by a creature with a furred claw. He tries to hack it with a knife, but when the judge bursts in, he finds that Peter has severed his own hand. Though sceptical of supernatural involvement, the judge borrows a book on witchcraft. The next day, the judge departs for London, leaving the pompous and slow-witted Squire Middleton in charge, but promises to return.

Mark, one of the three children, is lured out by his classmates, who are playing truant from their scripture classes so they can play ritualistic games in a ruined church under their ringleader, Angel Blake. Mark is tricked into playing a lethal game of blind man's buff, and his body is hidden in his family's woodshed. Angel Blake attempts to seduce the curate, Reverend Fallowfield. When he resists, she tells him that Mark is dead and "had the devil in him, so we cut it out". At Mark's funeral, Angel's father speaks to the squire, accusing the curate of attempting to molest his daughter and, very possibly, of killing Mark.

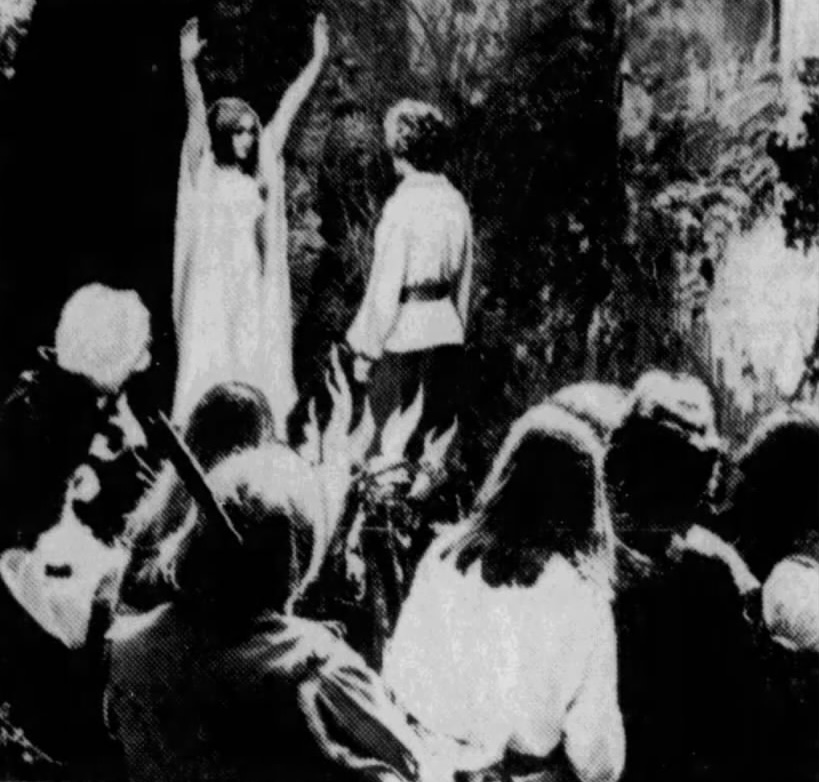
Press photo of the film's climactic sequence

Mark's sister, Cathy, is gathering flowers for his grave when two boys attack and bind her under the pretence of a game. Ralph, who has been courting her, hears her scream but cannot find her. The boys lead Cathy to Angel, who marches her in a procession with the other children to the ruined church, where they perform a Black Mass to the demon Behemoth, who appears as a furred beast. The children tear Cathy's dress to reveal fur on her back. All the children have been growing these patches of fur, which have been flayed from their bodies to restore the demon's physical form. The cult ritualistically rape and murder Cathy and flay the fur from her back. Ralph finds her body in the church and carries her to the squire, who releases Fallowfield but is unable to arrest Angel, who has vanished.

Ralph finds men attempting to drown a girl named Margaret, whom they suspect of witchcraft. He rescues her and finds fur on her leg. He convinces a doctor to remove it, but when Margaret wakes, she proves to be a committed servant of the devil and flees. The judge returns and sets dogs to track her. Margaret seeks out Angel, but Angel abandons her when she realises she no longer bears a piece of the demon's skin.

Margaret is caught and, interrogated by the judge, reveals that the cult will meet at the ruined church to complete the ritual to rebuild the demon's body, where the last believer will sacrifice a limb. The judge assembles a mob to destroy the cult and demon. Ralph, whose leg has sprouted fur, awakens in the church surrounded by the cult. He nearly cuts off his leg in a trance before the mob attack. In the ensuing violence, Angel is killed, and the judge kills the demon with a sword, breaking its hold on Ralph and returning him to normal.

== Cast ==
- Patrick Wymark as The Judge
- Linda Hayden as Angel Blake
- Barry Andrews as Ralph Gower
- Michele Dotrice as Margaret
- Wendy Padbury as Cathy Vespers
- Anthony Ainley as Reverend Fallowfield
- Charlotte Mitchell as Ellen
- Tamara Ustinov as Rosalind Barton
- Simon Williams as Peter Edmonton
- James Hayter as Squire Middleton
- Howard Goorney as The Doctor
- Avice Landone as Isobel Banham
- Robin Davies as Mark Vespers
- Godfrey James as Angel's Father

Actress Roberta Tovey has an uncredited role as the coven member who lures Padbury's character to her death.

== Production ==
=== Development ===
The film was originally envisioned by screenwriter Robert Wynne-Simmons as an anthology of three loosely connected but separate stories set in a Victorian era village, at the request of Tigon British Film Productions. The disparate stories included one involving a woman locked in an attic by her abusive aunt; a group of children who uncover a monstrous carcass in a field; and a man who cuts off his own hand, which is possessed by a demon. Each of the stories were connected by an overarching narrative of the pastoral village being infiltrated by various evil forces. Wynne-Simmons's screenplay was inspired in part by the Manson Family and the Mary Bell child murders. He later elaborated:

The central theme of the whole film was the stamping out of the old religions. Not by Christianity, but by an atheistic belief that all sorts of things must be blocked out of the mind. So the Judge represents a dogged enlightenment, if you like, who is saying "Don't let these things lurk in dark corners. Bring it out into the open and then get rid of it. When it becomes a fully-fledged cult, it will show itself."

Tigon executives ultimately opted to have Wynne-Simmons transpose the story to an early-eighteenth-century farming community, having felt that the Victorian Era had been exhausted by various genre films. Wynne-Simmons stated that he was specifically asked by the producers to include a number of elements from the studio's previous film, Witchfinder General, such as the "Book of Witches" as well as the sequence in which Margaret is ducked in a body of water by locals who suspect she is a witch. "This had to be included because it had been so successful in Witchfinder General, so they wanted to repeat it," he recalled. "I didn't mind that so much, as it did show the incredible stupidity of people at the time." Additionally, several other changes were mandated by Tigon, including a redraft of the ending, which originally had the Judge enlisting a militia to murder the entire village to eradicate the cult. Tigon executives deemed this ending too bleak, and it was replaced with a finale in which the demon is defeated, and the villagers are spared.

Director Piers Haggard was hired to direct the project, and worked with Wynne-Simmons to retool the screenplay from its anthology format to a singular, cohesive narrative. Summarizing the screenplay, Haggard commented in 2003:

All the powerful, imaginative sequences of horror are Robert's invention. Nothing was taken away in the credit from him for conceiving that sequence of experiences and images and the whole story. My writing contribution is entirely in the area of character, of character subtlety, trying to make family relationships resonate. Some of the non-action stuff is mine, like the kids wandering through the woods and you're haunted by fears and anxieties and so on. That stuff is mostly mine, so that was my contribution, to try and thicken the texture.

By Haggard's account, the film's original working title was The Devil's Touch, which was subsequently changed to Satan's Skin.

=== Casting ===
Haggard says Linda Hayden had to be used as she was under contract to Tony Tenser. Tamara Ustinov, the daughter of actor Peter Ustinov, was cast in part because of her name. The role of the judge was originally offered to Peter Cushing, who declined it due to his wife's illness; Christopher Lee was considered, but his fee was too high for the budget so Patrick Wymark was cast instead. The film was Wymark's last English language film and was released three months after his death.

With the younger cast, Haggard dedicated two weeks prior to the shoot to hold rehearsals.

=== Filming ===
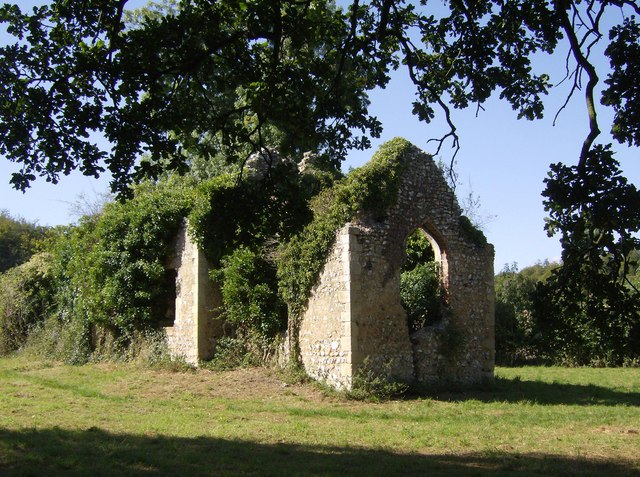
The ruined Saint James Church in Bix Bottom was the setting for some of the film's most dramatic sequences

Filming began on 14 April 1970 on an initial budget of £75,000, which expanded to £82,000. The shoot lasted approximately eight weeks, and mainly took place in the small village of Bix Bottom, Oxfordshire, located in the Chiltern Hills. The ruined church that figures prominently is the old Saint James Church in Bix Bottom, which had been abandoned in 1875. Prior to its appearance in The Blood on Satan's Claw, the church had been used as a location in The Witches (1966).

The scene in which the villagers hold a funeral for Mark Vespers was shot in the village of Hurley, while portions of the woodland sequences were filmed in the Warburg Nature Reserve and Black Park near Iver Heath, Buckinghamshire. Additionally, some filming took place at Pinewood Film Studios.

Several of the younger cast members, particularly Hayden, Ustinov, and Richard Williams, recalled that Haggard's direction was concise and that the shoot operated smoothly.

The film was shot by cinematographer Dick Bush. When devising the film's visual elements, Haggard was influenced by the works of Ingmar Bergman, particularly The Seventh Seal (1957) and The Virgin Spring (1960). Haggard adopted a "painterly" style for the film, marked by low camera angles that cast the actors on high landscapes against open skies.

Anthony Ainley, who plays a curate who Linda Hayden's character attempted to seduce, once said in an interview, "When it came to doing the nude scene where Angel comes into the rectory at night and disrobes this was done at least three times and Linda was spot on with every take...she was a total professional with a refined sense of the erotic unusual for her age...I believe she was only 17 at the time."

In 2024, interviewed for the 88 Films release of The Blood on Satan’s Claw, Wendy Padbury revealed that director Piers Haggard had taken her out to a field one lunch break and told her that he wanted the scene of Cathy’s ritualistic rape and murder to go further than the script required, and that he needed her "clothes to be taken off" for it, that it was "absolutely integral" to the film. Padbury stated that she felt "vulnerable", saying that Haggard made her feel she "would be the worst person on Earth" if she didn't do it.

Feeling "pressured", Padbury agreed to the director’s demand, and the rape scene was shot later that day. She called the experience "horrendous", saying that the incident had clouded her memories of an otherwise happy shoot where her fellow actors and the cameraman [Dick Bush] were "lovely" to her. Bush had made her feel better after filming the scene by telling her that he felt the BBFC would insist on cuts to such a scene of sexual violence.

== Music ==
The film's score was composed by Marc Wilkinson, an Australian composer who had previously worked alongside Haggard at the National Theatre. "[He] had a wonderful command of strange sounds," said the director. "He wasn't somebody who would ever give you a stock sound. And I think he absolutely excelled himself. It's certainly one of the best scores I've ever had for a film."

== Release ==
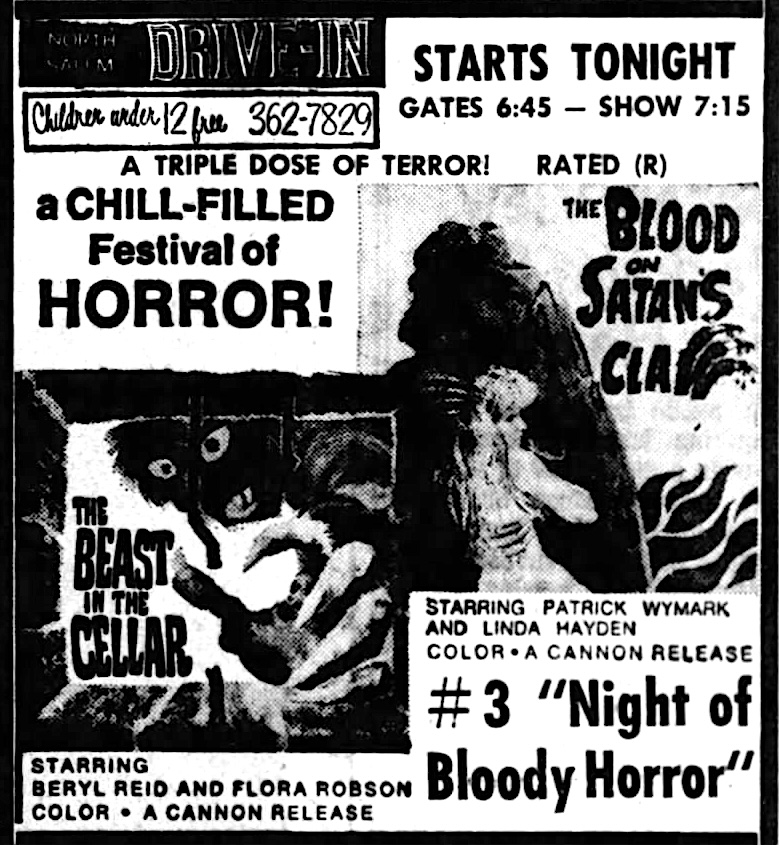
Newspaper advertisement for a double feature screening with The Beast in the Cellar in Salem, Oregon, October 1971

In its native England, the film was passed by the British Board of Film Classification (BBFC) with an X rating. Under ten seconds of cuts were mandated by the BBFC, though some sequences were optically darkened, including the scene in which a nude Angel attempts to seduce the Curate. According to screenwriter Wynne-Simmons, a shot of Angel performing oral sex on the demon was also significantly truncated and darkened, though a brief portion of it appears in the final cut of the film.

The film was originally given a brief theatrical release under the title Satan's Skin on 17 January 1971, screening in Birmingham as a double feature with Cauldron of Blood. It continued to be exhibited under this title through June 1971, screening in Coventry, Liverpool, and Coleshill.

In the United States, the film was acquired by the distribution company Cannon Films, who released it theatrically under the revised title The Blood on Satan's Claw in the spring of 1971, with a New York City premiere taking place on 14 April 1971 at the New Amsterdam Theatre in Manhattan. It began screening at the Victoria and Delancey Theatres in Manhattan two days later. The film went on to screen frequently in the American drive-in theatre circuit for the remainder of 1971, paired with The Beast in the Cellar, another Tigon-produced film, billed as a "Festival of Horror." (Note: Newspaper sources show the film screened at various drive-ins throughout the United States from June through December 1971 in various states, including California, Massachusetts, North Carolina, Ohio, Oregon, Pennsylvania, and Washington.)

Tigon Pictures reissued the film in the United Kingdom under the revised title The Blood on Satan's Claw, premiering it on 8 July 1971 in Newcastle upon Tyne. It subsequently opened at London's New Victoria Cinema beginning 16 July 1971, with the theatre accommodating 2,600 guests. However, following low ticket sales, the film was pulled from the theatre after showing for only one week. It did, however, continue to screen in several British cities, including Darlington, Bodmin, and Manchester, as well as Glasgow and Newport, Wales.

On U.S. television, the film was frequently aired on Chiller Theatre throughout the 1970s.

In 2002, the American Cinematheque in Los Angeles held a revival screening of the film as part of their 3rd Festival of Fantasy, Horror and Science-Fiction.

=== Title variation ===
The film was first released in the United Kingdom under its original title Satan's Skin, which was altered for subsequent releases. Variant prints of the film exist with both the revised The Blood on Satan's Claw and Blood on Satan's Claw appearing in the opening titles, which has led to the two names being used interchangeably on home media releases. U.S. posters used The Blood on Satan's Claw, while British posters (and newspaper advertisements from the time) used the slightly shortened title Blood on Satan's Claw.

=== Home media ===
The Blood on Satan's Claw first received a VHS release in the United States in 1985 by Paragon Video Productions. It was re-released in this format in 1993 by MGM Home Entertainment. In 2005, it was released by Anchor Bay Entertainment in a Region 2 box set along with several other Tigon British Film Distributors films, including Witchfinder General, The Beast in the Cellar, and others.

The British label Odeon Entertainment released Blood on Satan's Claw on Blu-ray in 2013. In May 2019, the England-based Screenbound Pictures issued a DVD and limited edition Blu-ray featuring a new restoration of the film. In November 2019, Severin Films followed with another limited edition Blu-ray, along with a bonus CD of the original score, limited to 3,000 units. The British distributor 88 Films released a 4K UHD Blu-ray edition in 2024.

== Reception ==
=== Contemporary response ===
Upon its theatrical release, The Blood on Satan's Claw received mixed reviews from film critics. The Monthly Film Bulletin wrote: "The plot of Satan's Skin, which concerns the spread of a Satanic cult amongst the children of a seventeenth-century rural village, is a potentially intriguing amalgamation of Witchfinder General and Children of the Damned. The alliance of innocence and evil has always been a telling theme for horror, and here – for some of the time at least – director Piers Haggard takes advantage of it. Linda Hayden is excellent as Angel Blake, the leader of the devil children, and the sequence in which she attempts to seduce the local priest in his own church is extremely powerful. But as the film progresses, its script and direction lose in subtlety and gain in crudeness: the sequence showing, in nauseating detail, the removal of the "devil skin" from a girl is both stylistically inept and thematically irrelevant. And though Patrick Wymark tries hard to put some life back into things for the climax, the atmosphere has by then been conclusively shattered."

Peter McGarry of the Coventry Evening Telegraph praised the film as "remarkable... directed at a carefully measured pace by Piers Haggard, [it] avoids all the clichés and concentrates on atmosphere. The photography is excellent, and there are fine performances." Clyde Gilmour of the Toronto Star noted that "subtlety and suggestion gradually give way to blatant sensationalism before the finish. But Linda Hayden is memorable as the evil Angel, and Patrick Wymark is his customary solid self as an oaken-hearted judge who rallies the citizens against Lucifer's minions."

Vincent Canby of The New York Times praised the performances in the film, adding that it has "a good deal of the quality of an H. P. Lovecraft work, in the vulnerability of even its heroic characters, as well as in its pastoral landscape that contains the threat of "eeveel" within every sun-dappled glade. Most particularly, it contains Lovecraft's perfectly straight-faced acceptance of a universe whose natural order may, at any time, be overturned by supernatural disorder." The New York Daily News's Ann Guarino awarded the film a two out of four star-rating, deeming it a "routine horror" film.

=== Modern assessment ===
In the years since its original release, The Blood on Satan's Claw has received critical praise. The film has also earned a cult following, largely owed to its frequent airing on network television which introduced it to a wider audience.

Mark Dinning, reviewing the film for Empire, wrote: "This haunting horror is as much Hammer wannabe as a Witchfinder General re-hash—and surprisingly effective on both counts... The whole thing, directed with panache by Piers Haggard (great grandnephew of King Solomon's Mines author, H. Rider Haggard), falls to pieces by the end, but the prevailing mood is hard to shake." Time Out noted that the film "vacillates wildly between hilariously unconvincing and genuinely nasty" but praised the cinematography and musical score, awarding the film a three out of five star-rating. Writing for Scream magazine, Fliss Burton noted that the plot is "convoluted", but no less described it as a "richly atmospheric film, with a pervading sense of dread".

In an essay for British Horror Cinema (2002), writer Leon Hunt described The Blood on Satan's Claw as "an intoxicating, if not entirely coherent blend of rural horror, generational conflict, and fin de siècle bleakness", and draws parallels between it and Margaret Murray's nonfiction book The Witch-Cult in Western Europe (1921). In his book Horror Films of the 1970s (2012), John Kenneth Muir similarly praised the film as "a bizarre, frightening film despite the meandering of its plot, emerging as a creepy, atmospheric nose-dive into the irrational". Reviewing the film for its fiftieth anniversary, Michael Gursky of MovieWeb commended it as "a gorgeous, weird little British chiller" that is "memorably moody and marvelously macabre.".

On the review aggregator website Rotten Tomatoes, 73% of 11 critics' reviews are positive.

== Analysis ==
Film journalist Brad Weismann cites the film as an example of several British folk horror films of the 1960s and 1970s in which ancient demons, gods, and other supernatural entities "crept into contemporary life".

Writer Paul Newland notes in his book British Rural Landscapes on Film (2016) that The Blood on Satan's Claw has also been interpreted as a "seventeenth-century-set articulation" on the "slow and painful death" of the counterculture movement of the 1960s. Newland also comments the film's preoccupation with the English countryside and its "potentially subterranean" landscape, noting:

British rural folk horror films such as Blood on Satan’s Claw... uncover the idiosyncratic nature of specific rural places in Britain, often, at the same time, acknowledging that there are ways of life and systems of behaviour and ideas that effectively stand opposed to (or at least might inform, in a dialectical sense) modernity (nascent or otherwise), technology, rationality, and industrial and post-industrial life.

== Legacy ==
The Blood on Satan's Claw has come to be regarded as one of the foundational works of British folk horror. In his 2010 BBC documentary series A History of Horror, writer and actor Mark Gatiss grouped the film with Witchfinder General (1968) and The Wicker Man (1973) as key examples of the form. The three films subsequently became widely known as the genre's "Unholy Trinity".

The film is also closely associated with the development of the term "folk horror" itself. The phrase was used in contemporary coverage of the production, and director Piers Haggard later adopted it when discussing the film retrospectively. The British Film Institute has noted that the imagery and narratives of The Blood on Satan's Claw, Witchfinder General and The Wicker Man subsequently helped define the genre.

Its influence has continued into later British horror. Writer-director William McGregor cited The Blood on Satan's Claw and The Wicker Man as direct inspirations for his 2018 folk-horror film Gwen. Reece Shearsmith likewise cited the film, alongside Witchfinder General, when discussing the period atmosphere sought for Ben Wheatley's A Field in England (2013).

The film's legacy has also generated substantial scholarly attention. In 2021, Liverpool University Press published a volume devoted entirely to the film as part of its Devil's Advocates series, examining its place within folk horror, its treatment of landscape and localism, and its relationship to British counterculture and national identity.

== Related works ==
Gatiss was featured in a spoken-word adaptation of the film, alongside Linda Hayden (playing a different role to the one she played in the film), released by Audible.com in 2018.

In 2023, a novelization of the screenplay, adapted by the original co-writer Robert Wynne-Simmons, was published under the title Blood on Satan's Claw: or, the Devil's Skin.

== Bibliography ==
- Hunt, Leon (2002). "Necromancy in the UK: witchcraft and the occult in British horror". British Horror Cinema. Psychology Press. ISBN 978-0-415-23003-2 – via Google Books.
- Evans-Powell, David (2021). The Blood on Satan's Claw. Devil's Advocates. Liverpool University Press. ISBN 978-1-80034-605-5 – via Google Books.
- Hamilton, John (2005). Beasts in the Cellar: The Exploitation Film Career of Tony Tenser. FAB Press. ISBN 978-1-903254-26-4 – via Google Books.
- Harper, Sue; Smith, Justin; Allen, Dave (2012). British Film Culture in the 1970s: The Boundaries of Pleasure. Edinburgh University Press. ISBN 978-0-7486-4078-2 – via Google Books.
- Markusen, Bruce (2021). Hosted Horror on Television: The Films and Faces of Shock Theater, Creature Features and Chiller Theater. McFarland & Company. ISBN 978-1-4766-8461-1 – via Google Books.
- McDonald, Keith; Johnson, Wayne (2021). Contemporary Gothic and Horror Film. Anthem Press. ISBN 978-1-78527-774-0 – via Google Books.
- Muir, John (22 November 2012). Horror Films of the 1970s. McFarland & Company. ISBN 978-0-7864-9156-8 – via Google Books.
- Newland, Paul (2016). British rural landscapes on film. Manchester University Press. ISBN 978-1-5261-0469-4 – via Google Books.
- Paszylk, Bartłomiej (8 June 2009). The Pleasure and Pain of Cult Horror Films: An Historical Survey. McFarland & Company. pp. 190–191. ISBN 978-0-7864-3695-8 – via Google Books.
- Rigby, Jonathan (2000). English Gothic: A Century of Horror Cinema. Century of the British Horror Film. Reynolds & Hearn. ISBN 978-1-903111-01-7 – via Google Books.
- Senn, Bryan (2019). "Twice the Thrills! Twice the Chills!": Horror and Science Fiction Double Features, 1955-1974. McFarland & Company. ISBN 978-1-4766-6894-9 – via Google Books.
- Weismann, Brad (2021). Lost in the Dark: A World History of Horror Film. University Press of Mississippi. ISBN 978-1-4968-3324-2 – via Google Books.
