= The Beast in the Cellar =

1970 British film by James Kelley

- Theatrical release poster
- Directed by: James Kelly
- Written by: James Kelly
- Produced by: Graham Harris executive Tony Tenser assoc Christopher Neame
- Starring: Beryl Reid; Flora Robson; John Hamill; Tessa Wyatt; T. P. McKenna; Vernon Dobtcheff
- Cinematography: Harry Waxman; Desmond Dickinson
- Edited by: Nicholas Napier-Bell
- Music by: Tony Macaulay
- Production companies: Tigon British Film Productions; Leander Films
- Distributed by: Tigon British Film Productions
- Release date: 16 July 1971
- Running time: 89 minutes
- Country: United Kingdom
- Language: English

The Beast in the Cellar is a 1971 British horror film written and directed by James Kelly and starring Beryl Reid and Flora Robson. The film was produced by Leander Films and Tigon British Film Productions.

== Plot ==
Soldiers stationed at a rural army base in Lancashire are being mauled to death in the surrounding woodland. The authorities suspect a wild cat, but sisters Joyce and Ellie Ballantyne, who live in a house nearby, fear that the soldiers are actually being murdered by their brother Steven, who has been locked in their cellar for nearly 30 years.

Joyce and Ellie discover that Steven has dug a tunnel out of the cellar, allowing him to come and go as he pleases. They also find the body of one of the soldiers. As they fill in the tunnel, Joyce suffers a fall, forcing Ellie to complete the task alone. Ellie then buries Steven's victim near the house.

With Joyce now bedridden (and looked after by Nurse Sutherland), Ellie realises that she cannot cope on her own and calls in the army and police. She tells them that Steven is her and Joyce's younger brother, born after their soldier father's return from the First World War. She adds that their father had been left shell-shocked by his experiences and was violent towards Steven. After their parents died, Joyce, not wanting Steven to end up like his father, resolved to prevent him from being called up at the start of the Second World War. To this end, she and Ellie drugged Steven and placed him in the cellar, thereafter lacing his water supply with sleeping pills to keep him under control. After being physically abused by his soldier father, then incarcerated for three decades by his sisters, Steven has developed a hatred of uniformed army men and regressed to the level of a savage.

Steven re-enters the house and lunges at Joyce, who is wearing their father's army overcoat and cap. He is fatally shot by one of the soldiers. Ellie realises that Steven did not mean to attack Joyce, but a framed bedside photograph of their father in uniform.

== Cast ==
- Beryl Reid as Ellie Ballantyne
- Flora Robson as Joyce Ballantyne
- John Hamill as Corporal Alan Marlow
- Tessa Wyatt as Nurse Joanna Sutherland
- T. P. McKenna as Superintendent Paddick
- John Kelland as Sergeant Young
- David Dodimead as Dr Spencer
- Vernon Dobtcheff as Sir Bernard Newsmith
- Dafydd Havard as Stephen Ballantyne
- Gail Lidstone as young Ellie
- Elizabeth Choice as young Joyce
- Merlyn Ward as young Stephen
- Anthony Heaton as Anderson
- Chris Chittell as Baker
- Peter Craze as Roy
- Annabel Littledale as Gloria
- Howard Rawlinson as young soldier
- Roberta Tovey as paper girl
- Robert Wilde as soldier in NAAFI
- Reg Lever as ambulance man

== Production ==
The film was originally called Young Man, I Think You're Dying based on a line from the folk song "Barbara Allen". Christopher Neame says the central idea was based on a true story about two sisters who did not want their brother to go to war, so locked him up in the cellar. Neame developed the film for Tigon Pictures and says Tony Tenser of Tigon originally rejected it then changed his mind.

Beryl Reid recalled it "was a really difficult film to do, because we were on a limited budget and we had very long takes. I had to do an awful lot of talking." Reid later wrote that she was "disappointed" that the filmmakers, "in some rather cheap effects afterwards", had turned the film "into a much more bloodthirsty and horrible picture than either of us had imagined. We thought it was going to be just this rather splendid script."

Filming took place at Pinewood Studios in March 1970. Christopher Neame says Tigon formed an association with Hemdale, who managed the composer. He says they insisted on using the music score although Neame felt it did not work.

Neame later called the film "all right. Okay, overwordy and the exigencies of the budget show through the cracks in the wallpaper."

== Release ==
The film was released in the UK on 16 July 1971 on a double bill with The Blood on Satan's Claw (1971).

The film was acquired for North American distribution by The Cannon Group Inc., and released theatrically at drive-ins in Philadelphia, Pennsylvania on December 1, 1971; again it was paired with The Blood on Satan's Claw.

=== Home media ===
The film was released in Canada on DVD by Maple Pictures on 6 December 2005. It was later released in the United States by Trinity on 14 February 2006. In 2011, it was released twice by Allegro Corporation on 1 February, and 7 June respectively. The latter release was part of the "Psycho Killers" 4 Movie Marathon. It was released by Films Around The World Inc. on 11 November 2015.

=== Critical reception ===
In The Monthly Film Bulletin David Mcgillivray wrote: "James Kelly, a graduate from television scriptwriting, reveals an understanding of the mechanics of suspense, particularly during the macabre climax of his first film where the 'thing', first glimpsed as a shape hiding behind the banisters, then as a Nosferatu-type shadow of a talon on the wall, crawls up the stairs. Unfortunately, the material which precedes this is stretched so far beyond its natural dramatic length that the atmosphere never manages to get much of a grip on the imagination, and some consistently ill-chosen music doesn't help. Only the occasional line of dialogue ... conveys the precise nuance of the situation which the film milks so laboriously – that of the sweet old ladies struggling to live with their unspeakably nasty secret. And in the context of their impassive gentility, the obligatory injections of sex (a girl having her knickers pulled down in the spinsters' barn) and gore (Ellie pushing a clawed eyeball back into its socket) seem all the more obtrusive."

Author and film critic Leonard Maltin gave the film 2/4 stars, stating that Reid's and Robson's performances brought the movie to an average level.

TV Guide awarded the film 1/4 stars, stating that "The potentially interesting premise is undone by an extremely chatty script."

The Observer called it "limp rubbish".

Leslie Halliwell said: "Idiotically boring farrago, totally lacking in suspense and wasting good talent."

Charles Tatum from eFilmCritic gave the film 2/5 stars, offering similar criticism towards the film's overly long dull stretches, and lack of effectiveness during the attack sequences. Tatum did however commend Reid and Robson's performances.

Andrew Smith from Popcorn Pictures awarded the film a score of 3/10, writing, "The Beast in the Cellar has an interesting approach to its subject matter with it’s [sic] characterisation of the two leads and it’s [sic] attempts to humanise them as much as it can. However this is horror after all and what we have is a pretty feeble but traditional British horror flick where you don’t see the monster until the very end and when you do, you realise you’ve been had for the last hour and a half."

On the review aggregator website Rotten Tomatoes, 17% of 6 critics' reviews are positive, with an average rating of 2.5/10.

== See also ==
- British horror cinema
- List of British films of 1971
