= The Ballad of Eskimo Nell =

Adult folk tale

"The Ballad of Eskimo Nell" (Roud 10124) is a bawdy rhymed poem or song that recounts the tale of Deadeye Dick, his accomplice Mexican Pete and a woman they meet on their travels named Eskimo Nell. The ballad makes frequent use of body-related terminology, with humorous consequences.

== Traditional words ==
There are multiple variations of the poem and some stanzas are left out of certain versions, but the basic narrative structure remains constant. It details the adventures of the generously endowed Dead-Eye Dick and his gunslinging sidekick Mexican Pete. Fed up with their sex life at Dead Man's Creek, they travel to the Rio Grande. There they visit a whore-house, but before Dick has finished with two out of the 40 whores, they are confronted by Eskimo Nell. She is described as something of a sexual champion, and challenges Dick to satisfy her. Dick accepts, but Nell's skill and power soon gets the better of him and he climaxes prematurely. Pete attempts to avenge his friend's disappointment by sticking his gun into Nell's vagina and firing all six rounds, but all this achieves is to bring Nell to her own orgasm. She chides the pair for their poor performance and expresses nostalgia for her home in the frozen North, where the men apparently have better staying power. Dick and Pete return to Dead Man's Creek, their pride severely dented.

The opening lines (in one version) are:

When a man grows old, and his balls grow cold,
And the tip of his prick turns blue,
When it bends in the middle like a one string fiddle
He can tell you a tale or two

So pull up a seat, and buy me one neat
And a tale to you I will tell,
About Dead-Eye Dick and Mexican Pete,
And a harlot named Eskimo Nell.

When Dead-Eye Dick and Mexican Pete
Go forth in search of fun,
It's Dead-Eye Dick that swings the prick,
And Mexican Pete the gun.

When Dead-Eye Dick and Mexican Pete
Are sore, depressed and sad,
It's always a cunt that bears the brunt,
But the shooting's not so bad.

Now Dead-Eye Dick and Mexican Pete
Lived down by Dead Man's Creek,
And such was their luck that they'd had no fuck
For nigh on half a week.

Oh, a moose or two, and a caribou,
And a bison cow or so,
But for Dead-Eye Dick with his kingly prick,
This fucking was mighty slow.

Dick pound on his cock with a huge piece of rock
And said, "I want to play!"
It's been almost a week at this fucking creek,
With no cunt coming my way.

So, do or dare, this horny pair
Set off for the Rio Grande,
Dead-Eye Dick with his kingly prick,
And Pete with his gun in hand.

== Origin and history ==
This is a folk poem with no known author. It is in the style of Robert Service, the writer best known for his writings of the Canadian North, in particular of his poem "The Shooting of Dan McGrew". As with all traditional poems and songs, there is variation between the texts. It was geographically widespread by 1940 or earlier; it appeared in bawdy songbooks compiled by university students in South Africa in the 1940s and is referenced by name in the novella The Mathematics of Magic, published in 1940 by authors in New York City. "The Ballad of Eskimo Nell" has been the subject of serious research and differences of interpretation have been recorded.

One often repeated misconception is that the poem was written by Noël Coward in the style of Robert Service's Yukon ballads. This is recounted by John Masters in his fiction novel By the Green of the Spring. Masters tells of a character based on Noël Coward reciting the poem in a Paris nightclub in August 1919. He includes four stanzas from the poem, which differ somewhat from those above.

Robert Conquest and John Blakeway, a British diplomat, wrote a sequel recounting the revenge of Mexican Pete.

== Nell in print and record ==
Owing to its bawdy nature, the poem has generally been passed on by word of mouth or in manuscript from one generation to another. There are few published versions.

== Nell on the internet ==
At least four versions of Eskimo Nell can be found on the internet. Of these, the last claims to be based on five distinct versions and credits the Mudcat Café.

== Nell in popular culture ==
- The True Story of Eskimo Nell is a 1975 film by Australian director Richard Franklin in which two men, Deadeye Dick and Mexico Pete, go forth in search of the famed prostitute Eskimo Nell in the Australian Outback.
- Eskimo Nell is a 1975 movie from the UK, directed by New Zealand director Martin Campbell, in which three men are enlisted by a producer to make an erotic film inspired by "The Ballad of Eskimo Nell".
- In the "Headgirl" (Motörhead and Girlschool) version of the song "Please Don't Touch", the final verse contains the line "I woke up drunk, you know I felt like Eskimo Nell."
- The poem plays a significant role in one section of The Mathematics of Magic, a 1940 novella by L. Sprague de Camp and Fletcher Pratt. Having traveled to the parallel world of Edmund Spenser's The Faerie Queene, Harold Shea and Reed Chalmer are seized by a monster, the Blatant Beast, who demands of them (on pain of death) a work of epic poetry. The only long poem which Shea knows by heart is "The Ballad of Eskimo Nell", and so he repeats it, despite the presence of a young woman, Belphebe (Spencer's Belphoebe). The Blatant Beast departs, appalled at being given a work even he would be ashamed to repeat. There are several later references to the incident, particularly relating to Belphebe's desire to have the poem explained to her. (The story was later included in The Incompleat Enchanter (and in several later collections which incorporated that book). See this bibliography of the Harold Shea stories.)

== Bibliography ==
- Sheridan, Simon (2007) Keeping the British End Up: Four Decades of Saucy Cinema, 3rd ed. Reynolds & Hearn Books
- Baker, Ronald L. (1987) "Lady Lil and Pisspot Pete". In: Journal of American Folklore 100:pp. 191–199
- Cray, Ed (1992) The Erotic Muse: American Bawdy Songs Urbana: University of Illinois Press
