= Christopher Biggins =

British actor (born 1948)

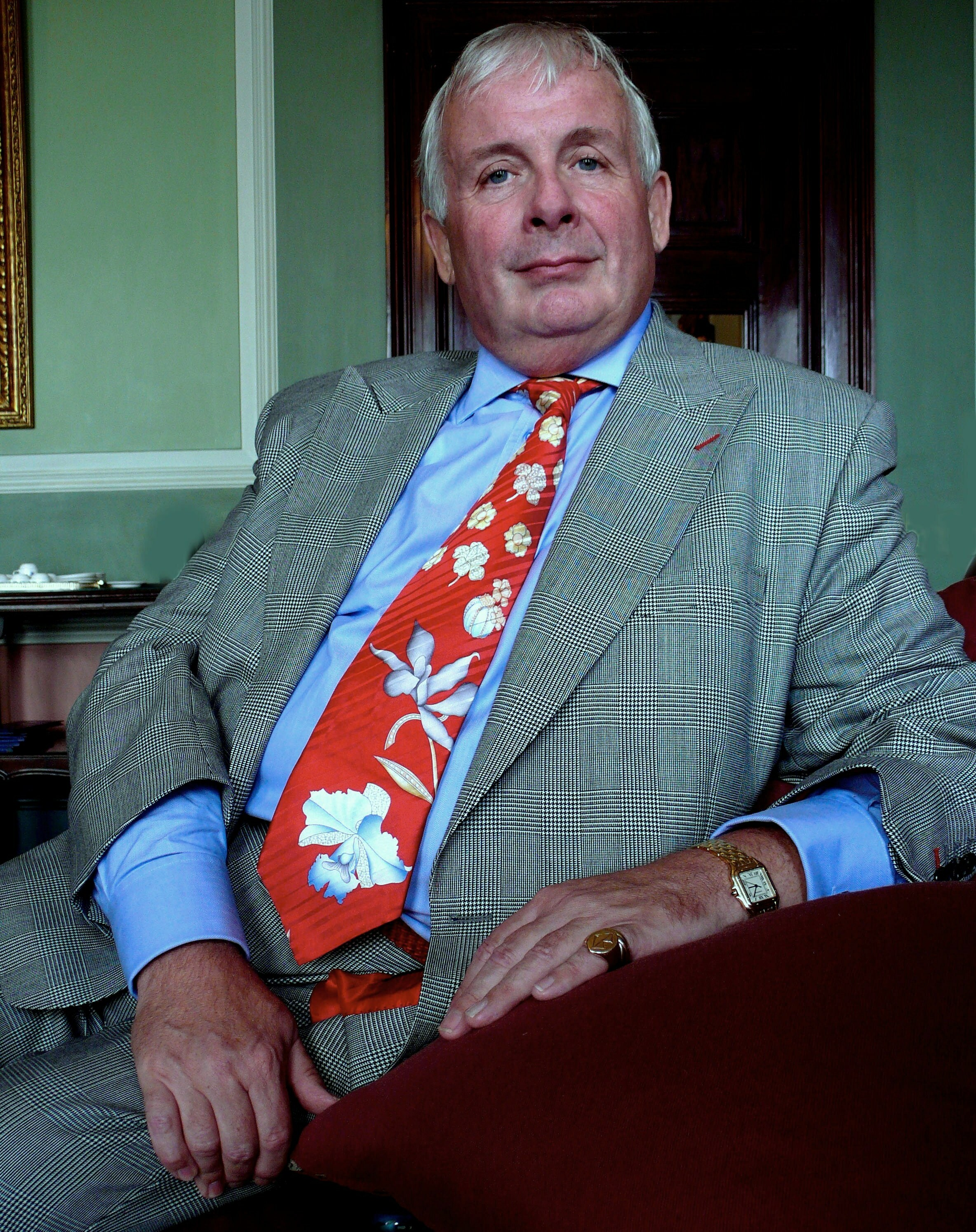
- Biggins at the Carlton Club in 2009
- Born: 16 December 1948 (age 77); Oldham, Lancashire, England
- Education: Bristol Old Vic Theatre School
- Occupations: Actor; television personality
- Years active: 1970–present
- Spouse: Beatrice Norbury (m. 1971; div. 1974)
- Partner: Neil Sinclair (c. 2006–present)

Christopher Biggins (born 16 December 1948) is an English actor and television personality. He became widely known for his roles in television series such as Porridge, Poldark and I, Claudius in the 1970s. He later became known for making frequent appearances as a celebrity on television, which included winning the 2007 series of I'm a Celebrity...Get Me Out of Here!, and has performed frequently in pantomime.

== Early life ==
Biggins was born in Oldham, Lancashire, the son of William and Pamela Biggins. He was brought up in Salisbury, Wiltshire, attended St Probus school, where he took elocution lessons, and participated in local drama groups. His first lead stage role was at the age of 17 in a Stage '65 production of Molière's Le Médecin malgré lui, leading to work with a local repertory theatre company. He also studied at the Bristol Old Vic Theatre School at the same time as Jeremy Irons.

== Career ==
=== Television ===
One of Biggins' earliest roles was on Upstairs, Downstairs in Series 2, as the character Mr. Donaldson in the episode "An Object of Value" (1972). He appeared as the regular character Lukewarm in the situation comedy Porridge (1974–1977) starring Ronnie Barker. Other comedy shows he appeared in include Whatever Happened to the Likely Lads? (1973) and Some Mothers Do 'Ave 'Em (1973, 1978).

He played the Roman emperor Nero in the BBC's version of I, Claudius (1976), dramatised from the novels by Robert Graves, having been selected for the role partly on the strength of a television commercial for Heineken in which he had played Nero presiding over the games. He appeared in the BBC's Poldark (1977) as the Reverend Osborne Whitworth, in Minder in the episode "The Bounty Hunter" (1979) and the TV miniseries Masada (1981).

On children's television, he had a regular role as department store owner Adam Painting in the children's television programme Rentaghost (1978–1983) and also played Reverend Whiting in Southern Television's Brendon Chase, produced in 1980. He had a leading role in The Phoenix and the Carpet (1997) and a supporting role as villainous antique dealer, Mr. Benger, in the Look and Read serial "Dark Towers" (1981).

Biggins' co-hosting of Surprise Surprise and hosting children's game show On Safari (1982–1984) for TVS, led to his being typecast as a "bubbly personality". He was asked in 2005 if he resented this situation replying:

No, not a bit of it. I'm perfectly happy being me, thank you, and I happen to know that I am afforded enormous respect from everybody I know. And anyway, I'm having something of a second wind now. I've reached the age [57] where all kinds of roles are opening up to me.

He was the subject of This Is Your Life in 1999, when he was surprised by Michael Aspel at the Theatre Royal, Brighton.

He appeared in The One Doctor, one of Big Finish Productions' audio dramas based on the television series Doctor Who.

In 2003, Biggins appeared in Shed Productions programme Bad Girls as himself. He featured heavily in episode seven where he was 'held hostage' by a group of prisoners protesting over the change of management in the prison. During the episode, he strikes up a relationship with many inmates, but one in particular, Buki Lester, whom he invites to live with him in episode fourteen of the same series.

He took part in the seventh series of I'm a Celebrity...Me Out of Here! in 2007. He was eventually voted the winner of the show on 30 November 2007.

He took part in an episode of Celebrity Come Dine With Me, first shown on Channel 4 on 15 February 2009. He won £1,000 for his chosen charity.

In 2009, he played himself as a pantomime director in the BBC Two sitcom Psychoville.

In 2010, he was a celebrity guest team captain on an episode of What Do Kids Know? along with Rufus Hound, Joe Swash and Sara Cox on Watch.

In May 2011, he starred in the second series of Channel 4's Celebrity Five Go to... in which the celebrities visited South Africa.

In 2013, he appeared on The Celebrity Chase, where he was the first person in the history of the show to answer all six questions correctly while going for a higher offer.

In 2014, he took part in the celebrity cookery programme Celebrity MasterChef on BBC One, and returned again in 2020, for a Christmas Special. In 2014, he took part in a celebrity edition of Catchphrase. He voices It's Not Me, It's You on Channel 5.

On 28 July 2016, Biggins entered the Celebrity Big Brother house to participate in its eighteenth series. He was chosen by the public to take part in the first secret mission. He was removed from the house on Day 9. The show's producers stated that Biggins had made "a number of comments capable of causing great offence to housemates and the viewing public". He described bisexuals as the "worst type" and suggested they were reluctant to admit they were gay. Biggins also told Katie Waissel, who is Jewish: "You better be careful or they'll be putting you in a shower and taking you to a room." Biggins later apologised, stating: "I am mortified by what's happened. I love Jewish people. I have a lot of bisexual friends and I'm not in any way a bigoted person." Forty-four people complained to Ofcom about comments Biggins made, but Ofcom ruled that he was not in breach of broadcasting rules.

=== Theatre ===
Biggins' theatre roles have included performances with the Royal Shakespeare Company, playing Herod in Jesus Christ Superstar, and 18 months at the London Palladium in the stage adaptation of Chitty Chitty Bang Bang.

In 2010, Biggins appeared as a guest star narrator in The Rocky Horror Show at various theatre venues in the United Kingdom.

==== Pantomime ====
Biggins has performed in pantomime. He has played Widow Twankey in Aladdin (in Plymouth in 2009, Grand Theatre, Wolverhampton in 2010), Buttons in Cinderella (at the Mayflower Theatre in Southampton in 2008), and the title role in Winnie the Pooh. In 2011, Biggins played the part of Mrs Crusoe in the Robinson Crusoe pantomime at the New Theatre, Cardiff and returned to the Theatre Royal, Plymouth in Dick Whittington in December 2012. In 2023 he played the Man in the Mirror in Snow White and the Seven Dwarfs at Mayflower Theatre in Southampton.

In December 2013, he was cast in the role of Dame Trot alongside Bob Carolgees in a production of Jack and the Beanstalk at New Theatre, Hull.

In 2014, he was in a production of Peter Pan as Mrs Smee in Southend, Essex.

In 2017, he received the Lifetime Achievement award at The Great British Pantomime Awards.

=== Film ===
His film roles include The Sex Thief (1973), Eskimo Nell (1975), It Could Happen to You (1975), The Rocky Horror Picture Show (1975), Adventures of a Plumber's Mate (1978), Derek Jarman's The Tempest (1979), and "The Baker" in the 1999 film Joseph and the Amazing Technicolor Dreamcoat.

In 2012, he was cast in Ray Cooney's comedy film Run for Your Wife.

=== Radio ===
In 2008, he briefly co-presented a Sunday morning radio show on BBC London with Lesley Joseph. In 2014 and 2015, Biggins covered for Liza Tarbuck on BBC Radio 2 while she was away.

In May 2017, he returned to BBC Radio 2 to cover for Paul O'Grady on his Sunday early evening programme.

=== Other work ===
Biggins hosts an annual show West End Live in London's Leicester Square.

In 2017 he recorded two songs for the album Wit & Whimsy – Songs by Alexander S. Bermange (one solo and one featuring all of the album's 23 artists).

== Personal life ==
Biggins was married to Australian actress Beatrice Norbury from 1971 to 1974. He later came out as gay and formed a civil partnership with his partner, Neil Sinclair, on 30 December 2006 at Hackney Register Office.

In March 2025, Biggins said that he had undergone surgery for a heart condition. He also said he had recovered from skin cancer.

=== Political views ===
Biggins has expressed his admiration for former Conservative Prime Minister Margaret Thatcher. He wrote in his autobiography that he cried on the day she resigned, saying: "I'm not the most political of people. But I believe in self-reliance and getting on with the job in hand. Margaret had seemed to personify all that. And she had star quality, which of course I loved." In May 2014, he said: "I loved John Major, he was charismatic and charming. I've always been a Conservative, though I would have voted for John Smith. I hope we have a new Conservative leader making his way to the top now. We need a new man."

== Filmography ==
- 1973: The Sex Thief as Lord 'Porky' Prescott
- 1975: The Rocky Horror Picture Show as A Transylvanian
- 1976: I, Claudius as Nero
- 1978: Adventures of a Plumber's Mate as Robin
- 1979: The Tempest as Stephano, a drunken mariner
- 1994: Decadence as The Entourage #1
- 1999: Joseph and the Amazing Technicolor Dreamcoat as The Baker
- 2000: Circus as Arnie
- 2001: Blow Dry as President of the British Hair Federation (uncredited)
- 2001: Cold Fish as Roland 'The Agent'
- 2007: I’m A Celebrity...Get Me Out Of Here! as Winner
- 2012: Run for Your Wife as Bobby Franklin

== Voice in animated films ==
- 1994: Asterix Conquers America as Lucullus (Original version)

== Voice in TV specials ==
- 2007: How To Marry a Prince as Narrator

Preceded by Matt Willis (2006)	I'm A Celebrity, Get Me Out Of Here! Winner & King of the Jungle; 2007	Succeeded by Joe Swash (2008)
