= Terence Edmond =

British actor (1939–2009)

- Born: Terence Edmond Stutter; 22 November 1939; Bristol, England
- Died: 14 March 2009 (aged 69); England
- Years active: 1960–1994
- Spouse: Carole Naylor (m. 1963; div. 1969)

Terence Edmond Stutter (22 November 1939 – 14 March 2009) was an English actor, who played PC Ian Sweet in 78 episodes of Z-Cars between 1962 and 1964.

His popular TV character was killed off in an episode of the police drama transmitted live in 1964 to the shock of his many fans. The fictional PC drowned after an heroic but ill-advised attempt to save a young boy.

Edmond was a stalwart of the BBC Radio 4 Drama Repertory Company from the 1970s right up to his death, appearing in dramatisations of many classic works of literature in a variety of character parts. He also appeared in the 1980s BBC sitcom Dear John, playing Ken Shelton, the colleague and best friend of lead character, John Lacey.

== Selected filmography ==
- The League of Gentlemen (1960)
- The Mind Benders (1963)
- Murder Ahoy! (1964)
- The Mini-Affair (1967)
- The Sex Thief (1973)
- Eskimo Nell (1975)

== Death ==
Edmond died on 14 March 2009 from bronchiectasis, at the age of 69. He had suffered from the lung condition since childhood. In 2005 he spoke out about hospital cleaning regimes after contracting an infection – pseudomonas aeruginosa – while undergoing surgery on a broken leg.
