= Doomwatch (film) =

1972 film by Peter Sasdy

- Directed by: Peter Sasdy
- Written by: Clive Exton; Television series: Gerry Davis; Kit Pedler
- Produced by: Tony Tenser
- Starring: Ian Bannen; Judy Geeson; John Paul; Simon Oates; Jean Trend; Joby Blanshard
- Cinematography: Kenneth Talbot
- Edited by: Keith Palmer
- Music by: John Scott
- Production company: Tigon British Film Productions
- Distributed by: Tigon Film Distributors; Embassy Pictures (US)
- Release date: March 1972
- Running time: 92 minutes
- Country: United Kingdom
- Language: English

Doomwatch (U.S. title: Island of the Ghouls) is a 1972 British science fiction film directed by Peter Sasdy and starring Ian Bannen, Judy Geeson and John Paul. Described as both a thriller and a horror film, it is based on the BBC television series Doomwatch (1970–1972). The screenplay was written by Clive Exton. In the United States it was released by Embassy Pictures.

Waters surrounding an island become contaminated by chemical dumping, and people who eat fish caught in those waters become deformed and violent.

== Plot ==
An outsider visits a remote isolated village that has seemingly shunned modern life. Dr. Del Shaw, an investigator from the British ecological watchdog group nicknamed Doomwatch, is sent to the island of Balfe to file a report on the effects of a recent oil tanker spillage. He becomes fascinated with the mysterious behavioural disorders of the locals who display rudeness and random aggression and a strange genetic prevalence of thick lips and sloping brows. Investigation shows that the villagers have been suffering over a prolonged period from hormonal disorders, which are being caused by leaking drums of growth stimulants that have been dumped offshore. The islanders have been eating contaminated fish and develop a disorder of excessive hormonal growth, which produces aggression and eventually madness, attributed to a form of acromegaly. Rather than seek help from the mainland, they hide those who are deformed from any newcomers.

== Cast ==
- Ian Bannen as Dr. Del Shaw
- Judy Geeson as Victoria Brown
- John Paul as Dr. Spencer Quist
- Simon Oates as Dr. John Ridge
- Jean Trend as Dr. Fay Chantry
- Joby Blanshard as Colin Bradley
- George Sanders as The Admiral
- Percy Herbert as PC Hartwell
- Shelagh Fraser as Mrs. Betty Straker
- Geoffrey Keen as Sir Henry Leyton
- Joseph O'Conor as Vicar
- Norman Bird as Brewer
- Constance Chapman as Miss Johnson
- Michael Brennan as Tom Straker
- James Cosmo as Bob Gillette

== Production ==
The film was made at Pinewood Studios and location shooting took place around Polkerris, Mevagissey and Polperro and Chapel Porth in Cornwall, as well as the London Heliport in Battersea. The sets were designed by the art director Colin Grimes.

== Critical reception ==
The Monthly Film Bulletin wrote, "After a promising opening [...] the weak, science-based story-line is embellished by Gothic horror elements which serve only to vitiate the authenticity that was the chief strength of the otherwise glossy TV series. To inject excitement and suspense into the film, Sasdy relies on Hammer film clichés [...] Nor is the film helped by the importation of two stars and the relegation of the original Doomwatch team to minor roles. The Gothic exaggerations and the scientific revelations never really cohere, and for all the topicality of the plot, Sasdy's film proves equally unconvincing as ecological exposé or contemporary horror show."

In a retrospective review for Radio Times, Tom Hutchinson awarded the film two stars out of five, writing "this mystery thriller crash-landed unhappily in the swamp of horror instead of on the firmer ground of science fact or fiction [...] It's risibly alarmist, certainly, but the environmental dangers it pinpoints are only too topical." Halliwell's Film Guide described it as "an unsatisfactory horror film".
