= Robert Wynne-Simmons =

British director, screenwriter (born 1947)

- Born: 18 August 1947 (age 77)
- Era: Contemporary

Robert Anthony Wynne-Simmons (born 18 August 1947) is a British composer, film director and screenwriter.

== Early life and education ==
Wynne-Simmons began to make films and write plays, poetry and music while still at school. He attended Lancing College in Sussex, England.

In 1966, he attended Peterhouse, Cambridge, where he received an M.A. in English Literature. The college funded the making of The Judgment of Albion, a film based on the prophetic writings of William Blake, voiced by Anthony Quayle and Donald Sinden. A copy is now with the British Film Institute.

== Career and written works ==
In 1970, he wrote the screenplay for Blood on Satan's Claw. (Directed by Piers Haggard)

He subsequently worked for the BBC as a film editor, and was a graduate of the NFTS in Beaconsfield (1975). In 1978, he worked for RTÉ in Dublin, where he directed Double Piquet, in 1979.

In 1981–2, he wrote and directed The Outcasts. The actor Cyril Cusack appeared in both. Also in The Outcasts were Mick Lally and Mary Ryan, who won the prize for Best Actress in the San Remo Festival in 1984, where the film won Best First Feature. The film also won prizes in the Oporto film festival, Brussels Fantasy film festival, and in Geneva.

After a brief period directing for The Book Tower, a children's TV series made by Yorkshire Television, he returned to Ireland to direct and write for the group of T.V. dramas known as When Reason Sleeps, made by Strongbow Productions, RTÉ and Channel 4. In 1992, his short film Scherzo was shown at the Venice Biennale, the Chicago Film Festival and the San Francisco Festival, where it was awarded four stars.

In 2006, he returned as a writer to the stage, with The Deluge, a play based on the short stories of Karen Blixen, which he directed at the Edinburgh festival that year with Susannah York in the leading role. In 2007, his monologue "Kurtz" was performed with The Deluge at the New End Theatre, Hampstead.

== Personal life ==
Wynne-Simmons lives and works in Oppenheim, Germany.
