= Michael Byrne (actor) =

British actor (1939–2026)

- Byrne as Ernst Vogel in Indiana Jones and the Last Crusade
- Born: 7 November 1939; London, England
- Died: 20 June 2026 (aged 86)
- Occupation: Actor
- Years active: 1962–2022

Michael Byrne (7 November 1939 – 20 June 2026) was a British actor known for his roles in the National Theatre, Hollywood films, and television shows. During his career he performed a wide variety of roles that included several films in which he played German military roles.

== Early life and education ==
Byrne was born in London, England on 7 November 1939, to Helen Byrne of Kilkenny, Ireland, a single mother. While Byrne’s agent has told The New York Times that the actor was born in 1939, there are other sources that state he was born in 1943.

He was educated at a school in Burgess Hill. He then went on to receive training at the Royal Central School of Speech and Drama with financial support from the Freud Institute.

== Career ==
Byrne began appearing in films in the 1960s but rose to prominence from the 1970s onwards. In 1972, he played Edward Seymour, 1st Duke of Somerset in the historical drama film Henry VIII and His Six Wives. In 1976 he played the German NCO Feldwebel Karl Hofer in the film The Eagle Has Landed. Byrne appeared in the role of Lieutenant-Colonel Giles Vandeleur in the 1977 film A Bridge Too Far. In 1978, he played Major Schroeder in Force 10 from Navarone and Paul Vercors, the Communist Resistance leader in Secret Army.

In 1989, he played Colonel Vogel in Indiana Jones and the Last Crusade.

In 1995, he acted in the film Braveheart appearing to audiences as Smythe, a soldier who attempts to rape William Wallace's wife and first inspires Wallace to seek independence from England. In 1997, Byrne played the role of Royal Navy Admiral Kelly, in command of a British task force on HMS Bedford in the James Bond film Tomorrow Never Dies. In 1998, Byrne appeared as a Jewish concentration camp survivor who is instrumental in the capture of a Nazi war criminal (played by Sir Ian McKellen) in the film Apt Pupil.

His other film credits include Butley, The Medusa Touch, The Saint, The Good Father, The Sum of All Fears, Gangs of New York and Mortdecai. He has also played Reinhard Beck in The Scarlet and the Black and General Olbricht in The Plot to Kill Hitler. He was also the SS interrogator in Rogue Male.

On television, he appeared in Thriller, Tales of the Unexpected, The Professionals, The Devil's Crown, Smiley's People as Peter Guillam, Yes, Prime Minister, Lord Mountbatten: The Last Viceroy, Between The Lines, Sharpe, Hornblower, A Touch of Frost (the episode "Quarry", in which he played the father of Allie Byrne, his real-life daughter), Agatha Raisin (Hell's Bells), Midsomer Murders (the episode "The Ghost of Causton Abbey"), The Mists of Avalon, Waking the Dead, The Body Farm, Honest, Hamish Macbeth, and Casualty.

From April 2008 to January 2010, Byrne starred in Coronation Street, as Ted Page, Gail Platt's long-lost father and the ex-lover of Audrey Roberts.

He also appeared in the 2010 film Harry Potter and the Deathly Hallows Part 1 as Gellert Grindelwald, a powerful wizard that had been defeated by Dumbledore and was imprisoned at Nurmengard, the prison he built for his own enemies.

Byrne played Alfred Maxwell in BBC's Casualty, a terminally ill man with motor neuron disease who forms a friendship with clinical lead Connie Beauchamp.

He played Bruce Titchener in The Archers.

=== Theatre ===
Byrne was a long-established stage actor, having joined the National Theatre in 1964 and appearing in many seasons subsequently. He also appeared on stage throughout the world. He had numerous theatre credits to his name including: Roberto Miranda in Death and the Maiden at the Royal Court, Maskwell in The Double Dealer and Claudio in Much Ado About Nothing at the National Theatre, Reg in Butley at The Criterion, and also The Cherry Orchard, The Seagull, Romeo and Juliet, Mayor of Zalamea, All My Sons, Lulu, Faith Healer, Duchess of Malfi, A Slight Ache, and Molly Sweeney amongst many others. Byrne appeared at the Edinburgh Festival in State of Play, written by Zia Trench.

In 2010, he played Romeo to Siân Phillips's Juliet at the Bristol Old Vic theatre. In 2018, he played Talbot in Schiller's Mary Stuart at the Duke of York's Theatre. The following year, he played Alexander Serebryakov in Uncle Vanya at the Theatre Royal, Bath.

== Personal life and death ==
In 1965, he married Carole Nimmons, but they later separated. They had met in 1962 in Ireland, during a performing theatre tour. The couple had two daughters, Tara and Bryony. In later life, Byrne was in a relationship with Sara Sugarman.

Byrne died on 20 June 2026, aged 86.

== Filmography ==
Year	Title	Role
1963	The Scarlet Blade	Lt. Hawke
1963	The Silent Playground	Roger
1969	The Image	the artist
1972	Henry VIII and His Six Wives	Edward Seymour, 1st Duke of Somerset
1974	Butley	Reg Nuttall
1974	Vampyres	Playboy
1975	Conduct Unbecoming	2nd Lt. Toby Strang
1976	The Omen	Monk
1976	The Eagle Has Landed	Karl
1977	A Bridge Too Far	Giles Vandeleur
1977	Telefon	Soviet Military Officer
1978	The Medusa Touch	Sgt. Duff
1978	Force 10 from Navarone	Maj. Schroeder
1978	Secret Army	Paul Vercors, Communist Resistance leader
1981	Lady Killers	Edward Marshall Hall
1983	The Scarlet and the Black	Reinhard Beck
1984	Champions	Richard Hussey
1985	The Good Father	Leonard Scruby
1986	Oedipus the King	Chorus
1988	Buster	Poyser
1988	Saracen	Colonel Patrick Ansell
1989	Indiana Jones and the Last Crusade	Ernst Vogel
1994	Nostradamus	Inquisitor
1994	Sharpe	Major Nairn
1995	Braveheart	Smythe
1996	Kavanagh QC	Judge Ransome
1997	The Saint	Yuri Vereshagin
1997	The Island on Bird Street	Bolek
1997	Tomorrow Never Dies	Admiral Kelly
1998	Gunshy	Lange
1998	This Is My Father	Michael Finnegan
1998	Apt Pupil	Ben Kramer
1998	Hornblower, The Even Chance	Captain Keene
1998	Heat of the Sun	Ronald Burkitt
1999	Mauá: The Emperor and the King	Richard Carruthers
2000	Battlefield Earth	Parson Staffer
2000	Proof of Life	Lord Luthan
2001	The Musketeer	Treville
2002	The Sum of All Fears	Anatoli Grushkov
2002	Gangs of New York	Horace Greeley
2002	Sunday	Lord Widgery
2004	Beyond the Sea	Dr. Andretti
2009	Blood: The Last Vampire	Elder
2010	Harry Potter and the Deathly Hallows – Part 1	Gellert Grindelwald
2012	Outpost: Black Sun	Neurath
2012	Quartet	Frank White
2013	Diana	Christiaan Barnard
2014	The First Line	Richard
2015	Mortdecai	The Duke
2016	Wallander, "The Troubled Man" (TV episode) The Living and the Dead (Ep.2) (BBC)	Ola Vilkander Ebenezer Alsop
2018	The Last Witness	Coroner
2018	Intrigo: Death of an Author	Keller
2022	Strike	Roy Phipps
