= The True Story of Eskimo Nell =

- VHS cover
- Directed by: Richard Franklin
- Written by: Richard Franklin; Alan Hopgood
- Based on: The Ballad of Eskimo Nell
- Produced by: Richard Franklin; Ron Baneth
- Starring: Max Gillies; Serge Lazareff; Butcher Vachon
- Cinematography: Vince Monton
- Edited by: Andrew London
- Music by: Brian May
- Production companies: Quest Films; Filmways Australasian Distributors; Australian Film Development Corporation
- Distributed by: Filmways Australasian Distributors
- Release dates: 27 March 1975 (Melbourne); June 1975 (Sydney)
- Running time: 103 minutes (original cut); 94 mins (Sydney)
- Country: Australia
- Language: English
- Budget: A$200,000

The True Story of Eskimo Nell (retitled Dick Down Under in the United Kingdom) is a 1975 Australian Western comedy film produced, directed, and written by Richard Franklin, and starring Max Gillies as Deadeye Dick and Serge Lazareff as Mexico Pete. This was the first film produced by Richard Franklin.

Based on and inspired by the bawdy Ballad of Eskimo Nell, which had actually been banned in Australia, with Deadeye Dick and Mexico Pete setting forth through the Australian Outback in search of the infamous prostitute, Eskimo Nell.

The film features large amounts of full frontal nudity which was one of the main attractions of the film at the time.

The film was part of the Australian New Wave, with most of the film being shot in Ballarat and some in Canada.

== Plot ==
The film's unlikely protagonist is a mild-mannered window peeper named Dead-Eye Dick (Max Gillies). Dick spies on a Mexican couple. The husband is very jealous and is about to discover that his wife has a lover when Dick rescues the lover, whose moniker is Mexico Pete (Serge Lazareff). The worldly Pete counsels the shy Dick on his problems approaching women. Dick claims that he is waiting for an Alaskan Eskimo named Nell. Pete and Dick decide to travel to Alaska to find this fantasy woman, and they have several wacky misadventures along the way.

== Cast ==
- Max Gillies as Deadeye Dick
- Serge Lazareff as Mexico Pete
- Butcher Vachon as The Alaskan Kid (as Paul Vachon)
- Jerry Thomas as The Sprunker
- Kurt Beimel as Waldo the Great
- Abigail as Esmerelda
- Kris McQuade as Lil
- Elli Maclure as Elli
- Grahame Bond as Bogger
- Max Fairchild as Posthole Jack
- Tony Bazell as Prof. Brayshaw (as Anthony Bazell)
- Ernie Bourne as Barman
- Paddy Madden as The Real Eskimo Nell
- Victoria Anoux as The Dream Eskimo Nell
- Elke Neidhardt

== Development ==
Franklin says he got the idea to make the film when he was in Sydney producing The Jumping Jeweller of Lavender Bay and heard a tape recorded version of the poem Eskimo Nell. He thought it would make a great movie and several months later wrote a treatment.

The movie became known as a sex comedy but Franklin says it was never his intention to make that sort of movie. He was more interested in exploring a male friendship along the lines of Midnight Cowboy (1969) with elements of comic Westerns like Cat Ballou (1965). He wrote a draft of the script which was set in the same locations as the poem, the Rio Grande and Alaska, and took it to Hollywood in 1972. However he encountered resistance from Hollywood agents, who believed "no one wants cold scripts", referring to the box office disappointment of movies like Ice Palace (1960) and Ice Station Zebra (1968). He also discovered that the poem was not well known in the US. "It's known only in the 'English World', meaning Canada, Australia and England," said the director.

Franklin returned home, then realised he could set the story just as easily in the Australian goldfields:

There was the desire to assert the Australian vernacular and thereby have a bit of lavatory humour in it, but at the same time I think, as opposed to Alvin and Barry McKenzie, to give a sense of our culture and history in terms of mateship. But basically it was designed to shock and, in retrospect, it's probably a bit tame.

Franklin pitched the idea of the film to the Australian Film Development Corporation who at first rejected it, but then he re-pitched the project with a series of stills he had taken at Sovereign Hill. They gave him some development money and put him in contact with screenwriter Alan Hopgood. According to Franklin, Hopgood mostly concentrated on the dialogue, while Franklin worked on structure. The AFDC were impressed by the second draft and agreed to help finance.

== Production ==
Eventually the AFDC provided $105,000, with additional funds from the distributor Filmways and some private investment.

Franklin had been impressed by the segment "The Family Man" in the film Libido (1973) and wanted that film's stars, Max Gillies and Jack Thompson, to play the leads. Gillies accepted but Thompson was not available so Serge Lazareff was cast instead.

The film was shot in mid 1974 in rural Victoria, including Sovereign Hill and in an improvised studio in the Exhibition Building, Melbourne. A smaller unit shot some additional footage in Canada, including a scene involving pursuit on ice floes which was a homage to Way Down East. Most of this sequence was re-shot in Melbourne.

== Release ==
The film received much criticism from conservative groups such as the Festival of Light who claimed that government funds were being used to produce pornography. Franklin:

The theatres were picketed, and it was actually fairly successful in terms of damaging the picture. I thought it would be great publicity, but the one thing people don't want to hear is that tax dollars have been wasted. The minute they hear that, they're less inclined to throw good money after bad, if you see what I mean. So the film was not successful.

A British film based on the same poem, Eskimo Nell, was made around the same time. Its release in Australia was delayed until 1976 and its title changed to The Sexy Saga of Naughty Nell and Big Dick.

The movie was not a commercial success, despite being recut for its Sydney release and helped lead to the demise of the Australian "ocker sex comedy" cycle. "It was an attempt to do something kind of poignant," says Franklin. "In retrospect it probably should have been funnier than it was." However Antony I. Ginnane worked on the overseas marketing of the film, starting his relationship with Richard Franklin.

Richard Franklin admitted the film changed what sort of films he made:

One of the great disappointments for me, and I learned a lot from it, was showing it to my American friends - probably at the time we were there making Fantasm - and discovering they just didn't get the humour. That it was a kind of humour that didn't really travel well. They admired the filmmaking, they admired the craft, but they didn't laugh at any of the jokes. So the pathos and so on, which was really derived spiritually for me from Midnight Cowboy, worked, but not the comedy. And so my next film, using a lot of the same financiers, was an attempt to make a universal genre film.

== Home media ==
The True Story of Eskimo Nell was released for the first time on DVD by Umbrella Entertainment in March 2004.

Title	Format	Episodes	Discs/Tapes	Region 4 (Australia)	Special features	Distributors
The True Story of Eskimo Nell	DVD	Film	1	17 March 2004	The True Story of The True Story of Eskimo Nell Original Film Trailer Photo Gallery Trailer for other Titles	Umbrella Entertainment
The True Story of Eskimo Nell	Streaming	Film	Vimeo.com	17 March 2004	None	Umbrella Entertainment

== See also ==
- Cinema of Australia
