= The Haunted House of Horror =

1969 British film by Michael Armstrong

- Directed by: Michael Armstrong
- Screenplay by: Michael Armstrong; Gerry Levy (as "Peter Marcus")
- Produced by: Tony Tenser
- Starring: Frankie Avalon; Jill Haworth; Dennis Price
- Cinematography: Jack Atcheler
- Edited by: Peter Pitt
- Music by: Reg Tilsley
- Production companies: Tigon British Film Productions; American International Pictures
- Distributed by: Tigon (UK); AIP (USA)
- Release date: July 1969 (UK)
- Running time: 92 min
- Country: United Kingdom
- Language: English
- Budget: £80,000

The Haunted House of Horror (also known as Horror House and The Dark) is a 1969 British horror film directed by Michael Armstrong and starring Frankie Avalon and Jill Haworth. it was written by Armstrong and Gerry Levy (as Peter Marcus). Young adults look for a thrill by spending the night in an old mansion in the English countryside. The film's tagline was "Behind its forbidden doors an evil secret hides!"

== Plot ==
In Swinging London, a group of twenty-something friends are attending a rather dull party, and they decide to gather for kicks at an old, supposedly haunted mansion where one of their number used to play as a child. Among the group is American ringleader Chris, his bored girlfriend Sheila, promiscuous Sylvia (who has her eye on handsome two-timing Gary) and his "good girl" date, Dorothy. Also tagging along are nervous, heavy-set Madge, her sarcastic, hot-tempered boyfriend Peter, sweet-faced Richard and his friend Henry. They are all followed by Paul Kellet, Sylvia's older, jealous and married ex-boyfriend.

They have fun exploring the mansion, even holding a séance before separating one by one by candlelight on the moonlit night. Sylvia, frightened by the mansion, leaves and hitchhikes toward home, but Kellet hangs behind at the mansion. While all the partiers are alone, Gary is brutally knifed and his body is discovered by the panic-stricken Dorothy and the others. Because some of them have a criminal record, Chris convinces the group to leave Gary's body far from the home and to pretend that Gary left and that no one knows where he went. They are all shaken by Chris' assertion that one of them must be the murderer.

During the next few weeks, the survivors are possessed by tension and guilt, and after Gary is reported missing, they are further shaken by questioning from the police. Kellet confronts Sylvia, learning that she may have lost a lighter that could link them to the mansion. He returns there but is also killed.

Dorothy calls the survivors together to ask to confess. However, Chris convinces them to return to the house to discover who among them is the killer before they all succumb to a gruesome death. Meanwhile, Sylvia is visited by the police again, and she discloses the location of the house after learning of Kellet's disappearance. At the mansion, Dorothy becomes hysterical, prompting several of the group to depart, leaving just Chris, Sheila and Richard. While Sheila is out of the room, Richard recounts how he was locked in a basement for three days as a child and tells that he has a paralyzing fear of the dark. Despite Chris' efforts, he is also knifed and Sheila is frantically chased around the mansion. Just as Richard is about to strike, the moon goes behind a cloud, bringing about his reversion to childhood and fear of the dark, thus saving Sheila as the police arrive.

== Cast ==
- Frankie Avalon as Chris
- Jill Haworth as Sheila
- Dennis Price as Inspector Bill Bradley
- Mark Wynter as Gary Scott
- George Sewell as Bob Kellett
- Gina Warwick as Sylvia
- Richard O'Sullivan as Peter
- Carol Dilworth as Dorothy
- Julian Barnes as Richard
- Veronica Doran as Madge
- Robin Stewart as Henry
- Jan Holden as Peggy
- Clifford Earl as Police Sergeant Pelley
- Robert Raglan as John Bradley
- Nicholas Young as party guest

== Production ==
Michael Armstrong wrote the screenplay, originally entitled The Dark, in 1960 at the age of 15. He rewrote the script in 1967, "further developing its darker psycho-sexual themes and sharpening characters and dialogue to reflect the current cynical underbelly beneath the superficial Sixties culture." He also added the character of Richard, to be played by David Bowie. Armstrong showed it to John Trevelyan, who recommended it to Tony Tenser of Tigon Films. Tenser set up the film with American International Pictures (AIP), which wanted it made in England, where it was cheaper to film than in the U.S.

AIP insisted that a role be written for Boris Karloff, so Armstrong created the role of a detective who used a wheelchair. However, Karloff was too ill to play the part and Dennis Price took the role instead. AIP also insisted that the two lead characters be played by American actors and that more sex scenes should be added.

Armstrong wanted the lead role of Chris to be played by Ian Ogilvy. However, AIP insisted that either Fabian or Frankie Avalon, both of whom were under contract to AIP, play the part. Armstrong wanted Jane Merrow to play the female lead, but Louis Hewyard of AIP wanted Sue Lyon or Carol Lynley. Jill Haworth was eventually cast. Armstrong originally wrote the part of Richard for Peter McEnery but later rewrote it for David Bowie; he was so keen on Bowie that he wrote a number of cabaret scenes in early drafts specifically for him. However, once Avalon was cast, it was feared that Bowie would clash with him. Bowie was replaced by Noel Janus, but objections led to him being replaced with Julian Barnes (who had originally been cast as Henry).

Heyward wrote additional scenes for the film, to the dismay of Armstrong. Tenser tried to arrange for both Armstrong's and Heyward's versions to be made, but there was not enough money, so a fourth draft was written that cobbled together all the drafts.

=== Shooting ===
Exterior scenes were shot at Bank Hall in Bretherton and the Birkdale Palace Hotel, Southport; other locations included Carnaby Street, London and Grim's Dyke, Harrow.

Sam Arkoff and James Nicholson of AIP hated the original cut that included Heyward's scenes and requested new scenes. Armstrong wrote the new scenes and handed them to line producer Gerry Levy, but Levy ignored Armstrong's scenes and wrote his own additional material, including a romance between Gina Warwick and a new character played by George Sewell. Levy also added two additional killings, a musical number in the opening scene and a revised closing exposition.

Armstrong says that among the scenes missing in the final cut of the film were a love story between Gary and Sylvia, "twisted sexual meanderings of the characters," satire of the youth scene and a homosexual subplot.

== Release ==
The film opened in the United States on April 15, 1970 where it had a showcase release in 17 theaters in Los Angeles. It grossed $145,000 ranking 16th at the US box office and was on a double bill with The Crimson Cult at the Fox Theatre in St. Louis, and the Michigan Theatre in Detroit, where it grossed a combined $18,000 in the first week.

== Reception ==
=== Box office ===
The film's box-office performance was reasonable.

=== Critical response ===
==== Contemporary ====
Variety wrote, "As long as he stays in the house, director Michael Armstrong keeps things tense and scary enough, but things look a little silly in the daylight ... All the tension dissipates when the knife-wielding maniac proves just another mixed-up kid rather than anything really spooky. At that, a ghost might have been more believable than Barnes' big scene at the end."

Kevin Thomas of the Los Angeles Times reviewed the film jointly with The Crimson Cult and found them both to be "enjoyable British horror pictures ... that transcend their formula plots through exceptional scripting, efficient direction and intelligent performances."

The Monthly Film Bulletin wrote that the story "strains credulity even for a thriller and is elongated to breaking point," concluding, "The shock sequences are reasonably well contrived and there is a liberal flow of blood, but this haunted house is more likely to induce sleep than nightmare."

Howard Thompson of The New York Times called the film an "atrocious hack-'em-up bundle."

==== Retrospective ====
Assigning the film 3 stars, Film Authority calls the film an "interesting product of its time", and while not "Gothic or sinister, it wields the slasher clichés with surprising skill, and has an odd, lurid energy that make it watchable."

Filmink wrote "Avalon’s casting doesn’t work – too American, too old, too broad – but the movie does have a cult and some interesting touches."
