= The Sex Thief =

1973 film by Martin Campbell

- Directed by: Martin Campbell
- Written by: Michael Armstrong; Tudor Gates
- Produced by: Tudor Gates
- Starring: David Warbeck; Diane Keen; Christopher Biggins
- Cinematography: Grenville Middleton
- Edited by: Peter Musgrave
- Music by: Mike Vickers
- Distributed by: LMG
- Release date: July 1973
- Running time: 89 minutes
- Country: United Kingdom
- Language: English

The Sex Thief, released in the United States as Her Family Jewels and in the Netherlands as Handful of Diamonds, is a 1973 British sex comedy film directed by Martin Campbell and starring David Warbeck, Diane Keen and Christopher Biggins. The film was written by Tudor Gates and Michael Armstrong under the joint name Edward Hyde.

== Plot ==
Grant Henry, a writer of trashy paperbacks like The Dirty and the Dying, moonlights as a masked jewel thief who is usually caught in the act but is able to get away with his crimes by luring his female victims to bed. After these women lie to the police about the thief's identity ("who could disguise himself as a clubfooted coloured midget one week and a 6′6″ Russian with a harelip the next") and seem to want to get burgled again, the Inspector in charge of the case and an insurance investigator trained in kung fu decide to lay a trap for the thief.

== Cast ==
- David Warbeck as Grant Henry
- Diane Keen as Judy Marvin
- Terence Edmond as Insp. Robert Smith
- Deirdre Costello as Jezebel Lorraine (as Linda Coombes)
- Michael Armstrong as Sgt. Plinth
- Christopher Neil as Guy Hammond
- Jennifer Westbrook as Emily Barrow (as Jenny Westbrook)
- Harvey Hall as Jacobi
- Christopher Biggins as Lord 'Porky' Prescott
- Christopher Mitchell as Ian Wensleydale
- Eric Deacon as Crabshaw

== Production ==
Keen, quoted in the book The Worlds Greatest Scandals of the 20th Century, claimed: "Times were pretty hard and this is a comedy which I am not ashamed at having made. But it was bought by a company, which drafted in other actresses to make it look like I was doing erotic things from start to finish. It became incredibly filthy."

== Releases ==
The Sex Thief was heavily cut by the British Board of Film Censors on its original release; cuts were made to the scene where the naked girl dances in front of Grant, and the inter-cutting between a further sex scene and a wrestling match. The film's speeded-up sex scene was ‘considerably reduced’, as was the scene where a handcuffed Grant is seduced by Judy. The current US and UK DVD releases are uncut. The US Her Family Jewels/Handful of Diamonds version runs approximately 81 minutes (as opposed to the original 89-minute running time) and adds hardcore inserts to every sex scene and also to a scene where the characters played by Terence Edmond and Diane Keen discuss the thief in a crowded pub, in which the hardcore inserts imply the two characters are masturbating each other under the table. Her Family Jewels deletes several narrative scenes that appear in the original version of the film – most notably the end credits and a subplot involving two detectives trying to sell pornographic films – but adds several newly shot hardcore scenes, in which footage of David Warbeck (taken from elsewhere in the film) has been briefly inserted. These scenes are scored to the pop song "Well Here I Go", which does not appear in the original film.

The hardcore version was later released on video in The Netherlands (under the name Handful of Diamonds).

== Appearance in Texas murder trial ==
The film appeared as incriminating evidence in the 1987 trial against Michael Morton, wrongly convicted of murdering his wife. The first two minutes of the film were shown to the jury, in an effort to make them negatively disposed to Morton.

== Critical reception ==
The Monthly Film Bulletin wrote: "A smoother than average British sex comedy, The Sex Thief makes resourceful use of its low budget and fifteen-day schedule, and its leading trio – David Warbeck, Diane Keen and Terence Edmond – turn in personable performances. Unfortunately, the film's stylistic mishmash of arch parody ("This is madness!"), blue humour and smooth-talking cross-chat results in only one really delightful moment, when to its owners' dismay a suitcase full of pornographic film explodes its contents into the middle of the road. The frequent sex frolics (one bout intercut with a wrestling match; another ornamented by the use of a vibrator) are conceived less extravagantly than usual."
