= Orbital discography =

- Studio albums: 10
- Extended plays: 5
- Soundtrack albums: 4
- Live albums: 3
- Compilation albums: 7
- Singles: 40

The discography of the electronic dance music duo Orbital consists of ten studio albums, four original score albums, three live/session albums, seven compilation albums, two DJ-mix albums, five extended plays, and forty singles.

== Albums ==
=== Studio albums ===
Title	Album details	Chart positions						Certifications (sales thresholds)
Title	Album details	UK	AUS	BEL (FL)	US	US Elec.	US Heat.	Certifications (sales thresholds)
Orbital	Released: 30 September 1991; Label: FFRR, Polydor K.K., Internal; Format: CD, cassette, vinyl	31	–	–	–	–	–	BPI: Silver
Orbital	Released: 24 May 1993; Labels: FFRR, Polydor K.K., Internal; Format: CD, cassette, vinyl	13	–	117	–	–	–	BPI: Silver
Snivilisation	Released: 8 August 1994; Labels: FFRR, Polydor K.K., Internal; Format: CD, cassette, vinyl	4	190	–	–	–	–	BPI: Silver
In Sides	Released: 29 April 1996; Labels: FFRR, Polydor K.K., Internal; Format: CD, cassette, vinyl	5	–	–	–	–	47	BPI: Gold
The Middle of Nowhere	Released: 5 April 1999; Labels: FFRR, Polydor K.K.; Format: CD, cassette, vinyl	4	113	38	191	–	11	BPI: Silver
The Altogether	Released: 30 April 2001; Labels: FFRR, EastWest Japan; Format: CD, cassette, DVD	11	50	–	–	8	24	BPI: Silver
Blue Album	Released: 21 June 2004; Label: Orbital Music; Format: CD, vinyl	44	–	–	–	9	–	
Wonky	Released: 2 April 2012; Label: Orbital Music; Format: CD, vinyl, digital download	22	186	44	–	–	–	
Monsters Exist	Released: 14 September 2018; Label: ACP; Format: CD, vinyl, digital download	12	–	143	–	24	9	
Optical Delusion	Released: 17 February 2023; Label: Orbital Recordings; Format: CD, vinyl, digital download	6	–	70	–	–	–	

=== Soundtrack albums ===
Title	Album details	UK
Event Horizon (with Michael Kamen)	Released: 25 August 1997; Labels: London; Format: CD, cassette, vinyl	83
Octane	Released: 20 October 2003; Labels: EMI; Format: CD, vinyl	–
Pusher	Released: 29 October 2012; Labels: Silva Screen; Format: CD	–
The Pentaverate (Original Soundtrack from the Netflix Series)	Released: 5 May 2022; Labels: Lakeshore; Format: Digital, vinyl	–

=== Live albums ===
Title	Album details	UK
Orbital: Live at Glastonbury 1994–2004	Released: 11 June 2007; Labels: ACP Recordings, ATO Records; Format: CD	101
Glastonbury 1994	Released: 25 September 2026; Labels: London Records; Format: LP, CD, digital	57

=== Compilation albums ===
Title	Album details	UK
Peel Session	Released: 7 March 1994; Labels: FFRR, Polydor K.K., Internal; Format: CD	32
Diversions	Released: 22 March 1994; Labels: Full Frequency/Ils; Format: CD, cassette	–
Work 1989–2002	Released: 3 June 2002; Labels: FFRR; Format: CD, vinyl	36
Halcyon	Released: 26 September 2005; Labels: WEA; Format: CD	–
Orbital 20	Released: 8 June 2009; Labels: Rhino; Format: CD	118
30 Something	Released: 29 July 2022; Label: Orbital; Format: 2×CD, 4×LP, digital	19
A Beginner's Guide	Released: 8 November 2024; Label: London; Format: CD, LP, digital	–

=== Mix albums ===
- The Bedroom Sessions (2002, Mixmag)
- Back to Mine: Orbital (2002, DMC)

== Singles and extended plays ==
Year	Title	Chart positions					Album
Year	Title	UK	UK Dance	IRL	US Bub.	US Club Play	Album
1989	"Chime"	17	–	–	–	23	Orbital (Green Album)
1990	"Omen"	46	–	–	–	–	—
1991	III EP (including "Satan" and "Belfast")	31	–	–	–	–	Orbital (Green Album)
1991	"Midnight / Choice"	–	–	–	–	–	Orbital (Green Album)
1992	Mutations EP	24	–	–	–	–	Orbital (Green Album)
1992	Radiccio EP (including "Halcyon")	37	–	–	–	33	Orbital (Brown Album)
1993	"Lush 3"	43	–	–	–	–	Orbital (Brown Album)
1994	"Are We Here?" (featuring Alison Goldfrapp)	33	16	–	–	38	Snivilisation
1995	"Belfast/Wasted" / "Innocent X" (split single with Therapy?)	53	–	–	–	–	Wasted – The Best of Volume (Part 1) (originally released on Volume 3 in 1992)
1995	Times Fly (EP)	–	–	–	–	–	—
1996	"The Box"	11	2	25	–	–	In Sides
1996	"Satan Live"	3	–	7	–	–	—
1997	"The Saint"	3	3	7	4	–	The Saint soundtrack and In Sides (reissue)
1999	"Style"	13	3	–	–	–	The Middle of Nowhere
1999	"Nothing Left"	32	5	–	–	–	The Middle of Nowhere
2000	"Beached" (Orbital and Angelo Badalamenti)	36	15	–	–	–	The Beach soundtrack
2001	"Funny Break (One Is Enough)"	21	3	–	–	–	The Altogether
2001	"Illuminate" (12" only)	–	–	–	–	–	The Altogether
2002	Rest/Play EP	33	3	–	–	–	Work
2003	"Initiation"	–	–	–	–	-	Octane soundtrack and Blue Album (Japanese releases only)
2004	"One Perfect Sunrise" (featuring Lisa Gerrard) / "You Lot"	29	2	–	–	–	Blue Album
2004	"Acid Pants" (featuring Sparks)	–	–	–	–	–	Blue Album
2010	"Don't Stop Me" / "The Gun Is Good"	–	37	–	–	–	—
2012	"New France" (featuring Zola Jesus)	–	–	–	–	–	Wonky
2012	"Wonky" (featuring Lady Leshurr)	–	–	–	–	–	Wonky
2012	"Where Is It Going?"	–	–	–	–	–	Wonky
2012	"Beelzedub"	–	–	–	–	–	Wonky
2013	"Christmas Chime"	–	36	–	–	–	—
2017	"Kinetic 2017"	–	–	–	–	–	Monsters Exist (HMV exclusive edition)
2017	"Copenhagen"	–	–	–	–	–	Monsters Exist (HMV exclusive edition)
2018	"Tiny Foldable Cities"	–	–	–	–	–	Monsters Exist
2018	"P.H.U.K."	–	–	–	–	–	Monsters Exist
2018	"The End Is Nigh"	–	–	–	–	–	Monsters Exist
2019	"Buried Deeper Within"	–	–	–	–	–	Monsters Exist
2022	"Dirty Rat" (featuring Sleaford Mods)	–	–	–	–	–	Optical Delusion
2022	"Ringa Ringa (The Old Pandemic Folk Song)" (featuring Mediæval Bæbes)	–	–	–	–	–	Optical Delusion
2023	"Are You Alive?" (featuring Penelope Isles)	–	–	–	–	–	Optical Delusion
2023	"The Crane" (featuring Dina Ipavic)	–	–	–	–	–	Optical Delusion
2025	"Deepest" (featuring Tilda Swinton)	–	–	–	–	–	Radiccio 2025
2025	"Re-lush" (featuring Confidence Man)	–	–	–	–	–	Orbital 2 (The Brown Album Expanded)

== Compilation appearances ==
Tracks not released on an Orbital release.

Title	Released on	Year
"Chime (The Helium Mix)"	FFRR presents Gold on Black	1990
"Son of Chime"	Live at The Brain	1990
"Chime (Friends of Matthew Remix)"	October 91: Two	1991
"Open Mind (Remix by Orbital)"	Funky Alternatives Six	1991
"Adnan"	War Child: The Help Album	1995
"Equinox"	3rd Side of the Record: Compilation One	1995
"The Tranquiliser Busy Tranquilising"	Foundations: Coming up from the Streets	1997
"The Girl with the Sun in Her Head"	Sally's Photographic Memory	1997
"Technologicque Park"	Music from and Inspired by the Motion Picture xXx (a New Breed of Special Agent)	2002
"The Box (Equilibrium Found Mix)"	The Fire This Time	2002
"Lush (Hervé's Tree and Leaf Remix)"	Hervé: Ghetto Bass 2	2010
"Halcyon Teen Spirit" (with Elle Fanning)	Teen Spirit (Original Motion Picture Soundtrack)	2019

== Featured songs ==
- Sonatine (1993) "Belfast"
- Shopping (1994) "Crash and Carry"
- Hackers (1995) Soundtrack Vol.1 • "Halcyon + On + On" (shortened version) (Used as the film's theme)
- Hackers (1995) Soundtrack Vol.2 • "Speed Freak [Moby Remix]"
- Mortal Kombat (1995) • "Halcyon + On + On"
- Johnny Mnemonic (1995) • "Sad But True"
- The Saint (1997) • "The Saint Theme"
- A Life Less Ordinary (1997) • "The Box" and "Dŵr Budr"
- Test Drive 4 (1997) • "Out There Somewhere? (Part 2)" (Background music for the main menu)
- Spawn (1997) • "Satan" (with Kirk Hammett)
- π (1998) • "P.E.T.R.O.L"
- Human Traffic (1999) • "Belfast" (Played when the ravers are driving back from the house party and the sun rises over Cardiff, viewed from above)
- The Beach (2000) • "Beached"
- Groove (2000) • "Halcyon + On + On"
- CKY2K (2001) • "Halcyon + On + On"
- FreQuency (2001) • "Funny Break (One Is Enough) (Weekend Ravers Mix)"
- 24 Hour Party People (2002) • "Satan" (Played when Shaun Ryder fires a gun and sells the mastertapes of the Happy Mondays album Yes Please! to Tony Wilson in Dry Bar Fac 201)
- XXX (2002) • "Technologicque Park" (original to this film) (Orbital appears in the film performing during the night club/rave sequences)
- ER (episode: "Insurrection") • "Frenetic"
- BBC 40th anniversary celebration of Doctor Who (2003) • Doctor?
- Keen Eddie • (original to this programme) (score for first episode) (2003)
- Haggard: The Movie (2003) • "Doctor?" (Played while Valo and Falcone tape fæces to Glauren's garage door)
- Mean Girls (2004) • "Halcyon + On + On" (not on soundtrack) (Played in the last scene of Mean Girls before closing credits)
- It's All Gone Pete Tong • "Frenetic (Short Mix)"
- Wipeout • "Kein Trink Wasser", "P.E.T.R.O.L"
- Forza Motorsport 2 • "Nothing Left"
- Long Way Round (2004 BBC series) • "One Perfect Sunrise"

== Remixes ==
Year	Original artist	Title
1990	Queen Latifah	"Come Into My House" (The Orbital Mix)
1990	The Shamen	"Hear Me O My People"
1992	Daydreemer	"Show Me"
1992	EMF	"It's You" (13 ½% Extra Mix)
1992	Global Method	"Good Life"
1992	Golden Girls	"Kinetic"
1992	Meat Beat Manifesto	"Edge of No Control" (Take Control - Orbital Reply)
1992	Yellow Magic Orchestra	"Behind the Mask"
1993	Drum Club	"Alchemy" (Phasers On Stun Mix)
1993	Meat Beat Manifesto	"Mindstream" (Mind The Bend The Mind)
1993	Back to the Planet	"Daydream"
1993	Soft Ballet	"Believe in a Blue World"
1993	Abfahrt	"Come Into My Life" (Hart Fab Mix)
1994	Confusion	"Joy"
1994	Pressure of Speech	"Aphelion"
1994	Pressure of Speech	"X-Beats" (The Orbital Mix)
1995	Madonna	"Bedtime Story"
1997	Pressure of Speech	"X-Beats"
2000	Kraftwerk	"Expo 2000"
2003	Karl Bartos	"I'm the Message"
2008	Alabama 3	"Ska'd For Life"
2019	Plaid	"Maru"
2019	Floex	"The Glasshouse with Butterfly"
2020	DMA's	"Life Is a Game of Changing"
2020	Joris Voorn	"Never"
2021	Sleaford Mods	"I Don't Rate You"
2022	Morcheeba	"Namaste"
2022	Fontaines D.C.	"In ár gCroíthe go deo"
2023	Octave One feat. Karina Mia	"Price We Pay"
2024	Energy 52	"Café Del Mar"
2025	Confidence Man	"Far Out"
2025	The Cure	"Endsong"
