= A Beginner's Guide =

A Beginner's Guide (Best Of)

Compilation album by Orbital
- Released: 8 November 2024
- Recorded: 1989–2024
- Genre: Electronica
- Length: 79:00
- Label: London
- Producer: Paul and Phil Hartnoll

Orbital chronology
Optical Delusion (2023)	A Beginner's Guide (Best Of) (2024)

A Beginner's Guide (Best Of) is a compilation album by electronic music duo Orbital released on 8 November 2024 through London Recordings. The release is Orbital's compilation.

== Track listing ==
A Beginner's Guide track listing
No.	Title	Original release	Length
1.	"Chime" (edit)	"Chime" single (1989)	3:13
2.	"Halcyon" (edit)	Radiccio EP (1992)	3:52
3.	"Belfast" (edit)	III EP (1990)	4:31
4.	"Satan (Spawn)" (featuring Kirk Hammett)	Spawn Soundtrack (1997)	3:44
5.	"The Box" (edit)	In Sides (1996)	4:13
6.	"Lush 3.1" (edit)	Orbital (The Brown Album) (1993)	5:54
7.	"Beached" (edit; featuring Angelo Badalamenti)	The Beach Soundtrack (2000)	3:37
8.	"Are We Here?" (edit)	Snivilisation (1994)	3:47
9.	"Are You Alive?" (edit; featuring Penelope Isles)	Optical Delusion (2023)	3:30
10.	"Style" (edit)	The Middle of Nowhere (1999)	4:07
11.	"Dirty Rat" (edit; featuring Sleaford Mods)	Optical Delusion (2023)	3:28
12.	"Funny Break (One Is Enough)" (single version)	The Altogether (2001)	3:56
13.	"Ringa Ringa The Old Pandemic Folk Song" (edit; featuring Mediæval Bæbes)	Optical Delusion (2023)	3:19
14.	"Remind"	Orbital (The Brown Album) (1993)	7:57
15.	"Illuminate" (featuring David Gray)	The Altogether (2001)	3:48
16.	"Doctor?"	The Altogether (2001)	5:30
17.	"The Girl with the Sun in Her Head"	In Sides (1996)	10:27
Total length:			79:00

== Charts ==
Chart performance for A Beginner's Guide
Chart (2024)	Peak position
Scottish Albums (OCC)	59
UK Album Downloads (OCC)	58
UK Dance Albums (OCC)	1
UK Independent Albums (OCC)	13
