= 30 Something (Orbital album) =

Greatest hits album by Orbital
- Released: 29 July 2022
- Recorded: 1989–2022
- Genre: Electronica
- Label: Orbital Recordings
- Producer: Paul and Phil Hartnoll

Orbital chronology
Monsters Exist (2018)	30 Something (2022)	Optical Delusion (2023)

Professional ratings
Aggregate scores
Source	Rating
Metacritic	75/100
Review scores
Source	Rating
AllMusic	3.5/5 stars
The Observer	3/5 stars
Pitchfork	7.2/10

30 Something is a compilation album by electronic music duo Orbital. It contains singles, album tracks and several new remixes. The release is Orbital's fourth hits collection.

It features re-recordings of some of the band's singles, as well as new remixes of the tracks by other artists, including Shanti Celeste, Dusky, Floex, David Holmes, Lone, Octave One, John Tejada, Joris Voorn, and Yotto.

== Background ==
Originally to be released in 2019, 30 Something was meant to also include rarities, as a part of the band's new deal with Because Music, which includes a new album in autumn 2022 (ultimately released in 2023 as Optical Delusion), and a series of reissues of Orbital's albums in 2023. The new versions of the tracks are based on how songs are played during contemporary concerts, compared to their original studio recordings.

== Track listing ==
CD 1
No.	Title	Original release	Length
1.	"Smiley"	Previously unreleased	7:09
2.	"Acid Horse"	Previously unreleased rework of an archival demo	5:31
3.	"Where Is It Going?" (featuring Stephen Hawking)	Previously unreleased mix of a track of the album Wonky (2012)	3:02
4.	"Impact" (30 Years Later and the Earth Is Still Burning Mix)	Orbital (The Brown Album) (1993)	11:52
5.	"Satan" (30 Something Years Later Mix)	III EP (1991)	7:16
6.	"Chime" (30 Something Years Later Mix)	Orbital (The Green Album) (1991)	5:44
7.	"Halcyon" (30 Something Years Later Mix)	Orbital (The Brown Album) (1993)	9:12
8.	"Belfast" (30 Something Years Later Mix)	III EP, 1991	9:39
9.	"The Box" (30 Something Years Later Mix)	In Sides (1996)	4:03
10.	"Are We Here?" (Dusky Remix)	Snivilisation (1994)	5:48
11.	"The Girl with the Sun in Her Head" (Floex Remix)	In Sides (1996)	4:46
12.	"Halcyon & On" (Logic 1000 Mix)	Orbital (The Brown Album) (1993)	4:52

CD 2
No.	Title	Length
1.	"Belfast" (ANNA Techno Remix)	7:27
2.	"Impact" (John Tejada Remix)	7:53
3.	"Chime" (Octave One Remix)	6:37
4.	"Halcyon & On" (Jon Hopkins Remix)	7:11
5.	"Are We Here?" (Shanti Celeste Remix)	5:36
6.	"Belfast" (Yotto Remix)	6:35
7.	"The Box" (Joris Voorn Remix)	6:44
8.	"The Girl with the Sun in Her Head" (Lone Remix)	8:12
9.	"Impact" (Rich NxT Remix (Edit))	5:09
10.	"Chime" (Eli Brown Remix)	5:33
11.	"Belfast" (David Holmes Remix)	12:02
12.	"Belfast" (ANNA Ambient Remix)	5:16

== Charts ==
Chart performance for 30 Something
Chart (2022)	Peak position
Belgian Albums (Ultratop Wallonia)	71
Scottish Albums (OCC)	7
UK Albums (OCC)	19
UK Dance Albums (OCC)	2
UK Independent Albums (OCC)	2
