= Orbital 20 =

Greatest hits album by Orbital
- Released: 8 June 2009
- Recorded: 1989–2004
- Genre: Electronica
- Label: Rhino Records (UK)
- Producer: Paul and Phil Hartnoll

Orbital chronology
Orbital: Live at Glastonbury 1994-2004 (2007)	Orbital 20 (2009)	Wonky (2012)

Professional ratings
Review scores
Source	Rating
PopMatters	3/10 stars
Rockfeedback	3/5 stars
State	3/5 stars

Orbital 20 (stylised as 2Orbital) is a compilation album by electronic music duo Orbital. It contains singles, album tracks and several new remixes. The release is Orbital's third hits collection; this one commemorating the 20th anniversary of the band's first release. The album is frequently titled as 2Orbital or 20rbital on sites such as Amazon. The song 'Choice' is incorrectly listed as 'Midnight' on Spotify.

== Track listing ==
CD 1
No.	Title	Originally from	Length
1.	"Chime" (Live Style Mix)	Chime single	4:19
2.	"Belfast"	III EP	8:09
3.	"Satan"	III EP	6:16
4.	"Halcyon" (Tom Middleton Re-Model)	New for this release	8:20
5.	"Lush 3"	Brown Album	10:22
6.	"Impact" (Live from Royal Albert Hall)	New for this release	12:39
7.	"Are We Here (Who Are They?)"	Are We Here? single	7:33
8.	"The Box" (Radio Edit)	The Box single	4:17
9.	"Nothing Left (Much Ado About Nothing Left)"	Nothing Left single	5:13
10.	"One Perfect Sunrise" (Radio Edit)	One Perfect Sunrise single	3:48

CD 2
No.	Title	Originally from	Length
1.	"Omen" (12" Mix)	Omen single	7:01
2.	"Choice"	Midnight / Choice single	5:34
3.	"The Naked and the Dead"	Radiccio EP	6:25
4.	"Sad But True"	Snivilisation	7:50
5.	"Style" (Single version)	Style single	4:07
6.	"Funny Break (One Is Enough)" (Single version)	Funny Break (One Is Enough) single	3:57
7.	"The Girl with the Sun in Her Head"	In Sides	10:29
8.	"Remind" (Live From New York)	New for this release	6:51
9.	"Lush" (Herve's 'Tree and Leaf' Remix)	New for this release	5:06
10.	"Impact (The Earth Is Burning)"	Brown Album	10:26
