= Peel Session (Orbital EP) =

Compilation album by Orbital
- Released: February 1994
- Recorded: September 1993
- Genre: Electronica
- Length: 29:51
- Label: FFRR
- Producer: Nick Gomm

Orbital chronology
Orbital 2 (1993)	Peel Session (1994)	Snivilisation (1994)

Peel Session is an EP by Orbital. It is the commercial release of a session first broadcast on the John Peel show on BBC Radio 1 on 10 September 1993.

== Session ==
The brothers went to the BBC's Maida Vale Studios to record for the Peel Sessions show. The session comprises four tracks, arranged in two medleys, described by Paul Hartnoll as "two, long jamming remixes off our programming". One of the medleys was done before lunch and one afterwards.

The first medley features new versions of tracks, Lush 3 and Walk About from the duo's previous album Orbital 2, also known as The Brown Album.

The second features a remake of "Semi Detached", the original version of which appeared on the various artists compilation Trance Europe Express, which segues into a new ambient music track, "Attached". The latter was itself remade for Orbital's next album, Snivilisation.

Samples of laughter heard in 'Lush 3 (Eurotunnel Disaster '94)' are taken from director Mike Leigh's 1991 film Life Is Sweet.

== Track listing ==
1. "Lush (Eurotunnel Disaster '94)"
2. "Walk About" (remake of "Walk Now")
3. "Semi Detached"
4. "Attached"
