= Omen (Orbital song) =

Single by Orbital
- Released: 10 September 1990
- Recorded: 1990
- Genre: Techno
- Length: 4:12; 6:59 (12")
- Label: FFRR
- Songwriter(s): P&P Hartnoll
- Producer(s): P&P Hartnoll

Orbital singles chronology
"Chime" (1990)	"Omen" (1990)	"III (Orbital EP)" (1992)

"Omen" is a song by Orbital, released as a single in the UK on 10 September 1990. It is the follow-up to their debut single "Chime".

Other tracks on the single are the Deeper remix "2 Deep" and "Open Mind". Early printings of the release had "Omen 7" mix" as track 2, mislabeled "2 Deep" on the tracklist. Later printings actually include "2 Deep".

== Remixes ==
The 12-inch remix release "Omen Remixes" had four remixes of the title song, with titles from the Tarot: "The Chariot", "The Tower", "Wheel of Fortune", and "The Fool" (mislabeled "The Fall)". These mixes where unavailable digitally until the single was remastered and re-released in 2024.

== Samples ==
"Omen" samples "Song to the Siren" by This Mortal Coil and "(How to Be A) Millionaire" by ABC.

== Artwork ==
The record sleeve was designed by the usual Orbital collaborator Gavin Fultano (Fultano 90) with photography by Sally Harding and computerised by Chris Smith. The sleeve features a clasping hand in what looks like a heat map.
