= Wonky (album) =

Studio album by Orbital
- Released: 2 April 2012
- Recorded: January–November 2011
- Genre: IDM; drum and bass; wonky
- Length: 50:34
- Label: ACP
- Producer: Orbital, Flood

Orbital chronology
Blue Album (2004)	Wonky (2012)	Monsters Exist (2018)

Paul Hartnoll chronology
The Ideal Condition (2007)	Wonky (2012)	8:58 (2015)

Singles from Wonky
- 1. "New France" Released: 27 February 2012; 2. "Wonky" Released: 21 April 2012; 3. "Where Is It Going?" Released: 27 August 2012; 4. "Beelzedub" Released: 7 December 2012

Wonky is the eighth studio album by Orbital, released on their own ACP label (via Warner Music Group/Alternative Distribution Alliance) in the UK on 2 April 2012, and exclusively through iTunes in the United States and Canada on 17 April 2012. The album is their first since the Blue Album in 2004 and the first since they reformed in 2008. It features vocals from Zola Jesus and Lady Leshurr.

Wonky debuted at number 22 on the UK Albums Chart, selling 8,001 copies in its first week. This was their highest position on the album chart since 2001.

== Recording ==
Following their reformation and successful comeback shows, Orbital decided that they needed to write new material to include in their live shows. The album was recorded mostly using vintage and analogue synthesizers, primarily the Macbeth M5, Moog Voyager, and Jomox SunSyn as well as a Roland 303, 808, 909, and SH-02, between January and November 2011 in Brighton where the Hartnoll brothers both lived. The recording of the album was documented with video diaries, where the brothers shared commentary and works and progress. The band plotted out the album's sound and structure very early on with a visual map drawn on old wallpaper, kept on their studio wall and annotated with sticky notes. Producer Flood was brought in to help with the mixing.

The vocal samples from "One Big Moment" were favorites collected over the course of their career. Paul started searching for a vocalist for "New France" later in the recording process, and while using Spotify discovered Zola Jesus, whom he "instantly fell in love with." Her vocals were recorded in London while on tour in Europe. "Wonky" began as an "off-the-map" instrumental demo recorded for their 2011 Glastonbury DJ set at the Arcadia stage, before the idea to feature a "Missy Elliot-type" rapper occurred. It was nicknamed "Cats" in the studio due to its unintentional cat-like sounds. The accompanying video for the single release featured numerous cats with CGI animated mouths 'meowing' to these sounds. "Distractions" was inspired by the dub sounds of Adrian Sherwood and samples the voice of folk singer Emily Portman. "Beelzedub" is a remix of their early 1990 song "Satan" which evolved from changes made to the track over years of live performances, and was originally not intended for the album until producer Flood "begged" the duo to include it. Similarly, "Stringy Acid" originated from an unfinished demo created in late 1989, which was re-discovered on an old cassette tape and re-worked for the album. Orbital described the title of "Where Is It Going?" as an optimistic question about the future of the band.

The album's title is, according to Paul Hartnoll, a reference to the fact that "we've never really fitted in".

== Promotion ==
The track "Never" was released as a free download from the official Orbital site in January 2012. An edited version of "New France" was released as the first single on 27 February 2012 as a single track download, with a remix EP released on 19 March 2012 featuring remixes from L-Vis 1990, Tom Middleton and The Hydraulic Dogs. The title track was released as the second single on 21 April 2012. "Where Is It Going?" was released as the third single on 27 August.

== Release ==
Wonky was released as a CD album, a double CD album, a vinyl LP and as a digital download. The double CD album includes a second disc featuring five tracks recorded live in Australia in 2010. The iTunes Deluxe version also features two music videos for "Never" and "Straight Sun".

== Reception ==
Professional ratings
Aggregate scores
Source	Rating
Metacritic	74/100
Review scores
Source	Rating
AllMusic	3.5/5 stars
DIY	4/5 stars
Drowned in Sound	8/10
The Independent	3/5 stars
Mixmag	3/5 stars
Mojo	4/5 stars
NME	8/10
Pitchfork	7.5/10
Q	4/5 stars
Spin	8/10

The album received generally favourable reviews. The aggregated score from 20 reviews on Metacritic gave it an average of 74/100.

Many critics felt that Wonky was Orbital's best album in some time. Drowned in Sound wrote "Well here's something I never thought I'd ever write again: the new Orbital album is great", and went on to say that Wonky was "the best record Orbital have made in the past 15 years and up there with their very best". Mojo said "the best Orbital album since 1994's Snivilisation? Certainly". Steve Price (writing on the Orbital website Loopz) reviewed the album on 4 February 2012 and said "...after many weeks of listening, I feel this is probably one of the best Orbital albums since In Sides". MusicOMH stated "as it turns out, this is not a duo in the last throes of their musical lives – rather it marks the beginning of a new and potentially very exciting chapter for the Hartnoll brothers".

The NME said "Wonky has reconnected them with the lush spirit of their first and second albums". AllMusic said "it feels a touch forced, but what remains clear is that the Hartnolls still have the ability to make magic more than 20 years after their debut". BBC Music said "nobody would expect an eighth album by a band 20-plus years into its career to sound this fantastic, but time away has obviously helped re-energise the brothers into crafting this triumphantly grand return". Pitchfork said "it's not perfect, but it is an unexpectedly great comeback album". Mary Chang of This Is Fake DIY suggested Wonky was "further proof that Orbital aren’t content to stand still and rest on the laurels that have made them ones to watch at festivals."

Martyn Cooling of Faux Magazine said "despite the terrible name and the altogether confusingly placeless lead single (of the same name), the album is a complex yet completely solid piece of work that will remind listeners of the early 1990s techno-film-score Orbital and their self titled first albums, rather than the latter day The Altogether & Blue Album era".

Tony Vilgotsky of Mir Fantastiki gave the album 9 points of 10, having said that this is a "bizarre and strange record from the electronic music's patriarchs, one of the most notable releases of the year".

== Track listing ==
Tracks 1, 2, 3, 5, 6 and 9 written by Paul Hartnoll. Track 7 written by Paul and Phil Hartnoll. Track 4 written by Paul Hartnoll and Nika Roza Danilova. Track 8 written by Paul Hartnoll, Phil Hartnoll and Melesha O'Garro

1. "One Big Moment" – 6:16
2. "Straight Sun" – 5:28
3. "Never" – 4:43
4. "New France" (featuring Zola Jesus) – 4:47
5. "Distractions" – 7:04
6. "Stringy Acid" – 5:19
7. "Beelzedub" – 4:54
8. "Wonky" (featuring Lady Leshurr) – 6:13
9. "Where Is It Going?" – 5:50
- Note: "Beelzedub" is a remix of their early '90s song "Satan".

=== Deluxe edition bonus disc ===
Tracks written by Paul and Phil Hartnoll except Belfast written by Paul Hartnoll, Phil Hartnoll and Hildegard.

1. "Lush" (Live in Australia) – 10:22
2. "Impact" (Live in Australia) – 19:17
3. "Satan" (Live in Australia) – 8:37
4. "Belfast" (Live in Australia) – 7:38
5. "Chime"/"Crime" (Live in Australia) – 13:02
- Note: Although uncredited on the track listing, "Impact" segues into the track "Remind".
- Vocal samples for this version of "Satan" are from the 1968 film The Devil Rides Out

== Charts ==
Chart performance for Wonky
Chart (2012)	Peak position
Australian Albums (ARIA)	186
Belgian Albums (Ultratop Flanders)	44
Scottish Albums (OCC)	24
UK Albums (OCC)	22
UK Dance Albums (OCC)	3
