= Times Fly (EP) =

EP by Orbital
- Released: 21 August 1995
- Genre: Electronic
- Label: Internal
- Producer: Orbital

Orbital EP chronology
Radiccio EP (1991)	Times Fly (1995)	Rest/Play EP (2002)

Times Fly is an EP by the British techno producers Orbital. It was released through FFRR Records, on their Internal label, on 21 August 1995.

The EP features four tracks and the 12" version covers two pieces of vinyl with a track over each side. There are two versions of the title track, "Times Fly (Slow)", a downtempo track, and "Times Fly (Fast)", with a more drum and bass feel. The EP also includes "Sad But New", an alternate version of "Sad But True" from the Snivilisation album, featuring vocals by Alison Goldfrapp. "Sad But New" samples then-current Prime Minister John Major discussing New Age travellers. In its original broadcast on BBC Radio 1 via ISDN, "Sad But True" featured extensive samples from John Major edited together into a protest message.

An even faster version of "Times Fly" called "Equinox" was published on the 1995 compilation 3rd Side of the Record: Compilation One. A version of "The Tranquilizer" called "The Tranquiliser Busy Tranquilising" was later published on the 1997 compilation Foundations: Coming up from the Streets.

== Track listing ==
- A. "Times Fly (Slow)" (7:58)
- B. "Sad But New" (7:29)
- C. "Times Fly (Fast)" (7:53)
- D. "The Tranquilizer" (6:27)

== Artwork ==
The sleeve was designed by Grant Fulton (Fultano Absenti 95) and Pete Mauder (Mauder) with photography by John Ross. The design features cog wheels.
