= Halcyon (Best Of) =

Halcyon (Best of)

Greatest hits album by Orbital
- Released: September 27, 2005
- Genre: Electronica
- Label: Warner Music
- Producer: Orbital

Orbital chronology
Blue Album (2004)	'''Halcyon (Best of)''' (2005)	Orbital: Live at Glastonbury 1994-2004 (2007)

Halcyon (Best of) is a compilation album by the British electronica duo Orbital featuring a selection of singles from their career together, it was released in 2005.

== The album ==
Though the group's "official" greatest hits album Work 1989-2002 had been released three years earlier, in 2005 the band's parent label Warner decided to release a Platinum series of "Best of" albums. Some Warner artist albums were dropped to permanent low prices but most had an album specifically created for this series. The album was specifically created for and released in the North American market; Orbital's official website Loopz even goes so far as to dub the album "USA Best of".

Some retailers also list the album as Halcyon: The Platinum Collection.

== Track listing ==
1. The Moebius – 7:04
2. Chime – 3:14
3. Belfast – 8:08
4. Halcyon – 3:54
5. Nothing Left – 3:43
6. Frenetic – 4:07
7. Fahrenheit 303 – 8:27
8. The Box, Pt. 2 – 6:00
9. Philosophy by Numbers – 6:41
10. Oi – 5:06
11. Doctor? – 5:32
