= Psychick Warriors ov Gaia =

Dutch music record producers

Psychick Warriors ov Gaia was a group of Dutch techno music record producers from the town of Tilburg, also known as PWOG, Thee Disciples ov Gaia and Sluagh Ghairm. Two of the members were affiliated with Thee Temple ov Psychick Youth. The group has included Bobby Reiner, Boris Hiesserer, Joris Hilckmann, Reinier Brekelmans, Reinoud van den Broek, Robbert Heynen and Tim Freeman. Heynen started eXquisite CORpsE, a musical side project which had several releases, which he left the group in 1992 to concentrate solely on. The liner notes to In Absence (a 2016 live set) presents it as the group's final show. After the performance Robbert Heijnen, Reinier Brekelmans and Tim Freeman founded the band Sumus.

== Discography ==
=== Albums ===
- Psychick Warriors ov Gaia (1989, Katharos Foundation) (40 minutes tape)
- Ov Biospheres and Sacred Grooves: a Document ov New Edge Folk Classics (1992, KK Records)
- Record of Breaks (1995, KK Records)
- In Absence (2017, Sumus) (One hour live set)

=== Compilations ===
- History of Psychick Phenomenon (1996, Never Records / KK Records)
- The Key (2002, Terminal Antwerp)

=== Singles and EPs ===
- "Exit 23: Ritual Dance Music" (Single, 1990, KK Records / Cargo Records)
- "Maenad" (Single, 1991, KK Records / Cargo Records)
- "Obsidian (Organically Decomposed)" (Single, 1992, KK Records / Restless Records)
- "Exit 23: The Drum Club Remixes" (Single, 1993, KK Records)
- "Psychick Rhythms Vol. 1" (EP, 1993, KK Records / Restless Records)
- "Out Now!" (Single, 1994, KK Records / Restless Records) – No. 19 on CMJ RPM Charts
- "Peel Session" (EP, 1994, KK Records / Restless Records)
- "Kraak" (Single, 1995, KK Records)
- "Psychick Age EP" (EP, 1996, Never Records)
- "Rejammed: Kraak Remixes" (EP, 1996, KK Records)
- "Kind of Prayer" (Single, 2002, Terminal Antwerp)
- "Maenad/Exit 23" (12" EP, 2002, Terminal Antwerp)

=== Remix work ===
- Orbital – Lush 3-4 (Warrior Drift)
- The Golden Palominos – Prison of the Rhythm (Dizzy Drift mix)
- Mark Broom – Funked Up (PWoG remix)

=== Remixes by other artists ===
In 1993, Drum Club remixed Exit 23 three times. The third one first appears on the Ov Biospheres and Sacred Grooves 1993 edition (released by Restless Records) and all of them were released on the single "Exit 23 (The Drum Club Remixes)". The group had their track "Kraak" remixed by Plastikman, Coil and Mark Broom on "PWOG Rejammed: Kraak Remixes". In 2002, Terminal Antwerp released new remixes by Alter Ego, Michael Mayer and The Golden Palominos.
