= Work 1989–2002 =

Work 1989-2002

Compilation album by Orbital
- Released: 3 June 2002
- Genre: Electronica, acid house, breakbeat
- Length: 1:09:45
- Label: FFRR
- Producer: Orbital

Orbital chronology
The Altogether (2001)	'''Work 1989-2002''' (2002)	Octane (OST) (2003)

Professional ratings
Review scores
Source	Rating
AllMusic	4/5 stars
NME	3.5/5 stars
Rolling Stone	4/5 stars

Work 1989–2002 is a compilation album by the British electronica duo Orbital, released in 2002. It features a selection of singles and rare tracks from their career. Work was Orbital's final album for FFRR.

== The album ==
"Chime", "Choice", "Satan" and "Belfast" were previously released (in different forms) on the US version of Orbital (1991). The version of "Satan" was released on the Spawn soundtrack. "Lush", "Impact" and "Halcyon" appeared on the Brown Album. "Are We Here?" appeared on Snivilisation. "The Box" was a single for the In Sides album. "Nothing Left" and "Style" are from the album The Middle of Nowhere. "Funny Break" and "Illuminate" are from The Altogether.

== Track listing ==
No.	Title	Length
1.	"Chime" (7" single version, 1990)	3:13
2.	"Choice" (Original version, 1991 Crucifix Vocal U.S. Hardcore Punk)	5:32
3.	"Illuminate" (Short version featuring David Gray, previously unreleased)	3:47
4.	"Satan Spawn" (Re-recorded for the movie Spawn with Metallica's Kirk Hammett, 1997)	3:44
5.	"Nothing Left" (Short version, 1999)	3:42
6.	"Halcyon" (7" version, 1993)	3:51
7.	"Impact (The Earth Is Burning)" (USA version, 1993)	11:20
8.	"Are We Here?" (Industry Standard? version)	3:47
9.	"Style" (Single version, 1999)	4:05
10.	"The Box" (Single version, 1996)	4:13
11.	"Frenetic" (Previously unreleased)	4:06
12.	"Lush 3-1" (Original version, 1993)	5:54
13.	"Funny Break (One Is Enough)" (Single version, 2001)	3:56
14.	"Belfast" (Original version, 1991)	8:09

Japanese release bonus track
No.	Title	Length
15.	"Chime" (Live Style Radio Mix)	6:28
