= Midnight / Choice =

Single by Orbital
- Released: 26 August 1991
- Recorded: 1990
- Label: FFRR
- Songwriter: P&P Hartnoll
- Producers: P&P Hartnoll

Orbital singles chronology
| "III EP" (1991) | "Midnight / Choice" (1991) | "Halcyon" (1992) |

"Midnight" / "Choice" is a double A side single released by Orbital. This single was released in the UK in August 1991. "Choice" samples, and takes its name from, the track "Annihilation" by the hardcore punk band Crucifix.

"Midnight" appears on both the UK and US versions of The Green Album, though in different forms: The US edition features an edited version of the track, while the UK edition contains a live version with a significantly different arrangement. "Choice" also appears on the US version of the album.

The 1991 printing of the CD single feature "Midnight (Sasha Remix)" as track 1, labeled simply as "Midnight". A 1995 printing replace this with the original version of "Midnight". The CD single also included a third track, "Analogue Test 90".

== Remixes ==
As with all of Orbital's first four singles, there was a remix vinyl single of Midnight/Choice, published a week later. Track 1 was the Sasha remix of "Midnight" that had appeared in place of the non-remix version of Midnight on the CD single. There was also a remix of Choice by British band Eye and I.

== Record cover design ==
The record sleeve was designed by the usual Orbital collaborator Gavin Fultano (Fultano 90). The cover features a label diagram of a dissected eye.

== Track listings ==
- 12" vinyl / cassette single

A "Midnight"
AA "Choice"

- 12" remix single

A "Midnight (Sasha Remix)"
AA "Choice (Eye and I Remix)"

- CD single
1. "Midnight"
2. "Choice"
3. "Analogue Test Feb 90"

Note: Track 1 is "Midnight (Sasha Remix)" on the 1991 printing, although labeled just "Midnight".

- 7" single (promo only)

A "Midnight (Radio Edit)" (3:20)
AA "Choice (Radio Edit)" (3:24)

== 2024 remaster ==
All versions and remixes were remastered and re-released in 2024.

== Charts ==
| Chart (1991) | Peak position |
|---|---|
| UK Dance (Music Week) | 41 |
