= Monsters Exist =

Studio album by Orbital
- Released: 14 September 2018
- Length: 50:06
- Label: ACP
- Producer: Orbital

Orbital chronology
Wonky (2012)	Monsters Exist (2018)	30 Something (2022)

Singles from Monsters Exist
- 1. "Tiny Foldable Cities" Released: 11 May 2018; 2. "P.H.U.K." Released: 28 June 2018; 3. "The End Is Nigh" Released: 29 August 2018

Monsters Exist is the ninth studio album by Orbital, released on 14 September 2018 through their own ACP label. It is their first studio album in six years (their last studio album Wonky was released in 2012) and the first since they reformed for the second time in 2017. The title is shown in the earlier video for "The Box" in 1996 when Tilda Swinton glances at an array of TV screens.

== Critical reception ==
Professional ratings
Aggregate scores
Source	Rating
Metacritic	67/100
Review scores
Source	Rating
AllMusic	3.5/5 stars
The Arts Desk	4/5 stars
Drowned in Sound	8/10
Exclaim!	6/10
Pitchfork	6.0/10
PopMatters	8/10
Q	3/5 stars
Release Magazine	10/10
Slant Magazine	3/5 stars
Uncut	4/5 stars

The album received generally positive reception, with a score of 67 out of 100 based on nine reviews on Metacritic.

== Track listing ==
No.	Title	Length
1.	"Monsters Exist"	5:52
2.	"Hoo Hoo Ha Ha"	4:04
3.	"The Raid"	5:00
4.	"P.H.U.K."	7:25
5.	"Tiny Foldable Cities"	5:45
6.	"Buried Deep Within"	4:27
7.	"Vision OnE"	5:44
8.	"The End Is Nigh"	4:36
9.	"There Will Come a Time" (featuring Professor Brian Cox)	7:13
Total length:		50:06

Deluxe edition
No.	Title	Length
10.	"Kaiju"	5:25
11.	"A Long Way from Home"	1:30
12.	"Analogue Test Oct 16"	3:06
13.	"Fun with the System"	4:15
14.	"Dressing Up in Other People's Clothes"	4:37
15.	"To Dream Again"	4:38
16.	"There Will Come a Time" (Instrumental)	7:13
17.	"Tiny Foldable Cities" (Kareful Remix)	3:36
Total length:		34:20

HMV exclusive (UK) / Indie record store exclusive (US)
No.	Title	Length
18.	"Kinetic 2017"	6:12
19.	"Copenhagen"	5:26
20.	"To Dream Again" (Reocurring Mix)	4:02
21.	"Where Is It Going?" (Live Style Mix)	7:56
Total length:		23:36

== Charts ==
Chart performance for Monsters Exist
Chart (2018)	Peak position
Belgian Albums (Ultratop Flanders)	143
Belgian Albums (Ultratop Wallonia)	110
Irish Albums (IRMA)	43
Scottish Albums (OCC)	11
UK Albums (OCC)	12
US Heatseekers Albums (Billboard)	9
US Top Dance/Electronic Albums (Billboard)	24
