= Halcyon (Orbital song) =

- Radiccio EP cover

Single by Orbital

from the album Orbital (Brown album)
- Released: 1992 (original); 1993 ("+ On + On")
- Recorded: 1992
- Genre: Ambient house, acid house, ambient techno
- Length: 11:05 (original version); 3:51 (edit); 9:27 ("+ On + On" version)
- Label: FFRR
- Songwriters: Edward Barton; Phil and Paul Hartnoll
- Producer: Orbital

Orbital singles chronology
"Midnight / Choice" (1991)	"Halcyon" (1992)	"Lush 3" (1993)

Orbital EP chronology
Mutations EP (1992)	Radiccio EP (1992)	Times Fly (1996)

"Halcyon" is a song written and performed by English electronic music duo Orbital, dedicated to Phil and Paul Hartnoll's mother, who was addicted to the tranquilliser Halcion (Triazolam) for many years. It was released as Radiccio EP in the UK and Japan, and as Halcyon EP in the US.

== History ==
The song features two samples from earlier international hit singles. The first sample is a backmasked vocal sample by Kirsty Hawkshaw from "It's a Fine Day" by Opus III (1992). Ed Barton, the composer of "It's a Fine Day", receives a co-writing credit for the track. The second is a vocal harmonies sample in the song "Leave It" from the 1983 album 90125 by the progressive rock band Yes. There is no co-writing credit for the Yes sample. The beats were produced by a Roland TR-909 drum machine.

This original form of Halcyon is relatively uncommon; it first appeared on the Radiccio EP, and was only in the U.S. released as a single under its own name. It did not appear on a full-length album until the compilation Work 1989-2002, and then only in its shorter "single edit".

Orbital's second eponymous album includes the track "Halcyon + on + on", a slightly more upbeat and melodic remix of the original song. In contrast to the original, the remix is far more widely known, and has been featured on several movie soundtracks (most notably Mortal Kombat (1995), Hackers, CKY2K and Mean Girls). The title of the remix is inspired by a contemporary advertising slogan used by the Ariston washing machine company ("Ariston + on + on"). "Halcyon + on + on" is somewhat shorter than the original, at 9 minutes and 27 seconds long.

The 2018 film Teen Spirit and its soundtrack album feature an edited version of "Halcyon", retitled "Halcyon Teen Spirit", with added vocal samples by Elle Fanning.

== Halcyon samples ==
"Halcyon" is one of the mainstays of Orbital's live performances, in which it is frequently remixed with clips from Belinda Carlisle's "Heaven Is a Place on Earth" and Bon Jovi's "You Give Love a Bad Name". A 1999 performance containing these samples appears on the album Orbital: Live at Glastonbury 1994–2004. On occasion (notably the group's 2004 "last ever" performance broadcast on BBC Radio 1) it has also incorporated the chorus of "I Believe in a Thing Called Love" by The Darkness.

In June 2009, Orbital released a two CD greatest hits compilation Orbital 20, which included a number of new remixes, including a "remodel" of "Halcyon" by Tom Middleton.

== Music video ==
The song's video featured Opus III singer Kirsty Hawkshaw playing a typical mother who was 'under the influence', likely on Halcion, (which was shot in the Hartnolls' home), who begins her chores by washing dishes.

As she starts doing the task, it becomes evident that she starts to lose focus and start seeing things. Like pictures of the same person on a plate (when removed by plate the picture starts to get smaller), notices her two sons in unusual places (one dancing on a table; the other inside the cabinet below the sink, then in the sink), throwing items from her purse into the water and also washes them (including Barbara Cartland's novel "Shotgun Wedding"). She discovers a bald person who looks like her and tries to push them back into the sink and as she drains the water she also fights with it by using a bouquet of roses.

She then starts dancing in an erratic behaviour before she calms down, and when she turns around she sees herself coming into the kitchen. The video ends with a definition for Halcyon and Halcyon Days on the screen.

== Track listing ==
=== 1992, Radiccio (UK release) ===
12", Radiccio 1

1. Halcyon (11:07)
2. The Naked And The Dub (11:51)

CD, Radiccio

1. Halcyon (11:07)
2. The Naked And The Dead (6:23)
3. Sunday (7:14)

CD, Radiccio 2

1. Halcyon Edit (3:57)
2. Halcyon (11:07)
3. Deeper (6:58)

=== 1992, Halcyon (US release) ===
12", Halcyon

1. Halcyon (11:05)
2. The Naked And The Dub (11:51)

CD, Halcyon

1. Halcyon (11:07)
2. The Naked And The Dead (6:23)
3. The Naked And The Dub (11:51)
4. Sunday (7:10)
5. Chime (Radio Edit) (3:15)

=== 1993, Radiccio (Japan release) ===
CD, Radiccio

1. Halcyon Edit (3:52)
2. Halcyon (11:09)
3. Deeper (6:59)
4. The Naked And The Dead (6:25)
5. Sunday (7:13)
6. The Naked And The Dub (11:53)

Some versions of this CD repeat "The Naked And The Dead" instead of "The Naked And The Dub".

== Charts ==
Year (1992)	Peak position
UK Singles (Official Charts)	37
UK Dance (Music Week)	3
UK Club Chart (Music Week)	48
