= Drum Club =

Drum Club was a British 1990s electronic music duo, of former promoters and DJs Charlie Hall and Lol Hammond. They released several albums and singles on record labels such as Big Life and Butterfly Records. Their 1993 single "Sound System" reached No. 63 on the UK Singles Chart. They have remixed artists such as Psychick Warriors Ov Gaia, Chapterhouse, Killing Joke, Transglobal Underground and Invaders Of The Heart, and have been remixed by artists including Hardkiss, Underworld, Youth and Orbital.

== Selected discography ==
=== Albums ===
- 1993: Everything is Now (Butterfly/Big Life)
- 1994: Drums Are Dangerous (Butterfly, Instinct Records)
- 1995: Live in Iceland (Sabrettes, Instinct Records)

=== Singles ===
- 1992: "U Make Me Feel So Good" (Guerilla Records)
- 1993: "Alchemy" (Guerilla Records)
- 1993: "Sound System" (Butterfly Records)
- 1994: "Drums Are Dangerous"' (Butterfly Records)
- 1997: "You Make Me Feel So Good" (Jackpot)

Remixes

- 1994: Psychic TV - "Tribal"
