= Where Is It Going? =

Single by Orbital

from the album Wonky
- Released: 27 August 2012
- Recorded: 2011
- Genre: Electronica, electro house, big beat
- Length: 5:50; 3:51 (radio edit)
- Label: ACP
- Songwriter: Paul Hartnoll
- Producer: P&P Hartnoll

Orbital singles chronology
"Wonky" (2012)	"Where Is It Going?" (2012)

"Where Is It Going?" is a 2012 single by Orbital, taken from their album Wonky. The track was released as a three track download only single on 28 August 2012. A medley of "Where Is It Going?" and Ian Dury's "Spasticus Autisticus" was performed at the 2012 Summer Paralympics opening ceremony. Orbital performed with the Graeae Theatre Company with John Kelly reprising the Ian Dury performance. The version in the ceremony featured a sample of Professor Stephen Hawking's voice saying "transform our perceptions". Hawking joined the band on stage during the performance and wore their trademark torch glasses.

== Track listing ==
1. "Where Is It Going?" (Radio Edit) – 3:51
2. "Where Is It Going?" (Live Style Mix) – 8:30
3. "Where Is It Going?" (Steve Mac & Phil Hartnoll Dub Mix) –8:19
