= Joris Voorn =

- Also known as: Dark Science, Third Nation
- Born: 25 February 1977 (age 49); Tilburg, North Brabant, Netherlands
- Genres: House, techno, tech house, trance
- Occupations: Record producer, DJ
- Years active: 1997–present
- Labels: Sony, Spectrum, Green
- Website: jorisvoorn.com

Joris Voorn (Dutch pronunciation: [ˈjoːrɪs ˈfoːr(ə)n]; (Note: In isolation, Voorn is pronounced [ˈvoːr(ə)n].) born 25 February 1977) is a Dutch DJ and record producer who lives in Amsterdam. Voorn is the co-owner of the Amsterdam-based labels Rejected (with Edwin Oosterwal) and Green.

== Biography ==
A DJ competition in Enschede started Voorn's music career. In 2002, he released an EP, "Muted Trax". This release, as well as support from Carl Craig, Derrick May and Laurent Garnier made him decide to focus on his DJing career. In 2003, his "Lost Memories" EP became another underground hit. In the same year, Voorn was crowned Talent of the Year at the Dutch DJ Awards.

In 2005, he founded the ‘Green’ which is one of the two labels which he runs with long-time collaborator Edwin Oosterwal.

In 2009, he released the "Balance014" compilation, which mixed 100 songs into a double CD, morphing them into a collective mix.

Voorn also released the "Dusty House Room" EPs and reached 10th place in the Resident Advisor's DJ top 100.

In 2014, he released his third studio album "Nobody Knows," which features collaborations with Matthew Dear, Kid A and his father. The album is not all electronic and features live instruments such as guitar and bass. In 2019, he released his fourth studio album Four.

In April 2020, Orbital, an EDM artist Voorn grew up listening to, released a rework of Voorn's "Never."

In October 2020, Global Underground released GU43 featuring Joris Voorn. The record features some of his own tracks and has been described as melodic tech-house.

In 2020, Tomorrowland (EDM Festival) announced they will be streaming 2020-21 New Year's Eve celebrations online and one of the featured DJs would be Voorn.

== Discography ==
=== Singles ===
Muted Trax Pt 1, Pt 2 & Pt 3 (Keynote, 2002, 2003, 2004)
The Way Things Appear (Wolfskuil Records, 2003)
Lost Memories Pt 1 & Pt 2 (SINO, 2003, 2004)
Line 3 / 4 ( Line, 2003)
The First Sound (Sound Architecture, 2004)
A Dedicated Mind (Green, 2005)
Chemistry Of Attraction (Wolfskuil Records, 2005)
Club Wire (Green, 2005)
Coming From The Shower After A Late Night With A Failed Date (Green, 2006)
(Joris Voorn & Edwin Oosterwal) SL3 (Rejected, 2007)
When It Was Day We Made It Night (Green, 2007)
Let's Go Juno (Rejected, 2007)
Re: From A Deep Place (Green, 2008)
Fwd: From A Deep Place (Green, 2008)
Dusty House Room 1 (Rejected, 2009)
Dusty House Room 2 (Rejected, 2009)
The Secret (Cocoon Recordings, 2010)
UnTITLED Dub Vol. 1 (Rejected, 2011)
Together / The Tid (Rejected, 2011)
Incident (Miyagi)
Together Feat Nic Fanciulli (Rejected, 2011)
(Joris Voorn vs Moby) After the After (Rejection, 2011)
Dusty House | Room 6 (Rejected, 2012)
Ringo (Green, 2013)
(Joris Voorn vs Jordan Van Pol) Sonic Highway (Rejected, 2015)
This Story Until Now (EP) (Green, 2016)
The Great Esquape (EP) (Green, 2016)
Iran The Zoo (EP) (Green, 2017)

=== Albums ===
Future History (SINO, 2004)
From A Deep Place (Green, 2007)
Nobody Knows (Green, 2014)
Four (Spectrum, 2019)
Serotonin (Spectrum, 2025)

=== Mix compilations ===
Fuse Presents Joris Voorn (Music Man Records / Minimaxima, 2005)
Balance 014 (EQ Recordings, 2009)
The Sound Of Sundays At Space Ibiza (Mixmag, 2010)
Cocoon Heroes (Mixed By Joris Voorn And Cassy) (Cocoon, 2012):
Fabric 83 (2015)
Global Underground 043: Rotterdam (2020)

== DJ Magazine Top 100 DJs ==
Year	Position	Notes	Ref.
2007	248	Out	
Hiatus
2009	133	Out	
2010	88	New Entry (Up 45)	
Hiatus
2012	148	Out	
