= Octane (film) =

- Theatrical release poster
- Directed by: Marcus Adams
- Written by: Stephen Volk
- Produced by: Alistair MacLean-Clark; Basil Stephens
- Starring: Madeleine Stowe; Norman Reedus; Bijou Phillips; Mischa Barton; Jonathan Rhys Meyers
- Cinematography: Robin Vidgeon
- Edited by: Trevor Waite
- Music by: Orbital; Simon Boswell
- Production company: Random Harvest
- Distributed by: Four Horseman Films
- Release dates: 25 June 2003 (CineVegas); 14 November 2003 (United Kingdom)
- Running time: 91 minutes
- Countries: United Kingdom; Luxembourg
- Language: English
- Budget: $10.5 million–$11.5 million

Octane (released as Pulse in the United States) is a 2003 psychological horror film directed by Marcus Adams, written by Stephen Volk, and starring Madeleine Stowe, Mischa Barton, and Norman Reedus. The film follows a divorced mother and her teenage daughter on a late-night road trip, and the mother's battle to find her daughter after she gets caught up with a cult of young bloodletting criminals at a truck stop.

Shot in Luxembourg, the film features a soundtrack by dance duo Orbital. It was released in the United Kingdom on 14 November 2003, having previously screened at the CineVegas Film Festival in the United States. Upon its release, the film was noted by some critics (such as Variety) for blending elements of American road films with surrealist horror.

== Plot ==
A man and woman posing as paramedics assist a man in an overturned car on a freeway. As an ambulance approaches, the woman panics, taping the man's mouth shut and pulling him from the car before speeding away. Meanwhile, single mother Senga Wilson and her 15-year-old daughter Natasha 'Nat' are on a six-hour overnight drive home, following a visit to Marek, Nat's father, for her birthday. En route, they pass by the crash, and Senga notices a strange man and woman photographing the scene; as Senga watches them, the man turns his camera and photographs her.

Unnerved and exhausted, Senga nearly falls asleep while driving, and decides to stop at a 24-hour truck stop diner. Outside, Nat meets a young female backpacker and offers her a ride. Senga is visibly disturbed by the backpacker and the strange ambient CD she plays in the car. They drop her at a picnic area and when they return seconds later to return the CD she left behind, she seems to have disappeared. Shortly after, Nat convinces her mother to return to the diner, so that she can get her birthday present from her father. Already stressed from the long drive, Senga is furious when she discovers that Marek has bought Nat tickets to a concert that she has refused to allow her to attend. After a heated argument, Nat gets into an RV with the backpacker and a strange couple.

Senga solicits the assistance of a police officer, but when she seems unhelpful, goes after the RV herself, tailing the officer who had just left the diner. The police officer meets up with the inhabitants of the RV. Senga breaks into their RV and discovers a number of strange things, including thermoses full of blood and videos of young girls talking about their past lives. She escapes the RV before anyone returns, but once back on the road, The Backpacker reveals herself to be hiding in the backseat. She strangles Senga, causing her to crash.

In the back of an oil tanker, Nat parties with the Backpacker and a young man, who tell her about their group and their enigmatic leader. Senga is woken by the recovery man, a disturbed drifter who cruises highways in his tow truck, who insists that Senga come with him. In his car, she finds a picture of a girl she saw in a video in the RV. The recovery man informs Senga that the girl is Christine, his dead sister. Senga is taken to a police station, where she reports Nat's disappearance. The police are less than helpful, and, in frustration, she asks them to call Marek. The man who answers Marek's phone tells the police that Senga is on medication, and that Nat has been with him all weekend.

Back at the truck stop, Senga sees the man and woman she had seen earlier photographing the car accident. As her paranoia mounts, she suspects them to be involved with Nat's disappearance, and attacks the woman, resulting in her being kicked out of the diner. While hiding in a hallway, she encounters the woman with two male cult members, and flees outside. As they leave the truck stop, the recovery man follows them in his truck; Senga follows behind, ending up at an abandoned research facility.

While Nat meets the Father, the recovery man detonates a bomb, killing several of the cult members. Before the Father can initiate Nat, Senga attacks him. Mother and daughter flee in different directions, with Senga being pursued by the backpacker and Nat being placated by the Father, who uses a loudspeaker to talk to her. During the fight, the Father reveals that Senga wanted to have an abortion when she discovered she was pregnant with Nat. The shock of this revelation leaves Senga in a near catatonic state.

The recovery man pulls her out of her stupor by showing her Marek's body. Senga uses this information to try to demonstrate to Nat how evil her new friends are. While mother and daughter try to escape, the recovery man and the Father wrestle; when the Father bites the recovery man's tongue and spits it out, Senga detonates his last bomb, killing them both. Senga and Nat leave, continuing their drive home in daylight. When they stop at a gas station, they return to their car to find a razor blade — the Father's calling card — attached to the rear view mirror.

== Cast ==
- Madeleine Stowe as Senga Wilson
- Mischa Barton as Natasha 'Nat' Wilson, Senga's teenage daughter
- Samuel Fröler as Marek Wilson, Senga's ex-husband and Nat's father
- Jonathan Rhys Meyers as The Father, the cult's leader
- Bijou Phillips as the Backpacker
- Leo Gregory as Joyrider
- Gary Parker and Amber Batty as the vacationing couple
- Jenny Jules as highway patrol sergeant
- Patrick O'Kane as the trucker
- Stephen Lord as Carjacker
- Sarah Drews as Christine
- Norman Reedus as the Recovery man, Christine's brother
- Martin McDougall as Motivational Speaker
- Shauna Shim as Paramedic
- David Menkin as Paramedic
- Nigel Whitmey as Detective Ned Stephens
- Dean Gregory as a Christian missionary
- Monika Hudgins as Southern woman
- Cesar Bayona Pinto as Latino busboy
- Véronique Koch and Ase Dunbar as Cashiers
- Nicolette Christie and Emma Drews as the teenage girl
- Tom Hunsiger as Crime Scene Investigator
- Sam Douglas as Crash site detective
- Rachel Pollack as Metro girl

== Themes ==
Writer John Kenneth Muir observes themes of substance abuse and addiction in the film. In particular, Muir cites Senga's reliance on prescription drugs paralleled with the cultists' indulgence in human vampirism: "Senga keeps ending up back at the same rest stop, and keeps seeing the same road travelers, again and again. The scene in which she goes to the police is... suggestive of an altered reality. This is either because Senga has 'been on medication since the divorce' from her husband, or because she and her daughter have slipped into the weird, twilight world of vampires."

Another prominent theme noted by Muir is that of family connections and motherhood; he writes that, "It is learned, at one point, for example that Senga wanted an abortion before Nat was born, and this information, too, is to make her seem like a hypocrite... Perhaps the message is that family is inherently imperfect and flawed, but a biological connection is still superior to a vampiric one, one based on blood lust, thievery, and unholy desires."

== Production ==
=== Development ===
Director Marcus Adams recalled producers Alistair MacLean-Clark and Basil Stephens approaching him to direct the film in 2001, which at that time was "essentially a vampire movie," which had been in development for around five years. Adams spent one year rewriting elements of the script with screenwriter Stephen Volk; this included altering the ending as well as subduing the overt vampire plot of the film, resulting in what Adams envisioned as "faint" vampire film, where vampires functioned more as a metaphor than as literal beings.

=== Casting ===
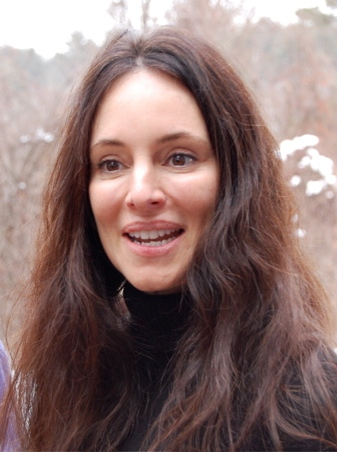
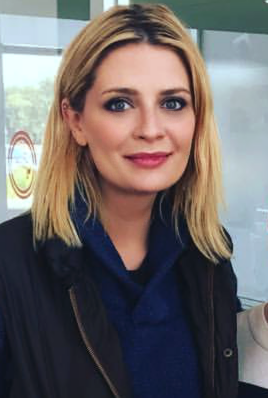
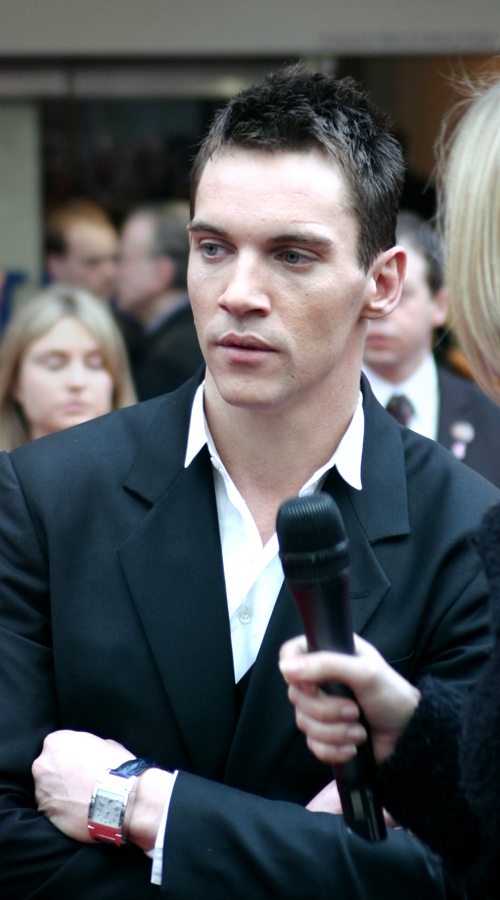
The film's principal cast, clockwise from top left: Madeleine Stowe, Mischa Barton, Jonathan Rhys Meyers, and Norman Reedus

Madeleine Stowe was cast in the lead role of single mother Senga Wilson. Commenting on the role, Stowe said: "My character has a very short fuse, she's a drug addict and an insomniac and very high-strung. I thought it was a very bold choice, trying to hang a thriller on a woman with these qualities. She's also trying to hang on to her daughter, but her daughter is rebelling against her."

Norman Reedus, who portrays the unnamed "Recovery man," stated of his role: "I’ve done so many bad guys that I thought it would be nice to try to play a hero, you know, for once. But the hero in this movie, you can’t really tell if he’s going to kill somebody or if he’s going to save somebody or... and it’s nice. It’s a weird movie."

=== Filming ===
Though set in the United States, Octane was shot in Luxembourg on a budget of approximately US$10.5 million–$11.5 million, culled from five films investors. Principal photography for the film began on 3 June 2002. The production company chose Luxembourg as a shooting location based on a 12 km (7.5 mi) stretch of highway that had been recently paved and had yet to open to the public, which made it a feasible location for the film's numerous road sequences.

Because the film is set in the United States, a team of contractors were appointed to paint yellow and white dividing lines on the road for it to appear as an American highway. A total of thirty American cars and fifteen American semi-trucks were imported from both England and the United States to be used in the film.

== Release ==
The film's production company, the independent United Kingdom distributor Random Harvest, sold the film for distribution to the Walt Disney Pictures-owned Buena Vista International under their subsidiary Four Horseman Films.

Octane premiered in the United States at the CineVegas Film Festival on 25 June 2003. It was subsequently given a theatrical release in the United Kingdom on 14 November 2003.

=== Home media ===
First Look Entertainment released the film on DVD in the United States under the alternative title Pulse on 20 July 2004.

== Reception ==
=== Critical response ===
On Rotten Tomatoes, the film has a 17% approval rating based on reviews from 6 critics. Scott Foundas of Variety noted: "Even were the performers not so disinterested, Volk’s screenplay not so hopelessly didactic about its “message” and the Luxembourg setting not so suggestive of tax-credit incentives run amok, it might be hard to watch Octane with a straight face...[its] murky, frequently under-lit widescreen lensing and comatose cutting are the perfect complements to pic's overall dreariness." Adam Keen of Film Review awarded the film three stars out of four, noting: "Octane is a thriller that fits loosely in a genre occupied by Duel, Roadkill and Jeepers Creepers, is a suspenseful, visceral feast that preys on our worst fears of the open road." TV Guide awarded the film one out of five stars, calling it an "incoherent horror flick."

Jamie Russell of the BBC wrote that the film "plays like an American studio picture," and criticized its "incomprehensible" script, ultimately awarding it one out of five stars. William Thomas of Empire praised the film's first act, but added: "Its failing, surprisingly for a film so perfect for B-movie shocks, is pretension. [Director] Adams seems reluctant to simply tell the story and gets muddled in an onslaught of Lynchian surrealism. Unlike Lynch, though, the weirdness is neither imaginative nor elegant enough to spark interest in what it actually means, and the third act - with Jonathan Rhys-Meyers as another effete weirdo - is not only dull, but also utterly baffling." Derek Malcolm of The Guardian praised the film's atmosphere and cinematography, but criticised the screenplay, noting that, "in the end, the whole thing becomes almost totally absurd." Uncut magazine noted that director Adams "does a good job of establishing the eerie, lonely atmosphere of late-night motorways and service-stations" but "falls asleep at the wheel and collides with an entirely different film, one in which Jonathan Rhys-Meyers hosts a sexy dance party in a lorry, an enigmatic character called the Recovery Man (Norman Reedus) does stuff that makes no sense, and Stowe blows things up in a laboratory."

Mike Goodridge of Screen Daily praised Stowe's performance as "suitably caustic" and added film: "Adams has a confident visual style, effectively capturing Senga's moments of dozy consciousness before nodding off. Indeed her half-awake, half-asleep state could have been used to more dramatic effect to heighten the ambiguity of the plot a la Gaslight or Suspicion. Nevertheless, Stowe's strident and underused screen presence makes it eminently watchable and helps lift Octane out of the ordinary."

== Music ==
Octane (OST)

Soundtrack album by Orbital
- Released: 28 October 2003
- Genre: Electronica
- Label: EMI
- Producers: Orbital; Simon Boswell

Orbital chronology
Work 1989-2002 (2002)	Octane (OST) (2003)	Blue Album (2004)

Octane's soundtrack consists mainly of techno, ambient and ambient industrial music by Orbital. Though Orbital had contributed tracks to other feature films, this was the first film for which they composed the full soundtrack. The soundtrack was released on 28 October 2003.

=== Track listing ===
No.	Title	Length
1.	"Octane"	1:30
2.	"Through the Night"	5:18
3.	"Strangeness in the Night"	3:20
4.	"Preacher"	1:35
5.	"Moment of Crisis"	2:42
6.	"Frantic"	2:04
7.	"Breaking & Entering"	2:40
8.	"Chasing the Tanker"	1:25
9.	"Total Paranoia"	4:08
10.	"Confrontation"	2:50
11.	"Initiation"	4:19
12.	"Meet the Father"	5:01
13.	"Blood is Thicker"	3:09
14.	"The Road Ahead"	2:58

== Sources ==
- Muir, John Kenneth (2023). Horror Films of 2000-2009. Jefferson, North Carolina: McFarland & Company. ISBN 978-1-476-64450-9.
