= Blue Album (Orbital album) =

Studio album by Orbital
- Released: 21 June 2004
- Genre: Techno, ambient techno, acid house
- Length: 52:01
- Label: Orbital Music; ATO (US)
- Producer: Paul and Phil Hartnoll

Orbital chronology
Octane (OST) (2003)	Blue Album (2004)	Halcyon (Best Of) (2005)

Professional ratings
Aggregate scores
Source	Rating
Metacritic	69/100
Review scores
Source	Rating
AllMusic	2.5/5 stars
The Guardian	3/5 stars
NME	4/10
Pitchfork	7.3/10
Q	3.5/5 stars
Release Magazine	8/10
Resident Advisor	4.5/5 stars
Rolling Stone	4/5 stars
Uncut	3.5/5 stars
Under the Radar	9/10

The Blue Album (released 21 June 2004) is the seventh studio album from the British electronica duo Orbital. It includes their single "One Perfect Sunrise". The album was released on CD and LP formats. Orbital announced that this would be their "final" album at the time, but subsequently reunited and recorded new music from 2009 onwards.

== Album ==
Blue Album's title recalls the informal names of Orbital's first two, self-titled albums, known colloquially as the Green Album and the Brown Album. "You Lot" samples a speech by Christopher Eccleston from Russell T Davies' The Second Coming.

== Track listing ==
No.	Title	Length
1.	"Transient"	5:48
2.	"Pants"	5:45
3.	"Tunnel Vision"	4:27
4.	"Lost"	5:08
5.	"You Lot"	7:08
6.	"Bath Time"	4:18
7.	"Acid Pants" (featuring Sparks)	6:31
8.	"Easy Serv"	4:09
9.	"One Perfect Sunrise" (featuring Lisa Gerrard)	8:45
