= Optical Delusion =

Studio album by Orbital
- Released: 17 February 2023
- Length: 51:07
- Label: Orbital
- Producer: Orbital

Orbital chronology
30 Something (2022)	Optical Delusion (2023)

Singles from Optical Delusion
- 1. "Dirty Rat" Released: 20 October 2022; 2. "Ringa Ringa (The Old Pandemic Folk Song)" Released: 7 December 2022; 3. "Are You Alive?" Released: 1 February 2023

Optical Delusion is the tenth studio album by English electronic music duo Orbital, released on 17 February 2023.

== Reception ==
Optical Delusion ratings
Aggregate scores
Source	Rating
AnyDecentMusic?	7.1/10
Metacritic	71/100
Review scores
Source	Rating
AllMusic	3.5/5 stars
The Arts Desk	4/5 stars
Clash	8/10
The Guardian	3/5 stars
Louder Than War	4/5 stars
Mojo	4/5 stars
PopMatters	7/10
Record Collector	4/5 stars
Slant Magazine	3.5/5 stars
Uncut	7/10

According to the review aggregator Metacritic, Optical Delusion received "generally favorable reviews" based on a weighted average score of 71 out of 100 from 10 critic scores.

The Guardian gave the album a 3/5, calling it a "sterling comeback," praising the guest artists, and commending the instrumental tracks.

=== Year-end lists ===
Optical Delusion on year-end lists
Publication	#	Ref.
Louder Than War	80	

== Track listing ==
All tracks are written by Paul Hartnoll except where noted.

Optical Delusion track listing
No.	Title	Writer(s)	Length
1.	"Ringa Ringa (The Old Pandemic Folk Song)" (featuring Mediæval Bæbes)		4:14
2.	"Day One" (featuring Dina Ipavic)		5:16
3.	"Are You Alive?" (featuring Penelope Isles)	Jack Wolter; Lily Wolter; Paul Hartnoll	7:49
4.	"You Are the Frequency" (featuring the Little Pest)	Jimmy Day; Lily De Brouwer; Phil Hartnoll	4:39
5.	"The New Abnormal"		5:05
6.	"Home" (featuring Anna B Savage)	Anna B Savage; Paul Hartnoll	5:18
7.	"Dirty Rat" (with Sleaford Mods)		5:16
8.	"Requiem for the Pre-Apocalypse"		5:20
9.	"What a Surprise" (featuring the Little Pest)	Jimmy Day; Phil Hartnoll	3:51
10.	"Moon Princess" (featuring Coppe)	Jimmy Day; Miller Y. Coppe; Phil Hartnoll	4:19
Total length:			51:07

== Personnel ==
- Orbital – producer (1–8, 10)
- Paul Hartnoll – producer (7)
- Andrew Fearn – producer (7)
- Mediæval Bæbes – vocals (1)
- Dina Ipavic – vocals (2)
- Penelope Isles – vocals (3)
- The Little Pest – vocals (4, 9)
- Anna B Savage – vocals (6)
- Coppe – vocals (10)

== Charts ==
Chart performance for Optical Delusion
Chart (2023)	Peak position
Australian Physical Albums (ARIA)	32
Belgian Albums (Ultratop Flanders)	70
Irish Albums (IRMA)	83
Scottish Albums (Official Charts)	4
UK Albums (Official Charts)	6
UK Dance Albums (Official Charts)	1
UK Independent Albums (Official Charts)	2
