= Lush 3 =

Single by Orbital

from the album Orbital (1993 album)
- Released: August 1993
- Genre: Techno
- Label: Internal Records
- Songwriter: P&P Hartnoll
- Producers: P&P Hartnoll

Orbital singles chronology
"Halcyon" (1992)	"Lush 3" (1993)	"Diversions" (1994)

"Lush 3" is a single from British electronic band Orbital. It was released in August 1993.

The main two tracks "Lush 3-1" and "Lush 3-2" feature on Orbital's 1993 Brown Album, plus there are remixes from Underworld, Psychick Warriors ov Gaia and CJ Bolland.

In May 2025, Confidence Man re-worked the song as "Re-Lush" as part of the re-release of the 1993 album.

== Artwork ==
The sleeve was designed by Grant Fultano (Fultano 93) with photography by Sally Harding. The video by Rob Shackleton is set at a car boot sale.

== Track listing ==
- 1. "Lush 3-1" (5:39)
- 2. "Lush 3-2" (4:41)
- 3. "Lush 3-3 Underworld" (12:38)
- 4. "Lush 3-4 Warrior Drift Psychick Warriors Ov Gaia" (10:48)
- 5. "Lush 3-5 CJ Bolland" (6:14)

"Lush 3-1" and "Lush 3-2" play as a continuous piece, though they have separate indices.

== Charts ==
Year (1993)	Peak position
UK Singles (Official Charts)	43
