= The Middle of Nowhere (Orbital album) =

Studio album by Orbital
- Released: 5 April 1999
- Recorded: 1997–1998
- Genres: Ambient techno; house
- Length: 63:59
- Labels: FFRR; London/Sire Records (US)
- Producer: Orbital

Orbital chronology
In Sides (1996)	The Middle of Nowhere (1999)	The Altogether (2001)

Singles from The Middle of Nowhere
- 1. "Style" Released: 8 March 1999; 2. "Nothing Left" Released: 5 July 1999

The Middle of Nowhere is the fifth album released by Orbital. It was released in 1999, where it peaked at #4 and spent 7 weeks in the UK albums chart.

== Album ==
The track "Know Where to Run" was featured in the PlayStation game Wipeout 3.

Orbital came up with the name "Style" for track 8 because of the frequent use of the Stylophone in the track.

While released on 5 April 1999, it was finished much earlier, and unspecified problems led to the record label delaying its release for nearly 6 months.

=== Samples ===
- A small section from John Baker's "New Worlds", which also featured in John Craven's Newsround, was sampled for "Spare Parts Express".
- The track "Spare Parts Express" contains a sample from the movie Carnival of Souls containing the line "Why can't anybody hear me?"
- The vocal samples in "I Don't Know You People" are taken from the film The Legend of Hell House.
- The vocal sample in "Style" ("Now I'm aching for you") is taken from "O L'amour" by Dollar.

== Reception ==
Professional ratings
Review scores
Source	Rating
AllMusic	4/5 stars
Entertainment Weekly	B+
The Guardian	4/5 stars
The Independent	5/5 stars
Melody Maker	4.5/5 stars
Muzik	3/5 stars
NME	8/10
Pitchfork	7.6/10
Rolling Stone	3.5/5 stars
Spin	7/10

John Bush of AllMusic noted that "even considering the lack of real progression in sound, Middle of Nowhere reflects the pair once again making all the right moves and not slowing down a bit," giving the album four stars out of five. Mark Bautz's review for Entertainment Weekly concluded that ravers should take note, as the album, "which has the goods to become this summer's feel-good record...will soon be everywhere," giving the album the grade of B+. NME gave the album the score of 8/10 and concluded that "this, if you want it, is therapy. As the boundaries of the future and the beyond are slowly mapped and planned, it's the confines of the skull the Hartnoll brothers are delicately probing here. It might take you a while, but you'll get there in the end. The middle of nowhere is always closer than you think."

Rolling Stone gave the album three and a half stars out of five, saying the "songs meld into each other as they would during a DJ set, female vocalists moan in and out of the mix, and syncopated rhythms dance the funky robot. You'll do the same." Almost Cool rated the album 7.5/10, telling readers that "if you've listened to much Orbital at all, the disc will probably sound familiar to you the first time you listen to it. It's not to say that it isn't innovative or interesting, but there's a quality about it like you haven't seen a good friend in awhile and they're just telling you some new stories. If there's ever an electronic music hall-of-fame, these guys had better get in there in a dang hurry," while Spin Magazine noted how "in the high-turnover world of dance culture, Orbital...[craft] tunes that sing in your heart." Perhaps the most praise came from Melody Maker, who awarded the album four and a half stars, telling readers the album is "their best yet."

== Track listing ==
All tracks are written by Paul Hartnoll & Phil Hartnoll unless stated.

No.	Title	Writer(s)	Additional performers	Length
1.	"Way Out →"	Paul 88, Phil Hartnoll, Barbara Cohen, Paul Robb	Brother Sun Sister Moon	8:00
2.	"Spare Parts Express"			10:07
3.	"Know Where to Run"			9:42
4.	"I Don't Know You People"			7:47
5.	"Otoño"	Hartnoll, Hartnoll, Natasha Jones, Sharon Lewis	Pooka	5:48
6.	"Nothing Left 1"		Alison Goldfrapp	7:49
7.	"Nothing Left 2"		Alison Goldfrapp	8:21
8.	"Style"			6:24

== Certifications ==
Region	Certification	Certified units/sales
United Kingdom (BPI)	Silver	60,000^{^}
^{^} Shipments figures based on certification alone.
