= Orbital: Live at Glastonbury 1994–2004 =

Live album by Orbital
- Released: June 14, 2007
- Recorded: 1994–2004
- Genre: Electronica
- Label: ACP Recordings
- Producer: Paul and Phil Hartnoll

Orbital chronology
Halcyon (Best Of) (2005)	Orbital: Live at Glastonbury 1994–2004 (2007)	Orbital 20 (2009)

Orbital: Live at Glastonbury 1994–2004 is a collection of rare live recordings containing over two hours of music and video recorded from Orbital's performances at the Glastonbury Festival over a decade.

The DVD has the same track listing as the two CDs (16:9 NTSC video, uncompressed LPCM audio). It offers chapter stops, but has no chapter menu.

== Track listing ==
=== CD 1 ===
1. "Walk Now" (1994)
2. "Are We Here?" (1994)
3. "Attached" (1994)
4. "Kein Trink Wasser" (1995)
5. "Impact (The Earth Is Burning)" (1995)
6. "Remind" (1995)
7. "Halcyon" (1999)
8. "The Box" (1999)

=== CD 2 ===
1. "Style" / "Bagpipe Style" (1999)
2. "The Girl with the Sun in Her Head" (2002)
3. "Funny Break (Weekend Ravers)" (2002)
4. "Belfast" (2002)
5. "Frenetic" (2002)
6. "Satan" (2004)
7. "Dr. Who?" (2004)
8. "Chime" (2004)

=== DVD ===
1. "Walk Now" (1994)
2. "Are We Here?" (1994)
3. "Attached" (1994)
4. "Kein Trink Wasser" (1995)
5. "Impact (The Earth Is Burning)" (1995)
6. "Remind" (1995)
7. "Halcyon" (1999)
8. "The Box" (1999)
9. "Style / Bagpipe Style" (1999)
10. "The Girl with the Sun in Her Head" (2002)
11. "Funny Break (Weekend Ravers)" (2002)
12. "Belfast" (2002)
13. "Frenetic" (2002)
14. "Satan" (2004)
15. "Dr Who?" (2004)
16. "Chime" (2004)
