= The Box (Orbital song) =

Single by Orbital

from the album In Sides
- Released: 15 April 1996
- Genre: Electronica
- Length: 4:13 (radio edit); 12:28 (album version)
- Label: Internal
- Songwriter: Paul Hartnoll
- Producer: Orbital

Orbital singles chronology
"Times Fly (EP)" (1995)	"The Box" (1996)	"Satan Live" (1996)

"The Box" is a single by the British electronica duo Orbital. Taken from their 1996 album In Sides, the single was released in 1996 and reached number 11 on the UK Singles Chart.

== Song ==
Paul Hartnoll told the NME that the song was based on a recurring dream he had about the discovery of a mysterious wooden box in the Welsh countryside, but that he would always wake up just at the point he was opening the box, so he never found out what was inside it.

"The Box" was released in two versions and six arrangements, each divided into parts. The version released on In Sides is in two parts, a slow downbeat "Part 1" and a faster upbeat "Part 2" of the same song.

The longer single version of The Box is in four parts, all of which are untitled. The first is a short edit of the album version, as used in the music video. The second and third parts are new songs which share certain melody, harpsichord, and percussion elements with the first. On the CD single, these first three parts are segued/mixed into each other.

The final part consists of a vocal version of "The Box" similar to "Part 2" of the album version, with additional vocals by Grant Fulton and Alison Goldfrapp. The lyrics were written by Fulton, who previously contributed lyrics and vocals to the Orbital compilation single "Belfast"/"Wasted", and is one half of the design duo Fultano Mauder regularly responsible for artwork on Orbital releases.

== Critical reception ==
British magazine Music Week rated the song five out of five, adding, "The most commercial track by the Hartnoll Brothers for many years, combining a film theme feel and a fully-fledged vocal track for the first time in one of the extended mixes. Odds on to be their biggest hit since 1990's number 17, Chime."

== Music video ==
The stop-motion promotional video for "The Box" stars actress Tilda Swinton as "The Traveler", a person (or an alien) unstuck from time. The Traveler phases into existence, witnesses human life in public transit and traffic, as well as its effects on nature, seen through detritus in a river and a plant sapling growing through a brick wall. They return to their origin point, giving one final sad glance backwards before disappearing.

According to co-director Jes Benstock, the stop motion concept was inspired by "Neighbours by Norman McLaren, as well as a great Australian animation called Palisade", while the style of the video borrowed heavily from Nicolas Roeg’s The Man Who Fell to Earth, which starred David Bowie – "the main character is wearing a pilot’s hat and a long coat."

Orbital's Phil and Paul Hartnoll also make a split-second appearance in the video, in a laneway scene.

The video won a silver sphere for the best short film at the San Francisco Film Festival and was nominated for the best video award at the 1997 Brit Awards. It was also shown in the Mirrorball strand of the Edinburgh International Film Festival and in the London Calling section of the London International Film Festival. In a 2002 sleeve note, Orbital called the video "by common consent, the best video we've ever done".

== Use in the media ==
Part of the song was used in the Danny Boyle 1997 film A Life Less Ordinary, but was not on the soundtrack. The song was also used in the final episode of Daria, "Boxing Daria", and for some of the challenges on the BBC game show Friends Like These. The 2002 video game Hitman 2: Silent Assassin has a version of "The Box" as the main screen and intro song.

A portion of the song was used in Mike Myers' 2022 Netflix miniseries The Pentaverate, as the main theme or intro song. Furthermore, the band composed a complete score for the series.

== Track listing ==
CD – Internal – LIECD 30

1. "The Box (Radio Edit)" – 4:13
2. "The Box (Untitled Version 1)" – 7:46
3. "The Box (Untitled Version 2)" – 8:40
4. "The Box (Vocal Reprise)" – 7:36
  - Subtrack titles can't be found on the release, they are taken from the official Orbital website www.loopz.co.uk. 2 and 3 are listed as 'Untitled Version'.

== Charts ==
Chart (1996)	Peak position
Netherlands (Dutch Single Tip)	8
UK Singles (Official Charts Company)	11
