= The Altogether =

Studio album by Orbital
- Released: 30 April 2001
- Length: 62:40 (UK) / 70:26 (US second disc)
- Labels: FFRR; London/Sire (US)
- Producer: Orbital

Orbital chronology
The Middle of Nowhere (1999)	The Altogether (2001)	Work 1989–2002 (2002)

US edition cover

Professional ratings
Aggregate scores
Source	Rating
Metacritic	66/100
Review scores
Source	Rating
AllMusic	2/5 stars
Alternative Press	3.5/5 stars
Blender	3/5 stars
Mojo	3.5/5 stars
Muzik	5/5 stars
NME	5/10
Pitchfork	5.2/10
Q	3/5 stars
Request	75/100
Rolling Stone	3/5 stars
URB	4/5 stars

The Altogether is Orbital's sixth studio album and was released in 2001. It features guest vocals by Phil Hartnoll's brother-in-law David Gray, a sampled Ian Dury, a sample from "Sober" by Tool and a version of the Doctor Who theme. It was Orbital's last studio album for FFRR and received a mixed critical reception.

Describing the album shortly before it was released, Phil Hartnoll said, "Whereas Middle of Nowhere was written for a detached mood, for sitting in a field and listening to by yourself, The Altogether is for listening to at a party with your mates. That's what I take it to mean anyway. Paul thinks it's about not having any clothes on."

As of 2001, it had sold 135,000 copies worldwide. As of 2004, the album had sold 58,000 copies in United States.

The album features a remix of the iconic Doctor Who theme titled "Doctor?" This track later featured in a 2010 Glastonbury Festival show set, featuring the Eleventh Doctor Matt Smith as a special guest.

== Track listing ==
=== UK edition ===
No.	Title	Length
1.	"Tension"	5:53
2.	"Funny Break (One Is Enough)"	4:55
3.	"Oi!"	5:04
4.	"Pay Per View"	5:11
5.	"Tootled"	4:51
6.	"Last Thing"	5:12
7.	"Doctor?"	5:30
8.	"Shadows"	5:48
9.	"Waving Not Drowning"	4:31
10.	"Illuminate" (featuring David Gray)	5:27
11.	"Meltdown"	10:18

=== US edition ===
For the US release, the album was given a double-disc treatment, with many of the songs on the second disc being B-sides from various other releases. This version remains the standard US release.

Disc 2
No.	Title	Length
1.	"Bigpipe Style"	5:16
2.	"Monorail"	6:18
3.	"Much Ado About Nothing Left"	5:13
4.	"An Fhomhair"	6:59
5.	"Doctor Look Out"	5:13
6.	"Beelzebeat"	8:26
7.	"Nothing Left Out"	6:04
8.	"Old Style"	5:55
9.	"Funny Break" (Weekend Ravers Mix)	8:28
10.	"Mock Tudor"	7:38
11.	"New Style"	4:56

=== DVD version ===
Because "The Strongroom" (Orbital's London studio run by the unofficial "third member", their producer Mickey Mann) had capabilities for mixing surround audio they decided to make a DVD release of The Altogether. The DVD is very rich in content and has an extensive navigation that invites the viewer to explore and try out various things to find hidden features, for example in the video to "Shadows" there are different angles available. The DVD features some fake commercials and an imaginary children's programme called "Play Factory" (in the video for "Waving Not Drowning"), which includes actor Brian Cant in a similar role to that as presenter of Play School.

It features mixed audio in stereo, Dolby Digital 5.1 and DTS 5.1. The bonus tracks "Meltdown", "Doctor?" and the hidden track "Monorail" (not mentioned on the cover) are Dolby Digital 5.1 only.

No.	Title	Extras	Length
1.	"Tension"	alternative live footage	6:19
2.	"Funny Break (One Is Enough)" (shortened)	Funny Peculiar (the making of Funny Break)	3:57
3.	"Oi!"		5:04
4.	"Pay Per View"	• alternative audio: footage sound • the commercials from "Pay Per View"	5:09
5.	"Tootled"		4:50
6.	"Last Thing"		5:12
7.	"Shadows"	multiple angles	6:01
8.	"Waving Not Drowning"	out-takes/behind-the-scenes (6 versions)	4:30
9.	"Illuminate" (featuring David Gray)		5:27

Bonus tracks
No.	Title	Extras	Length
10.	"Doctor?"	multiple angles	5:32
11.	"Meltdown" (extended)		22:00
12.	"Monorail"	multiple angles	6:37

== "Tension" ==
"The track grew out of incidental music we were doing for this BBC Two film [by photographer Nick Waplington for the TX series]," Paul Hartnoll told Q. "We had this '50s vocal sample and then decided to put a sort of surf guitar thing on top. It gives it this Batman-type feel. We decided to call it techno-skiffle or something." A sample from The Trashmen's "Surfin' Bird" is featured.
