= III (Orbital EP) =

EP by Orbital
- Released: 7 January 1991
- Recorded: 1990
- Genre: Electronica
- Label: FFRR
- Producer: P&P Hartnoll

Orbital EP chronology
III (1991)	Mutations EP (1992)

III is an EP released by the techno duo Orbital. The title has a double meaning, referring to it being their third single release, and having three tracks. Two of the group's best known tracks, "Satan" and "Belfast", made their first appearances on the EP. "Belfast" was first discovered by David Holmes and Ian McCready when they booked Orbital to play their "Space Base 4" night at the Art College in Belfast on 12 May 1990. Orbital left a demo tape which included the track that was subsequently named "Belfast" in recognition of the positive experience they'd had in the city.

== Samples ==
"Satan" features samples from "Sweat Loaf" by punk band Butthole Surfers.

"Belfast" uses a sample of soprano Emily Van Evera performing "O Euchari" from the Gothic Voices album A Feather on the Breath of God. The same sample had appeared on The Beloved's hit "The Sun Rising" a year earlier, but had not been credited.

"LC1" includes a sample of television presenter Fred Dinenage reading a report of an alleged alien abduction.

== Other versions ==
A version of "Belfast" with vocals by Grant Fulton called "Belfast/Wasted (Wasted Vocal Mix)" was included on the magazine/compilation Volume Three in 1992. In 1995, the version was released as a single (with music video), backed by a Therapy? track, and included on the Volume "Best of" compilation Wasted.

Orbital's 1996 single Satan Live includes a version of "Satan" called "Satan (Industry Standard Edit)", as well as live versions recorded at New York City's Irving Plaza and at the V96 Festival in Chelmsford.

In 1997, Orbital re-recorded Satan with Metallica guitarist Kirk Hammett, for the Spawn movie soundtrack.

In 1999, Orbital released "Belfast (Sasha vs The Light Remix)" and "Nothing Left" as a double-A side 12 inch vinyl, and a rejected remix, "Belfunk", was released on Sasha's Xpander EP.

In 2015, Paul Hartnoll shared a 4 track demo version of "Belfast" from 1990 on his blog, along with "The Other One", an unfinished demo made with elements of "Chime" and "Belfast".

In 2021, during the promotion of their then upcoming 2022 remix/rework compilation album 30 Something, the duo released digital singles with new remixes of "Belfast" and "Satan".

== Accolades ==
Q Magazine chose "Belfast" as one of its 1001 Best Songs ever.

== Track listing ==
=== CD and 12" vinyl version ===
"Satan"
"LC1"
"Belfast"

=== 7" vinyl version ===
"Satan"
"Belfast"

=== 12" remix version ===
"Satan (The Rhyme & Reason Vocal Mix)"
"LC2 (Outer Limits Mix)"
"Chime"

=== Belfast/Wasted (1995 CD and 12" vinyl) ===
Orbital – "Belfast/Wasted (Wasted Vocal Mix)"
Therapy? – "Innocent X (Remix)"

=== 2024 Digital version (remastered) ===
"Satan"
"L.C.1"
"Belfast"
"Satan (The Rhyme & Reason Vocal Mix)"
"LC2 (Outer Limits Mix)"
"Chime"
