= Chime (Orbital song) =

Single by Orbital
- Released: December 1989 / 12 March 1990 (re-release)
- Recorded: 1989
- Genre: EDM; techno
- Length: 3:14 (edit); 12:40 (12" version)
- Label: FFRR
- Songwriter: P&P Hartnoll
- Producers: P&P Hartnoll

Orbital singles chronology
"Chime" (1989)	"Omen" (1990)

"Chime" is the debut single from the British electronic group Orbital. It was originally recorded on cassette tape and allegedly cost less than £1 to produce. The track was originally released in December 1989 and was a big underground success. On 12 March 1990, it had a wider release on FFRR Records, and reached number 17 on the UK Singles Chart.

The track has been referred to as the British equivalent to Derrick May's seminal classic "Strings of Life" and was included at number 11 on Mixmag magazine's "100 Greatest Dance Singles of All Time". Mixmag also included it on two "best ever dance" compilations, "B!g Tunes: The Greatest Dance Singles of All Time" (2001) and "The Greatest Dance Tracks of All Time" (2013).

== Creation ==
According to Paul Hartnoll, the track was recorded in Orbital's "under the stairs" home studio – "a knocked-through stair cupboard that my dad set up as a home office" in Sevenoaks, Kent. Key amongst the band's equipment at this time was their Roland TB-303 synthesiser which had been acquired for £100 from a northern working men's club keyboard player who was living in London.

Paul stated that he recorded "Chime" in the home studio before he went down to the pub. He played the cassette to pirate DJ Jazzy M at his record store in London. The DJ loved the track but insisted that it be extended for another couple of minutes. The tape recorder they recorded the track onto ran too fast, resulting in it being slightly slower than intended when played back on other decks. The track ended being 12 mins 40 after largely reprising the first half and improvising with the drum machine and TB-303 synth. The B-side of the record was the track "Deeper", featuring samples from a spoken-word relaxation record.

The original pressing (the first on Jazzy M's Oh'Zone records) of 1,000 records sold out quickly. Record labels clamoured to give "Chime" a full release and in the end they went with Pete Tong's FFRR record label. An edited version was produced and created in a more professional studio. It was downsized using fewer elements from the original 12-inch version, shortening it to 3 minutes and 14 seconds.

== Top of the Pops ==
The track made the top 40 of the British charts and Orbital made their first TV appearance performing live on BBC TV's Top of the Pops show in March 1990. They appeared wearing Anti-Poll Tax T-shirts. The brothers wanted to play live but the show's producers stated that they had to mime. The band were embarrassed about having to do so and thought that the dancer they were provided with was also bored. They stood around on stage and did not even pretend to mime, and as a protest they had positioned the power plugs for their equipment on top of it to show that they were not powered. The show's production staff did not invite Orbital back on for another six years. After the appearance, the tune went six places up the chart to number 17.

Although not their highest-charting song, "Chime" was the song that brought them to a mainstream audience. It is the duo's fifth highest charting single.

== Live airplay ==
"Chime" is still regularly played live by the band, usually as a medley of the original version and the "Chime Crime" mix from the Mutations EP. The band often use it to end a set.

== Legacy ==
In 1996, "Chime" was ranked number 11 on Mixmag magazine's "100 Greatest Dance Singles of All Time". In 2001 and 2013, Mixmag also included it on their "B!g Tunes: The Greatest Dance Singles of All Time" and "The Greatest Dance Tracks of All Time". In 2015, LA Weekly ranked it number two in their list of "The 20 Best Dance Music Tracks in History", writing, "Electronic dance music may have been born in Detroit and Chicago, but only when it jumped the pond to England did it explode into a global phenomenon. Of the songs that soundtracked that explosion, Orbital's 'Chime' may be the most iconic." In 2022, Rolling Stone ranked it number 143 in their list of the "200 Greatest Dance Songs of All Time". In 2025, Billboard magazine ranked it number 38 in their list of "The 100 Best Dance Songs of All Time".

== Versions of "Chime" ==
There are numerous versions and remixes of "Chime". Orbital themselves have done several. Below is a list of them:

- Orbital
  - Original version – 1989
  - "Helium Mix" – 1990
  - "Chime Crime" – 1992
  - "Live Style Mix" – 2002
  - "Christmas Chime" – 2013
  - "30 Something Years Later Mix" - 2022
- JZJ – 1990
  - "Bacardi Mix"
  - "Oh Yah Mix"
- "Friends of Matthew Mix" – 1991
- Ray Keith Mutation Mix – 1992
- Joey Beltram & Program 2 – 1992
- Mike Flowers – 1997
  - "Krisp DoubleU Mix"
  - "Hairy Butter Mix"
- Knuckleheadz – 2006
- The Shapeshifters – 2008, and remixes of that version by:
  - Martijn Ten Velden – 2008
  - Henrik B – 2008
  - Moudaber Bombarge – 2008
- Special Request - 2021
- Eli Brown - 2022
- Octave One - 2022

== Track listings ==
=== Oh'Zone Records – December 1989 ===
- 12" vinyl
1. "Chime" (12:42)
2. "Deeper" (15:33)

=== FFRR – March 1990 ===
- 12" vinyl
1. "Chime" (12:38)
2. "Deeper" (Edit) (6:55)
- 12" vinyl (The Remixes)
1. "Chime" (JZJ Bacardi Remix) (6:23)
2. "Chime" (JZJ Oh Ya Mix) (6:28)
- 7" vinyl

A. "Chime" (Edit) (3:15)
B. "Deeper" (Edit) (4:05)

- CD single
1. "Chime" (Edit) (3:15)
2. "Chime" (12-inch version) (12:40)
3. "Deeper" (Edit) (4:06)
- Cassette single
1. "Chime" (Edit) (3:15)
2. "Deeper" (Edit) (4:05)

== Charts ==
=== Weekly charts ===
Chart (1990)	Peak position
Europe (Eurochart Hot 100)	49
UK Singles (OCC)	17
US Hot Dance Club Play (Billboard)	23

=== Year-end charts ===
Chart (1990)	Position
UK Club Chart (Record Mirror)	24
