= Orbital (1993 album) =

Studio album by Orbital
- Released: 24 May 1993
- Genres: Techno; dance
- Length: 65:44
- Labels: Internal; FFRR
- Producer: Orbital

Orbital chronology
Orbital (1991)	Orbital (1993)	Snivilisation (1994)

Singles from Orbital
- 1. "Halcyon" Released: September 1992; 2. "Lush 3" Released: August 1993

Orbital (also known as Orbital 2 or the Brown Album) is the second studio album by English electronic music duo Orbital, released on 24 May 1993 by Internal and FFRR Records. Like the duo's debut album, the album was officially untitled.

The album peaked at number 28 on the UK Albums Chart.

== Album ==
The album begins with "Time Becomes", which uses the same speech sample by the actor Michael Dorn in Star Trek: The Next Generation ("Time Squared" – season 2 episode 13: "There is the theory of the Möbius. A twist in the fabric of space where time becomes a loop") which opened their first album. The piece uses phasing, a technique popularised by Steve Reich, in which two identical samples are repeated at slightly different speeds. The brothers enjoy aural puns, and the use of this sample again, as well as the muffled intro on "Planet of the Shapes" with intentional addition of record static and crackles, followed by the sound of a needle skipping grooves then scratching across the record, was meant to trick fans who bought the vinyl edition into thinking their copy had defects.

The second song on the album, "Planet of the Shapes", contains a sample from the movie Withnail & I ("even a stopped clock gives the right time twice a day").

The duo aimed to make more atmospheric music than the dance raves of their first album. They used more complex rhythms and denser arrangements on the pieces entitled "Lush".

"Impact" samples the line "It's like... like a cry for survival. A cry for survival. For their survival and for our survival!" from "a French film dubbed into English" with a "conspiracy, alien plot" that the band did not remember the name of. It is taken from an English dub of the French animated film Fantastic Planet (La Planète sauvage) (1973).

Meat Beat Manifesto were an influence on the album, after Orbital toured with the group in the United States ahead of recording it. The breakbeat on "Impact" was provided by Jack Dangers and "Remind" is an instrumental re-recording of Orbital's "Mind the Bend the Mind" remix of "Mindstream" by Meat Beat Manifesto, which removed all elements of "Mindstream" from the piece. The remix and final work was inspired by the Fabio Paras remix of React 2 Rhythm's "I Know You Like It".

"Walk Now..." samples the sound of a Sydney zebra crossing alert and a didgeridoo, which were both recorded after a trip to Australia to perform at an illegal rave named Welcome 92.

"Halcyon + On + On" is a slightly shorter, more upbeat and melodic remix of their 1992 song "Halcyon". The title is inspired by a contemporary advertising slogan used by the Ariston washing machine company ("Ariston + on + on").

== Critical reception ==
Professional ratings
Review scores
Source	Rating
AllMusic	5/5 stars
Encyclopedia of Popular Music	4/5 stars
Entertainment Weekly	A
NME	9/10
Q	4/5 stars
The Rolling Stone Album Guide	4/5 stars
Select	4/5 stars
Slant Magazine	4/5 stars
The Village Voice	C+
Vox	8/10

The album received widespread acclaim. In the UK, NME praised the record, saying, "The techno album is a doughty brute to master. Only a few have managed it successfully [...] but Phil and Paul Hartnoll have done it twice... The expression 'intelligent ambience' is bandied around to describe spacey dance music with undue regularity, but Untitled actually satisfies the description. Scientific and terrific." Q also recognised that the duo had made a second successful album, saying, "Like their first album, Orbital's current effort is a finely balanced combination of muso trickery and astute dance tracks... Again, like the latter, it benefits from repeated listening." Select stated that "the marvel is that they create such vastness in your ear from micro-minimalist ingredients", and described the record as "infinitely inventive, unique in its conception and electronically sexy".

Melody Maker claimed that "This new album (untitled, like the first) puts them firmly back in the firmament". In a reference to Suede and their sexually ambiguous frontman Brett Anderson, and including a pun on the Sex Pistols' single "Anarchy in the U.K.", the review concluded, "As warm as plasma and as eerie as ectoplasm, Orbital's (out-of-)body-music is the true sound of Androgyny-in-the-UK." Vox observed that "this collection sees Paul and Phil Hartnoll drifting still further into the heart of the machine, touching upon the sometimes fragile soul of Techno", before declaring that "Orbital are still leading the field".

=== Accolades ===
This album is included in the book 1001 Albums You Must Hear Before You Die alongside their 1994 LP Snivilisation. Along with 1996's In Sides, it was also included in Q magazine's "90 Best Albums of the 1990s". In 1996, Mixmag ranked the album at number nine in its list of the "50 Best Dance Albums of All Time". In 1999, Ned Raggett of Freaky Trigger ranked the album at number 21 on his list of "The Top 136 or So Albums of the Nineties". Tom Ewing, also of Freaky Trigger, ranked it 87th on his own list, calling it the only fine progressive house album.

== Track listing ==
1. "Time Becomes" – 1:43
2. "Planet of the Shapes" – 9:36
3. "Lush 3-1" – 5:39
4. "Lush 3-2" – 4:40
5. "Impact (The Earth Is Burning)" – 10:27
6. "Remind" – 7:57
7. "Walk Now..." – 6:48
8. "Monday" – 7:05
9. "Halcyon + On + On" – 9:28
10. "Input Out" – 2:11

On cassette, "Planet of the Shapes" was re-titled "Planet of the Tapes" and placed as the first song on side two, before "Walk Now..." in the track listing; the track is identical.

The title "Planet of the Shapes" is also a reference to the 1968 film Planet of the Apes.

== Use in other media ==
"Halcyon + On + On" and parts of "Lush 3-2" were used in the 1995 Mortal Kombat film soundtrack. The 1995 movie Hackers also used the track "Halcyon + On + On". The ending of the 2004 movie Mean Girls uses the song "Halcyon + On + On" in the final scene. The ending of the 2018 movie Teen Spirit also used the song "Halcyon + On + On".

== Charts ==
Chart performance for Orbital
Chart (2025)	Peak position
Belgian Albums (Ultratop Flanders)	117
Scottish Albums (Official Charts)	5
UK Albums (Official Charts)	13
UK Dance Albums (Official Charts)	2
UK Independent Albums (Official Charts)	5
