= In Sides =

Studio album by Orbital
- Released: 29 April 1996
- Studios: The Strongroom, London
- Length: 72:02
- Label: Internal/FFRR
- Producer: Paul and Phil Hartnoll

Orbital chronology
Snivilisation (1994)	In Sides (1996)	The Middle of Nowhere (1999)

Singles from In Sides
- 1. "The Box" Released: 15 April 1996

In Sides is the fourth album by British electronic group Orbital, released in the UK on Internal on 29 April 1996.

The album's title is a reference to the fact that the original vinyl LP release of the album was as a 3-LP vinyl box set, with one track per side of each disc. In Sides saw the band continue the process begun on their previous album Snivilisation of moving away from making music for the rave scene towards more intricately crafted melodies and reflective, downtempo tracks. Gathering widespread acclaim not just from dance music magazines but also the UK's more traditional rock music papers such as NME and Melody Maker, the album is considered by many reviewers and fans to be among Orbital's best work.

The album spent 12 weeks in the UK charts in 1996, and reached a high of No. 5 in the week of its release.

== Release history ==
Several versions of the album have been released. The original UK vinyl LP release in April 1996 consisted of six tracks, one track on each side of a 3-LP set. For the CD version the tracks "The Box" and "Out There Somewhere?" were each split into two parts, creating eight tracks. In the US the first 30,000 copies of the album came packaged with a second bonus disc which included the four tracks from the 1995 Times Fly EP and the four versions of "The Box" from the single merged as a single 28-minute track – none of the five tracks had been available in the US up to that point.

In May 1997 the album was re-released in the UK with the then-current single "The Saint" added on to the end of the CD album. The vinyl re-release was a 4-LP box set, featuring the three LPs of the original release and a fourth LP with "The Saint" on one side and its B-side "The Sinner" on the other. The US version of the re-released album contained a different bonus CD to the 1996 version, featuring both tracks of "The Saint" single along with live recordings of "Halcyon" and "Satan" (previously found on Orbital's III EP and the Satan Live EP respectively).

== Background and recording ==
The album was recorded at Orbital's rented studio space at The Strongroom in central London. It was mostly programmed and recorded on Apple Mac computers using Logic Audio software and an E-mu Emax 2 E64 sampler. Various analogue synthesizers were also used to create the album, such as the ARP 2600, Roland SH-101, Oberheim Xpander and Roland Jupiter-6. A Roland TR-808 drum machine was used, but many tracks sampled the Hartnolls' friend Clune drumming live instead: Phil Hartnoll told Music Week, "We recorded him with about 15 mics [microphones] playing along to click tracks and doing things on his own".

The vocals on three of the album's tracks are credited to "Auntie", a pseudonym used by long-time collaborator Alison Goldfrapp on this release. Her singing on "Dŵr Budr" is nonsensical chanting, and has been rumoured to have been played backwards, which the band finally confirmed in 2020.

== Music and lyrics ==
The album was preceded by a single, "The Box", starring the actress Tilda Swinton in the single's video. Paul Hartnoll told the NME that the song was based on a recurring dream he had about the discovery of a mysterious wooden box in the Welsh countryside, but that he would always wake up just at the point he was opening the box, so he never found out what was inside it.

Environmental concerns are one of the major themes of the album: "Dŵr Budr", Welsh for "dirty water", was inspired by the Sea Empress oil spill environmental disaster which took place just off the southern coast of Wales in February 1996. Paul Hartnoll told Vox, "We came up with the chords that start the track, and I thought: 'That sounds nice, it sounds like the sea'. And it reminded me of staring at the murky water in Brighton from one of the sea-breakers, thinking, 'Uh! God!' So I thought: 'Let's make this track about the horrible dirty water that everybody has to swim in.'" The song was written and recorded in a single day before the album's scheduled mastering.

An early version of the album's opening track "The Girl with the Sun in Her Head" was recorded for the Hackers film soundtrack, but was not included in the film. The final piece was entirely recorded using electricity provided by Greenpeace's mobile solar power generator, Cyrus. It is dedicated to the memory of Volume magazine photographer Sally Harding, a friend of the Hartnolls, who died in December 1995. It opens with an emulated heartbeat sound created with an ARP 2600, which serves as bass and develops into what many critics hold as one of Orbital's most accomplished pieces.

"P.E.T.R.O.L." was written and recorded for the video game Wipeout (and included on its later soundtrack album); it is also featured on the soundtrack to the film π. "Adnan's" is a longer version of the track originally included on 1995's charity album The Help Album, benefitting War Child. Paul Hartnoll said that "the name comes from the sympathy story of the day on the news about a family evacuated from the former Yugoslavia. The father had to stay behind to work, and his 16-year-old son decided he had to go back and stay with him. He felt he couldn't leave him on his own. After a few days the son, Adnan, got blown up and killed."

The two-part closing track "Out There Somewhere?" deals with another of the Hartnolls' preoccupations, science fiction and extraterrestrials. Paul said, "I was looking for samples from this TV programme about the way people react to UFOs. It's not about UFOs, it's about that spiritual gap being filled by the aliens coming down to save us... Then the second half is the euphoria of what the person wants to feel when they've been abducted."

== Artwork ==
The album's cover art is by John Greenwood, who is also responsible for creating the covers of previous Orbital releases. The collage for the internal artwork was created by Foul End Trauma, an anagrammatical alias for the design artists Fultano Mauder. The design group also contribute lyrics to the vocal version of "The Box" on the single's release, with one half of the group, Grant Fulton, providing vocals.

== Critical reception ==
Professional ratings
Review scores
Source	Rating
AllMusic	4.5/5 stars
Entertainment Weekly	B+
The Guardian	4/5 stars
Los Angeles Times	3/4 stars
Muzik	4.5/5 stars
NME	9/10
Pitchfork	9.1/10
Q	4/5 stars
Rolling Stone	3/5 stars
Select	5/5

The album was positively received by critics. The leading UK dance music magazines Mixmag and Muzik were enthusiastic, with Mixmag saying that "Orbital are still light-years ahead of the competition" while Muzik said that "billed as six unrelated 'sound scenarios', In Sides neatly illustrates why Orbital remain light years ahead of the competition. While much of the album is set on a dial marked 'home listening', it is still some way in front of the soporific easy-listening muzak of much of today's ambient fare. At times, it startles with its raw simplicity, while at others it impresses with its sheer complexity. But in the end, what it comes down to is that only Orbital could mix 'n' match the simple and the complex and turn out something this good. After all these years, they're still ahead of the pack. Way ahead."

The more guitar-orientated rock magazines were equally impressed. NME said that "after the undeniable but heavy-handed gravitas of Snivilisation, In Sides feels like an emphatic retreat into the personal domain. Despite its many shifts in temper, the prevailing demeanour is one of sensitivity to the eddies of life's swollen stream... In Sides is the best of Orbital thus far. It refines their previous tricks further taking them into the realm of what now feels dangerously close to perfection, while also standing tall and utterly distinct from both its contemporaries and historic predecessors." David Bennun of Melody Maker called In Sides "a very approachable record" and awarded it a "recommended" star rating. He noted that the album was not as intense as its predecessors and said, "It strikes me as simply a sweet experience, an infusion of mild pleasure to the body and brain. Maybe the Hartnolls needed a rest from all that rage and anomie. Maybe I should just call it the first beautiful album of the summer." Q wrote that "on this, their fourth album, Orbital explore six unrelated sound scenarios, from the veiled, shimmering passion of "The Box", with its layer upon layer of chimes, to the rich orchestral moods of "Out There Somewhere", a 24-minute track underpinned by a firm, focussed beat. More anchored and evocative than the preceding Snivilisation, In Sides is not just about intelligent abstraction and a wicked tempo."

Vox said that "Orbital are maturing and expanding without losing the plot. There's a newly mellow mood to these grandiose electronic vistas, but the brothers are stopping to admire the view rather than rest their aching bones. They no longer make dance music for people who don't dance, but they are making soundtracks for movies which don't exist... Some might feel it lacks the coherent overall feel and irreverent, idea-stuffed urgency which made Snivilisation such a milestone. But at their inspired best, as they are for a good three-quarters of In Sides, Orbital transport you to a glistening sensurround universe unlike anything else in pop." Select said "the word [techno] already seems too small to encompass what this band is about... On the evidence of In Sides, it's easy to see them going on to make music every bit as moving and lastingly satisfying as the dance records that got them started, and as emblematic of their time as the punk records they listened to before that". In The Guardian, David Bennun stated that "In Sides has a lightness and lucidity that is rare in the rather solemn world of dance music". He described the work of the Hartnoll brothers as "a kind of sequencer origami, tucking their tracks into intriguing shapes" and that "the result is more than an intellectual exercise for the connoisseur of electronics. As pop music, it's thrilling." He concluded, "Few albums merit repeated exploration; even fewer reward it so generously."

=== Accolades ===
By late May 1996, over 60,000 copies of the album had been sold. The album was certified gold by the BPI in January 1997 for sales of 100,000 copies in the UK. As of 2004, the album had sold 158,000 copies in United States.

Publication	Country	Albums of the Year 1996	Rank
Melody Maker	United Kingdom	"Albums of the Year"	31
Mixmag	United Kingdom	"Best of 1996"	3
Muzik	United Kingdom	"Albums of the Year"	16
NME	United Kingdom	"1996 NME Albums"	3

The single "The Box" also made NME's list of the best singles of 1996, coming in at number five.

In Sides was also included in Q magazine's "90 Best albums of the 1990s".

== Track listing ==
All tracks written by Paul and Phil Hartnoll, except where noted.

No.	Title	Length
1.	"The Girl with the Sun in Her Head"	10:26
2.	"P.E.T.R.O.L."	6:17
3.	"The Box (Part 1)"	6:28
4.	"The Box (Part 2)"	6:00
5.	"Dŵr Budr"	9:55
6.	"Adnan's"	8:41
7.	"Out There Somewhere? (Part 1)"	10:42
8.	"Out There Somewhere? (Part 2)"	13:26

- On vinyl, "The Box" and "Out There Somewhere" are not separated into parts.

1997 UK and Europe re-release

No.	Title	Writer(s)	Length
9.	"The Saint"	Edwin Astley	4:30

1996 US bonus disc

No.	Title	Writer(s)	Length
1.	"Times Fly (Slow)"		7:58
2.	"Sad but New"		7:29
3.	"Times Fly (Fast)"		7:53
4.	"The Tranquilizer"		6:27
5.	"The Box" (full version)	Hartnoll; Hartnoll; Grant Fulton; Peter Mauder	28:11

1997 US bonus disc

No.	Title	Writer(s)	Length
1.	"Satan (Industry Standard)"		3:42
2.	"Satan" (live at NYC Irving Plaza)		7:09
3.	"The Saint"	Edwin Astley	4:30
4.	"The Sinner"		10:41
5.	"Halcyon" (live at NYC Irving Plaza)		8:43

== Additional personnel ==
- Auntie (Alison Goldfrapp) – vocals
- Clune – drumming
