= Snivilisation =

Studio album by Orbital
- Released: 8 August 1994
- Recorded: 1993–94
- Genres: Techno; ambient techno
- Length: 75:04
- Label: FFRR
- Producer: Orbital

Orbital chronology
Orbital (1993)	Snivilisation (1994)	In Sides (1996)

Snivilisation is the third studio album by the British electronic music duo Orbital. It was released on 8 August 1994 through FFRR Records.

The album peaked at number 4 on the UK Albums Chart, and had sold over 80,000 copies in the United Kingdom by April 1996.

Professional ratings
Review scores
Source	Rating
AllMusic	4/5 stars
Encyclopedia of Popular Music	4/5 stars
Music Week	4/5 stars
NME	9/10
Q	3/5 stars
The Rolling Stone Album Guide	4/5 stars
Select	4/5 stars

== Background ==
The band released the album at the time of the launch of the Criminal Justice Act, the legislation that gave British Police greater legal powers to break up unlicensed raves that gave Orbital its name. The Are We Here? single featured the track "Are We Here? (Criminal Justice Bill?)", which consists of four minutes of complete silence.

"Philosophy by Numbers" samples Sidney Stratton's chemistry experiment, "Guggle Glub Gurgle", from the film The Man in the White Suit.

"Are We Here?" samples a part of "Man at C&A" by The Specials; the track's vocals are by Alison Goldfrapp, as on "Sad But True". "Are We Here?" is also on Work 1989-2002.

The album was included in Q magazine's "The 25 Best Dance Albums Ever" in October 1997. It also made Q's end-of-year top 10 best albums list in 1994.

== Track listing ==
No.	Title	Length
1.	"Forever"	7:59
2.	"I Wish I Had Duck Feet"	4:05
3.	"Sad But True" (featuring Alison Goldfrapp)	7:49
4.	"Crash and Carry"	4:43
5.	"Science Friction"	5:03
6.	"Philosophy by Numbers"	6:39
7.	"Kein Trink Wasser"	9:24
8.	"Quality Seconds"	1:25
9.	"Are We Here?" (featuring Alison Goldfrapp)	15:33
10.	"Attached"	12:25
