= Orbital (band) =

English electronic music duo

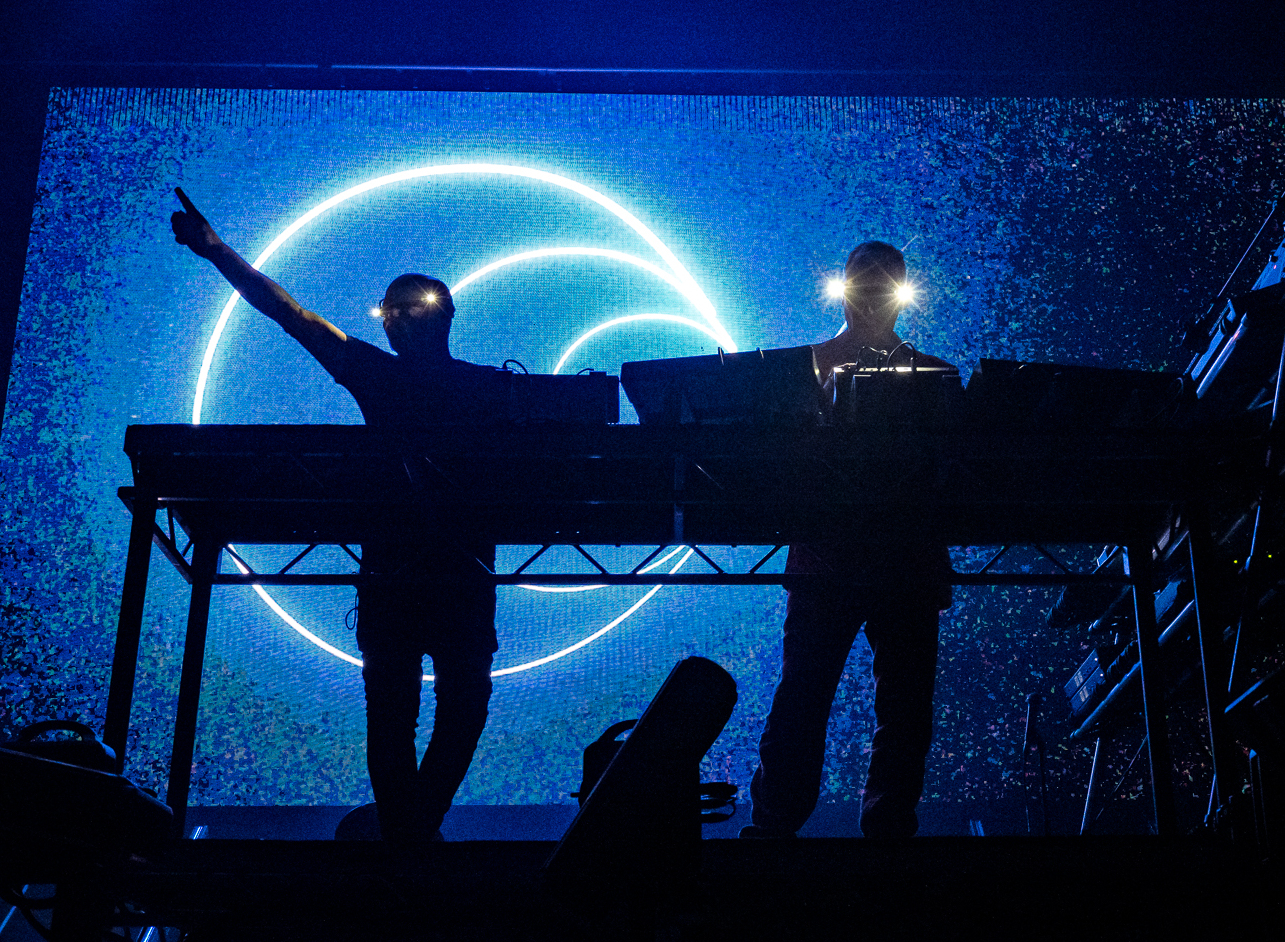
- Orbital performing at the Brighton Centre in 2023

Background information
- Origin: Otford, Kent, England, United Kingdom
- Genres: Electronic; techno; trance; IDM; ambient; breakbeat
- Years active: 1987; 1989–2004; 2009–2014; 2017–present
- Labels: FFRR; Internal
- Members: Phil Hartnoll; Paul Hartnoll
- Website: orbitalofficial.com

Orbital are an English electronic music duo from Dunton Green, Kent, England, consisting of brothers Phil and Paul Hartnoll. The band's name is taken from Greater London's orbital motorway, the M25, which was central to the early rave scene during the early days of acid house. Additionally, the cover art on three of their albums showcase stylised atomic orbitals. Orbital have been critically and commercially successful, known particularly for their live improvisation during shows.

== Career ==
=== Early years and influences ===
Logo of Orbital, used since 1991

The Hartnolls' formative influences included Kraftwerk, OMD, Depeche Mode, Steel Pulse, Cabaret Voltaire, Kate Bush and the Beat. Paul described the early incarnation of Orbital as a "low-cost bedroom New Order/Severed Heads". The pair also drew inspiration from classic rock bands like Deep Purple, Led Zeppelin and Genesis, as well as the catalogues of Tamla Motown, ZTT and Trojan Records.

In 1989, Orbital recorded "Chime" on their father's 4-track tape deck, which they released on DJ Jazzy M's Oh Zone Records in December 1989, and re-released on FFRR Records three years later. The track became a rave anthem, reaching number 17 in the UK charts and earning them an appearance on Top of the Pops, during which they wore anti-Poll Tax T-shirts. According to Paul Hartnoll, the track was recorded "under the stairs" of their parents' house in "a knocked-through stair cupboard that my dad set up as a home office". The track received its first live airing at a club night hosted by the promoter Que Pasa (Mark, Andrew and Nick Maddox) in a local Sevenoaks venue called the Grasshopper on Boxing Day. Next was a gig at the Town and Country 2 in Islington, performing for the first time under the name Orbital. Several singles and EPs followed, and their first self-titled album, a collection of tracks recorded at various times, was released in late 1991.

In late 1992, the Radiccio EP barely reached the UK top 40, although it included one of their most popular songs, "Halcyon". The track featured a sample of Kirsty Hawkshaw from "It's a Fine Day" (a chart hit for Opus III earlier that year). The B-side "The Naked and the Dead" was similarly based on a line from Scott Walker's rendition of Jacques Brel's song "Next". "Halcyon" was dedicated to the Hartnolls' mother, who was addicted to the tranquiliser Halcion (Triazolam) for many years.

The duo's popularity grew rapidly with the release of their second self-titled album, in 1993. The album included complex arrangements and textures, opening with the two-minute track "Time Becomes". The track consisted of two slightly delayed, looped samples of a line from the Star Trek: The Next Generation episode "Time Squared" spoken by actor Michael Dorn as the character Lieutenant Worf: "... where time becomes a loop" being played simultaneously through the left and right channels, respectively (until one cycle of phase difference has happened). The same sample was used at the beginning of "the Moebius", the opening track on the previous album. This audio pun was intended to make listeners believe that they had bought a mis-pressed album (Orbital 1 packaged as Orbital 2). The album reached No. 28 on the UK albums chart, staying in the chart for 15 weeks. "Halcyon" was remixed for the album, as "Halcyon + On + On". Versions of this song played live by the band have incorporated diverse samples, including "You Give Love a Bad Name" by the band Bon Jovi, "Heaven Is a Place on Earth" by Belinda Carlisle, and in 2004 "I Believe in a Thing Called Love" by the band The Darkness.

The first two albums are commonly known as "The Green Album" and "The Brown Album", after the colours of their covers (although the first album's cover is yellow, one of the first printings had a misprint causing the cover to be yellow-green).

=== 1994 breakthrough ===
Orbital won an NME award for Vibes Best Dance Act early in 1994, but it was their headline appearance at the Glastonbury Festival on 25 June 1994 that brought them most attention. Q magazine classed it as one of the top 50 gigs of all time, and in 2002 included Orbital in their list of "50 Bands to See Before You Die".

Crucially, the expanded TV coverage of the 1994 Glastonbury Festival by Channel 4 meant that Orbital's set reached a huge audience, in what is regarded as a pivotal moment. Speaking to The Guardian in 2013 about the gig, Paul Hartnoll commented: "I didn't know how much of an impact it would have. Being young myself, I just thought, 'It's about time – of course we should have acid house at Glastonbury'. It used to annoy me. I just used to think it should be happening."

Orbital gave an improvisational element to live electronic music as the brothers mixed and sequenced their tracks on the fly, wearing their trademark head-mounted torches behind banks of equipment. Orbital were one of the few electronic acts invited to play at Woodstock '94.

The third album, Snivilisation, was released in August 1994. Alison Goldfrapp provided vocals on a couple of the tracks, including the single "Are We Here?". This track also included a sample from "Man at C&A" by The Specials. Among the remixes of "Are We Here?" was "Criminal Justice Bill?" – four minutes of silence, a reference to the Criminal Justice and Public Order Act 1994, which was in part intended to clamp down on the rave scene which had given birth to Orbital. The other track with Goldfrapp vocals, "Sad But True", was remixed for the Times Fly EP, the band's only release in 1995.

The single "The Box" was released in April 1996, reaching number 11 in the UK, and its parent album In Sides, released in May 1996, became their second Top Five album. In Sides has since come to be one of their most critically well-regarded works. As with the previous album, there was a vague theme of ecological disaster and dissatisfaction with society.

The following year, the duo contributed to film soundtracks (The Saint, Event Horizon, Spawn) and enjoyed the biggest singles of their career, with a live version of "Satan" and their reworking of the aforementioned The Saint theme both reaching number three in the UK. The In Sides track "Out There Somewhere (Part 2)" was also included in the long-awaited game series relaunch of Test Drive 4.

Orbital contributed to the Mortal Kombat film soundtrack, which reached Platinum selling status during 1995: a remix of "Halcyon" can be heard during the final scene of the film.

Orbital headlined Organic '96 Music Festival on 22 June 1996 at the Snow Valley Ski Resort in Running Springs, California. This festival also featured Underworld, Chemical Brothers, The Orb, and Meat Beat Manifesto.

=== Later albums ===
In 1998, they returned to the studio to work on their fifth album The Middle of Nowhere. This was released in 1999, becoming their third top five album, and was a return to a more upbeat style; with Alison Goldfrapp returning on vocals and the single "Style" using the stylophone. In 2000 the single "Beached" was released from the soundtrack to the film The Beach, mixing the brothers' musical style with a melody by Angelo Badalamenti and the words of Leonardo DiCaprio from the film.

The Altogether, released in 2001, included guest vocals by the Hartnolls' brother-in-law David Gray, a sampled Ian Dury, and a version of the Doctor Who theme, and was mixed for 5.1 surround sound. It was to be their last album for FFRR, and had a mixed critical reception. The following year, Work 1989-2002 collected various singles from "Chime" onwards. Orbital recorded the track "Technologique Park" for the 2002 film XXX, in which they can be seen playing the track live in a club.

In 2003, Orbital recorded the soundtrack for the horror film Octane.

Orbital split up in 2004. They played a final series of gigs in June and July 2004 at the Glastonbury Festival, the T in the Park Festival in Scotland, the Oxegen festival in Ireland, Istanbul, Turkey and the Wire Festival in Japan, concluding with a live Peel Session gig at Maida Vale Studios in London on 28 July 2004. The release of their seventh and last original album, Blue Album, coincided with this final wave of shows. The album included Sparks (on "Acid Pants") and Lisa Gerrard (on the final single, "One Perfect Sunrise").

=== Following the breakup ===
Paul Hartnoll continued to record music under his own name, including tracks for the 2005 game Wipeout Pure for the PSP. He released his first solo album, The Ideal Condition, on the ACP record label in June 2007. Alongside Flood, he also jointly produced Strength in Numbers by band The Music.

Phil Hartnoll formed a new electronica duo, Long Range, with Nick Smith. Their debut album, Madness and Me, was released on their own label, Long Range Recordings, in August 2007. Orbital released a two-CD/DVD compilation Orbital: Live at Glastonbury 1994-2004 in June 2007, containing over two hours of music recorded at their various performances at the festival.

=== Comeback and Wonky ===
On 21 November 2008, Orbital announced they would be reforming to play a gig together called "20 years after Chime" at The Big Chill Festival 2009. They preceded this show with a headline performance at RockNess 2009 in June.

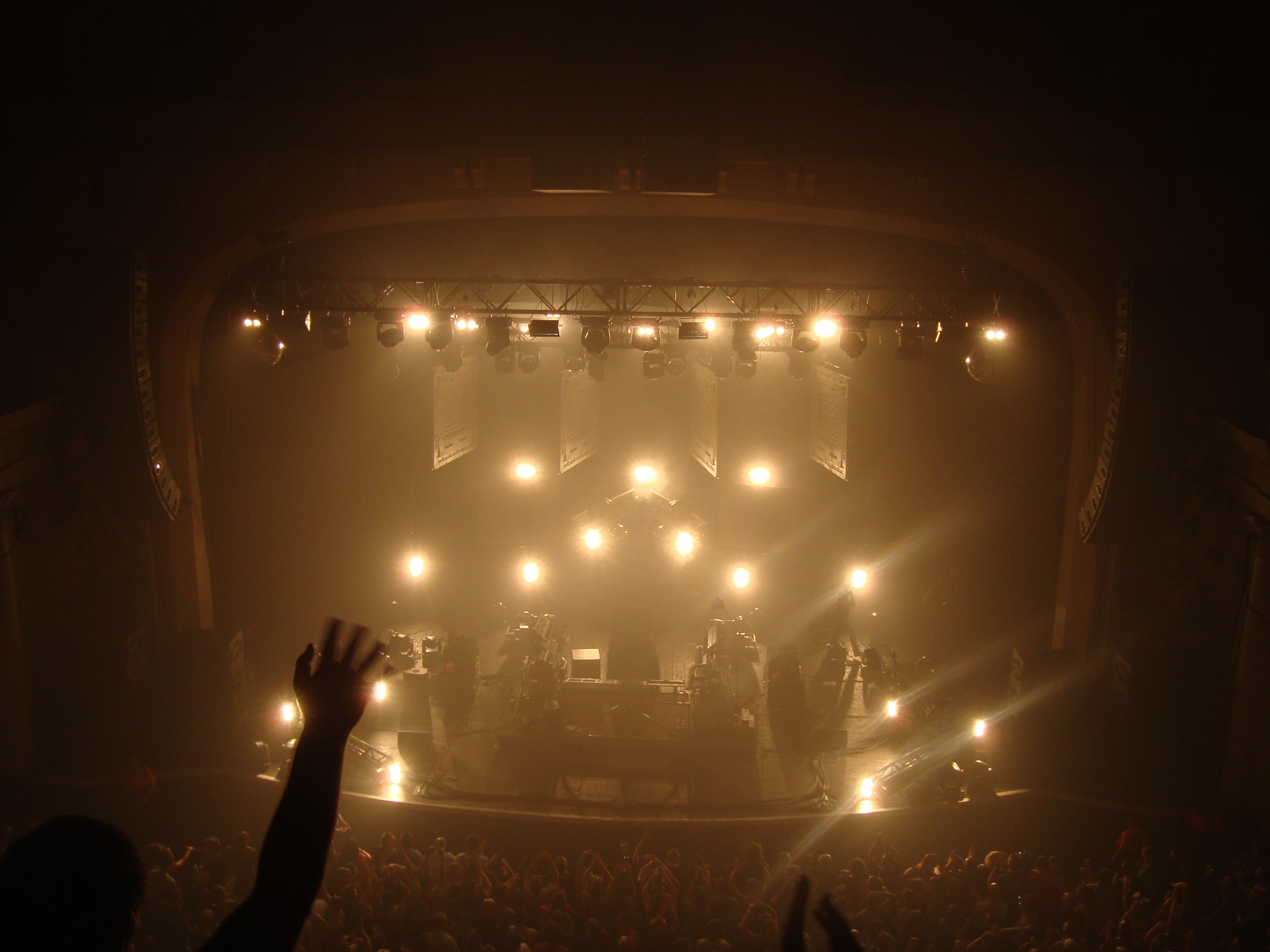
Orbital at the Brixton Academy in 2009

On 26 January 2009, their official website Loopz announced confirmed dates for their 20th anniversary tour. "The Orbital reformation gathers momentum with headline shows now confirmed for Manchester and London this September." The concerts met with positive reviews. The band's first performance after the breakup took place in June 2009 at Selector Festival in Cracow, Poland. On 17 April 2009, it was announced that Orbital would be playing at The Electric Picnic in September 2009.

On 16 June 2009, Orbital released a 2-CD collection of their favourite tracks. The collection, Orbital 20 (stylised as "20rbital"), covered the 20 years since "Chime" and contained 20 tracks. A single, "Don't Stop Me" / "The Gun is Good" was issued in 2010 on 12" and digital download. At the Glastonbury Festival on 27 June 2010 to close their set, Matt Smith, who played the Eleventh Doctor, came on stage and performed with Orbital their cover of the Doctor Who theme tune.

On 16 February 2011, Orbital posted a video diary on YouTube, via Loopz. The video diary reported their progress on the recording of their new album, along with remixes of existing material for their DJ sets. Subsequent diary updates have been published. In October 2011, Orbital announced a six gig UK tour (including a date at the Royal Albert Hall) and new album in April 2012. "Never", a track from the forthcoming album, was offered as a free download. The album titled Wonky was released on 2 April 2012, and included collaborations with singer Zola Jesus and MC Lady Leshurr. The albums release was featured on US radio on PrototypeRadio, which also marked the bands debut radio appearance on American radio.

Orbital appeared at the opening ceremony for the London 2012 Paralympic Games, performing "Where Is It Going?" live with Stephen Hawking delivering a speech about the Large Hadron Collider.

On 8 October 2012, Orbital released their soundtrack to the 2012 re-make of Pusher, including vocals from Toni Halliday.

=== Second breakup ===
On 21 October 2014, Orbital announced on their official website that they were "hanging up their iconic torch-glasses and parting ways for the final time" but would continue to work on projects separately. Phil Hartnoll focused on a DJ career, including a performance at Fuji Rock Festival, while Paul Hartnoll worked on a variety of music projects, including a solo album under the name 8:58 in 2015, a collaboration with Vince Clarke of Erasure called 2Square, and soundtrack work for Peaky Blinders and American Ultra.

=== 2017 reunion and Monsters Exist ===
In February 2017, Orbital reunited and announced tour dates in June and July, at Forbidden Fruit in Dublin, Bluedot Festival at Jodrell Bank and Standon Calling in Hertfordshire, and announced that they were working on a new album, releasing "Kinetic 2017", an updated remix of an early single, alongside the announcement. At the Bluedot Festival in July, the BBC Radiophonic Workshop joined Orbital on stage to perform "Doctor?" live, and in August 2017 the band released non-album single "Copenhagen" after working on the song during their summer live sets.

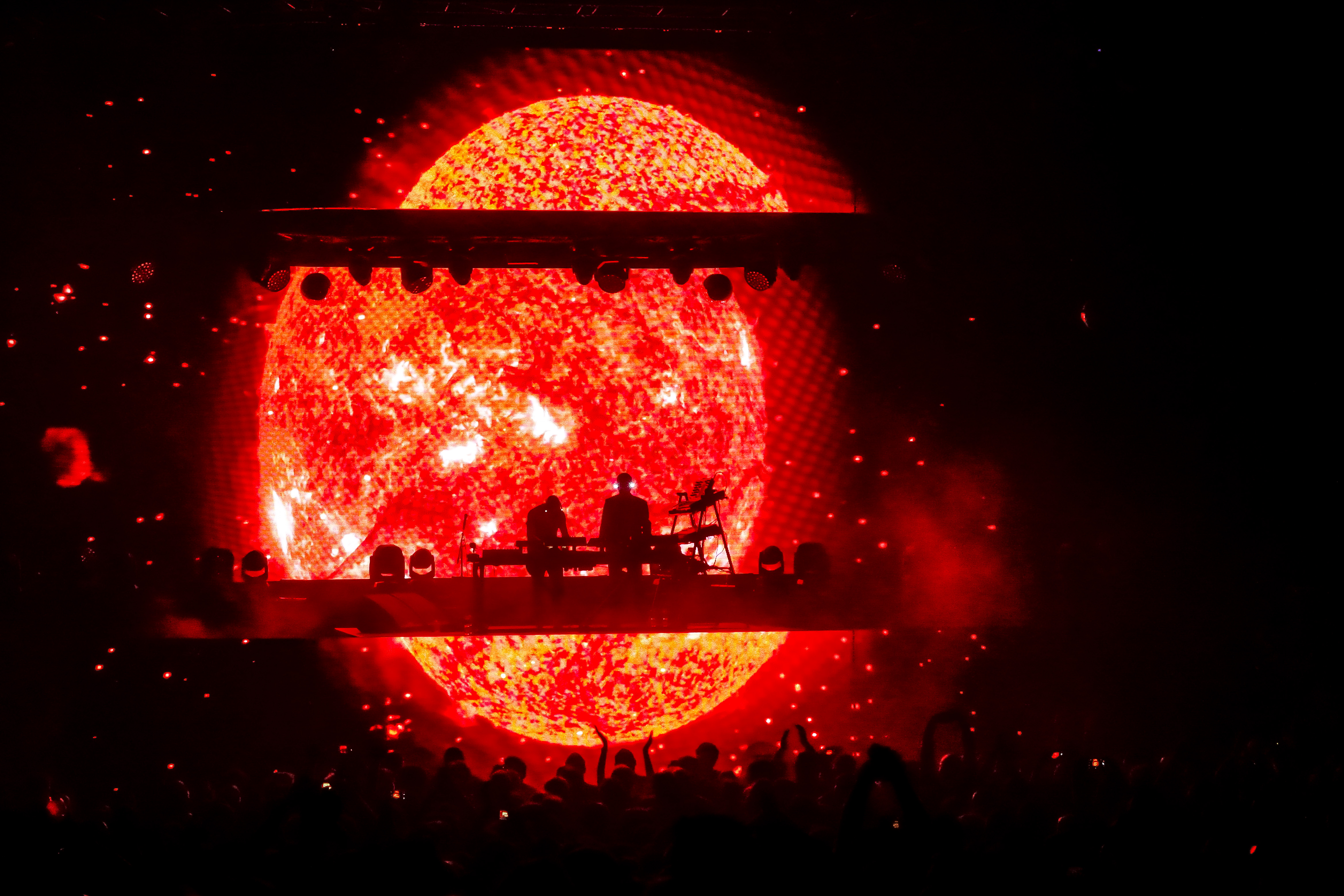
Orbital performing at Hammersmith Apollo in December 2017

In December 2017, Orbital played two sell out shows over two nights at the Manchester O2 Apollo and the London Eventim Apollo. The sets included two previously unheard songs, "Phuk" (stylised "P.H.U.K.") and "Tiny Foldable Cities". These two shows were released on CD through Pledge Music. A third previously unheard song, "The End is Nigh", was debuted May 2018 at the Biggest Weekend festival in Belfast.

A new album, entitled Monsters Exist, was released on 14 September 2018. It was the first Orbital album since In Sides to feature artwork by John Greenwood, and featured physicist Brian Cox on its final track.

In 2019, Orbital revealed plans for a 30th anniversary album, which would feature a compilation of updated versions of their songs created by themselves and their contemporaries. In early 2020, Orbital began performing two new songs tentatively titled "One Day" and "Treadmill" at live shows, including a live streamed "Stay-At-Home-Rave" hosted by United We Stream and The Haçienda, benefiting those impacted by the COVID-19 pandemic in Greater Manchester.

In 2022, the duo composed and recorded the soundtrack for the Netflix comedy series The Pentaverate created by Mike Myers. On 20 October, they announced their tenth studio album titled Optical Delusion, which was released on 17 February 2023, along with a lead single titled "Dirty Rat", featuring Sleaford Mods.

In June 2024, their performance at the Glastonbury Festival featured special guests Tilda Swinton (vocals on "Deeper") and Mel C (vocals on "Spicy").

In October 2024, they announced the release of a career-spanning compilation A Beginner's Guide on 8 November 2024.

== Political commentary ==
Throughout their career, Orbital have incorporated political and environmental commentary into their music. Early single "Choice" samples a speech against militarization from Crucifix's "Annihilation". The track "Forever" on Snivilisation samples a speech by Graham Crowden from the 1982 Lindsay Anderson film Britannia Hospital, in which he lambasts humankind; and "You Lot" on the Blue Album included a confrontational, partially vocoded sample of Christopher Eccleston playing the second coming of Jesus Christ in the TV two-part series The Second Coming written by Russell T Davies.

Orbital first unveiled the 1995 track "Sad But New" with a version that extensively sampled and edited John Major's 1992 Conservative Party conference speech, as part of a live broadcast on BBC Radio 1 "Interactive Radio Night", as a response to the newly passed Criminal Justice and Public Order Act 1994. Only the phrase "new age travellers" was retained in the release on the 1995 Times Fly EP.

The track "The Girl with the Sun in Her Head" from In Sides was recorded in a studio powered only by Greenpeace's mobile solar power generator, CYRUS. On the same album, "Dŵr Budr", Welsh for "dirty water", was inspired by the Sea Empress oil spill which took place just off the southern coast of Wales in February 1996.

The video for 2018 single "P.H.U.K" (off Monsters Exist) features photography taken from British news services, with loose references to Brexit, the London fatberg, the Grenfell Tower fire, moped crime, and the 2010s migrant crisis, among other current events, and the title "Please Help United Kingdom" reappearing.

Starting in 2019, live performances of the track "Impact (The Earth Is Burning)" have included a sampled speech from Swedish environmental activist Greta Thunberg, declaring "Our house is on fire. I don't want you to be hopeful. I want you to panic."

Paul Hartnoll described his intentions behind Orbital's sociopolitical messages as "quite ambiguous. Rather than making social comments, I suppose what we're doing is trying to put a score to the times we live in. I'd like to think that some of these are universal issues – the earth is still burning, even today, the world isn't fixed, and governments are still fucking idiots. I'm not saying I could do any better, but they could. With our music, we're saying 'go on then, sort it out!'"

== Private life ==
Paul Hartnoll is on the autism spectrum, while Phil Hartnoll has ADHD.

== Awards and nominations ==
Year	Awards	Work	Category	Result
1994	NME Awards	Themselves	Best Dance Act	Won
1995	NME Awards	Live Performance at Glastonbury Festival	Best Live Event	Won
1997	Brit Awards	"The Box"	Best British Video	Nominated
1998	MVPA Awards	"The Saint"	Directional Debut of the Year	Won
1998	D&AD Awards	"The Saint"	Pop Promo Video with a budget over £40.000	Wood Pencil
2019	Berlin Music Video Awards	"Tiny Foldable Cities"	Best Low Budget	Nominated
2022	UK Music Video Awards	"Smiley"	Best Dance/Electronic Video - UK	Nominated

== Discography ==
- Orbital (Green album) (1991)
- Orbital (Brown album) (1993)
- Snivilisation (1994)
- In Sides (1996)
- The Middle of Nowhere (1999)
- The Altogether (2001)
- Blue Album (2004)
- Wonky (2012)
- Monsters Exist (2018)
- Optical Delusion (2023)
- Other (2027)
