= FFRR Records =

Dance Music Record Label

- Parent company: London Recordings (1986-2002); Warner Music Group (2013-present; branding and post-2011 catalogue)
- Founded: 1986; 40 years ago (original); 2011; 15 years ago (current)
- Founder: Pete Tong
- Status: Active
- Distributors: Virgin Music Group (1986–2002 catalogue); Parlophone Records (in the UK); Warner Records (in the US); Warner Music Group (outside the UK and the US)
- Genre: Dance
- Country of origin: United Kingdom
- Location: London
- Official website: http://www.ffrrecords.com

FFRR Records (sometimes credited as Full Frequency Range Recordings) is a dance music label founded as a subsidiary of London Records in 1986, with A&R run by the British DJ Pete Tong. Originally a part of London Records' label roster, FFRR is currently a sublabel of Parlophone, a division of Warner Music Group. Its activities were mostly halted in the early 2000s, until the label was revived in 2011. Its catalog was sold off in 2017, but the label was revived a second time in 2021, this time with a new identity.

The original incarnation of FFRR was founded in 1986, and also had two subsidiaries: Double F Double R Records and Ffrreedom Records. The first singles from the label were UK releases of three Run-DMC singles in 1986, but the tone for the label's initial run was set by their A&R man Pete Tong's project, the compilation "The House Sound of Chicago III", which saw the comp series move from London Records.

Early artist releases on the label reflected the Dance genre, which then included Hip-Hop, blending together the 80s pop of Bananarama and Sabrina with US hip-hop and hip-house groups like Salt n' Pepa and Ultramagnetic MCs. Alongside these mostly singles-releases, a string of genre-defining compilations showcasing scenes like Chicago house music and the Baleraric sounds from Ibiza's dancefloors. As the label's profile grew, its label-branded compilations (with the iconic ear logo on the cover) became more notable – The Silver on Black (1989), Gold on Black (1990) and Platinum on Black (1993) showcased the wide roster of the label, and describe how it changed over time.

Orbital are probably the most notable artists that started on the label. FFRR released their records, from their eponymous debut album in 1991, to 2001's The Altogether, and the singles around and between them.

== Other labels ==
Double F Double R was a short-lived pop/trance music imprint that released a handful of titles between 2001 and 2003.

Ffrreedom was a sister-label that released mostly singles with more of a pop-dance bent.

Internal was a sub-label run by Christian Tattersfield, which released an eclectic mix of more upscale and underground offerings, including singles by UK techno act The Advent, some of Orbital's releases, cuts by CJ Bolland, Hardcore rave pioneers Genaside II, Todd Edwards and others.

The label collaborated with smaller labels on their major releases. Notable examples include Metalheadz' 1995 release of Goldie's debut album Timeless and the 1996 compilation Platinum Breakz, a compilation which importantly introduced a larger shift in Drum n' Bass from the more hectic post-Jungle sound of running breakbeat samples to the more precise and surgical sound often named Tech-Step.

When Mo-Wax published its biggest record to date, DJ Shadow's Endtroducing, the record was co-branded with FFRR, and FFRR handled many of Mo-Wax' US releases.

It also handled international versions for Andrew Weatherall's Sabres of Paradise label.

== Brand ==
The logo is considerably older than the label. The iconic ear logo first appeared on labels of records released on London Records in the late 1940s, to denote that those records had been recording with Decca's Full Frequency Range Recording process. Decca founded the first London Records in the 1940s, and London Records founded FFRR in 1986. As such the name is self-referential, the technology it references was developed by Arthur Haddy and Kenneth Wilkinson at Decca Records.

The technology was initially developed for submarine hunting during WWII, but was soon applied to the Decca's recordings. This technology advancement was hugely influential, as it moved the record industry from the grainy, tinny sound people associate with pre-WWII recordings to the clear sound people take for granted today.

In 2021, the label was re-branded, with the ear replaced by a simple word-mark logo, "ffrr" written in lower-case sans-serif, inside a circle. The new brand was designed by Graphic Designer and music producer Trevor Jackson, also known by his moniker Playgroup.

== Company ==
FFRR's parent company London was run by Roger Ames as his own 'semi-autonomous indie' from within the major label group PolyGram, so when Ames joined Warner Music as chair and CEO in 1999, London/FFRR moved to Warner with him. Releases continued through to 2001, slowing to a trickle in 2002–3, and from there until 2011, only sporadic compilations and re-issues were released with the label.

In 2011, Pete Tong and Warner revived FFRR, and put the label under the Parlophone umbrella when the latter acquired that label in 2013. In 2017, Warner Music sold London Recordings post-1979 catalogue and with it FFRR's 1986 catalogue to Because Music.

In 2019, the label was taken over by Andy Daniell, formally of Defected Records and got a relaunch in 2021 with a new updated logo created in association with designer Trevor Jackson. The first releases under this new brand identity will be DJ Morgan Geist's Storm Queen project with "For A Fool" and the "Loving Touch EP" from Burns.

== Artists ==
- Burns
- Eats Everything
- Alan Fitzpatrick
- Aaron Hibell
- Sonny Fodera
- Sam Gellaitry
- PARISI
- Diplo
- BLOND:ISH
- David Guetta
- Obskür
- James Carter
- Storm Queen
- SIDEPIECE
- Jengi
- Skin on Skin

== Former artists ==
- All Seeing I
- amillionsons
- Armand Van Helden
- Artful Dodger
- Asian Dub Foundation (Slash/FFRR)
- Basic Tape
- Berri
- Brand New Heavies
- Brother Brown
- The Carburetors
- Carl Cox
- Caterina Valente
- CJ Bolland
- Clubhouse (this act were not signed directly to ffrr, who licensed "Deep in My Heart" from Media Records)
- Cookie Crew
- D Mob
- Danny Campbell
- Dansson
- Diana Brown & Barrie K. Sharpe
- Denney
- DJ Icey
- DJ Krush
- DJ Skribble
- East Side Beat
- Electra
- Farley Jackmaster Funk
- Fine Young Cannibals (this act were signed to London, though their greatest hits collection The Finest was credited to ffrr)
- Frankie Knuckles
- Goldie
- Group Home (PayDay/FFRR)
- Oliver Heldens
- Hive
- Isotonik
- Jamie Principle
- Jay-Z (PayDay/FFRR)
- Jeru the Damaja (PayDay/FFRR)
- Joe Roberts
- June Montana
- Just Kiddin
- Lenny Fontana
- Kaliphz
- Krystal Klear
- Lil Louis
- Luke Vibert
- The Magician
- Marcel Mule
- Matrix & Futurebound
- Midnight City
- Paul Woolford
- Monteux, Pierre
- Narcotic Thrust
- Nightcrawlers (this act were initially signed to 4th & B'way and then to Arista/BMG's Final Vinyl label, though ffrr picked up the rights to the "Push the Feeling On" remixes, while John Reid was unsigned)
- O.C. (PayDay/FFRR)
- One Dove (signed to Boy's Own Productions, who licensed their album to ffrr)
- Orbital
- Power Pill
- DJ Richie Rich
- Sagat
- Salt n Pepa (Next Plateau/FFRR)
- Salt Tank
- Sander Kleinenberg
- Sasha (DJ)
- Savoy Brown Blues Band
- Shakespears Sister (Siobhan Fahey was signed to London as a member of Bananarama, with her initial 'solo' singles under this name coming under the ffrr name. In 2019, Fahey and Marcella Detroit issued new material via London)
- Shiva
- Showbiz & AG (PayDay/FFRR)
- Simon Harris
- Steve 'Silk' Hurley
- Stretch & Vern (Spot On/FFRR)
- Tinman
- Todd Edwards
- Together
- Tube & Berger
- Urban Thermo Dynamics (PayDay/FFRR)
- Utah Saints
- Vapourspace
- WC & the Madd Circle (PayDay/FFRR)
- The Watts Prophets
- XYconstant
- Yousef
- Z Factor

== See also ==
- Lists of record labels
- House music
