= Allison Reed =

American-born ice dancer (born 1994)

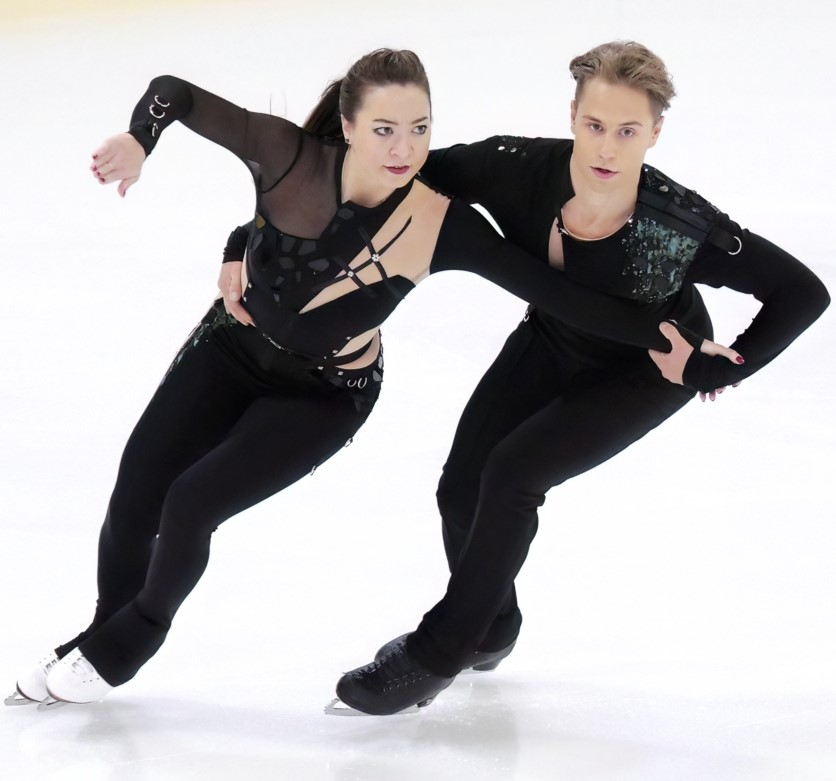
- Allison Reed and Saulius Ambrulevičius at the 2022 CS Lombardia Trophy

Personal information
- Full name: Allison Lynn Reed
- Born: June 8, 1994 (age 32) Kalamazoo, Michigan, U.S.
- Home town: Canton, Michigan, U.S.
- Height: 5 ft 4 in (1.63 m)

Figure skating career
- Country: Lithuania (since 2017); Israel (2012–15); Georgia (2009–11)
- Discipline: Ice dance
- Partner: Saulius Ambrulevičius (since 2017); Vasili Rogov (2012–15); Otar Japaridze (2009–11)
- Coach: Marie-France Dubreuil; Patrice Lauzon; Romain Haguenauer
- Skating club: Baltų Ainiai

Medal record
Representing Lithuania
European Championships
| Bronze medal – third place | 2024 Kaunas | Ice dance |
Lithuanian Championships
| Gold medal – first place | 2018 Kaunas | Ice dance |
| Gold medal – first place | 2019 Kaunas | Ice dance |
| Gold medal – first place | 2020 Kaunas | Ice dance |
| Gold medal – first place | 2021 Kaunas | Ice dance |
| Gold medal – first place | 2022 Kaunas | Ice dance |

Allison Lynn Reed (born June 8, 1994) is a Lithuanian-American ice dancer who currently competes for Lithuania with Saulius Ambrulevičius. They are the 2024 European bronze medalists, five-time ISU Grand Prix medalists, and seven-time ISU Challenger Series medalists (two golds, five silvers). They have finished in the top ten at four World Championships (2022, 2023, 2024, 2026).

She previously skated with Otar Japaridze for Georgia and with Vasili Rogov for Israel. With Japaridze, she competed at the 2010 Winter Olympics.

== Biography ==
Allison Reed was born on June 8, 1994, in Kalamazoo, Michigan, to a Japanese mother and an American father. She is the younger sister of Japanese ice dancers Cathy and Chris Reed. She grew up in Warren Township, New Jersey and attended Warren Middle School and Watchung Hills Regional High School. She received a Georgian passport in January 2010. In November 2024, Reed was granted Lithuanian citizenship by President Gitanas Nausėda. On December 17, 2024, she took the oath of allegiance at the Lithuanian embassy in Ottawa, Canada.

On March 17, 2020, Reed announced on her social media that her brother, Chris, suddenly died in Detroit, Michigan, on March 14 due to cardiac arrest. She had been training in Lithuania with her ice dance partner, Saulius Ambrulevičius, during the COVID-19 pandemic when she had learned the news. Reed credits Ambrulevičius for helping her through her grieving process. President of the JSF, Akihisa Nagashima paid tribute to Chris Reed: "I am absolutely stunned by the sad news. I would like to offer my deepest appreciation to Chris Reed for his contribution to Japanese ice dancing over the years and extend condolences to his family. May Mr. Reed rest in peace."

A memorial service was held at a Michigan funeral home on March 21, 2020, and was publicly live-streamed on numerous platforms. Her sister, Cathy, paid tribute to him in both Japanese and English: "I miss your voice. I miss your big smile. I miss holding your hand. But I'll be strong for you, Chris."

Since his death, Reed began storing a photo of her brother in her Lithuania team jacket pocket while at competitions.

== Career ==
Reed started skating in 1997 at the age of three.

=== Partnership with Japaridze ===
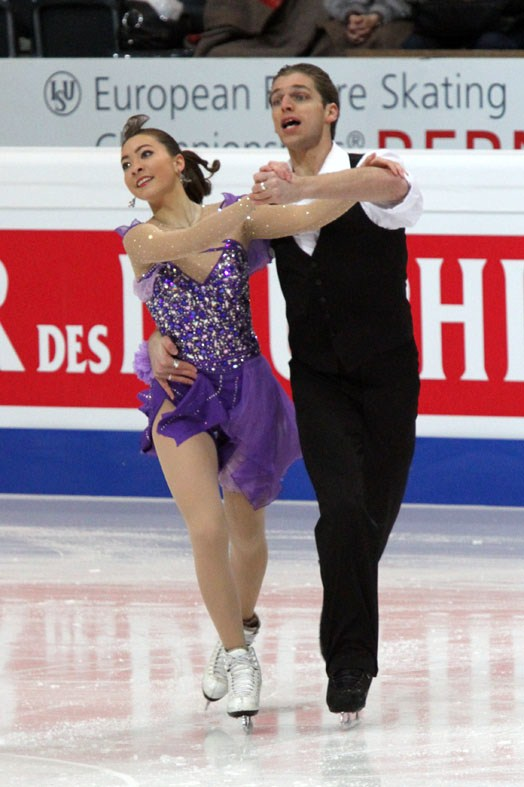
Reed and Japaridze at the 2011 European Championships

Originally a solo ice dancer, she teamed up with her first ice dancing partner, Georgia's Otar Japaridze, in May 2009. They trained in Mount Laurel, New Jersey with coach and choreographer Evgeni Platov. They qualified an entry for Georgia at the 2010 Winter Olympics at the 2009 Nebelhorn Trophy. Reed and Japaridze split following the 2010–2011 season.

=== Partnership with Rogov ===
In 2012, Reed teamed up with Vasili Rogov to compete for Israel. They withdrew from the 2013 European Championships after Rogov fell ill. Reed/Rogov went on to compete at the 2013 World Championships and finished 23rd. They dropped down to 30th at the 2014 World Championships but moved up to 20th at the 2015 World Championships in Shanghai, advancing to the Free Skate for the first time at the World Championships. Reed and Rogov announced the end of their partnership on June 24, 2015.

=== Partnership with Ambrulevičius ===
==== 2017–18 season: Debut of Reed/Ambrulevičius ====
In spring 2017, it was announced that Reed had teamed up with Lithuania's Saulius Ambrulevičius and that they would represent Lithuania, while coached by Marina Zueva, Johnny Johns, Massimo Scali, and Oleg Epstein.

They made their competitive debut at the 2017 CS Ondrej Nepela Trophy, where they finished sixth. They then went on to place seventh at the 2017 CS Nebelhorn Trophy, fifth at the 2017 Santa Claus Cup, and eighth at the 2017 CS Tallinn Trophy.

Reed/Ambrulevičius won the gold medal at the 2017–18 Lithuanian Championships. Selected to compete at the 2018 World Championships in Milan, Italy, they finished twentieth overall.

==== 2018–19 season: Grand Prix debut ====
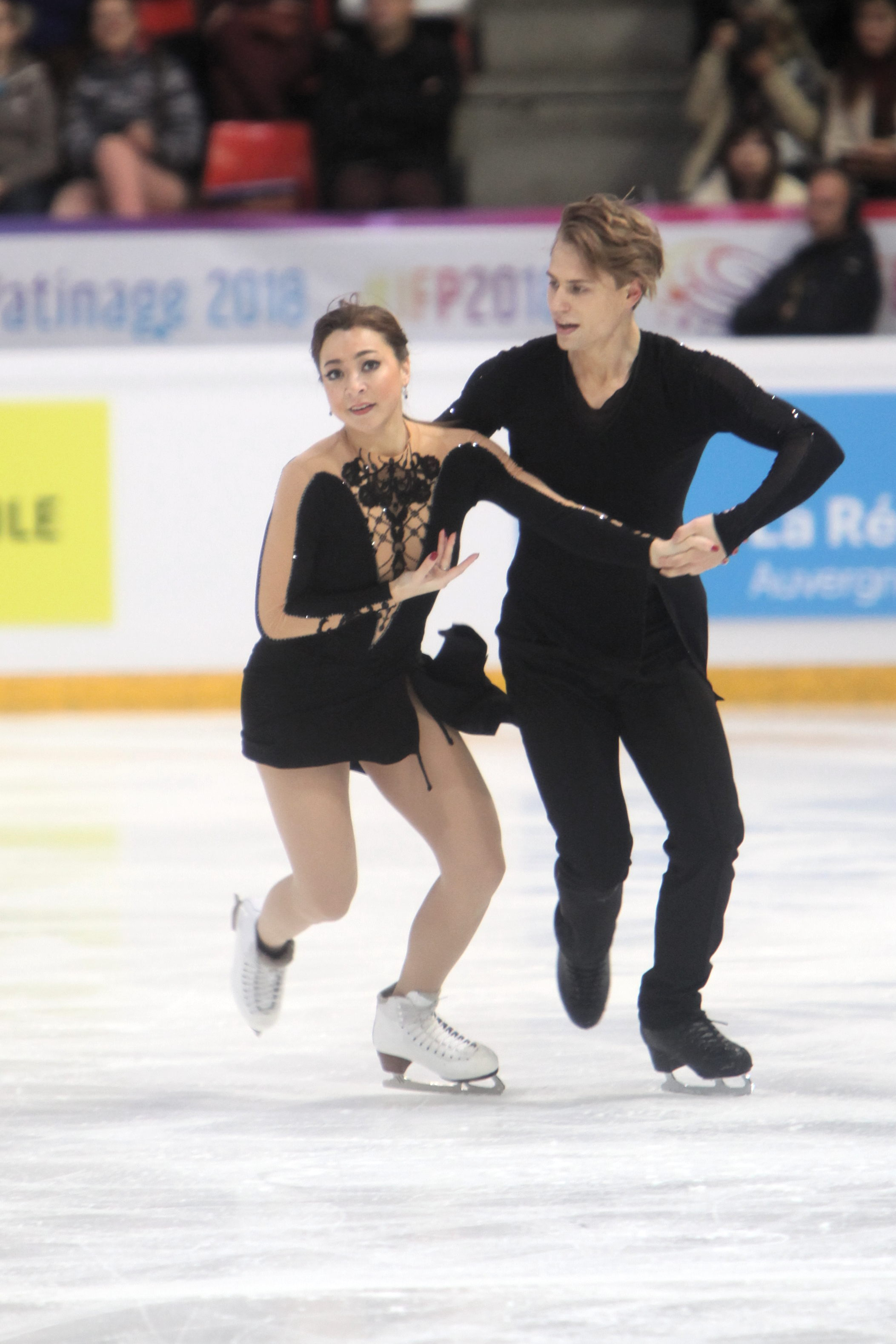
Reed/Ambrulevicius at the 2018 Internationaux de France

Reed/Ambrulevičius began their season at the 2018 Halloween Cup, where they won the silver medal, before going on to finish fifth at the 2018 Volvo Open Cup.

Debuting on the Grand Prix series, Reed/Ambrulevičius placed sixth at the 2018 Rostelecom Cup and ninth at the 2018 Internationaux de France. They then went on to win their second consecutive national title at the 2018–19 Lithuanian Championships.

Selected to compete at the 2019 European Championships in Minsk, Belarus, Reed/Ambrulevičius finished thirteenth, before going on to finish seventeenth at the 2019 World Championships in Saitama, Japan.

==== 2019–20 season ====
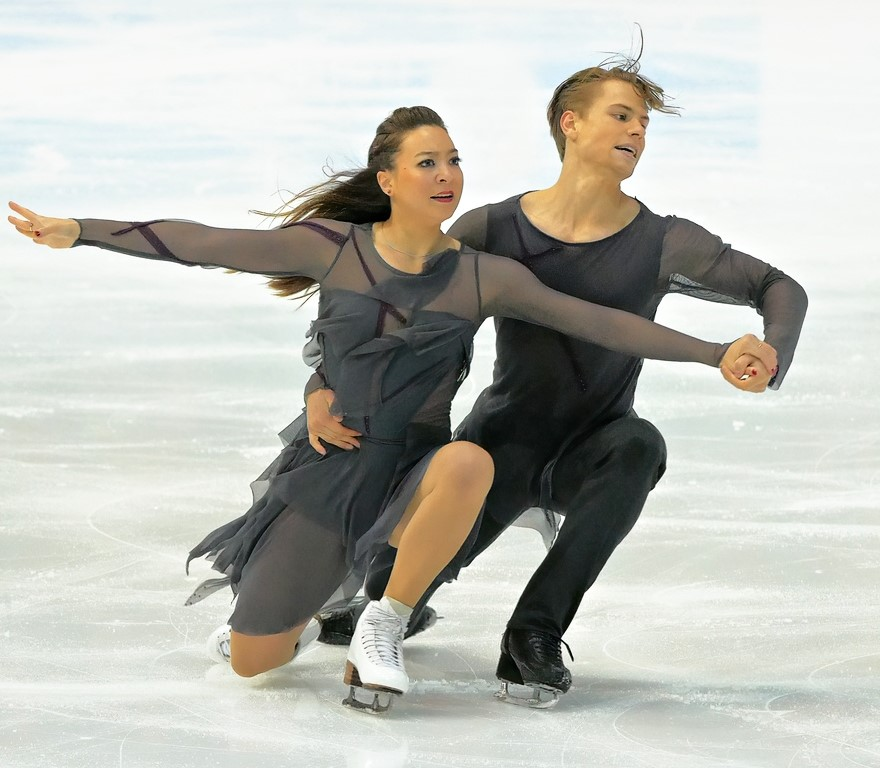
Reed/Ambrulevičius at the 2019 Internationaux de France

Reed/Ambrulevičius opened their season at the 2019 CS Lombardia Trophy, finishing sixth. They then went on to place seventh at the 2019 CS Nebelhorn Trophy and fifth at the 2019 CS Finlandia Trophy. Competing on the 2019–20 Grand Prix series, Reed/Ambrulevičius placed tenth at the 2019 Internationaux de France and fifth at the 2019 Rostelecom Cup.

After winning their third national title at the 2019–20 Lithuanian Championships, Reed/Ambrulevičius went on to finish eleventh at the 2020 European Championships in Graz, Austria and win the gold medal at the 2020 Bavarian Open.

Although selected to compete at the 2020 World Championships, the event was ultimately cancelled due to the onset of the COVID-19 pandemic.

==== 2020–21 season ====
Reed/Ambrulevičius switched coaches from Marina Zueva to Maurizio Margaglio prior to the season. They began the season with a seventh-place finish at the 2020 Rostelecom Cup, before going on to win their fourth national title at the 2020–21 Lithuanian Championships.

At the 2021 World Championships in Stockholm, Sweden, Reed/Ambrulevičius placed fifteenth.

==== 2021–22 season ====
Prior to the season, Reed/Ambrulevičius relocated to Montreal, Quebec to train under Marie-France Dubreuil, Patrice Lauzon, and Romain Haguenauer. Despite Reed/Ambrulevičius qualifying a spot for a Lithuanian dance team at the 2022 Winter Olympics with their place at the 2021 World Championships, it was announced in October 2021 that Reed's application for Lithuanian citizenship was denied, thus ending their bid for the Winter Olympics.

Reed/Ambrulevičius nonetheless began their season at the 2021 Budapest Trophy, where they took the silver medal. On the Grand Prix series, Reed/Ambrulevičius placed eighth at the 2021 Internationaux de France and seventh at the 2021 Rostelecom Cup. They then won the silver medal at the 2021 CS Golden Spin of Zagreb as well as their fifth national title at the 2021–22 Lithuanian Championships.

At the 2022 European Championships in Tallinn, Estonia, Reed/Ambrulevičius finished eighth, before going on to finish tenth at the 2022 World Championships in Montpellier, France.

==== 2022–23 season ====
Reed/Ambrulevičius opened their season by winning silver at both the 2022 CS Lombardia Trophy and the 2022 CS Nebelhorn Trophy. Although they withdrew from the 2022 Skate America, they did compete at the 2022 NHK Trophy, where they finished fourth. At the event, Reed saw her sister Cathy in-person for the first time in over two years, having been separated due to the pandemic.

Reed/Ambrulevičius went on to win the silver medal at the 2022 CS Golden Spin of Zagreb, before competing at the 2023 European Championships in Espoo, Finland, where they achieved a career-best fourth-place finish. They were only 2.54 points out of third place. They ended their season at the 2023 World Championships in Saitama, Japan, where they finished seventh.

==== 2023–24 season: Grand Prix bronzes and Europeans bronze ====
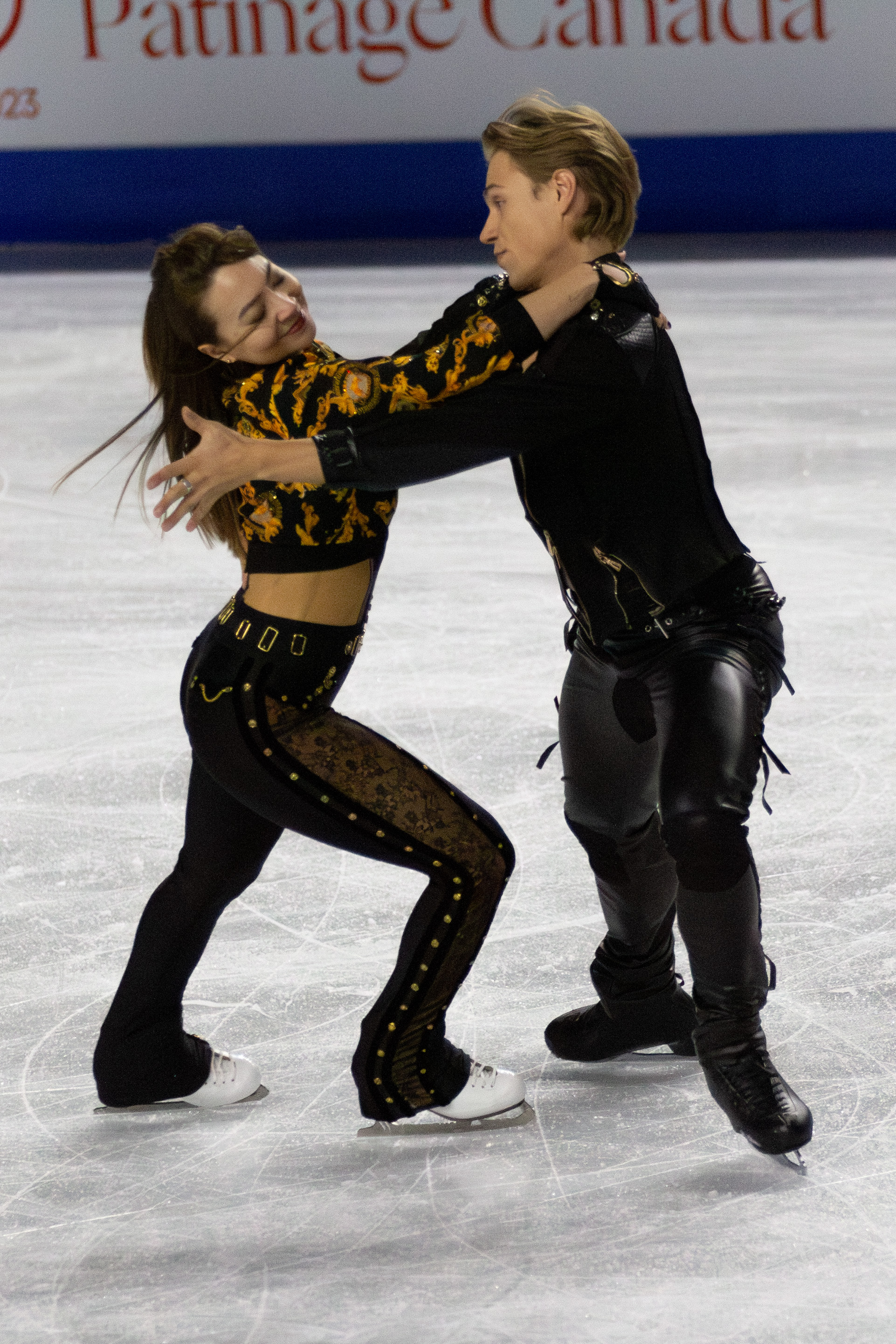
Reed/Ambrulevicius at the 2023 Skate Canada International

Beginning the season at the 2023 CS Nebelhorn Trophy, Reed/Ambrulevičius won the silver medal at the event for the second consecutive season. Given two assignments on the Grand Prix, they began at the 2023 Skate Canada International, this time held in Vancouver. They finished third in both segments, winning the bronze medal, their first on the circuit. It was the first Grand Prix medal for Lithuania since Drobiazko/Vanagas's silver at the 2001 NHK Trophy. Reed said afterward that "there was some opposition, opportunities missed, and some dreams we were not able to achieve, but this is a dream we achieved." They won another bronze medal at their second event, the 2023 NHK Trophy. She called it "extra special" to win a medal in Japan, and with her sister Cathy in attendance while coaching one of her own teams. Reed/Ambrulevičius were named as first alternates to the Grand Prix Final.

Reed/Ambrulevičius concluded the first half of the season at the 2023 CS Golden Spin of Zagreb, where they won the gold medal, their first Challenger title. Reed hailed it as a "truly wonderful way to end the year."

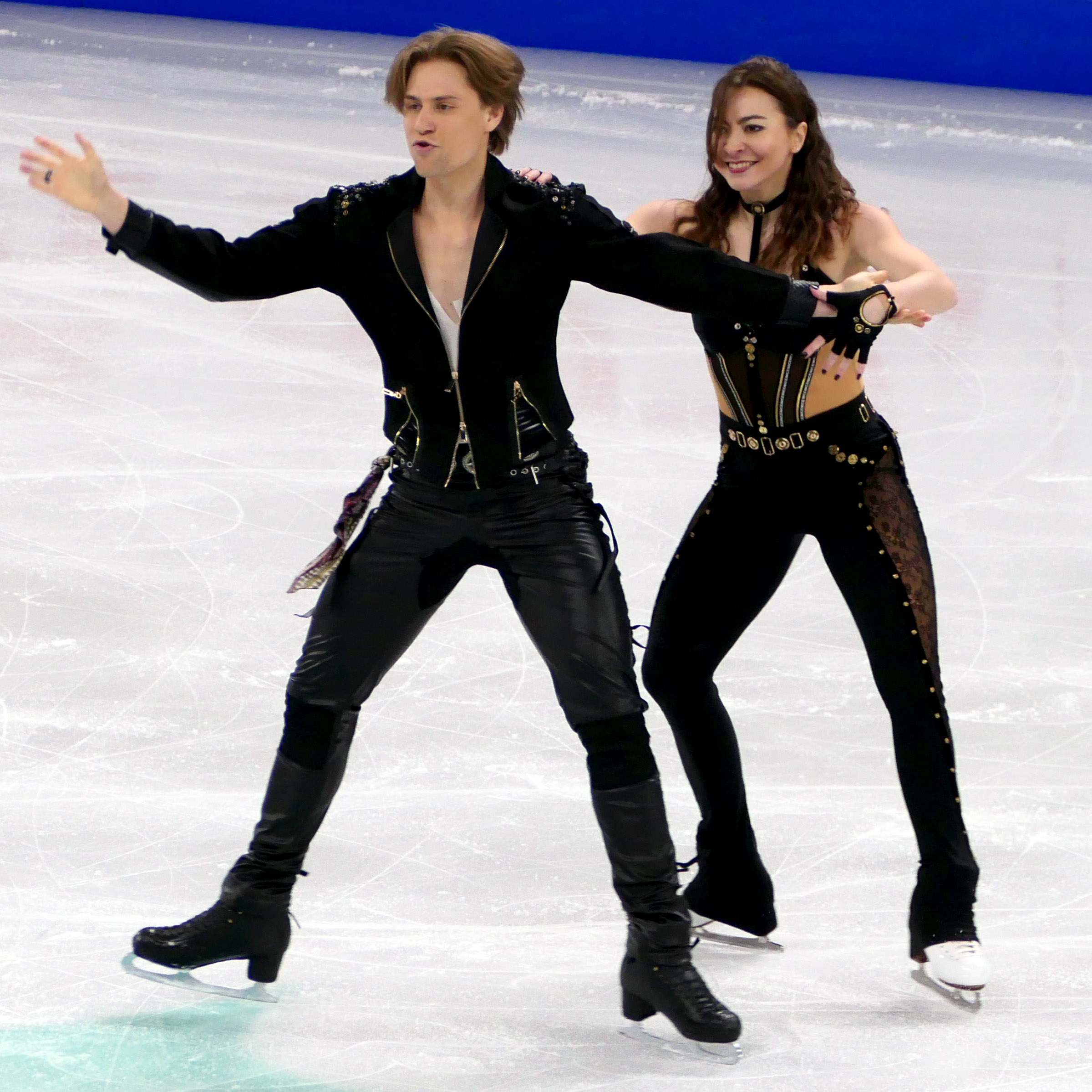
Reed/Ambrulevicius at the 2024 World Championships

With the 2024 European Championships being hosted on home ice in Kaunas, Reed/Ambrulevičius entered the event as the medal hopes of the nation. They finished third in the rhythm dance, before setting new personal bests in the free dance and total score to come third there as well, taking the bronze medal, their first time on an ISU championship podium. The free dance occurred on Lithuania's Day of the Defenders of Freedom, which Ambrulevičius noted as significant, saying "we fought for our freedom and today we fought for our country again and we did it." The duo's success brought renewed attention to the issue of Reed's Lithuanian citizenship application. On February 9, Reed announced that she would renew her bid for citizenship.

The 2024 World Championships were held in Montreal, Quebec, Canada, the location of the team's training base. Reed/Ambrulevičius finished a career-best sixth overall, an end to what Reed called an "incredible, incredible season". In an April interview, the team reflected on their season and talked about their goals for 2024–25.

==== 2024–25 season ====
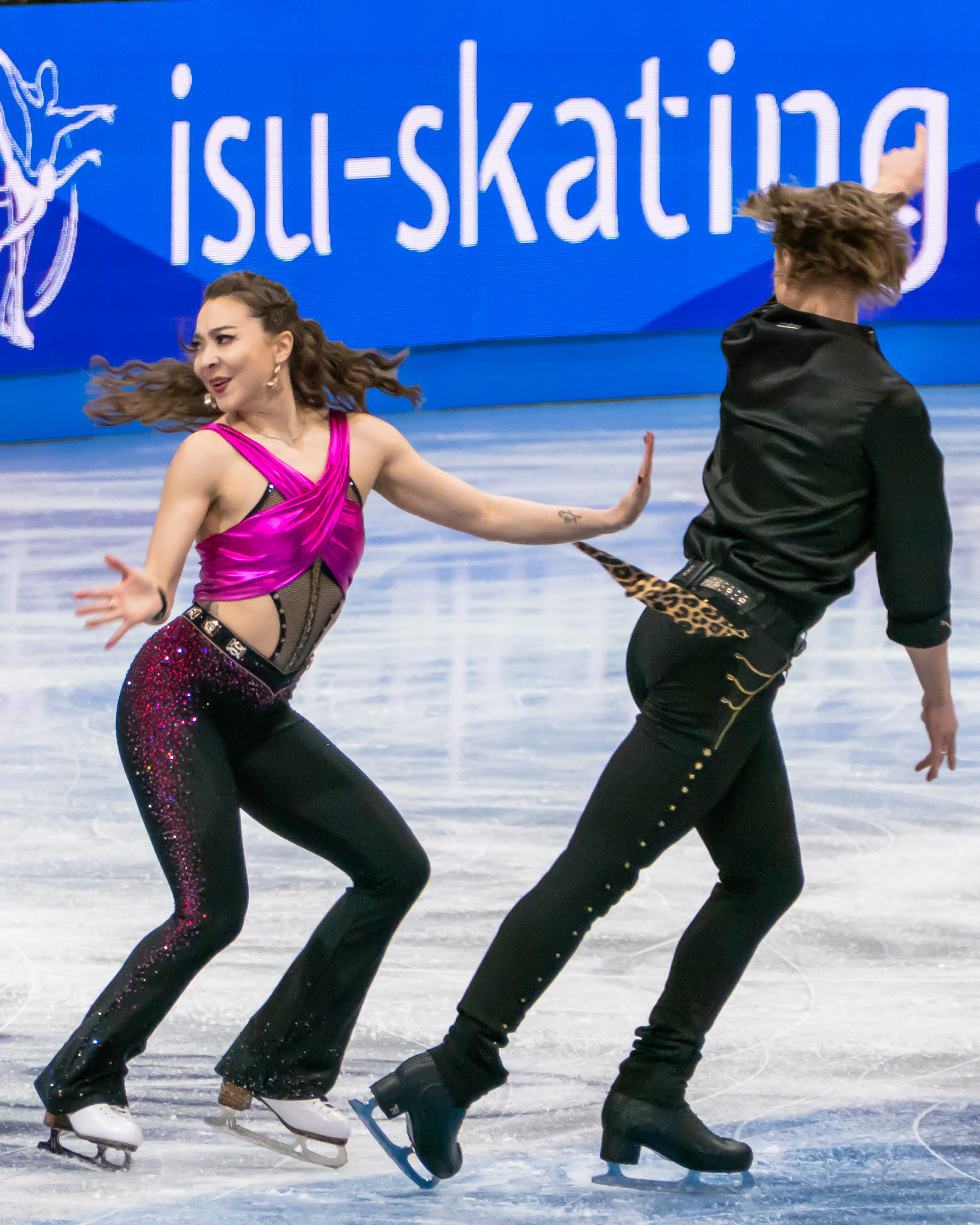
Reed/Ambrulevicius during their rhythm dance at the 2025 World Championships

During summer preparations, Reed's skate blade injured Ambrulevičius' hand twice, as a result delaying their start by a month. They discarded their initial plan to compete at the 2024 CS Nebelhorn Trophy. Reed/Ambrulevičius instead began their season on the Challenger series at the 2024 CS Trophée Métropole Nice Côte d'Azur, where they won the gold medal. Going on to compete on the 2024–25 Grand Prix circuit, Reed/Ambrulevičius finished fourth at the 2024 Grand Prix de France, having struggled with level issues. The following week they competed at their second event, the 2024 NHK Trophy, where they won the bronze medal, despite lost twizzle levels in the free dance. Reed said afterward regarding their goals for the season and Olympic qualification, "we're just really looking forward to performing at Worlds and hopefully getting that spot from Lithuania. Hopefully we'll be the ones to go this time."

Following the Grand Prix, the issue of Reed's bid for Lithuanian citizenship came to a head, following an October recommendation by Lithuania's citizenship committee that she be granted citizenship, with her sporting achievements cited as "special merits to the country." On November 18, Reed met with President Gitanas Nausėda at the Presidential Palace in Vilnius, and told reporters afterward that it had "been a long journey to this moment, but now I'm very happy. I think it went very well." On November 21, Nausėda decreed that her request be granted. Reed took the oath of allegiance in a ceremony at the Lithuanian embassy to Canada in Ottawa on December 17.

At the 2025 European Championships in Tallinn, Estonia, Reed and Ambrulevičius finished in sixth place. At the 2025 World Championships in Boston, Massachusetts, United States, they skated in the penultimate group of the rhythm dance, and performed shortly after the Finnish team of Juulia Turkkila and Matthias Versluis had unexpectedly fallen and appeared poised to miss qualification for the free dance by one ordinal. However, Reed also fell in the segment, and as a result, Reed and Ambrulevičius finished twenty-first, missing the free dance. The Finns, who thereby reached the free dance, said afterward that they had "shared their grief," adding: "We're all good friends, and we really felt for them."

==== 2025–26 season: Milano Cortina Olympics, Worlds and Europeans ====
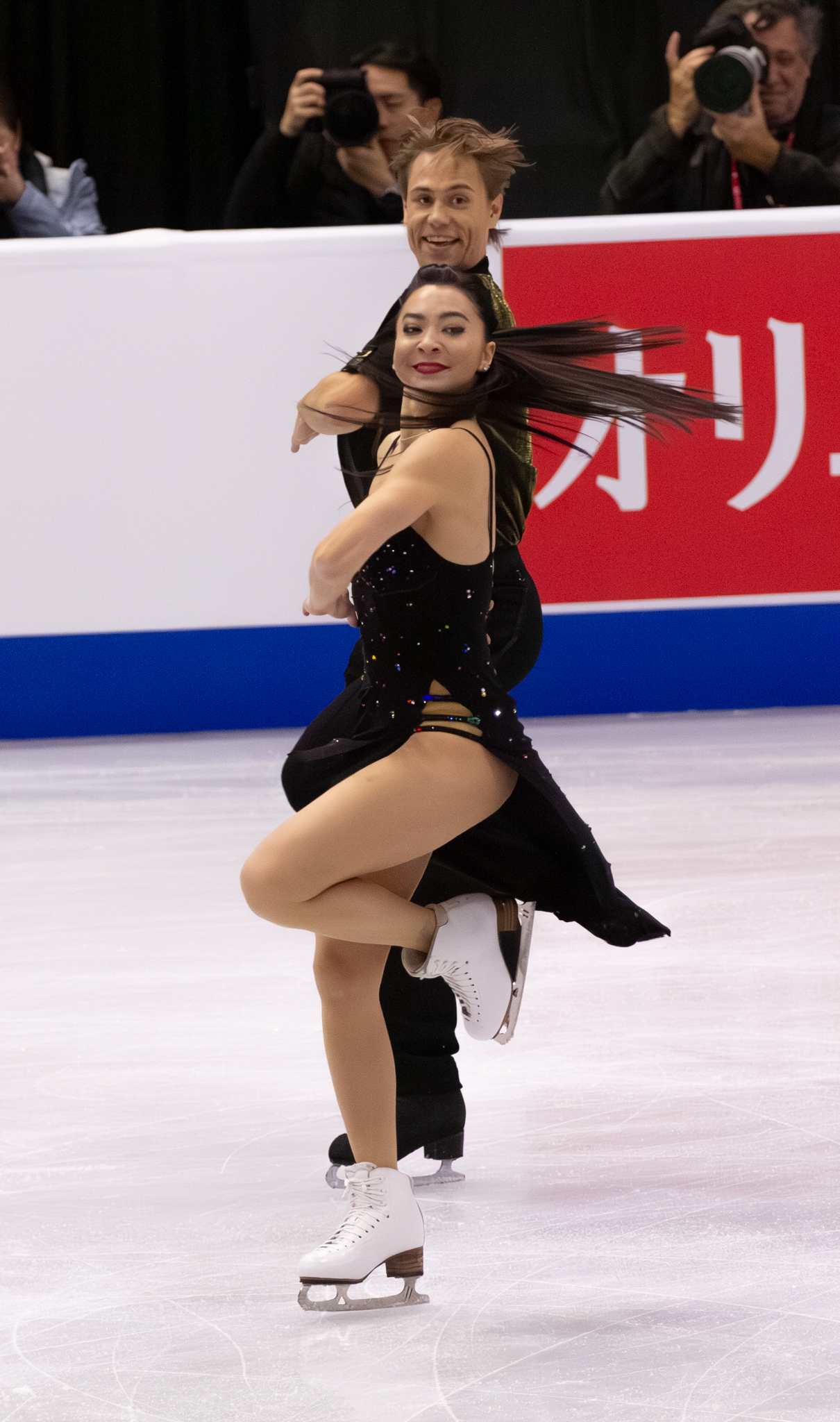
Reed/Ambrulevicius performing twizzles during their rhythm dance at 2025 Skate Canada International

Reed/Ambrulevičius opened their season by winning Skate to Milano by a significant margin, earning a spot at the 2026 Winter Olympics. "It means everything to me, especially to share this experience with my best friend," said Reed. "My first Olympics were 15 years ago, and I was only 15 at the time."

The team later placed second at 2025 Bolero Cup before competing at 2025 Grand Prix de France where they took the bronze. "Medaling at the Grand Prix event is always a pleasure and gives us big pride and honor," said Ambrulevicius.

Reed/Ambrulevičius went on to finished second at 2025 Skate Canada International. They place second in the Rhythm dance and first in the Free dance (ice dance). “We skated today the way that we trained to do it,” said Ambrulevicius after the Free dance. “Our training paid off and we’re happy with our performance. It was a big, big, big win for us."

Reed/Ambrulevičius placed fifth at the 2025–26 Grand Prix Final.

In January, Reed/Ambrulevičius placed fifth at the 2026 European Championships. "Even though today was a struggle, I can’t seem to wipe the smile off my face because I know where we’re going," said Reed after the free dance. "I know where we’re headed, and I know that we need to put in the work and we will be ready. I have zero doubt."

In early February, it was announced that Reed and Ambrulevičius had been selected as flag bearers for Lithuania for the 2026 Winter Olympic opening ceremony.

On February 9, Reed/Ambrulevičius competed in the rhythm dance segment at the 2026 Winter Olympics, placing seventh. "It was fantastic. The energy out there was electric," said Ambrulevičius after their performance. "Skating in front of this kind of crowd, you always feel like you want to give your one and all." Two days later, the team placed seventh in the free dance to finish in sixth place overall. "The emotions are just so spectacular!” said Reed after the free dance. “We are really, really proud of ourselves. Proud to have stepped out on this ice and danced our hearts out. It was phenomenal!"

The following month, Reed/Ambrulevičius placed seventh at the 2026 World Figure Skating Championships marking their eight appearance at the event. Following the Rhythm Dance, Ambrulevičius commented on the length of the season and the physical demands of competing from August through late March.

== Programs ==
=== Ice dance with Saulius Ambrulevičius (for Lithuania) ===
| Season | Short dance | Free dance | Exhibition |
|---|---|---|---|
| 2025–2026 | Would You...? by Touch and Go; Cantaloop (Flip Fantasia) by Us3 & Gerard Presencer; I'm Too Sexy (Bettys Mix) by Right Said Fred choreo. by Marie France Dubreuil, Samuel Chouinard | God Is a DJ (Remix) by Faithless & Jason Howes; We Come 1 by Faithless choreo. by Marie France Dubreuil, Samuel Chouinard | Welcome to the Jungle; Paradise City; Welcome to the Jungle by Guns N' Roses choreo. by Marie France Dubreuil, Samuel Chouinard |
| 2024–2025 | Da Ya Think I'm Sexy? by Rod Stewart; Da Ya Think I'm Sexy? (Blow-up Remix) performed by Claudio Camaione, Paolo Cilione, & Rod Stewart; Da Ya Think I'm Sexy? (Extended Version) by N-Trance & Rod Stewart choreo. by Marie France Dubreuil, Samuel Chouinard | Lord & Master by Apashe; Never Change (Acoustic) by Apashe & YMIR; Kryptonite by Apashe & Lia Kuri choreo. by Marie France Dubreuil, Samuel Chouinard | Only by RY X |
| 2023–2024 | Welcome to the Jungle; Paradise City; Welcome to the Jungle by Guns N' Roses choreo. by Marie France Dubreuil, Samuel Chouinard | Enough of our Machines by Son Lux; Children by Tokio Myers choreo. by Marie France Dubreuil, Samuel Chouinard | Insomnia by Faithless choreo. by Marie France Dubreuil, Samuel Chouinard, Massimo Scali |
| 2022–2023 | Mambo: How How; Rhumba: Starlight Scene; Samba: On the Run by Yello choreo. by Marie France Dubreuil, Samuel Chouinard, Massimo Scali | Insomnia by Faithless choreo. by Marie France Dubreuil, Samuel Chouinard, Massimo Scali | Švelnumas by Gabrielė Vilkickytė |
| 2021–2022 | Old Friend by Elderbrook; Blues: Hazey by Glass Animals; Blue Monday (Vandalism Remix) by Kurd Maverick choreo. by Massimo Scali, Margarita Drobiazko, Povilas Vanagas | Vinegar & Salt by Hooverphonic; White Lies by Karl Hugo; Lacrimosa choreo. by Massimo Scali, Margarita Drobiazko, Povilas Vanagas | On Fire by The Roop |
| 2020–2021 | Blues: Love Will Come and Find Me Again; Quickstep: You Deserve It (from Bandstand) by Richard Oberacker, Robert Taylor choreo. by Massimo Scali | Churchyard; It Happened Quiet; Soft Universe by Aurora choreo. by Massimo Scali | |
| 2019–2020 | Blues: Love Will Come and Find Me Again; Quickstep: You Deserve It (from Bandstand) by Richard Oberacker, Robert Taylor choreo. by Massimo Scali | Churchyard; It Happened Quiet; Soft Universe by Aurora choreo. by Massimo Scali | |
| 2018–2019 | Tango: Ojos Negros; Tango: Idilio; Tango: Zita choreo. by Massimo Scali, Marina Zueva | Crazy by Gnarls Barkley (Space Jazz Cover feat. Hannah Gill and Casey Abrams) choreo. by Massimo Scali, Marina Zueva | |
| 2017–2018 | Samba: Light It Up (Samba remix); Rhumba: Addicted to You (Rhumba remix); Samba: Destination Calibria by Alex Gaudino choreo. by Massimo Scali, Marina Zueva | Stairway to Heaven by Led Zeppelin choreo. by Massimo Scali, Marina Zueva | |

=== Ice dance with Vasili Rogov (for Israel) ===
| Season | Short dance | Free dance |
|---|---|---|
| 2014–2015 | Flamenco; Paso doble | Romeo + Juliet by Nellee Hooper, Craig Armstrong, Marius de Vries |
| 2013–2014 | Foxtrot: Hit the Road Jack; Quickstep: Rhythm | Pirates of the Caribbean; Up Is Down by Hans Zimmer; He's A Pirate by Klaus Badelt; Two Hornpipes (Tortuga) by Hans Zimmer; Moonlight Serenade by Klaus Badelt |
| 2012–2013 | Waltz: Claudia's Waltz; Polka: A Rambler's Life by The Dreadnoughts | Bacchanale (from Samson and Delilah) by Camille Saint-Saëns |

=== With Otar Japaridze (for Georgia) ===
| Season | Short dance | Free dance |
|---|---|---|
| 2010–2011 | Desde el Alma by Juan d'Arienzo; Building the Bullet by Luis Bacalov | The Messiah Will Come Again; Oh Pretty Woman by Gary Moore |
| | Original dance | |
| 2009–2010 | Georgian folk dance: Bukinagari; Iloumi | Crusaders of the Light; Preliator by Yoav Goren |

== Competitive highlights ==
- GP – Event of the ISU Grand Prix Series
- JGP – Event of the ISU Junior Grand Prix Series
- CS – Event of the ISU Challenger Series
- TBD – Assigned
- WD – Withdrew from competition
- C – Event was cancelled

=== Ice dance with Saulius Ambrulevičius (for Lithuania) ===
Competition placements at senior level
| Season | 2017–18 | 2018–19 | 2019–20 | 2020–21 | 2021–22 | 2022–23 | 2023–24 | 2024–25 | 2025–26 | 2026–27 |
|---|---|---|---|---|---|---|---|---|---|---|
| Winter Olympics | | | | | | | | | 6th | |
| World Championships | 20th | 17th | C | 15th | 10th | 7th | 6th | 21st | 7th | |
| European Championships | | 13th | 11th | | 8th | 4th | 3rd | 6th | 5th | |
| Grand Prix Final | | | | | | | | | 5th | |
| Lithuanian Championships | 1st | 1st | 1st | 1st | 1st | | | | | |
| GP Finland | | | | | | | | | | TBD |
| GP France | | 9th | 10th | | 8th | | | 4th | 3rd | TBD |
| GP NHK Trophy | | | | | | 4th | 3rd | 3rd | | |
| GP Rostelecom Cup | | 6th | 5th | 7th | 7th | | | | | |
| GP Skate Canada | | | | | | | 3rd | | 2nd | |
| CS Finlandia Trophy | | | 5th | | | | | | | |
| CS Golden Spin of Zagreb | | | | | 2nd | 2nd | 1st | | | |
| CS Lombardia Trophy | | | 6th | | | 2nd | | | | |
| CS Nebelhorn Trophy | 7th | | 7th | | | 2nd | 2nd | | | |
| CS Ondrej Nepela Trophy | 6th | | | | | | | | | |
| CS Tallinn Trophy | 8th | | | | | | | | | |
| CS Trophée Métropole Nice | | | | | | | | 1st | | |
| Bavarian Open | | | 1st | | | | | | | |
| Bolero Cup | | | | | | | | | 2nd | |
| Budapest Trophy | | | | | 2nd | | | | | |
| Egna Dance Trophy | | | | | | | | 1st | | |
| Halloween Cup | | 2nd | | | | | | | | |
| Santa Claus Cup | 5th | | | | | | | | | |
| Skate to Milano | | | | | | | | | 1st | |
| Volvo Open Cup | | 5th | | | | | | | | |

=== Ice dance with Vasili Rogov (for Israel) ===
Competition placements at senior level
| Season | 2012–13 | 2013–14 | 2014–15 |
|---|---|---|---|
| World Championships | 23rd | 30th | 20th |
| European Championships | | 24th | 16th |
| CS Finlandia Trophy | | | 5th |
| CS Nebelhorn Trophy | 13th | 18th | 6th |
| CS Volvo Open Cup | | | 6th |
| Bavarian Open | | | 2nd |
| Golden Spin of Zagreb | 7th | 7th | |
| NRW Trophy | 6th | 4th | |
| Pavel Roman Memorial | 10th | | |
| Tallinn Trophy | | | 1st |
| Ukrainian Open | | 6th | |
| U.S. Classic | | 10th | |

=== Ice dance with Otar Japaridze (for Georgia) ===
Competition placements at senior level
| Season | 2009–10 | 2010–11 |
|---|---|---|
| Winter Olympics | 22nd | |
| World Championships | 21st | 18th |
| European Championships | 19th | 17th |
| Golden Spin of Zagreb | | 4th |
| Ice Challenge | | 2nd |
| Nebelhorn Trophy | 12th | |
| Pavel Roman Memorial | 9th | |

== Detailed results ==
=== Ice dance with Saulius Ambrulevičius (for Lithuania) ===
ISU personal best scores in the +5/-5 GOE System
| Segment | Type | Score | Event |
|---|---|---|---|
| Total | TSS | 204.66 | 2026 Winter Olympics |
| Short program | TSS | 83.08 | 2026 European Championships |
| Short program | TES | 47.86 | 2026 Winter Olympics |
| Short program | PCS | 35.35 | 2026 European Championships |
| Free skating | TSS | 122.64 | 2024 European Championships |
| Free skating | TES | 68.93 | 2026 Winter Olympics |
| Free skating | PCS | 53.86 | 2024 European Championships |

Results in the 2025–26 season
| Date | Event | RD | | FD | | Total | |
| Date | Event | P | Score | P | Score | P | Score |
|---|---|---|---|---|---|---|---|
| Sep 5–6, 2025 | (United Kingdom) 2025 Bolero Cup | 2 | 76.31 | 1 | 121.19 | 2 | 197.50 |
| Sep 18–21, 2025 | (China) 2025 ISU Skate to Milano | 1 | 80.95 | 1 | 117.78 | 1 | 198.73 |
| Oct 17–19, 2025 | 2025 Grand Prix de France | 2 | 80.98 | 3 | 120.07 | 3 | 201.05 |
| Oct 31 – Nov 2, 2025 | 2025 Skate Canada International | 2 | 80.89 | 1 | 120.03 | 2 | 200.92 |
| Dec 4–7, 2025 | (Japan) 2025–26 Grand Prix Final | 5 | 79.48 | 5 | 120.13 | 5 | 199.61 |
| Jan 13–18, 2026 | (United Kingdom) 2026 European Championships | 4 | 83.08 | 7 | 117.21 | 5 | 200.29 |
| Feb 9–11, 2026 | (Italy) 2026 Winter Olympics | 7 | 82.95 | 7 | 121.71 | 6 | 204.66 |
| Mar 24–29, 2026 | (Czech Republic) 2026 World Championships | 9 | 79.66 | 6 | 121.00 | 7 | 200.66 |

2024–2025 season
| Date | Event | RD | FD | Total |
|---|---|---|---|---|
| March 24–30, 2025 | 2025 World Championships | 21; 68.08 | – | 21; 68.08 |
| February 7–9, 2025 | 2025 Egna Dance Trophy | 1; 80.62 | 1; 114.02 | 1; 194.64 |
| January 28 – February 2, 2025 | 2025 European Championships | 5; 78.67 | 7; 117.99 | 6; 196.66 |
| November 8–10, 2024 | 2024 NHK Trophy | 3; 77.91 | 3; 117.61 | 3; 195.52 |
| November 1–3, 2024 | 2024 Grand Prix de France | 3; 74.49 | 4; 110.75 | 4; 185.24 |
| October 16–20, 2024 | 2024 CS Trophée Métropole Nice Côte d'Azur | 1; 77.96 | 2; 111.97 | 1; 189.93 |
2023–2024 season
| Date | Event | RD | FD | Total |
| March 18–24, 2024 | 2024 World Championships | 6; 80.99 | 9; 119.97 | 6; 200.96 |
| January 8–14, 2024 | 2024 European Championships | 3; 80.73 | 3; 122.64 | 3; 203.37 |
| December 6–9, 2023 | 2023 CS Golden Spin of Zagreb | 1; 81.19 | 1; 118.92 | 1; 200.11 |
| November 24–26, 2023 | 2023 NHK Trophy | 3; 78.71 | 3; 118.15 | 3; 196.86 |
| October 27–29, 2023 | 2023 Skate Canada International | 3; 75.60 | 3; 116.41 | 3; 192.01 |
| September 20–23, 2023 | 2023 CS Nebelhorn Trophy | 2; 73.62 | 2; 116.93 | 2; 190.55 |
2022–23 season
| Date | Event | RD | FD | Total |
| March 22–26, 2023 | 2023 World Championships | 7; 78.70 | 7; 120.50 | 7; 199.20 |
| January 25–29, 2023 | 2023 European Championships | 4; 77.33 | 4; 118.34 | 4; 195.67 |
| December 7–10, 2022 | 2022 CS Golden Spin of Zagreb | 1; 77.21 | 2; 112.26 | 2; 189.47 |
| November 18–20, 2022 | 2022 NHK Trophy | 4; 75.23 | 3; 114.75 | 4; 189.98 |
| September 21–24, 2022 | 2022 CS Nebelhorn Trophy | 2; 78.98 | 2; 106.43 | 2; 185.41 |
| September 16–19, 2022 | 2022 CS Lombardia Trophy | 3; 71.95 | 2; 111.65 | 2; 183.60 |
2021–22 season
| Date | Event | RD | FD | Total |
| March 21–27, 2022 | 2022 World Championships | 10; 74.06 | 11; 106.15 | 10; 180.21 |
| January 10–16, 2022 | 2022 European Championships | 7; 74.45 | 8; 108.72 | 8; 183.17 |
| December 7–11, 2021 | 2021 CS Golden Spin of Zagreb | 1; 75.81 | 4; 104.34 | 2; 180.15 |
| November 26–28, 2021 | 2021 Rostelecom Cup | 7; 71.43 | 8; 106.45 | 7; 177.88 |
| November 19–21, 2021 | 2021 Internationaux de France | 8; 64.43 | 6; 105.40 | 8; 169.83 |
| October 14–17, 2021 | 2021 Budapest Trophy | 1; 72.05 | 2; 108.96 | 2; 181.01 |
2020–21 season
| Date | Event | RD | FD | Total |
| March 22–28, 2021 | 2021 World Championships | 15; 71.29 | 15; 106.89 | 15; 178.18 |
| November 20–22, 2020 | 2020 Rostelecom Cup | 7; 72.43 | 7; 110.13 | 7; 182.56 |
2019–20 season
| Date | Event | RD | FD | |
| February 3–9, 2020 | 2020 Bavarian Open | 1; 68.79 | 1; 108.99 | 1; 177.78 |
| January 20–26, 2020 | 2020 European Championships | 8; 73.22 | 13; 101.02 | 11; 174.24 |
| November 15–17, 2019 | 2019 Rostelecom Cup | 5; 69.79 | 6; 105.64 | 5; 175.43 |
| November 1–3, 2019 | 2019 Internationaux de France | 10; 60.99 | 9; 100.74 | 10; 161.73 |
| October 11–13, 2019 | 2019 CS Finlandia Trophy | 5; 70.61 | 6; 97.72 | 5; 168.33 |
| September 25–28, 2019 | 2019 CS Nebelhorn Trophy | 7; 73.41 | 7; 106.72 | 7; 180.13 |
| September 13–15, 2019 | 2019 CS Lombardia Trophy | 3; 69.22 | 6; 98.26 | 6; 167.48 |
2018–19 season
| Date | Event | RD | FD | Total |
| March 18–24, 2019 | 2019 World Championships | 16; 67.21 | 17; 100.85 | 17; 168.06 |
| January 21–27. 2019 | 2019 European Championships | 12; 64.81 | 14; 99.30 | 13; 164.11 |
| November 23–25, 2018 | 2018 Internationaux de France | 9; 59.77 | 9; 93.50 | 9; 153.27 |
| November 16–18, 2018 | 2018 Rostelecom Cup | 5; 64.54 | 6; 93.49 | 6; 158.03 |
| November 6–11, 2018 | 2018 Volvo Open Cup | 4; 59.96 | 6; 93.82 | 5; 153.78 |
| October 19–21, 2018 | 2018 Halloween Cup | 2; 61.80 | 3; 94.31 | 2; 156.11 |
2017–18 season
| Date | Event | SD | FD | Total |
| March 19–25, 2018 | 2018 World Championships | 18; 61.33 | 20; 86.97 | 20; 148.30 |
| December 4–10, 2017 | 2017 Santa Claus Cup | 4; 60.82 | 6; 86.00 | 5; 146.82 |
| November 21–26, 2017 | 2017 CS Tallinn Trophy | 7; 55.02 | 9; 81.66 | 8; 136.68 |
| September 27–30, 2017 | 2017 CS Nebelhorn Trophy | 4; 58.34 | 8; 84.61 | 7; 142.95 |
| September 21–23, 2017 | 2017 CS Ondrej Nepela Trophy | 8; 51.74 | 4; 86.66 | 6; 138.40 |

Olympic Games
| Preceded by Deividas Kizala and Paulina Ramanauskaitė | Flagbearer for Lithuania (with Saulius Ambrulevičius); Milano Cortina 2026 | Succeeded by |
