= Mutant (disambiguation) =

A mutant is a biological entity which has undergone a change in its genetic structure.

Mutant or mutants may also refer to:

== Arts, entertainment and media ==
- Mutants in fiction, a common trope in science fiction and comic books

=== Fictional chracters ===
- Mutant (Marvel Comics), a human being who is born with genetic modifications that allow for abilities not possessed by regular humans

=== Film ===
- Mutant, a 1982 science fiction/horror film better known as Forbidden World
- Mutant (1984 film), a horror film
- Mutant (2025 film), a Chilean documentary film
- Mutants (2008 film), American film with Michael Ironside
- Mutants (2009 film), French film
- Mutant (2025 film), a Chilean documentary film
- The Mutants (film), a 1998 Portuguese film

=== Games ===
- Mutant (role-playing game), a series of Swedish role-playing games developed and published by Target Games
  - Mutant (role-playing game 1984) or "Old Mutant", the original release
- Mutants: Genetic Gladiators, a 2014 Kobojo game

=== Literature ===
- Mutant (short story collection), a collection of science fiction short stories by Lewis Padgett
- Mutants (short story collection), a collection of short stories by Gordon R. Dickson
- "The Mutants", by Rog Phillips 1946
- The Mutants, by Kris Neville 1966
- The Mutants, by Berni Wrightson 1980
- Mutants: On Genetic Variety and the Human Body, a book by Armand Marie Leroi

=== Music ===
- The Mutants (San Francisco band), a punk rock band
- The Mutants (UK band), a punk rock musical collaboration with an all-star cast of guest musicians
- Mutant (album), a 2015 album by Arca
- Mutant (Vol. 2), a follow-up album to the Man's Myth Vol. 1 album (collectively known as Man's Myth & Mutant) by horror-core band Twiztid
- Mutants (John Dahlbäck album), 2010
- Mutants (Mutoid Man album), 2023
- Mutant, a 2015 album by Moka Only

=== Television ===
- "The Mutant", a 1964 episode of The Outer Limits
- The Mutants, another title used for the 1963 Doctor Who serial The Daleks, not to be confused with the 1972 serial below
- The Mutants, a 1972 Doctor Who serial
- "Mutants" (The Mighty Boosh), a 2004 episode

== Weapons ==
- CMMG Mk47 Mutant, an American-made semi-automatic rifle

== See also ==
- Os Mutantes, a Brazilian psychedelic rock band
  - Os Mutantes (album), the band's eponymous 1968 debut album
  - Mutantes (album), a 1969 album by Os Mutantes
- Mutation (disambiguation)
