= Saulius Ambrulevičius =

Lithuanian figure skater (born 1992)

Saulius Ambrulevičus
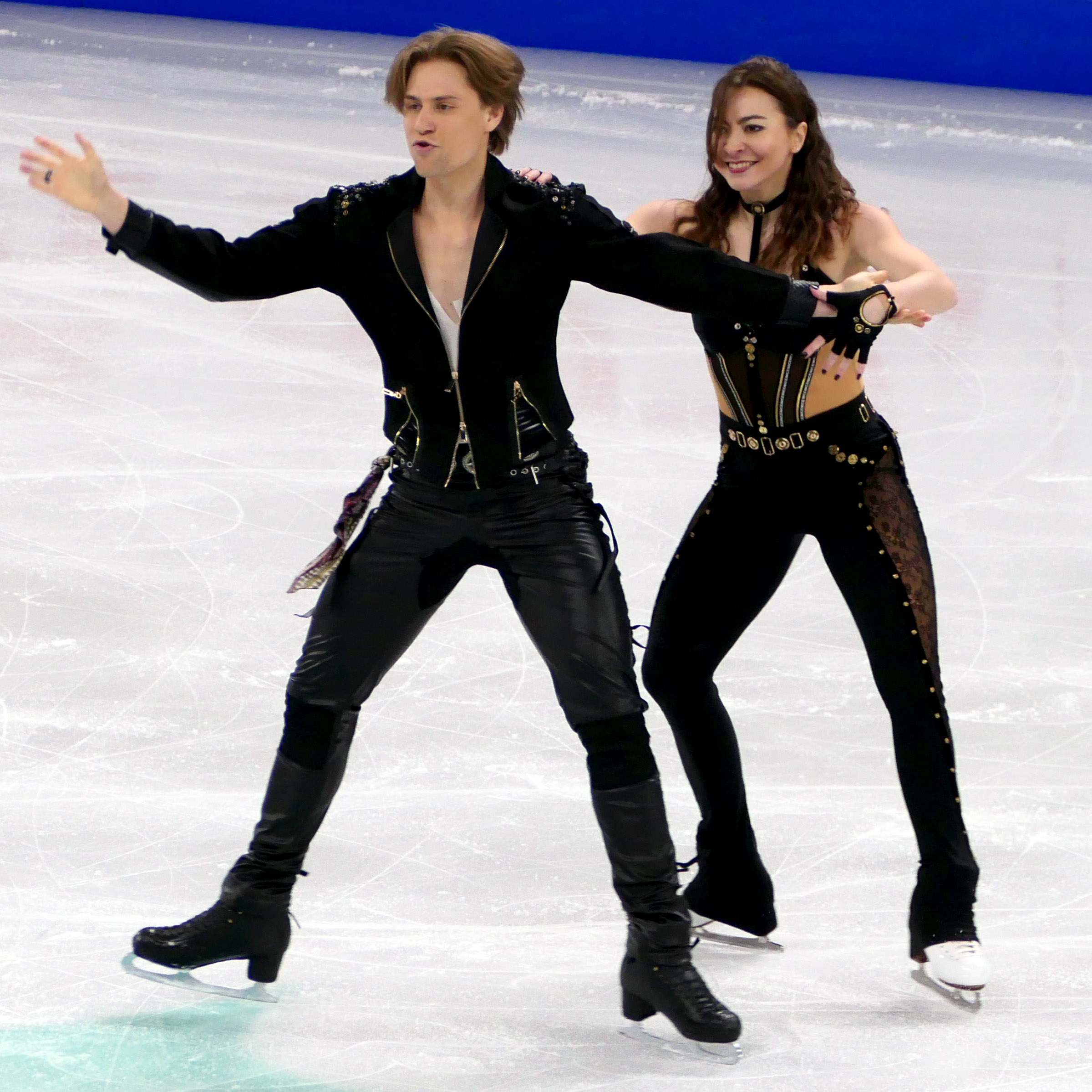
- Allison Reed and Saulius Ambrulevičius at the 2024 World Championships

Personal information
- Other names: Saul
- Born: 10 June 1992 (age 34) Kaunas, Lithuania
- Height: 1.76 m (5 ft 9 in)

Figure skating career
- Country: Lithuania
- Discipline: Ice dance (since 2014); Men's singles (2006–13)
- Partner: Allison Reed (since 2017); Taylor Tran (2014–17)
- Coach: Marie-France Dubreuil; Patrice Lauzon; Romain Haguenauer
- Skating club: Kaunas "Startas"
- Began skating: 1998

Medal record
Event	Gold medal – first place	Silver medal – second place	Bronze medal – third place
European Championships	0	0	1
Lithuanian Championships	14	0	0
Medal list
European Championships
Bronze medal – third place	2024 Kaunas	Ice dance
Lithuanian Championships
Gold medal – first place	2007 Kaunas	Singles
Gold medal – first place	2008 Kaunas	Singles
Gold medal – first place	2009 Kaunas	Singles
Gold medal – first place	2010 Riga	Singles
Gold medal – first place	2011 Kaunas	Singles
Gold medal – first place	2012 Kaunas	Singles
Gold medal – first place	2013 Kaunas	Singles
Gold medal – first place	2016 Kaunas	Ice dance
Gold medal – first place	2017 Ventspils	Ice dance
Gold medal – first place	2018 Kaunas	Ice dance
Gold medal – first place	2019 Kaunas	Ice dance
Gold medal – first place	2020 Kaunas	Ice dance
Gold medal – first place	2021 Kaunas	Ice dance
Gold medal – first place	2022 Kaunas	Ice dance

Saulius Ambrulevičius (born 10 June 1992) is a Lithuanian ice dancer. With current ice dance partner Allison Reed, they are the 2024 European bronze medalists, five-time ISU Grand Prix medalists, and seven-time ISU Challenger Series medalists (two golds, five silvers). They have finished in the top ten at four World Championships (2022, 2023, 2024, 2026).

With former ice dance partner Taylor Tran, he is the 2015 Pavel Roman Memorial silver medalist and 2015 Lithuanian national champion. They qualified to the free dance at the 2017 European Championships. As a single skater, he is the 2007 and 2008 Lithuanian national champion.

== Career ==
=== Single skating ===
Ambrulevičius was born in Kaunas and began learning to skate in 1998. He won the Lithuanian senior title for the first time in 2007. His first major international competition was the 2007 Junior Worlds; he placed 45th in the short program and did not qualify for the free skate.

In the 2007–08 season, Ambrulevičius won his second national title. He competed in the 2008 Junior Worlds and placed 47th. He competed at the 2008 World Championships, where he finished 45th.

=== Partnership with Tran ===
Around July 2014, Ambrulevičius teamed up with American skater Taylor Tran to compete in ice dancing for Lithuania. Their international debut came at the Tallinn Trophy in December 2014. At the Estonian event, they finished 5th and earned the minimum scores to appear at the 2015 European Championships in Stockholm. They missed the cut for the free dance in Sweden and at the 2016 European Championships in Bratislava, Slovakia.

Tran/Ambrulevičius qualified to the final segment at the 2017 European Championships in Ostrava, Czech Republic; they ranked 20th in the short dance, 17th in the free, and 18th overall. They announced the end of their partnership in April 2017, following the 2017 World Championships.

=== Partnership with Reed ===
==== 2017–18 season: Debut of Reed/Ambrulevičius ====
In spring 2017, it was announced that Ambrulevičius had teamed up with American-born ice dancer, Allison Reed, and that they would represent Lithuania while coached by Marina Zueva, Johnny Johns, Massimo Scali, and Oleg Epstein.

They made their competitive debut at the 2017 CS Ondrej Nepela Trophy, where they finished sixth. They then went on to place seventh at the 2017 CS Nebelhorn Trophy, fifth at the 2017 Santa Claus Cup, and eighth at the 2017 CS Tallinn Trophy.

Reed/Ambrulevičius won the gold medal at the 2017–18 Lithuanian Championships. Selected to compete at the 2018 World Championships in Milan, Italy, they finished twentieth overall.

==== 2018–19 season: Grand Prix debut ====
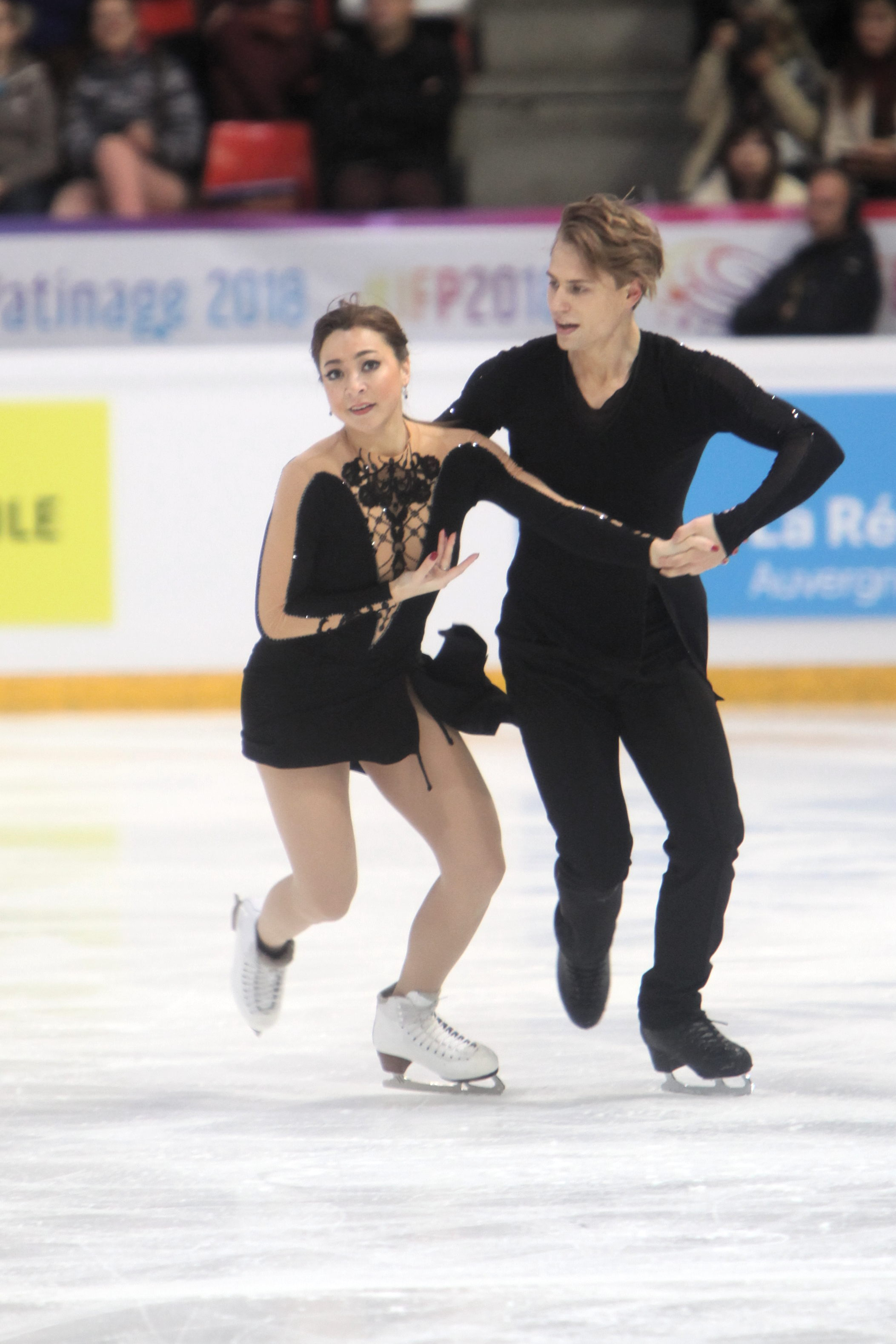
Reed/Ambrulevicius at the 2018 Internationaux de France

Reed/Ambrulevičius began their season at the 2018 Halloween Cup, where they won the silver medal, before going on to finish fifth at the 2018 Volvo Open Cup.

Debuting on the Grand Prix series, Reed/Ambrulevičius placed sixth at the 2018 Rostelecom Cup and ninth at the 2018 Internationaux de France. They then went on to win their second consecutive national title at the 2018–19 Lithuanian Championships.

Selected to compete at the 2019 European Championships in Minsk, Belarus, Reed/Ambrulevičius finished thirteenth, before going on to finish seventeenth at the 2019 World Championships in Saitama, Japan.

==== 2019–20 season ====
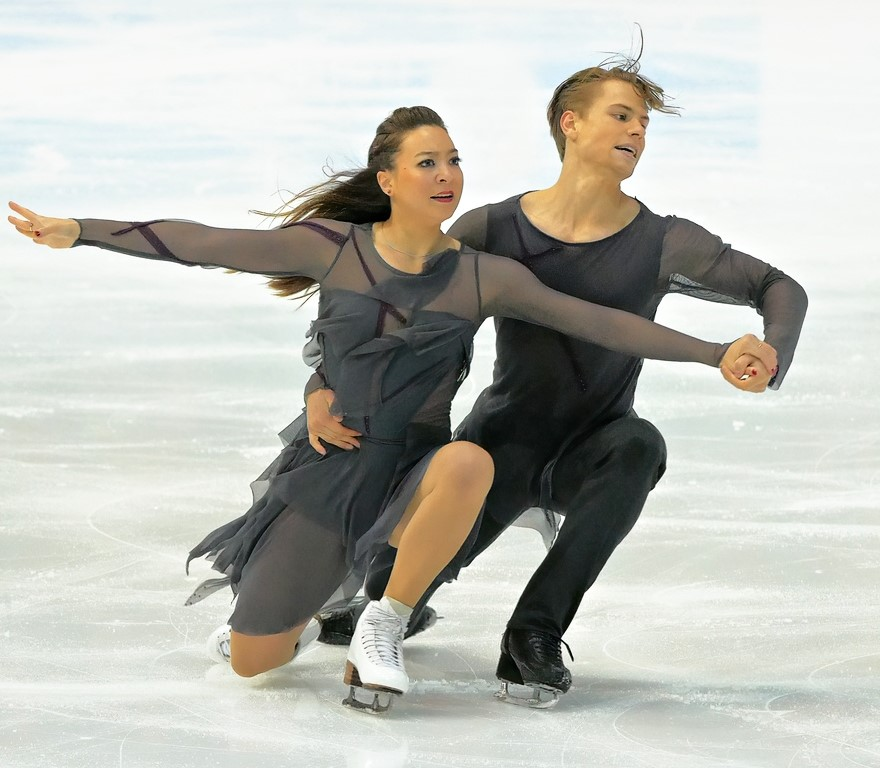
Reed/Ambrulevičius at the 2019 Internationaux de France

Reed/Ambrulevičius opened their season at the 2019 CS Lombardia Trophy, finishing sixth. They then went on to place seventh at the 2019 CS Nebelhorn Trophy and fifth at the 2019 CS Finlandia Trophy. Competing on the 2019–20 Grand Prix series, Reed/Ambrulevičius placed tenth at the 2019 Internationaux de France and fifth at the 2019 Rostelecom Cup.

After winning their third national title at the 2019–20 Lithuanian Championships, Reed/Ambrulevičius went on to finish eleventh at the 2020 European Championships in Graz, Austria and win the gold medal at the 2020 Bavarian Open.

Although selected to compete at the 2020 World Championships, the event was ultimately cancelled due to the onset of the COVID-19 pandemic.

==== 2020–21 season ====
Reed/Ambrulevičius switched coaches from Marina Zueva to Maurizio Margaglio prior to the season. They began the season with a seventh-place finish at the 2020 Rostelecom Cup, before going on to win their fourth national title at the 2020–21 Lithuanian Championships.

At the 2021 World Championships in Stockholm, Sweden, Reed/Ambrulevičius placed fifteenth.

==== 2021–22 season ====
Prior to the season, Reed/Ambrulevičius relocated to Montreal, Quebec, Canada to train under Marie-France Dubreuil, Patrice Lauzon, and Romain Haguenauer. Despite Reed/Ambrulevičius qualifying a spot for a Lithuanian dance team at the 2022 Winter Olympics with their place at the 2021 World Championships, it was announced in October 2021 that Reed's application for Lithuanian citizenship was denied, thus ending their bid for the Winter Olympics.

Reed/Ambrulevičius nonetheless began their season at the 2021 Budapest Trophy, where they took the silver medal. On the Grand Prix series, Reed/Ambrulevičius placed eighth at the 2021 Internationaux de France and seventh at the 2021 Rostelecom Cup. They then won the silver medal at the 2021 CS Golden Spin of Zagreb as well as their fifth national title at the 2021–22 Lithuanian Championships.

At the 2022 European Championships in Tallinn, Estonia, Reed/Ambrulevičius finished eighth, before going on to finish tenth at the 2022 World Championships in Montpellier, France.

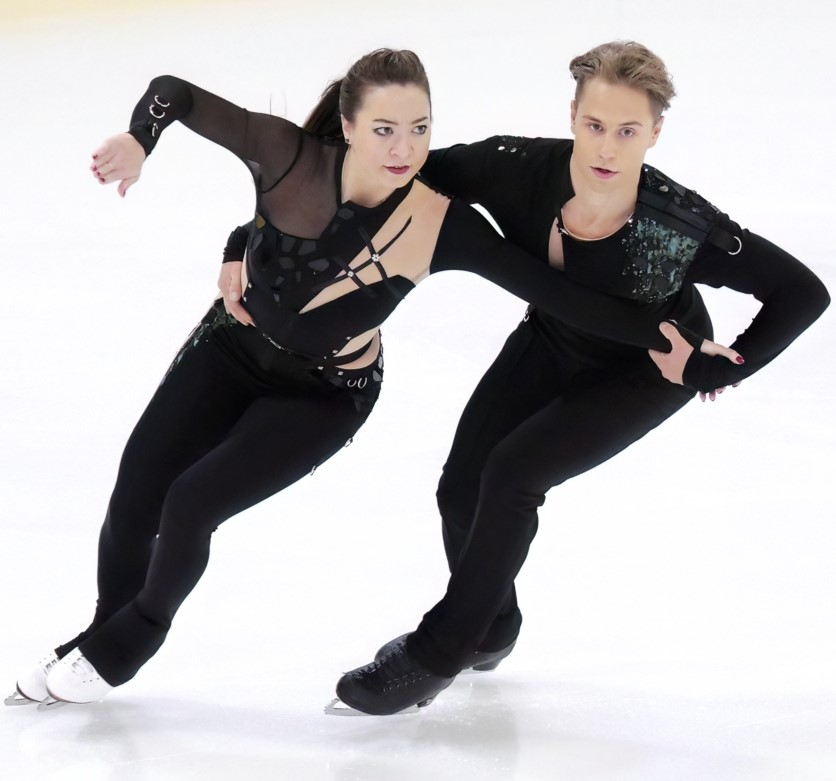
Reed/Ambrulevičius at the 2022 CS Lombardia Trophy

==== 2022–23 season ====
Reed/Ambrulevičius opened their season by winning silver at both the 2022 CS Lombardia Trophy and the 2022 CS Nebelhorn Trophy. Although they withdrew from the 2022 Skate America, they did compete at the 2022 NHK Trophy, where they finished fourth.

Reed/Ambrulevičius went on to win the silver medal at the 2022 CS Golden Spin of Zagreb, before competing at the 2023 European Championships in Espoo, Finland, where they achieved a career-best fourth-place finish. They were only 2.54 points out of third place. They ended their season at the 2023 World Championships in Saitama, Japan, where they finished seventh.

==== 2023–24 season: Grand Prix bronzes and Europeans bronze ====
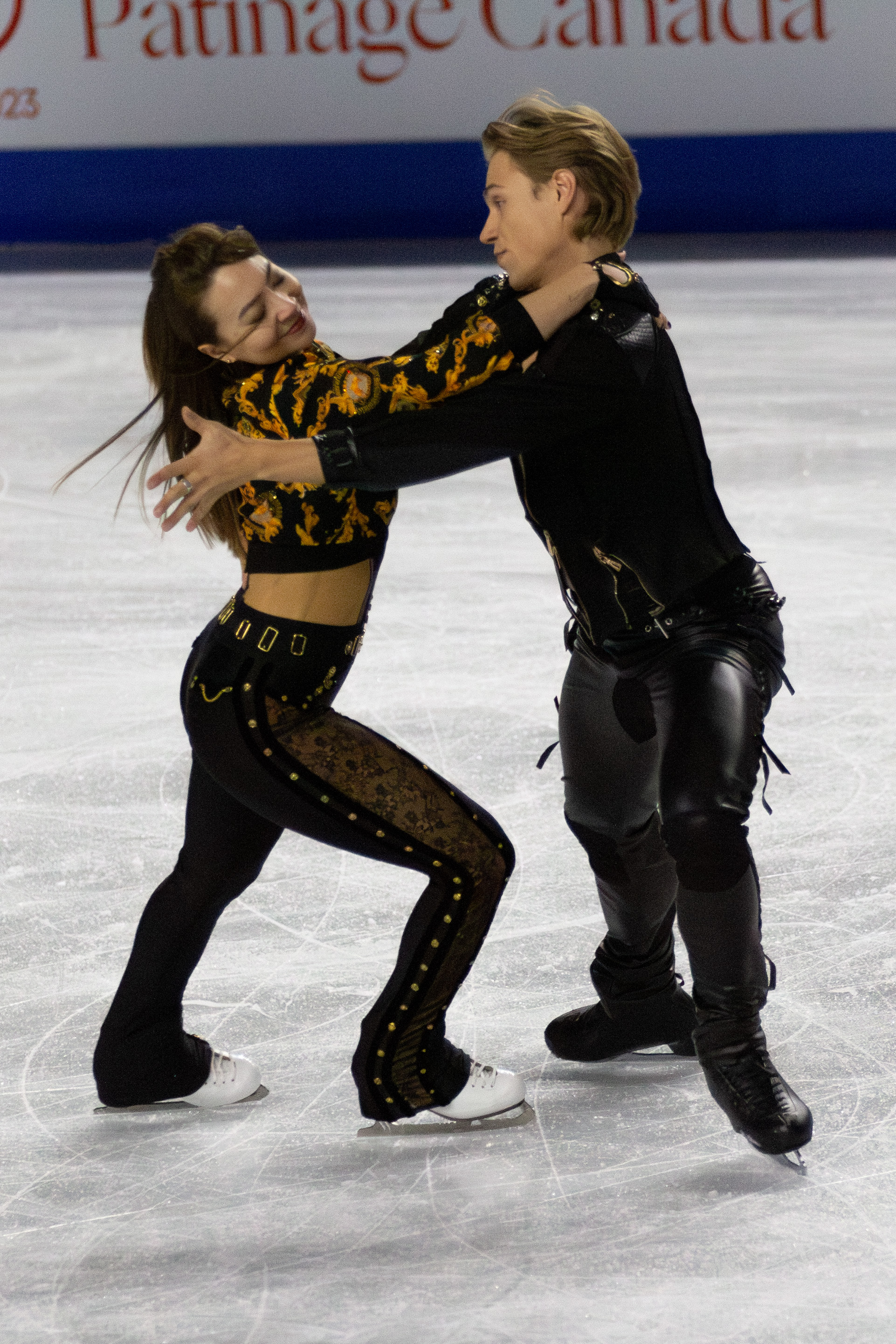
Reed/Ambrulevicius at the 2023 Skate Canada International

Beginning the season at the 2023 CS Nebelhorn Trophy, Reed/Ambrulevičius won the silver medal at the event for the second consecutive season. Given two assignments on the Grand Prix, they began at the 2023 Skate Canada International, this time held in Vancouver. They finished third in both segments, winning the bronze medal, their first on the circuit. It was the first Grand Prix medal for Lithuania since Drobiazko/Vanagas's silver at the 2001 NHK Trophy. They won another bronze medal at their second event, the 2023 NHK Trophy. Reed/Ambrulevičius were named as first alternates to the Grand Prix Final.

Reed/Ambrulevičius concluded the first half of the season at the 2023 CS Golden Spin of Zagreb, where they won the gold medal, their first Challenger title.

With the 2024 European Championships being hosted on home ice in Kaunas, Reed/Ambrulevičius entered the event as the medal hopes of the nation. They finished third in the rhythm dance, before setting new personal bests in the free dance and total score to come third there as well, taking the bronze medal, their first time on an ISU championship podium. The free dance occurred on Lithuania's Day of the Defenders of Freedom, which Ambrulevičius noted as significant. The duo's success brought renewed attention to the issue of Reed's Lithuanian citizenship application. On February 9, Reed announced that she was renew her bid for citizenship.

The 2024 World Championships were held in Montreal, Quebec, Canada, the location of the team's training base. Reed/Ambrulevičius finished a career-best sixth overall.

==== 2024–25 season ====
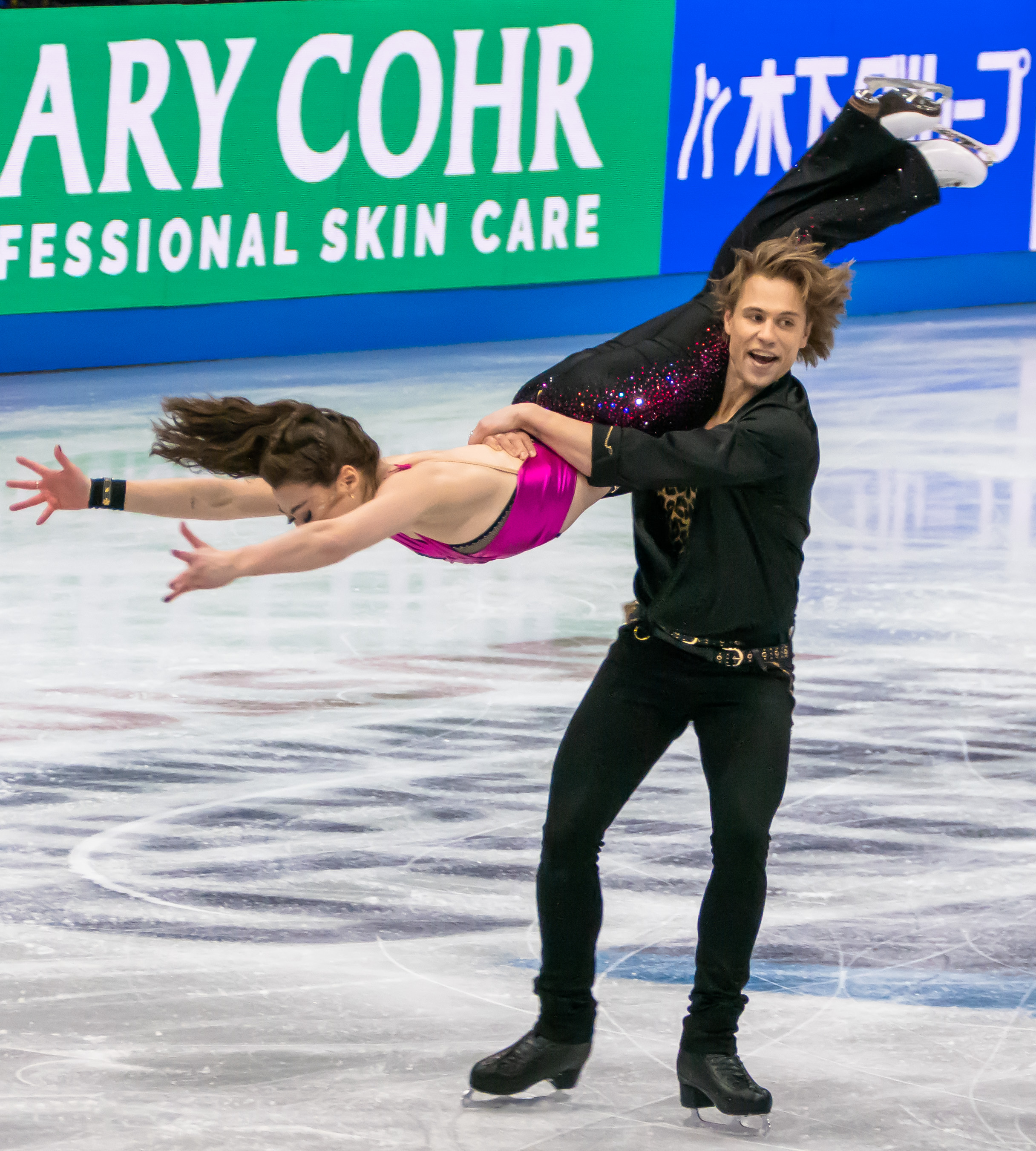
Reed/Ambrulevicius performing a lift during their rhythm dance at the 2025 World Championships

During summer preparations, Reed's skate blade injured Ambrulevičius' hand twice, as a result delaying their start by a month. They discarded their initial plan to compete at the 2024 CS Nebelhorn Trophy. Reed/Ambrulevičius instead began their season on the Challenger series at the 2024 CS Trophée Métropole Nice Côte d'Azur, where they won the gold medal. Going on to compete on the 2024–25 Grand Prix circuit, Reed/Ambrulevičius finished fourth at the 2024 Grand Prix de France, having struggled with level issues. The following week they competed at their second event, the 2024 NHK Trophy, where they won the bronze medal, despite lost twizzle levels in the free dance.

Following the Grand Prix, the issue of Reed's bid for Lithuanian citizenship came to a head, following an October recommendation by Lithuania's citizenship committee that she be granted citizenship, with her sporting achievements cited as "special merits to the country." On November 18, Reed met with President Gitanas Nausėda at the Presidential Palace in Vilnius, and told reporters afterward that it had "been a long journey to this moment, but now I'm very happy. I think it went very well." On November 21, Nausėda decreed that her request be granted. Reed took the oath of allegiance in a ceremony at the Lithuanian embassy to Canada in Ottawa on December 17.

At the 2025 European Championships in Tallinn, Estonia, Reed and Ambrulevičius finished in sixth place. At the 2025 World Championships in Boston, Massachusetts, United States, they skated in the penultimate group of the rhythm dance, and performed shortly after the Finnish team of Juulia Turkkila and Matthias Versluis had unexpectedly fallen and appeared poised to miss qualification for the free dance by one ordinal. However, Reed also fell in the segment, and as a result, Reed and Ambrulevičius finished twenty-first, missing the free dance.

==== 2025–26 season: Milano Cortina Olympics, Worlds and Europeans ====
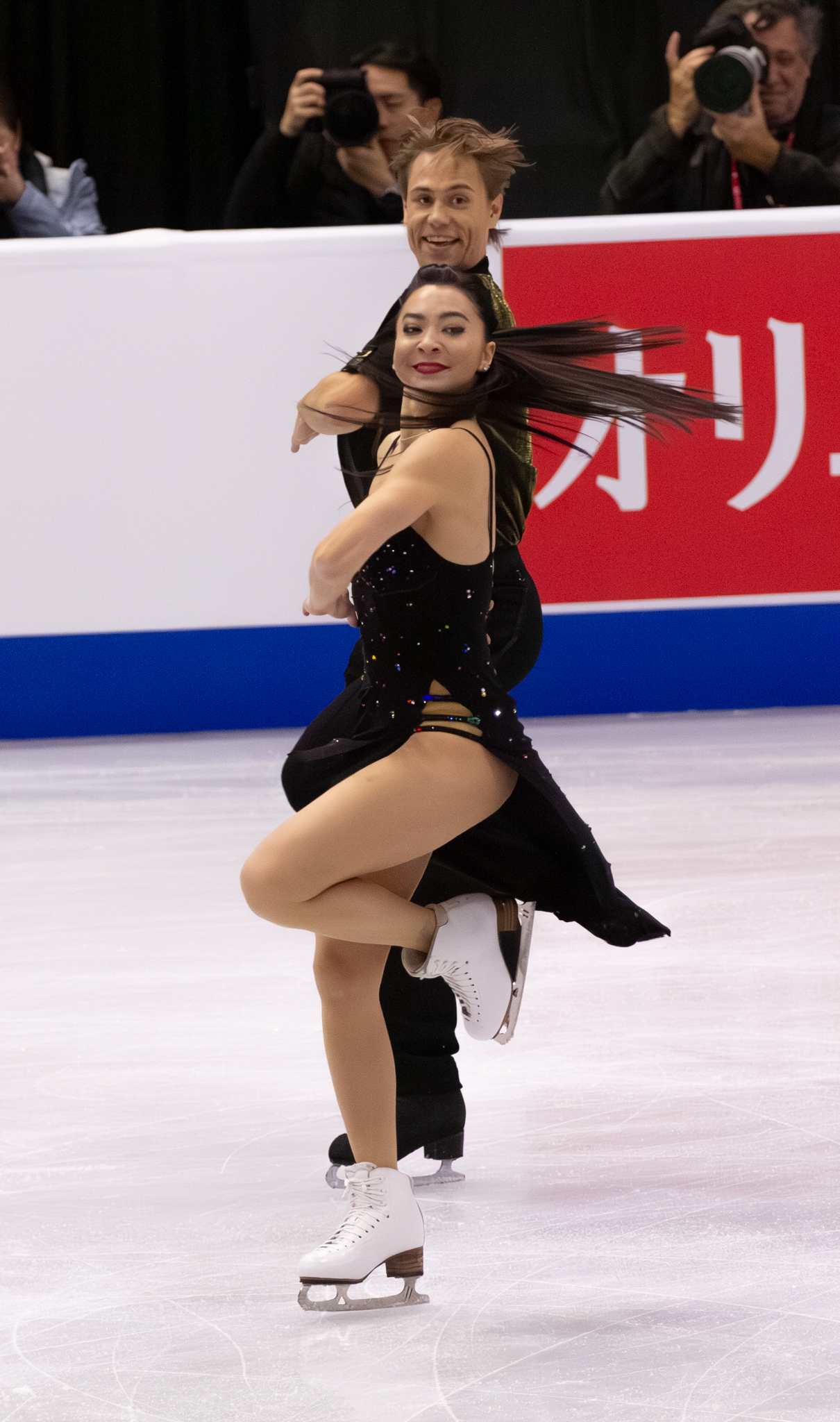
Reed/Ambrulevicius performing twizzles during their rhythm dance at 2025 Skate Canada International

Reed/Ambrulevičius opened their season by winning the Skate to Milano by a significant margin, earning a spot at the 2026 Winter Olympics.

The team later placed second at 2025 Bolero Cup before competing at 2025 Grand Prix de France where they took the bronze.

Reed/Ambrulevičius went on to finished second at 2025 Skate Canada International. They place second in the Rhythm dance and first in the Free dance (ice dance).

The following month, Reed/Ambrulevičius placed fifth at the 2025–26 Grand Prix Final.

In January, Reed/Ambrulevičius placed fifth at the 2026 European Championships.

In early February, it was announced that Reed and Ambrulevičius had been selected as flag bearers for Lithuania for the 2026 Winter Olympic opening ceremony.

On February 9, Reed/Ambrulevičius competed in the rhythm dance segment at the 2026 Winter Olympics, placing seventh. Two days later, the team placed seventh in the free dance to finish in sixth place overall.

The following month, Reed/Ambrulevičius placed seventh at the 2026 World Figure Skating Championships in their eighth appearance at this event.

== Programs ==
=== Ice dance with Allison Reed ===
Season	Short dance	Free dance	Exhibition
2025–2026	Would You...? by Touch and Go; Cantaloop (Flip Fantasia) by Us3 & Gerard Presencer; I'm Too Sexy (Bettys Mix) by Right Said Fred choreo. by Marie France Dubreuil, Samuel Chouinard	God Is a DJ (Remix) by Faithless & Jason Howes; We Come 1 by Faithless choreo. by Marie France Dubreuil, Samuel Chouinard	Welcome to the Jungle; Paradise City; Welcome to the Jungle by Guns N' Roses choreo. by Marie France Dubreuil, Samuel Chouinard
2024–2025	Da Ya Think I'm Sexy? by Rod Stewart; Da Ya Think I'm Sexy? (Blow-up Remix) performed by Claudio Camaione, Paolo Cilione, & Rod Stewart; Da Ya Think I'm Sexy? (Extended Version) by N-Trance & Rod Stewart choreo. by Marie France Dubreuil, Samuel Chouinard	Lord & Master by Apashe; Never Change (Acoustic) by Apashe & YMIR; Kryptonite by Apashe & Lia Kuri choreo. by Marie France Dubreuil, Samuel Chouinard	Only by RY X
2023–2024	Welcome to the Jungle; Paradise City; Welcome to the Jungle by Guns N' Roses choreo. by Marie France Dubreuil, Samuel Chouinard	Enough of our Machines by Son Lux; Children by Tokio Myers choreo. by Marie France Dubreuil, Samuel Chouinard	Insomnia by Faithless choreo. by Marie France Dubreuil, Samuel Chouinard, Massimo Scali
2022–2023	Mambo: How How; Rhumba: Starlight Scene; Samba: On the Run by Yello choreo. by Marie France Dubreuil, Samuel Chouinard, Massimo Scali	Insomnia by Faithless choreo. by Marie France Dubreuil, Samuel Chouinard, Massimo Scali	Švelnumas by Gabrielė Vilkickytė
2021–2022	Old Friend by Elderbrook; Blues: Hazey by Glass Animals; Blue Monday (Vandalism Remix) by Kurd Maverick choreo. by Massimo Scali, Margarita Drobiazko, Povilas Vanagas	Vinegar & Salt by Hooverphonic; White Lies by Karl Hugo; Lacrimosa choreo. by Massimo Scali, Margarita Drobiazko, Povilas Vanagas	On Fire by The Roop
2020–2021	Blues: Love Will Come and Find Me Again; Quickstep: You Deserve It (from Bandstand) by Richard Oberacker, Robert Taylor choreo. by Massimo Scali	Churchyard; It Happened Quiet; Soft Universe by Aurora choreo. by Massimo Scali	
2019–2020	Blues: Love Will Come and Find Me Again; Quickstep: You Deserve It (from Bandstand) by Richard Oberacker, Robert Taylor choreo. by Massimo Scali	Churchyard; It Happened Quiet; Soft Universe by Aurora choreo. by Massimo Scali	
2018–2019	Tango: Ojos Negros; Tango: Idilio; Tango: Zita choreo. by Massimo Scali, Marina Zueva	Crazy by Gnarls Barkley (Space Jazz Cover feat. Hannah Gill and Casey Abrams) choreo. by Massimo Scali, Marina Zueva	
2017–2018	Samba: Light It Up (Samba remix); Rhumba: Addicted to You (Rhumba remix); Samba: Destination Calibria by Alex Gaudino choreo. by Massimo Scali, Marina Zueva	Stairway to Heaven by Led Zeppelin choreo. by Massimo Scali, Marina Zueva	

=== Ice dance with Taylor Tran ===
Season	Short dance	Free dance
2016–2017	Blues: Goodnight Moon by Shivaree; Rock'n'Roll	Adagio pour piano by Saint-Preux
2015–2016	Carousel; The Carousel Waltz; June Is Busting Out All Over	Nights of Cabiria by Nino Rota
2014–2015	Paso doble: La Paloma; Paso doble: El Classico Taurino	Evita by Andrew Lloyd Webber; Waltz for Evita; Don't Cry For Me Argentina; A New Argentina

=== Single skating ===
Season	Short program	Free skating
2013–2014	Tears of the Sun by Hans Zimmer	Sherlock Holmes by Hans Zimmer
2012–2013	The Hunchback of Notre Dame	Sherlock Holmes by Hans Zimmer
2011–2012	The Hunchback of Notre Dame	28 Days Later
2010–2011	Quixote by Bond	28 Days Later
2009–2010	Quixote by Bond	Bandits of St. Petersburg by Igor Kornelyuk
2008–2009	El Conquistador by Maxime Rodriguez	Bandits of St. Petersburg by Igor Kornelyuk
2007–2008	Nu Ar Det Vi by Tobias Kessler	Bandits of St. Petersburg by Igor Kornelyuk
2006–2007	Blues	Jazz medley

== Competitive highlights ==
- GP – Event of the ISU Grand Prix Series
- JGP – Event of the ISU Junior Grand Prix Series
- CS – Event of the ISU Challenger Series
- TBD – Assigned
- WD – Withdrew from competition
- C – Event was cancelled

=== Ice dance with Allison Reed ===
Competition placements at senior level
Season	2017–18	2018–19	2019–20	2020–21	2021–22	2022–23	2023–24	2024–25	2025–26
Winter Olympics									6th
World Championships	20th	17th	C	15th	10th	7th	6th	21st	7th
European Championships		13th	11th		8th	4th	3rd	6th	5th
Grand Prix Final									5th
Lithuanian Championships	1st	1st	1st	1st	1st				
GP France		9th	10th		8th			4th	3rd
GP NHK Trophy						4th	3rd	3rd	
GP Rostelecom Cup		6th	5th	7th	7th				
GP Skate Canada							3rd		2nd
CS Finlandia Trophy			5th						
CS Golden Spin of Zagreb					2nd	2nd	1st		
CS Lombardia Trophy			6th			2nd			
CS Nebelhorn Trophy	7th		7th			2nd	2nd		
CS Ondrej Nepela Trophy	6th								
CS Tallinn Trophy	8th								
CS Trophée Métropole Nice								1st	
Bavarian Open			1st						
Bolero Cup									2nd
Budapest Trophy					2nd				
Egna Dance Trophy								1st	
Halloween Cup		2nd							
Santa Claus Cup	5th								
Skate to Milano									1st
Volvo Open Cup		5th							

=== Ice dance with Taylor Tran ===
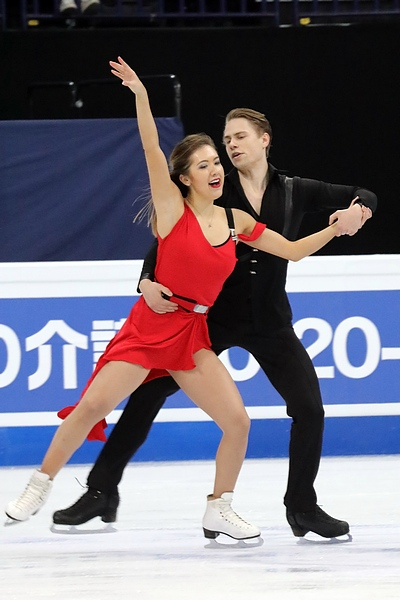
Tran and Ambrulevičius at the 2017 World Championships

Competition placements at senior level
Season	2014–15	2015–16	2016–17
World Championships			30th
European Championships	24th	25th	18th
Lithuanian Championships		1st	1st
CS Finlandia Trophy			8th
CS Ondrej Nepela Memorial			9th
CS U.S. Classic		8th	
CS Warsaw Cup		6th	
Autumn Classic		7th	
Bavarian Open		11th	
NRW Trophy			5th
Pavel Roman Memorial		2nd	
Tallinn Trophy	5th		

=== Single skating ===
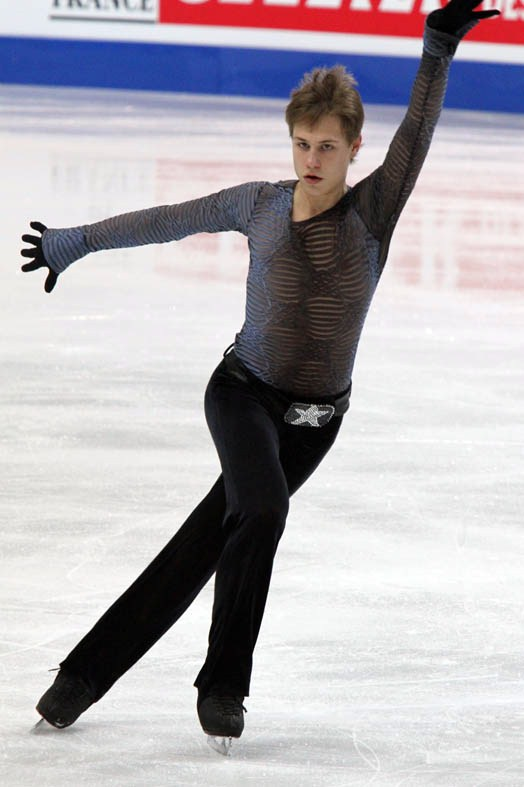
Saulius Ambrulevičius at the 2011 European Championships

Competition placements at senior level
Season	2006–07	2007–08	2008–09	2009–10	2010–11	2011–12	2012–13	2013–14
World Championships		45th	49th	38th		42nd		
European Championships			37th	34th	34th		28th	
Lithuanian Championships	1st	1st	1st	1st	1st	1st	1st	
Estonian Championships (Note: Saulius Ambrulevičius competed as a guest skater.)			2nd					
Golden Spin of Zagreb							7th	
Ice Challenge						17th		
Nebelhorn Trophy					21st			30th
NRW Trophy					23rd	13th	27th	
Ondrej Nepela Memorial						17th		
Warsaw Cup							13th	11th
Winter Universiade					26th			

Competition placements at junior level
Season	2006–07	2007–08	2008–09	2009–10	2010–11
World Junior Championships	45th	47th	33rd	32nd	38th
JGP Czech Republic					16th
JGP France			18th		
JGP Great Britain		26th			13th
JGP Hungary				16th	
JGP Poland				17th	
European Youth Olympic Festival	17th				
Warsaw Cup			10th		

== Detailed results ==
=== Ice dance with Allison Reed ===
ISU personal best scores in the +5/-5 GOE System
Segment	Type	Score	Event
Total	TSS	204.66	2026 Winter Olympics
Short program	TSS	83.08	2026 European Championships
Short program	TES	47.86	2026 Winter Olympics
Short program	PCS	35.35	2026 European Championships
Free skating	TSS	122.64	2024 European Championships
Free skating	TES	68.93	2026 Winter Olympics
Free skating	PCS	53.86	2024 European Championships

Results in the 2025–26 season
Date	Event	RD		FD		Total	
Date	Event	P	Score	P	Score	P	Score
Sep 5–6, 2025	(United Kingdom) 2025 Bolero Cup	2	76.31	1	121.19	2	197.50
Sep 18–21, 2025	(China) 2025 ISU Skate to Milano	1	80.95	1	117.78	1	198.73
Oct 17–19, 2025	2025 Grand Prix de France	2	80.98	3	120.07	3	201.05
Oct 31 – Nov 2, 2025	2025 Skate Canada International	2	80.89	1	120.03	2	200.92
Dec 4–7, 2025	(Japan) 2025–26 Grand Prix Final	5	79.48	5	120.13	5	199.61
Jan 13–18, 2026	(United Kingdom) 2026 European Championships	4	83.08	7	117.21	5	200.29
Feb 9–11, 2026	(Italy) 2026 Winter Olympics	7	82.95	7	121.71	6	204.66
Mar 24–29, 2026	(Czech Republic) 2026 World Championships	9	79.66	6	121.00	7	200.66

2024–2025 season
Date	Event	RD	FD	Total
March 24–30, 2025	2025 World Championships	21; 68.08	–	21; 68.08
February 7–9, 2025	2025 Egna Dance Trophy	1; 80.62	1; 114.02	1; 194.64
January 28 – February 2, 2025	2025 European Championships	5; 78.67	7; 117.99	6; 196.66
November 8–10, 2024	2024 NHK Trophy	3; 77.91	3; 117.61	3; 195.52
November 1–3, 2024	2024 Grand Prix de France	3; 74.49	4; 110.75	4; 185.24
October 16–20, 2024	2024 CS Trophée Métropole Nice Côte d'Azur	1; 77.96	2; 111.97	1; 189.93
2023–2024 season
Date	Event	RD	FD	Total
March 18–24, 2024	2024 World Championships	6; 80.99	9; 119.97	6; 200.96
January 8–14, 2024	2024 European Championships	3; 80.73	3; 122.64	3; 203.37
December 6–9, 2023	2023 CS Golden Spin of Zagreb	1; 81.19	1; 118.92	1; 200.11
November 24–26, 2023	2023 NHK Trophy	3; 78.71	3; 118.15	3; 196.86
October 27–29, 2023	2023 Skate Canada International	3; 75.60	3; 116.41	3; 192.01
September 20–23, 2023	2023 CS Nebelhorn Trophy	2; 73.62	2; 116.93	2; 190.55
2022–23 season
Date	Event	RD	FD	Total
March 22–26, 2023	2023 World Championships	7; 78.70	7; 120.50	7; 199.20
January 25–29, 2023	2023 European Championships	4; 77.33	4; 118.34	4; 195.67
December 7–10, 2022	2022 CS Golden Spin of Zagreb	1; 77.21	2; 112.26	2; 189.47
November 18–20, 2022	2022 NHK Trophy	4; 75.23	3; 114.75	4; 189.98
September 21–24, 2022	2022 CS Nebelhorn Trophy	2; 78.98	2; 106.43	2; 185.41
September 16–19, 2022	2022 CS Lombardia Trophy	3; 71.95	2; 111.65	2; 183.60
2021–22 season
Date	Event	RD	FD	Total
March 21–27, 2022	2022 World Championships	10; 74.06	11; 106.15	10; 180.21
January 10–16, 2022	2022 European Championships	7; 74.45	8; 108.72	8; 183.17
December 7–11, 2021	2021 CS Golden Spin of Zagreb	1; 75.81	4; 104.34	2; 180.15
November 26–28, 2021	2021 Rostelecom Cup	7; 71.43	8; 106.45	7; 177.88
November 19–21, 2021	2021 Internationaux de France	8; 64.43	6; 105.40	8; 169.83
October 14–17, 2021	2021 Budapest Trophy	1; 72.05	2; 108.96	2; 181.01
2020–21 season
Date	Event	RD	FD	Total
March 22–28, 2021	2021 World Championships	15; 71.29	15; 106.89	15; 178.18
November 20–22, 2020	2020 Rostelecom Cup	7; 72.43	7; 110.13	7; 182.56
2019–20 season
Date	Event	RD	FD	
February 3–9, 2020	2020 Bavarian Open	1; 68.79	1; 108.99	1; 177.78
January 20–26, 2020	2020 European Championships	8; 73.22	13; 101.02	11; 174.24
November 15–17, 2019	2019 Rostelecom Cup	5; 69.79	6; 105.64	5; 175.43
November 1–3, 2019	2019 Internationaux de France	10; 60.99	9; 100.74	10; 161.73
October 11–13, 2019	2019 CS Finlandia Trophy	5; 70.61	6; 97.72	5; 168.33
September 25–28, 2019	2019 CS Nebelhorn Trophy	7; 73.41	7; 106.72	7; 180.13
September 13–15, 2019	2019 CS Lombardia Trophy	3; 69.22	6; 98.26	6; 167.48
2018–19 season
Date	Event	RD	FD	Total
March 18–24, 2019	2019 World Championships	16; 67.21	17; 100.85	17; 168.06
January 21–27. 2019	2019 European Championships	12; 64.81	14; 99.30	13; 164.11
November 23–25, 2018	2018 Internationaux de France	9; 59.77	9; 93.50	9; 153.27
November 16–18, 2018	2018 Rostelecom Cup	5; 64.54	6; 93.49	6; 158.03
November 6–11, 2018	2018 Volvo Open Cup	4; 59.96	6; 93.82	5; 153.78
October 19–21, 2018	2018 Halloween Cup	2; 61.80	3; 94.31	2; 156.11
2017–18 season
Date	Event	SD	FD	Total
March 19–25, 2018	2018 World Championships	18; 61.33	20; 86.97	20; 148.30
December 4–10, 2017	2017 Santa Claus Cup	4; 60.82	6; 86.00	5; 146.82
November 21–26, 2017	2017 CS Tallinn Trophy	7; 55.02	9; 81.66	8; 136.68
September 27–30, 2017	2017 CS Nebelhorn Trophy	4; 58.34	8; 84.61	7; 142.95
September 21–23, 2017	2017 CS Ondrej Nepela Trophy	8; 51.74	4; 86.66	6; 138.40

Olympic Games
Preceded by Deividas Kizala and Paulina Ramanauskaitė	Flagbearer for Lithuania (with Allison Reed); Milano Cortina 2026	Succeeded by
