= Mutator =

Mutator may refer to:

== Science and technology ==
- Mutator method, an object method that changes the state of the object
- Mutator, the application program which mutates the object dependency graph in garbage collection
- Mutator genotype, a genotype that exhibits high rates of mutation
- Mutator, the central shaft in some scraped surface heat exchangers

== Other uses ==
- Mutator (comics), the nickname of a paranormal in Marvel Comics comic DP7, in the New Universe imprint
- Mutators, mods in the Unreal series
- Mutator (album), 2021 music release by Alan Vega

== See also ==
- Mutation (disambiguation)
