= Transmutation =

Transmutation may refer to:

== Pseudoscience and science ==
=== Alchemy ===
- Chrysopoeia and argyropoeia, the transmutations of base metals, such as lead or copper, into gold and silver
- Magnum opus (alchemy), the creation of the philosopher's stone
- Mental transmutation, the change of a mental state

=== Biology ===
- Biological transmutation, the claim that nuclear transmutation occurs in living organisms
- Transmutation of species, the change of one species into another

=== Physics ===
- Dimensional transmutation, a physical mechanism providing a linkage between a dimensionless parameter and a dimensionful parameter
- Nuclear transmutation, the conversion of a chemical element or isotope into another chemical element or isotope

=== Other uses in pseudoscience and science ===
- Sexual transmutation, a deflection of sexual instincts into non-sexual activity

== Arts and entertainment ==
=== Film and television ===
- Transmutations (film), a 1985 British horror film
- Transmutate, a fictional character in the Beast Wars franchise

=== Music ===
- Transmutation (album), a 2008 album by Ophiolatry
- Transmutation (Mutatis Mutandis), a 1992 album by Praxis

== See also ==
- Mutation (disambiguation)
- Transformation (disambiguation)
- Transubstantiation, the change of the whole substance of bread into the substance of the Body of Christ and of the whole substance of wine into the substance of the Blood of Christ
