= Vasili Rogov =

Israeli ice dancer

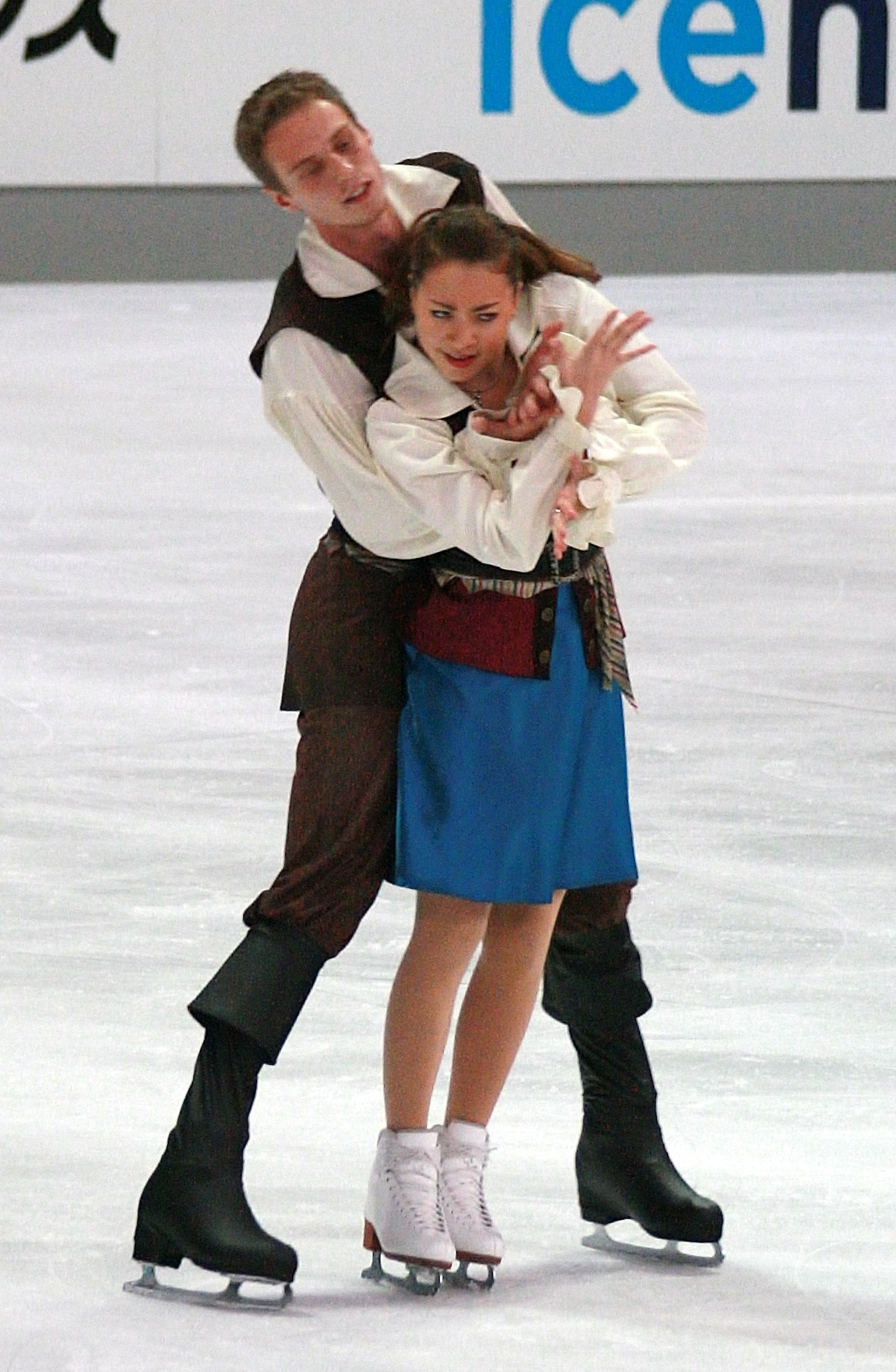
- Rogov at the 2013 Nebelhorn Trophy

Personal information
- Native name: וסילי רוגוב
- Born: November 3, 1991 (age 34) Minsk, Belarus
- Height: 1.86 m (6 ft 1 in)

Figure skating career
- Country: Israel
- Partner: Allison Reed, Ekaterina Bugrov, Olga Klimkovich
- Coach: Galit Chait Moracci, Tyler Myles, Alexei Gorshkov, John Kerr, Inese Bucevica
- Skating club: Israel ISF; Kochavim on the Ice, Kiryat Shmona
- Began skating: 1998

Vasili Rogov (Hebrew: וסילי רוגוב; born November 3, 1991) is an Israeli ice dancer. With Allison Reed, he is the 2014 Tallinn Trophy champion and 2015 Bavarian Open silver medalist. They qualified for the free dance at two ISU Championships.

== Skating career ==
Rogov began learning to skate in 1998. After an early partnership with Olga Klimkovich, he teamed up with Ekaterina Bugrov in the summer of 2010. Bugrov/Rogov competed together for two seasons, representing Israel. They appeared at four ISU Championships – the 2011 World Junior Championships in Gangneung, South Korea; the 2012 World Junior Championships in Minsk, Belarus; the 2012 European Championships in Sheffield, England; and the 2012 World Championships in Nice, France – but never qualified for the free dance. They were coached by Galit Chait Moracci and Inese Bucevica in Hackensack, New Jersey.

In 2012, Rogov teamed up with Allison Reed. They withdrew from the 2013 European Championships, held in Zagreb, due to Rogov's illness. In their third season together, Reed/Rogov won gold at the Tallinn Trophy and silver at the Bavarian Open. They also reached the free dance at two ISU Championships – 2015 Europeans in Stockholm and 2015 Worlds in Shanghai. They were coached by Galit Chait Moracci, Tyler Myles, Alexei Gorshkov, and John Kerr in Hackensack.

== Programs ==
=== With Reed ===
Season	Short dance	Free dance
2014–2015	Flamenco; Paso doble	Romeo + Juliet by Nellee Hooper, Craig Armstrong, Marius de Vries
2013–2014	Foxtrot: Hit the Road Jack; Quickstep: Rhythm	Pirates of the Caribbean; Up Is Down by Hans Zimmer; He's A Pirate by Klaus Badelt; Two Hornpipes (Tortuga) by Hans Zimmer; Moonlight Serenade by Klaus Badelt
2012–2013	Waltz: Claudia's Waltz; Polka: A Rambler's Life by The Dreadnoughts	Bacchanale (from Samson and Delilah) by Camille Saint-Saëns

=== With Bugrov ===
Season	Short dance	Free dance
2011–2012	Cha Cha Danzon; Rhumba: La Playa; Samba: Mas que nada performed by the Black Eyed Peas	Beethoven's Last Night by Trans-Siberian Orchestra
2010–2011	Waltz: That's Amore by Dean Martin	Desert Rose

== Competitive highlights ==
CS: Challenger Series; JGP: Junior Grand Prix

=== With Reed ===
International
Event	2012–13	2013–14	2014–15
World Champ.	23rd	30th	20th
European Champ.	WD	24th	16th
CS Finlandia Trophy			5th
CS Nebelhorn Trophy			6th
CS Volvo Open Cup			6th
Bavarian Open			2nd
Golden Spin	7th	7th	
Nebelhorn Trophy	13th	18th	
NRW Trophy	6th	4th	
Pavel Roman Memorial	10th		
Tallinn Trophy			1st
Ukrainian Open		6th	
U.S. Classic		10th	
National
Ukraine		6th	
WD = Withdrew

=== With Bugrov ===
International
Event	2010–11	2011–12
World Champ.		19th PR
European Champ.		17th PR
International: Junior
World Junior Champ.	15th PR	13th PR
JGP Czech Republic	18th	
JGP Latvia		15th
JGP Romania		9th
Ice Challenge	6th J	1st J
Mont Blanc Trophy	8th J	
Santa Claus Cup	11th J	6th J
Toruń Cup		2nd J
J = Junior level

== See also ==
- Sports in Israel
