= Mutation (disambiguation) =

A mutation is a change in the sequence of an organism's genetic material.

Mutation, mutations, or mutate may also refer to:

== Film, television, and literature ==
- Mutation (novel), a 1990 medical thriller by Robin Cook
- Savage Land Mutates, a group of mutants in Marvel Comics
- Human Mutation, a peer-reviewed medical journal of human genetics
- The Mutations, a 1974 British horror film, also released as The Freakmaker
- The Mutation (novel), a book in the Animorphs series, by K.A. Applegate
- “Mutations”, an episode of The Good Doctor

== Music ==
- Mutation, the process of changing hexachords in medieval music theory
- Mutation (organ stop), a type of organ stop that does not sound at unison or octave pitch
- Mutations (RedHook album), 2024
- Mutations (Beck album), 1998
- Mutations (Fight album), 1994
- Mutations (Vijay Iyer album), 2014
- Mutations EP, 1992 EP by Orbital
- Mutate (album), 1993 album by Battery
- "Mutations", a song by Salt the Wound from their 2009 album, Ares
- Mutation, a 2005 album by Donna Williams
- "Mutations", a song by Nilüfer Yanya from her 2024 album My Method Actor

== Sciences ==
- Mutation (genetic algorithm), an operator in a genetic algorithm of computing
- Mutation (algebra), an operation on algebras producing an algebra with a modified multiplication operation
- Mutation (knot theory), an operation on a knot that creates different knots
- Mutation (Jordan algebra), an operation on Jordan algebras that creates different Jordan algebras
- Mutation of a seed, in the theory of cluster algebras
- Apophony, in linguistics, a change in a sound in a word
- Consonant mutation, in linguistics, a change in a consonant sound
- Affection (linguistics) or vowel mutation, the change in the quality of a vowel under the influence of the following vowel in Celtic languages

== Other ==
- Voice change, the change in human voice during puberty
- Mutation, division and transfer of land ownership in India; see Village accountant

== See also ==
- Mutant (disambiguation)
- Transmutation (disambiguation)
