= Orbital (1991 album) =

- Cover of the CD release

Studio album by Orbital
- Released: 30 September 1991
- Genre: Techno
- Length: 77:48 (CD); 83:51 (LP); 85:58 (Cassette)
- Label: FFRR
- Producer: Orbital

Orbital chronology
Orbital (1991)	Orbital (1993)

Singles from Orbital
- 1. "Chime" Released: December 1989; 2. "Midnight" / "Choice" Released: August 1991

Professional ratings
Review scores
Source	Rating
AllMusic	4/5 stars
Encyclopedia of Popular Music	4/5 stars
NME	8/10
Q	1/5 stars
The Rolling Stone Album Guide	3/5 stars

Orbital (also known as Orbital 1 or the Green Album) is the debut studio album by English electronic music duo Orbital, released on 30 September 1991 by FFRR Records. Orbital self-titled their first two albums so the "Green Album" is an unofficial name to distinguish it from the second album. The Mutations EP refers to the album as L.P. C.D. M.C., thus titling the album after the "LP" / "CD" / "MC" on the front cover of the respective format.

== Background ==
Orbital was formed in the late 80s, and consisted of brothers Phil and Paul Hartnoll. Their first track, "Chime", was released in 1989 to much success, reaching #17 on the UK charts. They were signed to FFRR Records after a bidding war for the track, and the group began to work on their first album.

== Composition ==
The idea of making a full album was inspired by bands like Kraftwerk and Cabaret Voltaire. The album was mainly recorded in the Hartnolls' house, which had been left to them by their parents, although "Macro Head" and "Belfast" were recorded at Gee St. and Marcus Studios, respectively.

The original European release includes live versions of Orbital's first and third single, "Chime" and "Midnight", which had been suggested by FFRR's owner, Pete Tong, to be included on the album, along with "Belfast". "Desert Storm" was recorded all in one day, 17 January 1991, the same day as the launch of Operation Desert Storm, which the track was then named after. "Fahrenheit 303" was named after the Roland TB-303, a bass synthesizer used prominently in the track. The name for "Steel Cube Idolatry" came from a bad review of one of the band's performances while supporting Cabaret Voltaire, which suggested the name as a parody of how "boring" they thought the music was. Paul later said, "We thought, right, we don't even know what any of that means but we are definitely having "Steel Cube Idolatry". That is a brilliant title."

== Artwork and packaging ==
The front cover of the LP release shows a diagram of the heart within the star pattern on the front and in detail on the inner sleeves, while the CD only features the diagram on the inner cover. A similar style of artwork is featured on the second Orbital album, Orbital, colloquially known as "The Brown Album" to distinguish it from this album, which pictures a diagram of the kidneys instead. The cover design is different to identify each format of the release, with the red circle in the centre of the cover on the LP, CD, and cassette versions including the text LP, CD, and MC, respectively. In the case of the CD and LP pressing, the circle also appears on the disc and label, respectively. Vinyl pressings had the track listing on the front cover, rather than on the back.

== American release ==
Orbital was released in 1992 with a different cover and track listing in the United States, incorporating remixes, non-album singles and tracks from Orbital EPs. However, due to the inclusion of tracks not on the original album, the original versions of tracks "Speed Freak", "Macro Head", "Fahrenheit 303", "High Rise", "Untitled" and "I Think it's Disgusting" would not appear on the American release, although "Speed Freak" and "Fahrenheit 303" would appear in a remixed form. "Chime" and "Midnight" do appear, but not in their live versions, instead in the studio versions, although both tracks appear in an edited form. All tracks on the U.S. release had also been remastered using the Bedini Audio Spectral Enhancer (B.A.S.E.).

== 2024 re-release and tour ==
In 2024, Orbital was re-released in an "expanded" edition which featured a remastered edition of the album, along with three bonus discs of music from the era. Alongside this, the band would announce a tour of the album to take place throughout the UK. The album would also be re-released as part of that year's Record Store Day celebrations, appearing in a "splatter" vinyl edition.

== Track listing ==
=== Europe ===
All tracks are written by Orbital.

No.	Title	Length
1.	"The Moebius"	7:01
2.	"Speed Freak"	7:17
3.	"Macro Head" (LP format exclusive)	6:54
4.	"Oolaa"	6:15
5.	"Desert Storm"	12:06
6.	"Fahrenheit 303"	8:26
7.	"Steel Cube Idolatry"	6:34
8.	"High Rise"	8:23
9.	"Untitled" (Later named "Torpedo Town", cassette format exclusive)	9:01
10.	"Chime" (Live)	5:56
11.	"Midnight" (Live)	6:53
12.	"Belfast"	8:06
13.	"I Think it's Disgusting" (Hidden track, CD format exclusive)	0:51
Total length:		93:43

Alternate track listings

Each format (LP, CD and cassette) included a track not included on the others. The hidden track "I Think it's Disgusting" appeared on the CD version only. The double vinyl LP version included a track called "Macro Head", while the cassette included a nine-minute track listed as "Untitled", later named "Torpedo Town" on the 2024 re-release.

=== United States ===
No.	Title	Length
1.	"Belfast"	8:05
2.	"The Moebius"	7:00
3.	"Speed Freak" (Moby Remix)	5:40
4.	"Fahrenheit 3D3"	7:04
5.	"Desert Storm"	12:05
6.	"Oolaa"	6:22
7.	"Chime"	8:01
8.	"Satan"	6:44
9.	"Choice"	5:30
10.	"Midnight"	5:08
11.	"Steel Cube Idolatry" (Cassette format exclusive)	6:29
Total length:		76:34

== Personnel ==
- Paul Hartnoll, Phil Hartnoll – performers
- Orbital – producer
- Tim Hunt – engineer
- Herbert Lesch – assistant engineer
- Fultano '91 – sleeve design

== Use in other media ==
"Belfast" appears on the soundtrack to the film Human Traffic, for which Tong was a musical adviser.
