= Ophiolatry (band) =

Brazilian death metal band

- Origin: Pindamonhangaba, São Paulo, Brazil
- Genre: Death metal
- Years active: 1998–present
- Labels: Mutilation Records; Relapse Records; Evil Vengeance Records; Deathgasm Records; Malignant Art Distribution; Listenable Records; Walk Records; Forces of Satan Records; Regain Records
- Members: Fabio Zperandio; Jhorge "Dog" Duarte; Antonio Cozta
- Website: Official MySpace profile

Ophiolatry is a Brazilian death metal band formed in 1998. The name was derived from a term meaning "the worship of serpents".

== Biography ==
Jhorge "Dog" Duarte, Antonio Cozta, Fabio Zperandio and Tiago Nunes formed Ophiolatry in 1998. They recorded their first demo, Opposite Monarchy, in 1999, and released a split on Mutilation Records with the band Ancestral Malediction. In 2000, Relapse Records included Opposite Monarchy on their compilation album Brazilian Assault, released in Europe and North America. After signing on North American label Evil Vengeance Records, they recorded their first full-length album, Anti-Evangelistic Process, in 2001. This album was mastered by Erik Rutan (Morbid Angel, Hate Eternal) and released in 2002. In 2003, the band did a 50-day tour of Europe after recording the EP Misanchristianthropy. This EP was released in 2003, by US record label Deathgasm Records, as a split with Infernal Dominion. After releasing two more split albums in 2005 and 2006, the band signed to Forces of Satan Records, the Norwegian record label run by Gorgoroth guitarist and founder Infernus. Their latest full-length album, Transmutation, was released in early 2008 through Forces of Satan Records and Regain Records. 2002's Anti-Evangelistic Process was re-released in the summer of that year.

In April 2025, the band announced their third album, Serpent's Verdict, would be released on 5 June.

== Members ==
=== Former ===
- Jhorge "Dog" Duarte - drums (1998–present)
- Jaime Veron - Lead vocals (2021-present)
- Diego Santiago - bass (2021- present )
- Fred Barros - guitar (2021-present)

== Discography ==
=== Albums ===
- Anti-Evangelistic Process (2002)
- Transmutation (2008)
- Serpent's Verdict (2025)

=== Demos ===
- Opposite Monarchy (demo) (1999)

=== Split albums ===
- Opposite Monarchy (with Ancestral Malediction) (1999)
- Misanchristianthropy (with Infernal Dominion) (2004)
- Impaling the Christian Race (with Abhorrence) (2005)
- Satancore (with Sacramental Blood) (2006)

=== Compilation albums ===
- Brazilian Assault (2000)
