= Transmutation (album) =

Studio album by Ophiolatry
- Released: January 21, 2008
- Recorded: October–December 2006
- Studio: Laboratorio6 Studios
- Genre: Death metal
- Length: 31:53
- Label: Regain Records; Forces of Satan Records
- Producer: Ophiolatry

Ophiolatry chronology
| Satancore (split with Sacramental Blood) (2006) | Transmutation (2008) |

Transmutation is the second full-length album of the Brazilian death metal band Ophiolatry. It was released in 2008 by Regain Records and Forces of Satan Records, the label run by Infernus.

== Track listing ==
- All songs written and arranged by Ophiolatry, except where noted.
1. "Parricide" – 01:53
2. "Transmutation" – 02:13
3. "Abyss of Alienation" – 03:15
4. "Divine Stigma" – 01:55
5. "Nominating the Oxen" – 02:02
6. "Cauterization" – 02:05
7. "Urutu" – 01:11
8. "The Ghost" – 01:59
9. "Neuropsychoperverse" – 01:13
10. "Variações 1" – 01:07
11. "Art of War" – 02:00
12. "G.O.D.?" – 00:52
13. "Eradicating the Paradigm" – 02:42
14. "Diabolism" – 01:50
15. "Sub-Race" – 02:23
16. "Prelúdio No 4" – 03:13 (Heitor Villa-Lobos)

== Personnel ==
- Antonio Cozta – vocals, bass
- Fabio Zperandio – acoustic and electric guitars, keyboards, programming
- Jhorge "Dog" Duarte – drums
