= Mutant (2025 film) =

- Theatrical release poster
- Directed by: Constanza Tejo
- Written by: Constanza Tejo
- Produced by: Valentina Roblero
- Starring: Constanza Tejo
- Cinematography: Constanza Tejo
- Edited by: Constanza Tejo
- Music by: Matías Lopez; Rafael Allendes
- Production companies: Heroína Cine; Niebla
- Distributed by: Storyboard Media Distribución
- Release date: January 9, 2025
- Running time: 80 minutes
- Country: Chile
- Language: Spanish

Mutant (Spanish: La mutante) is a 2025 Chilean documentary film written, filmed, edited, starred and directed by Constanza Tejo. It documents the emotions and feelings of the director's pregnancy and the impact it had on her career as a cinematographer.

== Synopsis ==
A cinematographer is sidelined from the workforce by a sudden pregnancy. Away from her craft and trapped at home—and by household chores—she has the foresight to film her metamorphosis into a new way of being a filmmaker and a woman.

== Cast ==
- Constanza Tejo
- Soledad Roa Allende
- Coco Allende Santibáñez
- Romina Tejo Roa
- Catalina Tejo Roa
- Rodolfo Tejo Merino
- Claudio Aránguiz Sepúlveda
- Teo Aránguiz Tejo
- Shenda Román
- Luz Croxatto
- Yashira Zomosa
- Paula Ureta

== Release ==
Mutant premiered on January 9, 2025, in Chilean theaters, then screened on the 28th of the same month at the 17th Chilean Film Festival, and on April 3, 2025, at the 18th Pordenone Docs Fest.

== Accolades ==
Year	Award / Festival	Category	Recipient	Result	Ref.
2025	18th Pordenone Docs Fest	Premio della Critica SNCCI	Mutant	Won	
2025	18th Pordenone Docs Fest	Young Audience Award	Mutant	Won	
