= John Dahlbäck =

- Also known as: Hug, Huggotron, Jetboy of Beckster, Kaliber
- Born: October 13, 1985 (age 40); Stockholm, Sweden
- Genres: House; tech house; progressive house; electro house; future house
- Years active: 2002–present
- Labels: Pickadoll Records; Mutants Records; Dim Mak Records; Armada Music; Toolroom; Spinnin'
- Website: www.johndahlback.com

John Dahlbäck (Swedish pronunciation: [ˈjɔnː ˈdɑ̌ːlbɛk]; born October 13, 1985) is a Swedish house music producer and DJ. He has released five albums and uses a variety of stage names. He has also collaborated with his cousin Jesper Dahlbäck in duo musical projects under the name Hugg & Pepp and Pepp & Kaliber.

== Musical career ==
Dahlbäck is also the owner of Pickadoll Records as well as Mutants Records, with releases by, apart from his own work, artists like Sébastien Léger and Dada Life on Pickadoll, and Lunde Bros, Albin Myers and others on Mutants. He has recorded minimal techno under the alias Hug and as Hugg&Pepp together with his cousin and fellow producer Jesper Dahlbäck. Remixes include Kleerup's "Longing for Lullabies" and Alanis Morissette's "Underneath".

He made an appearance with a set on Pete Tong's The Essential Mix on BBC Radio 1 on 4 October 2008.

Dahlbäck's first artist album Mutants was released in May 2010 and had various releases on labels such as Dim Mak, Spinnin', Big Beat, Mix Mash, Tool Room and Ultra Records.

== Discography ==
=== Albums ===
==== Studio albums ====
- 2005: Shades of Shadow
- 2005: Man From the Fall
- 2006: At The Gun Show
- 2008: Winners & Fools
- 2010: Mutants
- 2012: Kill The Silence (as Demure) [As free download]
- 2016: Saga
- 2018: Find a Home
- 2022: To the Sky

==== Compilation albums ====
- 2005: Warsteiner Club World Club And Lounge Volume 1
- 2007: Pickadoll's
- 2007: Mar T, Les Schmitz, John Dahlback: Amnesia Ibiza The Best Global Club
- 2009: Clubbers Guide Ibiza '09
- 2009: Greatest Hug's
- 2010: Mutants
- 2012: Toolroom Knights (Mixed by John Dahlbäck)

=== Extended plays ===
==== As lead artist ====
Title	Details
Panic	Release date: October 1, 2012; Label: Rising Music
The Trip	Release date: November 6, 2012; Labels: +Mas Label / Empo
Uh Oh!	Release date: October 22, 2013; Label: Dim Mak Records
The Acoustics	Release date: August 22, 2016; Acoustic singles by the album "Saga"; Label: Armada Music B.V
Color In My Heart	Release date: June 23, 2017; Label: Armada Music B.V

==== As MyBack (with Albin Myers) ====
Title	Details
Blomman	Release date: July 12, 2011; Label: Dim Mak Records

=== Singles ===
==== As lead artist ====
Year	Single	Peak positions				Album
Year	Single	US Dance	BEL (Vl)	NED	SPN	Album
2004	"Wait For Love"	–	–	–		Non-album singles
2005	"Falling In Love" (with Andy P)	–	–	–		Non-album singles
2005	"Better Without You"	–	–	–		Non-album singles
2005	"Nothing Is For Real" (featuring Erika Gellenmark)	–	–	–		Non-album singles
2006	"Late Night Worries" (featuring Andy P)	–	–	–		Non-album singles
2006	"Power 1"	–	–	–		Non-album singles
2006	"The Call" (featuring Yota)	–	–	–		Non-album singles
2007	"Blink"	–	14 (Ultratop)	–	–	Non-album singles
2007	"Everywhere" (with Andy P)	–	–	–	–	Non-album singles
2008	"Pyramid"	–	33 (Ultratop)	26	–	Non-album singles
2009	"Out There" (featuring Basto!)	–	6 (Ultratip)	–	–	Non-album singles
2009	"Do You Remember"	–	–	–	–	Non-album singles
2009	"Autumn"	–	11 (Ultratip)	–	–	Non-album singles
2010	"Grunge"	–	–	–	–	Non-album singles
2010	"Bingo" (featuring Elodie)	–	–	–	–	Non-album singles
2010	"Kairo"	–	–	–	–	Non-album singles
2010	"Light Of Day" (with Albin Myers)	–	–	–	–	Non-album singles
2010	"Back To The Dancefloor"	–	–	–	–	Non-album singles
2010	"Turn Down The Lights" (featuring Andy P)	–	–	–	–	Non-album singles
2011	"Is This For Love" (credited as Kaliber featuring Elodie)	–	–	–	20	Mutants
2011	"Come Undone" (with Tommy Trash and Sam Obernik)	–	–	–	–	Non-album singles
2011	"Are You Nervous"	–	–	–	–	Non-album singles
2011	"Senses" (with Henrik B)	–	–	–	–	Non-album singles
2011	"Overdose"	–	–	–	–	Non-album singles
2011	"Phoenix"	–	–	–	–	Non-album singles
2012	"Sing That"	–	–	–	–	Non-album singles
2012	"Soldier"	–	–	–	–	Non-album singles
2012	"Life"	–	–	–	–	Non-album singles
2012	"Start Lovin' You"	–	99 (Ultratip)	–	–	Non-album singles
2012	"Take This Thing Back"	–	–	–	–	Non-album singles
2012	"Living a Lie" (featuring lossa)	–	–	–	–	Non-album singles
2012	"Embrace Me" (featuring Urban Cone and Lucas Nord)	–	–	–	–	Non-album singles
2012	"Zeus"	–	–	–	–	Non-album singles
2012	"Comet"	–	–	–	–	Non-album singles
2012	"Every Breath" (with Greg Cerrone featuring Janice Robinson)	–	–	–	–	Non-album singles
2012	"Get Wild"	–	–	–	–	Non-album singles
2012	"Don't Be Silent" (John Dahlbäck vs. Ron Carroll)	–	–	–	–	Non-album singles
2013	"Life (Diamonds in the Dark)" (featuring Agnes)	–	–	–	–	Non-album singles
2013	"Nuke"	–	–	–	–	Non-album singles
2013	"We Were Gods" (featuring Urban Cone and Lucas Nord)	–	–	–	–	Non-album singles
2014	"Sirens"	–	–	–	–	Non-album singles
2014	"Blink Again" (with Benny Benassi)	–	–	–	–	Non-album singles
2014	"Honors" (featuring Rebecca & Fiona)	–	–	–	–	Non-album singles
2014	"You Can Touch"	–	–	–	–	Non-album singles
2014	"Heartbeat" (featuring Little Boots)	–	–	–	–	Non-album singles
2014	"A Little More" (with Kaskade featuring Sansa)	35	–	–	–	Automatic
2015	"Never Let You Go" (with Dash Berlin featuring Bullysongs)	–	–	–	–	We Are (Part 1)
2015	"Shooting Star" (featuring Olivera)	–	–	–	–	Non-album singles
2015	"Lord" (with Albin Myers)	–	–	–	–	Non-album singles
2015	"Raven"	–	–	–	–	Saga
2015	"Atlantis"	–	–	–	–	Saga
2015	"Count To Ten" (featuring Alexx Mack)	–	–	–	–	Saga
2016	"Where You Are" (featuring Lovestarrs)	–	–	–	–	Saga
2016	"Ain't You"	–	–	–	–	Saga
2016	"New York City" (featuring Luke McMaster)	–	–	–	–	Saga
2016	"Gargamel"	–	–	–	–	Saga
2016	"Walking With Shadows" (featuring Bullysongs)	–	–	–	–	Saga
2016	"Bapalapa"	–	–	–	–	Non-album singles
2016	"Won't Back Away" (featuring Nick & Simon)	–	–	–	–	Non-album singles
2016	"Candy"	–	–	–	–	Non-album singles
2017	"Catch Me If You Can" (featuring Melanie Fontana)	–	–	–	–	Color In My Heart EP
2017	"Diva"	–	–	–	–	Color In My Heart EP
2017	"Anyone Would Know" (featuring Davis Mallory)	–	–	–	–	Color In My Heart EP
2018	"Find A Home"	–	–	–	–	Non-album singles
2018	"Back To Me" (featuring Trove)	–	–	–	–	Non-album singles
2018	"Deep Inside"	–	–	–	–	Non-album singles
2018	"Bricks"	–	–	–	–	Non-album singles
2018	"Never Be Enough" (featuring Melanie Fontana)	–	–	–	–	Non-album singles
2018	"Lost Memories"	–	–	–	–	Non-album singles
2018	"Voyager"	–	–	–	–	Non-album singles
2019	"Foundation"	–	–	–	–	Non-album singles
2019	"I Want Your Love"	–	–	–	–	Non-album singles
2019	"Chants" (with Benjin)	–	–	–	–	Non-album singles
2020	"Travessia" (with David Vrong)	–	–	–	–	Non-album singles
2020	"The Law" (with David Vrong)	–	–	–	–	Non-album singles
2020	"Chased"	–	–	–	–	Non-album singles
2021	"Nothing But the Truth"	–	–	–	–	Non-album singles
2021	"Back Around" (with Benjin)	–	–	–	–	Non-album singles
2021	"Another Morning"	–	–	–	–	Non-album singles
2023	"In The End" (with CLMD)					
"—" denotes a recording that did not chart or was not released.

==== As MyBack (with Albin Myers) ====
Title	Year	Album
"Trigger"	2010	Non-album singles
"Breaking Your Locks [MyBack Original]" (featuring Olivera)^{1}	2015	Non-album singles
"VIBE"^{2} (with I.L.Y)^{1}	2015	Non-album singles

Notes

- Note 1: Credited with the individual names Dählback and Myers
- Note 2: Named "Original Summerburst Anthem 2015"

==== As Jovicii (with Avicii) ====
Title	Year	Album
"Don't Hold Back" (featuring Andy P)	2010	Non-album singles

== Music videos ==
=== As lead artist ===
List of music videos as lead artist, showing year released and labels
Title	Year	Label(s)
"Life (Diamonds In The Dark)" (featuring Agnes)	2013	Big Beat Records / Mutants Records
"We Were Gods" (featuring Urban Cone and Lucas Nord)	2013	Ultra Records
"Never Let You Go" (with Dash Berlin featuring Bullysongs)	2015	Armada Music
"Raven"	2015	Armada Music
"Atlantis"	2015	Armada Music
"Count To Ten" (featuring Alexx Mack)	2015	Armada Music
"New York City" (featuring Luke McMaster)	2016	Armada Music
"Walking With Shadows" (featuring Bullysongs)	2016	Armada Music
"Won't Back Away" (featuring Nick & Simon)	2016	Armada Music

=== As MyBack (with Albin Myers) ===
Title	Year	Label(s)
"Breaking Your Locks" (with Albin Myers & Olivera)	2015	Mutants Records
