= Mutations EP =

Mutations

EP by Orbital
- Released: 3 February 1992
- Genre: Progressive house; breakbeat hardcore; techno
- Label: FFRR
- Producer: P&P Hartnoll

Orbital EP chronology
III (1991)	Mutations (1992)	Radiccio EP (1992)

Mutations, subtitled "From L.P. C.D. M.C.", is an EP by English electronic music duo Orbital. Selected artists picked an Orbital track, all from the 1991 Green Album, to remix. Orbital themselves contributed two remixes to this EP.

The EP was released on vinyl in two parts, and as one CD or MC.

All remixes were remastered and included on the re-release of the green album in 2024.

== Remixers ==
Remixer	Title	Vinyl 1	Vinyl 2	CD/MC
Joey Beltram	"Chime"		⬤	
Joey Beltram	"Oolaa"	⬤		⬤
Moby	"Speed Freak"	⬤		⬤
Ray Keith	"Chime"	⬤		
Meat Beat Manifesto	"Oolaa"	⬤		
Dave Angel and Dave Dorrell	"Steel Cube Idolatory"		⬤	
Orbital	"Fahrenheit 3D3"		⬤	⬤
Orbital	"Chime Crime"		⬤	⬤

== Artwork ==
The sleeves for the two 12" vinyls were designed by Gavin Fulton (Fultano 92). Part 1 (FX 181) features an orange Orbital "loopz" logo on a beige background and part 2 (FXR 181) is reversed.

== Samples ==
"Chime Crime" samples "Material Girl" by Madonna.
"Chime (Ray Keith Mutation)" samples "Daydreaming" by Baby D.
"Oolaa (Meat Beat Manifesto Mutation)" samples "Go Now" by Was (Not Was)

== Charts ==
Chart (1992)	Peak position
UK Singles (OCC)	24
UK Dance (Music Week)	4
UK Club Chart (Music Week)	59
