= Mutants (John Dahlbäck album) =

Studio album by John Dahlbäck
- Released: May 2010
- Genre: House, electro house, progressive house, electro
- Length: 106:10
- Label: Pickadoll Records

Mutants is the debut album from the Swedish house artist, producer, remixer and DJ, John Dahlbäck. Mutants features tracks from previous years of Dahlbäck's music career, as well as recent chart-topping hits. The album was officially released as a digital download on iTunes and Beatport in May 2010.

== Track listing ==
1. "Borderline" - 6:37
2. "Hustle Up" - 6:30
3. "Is This For Love?" - Original Club Mix (Kaliber featuring Elodie) - 6:51
4. "Don't Speak" - 5:40
5. "Lick My Deck" (with Sebastian Ingrosso) - 8:04
6. "Gasoline" (by Huggotron) - 5:12
7. "Love Inside" - Dub Mix (featuring Andy P) - 6:53
8. "If You Give Me" - 6:18
9. "Nothing Is For Real" - Mark Knight Remix (featuring Erika Gellermark) - 7:26
10. "Autumn" - Extended Mix - 7:22
11. "Everywhere" (featuring Andy P) - 5:29
12. "Blink" - 6:19
13. "Bingo" - Extended Original Mix (featuring Elodie) - 6:49
14. "Pyramid" - Dirty South Remix - 7:39
15. "Human Animal" - John Dahlbäck Remix (by Young Rebels & Francesco Diaz) - 6:44
16. "Out There" (featuring Basto!) - 6:24

== Production ==
Mutants consists of many tracks which have been released by Dahlbäck over the past few years. Borderline, Hustle Up, Love Inside, Autumn, Everywhere, Blink, Out There, Bingo and Pyramid were all released as singles over time.

== Reception ==
The album was generally well received and obtained fairly positive reviews both critically and from the general public.
