= Kurd Maverick =

Cihan Ötün (Turkish pronunciation: [dʒiˈhan øtyn]), known as Kurd Maverick, is a Kurdish-born German house record producer and DJ.

== Biography ==
He is of Kurdish origin.

== Discography ==
=== Singles ===
- 2006: The Rub (I Never Rock)
- 2006: Love Sensation 2006 (with Eddie Thoneick)
- 2007: Let's Work
- 2007: String of Tortuga
- 2007: Rise! (mit Tapesh feat. Terri B!)
- 2008: Let the Freak Out! (with Azin)
- 2008: (All Over) The World
- 2009: Love Emergency (with Sam Obernik)
- 2009: Blue Monday
- 2009: Ring Ring Ring (with Rud)
- 2010: Shine a Light
- 2011: N.Y.C (with Terri B! aka Terri Bjerre)
- 2012: Hell Yeah
- 2019: Lonely (with Eddie Thonekick featuring Errol Reid)
- 2025: PYHU (Put Your Hands Up) (with Hugel)

=== Remixes (selection) ===
- 2005: D.O.N.S. feat. Technotronic - Pump Up the Jam
- 2006: Basement Jaxx - Take Me Back To Your House
- 2006: Soul Avengerz feat. Javine - Don't Let The Morning Come
- 2006: Full Intention - Soul Power
- 2006: Robbie Williams - Lovelight
- 2006: Chic Flowerz vs. Muriel Fowler - Gypsy Woman
- 2006: Sonique - Tonight
- 2006: John Dahlbäck - Nothing Is For Real
- 2007: Bob Sinclar - Everybody Movin'
- 2007: Tim Deluxe feat. Simon Franks - Let The Beats Roll
- 2008: Rosenstolz - Wie Weit Ist Vorbei
- 2008: Eddie Thoneick - I Wanna Freak U
- 2009: Pet Shop Boys - Love Etc.
- 2010: Boy George - Amazing Grace
- 2010: Alex Gaudino - I'm In Love (I Wanna Do It)
- 2010: Eddie Thoneick feat. Andy P. - Love Under Pressure
