= Hannah Gill and The Hours =

American band

- Origin: United States
- Genres: Pop, pop rock, blues, soul
- Members: Hannah Gill; Brad Hammonds
- Website: hannahgillandthehours.com

Hannah Gill and The Hours is an American pop, pop rock, blues and soul band fronted by singer Hannah Gill. Hannah Gill is a jazz musician who has collaborated with Postmodern Jukebox and rose to fame after the collaboration.

The band's debut album, The Water, was released in 2016, when Gill was just 18 years old.
