= Blue Sunshine =

Blue Sunshine may refer to:

- Blue Sunshine (album), the only album release by British group The Glove
- Blue Sunshine (film), a 1978 horror film
- "Blue Sunshine", a song by Blue October, from the album The Answers
- "Blue Sunshine", a song by B'z, from the album Green
- Blue Sunshine, a song by The Meteors, from the album Wreckin' Crew
