= Loved (Cranes album) =

Studio album by Cranes
- Released: 12 September 1994
- Genre: Dream pop
- Length: 43:05
- Label: Dedicated
- Producer: Cranes

Cranes chronology
Forever (1993)	Loved (1994)	La Tragédie d'Oreste et Électre (1996)

Singles from Loved
- 1. "Shining Road" Released: 22 August 1994

Loved is the third studio album by English rock band Cranes. It was released on 12 September 1994 by Dedicated Records.

== Critical reception ==
Professional ratings
Review scores
Source	Rating
AllMusic	4/5 stars
Christgau's Consumer Guide	(neither)
Entertainment Weekly	B+
The Guardian	3/4 stars
NME	6/10
Q	4/5 stars

Greg Fasolino of Trouser Press said: "'Shining Road' has an enchanting pop melody and rushing guitar pulse, 'Lilies' flirts with fragile funkiness and 'Paris and Rome' feels like a European music-box waltz. Using odd squeaking noises and distant whammy-bar twangs, 'Beautiful Friend' cunningly fashions an unusual ambient/Western hybrid; the title track actually rocks." Cranes' entry in the 1995 Guinness Encyclopedia of Popular Music notes that while Alison Shaw's vocals are "noticeably more prominent in the mix" on Loved than on earlier Cranes recordings, the band's music remains rooted in dream pop. Writing in The Rough Guide to Rock, Ian Canadine found Loved to be "very similar in tone" to Cranes' previous album Forever (1993), as well as "somehow too comfortable, though containing some echoes of the clang of old on 'Reverie'."

== Track listing ==
All tracks are written by Alison Shaw and Jim Shaw.

1. "Shining Road" – 3:50
2. "Pale Blue Sky" – 3:29
3. "Rêverie" – 4:00
4. "Lilies" – 3:44
5. "Are You Gone?" – 2:56
6. "Loved" – 3:09
7. "Beautiful Friend" – 3:12
8. "Bewildered" – 4:21
9. "Come This Far" – 4:09
10. "Paris and Rome" – 6:03
11. "In the Night" (exclusive to CD edition) – 4:12

US edition bonus tracks

12. "Shining Road" (Brauer mix) – 3:53
13. "Paris and Rome" (Flood mix) – 5:17
14. "Lilies" (Flood mix) – 3:54

== Personnel ==
Credits are adapted from the album's liner notes.

Production

- Cranes – production, engineering
- Giles Hall – assistance
- Tony Jones – assistance
- Neil Simons – assistance

Design

- Blue Source – sleeve design
- Edgar Degas – front cover artwork (Blue Dancers)

== Charts ==
Chart (1994)	Peak position
UK Independent Albums (OCC)	5
