= Robert Smith (musician) =

English rock musician (born 1959)

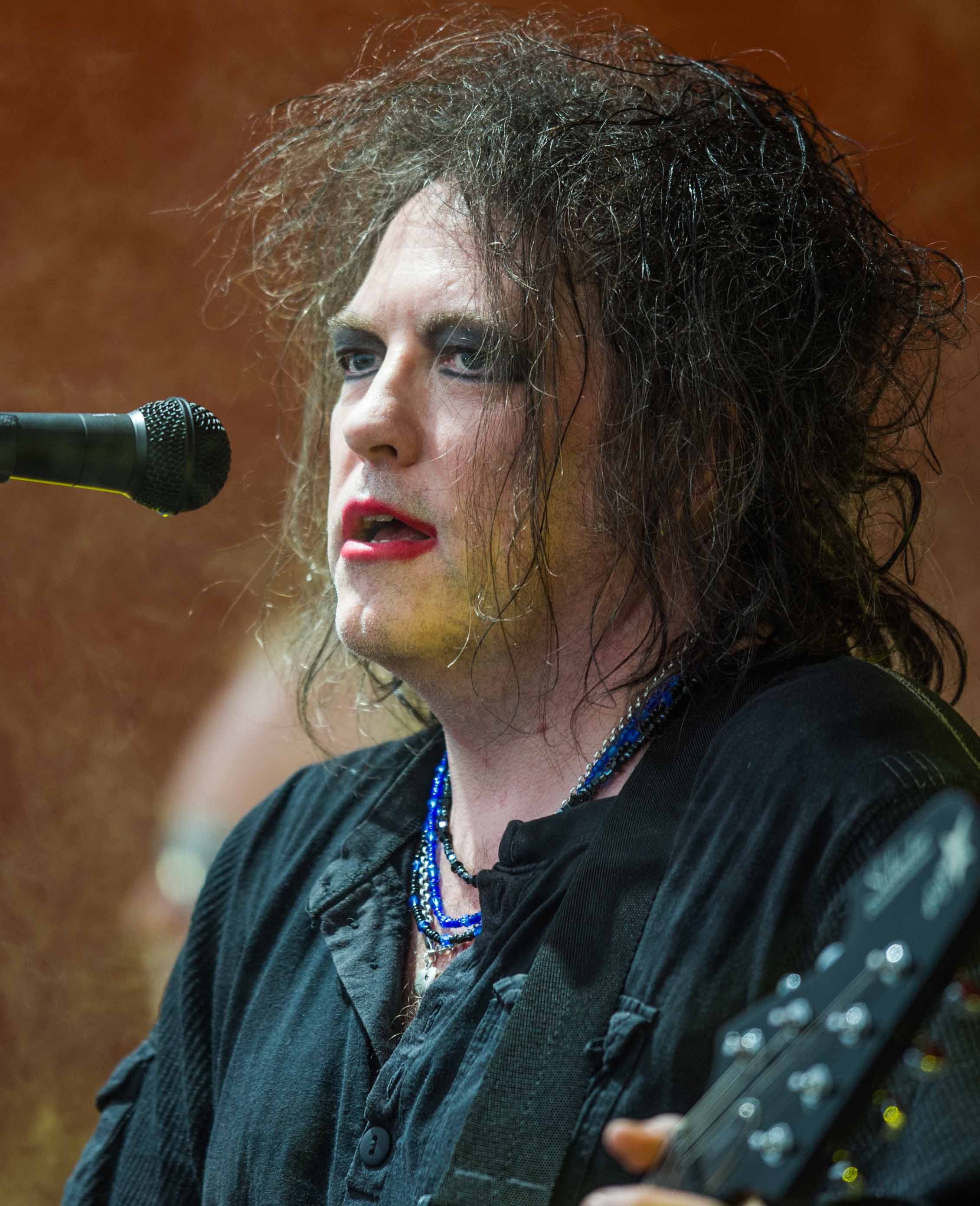
- Smith in 2012

Background information
- Born: Robert James Smith; 21 April 1959 (age 67); Blackpool, England
- Origin: Crawley, England
- Genres: Post-punk; gothic rock; alternative rock; new wave
- Occupations: Musician; singer; songwriter; record producer
- Instruments: Vocals; guitar; keyboards; bass
- Years active: 1972–present
- Member of: The Cure
- Formerly of: Siouxsie and the Banshees; the Glove
- Spouse: Mary Theresa Poole (m. 1988)
- Website: thecure.com

Robert James Smith (born 21 April 1959) is an English musician who is the co-founder, lead vocalist, guitarist, primary songwriter, and only continuous member of the Cure, a post-punk band formed in 1976. His guitar-playing style (including his use of the Fender Bass VI), and distinctive singing voice shaped the sounding identity of the Cure. His fashion sense (often sporting a pale complexion, smeared red lipstick, black eye-liner, unkempt wiry black hair and all-black clothes) were highly influential on the goth subculture that rose to prominence in the 1980s.

Smith's other work includes playing the lead guitar as a member of Siouxsie and the Banshees from 1982 to 1984 and being the co-founder of the short-lived band the Glove in 1983. He was inducted into the Rock and Roll Hall of Fame as a member of the Cure in 2019, and Rolling Stone magazine ranked him as the 157th greatest singer of all time in 2023.

== Early life ==
Robert James Smith was born in Blackpool on 21 April 1959, the third of four children of Rita Mary (née Emmott) and James Alexander Smith. He came from a musical family, as his father sang and his mother played the piano. Raised as a Catholic, he later became an atheist. When he was three years old, his family moved to Horley, where he attended St Francis' Primary School. When he was six, his family moved to Crawley, where he attended St. Francis' Junior School. He later attended Notre Dame Middle School from 1970 to 1972, and St Wilfrid's Comprehensive School from 1972 to 1977. He and his younger sister Janet received piano lessons as children. He later quipped, "[Janet] was a piano prodigy, so sibling rivalry made me take up guitar because she couldn't get her fingers around the neck." He told Smash Hits that in 1966, when he turned seven years old, his older brother Richard taught him "a few basic chords" on guitar.

Smith began taking classical guitar lessons from the age of nine with a student of guitarist John Williams, whom he called a "really excellent guitarist". He said, "I learned a lot, but got to the point where I was losing the sense of fun. I wish I'd stuck with it." He has said his guitar tutor was "horrified" by his playing. He gave up formal tuition and began teaching himself to play by ear, listening to his older brother's record collection. He was 13 or 14 when he became more serious about rock music and "started to play and learn frenetically". Up until December 1972, he did not have a guitar of his own and had been borrowing his brother's, so his brother gave him the guitar for Christmas. Smith said of this gift, "I'd commandeered it anyway—so whether he was officially giving it to me at Christmas or not, I was going to have it!" Rock biographer Jeff Apter maintains that the guitar Smith received for Christmas of 1972 was from his parents, and equates this item with Smith's Woolworths "Top 20" guitar that was later used on many of the Cure's earliest recordings. Smith has given differing accounts of the instrument’s origin, at times stating in interviews that he purchased the guitar himself for £20 in 1978.

Smith described Notre Dame Middle School as "a very free-thinking establishment" with an experimental approach, a freedom he claims to have abused. On one occasion, he said that he wore a black velvet dress to school and kept it on all day: "The teachers just thought, 'Oh, it's a phase he's going through, he's got some personality crisis, let's help him through it.'" He said "four other kids" beat him up after school, although Apter notes that Smith has given several conflicting versions of the story. Apter also reports that Smith put in just enough effort at Notre Dame to pass tests, and quotes Smith as saying, "If you were crafty enough, you could convince the teachers you were special; I did virtually nothing for three years." St Wilfrid's was reportedly stricter than Notre Dame. In the summer of 1975, Smith and his school bandmates took their O Levels, but only he and Michael Dempsey stayed on to attend sixth form at St Wilfrid's from 1976 to 1977.

Smith has said that he was expelled from St Wilfrid's as an "undesirable influence" after his band Malice's second live performance shortly before Christmas in 1976, which took place at the school and allegedly caused a riot: "I got taken back [in 1977] but they never acknowledged that I was there [...] I did three A levels—failed biology miserably, scraped through French, and got a 'B' in English. Then I spent eight or nine months on social security until they stopped my money, so I thought, 'Now's the time to make a demo and see what people think.'" According to Cure biographers Dave Bowler and Bryan Dray, the school expelled ex-Malice co-founder Marc Ceccagno along with Smith, whose new band Amulet played the December school show. Smith has given conflicting accounts of his alleged expulsion, elsewhere saying that he was merely suspended and that it was because he did not get along with the school headmaster, and on another occasion saying he was suspended because his "attitude towards religion was considered wrong".

== Music career ==
=== School bands: 1972–1976 ===
Smith has said that his first band when he was 14 consisted of himself, his brother Richard, their younger sister Janet, and some of Richard's friends. He remarked, "It was called the Crawley Goat Band – brilliant!" However, while the Crawley Goat Band may have been Smith's first regular group, he would have been just 13 when he and his Notre Dame schoolmates gave their first one-off performance together as the Obelisk, an early incarnation of what would eventually become the Cure. The Obelisk featured Smith (still playing piano at this point) alongside Marc Ceccagno (lead guitar), Michael Dempsey (guitar), Alan Hill (bass), and Laurence "Lol" Tolhurst (percussion) and, according to the Cure's official biography Ten Imaginary Years, gave their only performance at a school function in April 1972. Jeff Apter, however, dates the performance to April 1973, which is at variance with Smith and his bandmates having already left Notre Dame Middle School by this time.

During the latter part of 1972, the nucleus of Smith, Ceccagno, Dempsey and Tolhurst had gone on to secondary school together at St Wilfrid's Comprehensive, where they and their friends continued playing music together. Smith said that they were known simply as "The Group" "because it was the only one at school so we didn't need a name." Dempsey, who eventually moved from guitar to bassist for the Group, said that another name they toyed with was the Brat's Club – a reference to Evelyn Waugh's A Handful of Dust. Smith said that "the group" eventually became Malice, "sort of a sub-metal punk group -with Michael Dempsey, Laurence and two other blokes." According to the band's Ten Imaginary Years biography, between January and December 1976, the shifting line-up for Malice featured several "other blokes", with founding guitarist Marc Ceccagno being replaced by Pearl Thompson, an early drummer known only as "Graham" replaced by Lol Tolhurst, and "Graham's brother" replaced by vocalist Martin Creasy. By 1977, Malice had become Easy Cure.

=== The Cure: 1976–present ===
==== As singer and frontman ====
Smith did not intend to become the lead vocalist of the Cure. Bowler and Dray note that the Obelisk had "featured Dempsey and Ceccagno as guitarists and him [Robert] on piano as very much a background player." As the Group gradually became Malice and began regular rehearsals in January 1976, Smith was still one of several floating members. Of their first "proper" rehearsal at St Edwards Church, Smith said:

I think it all came about because Marc Ceccagno wanted to be a guitar hero. Michael had a bass, I had got hold of a guitar and our first drummer, Graham, had a drum kit. His brother had an amp and a mic, so he sang.

By December 1976, Graham's brother had been replaced by vocalist Martin Creasy, a journalist with The Crawley Observer, whose brief tenure with the group was a live débâcle according to those involved. By January 1977 Malice had changed their name to Easy Cure, partly to distance themselves from these earlier shows. Both drummer Lol Tolhurst and bassist Mick Dempsey are also noted as having performed vocals with the group in the early years. Tolhurst also sang on a cover of "Wild Thing" at Malice's early shows, and Dempsey sang backing vocals on songs like "Killing An Arab", and even recorded lead vocals on one track on the Cure's debut album, their cover of Hendrix's "Foxy Lady". During March 1977, a vocalist named Gary X came and went, and was replaced by Peter O'Toole, described as "a demon footballer and Bowie fan" who made his singing debut in April. O'Toole remained Easy Cure's steady front man for several months while the group played the local pub circuit, "building up an enormous local following", and was even the singer on the home demo tapes that landed them their first recording contract with Hansa Records.

However, by the time Easy Cure entered London's Sound And Vision Studio to record for Hansa in October 1977, O'Toole had left to work on a Kibbutz in Israel. Smith then fell into the vocalist role by default, since no better replacement appeared. He told Musician magazine in 1989:

When we started, and were playing in pubs, I wasn't the singer ... I was the drunk rhythm guitarist who wrote all these weird songs. We went through about five different singers – they were fucking useless, basically. I always ended up thinking, 'I could do better than this.' ... I mean, I hated my voice, but I didn't hate it more than I hated everyone else's voice ... So I thought, 'If I can get away with that, I can be the singer.' I've worked on that basis ever since.

On 14 October 2024, Smith announced that he plans on retiring in 2029. "I’m 70 in 2029, and that’s the 50th anniversary of the first Cure album [Three Imaginary Boys]. If I make it that far, that’s it. In the intervening time, I’d like to include playing concerts as part of the overall plan of what we’re going to do. I’ve loved it; the last 10 years of playing shows have been the best 10 years of being in the band. It pisses all over the other 30-odd years! It’s been great" Smith said.

==== As principal songwriter ====
Smith was also not the sole songwriter or lyricist in the group during their early years; the band name Easy Cure came from a song penned by Lol Tolhurst, while Grinding Halt began as a Tolhurst lyric that Smith shortened to the first half of each line. (Note: The Easy Cure "group home demo" of "Grinding Halt" from March 1978, with Tolhurst's longer original lyric, was later released on Deluxe Edition (2004) of Three Imaginary Boys.) Easy Cure condensed its name to the Cure shortly afterwards. During 1978–79, Smith composed and recorded demo versions of some of the Cure's definitive early songs on his sister Janet's Hammond organ with a built-in tape recorder, including "10:15 Saturday Night". (Note: "Robert Smith home demo" version of "10:15 Saturday Night", recorded in February 1978, appears on the 2004 Deluxe Edition of Three Imaginary Boys.)

By the time the NME interviewed the band in October 1979 during their tour with Siouxsie and the Banshees, Smith was acknowledged as the principal writer of "almost all of the Cure's songs and lyrics", and stated that he was uncomfortable playing and singing songs that were not his own. Following his return from the Banshees' tour, Smith also composed most of the music for the album Seventeen Seconds using the Hammond, a drum machine and his trademark Top 20 Woolworth's guitar, during a home demo session in his parents' basement. Most of the lyrics had been written in one night in Newcastle. (Note: Some of the new songs, however, had been debuted live while on the Banshees tour.(Thompson, Dave & Jo-Ann Greene, The Cure – A Visual Documentary, (1988), Omnibus Press, p. 18; ISBN 0-7119-1387-0)) Michael Dempsey, discussing his own departure from the group at this time, later remarked:

Robert's new songs were more of a personal statement – entirely personal to him – and I couldn't make that statement on his behalf.

Although Smith wrote most of the lyrics for Seventeen Seconds, many were also rewritten by the group during the recording of the album itself. Dempsey's replacement Simon Gallup described the collective writing process to Sounds in 1980:

When we play new songs live Robert ad libs [vocals] a lot until he gets the feel of it. Then when we record it if it's still not right it means everyone sitting around Chris Parry's (their manager's) kitchen all night scrawling sheets and sheets of paper – for "At Night" we got really desperate and finished up at six in the morning with Lol standing on the table pressing his head against the ceiling because he thought that might help.

Lol Tolhurst later stated that he, Gallup and Smith all wrote lyrics for the Cure's early albums, and that the group dynamic only changed after their 1982 album Pornography:

Generally as Robert had to sing the words he chose which ones he sang but they were from all of us. He kept a big box of words to which I contributed from time to time (Simon too) and he would use them all for songs.

Tolhurst claimed to have written the lyrics for "All Cats Are Grey" from the 1981 album Faith, which he later re-recorded with his own project, Levinhurst. In contrast to Tolhurst's recollection of their songwriting as a group effort until after Pornography, in 1982 Smith claimed to have written "90 per cent of the Pornography album", and that he therefore could not leave the Cure, because it would not be the Cure without him.

For their first four albums (Three Imaginary Boys, Seventeen Seconds, Faith and Pornography), all members of the group had received equal songwriting credits. With Simon Gallup's departure reducing the group to a duo, and Tolhurst quitting drums to start taking keyboard lessons, from July 1982 until Gallup's return in February 1985, according to Smith, much of the writing and recording process within the Cure effectively became a solo effort. Nonetheless, Tolhurst was credited as co-writer of five of the eight songs featured on 1983's singles and b-sides collection Japanese Whispers (including "Let's Go to Bed" and "The Walk"), while "The Love Cats", "Lament" and "The Dream" were credited to Smith only. Of 1984's The Top, Smith would say it was "the solo album I never made", having played nearly all instruments himself except for drums (by Andy Anderson), with Porl Thompson contributing saxophone to one song ("Give Me It"), and Tolhurst contributing keyboards to 3 of the album's 10 songs.

In 1985, the band had success with The Head on the Door, with Smith as the sole songwriter. The line-up also included Gallup, Tolhurst, Thompson and Boris Williams. In 1987, the double album Kiss Me, Kiss Me, Kiss Me, with singles "Just Like Heaven" and "Hot, Hot, Hot!" was released to increasing popularity for the band in the US. From that time and on subsequent records, the writing was made by the whole band but still with Smith as the main composer and arranger.

=== Siouxsie and the Banshees, the Glove, and collaborations ===
==== Smith, Severin, and Siouxsie on tour: 1979 ====
Robert Smith met Steven Severin of Siouxsie and the Banshees at a Throbbing Gristle and Cabaret Voltaire gig at the London YMCA on 3 August 1979. Both the Banshees and the Cure had been signed to Polydor and its imprint Fiction, respectively, by Chris Parry, and Smith was already a fan of the Banshees. The pair hit it off, and Severin invited Smith to accompany the Banshees on a UK tour in support of their second album Join Hands. The two bands embarked on the tour later in August, and meanwhile in September Banshees singer Siouxsie Sioux contributed backing vocals to "I'm Cold", the B-side to the Cure's next single "Jumping Someone Else's Train" (released in November), A few dates into the Join Hands tour, however, Banshees' guitarist John McKay and drummer Kenny Morris quit the band hours before they were due to go on stage in Aberdeen, placing the tour in limbo. Determined not to let the tour end, Smith volunteered to replace McKay temporarily on condition that the Cure remained the opening act, while ex-Slits drummer Budgie joined on drums. The tour resumed on 18 September, with Smith playing in both bands each night. At the tour's end, Smith returned full-time to the Cure.

Severin has attributed Smith's transition from a reticent figure to a more enigmatic front person to Smith's early experiences playing with Siouxsie and the Banshees:

I think he learnt how to be a front person, just by standing next to Siouxsie for a couple of months every night. I think he completely changed his persona on stage because of that; he came out of his shell. I think that he learnt how to be a bit more flamboyant, and how it was okay, and I think he saw how, y'know... how should I put it... Siouxsie's more "diva" moments were kind of acceptable because they were the front person, and I think he learnt how to get away with stuff. And just a bit about stagecraft, and how to use the audience a bit more. Because if you look at early clips of their performances you can see he's sort of much more shy and retiring than he becomes a bit later on, and of course, his whole look changes as well.

==== Cult Hero and Dance Fools Dance label: 1979–1980 ====
Smith meanwhile conceived the Cult Hero side-project to collaborate with bassist Simon Gallup of the Magspies, recorded at Morgan Studios in October 1979. With some leftover time in the studio from the Cult Hero sessions, Smith also produced recordings by the Magspies and a young vocal and percussion duo the Obtainers (described by Steve Sutherland of Melody Maker as "two 11-year olds banging on pots and pans"), for the fledgling independent label Dance Fools Dance co-founded by Robert Smith and Ric Gallup, elder brother of Simon. The Cult Hero single was released on the Fiction Records label in December 1979, while the Magspies/Obtainers split single appeared on Dance Fools Dance the following year. (Note: Some sources (e.g. Butler's The Cure on Record) suggest that the Magspies/Obtainers single was released in 1979, whereas its release was announced by Ric Gallup of Dance Fools Dance (via the Cure's Clinic newsletter) as a new single in late 1980.)

==== The Stranglers and Associates: April 1980 ====
On 3 and 4 April 1980 at the Rainbow Theatre in London, Robert Smith and Matthieu Hartley (also of the Magspies, Cult Hero and by this time, the Cure) were among the many guest members of a unique line-up of the Stranglers to play two protest concerts for Hugh Cornwell, who had been imprisoned on drugs charges in late 1979. Joy Division were also one of the support bands on the second night. Recordings from the event were later released as The Stranglers and Friends – Live in Concert in 1995. Also during April, Smith provided backing vocals for the Associates' debut album The Affectionate Punch, released in August 1980. At the time, the Associates were also signed to Fiction Records, and had been joined in late 1979 by former Cure bassist Michael Dempsey. The Associates' front man Billy Mackenzie was a friend of Smith's for more than 20 years, and the Cure song, "Cut Here" (from 2001's Greatest Hits album), was written in response to Mackenzie's suicide in 1997. As Smith told Jam! Showbiz following the release of "Greatest Hits":

I kept passing on the opportunity to sit down and have a drink with him, have a chat ... I was very regretful. I had never used the words. I wrote them down to get it out of my system ... It is nice to sing a song that meant something, and to think it is going to be a single is a good thing. Strangely enough, it turned out to be the record company's favourite one (of the new songs).

==== And Also the Trees: 1981–1982 ====
During 1981, the Cure received a home demo tape from And Also the Trees and immediately became friends. Front-man Simon Huw Jones later told Abstract Magazine that the Cure were AATT's "biggest fans, the first people who came up to us and said 'we think you're great'" and that the two groups were mutually influenced by one another. The group joined the Cure in support of the Eight Appearances tour of Scotland and Northern England during November and December 1981, together with 1313, featuring Steve Severin and Lydia Lunch, and the following year Robert Smith together with Cure/Banshees co-producer Mike Hedges co-produced And Also the Trees' 1982 cassette release From Under the Hill. Smith was initially to have also produced the band's debut single "The Secret Sea", but instead Lol Tolhurst stepped in as producer between 1982–84, both for the band's first two singles, and for their self-titled debut album. Smith would again collaborate with And Also the Trees in 1991.

==== Post-Pornography projects: 1982 ====
In the wake of the Cure's Fourteen Explicit Moments tour, which culminated in the departure of Simon Gallup and the temporary dissolution of the Cure, in June 1982, Smith began collaborating with Severin of Siouxsie and the Banshees again. Although released under the name of the Cure, the only personnel to perform on the original Flexipop single release of "Lament" in August 1982 were Smith and Severin as co-producer, and soon afterwards, Smith admitted that the Cure as a band now existed in name only. That August, Smith briefly resurrected the Dance Fools Dance label to record and release the single "Frame One" by Crawley gothic/post-punk outfit Animation. In September, Smith with Tolhurst (now on keyboards) and session drummer Steve Goulding went into the studio to record a "blatant pop single" at the instigation of Fiction Records manager Chris Parry. Smith was reportedly so unhappy with the resultant track "Let's Go to Bed" that he attempted to have the single released under the name of Recur, feeling that the single let Cure fans down. During October, Smith and Severin also recorded early demos for what would become the Glove's "Punish Me With Kisses" single, at Mike Hedges' studio "The Playground".

Smith also returned to touring as a live guitarist with Siouxsie and the Banshees from November, following the collapse of then-Banshee John McGeoch from nervous exhaustion one week before the band were due to go on tour. His return to guitar duties with the group prompted Smith to remark:

Once a Banshee, always a Banshee.

He later said that he was "fed up" and "really disillusioned" with the pressures of playing in the Cure, and that "the Banshees thing came along and I thought it would be a really good escape". Journalist/biographer Jo-Ann Greene noted that Smith's replacement of McGeoch "left a bad taste in many people's mouths, as [McGeoch] was informed of his sacking only a week after his recovery from a brief spell of clinical depression".

==== The Venomettes and Marc and the Mambas: 1983 ====
Returning to England from the Banshees' tour of Australia, New Zealand, and Japan in January 1983, Smith was approached the following month by Nicholas Dixon, a young choreographer with the Royal Ballet, to score a choreographed adaptation of Les Enfants Terribles. To test the idea, Smith and Severin recorded a reworking of the Cure's "Siamese Twins", with Tolhurst on drums, and Anne Stephenson and Virginia Hewes (later known as Ginni Ball) of the Venomettes on violins, which was performed on BBC Two's music programme Riverside in March 1983, featuring two dancers choreographed by Dixon. Despite a positive critical reception, however, neither Dixon nor Smith were happy with the results, and the Les Enfants Terribles project was shelved indefinitely. (Note: Severin was unavailable for the television appearance, so Porl Thompson appeared miming the bass, disguised in a long coat and hat.)

Smith and Severin meanwhile co-wrote the music to Marc and the Mambas' song "Torment", which appeared on the album Torment and Toreros. Between March and June 1983, Smith recorded with the Glove and (ostensibly) the Cure; prompting him to remark: "I need a holiday ... I keep making plans to go every week, but every week I'm in another group."

==== The Glove: 1983 ====
Smith and Severin had first discussed collaborating on an external side-project in 1981, although their respective commitments to the Cure and the Banshees had previously left no time for the project. From May 1983, however, with the Cure on hold and Siouxsie and Budgie working together as the Creatures, recording of the Glove's album Blue Sunshine began in earnest. Budgie's then girlfriend Jeanette Landray, formerly a dancer with Zoo, was recruited to perform vocals, while Andy Anderson from Brilliant was brought in to play drums. The Venomettes with Martin McCarrick were hired to perform strings in studio. The Glove took its name from the "murder mitten" from the Beatles' animated feature Yellow Submarine, while the album title came from a B-movie by the same name about a potent strain of LSD that caused people to lose their hair and turn into homicidal maniacs many years after their first trip. Severin said of the project:

Obviously there was an interest in psychedelia. We didn't have any set idea of what we wanted to do. After a few pointless discussions we just went in and started writing songs, and eventually honed in on shared interests, one of which happened to be late 60's garbage, but nothing hippy-dippy. The problem for us was how can we get Barbarella onto a record sleeve and not be seen as idiots.

Smith described the creation of the album by saying:

I thought it was a real attack on the senses when we were doing it. We were virtually coming out of the studio at six in the morning, coming back here and watching all these really mental films and then going to sleep and having really demented dreams and then, as soon as we woke up at four in the afternoon, we'd go virtually straight back into the studio, so, it was a bit like a mental assault course towards the end ... I mean, God, we must have watched about 600 videos at the time!

As well as Barbarella, Yellow Submarine and the eponymous Blue Sunshine, films cited as having fuelled the project included The Brood, Evil Dead, The Helicopter Spies and Inferno. Retrospectively, the Melody Maker's Steve Sutherland described the Glove as "a manic psychedelic pastiche".

==== Member of the Banshees, single with Tim Pope: 1983–1984 ====
The Glove's Blue Sunshine album and its lead single "Like an Animal" were both released in August 1983, followed by the Siouxsie and the Banshees' single "Dear Prudence" (a cover of the Beatles' song) in September, all on the Banshees' own label Wonderland Records. Smith officially became a member of the Banshees. According to the Banshees' authorised biography, "Dear Prudence" had been recorded at Smith's insistence to document his time with the group, and it became their biggest UK hit, reaching number 3 on the Singles Chart.

Shortly before the group's scheduled Royal Albert Hall concerts in September and October 1983, Siouxsie and the Banshees were also invited to participate in an episode of Channel 4's television series "Play at Home", which they agreed to in order to take advantage of having the upcoming concerts filmed. The band with Smith decided to adapt Alice in Wonderland to tie the theme with the Banshees' Wonderland recording label. The result was a 45-minute television programme featuring performances from Siouxsie and the Banshees, the Glove and the Creatures, in which all four members of the Banshees appeared in a recreation of the Mad Hatter's Tea Party dressed as Alice, while each individual member scripted their own solo character performance and monologue. Musical interludes included the Glove performing "A Blues in Drag", the Creatures playing "Weathercade" and the whole band performing "Circle". The programme (which did not air on television until the following year) concluded with live footage of Siouxsie and the Banshees playing "Voodoo Dolly" and "Helter Skelter" live at the Royal Albert Hall. Meanwhile, both the Glove's second single, "Punish Me with Kisses", and the Banshees' live double album and companion video, Nocturne from the Royal Albert Hall shows, appeared in November. In March 1984, the next Banshees single to feature Smith on guitar and keyboards, "Swimming Horses" was released; Smith co-composed the new material with them. This was followed by "Dazzle" in May, and finally the album Hyæna in June – Smith having left the Banshees the month prior to release, citing health issues due to his overloaded schedule.

Meanwhile, in between commitments to the Cure, the Glove and the Banshees, Smith also found time to perform on Tim Pope's Syd Barrett-inspired "I Want To Be A Tree" single. Pope at the time was the regular director of promotional videos for the Cure, Siouxsie and the Banshees and Marc Almond, among others, but was taken aback when his fame on American MTV as a video director began to rival that of the bands he worked for. He described the project as "a real piss-take of what was going on in America", prompted by people referring to "Tim Pope Videos", and said that he "felt really strongly that they were not Tim Pope videos, they were Cure videos or Siouxsie videos or whatever". Over the 1983 Christmas holidays, Pope and a friend, Charles Gray, recorded what Pope described as "this really stupid song" that they had co-written years earlier as teenagers. Pope made an accompanying video for his showreel, asking several of the artists he worked with (The Cure, Siouxsie and the Banshees, Soft Cell, Talk Talk, the Style Council, Paul Young and Freur) to "come along and slag me off on the showreel". He then played the artists the song, while filming their reactions to it. The Old Grey Whistle Test screened the video, which Pope says resulted in several record deals being offered. The song was re-recorded with Robert Smith playing most instruments in January 1984, produced by Chris Parry, and was released on Fiction Records (with a new video) in June.

==== Remixes, Cranes, Pirate Ships, And Also the Trees: 1984–1993 ====
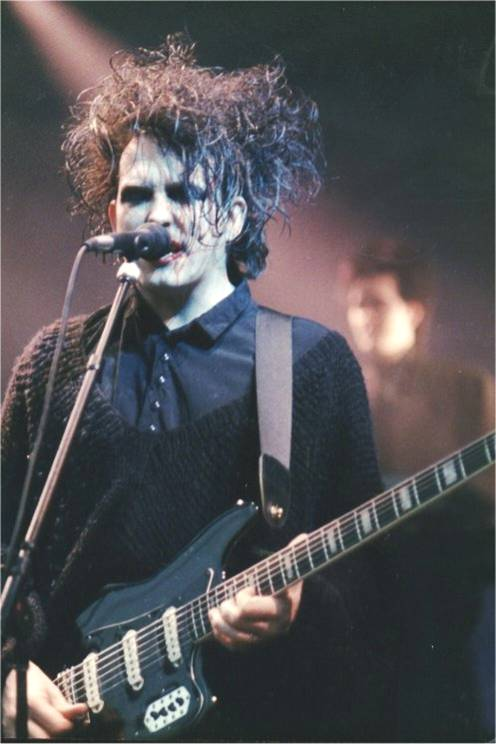
Smith with the Cure during the 1989 Prayer Tour

With the completion of the Blue Sunshine project and his departure from Siouxsie and the Banshees, by 1984 Robert Smith had returned to recording and touring with the Cure as his full-time primary band. Between 1985 and 1996, his musical outings beyond the Cure were comparatively rare, with notable exceptions including remix work for And Also the Trees and Cranes. During 1989, Smith and producer Mark Saunders remixed 7″ and 12″ versions of the song "The Pear Tree", by And Also the Trees. The "Round Mix" of the song also appeared on the band's album Farewell to the Shade in 1989, followed by a US-only release of The Pear Tree EP the following year. In December that year while mixing the Cure's live album Entreat, he also recorded a solo cover version of Wendy Waldman's "Pirate Ships", (Note: Credited by Smith to Judy Collins, who had previously also recorded a version of the song – see "Judith – Judy Collins" (review), Allmusic. Retrieved 12 October 2012.) originally intended for Rubáiyát: Elektra's 40th Anniversary; a compilation album celebrating the history of the Cure's US label Elektra Records. Instead, however, the full band line-up of the Cure recorded "Hello, I Love You" by the Doors for Elektra, and "Pirate Ships" did not see official CD release until Disintegration's "Deluxe Edition" reissue in 2010. (Note: "Pirate Ships" did, however, see release as a download from the Cure's website in 2001 – see "The Cure's 'Disintegration' gets 3CD deluxe reissue in 2010, plus 'In Orange' on DVD", Slicing Up Eyeballs, 8 August 2009; retrieved 12 October 2012.)

In 1992, Smith invited Cranes to support the Cure live on the Wish Tour. For one of the French dates of the tour (Stade Couvert Régional, Liévin, 15 November 1992), Cranes' vocalist Alison Shaw was ill and the group had to revise their entire set, with Robert Smith replacing Alison's vocal melodies on 6-string bass, and joined by the Cure's guitarist Porl Thompson. (Note: Thompson had also joined the group on stage on 8 November, and on the final night of the tour in Ireland on 3 December, Cranes joined the Cure on stage for the final encore of the Cure's "Forever".) Cranes wrote most of their next album (1993's Forever) while on the Wish Tour, and the album's title was partly influenced by touring with the Cure. In 1993, Smith and Bryan "Chuck" New remixed the extended 12" version of Cranes' single "Jewel" from the album; Smith again contributing his trademark Fender Bass VI sound and additional guitars to the remixed track. The single gave Cranes their first Top 30 single in Britain and Norway, and also became their biggest commercial breakthrough in the US.

==== Bowie, Reeves Gabrels, Mark Plati, and COGASM: 1994–1999 ====
From 1993, Smith's primary musical engagement was the recording of The Cure's album Wild Mood Swings, released in 1996 and followed by the Swing Tour, concluding in early 1997. He was meanwhile invited to perform at David Bowie's 50th Birthday concert at Madison Square Garden (9 January 1997), where he duetted with Bowie on "The Last Thing You Should Do" and "Quicksand". Here Smith met Bowie's guitarist Reeves Gabrels and co-producer Mark Plati, leading to their collaboration on the single "Wrong Number". Although released under the name of the Cure, "Wrong Number" was one of several "one-off" studio projects recorded during this period by Robert Smith either performing solo, or with guest musicians from outside the full-time line-up of the Cure. Earlier versions of the song had already been recorded by the band, but Plati and Smith completely reconstructed the track, built around a sampled drum loop by Cure drummer Jason Cooper. Smith and Plati added keyboards, effects and new vocals, while Gabrels laid down "a gazillion guitar tracks".

In February 1998, Robert again collaborated with Reeves Gabrels in the studio, co-writing, singing and playing on the song "Yesterday's Gone" (eventually finding its way to CD release in 2000). The following month, Smith was again recording solo between RAK and Outside studios, assisted this time by co-producer Paul Corkett, whose production credits included Nick Cave, Björk, Placebo, Tori Amos and Suede. These sessions produced "More Than This" (not to be confused with the Roxy Music song) for The X-Files: The Album, and a cover of Depeche Mode's "World in My Eyes" for the tribute album For the Masses. Again, both were released under the name of the Cure, but were essentially Robert Smith solo recordings. Having made a guest appearance on an episode of South Park earlier in the year, Smith again collaborated with Trey Parker under the name COGASM, featuring Reeves Gabrels and Jason Cooper, releasing the track "A Sign from God" for the film Orgazmo. Smith's contribution to "Yesterday's Gone" appeared on Gabrels' solo album Ulysses (Della Notte) released in 1999 via Internet and in 2000 on CD by E-magine Music.

==== More collaborations: 2003–2007 ====
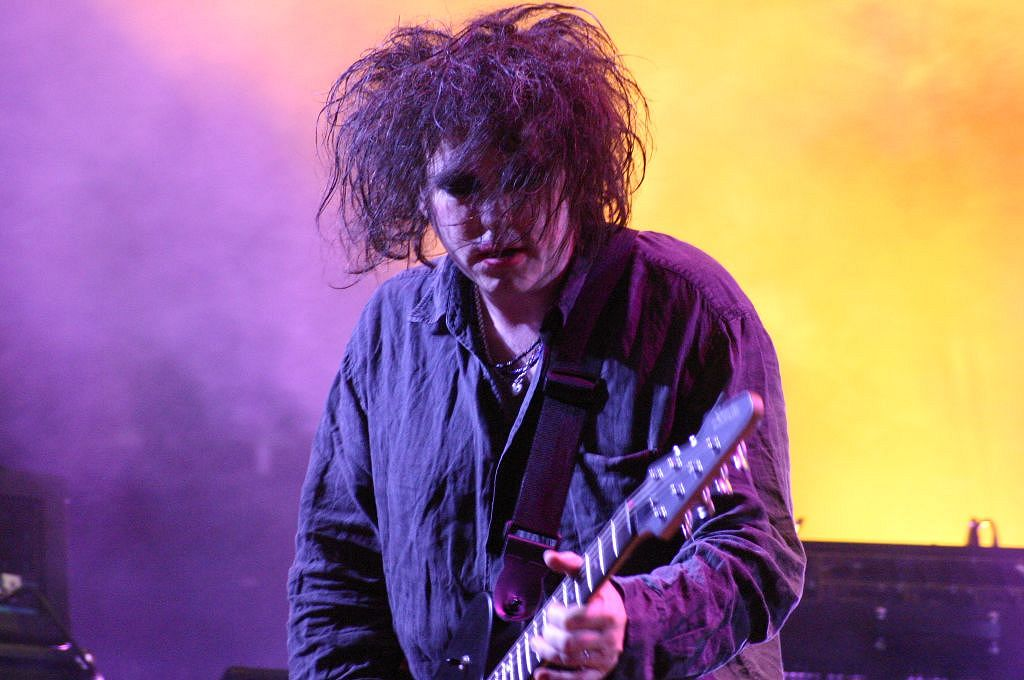
Smith performing as part of The Cure in 2004

In 2002, as Exclaim! magazine's Cam Lindsay later observed, the Cure became "the band to namedrop as a musical influence, sparking rejuvenation for their career. Artists such as Deftones, Mogwai, Tricky and Thursday praise the band and stress their influence, while others like Hot Hot Heat and the Rapture receive constant comparisons". From 2003–2004 a steady succession of guest vocal performances were released with other recording artists "feat. Robert Smith". Smith wrote the words and sang "Perfect Blue Sky (feat. Robert Smith)" for Dutch electronic music producer Junkie XL's album Radio JXL: A Broadcast from the Computer Hell Cabin, released in June 2003; "All of This (feat. Robert Smith)" for Blink-182's self-titled album released in November, and "Believe (feat. Robert Smith)" on veteran Bowie guitarist Earl Slick's Zig Zag album, released 9 December 2003. Slick meanwhile contributed guitars to the Mark Plati mix of "A Forest" featured on the Join the Dots box-set on 27 January 2004. Although issued under the moniker of the Cure, the "Mark Plati mix" was in fact an entirely new recording resulting from the studio collaborations between Slick, Plati and Smith. Smith had also recorded vocals for another completely new version of "A Forest" during 2003, this time billed as a cover version by the German electronic duo "Blank & Jones (feat. Robert Smith)". Released in September 2003, the single reached number 14 in the German Top100 Singles charts, and three separate remixes later appeared on the 2004 album Monument; "A Forest" being described by AllMusic's Rick Anderson as "the centerpiece of the album".

January 2004 also saw the single release of Junior Jack's "Da Hype (feat. Robert Smith)", which also appeared on the Belgium-based Italian house music producer's album Trust It in March. During the same month, an exclusive re-recording of the Cure's "Pictures of You", remixed by Australian electronic musician/producer Paul Mac and released under the banner "Robert Smith – Pictures of You (Paulmac mix)", featured in the soundtrack to the Australian "rave culture" film One Perfect Day. "Truth Is (Featuring – Robert Smith)" appeared on former Nine Inch Nails drummer and co-founder Chris Vrenna's second Tweaker album 2 a.m. Wakeup Call, released 20 April 2004. In 2004, on 17 September at Old Billingsgate Market in London, Smith joined Blink-182 live onstage to perform "All of This" during the MTV Icon tribute to the Cure. On 21 October, Robert stood in as one of three guest presenters for John Peel on BBC Radio 1, just days before Peel's death. (Note: Underworld presented the show on 19 October, and Siouxsie Sioux on 20 October. Peel died on 25 October 2004.) Near the end of the year, Robert Smith made two guest appearances live at Wembley Arena; first joining Placebo on 5 November on their song "Without You I'm Nothing" and the Cure's "Boys Don't Cry", followed by Blink-182 on 6 December to perform "All of This" and again, "Boys Don't Cry".

In June 2005, Smith appeared on Smashing Pumpkins/Zwan front man Billy Corgan's solo debut TheFutureEmbrace, sharing vocal duties during the refrain for Corgan's cover of the Bee Gees song "To Love Somebody". In November 2006, Robert appeared on UK trance and trip hop act Faithless's album To All New Arrivals, on the track "Spiders, Crocodiles & Kryptonite", featuring prominent samples of the Cure's "Lullaby", for which Smith recorded a new performance of the original vocal. Another guest vocal on Paul Hartnoll of Orbital's song "Please" was released as a single and appeared on The Ideal Condition in May 2007. Placebo's Steve Hewitt meanwhile announced plans to launch a solo dance/drum'n'bass-influenced album under the working title of Ancient B to feature Smith singing some tracks, and bassist Jon Thorne of Lamb.

==== More guest vocals, plus solo cover versions: 2010–2026 ====
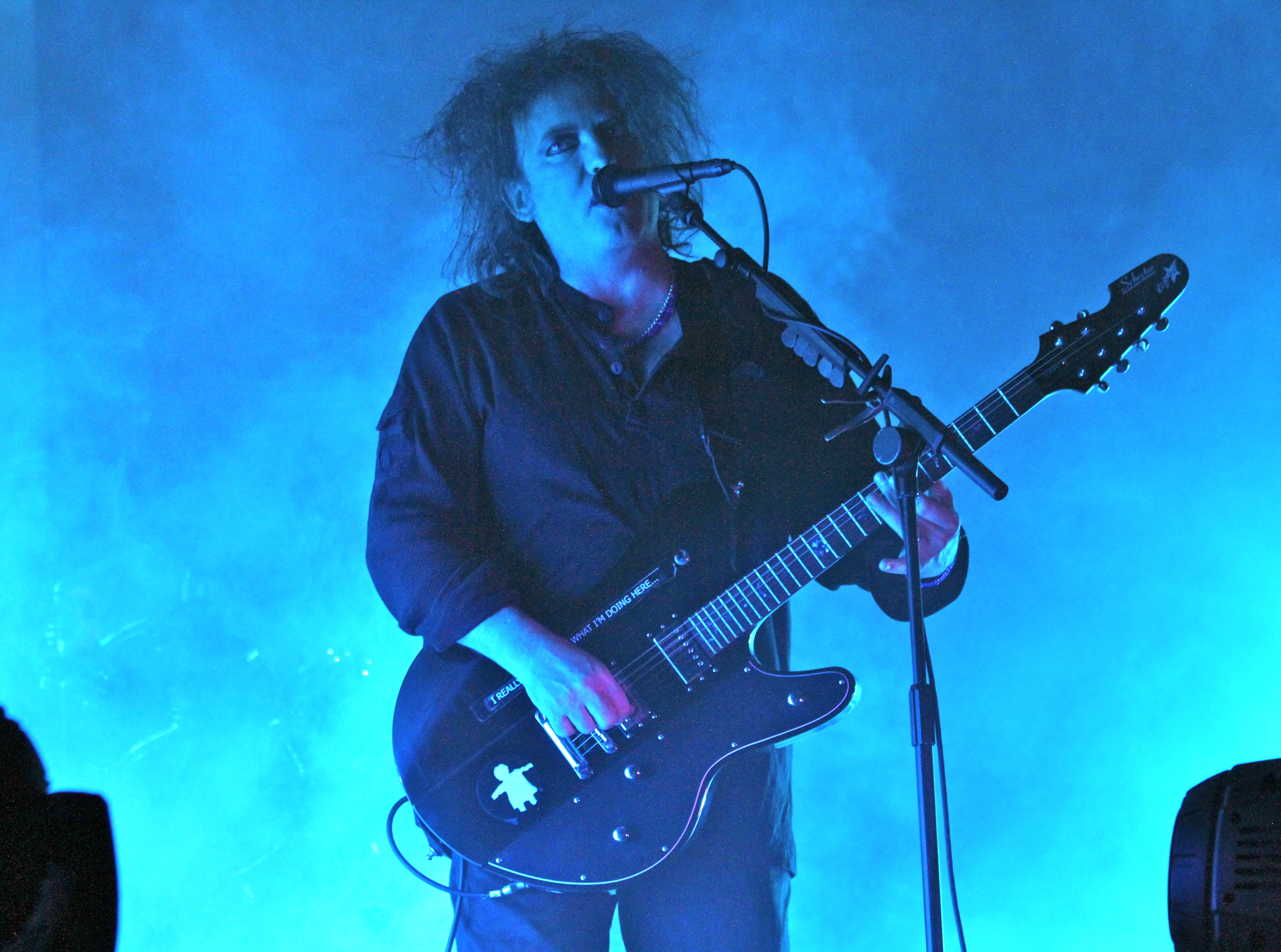
Smith performing as part of The Cure at Frequency Festival in 2012

From 2010 to 2012, as well as continuing to collaborate with other artists as a guest performer, many cover versions were released by Robert Smith performing solo. Unlike his previous solo covers (such as "Pirate Ships" and "World in My Eyes"), these were officially released under the name of Robert Smith, rather than the Cure. In 2010, he contributed a cover of "Very Good Advice" from the 1951 film adaptation of Alice in Wonderland to the album Almost Alice; a companion release to Tim Burton's adaptation of Alice in Wonderland, while "Pirate Ships" from 1989 also saw release on CD for the first time. Further guest vocalist/lyricist collaborations "feat. Robert Smith" during 2010 included the single "J'aurai tout essayé" (a reworking of Smith and Earl Slick's "Believe") by French Canadian rock singer, guitarist and fellow Bowie/Mark Plati/Earl Slick collaborator Anik Jean and the single version of Crystal Castles' "Not in Love", a cover of Platinum Blonde's song of the same name, released on Fiction Records, 6 December 2010. In June 2011, electronic dance act the Japanese Popstars from Northern Ireland released their album Controlling Your Allegiance in the UK, including the track "Take Forever (Ft. Robert Smith)", (Note: The album was released in Japan in March 2011, and teasers of the Robert Smith track were available from the Chain of Flowers fan-site. See: "Teaser: The Cure's Robert Smith and the Japanese Popstars, 'Take Forever'", Slicing Up Eyeballs, 19 March 2011; retrieved 12 October 2012.) and the following month, a solo cover version of "Small Hours" by British singer-songwriter and guitarist John Martyn (1948–2009) was released on the tribute album Johnny Boy Would Love This. On 25 October 2011, instrumental rock band 65daysofstatic released the track "Come to Me" featuring Robert Smith as a free download, coinciding with the release of their album We Were Exploding Anyway. In 2012 Robert again recorded a solo cover version for a Tim Burton project; this time covering Frank Sinatra's 1957 hit song "Witchcraft" for Frankenweenie Unleashed!, a 14-track collection of songs "inspired by" the filmmaker's stop-motion film, Frankenweenie, released on 25 September 2012.

In 2015, Smith contributed vocals to the song "Please" from the album 8:58, a project by Paul Hartnoll. The track is in fact a reworking of the track of the same name from The Ideal Condition, which he also contributed vocals for. On 15 June 2015, the Twilight Sad released a single featuring Smith covering "There's a Girl in the Corner", originally from the Twilight Sad's album Nobody Wants to Be Here and Nobody Wants to Leave. In 2015, Smith also contributed vocals to "In All Worlds", a single from Eat Static's album Dead Planet.

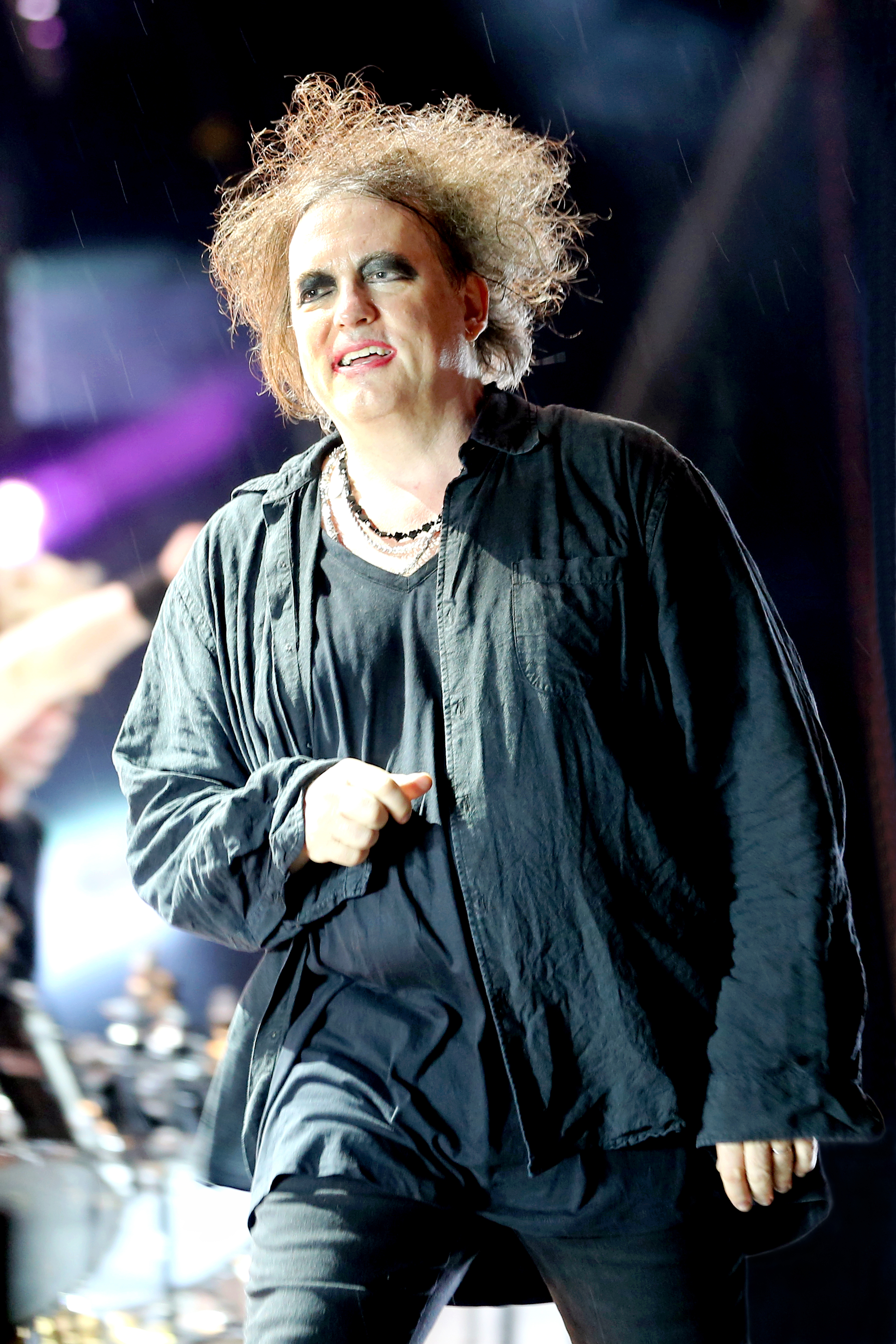
Smith performing as part of The Cure at Southside Festival in 2019

In September 2020, Smith appeared on the Gorillaz' song "Strange Timez" from their Song Machine series and also appeared in the song's animated music video.

In December 2020, Smith took part in two live stream charity events, including The Cosmic Shambles Network's "Nine Lessons and Carols for Curious People" 24-hour charity live stream, 12 December 2020. Smith played three songs from the Seventeen Seconds album: "In Your House", "M" and "Play for Today". On 22 December 2020, Smith played three songs from the Faith album, "The Holy Hour", "The Funeral Party", and "The Drowning Man", for the live stream the annual Second City 24-hour improvisation charity event for "Letters to Santa"

In June 2021, Smith appeared on the Chvrches song "How Not To Drown" from their album Screen Violence.

In October 2023, Smith appeared on the Crosses song "Girls Float † Boys Cry" off the album Goodnight, God Bless, I Love U, Delete.

Smith appeared as a guest during Olivia Rodrigo's set at the 2025 Glastonbury Festival, and performed "Just Like Heaven" and "Friday I'm In Love" with her. Smith appeared on Rodrigo's song "What's Wrong with Me" from her album You Seem Pretty Sad for a Girl So in Love.

Smith appeard on Foreign Tongues, a studio album by The Rolling Stones which was released on 10 July 2026.

== Musical influences ==
Smith has credited his older siblings Richard and Margaret with exposing him to rock music such as the Beatles and the Rolling Stones when he was six years old. He has said that his early songwriting "was influenced by early Beatles – the sense of a three-minute guitar-pop song", and early in his career the Cure's second single "Boys Don't Cry" was compared by British music paper Record Mirror to "John Lennon at 12 or 13". His parents encouraged their children's musical development, as he told French magazine Les Inrockuptibles: "My parents were lending us their stuff; my mum made me listen to a lot of classical music to enable me to have a larger vision of music." When Smith was eight years old in 1967, Richard played him "Purple Haze" by Jimi Hendrix, who became hugely influential. Of this period, he went on to say, "My brother was also crazy about Captain Beefheart, Cream, Jimi Hendrix, so much so that when I was 7 or 8, to the despair of my parents, I became some kinda little devil fed on psychedelic rock."

Smith was 10 years old in 1969 when he first heard Nick Drake's album Five Leaves Left: "Nick Drake's on the other side of the coin to Jimi Hendrix. He was very quiet and withdrawn ... I think also that because he had an untimely death like Jimi Hendrix, he was never able to compromise his early work. He was never able to put a foot wrong. It's a morbid romanticism, but there is something attractive about that." It was not long afterwards that Robert Smith attended his first rock concert: Jimi Hendrix at the 1970 Isle of Wight Festival. At the age of 13 in 1972, Smith first saw David Bowie on television, performing "Starman" on Top of the Pops. He recalled, "Every person in Britain who saw that performance, it's stuck with them. It's like Kennedy being shot for another generation. You just remember that night watching David Bowie on TV. It really was a formative, seminal experience." Smith said that the first LP he ever purchased with his pocket money was The Rise and Fall of Ziggy Stardust and the Spiders from Mars. According to Apter, Bowie also paved the way for Smith's love of glam rock bands such as Slade, the Sweet, and T. Rex, and during the same period, he also became a fan of Roxy Music. His parents maintained their supportive attitude: "My mum and dad were encouraging us to talk [about] the records we liked. I remember staggering talks about Slade and Gary Glitter."

Smith said that he was 15 when he first heard Alex Harvey, and that the Sensational Alex Harvey Band was the first and only group he ever really followed. He said, "[Harvey] was probably my only real idol. I travelled around the country to see them. [...] People talk about Iggy Pop as the original punk but certainly in Britain the forerunner of the punk movement was Alex Harvey. [...] I remembered the power of that live performance and I've tried to have that in my mind since I started up my own group." He soon became influenced by the emergence of the UK punk scene of 1977 and has cited the Sex Pistols, the Stranglers, Elvis Costello and the Buzzcocks as important influences on his own music from this period. In 1993, he described the release of "Anarchy in the UK" by the Sex Pistols as "the last time something major happened to me and changed me [...] it was the best summer of my life. I remember listening to 'Anarchy' for the very first time at a party and thinking, 'This is it!' You knew straight away, you either loved it or hated it, and it polarised an entire nation for that summer." Elsewhere, Smith said that the Stranglers were his favourite punk band and that Costello "was a cut above the whole lot of them" in terms of lyrics and song crafting.

Smith was influenced by Siouxsie and the Banshees' "wall of noise" and the Buzzcocks' melodies, and aspired to combine the two. He said, "The two groups that I aspired to be like were [Siouxsie and] the Banshees and the Buzzcocks. I really liked the Buzzcocks' melodies, while the great thing about the Banshees was that they had this great wall of noise, which I'd never heard before. My ambition was to marry the two." Ian Birch of Melody Maker recognised the Banshees' influence on Smith's band early on, comparing the Cure's 1978 debut single "Killing An Arab" favourably to Siouxsie's "Hong Kong Garden" (released a few months earlier). Speaking of his stint of playing guitar with Siouxsie and the Banshees in 1979, Smith said, "It allowed me to experiment. I inherited an approach from John [McKay] which was just to have everything full up. [...] It was phased/flanged distortion noise." From that time, Siouxsie and the Banshees "were a massive influence on me". He said, "They were the group who led me towards doing Pornography. They drew something out of me."

Along with the Banshees, early Cure gigs from 1978–1979 supporting other post-punk bands such as Wire and Joy Division also influenced Smith's shift in musical direction from the Cure's 1979 album Three Imaginary Boys to 1980's second album Seventeen Seconds. Playing support for Wire (at Kent University in October 1978) gave Smith the idea "to follow a different course, to hold out against the punk wave [...] Wire pointed out another direction to me". When asked what were his five favorite guitar tracks, Smith listed "Purple Haze" by Hendrix, "Hanging Around" by Hugh Cornwell of the Stranglers, "Head Cut" by John McGeoch of Siouxsie and the Banshees, "White Riot" by Mick Jones/Joe Strummer of the Clash and "White Light/White Heat" by Lou Reed of the Velvet Underground.

During the 1980s, Smith mostly listened to disco and/or Irish bands such as the Dubliners as a means of avoiding his contemporaries, until he discovered the 1991 album Loveless by shoegaze pioneers My Bloody Valentine and stated, "[My Bloody Valentine] was the first band I heard who quite clearly pissed all over us, and their album Loveless is certainly one of my all-time three favourite records. It's the sound of someone [Shields] who is so driven that they're demented. And the fact that they spent so much time and money on it is so excellent."

== Musicianship ==
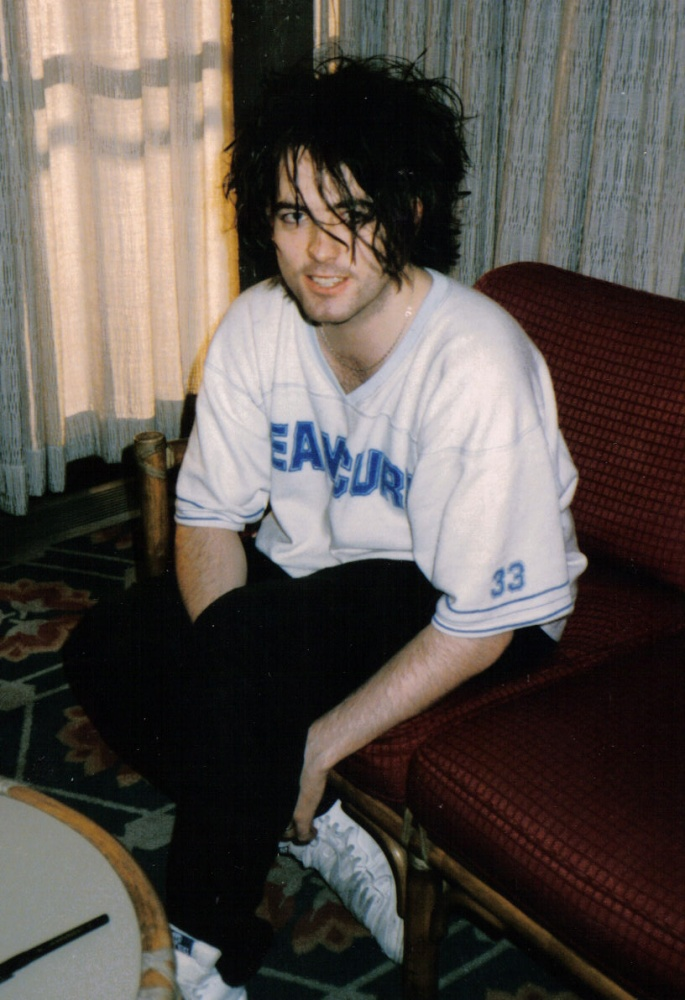
Smith in 1985

=== Songwriting ===
In an interview in 2000, Smith said that "there is one particular kind of music, an atmospheric type of music, that I enjoy making with the Cure. I enjoy it a lot more than any other kind of sound". When Smith was asked about the 'sound' of his songwriting, Smith said that he did not "think there is such a thing as a typical Cure sound. I think there are various Cure sounds from different periods and different line-ups."

=== Guitar playing ===
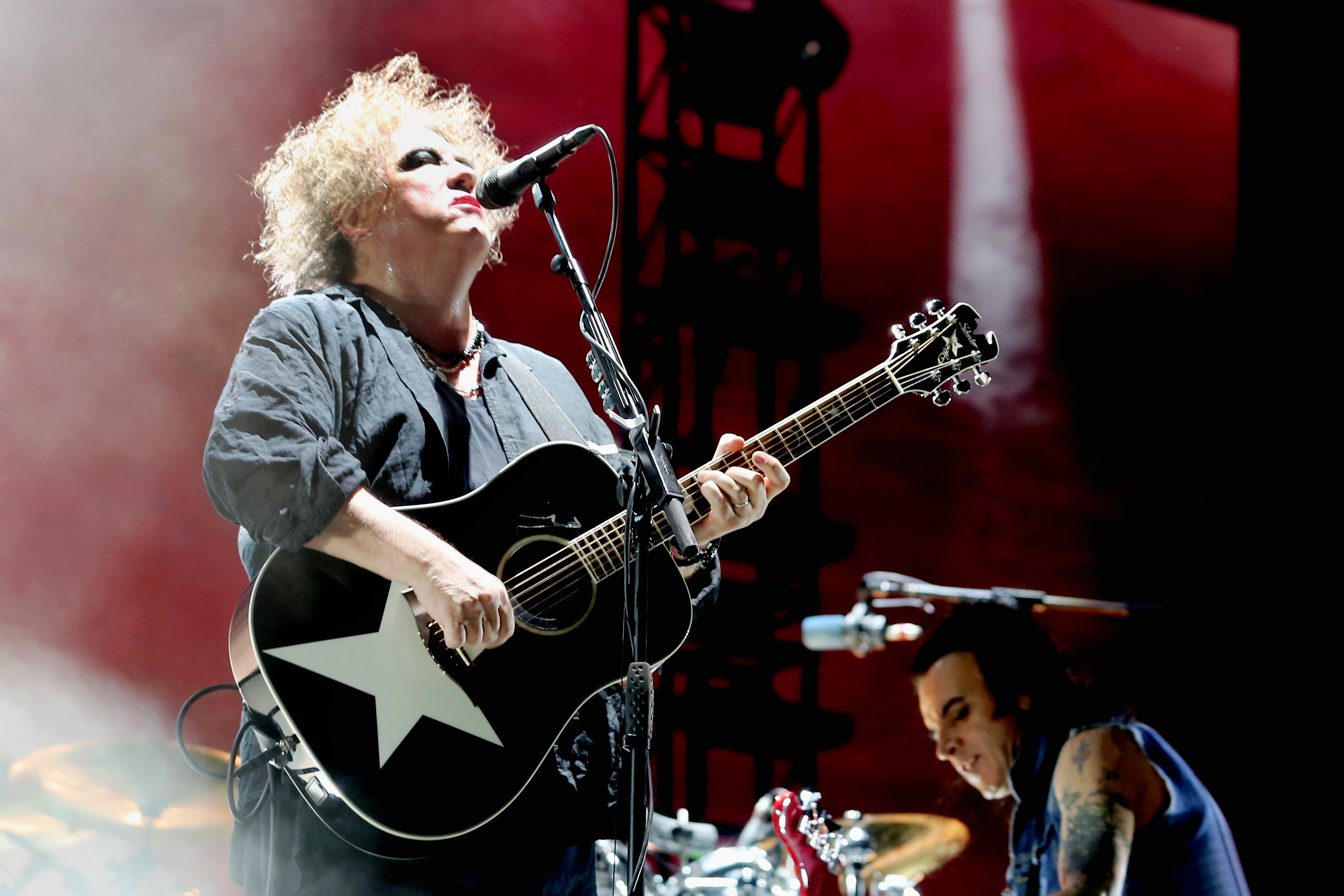
Smith playing acoustic guitar at Southside Festival in 2019

Smith is considered to be one of the most influential and underrated guitarists of the 20th century. In 2022, Andrew Daly of Guitar World ranked him at number four in the "22 guitar heroes who shaped the sound of '80s indie and alternative rock", saying he "set the gold standard for post-punk, goth rock, new wave, and art rock" and praising his "skillful blending of melody and a never-ending desire to genre hop."

In a 1992 interview with Guitar Player, Smith shared insights from his first guitar lessons—undertaken at the age of nine years—and his guitar-playing style, such as alternative tunings as well as his habit of purposely detuning the high "E" (first) string on his guitars. Of his first lessons, Smith stated:

I started on classical guitar, actually. I had lessons from age nine with a student of John Williams, a really excellent guitarist. [...] I learned a lot, but got to the point where I was losing the sense of fun. I wish I'd stuck with it. I still read music, but it takes me too long to work through a piece.

Smith also described his detuning process: "I don't know what it adds, but the guitar just doesn't sound quite right to me normally. In the studio, I often defy the tuners, particularly with keyboard overdubs. I even change the speed of the tape to detune some parts. I think a lot of players presented with the same guitar and told to tune it themselves would come up with something drastically different. And the way you play [the guitar] affects the perceived tuning. If Porl [Thompson] and I tune together and play the same thing, but he plays hard and I play soft, it will sound completely off."

Speaking about Wish in 1992, Smith also offered the following input on how detuned instruments played a significant role in the album, and the challenges of capturing the sound live. "A lot of things on our record Wish that sound like heavy chorusing are actually just detuned instruments. The only drawback to that is onstage it's very confusing sometimes, especially with lots of phasing effects going on. It turns into this overwhelming pulsing sound, and you can't hear anything."

While recording the Cure's debut album, Three Imaginary Boys, in 1978, Smith was using a Woolworth's Top 20 electric guitar, and he was advised by Chris Parry to use a better instrument. Smith bought a Fender Jazzmaster, having recently seen Elvis Costello playing one on Top of the Pops. He then decided to have the Top 20 pickup installed in the Jazzmaster, giving it a third pickup. Smith explained this guitar customization in 1992: "The third pickup [in the Fender Jazzmaster] is from a Woolworth's Top 20 guitar, my very first electric. I took it in to record our first album, along with a little WEM combo amp. [Manager/producer] Chris Parry, who was paying for the record, said," you can't use that!" We went out and bought a Fender Jazzmaster, and I immediately had the Top 20 pickup installed in it, which really upset Chris. I played the entire Three Imaginary Boys album through a Top 20 pickup. It's a brilliant guitar, though I actually bought it because of how it looked."

Smith's guitar work was first heard on the first Cure single "Killing An Arab", which was released in December 1978, where Smith performed an intricate Middle Eastern sounding descending and ascending guitar riff to accompany the song, as well as the B-side "10:15 Saturday Night", where Smith played a heavily distorted 'tremolo bar' solo. Smith would soon expand on his guitar style further with the Cure's second album, Seventeen Seconds, notably on the single "A Forest", where Smith played an extended solo-outro on his Jazzmaster, as well as the single "Play For Today", where Smith demonstrated an intricate use of harmonics.

With every Cure album release onward, Smith would incorporate a number of different guitars and sounds into the Cure's repertoire with stylistic versatility and craftsmanship over the course of 30 years. Notably, starting with The Top, in 1984, Smith started incorporating Spanish acoustic guitars (notably on the songs "Birdmad Girl", and "The Caterpillar"), and from the mid-80s onward Smith included more acoustic guitar instrumentation on later Cure songs such as "The Blood", as well as notable singles such as "In Between Days", "Just Like Heaven", and "Friday I'm In Love". On the 1987 release Kiss Me, Kiss Me, Kiss Me, Smith showcased a diverse style of guitar playing across the 17-track album. Notably on the opening track "The Kiss" where Smith played an extended Wah-wah pedal introductory solo that opened the LP, as well as the single "Hot Hot Hot!!!" where Smith included an intricate funk playing style that intersected with Porl Thompson's guitar lines. Another ingredient of Smith's guitar sound is the Fender Bass VI. It proved to be a staple of the Cure's sound during the early 1980s on albums such as Faith, was used as the main instrument on the Carnage Visors instrumental soundtrack that the band recorded that same year, and was later played by Smith extensively on the 1989 release Disintegration. Smith shared the following input of his use of the Fender VI:

I added the six-string bass on the Faith album. I think [producer] Mike Hedges stole it. I'm not sure from whom, but he said they'd never miss it. He worked with a lot of big-name artists and he felt it was his duty as a socialist to relieve them of some of their worldly possessions. So he gave me that at the end of Seventeen Seconds. I actually wrote "Primary" on it and incorporated it into a few other things.

Smith wrote several songs on bass. He commented during an interview for the British magazine Making Music in 1987: "A lot of the songs that we've done over the years I've written on the bass. I think I've been influenced by listening to [Steven] Severin play really, strumming bass chords. I was given the six-string bass... and as soon as I got that I thought—ah, unusual sound, and I translated that back on to guitar".

Smith started incorporating more distortion and feedback sounds and textures on albums such as Wish where Smith predominantly played a Gibson Chet Atkins as well.

Speaking to The Hit, Smith gave a frank assessment of his approach to guitar playing, and musicianship in general. "I'm not technically a good player but at least I don't sound like anyone else. For me the idea of being a musician has nothing to do with technical ability, but I suppose you have to have a certain amount to be able to put ideas into music. I think it's important to get past the stage of being comfortable with an instrument. You need the capacity to learn – most people tend to stay at the same level, which [I think] is boring to listen to."

== Stage persona and image ==
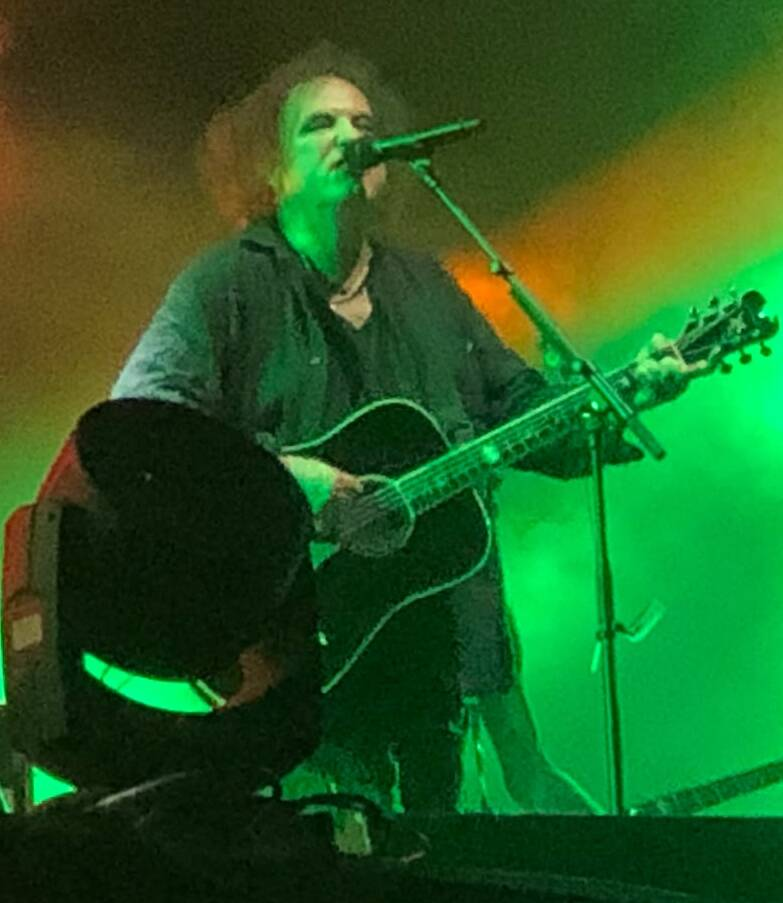
Smith performing in 2026

Smith started backcombing his hair, which had grown longer by the supporting tour for Pornography. He amplified his aesthetic of a pale complexion, smeared red lipstick, black eye-liner and black eyelids, dishevelled nest of wiry long black hair, all-black clothes, and brothel creeper shoes or trainers in 1984, when being the guitarist of Siouxsie and the Banshees and borrowing Siouxsie Sioux's lipstick. Paul Morley said Smith's look "became extreme" during his second stint as a guitarist for the Banshees: "that's when he started to dress like Siouxsie", "he started to be physically like Siouxsie". Around the same time, the goth subculture took off. He denied any credit for this trend and said it was a coincidence that the styles were similar. The sombre mood of early albums, combined with Smith's on-stage persona, cemented the band's gothic image. Although considered a goth icon, Smith said that his aesthetic was a "theatrical" custom.

In 1986, Smith altered his image by appearing on-stage sporting short spiky hair which can be seen in The Cure in Orange. His new look made the headlines. He soon returned to his usual style.

== In popular culture ==
=== Early television and film references ===
An early "pop culture" reference to the Cure is found in the eleventh episode of BBC2's anarchic alternative comedy series The Young Ones, from 1984. The series featured regular cameo performances from British rock and pop groups of the period, such as Motörhead, the Damned, and Madness. As the episode's title "Sick" suggests, all four of the main characters (Vyvyan, Rick, Neil and Mike) are ill, prompting Vyvyan to send Mike to the pharmacy for medicine. Neil remarks: "I hope Mike hurries back with the cure!" to which Vyvyan replies, "No Neil, Neil, it's madness this week." The band Madness then performs a musical cameo. Rock biographers Bowler and Dray note that increasing popular interest in the Cure in America during the mid-late 1980s became "a pat shorthand for TV and film writers to indicate mixed up children – the Steve Martin film Parenthood uses a bedroom poster of Robert to underline the point that 'this adolescent is confused and miserable'".

=== Edward Scissorhands and influence on Tim Burton (1988–2012) ===
In 1988, a Spin magazine interview with Smith reported that "the director of Pee-wee's Big Adventure" [Tim Burton] had asked Smith to make an appearance in a film. The Cure's keyboardist Roger O'Donnell has since said that during recording of the Disintegration album (1988–89), Burton approached the group about providing the soundtrack to the 1990 film Edward Scissorhands, and even sent them the script.

In a 1991 article discussing inspirations behind the look of the film's title character, Entertainment Weekly (citing Burton and costume designer Colleen Atwood) reported that "the character's retro hair and penchant for leather clearly draw on punks like the Cure's Robert Smith". Burton is a self-proclaimed fan of the Cure and his sartorial style has been likened to that of Smith. In 1996, Smith confirmed to French magazine Télérama that Burton had approached the Cure about a number of collaborations, and regularly kept in touch with the group about each of his latest film projects, but that they had thus far always been too busy either touring or recording to contribute. Burton asked Smith to score the soundtrack for Sleepy Hollow (1999), but Smith said that "they were postponing it so much that I got involved with [the Cure's album] Bloodflowers and let it aside". In 2009 Burton presented Smith with the Shockwaves NME Godlike Genius Award, saying that when he was "chained to a desk" and "fucking depressed" during his time as a young animator for Disney, "this music was the only thing that saved me. I just want to thank you for inspiring me." Shortly after the award ceremony, Burton again reiterated to BBC 6 Music his long-standing admiration for the Cure, and his desire to collaborate with them. Smith said that Burton presenting the Godlike Genius award "makes it all that more special". Smith has since contributed music to Burton's Almost Alice and Frankenweenie Unleashed! album projects (See → guest vocals + solo cover versions).

=== The Sandman (1989–1996) ===
Neil Gaiman, author and creator of Vertigo Comics' The Sandman (1989–1996), based the appearance of his lead character partly on that of Smith. Other illustrators of the character over the course of the series' run have also drawn influence from other popular musicians; Sam Kieth, for instance, describes his rendering of the Sandman character as the "David Bowie/guy-from-the-Cure" version, and said that the Robert Smith look of the character was "really heavily championed" by Gaiman and DC Comics editor Karen Berger. Mike Dringenberg, on the other hand, compared Kieth's Sandman to Ron Wood and Keith Richards of the Rolling Stones, and asserts "my version ... was more like Peter Murphy or Robert Smith." Conversely, Kelley Jones, who illustrated the Dream Country and Season of Mists (volumes 3 & 4 in the series), said he "just hated the Cure" and thus based his own version of the character on the angular gestures and facial features of Bauhaus front-man Peter Murphy instead. Gaiman said that early conceptual sketches for the character by Leigh Baulch and Dave McKean drew influence from Bowie's Aladdin Sane persona, and Bono from U2. Cure posters were also "known to creep into the background of some of the sandman stories" and Smith told fans that he was flattered by Gaiman's reference, and thought The Sandman was "a brilliant series".

=== The Crow (1989–1994) ===
Smith's lyrics, as well as those of Joy Division's Ian Curtis, were quoted and referenced extensively throughout James O'Barr's comic book series The Crow, which, like Gaiman's Sandman, also first appeared on shelves in 1989. One issue of The Crow dedicated an entire page to reprinting the lyrics from the Cure song "The Hanging Garden", and O'Barr said that he was listening a lot to the Cure's early albums such as Seventeen Seconds and Faith while he was writing the story. O'Barr has downplayed the influence of Robert Smith on the main character Eric Draven's physical appearance, saying that "the idea that the look has been inspired by him has really been overblown" and that the visual aspect of the character owed more to Peter Murphy and Iggy Pop. Smith said that the song "Burn", the Cure's contribution to the 1994 film adaptation's soundtrack, was deliberately written and performed in the style of "The Hanging Garden".

=== Other comic book and fan fiction references ===
Garth Ennis's Muzak Killer stories for 2000 AD Comics from 1991 also contain visual references in the form of characters resembling Robert Smith, and again, Smith himself is a self-professed fan of 2000 AD. Revolutionary Comics produced a biographical comic book on the Cure in 1991 as Issue No. 30 of Rock n Roll Comics series, and the following year Personality Comics produced their own Cure biography in the form of Music Comics 4: The Cure. Ian Shirley, author of Can Rock & Roll Save the World?: An Illustrated History of Music and Comics, considers the fact "that the Cure have spawned two biographical comics ... just shows the impact that Robert Smith and his Goth chic had upon America in the 1990s". In the 1980s, the Japanese music magazine 8-beat Gag published a series of caricatures of western artists by manga artist Atsuko Shima; Robert Smith had his own edition, and figured on the cover. Gothic horror and fantasy writer Poppy Z. Brite, in his vampire novel Lost Souls (1992), uses a poster of Robert Smith on a bedroom wall as a sexual prop during a homoerotic encounter between two of his characters, Laine and Nothing. Colin Raff of the New York Press described "Poppy Z. Brite's enthusiastic appraisal of Robert Smith's mouth in her (sic) depiction of a fictional blowjob" as "an example of the unfortunate habit of many fiction writers (especially since the 1980s) to invoke pop stars and their lyrics with un-ironic [sic] reverence, resulting in prose about as reflective as voyeuristic journalism, bad porn and bumperstickers".

=== Television parodies and cameos: 1990–1993 ===
In television comedy programs during the early 1990s, Smith was sometimes the subject of lampooning. MTV's Half Hour of Comedy Hour (1990–1991), featured a mock episode of This Old House in which a parody of Smith's Disintegration-era persona is seen asking building contractors to leave his house in a semi-demolished state to retain the sense of "urban decay". The Mary Whitehouse Experience (1992) poked fun at Smith's attempts to use lighter pop music to "show his happier side", by presenting a series of sketches in which Smith (played by Rob Newman) performs comedic novelty songs "The Laughing Policeman", "Tie Me Kangaroo Down, Sport", "Ernie", "Crash Bang Wallop", the theme to the children's programme Play Away, and the WWI soldiers' "Chinese crackers in your arsehole" parody version of the patriotic anthem "Rule, Britannia!". Newman portrayed Smith dolefully wailing the lyrics over a backdrop of gloomy Cure-styled mope-rock. Another of the series' regular characters, Edward Colanderhands, appears in one episode as a member of the Cure's audience.

Another sketch on The Mary Whitehouse Experience revolved around "Ray: a man afflicted with a sarcastic tone of voice", also portrayed by Newman, and presented in the style of a medical case history. Ray's catchphrase was "oh no, what a personal disaster". In the series' final episode, Ray is given a copy of the Cure's Disintegration LP as a present, and is so overwhelmed that he can no longer speak in a sarcastic tone, and spontaneously begins speaking Flemish. In the closing scene, Ray has a chance meeting with the real Robert Smith in a cameo appearance, who punches Ray in the face and declares "oh no, what a personal disaster". Rob Newman and David Baddiel's live comedy video, History Today (1992), also features Newman's Robert Smith character, singing the children's songs "Head, Shoulders, Knees and Toes" and "I'm a Little Teapot". Smith later made another cameo in the comedy duo's spin-off series Newman and Baddiel in Pieces (1993). In a scene where David Baddiel fantasizes about his own funeral, Smith appears graveside, saying: "I've never been this miserable. I always preferred him to the other one" before leading a conga of mourners in party-hats around the graveyard.

=== Career Girls (1997) ===
Mike Leigh's 1997 film Career Girls depicts the reunion of two women who formerly shared both a flat and a love of the Cure as teenagers in the 1980s, featuring the band's music and imagery throughout. Smith was invited by Leigh to the premiere, which Smith described as "one of the weirdest afternoons of my life ... There's one bit in the film when they see a poster for 'The 13th', the first single from the last album, and she says to her friend, 'Are they still releasing records?' And I thought that was really unfair -'The unchanging man in the changing world.'"

=== South Park: Mecha-Streisand (1998) ===
In 1998, Smith voiced an animated version of himself in "Mecha-Streisand", an episode of South Park, in which he battles "Mecha Barbra Streisand" in "a battle of Godzilla vs. Mothra scale" that completely destroys the town of South Park. Streisand is portrayed as a "calculating, self-centered, egotistical bitch" who wants to conquer the world with an ancient artifact accidentally discovered by Eric Cartman, known as the "Diamond of Pantheos". After film critic Leonard Maltin and actor Sidney Poitier transform into kaiju creatures (based on Ultraman and Gamera, respectively) to battle Mecha-Streisand, yet ultimately fail to defeat the beast, Robert Smith enters, confident he can defeat Mecha-Streisand, with the help of the boys. To battle Mecha-Streisand, the boys help Smith transform into "Smithra", who has the ability of "robot punch", and ultimately defeats the monster by taking it by the tail and hurling it into space. He offers to "roshambo" Cartman to get his Walkie-Talkie back, and immediately kicks Cartman in the groin, causing him to drop the walkie-talkie. At the end of the episode, as Smith walks off into the sunset, Kyle Broflovski calls out, "Disintegration is the best album ever!" and Cartman adds, "Robert Smith kicks ass!" To date, he is one of only a few celebrities to be portrayed in a universally positive way on the show.

At the time, the episode brought South Park its highest ratings to date, with approximately 3,208,000 viewers; about 40,000 more than tuned into ABC's Prime Time Live. Comedy Central's debut screening in February 1998 marked the first time a cable station had beaten one of the Big Three television networks during prime time viewing, and "Robert Smith Kicks Ass" T-shirts were reportedly "doing a healthy trade among Cure fans" soon afterwards. Smith later described the impact of the episode on his nieces and nephews to Q magazine: "Being in South Park has made a huge impact on their lives. Now that I'm a cartoon character I'm fully accepted into their world." He told Belgian magazine Humo:

When my nephews had seen that, they worshipped me, but [kept] asking: What is a disintegration, uncle Bob? I simply answered it was something I had made a long time ago. Still funny how everything I do – travel, experiencing so many things, having interesting meetings, making good-selling records – means nothing to them while since my appearance in South Park I'm immortal and famous to them .... Bastards.

Interviewed by Placebo's Brian Molko for Les Inrockuptibles magazine, Smith said that South Park creators Trey Parker and Matt Stone sent him the script, but deliberately left some portions blank "to keep the surprise". He said, "They didn't want anybody to know, they wanted to shock. When I saw myself, I found it surrealistic." In another interview set up by Entertainment Weekly, Smith told Fall Out Boy bassist Pete Wentz that the "Disintegration is the best album ever!" scene was one of his "greatest moments in life" and described the process:

I stayed up all night and went into this radio station and recorded my words down a phone line. I had no idea what it was all about. I had one of them on the other end of the line directing me, saying, "Please sound more like Robert Smith. Come on!" About six months later I saw it and I was completely thrown by what they had done with it.

=== The Mighty Boosh: Nanageddon (2004) ===
In 2004, in an episode of the BBC surreal comedy series The Mighty Boosh, "Nanageddon" (Series 2, episode 11), the character Vince Noir offers Howard Moon the opportunity to spend the evening with two goth girls, on the condition that he dresses like a goth. Vince produces a can of "Goth Juice", described as "the most powerful hairspray known to man, made from the tears of Robert Smith". In the same episode, the Moon sings "The Love Cats" over the credits. On the same night that Smith was presented with the Godlike Genius Award by Tim Burton at the Shockwaves NME Awards, The Mighty Boosh also won "Best TV Comedy". Asked by NME.com backstage after the ceremony if there were any plans for more pop-star cameos in The Mighty Boosh, series co-creator and co-star Noel Fielding replied, "We're trying to get hold of Robert Smith for the film – I want him to be my uncle. That would be great!"

=== This Must Be the Place (2011) ===
The look of Cheyenne (played by Sean Penn), the main character in director Paolo Sorrentino's 2011 film This Must Be the Place, is inspired by Smith's appearance.

== Personal life ==
=== Marriage ===
Smith met Mary Theresa Poole in drama class at St Wilfrid's when they were both around 14 years old, and they were married at Worth Abbey on 13 August 1988. They have 25 nieces and nephews but have remained voluntarily childless, with Smith espousing the antinatalist view that he not only objects to having been born himself but refuses to impose life on another. He also "does not feel responsible enough to bring a child into the world".

Smith has said that Mary did not always share his confidence and vision for the Cure's future early in his musical career, which he used as significant motivation to ensure the band was successful. It has been reported by the Daily Express that she used to be a model and worked as a nurse with intellectually disabled children, but gave up her job so that the couple would not have to spend so much time apart as the Cure became more financially successful during the mid-1980s. He told The Face in 1985 that he had once accidentally left a video camera running in their home: "After a couple of hours you forget that it's on and I was quite horrified at the amount of rubbish we say to each other. It's like listening to mental people [...] I feel more natural in the company of people who are mentally unbalanced because you're always more alert, wondering what they're going to do next." He added that Mary used to dress as a witch to scare children, that she sometimes dressed up as him, and that he could never take people home as he did not know "who [would] answer the door".

While the Cure was recording Wish at Shipton Manor between 1991 and 1992, among the objects pinned to the wall was "Mary's Manor Mad Chart", listing 17 members of the Manor's staff and residents (including the Cure and their entourage) "in order of instability". Mary was ranked in second place after a kitchen worker named Louise. Smith said of this time, "We all voted and we had an award night. It was very moving."

=== Family ===
Smith had an older brother named Richard, and has an older sister named Margaret, and a younger sister named Janet. He has said that he is significantly younger than Richard and Margaret because his mother "wasn't supposed to have" him: "And once [my parents] got me, they didn't like the idea of having an only child, so they had my sister. Which is good, because I would have hated not having a younger sister." He has described Janet as a "piano prodigy" and "the family's musical genius" who was too shy to become a performer herself. As well as participating in the Crawley Goat Band since around 1973, Janet played keyboards for Cult Hero in 1979, to which Margaret contributed backing vocals. Janet, together with Simon Gallup's then-girlfriend Carol (both dressed as schoolgirls) with real-life schoolboy band the Obtainers, sang backing vocals for Cult Hero at the Marquee Club as the opening act for the Passions in March 1980.

The Cure's in-house design company Parched Art created the album cover for the Cure's The Head on the Door using a manipulated photograph of Janet taken by the band's guitarist and album cover artist Pearl Thompson. Janet had known Thompson since they were children, and the pair began dating during his early tenure as lead guitarist for Malice and the Easy Cure. During the mid-1980s, Janet gave up a professional career as a pianist to spend more time with Thompson and the Cure, and the couple were married in March 1988, making Smith and Thompson brothers-in-law until the couple divorced in 2000. Janet is also credited with having taught Smith's guitar technician Perry Bamonte to play piano while the band were recording Kiss Me, Kiss Me, Kiss Me, prior to Bamonte joining the group as keyboardist in 1990. According to Bamonte, "With the patience of a saint, she spent a month teaching me the rudiments of playing piano. Before this, I knew nothing."

During a concert at Tauron Arena Kraków on 20 October 2022, the Cure dedicated their song "I Can Never Say Goodbye" to Richard, who had recently died.

=== Views ===
Smith is uncomfortable giving interviews and talking to strangers, expressing a desire to avoid both where possible. He has multiple social media profiles, which he uses solely to share news about his work and prevent people from following accounts pretending to be him.

In 2011, Smith described himself as "a liberal kind of guy," but "uncomfortable with politicised musicians". He told Rolling Stone in 2019, "I've always held what could be considered a socialist viewpoint on the world. I think right of centre is always wrong, and that's as political as I get in public." He has openly expressed disdain for the British royal family, lamenting how musicians he respects have accepted British honours while stating that he would rather "cut off [his] own hands", as well as sporting a "citizens, not subjects" slogan on his guitar during a tour in 2012 and 2013.

In 2024, Smith signed an open letter criticizing the use of artificial intelligence in music.

== Discography ==
With the Cure

With Cult Hero

- "I'm a Cult Hero" single (1979)

With the Glove

- Blue Sunshine (1983)

With Siouxsie and the Banshees

- Nocturne (1983)
- Hyæna (1984)

As solo artist

- "Very Good Advice" (2010) Sammy Fain and Bob Hilliard cover, from Almost Alice
- "Small Hours" (2011) John Martyn cover, from the Johnny Boy Would Love This tribute album
- "Witchcraft" (2012) Cy Coleman and Carolyn Leigh cover, from Frankenweenie Unleashed!
- "C Moon" (2014) Wings cover, bonus from The Art of McCartney
- "There's a Girl in the Corner" (2015) The Twilight Sad cover, from a split single

Collaborations

Release	Year	Collaborator	Comment
The Affectionate Punch	1980	The Associates	Backing vocals on "The Affectionate Punch" and "Even Dogs in the Wild"
"Yeh Yeh Yeh" and "Lifeblood" (split single)	1980	The Magspies/The Obtainers	Producer
"Frame One" (single)	1982	Animation	Producer
From Under the Hill	1982	And Also the Trees	Co-producer
Torment and Toreros	1983	Marc and the Mambas	Smith co-wrote the song "Torment" with Marc Almond and Steve Severin
"I Want to Be a Tree" single	1984	Tim Pope	
The Pear Tree EP	1989	And Also the Trees	Smith and Mark Saunders co-produced the remixes; one of which also appears on some CD editions of the Farewell to the Shade album
"Jewel" single	1993	The Cranes	Smith remixed and played on the single versions
The Stranglers and Friends – Live in Concert	1995	The Stranglers	Guitar on "Get a Grip" and "Hanging Around". Recorded 1979
"A Sign From God" single	1998	COGASM	From the Orgazmo soundtrack
Ulysses (Della Notte)	2000	Reeves Gabrels	Vocals and other instruments on the track "Yesterday's Gone"
Radio JXL: A Broadcast from the Computer Hell Cabin	2003	Junkie XL	Vocals on the track "Perfect Blue Sky"
Blink-182	2003	Blink-182	Vocals on the track "All of This"
Zig Zag	2003	Earl Slick	Vocals on the track "Believe"
Monument	2004	Blank & Jones	Vocals on the cover version of "A Forest", previously releases as a single in 2003.
Trust It	2004	Junior Jack	Vocals on the track "Da Hype", previously releases as a single in 2003.
2 a.m. Wakeup Call	2004	Tweaker	Vocals on the track "Truth Is"
TheFutureEmbrace	2005	Billy Corgan	Backing vocals on the cover version of "To Love Somebody"
To All New Arrivals	2006	Faithless	Vocals on the track "Spiders, Crocodiles & Kryptonite"
The Ideal Condition	2007	Paul Hartnoll	Vocals on the track "Please", previously released as a single.
MTV Unplugged: Korn	2007	KoRn	Vocals on the track "Make Me Bad/In Between Days"
We Were Exploding Anyway	2010	65daysofstatic	Vocals on the track "Come To Me"
"J'aurai tout essayé" single	2010	Anik Jean	Vocal duet
"Not in Love" single	2010	Crystal Castles	Vocals
Controlling Your Allegiance	2011	The Japanese Popstars	Vocals on the track "Take Forever"
"It Never Was the Same" single	2015	The Twilight Sad	Vocals on the cover version of There's a Girl in the Corner
Song Machine, Season One: Strange Timez	2020	Gorillaz	Featured vocals, guitar, keyboards, bass guitar, and music box on the track "Strange Timez", previously released as a single.
Screen Violence	2021	Chvrches	Vocal duet on "How Not to Drown"
Goodnight, God Bless, I Love U, Delete.	2023	Crosses	Featured vocals on "Girls Float † Boys Cry"
You Seem Pretty Sad for a Girl So in Love	2026	Olivia Rodrigo	Vocals on the track "What's Wrong with Me"
Foreign Tongues	2026	The Rolling Stones	Electric guitar on "Divine Intervention", background vocals and synthesizers on "Never Wanna Lose You"

== See also ==
- List of atheists in music
- List of British Grammy winners and nominees
