= Like an Animal =

Like an Animal may refer to

- "Like an Animal" (The Glove song), 1983
- "Like an Animal" (Rüfüs song), 2015
- "Like an Animal" (Piqued Jacks song), 2023
