= Paul Hartnoll =

English electronic musician (born 1968)

- Born: 19 May 1968 (age 58); Dartford, Kent, England
- Origin: Sevenoaks, England
- Genres: Electronic, techno
- Occupations: Musician, songwriter, guitarist, singer
- Instruments: Guitar, synthesizer, vocals
- Years active: Mid-1980s–present
- Label: ACP Recordings
- Website: PaulHartnoll.com

Paul Hartnoll (born 19 May 1968) is one of two brothers (the other being Phil Hartnoll) who make up the electronic dance act Orbital.

== History ==
Hartnoll played in a local band during the mid-1980s, Noddy and the Satellites, featuring avant-garde clarinetist Duncan Walker. In 1987, Paul and his brother Phil began recording under the name Orbital with keyboards, a drum machine and a 4-track. Hartnoll's first brush with fame came when Orbital appeared on Top of the Pops on 22 March 1990. Speaking to The Guardian in December 2013 he explained this was a long way from his Sevenoaks roots. "A week before I was saying to the boss in the pizza place I was working, 'Ah I've just seen next week's rota. I can't do Wednesday because I'm doing Top of the Pops' … It felt a bit like some kind of elfin quest. Leaving my safe little job was like leaving the shire."

He made a guest appearance on ER in 2002, in the role of a DJ.

Orbital split up in 2004, after producing seven albums and developing a reputation for the high quality of their live shows. Paul then worked towards the release of his first solo album, titled The Ideal Condition, which was released on 28 May 2007. In 2009 Orbital reformed and began performing live again.

Hartnoll, wishing to produce something different from Orbital's output, wrote The Ideal Condition with a more acoustic focus, in comparison to the electronic nature of most of his previous work. Arranger Chris Elliott helped Hartnoll to move the album in this direction, taking music that Orbital would have produced electronically, and having it played by a union-full orchestra. People who are featured collaborating on The Ideal Condition were Robert Smith, Joseph Arthur, Lianne Hall, and Akayzia Parker.

In 2018, Hartnoll released Heartwork, a solo track recorded in collaboration with the British Heart Foundation and British cycling retailer Evans Cycles. The experimental track used heartbeat data from UK cyclists, and was created to highlight the benefits that cycling to work can have on heart health. Hartnoll also used sounds from his own bicycle to record the track.

He lives in Brighton.

Hartnoll is on the autism spectrum.

== Hartnoll & Young ==
In 2021, Hartnoll teamed up with British poet Murray Lachlan Young for a lockdown inspired album called The Virus Diaries under the name Hartnoll & Young. In June 2021, the pair released a single from the album called "Garden Centre (Push the Trolley)" as a follow-up to "I Need a Haircut".

== Discography ==
=== Solo albums ===
- The Ideal Condition (2007)
- 8:58 (2015)
- Concrete Plans (Original Motion Picture Soundtrack) (2021)

=== Solo singles ===
- "Patchwork Guilt" / "Gloopy" (2006)
- "Please" (2007)
- "Gob Smack" (2008)

=== Haunted House ===
Collaboration with Lianne Hall.

- Brave the Woods (2014)

=== American Ultra ===
American Ultra (2015) is a film about capable but unwitting operatives (also stoners), defending themselves against a rogue chief. Paul Hartnoll contributed music.

=== Wipeout Pure Soundtrack ===
(2005) Video game where players race futuristic hover vehicles around a track. Paul Hartnoll contributed music.

- "Boot Up"
- "Ignition"
