= 8:58 =

Studio album by 8:58
- Released: March 30, 2015
- Genres: Techno, ambient
- Length: 48:53
- Label: ACP Recordings
- Producer: Flood

8:58 chronology
Wonky (2012)	8:58 (2015)

Singles from 8:58
- 1. "8:58" Released: 17 October 2014; 2. "The Clock" Released: 30 March 2015

Professional ratings
Review scores
Source	Rating
The Arts Desk	4/5 stars
musicOMH	3.5/5 stars

8:58 is the debut album of Paul Hartnoll's 8:58 project, released on March 30, 2015. According to Hartnoll, the album is a continuation of his work with Orbital. The album features contributions from actor Cillian Murphy, folk band The Unthanks, singer-songwriter Ed Harcourt, Lisa Knapp, Robert Smith, Lianne Hall and Fable.

The song "Please" is a reworking of the track of the same name from Paul Hartnoll's 2007 solo album, The Ideal Condition, and was previously released under the title "Please (Remember 1992?) (PH Mix)". The track "A Forest" is a cover of The Cure's track of the same name.

== Track listing ==
All music is composed by Paul Hartnoll, except "A Forest" written by Gallup, Hartley, Smith, Tolhurst.

No.	Title	Length
1.	"8:58" (featuring Cillian Murphy)	6:05
2.	"Please" (featuring Robert Smith & Lianne Hall)	6:35
3.	"The Past Now" (featuring Lisa Knapp)	6:36
4.	"Villain" (featuring Ed Harcourt)	3:51
5.	"The Clock" (featuring Cillian Murphy)	3:09
6.	"A Forest" (featuring The Unthanks)	5:43
7.	"Broken Up"	4:21
8.	"Nearly There"	5:02
9.	"Cemetery" (featuring Fable)	7:37

Deluxe edition
No.	Title	Length
1.	"8:58" (instrumental)	6:27
2.	"Please" (instrumental)	4:58
3.	"The Past Now" (instrumental)	6:35
4.	"Villain" (instrumental)	3:50
5.	"The Clock" (instrumental)	3:05
6.	"A Forest" (instrumental)	5:33
7.	"Broken Up"	4:20
8.	"Nearly There"	5:01
9.	"Cemetery" (instrumental)	7:36
10.	"Risky"	5:52
