= Wings of Joy =

Studio album by Cranes
- Released: 16 September 1991
- Studio: First Protocol (London)
- Genre: Dream pop; neo-psychedelia; art rock; gothic rock; shoegaze
- Length: 44:09
- Label: Dedicated
- Producer: Cranes

Cranes chronology
Self-Non-Self (1989)	Wings of Joy (1991)	Forever (1993)

Singles from Wings of Joy
- 1. "Adoration" Released: 13 May 1991; 2. "Tomorrow's Tears" Released: 26 August 1991

Wings of Joy is the debut studio album by English rock band Cranes. The album was released on 16 September 1991 by Dedicated Records. It followed the band's mini-album Self-Non-Self, released two years earlier.

== Critical reception ==
Professional ratings
Review scores
Source	Rating
AllMusic	4.5/5 stars
Chicago Tribune	3/4 stars
Los Angeles Times	3/4 stars
NME	7/10
The Philadelphia Inquirer	3.5/4 stars
Q	3/5 stars
Rolling Stone	4/5 stars
Select	4/5
Vox	8/10

The Washington Post determined that "the Cranes' balladeering may be a little bland, and even irksome when A. Shaw's voice is at its most little-girlish, but it's actually more appealing than the group's harder side".

Ned Raggett of AllMusic called Wings of Joy "a beautiful, if unsettling, piece of work" and found that in comparison to Cranes' earlier work, "the gripping, chilling atmosphere that Cranes dwell in hasn't moved an inch, but in terms of approach ... the quartet has continued to expand its palette."

In 2026, Uncut ranked Wings of Joy at number 156 in their list of "The 200 Greatest Goth Albums", believing it to represent a key crossover for the "art-rock space" between goth and shoegaze, further describing the album as "crepuscular chamber minimalism in multi-dimensional sonics."

== Track listing ==
All lyrics are written by Alison Shaw; all music is composed by Jim Shaw.

No.	Title	Length
1.	"Watersong"	3:51
2.	"Thursday"	4:23
3.	"Living and Breathing"	3:30
4.	"Leaves of Summer"	3:44
5.	"Starblood"	3:35
6.	"Sixth of May"	4:39
7.	"Wish"	3:58
8.	"Tomorrow's Tears"	3:59
9.	"Beautiful Sadness"	4:04
10.	"Hopes Are High"	2:59
11.	"Adoration"	5:27
Total length:		44:09

UK limited CD edition bonus disc
No.	Title	Length
1.	"Inescapable"	2:45
2.	"Dada 331"	3:11
3.	"I Hope"	4:00
4.	"E.G. Shining"	3:46
Total length:		13:42

UK limited LP edition bonus disc
No.	Title	Length
1.	"Starblood" (remix)	3:38
2.	"Fuse" (original version)	3:32
3.	"Self Non Self"	2:15
Total length:		9:25

== Personnel ==
Credits are adapted from the album's liner notes.

Cranes

- Matt Cope – guitar
- Mark Francombe – guitar
- Alison Shaw – vocals, bass
- Jim Shaw – drums, guitar, piano

Production

- Cranes – production
- Gail Lambourne – engineering

Design

- Robert Coleman – design

== Charts ==
Chart (1991)	Peak position
UK Albums (OCC)	52
UK Independent Albums (OCC)	4
