= Punish Me with Kisses =

Single by the Glove

from the album Blue Sunshine
- B-side: "The Tightrope"
- Released: 18 November 1983
- Genre: Post-punk; gothic rock; alternative rock
- Length: 3:12
- Label: Wonderland; Polydor
- Songwriters: Robert Smith; Steven Severin
- Producers: Robert Smith; Steven Severin; Mike Hedges

The Glove singles chronology
"Like an Animal" (1983)	"Punish Me with Kisses" (1983)

"Punish Me with Kisses" is the second single by the English post-punk band the Glove from their sole studio album Blue Sunshine. released in 1983 by Wonderland Records/Polydor. The Glove were a side project for Robert Smith of the Cure and Steven Severin of Siouxsie and the Banshees. The song was recorded in 1983 while Smith was also a member of the Banshees, and also featured future Banshees keyboardist Martin McCarrick and new Cure drummer Andy Anderson.

The band performed the song on the British TV show Riverside.

The release of the single went largely unnoticed at the time, because both the Cure and the Banshees had just released their most successful singles to date.

The song was co-written by Smith and Severin.

The artwork was created by the record sleeve design company Da Gama.

== Critical reception ==
In a review for the Blue Sunshine album for the Spanish-language magazine Muzikalia, critic Manuel Pinazo described this song and "Like an Animal" as having echoes of Syd Barrett., while Toronto Star, critic Ben Rayner described the song as a "more straightforward post-punk cut". In a review of the 2006 reissue of the Blue Sunshine album, which included a remix of the song, PopMatters editor Adam Besenyodi said that the depth of the album version "is lost on the Mike Hedges mix, where the full orchestration is supplanted with a tinnier sound".

== Track listing ==
=== 7" ===
1. "Punish Me with Kisses" (Mike Hedges Mix) – 3:30
2. "The Tightrope" – 3:12

== Personnel ==
- Steven Severin – bass
- Robert Smith – guitar
- Jeanette Landray – vocals
- Martin McCarrick – keyboards, strings
- Ginny Hewes – strings
- Anne Stephenson – strings
- Andy Anderson – drums
