= The Ideal Condition =

Studio album by Paul Hartnoll
- Released: 28 May 2007
- Genre: Electronica, 21st-century classical music
- Label: ACP Recordings
- Producer: Paul Hartnoll, Chris Elliott

Paul Hartnoll chronology
Blue Album (2004)	''The Ideal Condition'' (2007)	Wonky (2012)

Singles from The Ideal Condition
- 1. "Patchwork Guilt" Released: 11 December 2006; 2. "Please" Released: 7 May 2007

Professional ratings
Review scores
Source	Rating
musicOMH	4/5 stars
The Guardian	4/5 stars

The Ideal Condition is the first solo album from Paul Hartnoll who, along with his brother Phil, formed the electronic band Orbital.

The album was released on May 28, 2007 and features vocals from Cure frontman Robert Smith ("Please"), The Metro Voices Choir, Joseph Arthur ("Aggro"), Lianne Hall ("For Silence") and Akayzia Parker ("Nothing Else Matters"). The track "Please" was later reworked for the album 8:58, Paul Hartnoll's new project.

== Track listing ==
All tracks are written by Paul Hartnoll, except where noted

No.	Title	Length
1.	"Haven't We Met Before?"	4:26
2.	"For Silence" (featuring Lianne Hall)	4:03
3.	"Simple Sounds"	4:55
4.	"Please" (featuring Robert Smith and Lianne Hall)	4:04
5.	"The Unsteady Waltz"	4:30
6.	"Nothing Else Matters" (featuring Akayzia Parker)	4:09
7.	"Patchwork Guilt"	4:48
8.	"Aggro" (featuring Joseph Arthur)	4:20
9.	"Dust Motes"	5:22

== Appearances in other media ==
"For Silence" was featured in the Xbox Live Arcade, PlayStation Network, and PC game Chime.
