= Population Four =

Studio album by Cranes
- Released: 1997
- Genres: Pop, rock
- Label: Dedicated
- Producer: Mark Freegard

Cranes chronology
Ancienne Belgique (1996)	Population Four (1997)	EP Collection Volumes 1 & 2 (1997)

Population Four is an album by the English band Cranes, released in 1997. They supported it with a North American tour. Population Four peaked at No. 90 on the UK Albums Chart.

== Production ==
The album was produced by Mark Freegard. Jim Shaw sang lead on "Stalk", the first time on a Cranes album that he had taken the lead vocal. He took over guitar duties after the departure of Matt Cope. "Can't Get Free" is about a woman who is unable to completely quit a romantic relationship.

== Critical reception ==
Professional ratings
Review scores
Source	Rating
AllMusic	4/5 stars
The Boston Phoenix	2.5/4 stars
The Encyclopedia of Popular Music	3/5 stars
The Great Indie Discography	4/10
Jackson Citizen Patriot	3.5/5 stars
MusicHound Rock: The Essential Album Guide	3.5/5 stars
The Press	2/5 stars

The Gazette said, "It takes a certain chutzpah to sing pop with a helium voice, and [Alison] Shaw's is an acquired taste. Her band compensates by working dynamics into its guitar washes, making this rainy-day wallpaper with a variety of patterns." The Hamilton Spectator opined that "Shaw's baby-doll voice has always bordered between intrigue and irritation, but it's the tendency to slide toward the latter that makes the Cranes' Population Four vastly inferior to ... Loved."

The Press concluded that the vocals and music "try to be haunting, atmospheric and memorable [but] they fail on all counts." The Philadelphia Inquirer noted that there is "enough gloomy repetition to placate the ardent faithful." The Rocket called Population Four "stark, but accessible" and said that Cranes "make music both beautiful and unsettling". The Big Takeover stated that "the band went for a more accessible and less mysterious rock and pop format".

== Track listing ==
No.	Title	Length
1.	"Tangled Up"
2.	"Fourteen"
3.	"Breeze"
4.	"Can't Get Free"
5.	"Stalk"
6.	"Sweet Unknown"
7.	"Angel Bell"
8.	"On Top of the World"
9.	"Brazil"
10.	"Let Go"
11.	"To Be"
