= Lianne Hall =

Musician

Lianne Hall (Brighton) is an English folk/electronic singer. In the late nineties she was singer with punk band Witchknot. John Peel featured Hall in his Sounds of The Suburbs, Bradford, and five Peel sessions, and described her as "one of the great English voices".

== Discography ==
=== Studio albums ===
- Trouble (2001)
- Abandon Ship (2006)
- Crossing Wires (2010)
- The Caretaker (2017)
- Energy Flashback (2022)

=== John Peel Sessions ===
- 30/04/2000 (Maida Vale 3)
- 14/10/2001 (Maida Vale 4)
- 20/12/2001 (Peel Acres)
- Abandon Ship album 2006

=== Collaborations ===
- Vocals on "For Silence" from the album The Ideal Condition by Paul Hartnoll.
- Backing vocals on "Please" from the album The Ideal Condition by Paul Hartnoll.
- A collaborative album with D_rradio, titled "Making Spaces".
- Backing vocals on "Please" from the album 8:58, a project by Paul Hartnoll.

==== Haunted House ====
Collaboration with Paul Hartnoll.

- "Brave The Woods" (2014)
