= Cranes (band) =

British rock band

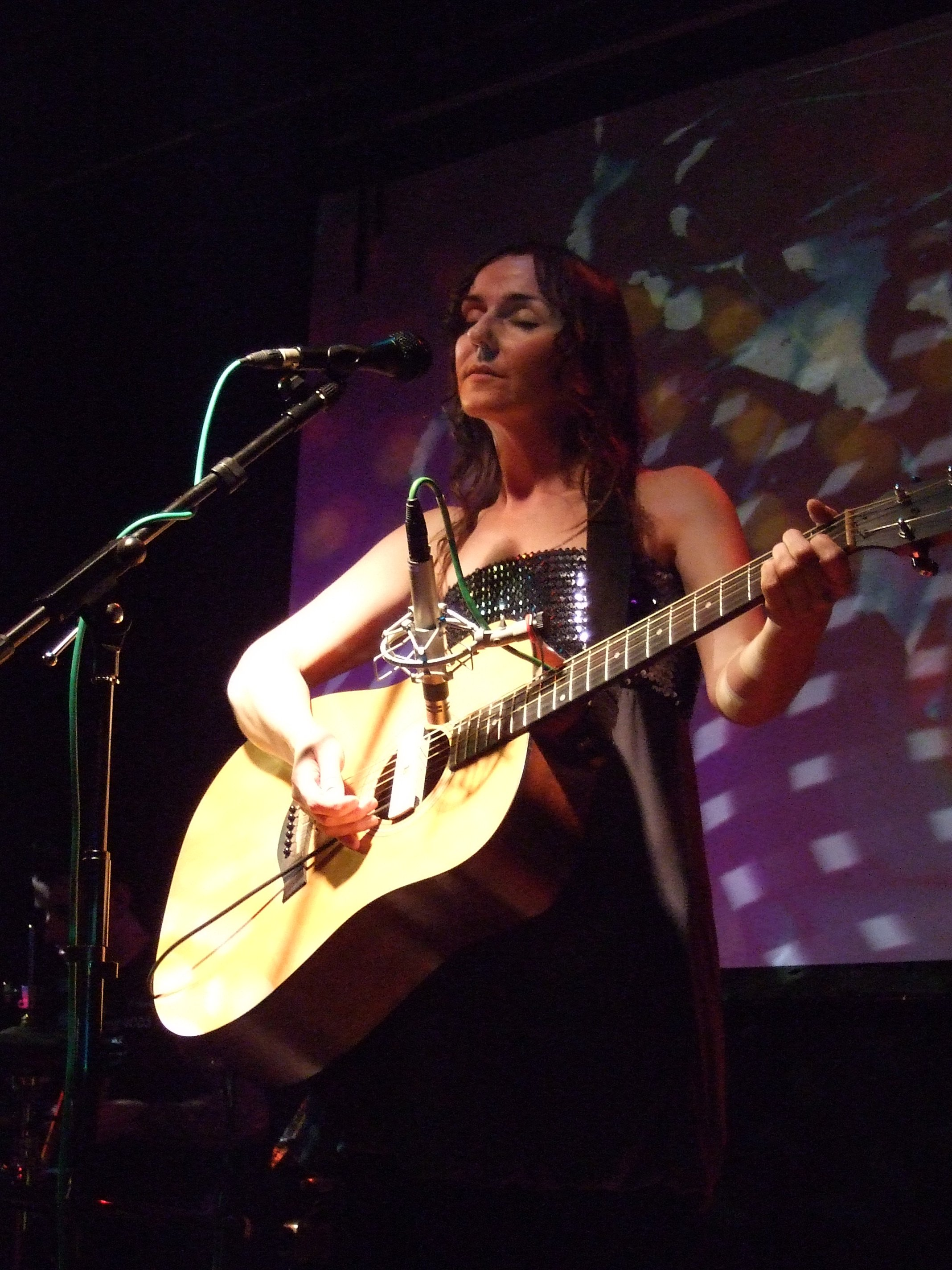
- Cranes singer Alison Shaw

Background information
- Origin: Portsmouth, England
- Genres: Dream pop, ethereal wave, gothic rock, indie rock, shoegaze
- Years active: 1985–1997, 2000–present
- Labels: Arista Records; Bite Back! BMG Records; Dadaphonic; Dedicated Records; RCA Records
- Members: Alison Shaw; Jim Shaw; Mark Francombe; Paul Smith
- Past members: Ben Baxter; Jon Callender; Jon Mattock; Kevin Dunford; Manu Ross; Matt Cope; Simon Tufnal

Cranes are a British rock band, perhaps best known for the childlike vocals of lead singer Alison Shaw, who formed the band with her brother Jim Shaw.

== History ==
The Shaw siblings started the band in 1985, taking their name from the many mechanical cranes located around the docks in their home city of Portsmouth. After signing with local independent label Bite Back!, the band's first release was the self-financed Fuse mini-album in 1986, released only on cassette; it would take another three years before Cranes followed up with another mini-album, a 12" record called Self-Non-Self, in 1989. They recorded the first of their two sessions for John Peel's BBC Radio 1 show, which led to them becoming one of the first bands signed to the BMG offshoot label Dedicated Records in 1990. After the addition of two guitarists, Mark Francombe and Matt Cope, Cranes were featured on the front cover of Melody Maker magazine, and went on to release a series of critically acclaimed singles and EPs through 1990 and 1991. Their first full-length album, Wings of Joy, reached #52 on the UK Albums Chart.

Following a world tour with the Cure in 1992, the band's popularity increased, and peaked with the release of their second album, Forever (UK #40), in 1993. Continuing with the subtle, gradual softening of their sound, the album introduced elements of pop music, resulting in their two biggest hits: though not officially released as a single, the album's opening track, "Everywhere", received a heavy amount of airplay on alternative radio stations in the US, while the second single, "Jewel", was buoyed to #29 in the UK after being remixed by Robert Smith. Another album, Loved, was released in 1994, after which Matt Cope left the band. Working as a duo, the siblings recorded an album inspired by the Jean-Paul Sartre play Les Mouches; called La Tragédie d'Oreste et Électre, the album was initially given a limited-edition release in 1996. Cope was eventually replaced by drummer Manu Ross, which allowed Jim Shaw to move to guitar for live performances, and this lineup released the fifth Cranes album, Population Four, in 1997.

Following the 1998 closure of Dedicated, the group went on an indefinite hiatus, and functionally disbanded. In 2000, the Shaws began writing music again, assembled a new lineup, and set up their own label, Dadaphonic, which released the album Future Songs in 2001. Cranes again supported The Cure in 2002, at Hyde Park and at several European festivals. Two more albums have been released on Dadaphonic: Particles and Waves in 2004, and a self-titled album in 2008. These albums have signified a change in the overall style of their music, heading in a more electronic direction and emphasising its ambient, ethereal qualities, while continuing to showcase Alison Shaw's distinctive voice.

Cranes reformed in 2023 for their first live shows in eleven years, and also played a handful of shows in 2024. They have recently overseen the reissues of early and archival recordings, including a compilation of their two John Peel sessions from 1989 and 1990, as well as albums that had never been released on vinyl before. Their ninth album Fuse was released on 5 April 2024 via their own music label Dadaphonic.

== Musical style ==
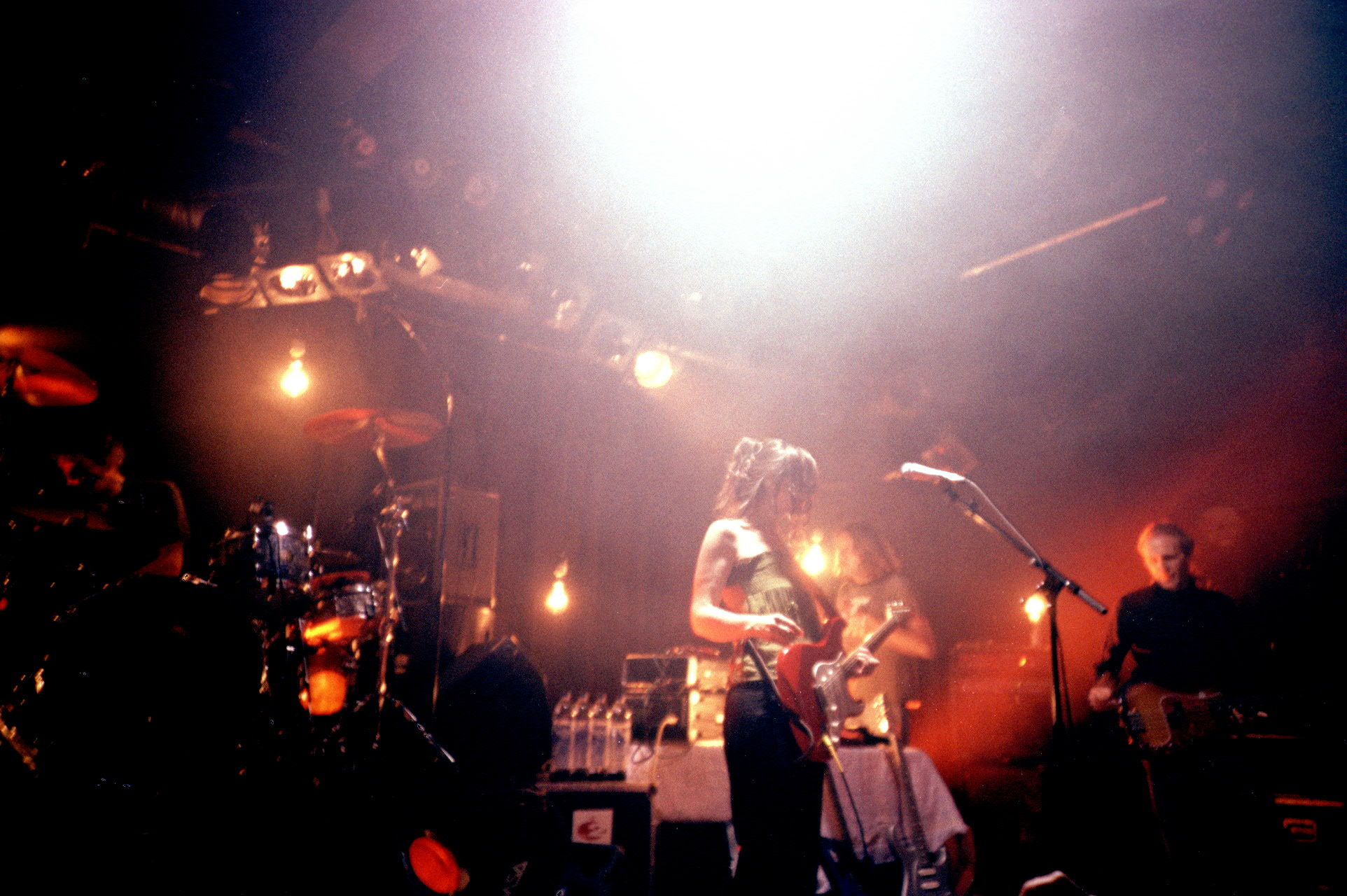
Cranes performing live

The band's music has been described as "gothic minimalism", although the band have disputed the "gothic" label. In the early 1990s, they were briefly included as part of the shoegazing movement of the era. They have also been described as dream pop.

“The Cranes have been tagged with more than their share of inaccurate labels over the years, such as "Gothic", "Ethereal" and even "Industrial", but just as often, they are more accurately described as a band with a furiously creative drive which allows even their simplest songs to sound beautifully honest and original. But as simple as their music seems, the Cranes have always kept things interesting by giving their music an element of edginess and unpredictability. Some of their songs make their point with no more than three notes played repeatedly on a piano, while others rely on screeching, wailing walls of sound provided by guitarists Matt Cope and Mark Francombe, while still others rely on a clever, sometimes surprising combination of the two. All of these elements are complemented perfectly by Shaw's unmistakable vocal style and her brother Jim Shaw's precise and powerful percussion.”

— Andy Dolan, The Michigan Daily, 1995

Much has been made of Alison Shaw's vocals, with descriptions ranging from "the helium tones of a small child", "baby-doll-voiced", and "a mewling, childish wisp of a voice". One reviewer described the band thusly: "Imagine a small child singing lullabies at the bottom of the well with a background of grinding guitars".

== Band members ==
Current members

- Alison Shaw – vocals, bass guitar, acoustic guitar (1985–1997, 2000–present)
- Jim Shaw – guitar, bass guitar, keyboards, drums (1985–1997, 2000–present)
- Paul Smith – guitar, keyboards (1995–1997, 2000–present)
- Ben Baxter – bass guitar (2000–present)
- Jon Mattock – drums (2008–present)

Former members

- Kevin Dunford – lead guitar (1988–1989)
- Mark Francombe – guitar, bass guitar, keyboards, spanner (1989–1997)
- Matt Cope – guitar (1989–1997)
- Manu Ross – drums (1996–1997)
- Jon Callender – drums (2000–2007)

== Discography ==
=== Albums and mini-albums ===
- Fuse (1986, Bite Back!)
- Self-Non-Self (1989, Bite Back!)
- Wings of Joy (1991, Dedicated Records/RCA Records)
- Forever (1993, Dedicated/RCA)
- Loved (1994, Dedicated/Arista Records)
- La Tragédie d'Oreste et Électre (1996, Dedicated)
- Population Four (1997, Dedicated/Arista)
- Future Songs (2001, Dadaphonic)
- Particles & Waves (2004, Dadaphonic)
- Cranes (2008, Dadaphonic)
- Fuse (2024, Dadaphonic)

=== Live albums ===
- Live in Italy (2003, Dadaphonic)
- Live at Amsterdam Paradiso 22.02.91 (2006, Dadaphonic)

=== Compilations ===
- Forever Remixes (1993, Dedicated)
- EP Collection Volumes 1 & 2 (1997, Dedicated)
- John Peel Sessions 1989-1990 (2023, Dadaphonic)

=== Singles and EPs ===
- "Inescapable" (1990, Dedicated)
- Espero EP (1990, Dedicated)
- "Adoration" (1991, Dedicated)
- "Tomorrow's Tears" (1991, Dedicated/RCA)
- "Adrift" (1993, Dedicated)
- "Clear" (1993, Dedicated/RCA)
- "Jewel" (1993, Dedicated/RCA)
- "Shining Road" (1994, Dedicated/Arista)
- "Beautiful Friend" (1994, Arista)
- "Lilies" (1995, Arista)
- Ancienne Belgique EP (1996, Dedicated)
- "Can't Get Free" (1997, Dedicated)
- "Future Song" (2001, Dadaphonic)
- "Submarine" (2002, Dadaphonic)
- "The Moon City (Demo Version)" (2002, Elefant Records)

== Notes ==
- Cranes' first recorded appearance was a track called "Vegetate" for a cassette compilation album called Against the Tide, released by Bite Back! in 1986.
- "Nothing in the Middle, Nothing in the End" first appeared on another Bite Back! compilation, Make Ready for Revelation, in 1987.
- Cranes contributed a demo of "Cha Cha Escueta" which was released on the Melody Maker cassette compilation Gigantic 2 in 1990, although the track is simply named "Untitled" on the sleeve.
- Alison Shaw also participated in a short-lived collaboration called Inrain with Rudi Tambala of AR Kane, which resulted in a single called "Grow", released as part of the Rough Trade Singles Club in 1991. The album Rise was released on May 23rd 2026 on vinyl and streaming
- "Shining Road" was used in the 1996 film Eye for an Eye.
- "Astronauts" (from Particles and Waves) was used in an American Express commercial with actress Kate Winslet in 2005.
- Alison Shaw provided vocals on the track "Endormie" for the American group Twine on their 2008 album, Violets.
- "Don't Wake Me Up" (from Future Songs) was used in a 2011 episode of the television series Californication.
- "Shining Road", "Beautiful Friend" and "Trumpet Song" were used in the 1996 short film Scarborough Ahoy.
