= Blue Dancers =

Pastel by Edgar Degas

- Artist: Edgar Degas
- Year: c. 1898
- Medium: Pastel on paper
- Movement: Impressionism
- Dimensions: 65 cm × 65 cm (26 in × 26 in)
- Location: Pushkin Museum, Moscow

Blue Dancers (French: Les Danseuses bleues) is a c. 1898 pastel by Edgar Degas. It is held in the Pushkin Museum, in Moscow, which it entered in 1948 from the State Museum of Modern Western Art. It was in Durand-Ruel's collection and then until 1918 in Sergei Shchukin's collection in Moscow.

== Description and analysis ==
The work stands out for its extremely elegant compositional balance. The pastel depicts, in a close-up shot, four dancers adjusting their blue-dyed ballet costumes before going on stage for the performance. Degas interprets this adjustment of clothing with theatrical cadences, staging a true ballet in which limbs, torsos, and faces turn. However, the symmetrical division of space is energized by leaving part of one of the dancers' bodies out of the frame at the bottom, making the image appear less premeditated and more casual.

Although the painting gives the impression of an accidental glimpse, Degas very clearly meditates on the compositional balances of the pastel already mentioned. Furthermore, attentive to the charcoal or pencil drawings of modern masters, the painter orchestrates a skillful interplay of shading. Layered over one another, these shadings give greater volume to the four dancers.

"He loved the human body as a material harmony, as a beautiful architecture in motion," wrote Charles Baudelaire. In this work as well, Degas allows himself broad freedom of perspective: the figures are viewed from above, thus creating a considerable spatial claustrophobia.
