= Forever (Cranes album) =

Studio album by Cranes
- Released: 26 April 1993
- Studio: First Protocol (London)
- Genre: Dream pop
- Length: 39:36
- Label: Dedicated
- Producer: Cranes

Cranes chronology
Wings of Joy (1991)	Forever (1993)	Loved (1994)

Singles from Forever
- 1. "Adrift" Released: 29 March 1993; 2. "Jewel" Released: 6 September 1993

Forever is the second studio album by English rock band Cranes. It was released on 26 April 1993 by Dedicated Records.

== Critical reception ==
Professional ratings
Review scores
Source	Rating
AllMusic	4.5/5 stars
Christgau's Consumer Guide	(2-star Honorable Mention)

Melody Maker ranked Forever as the 24th best album of 1993.

In a retrospective review for AllMusic, Ned Raggett stated that Forever saw Cranes building on the mixture of "elegant restraint" and "brusque power" that characterised their 1991 debut album Wings of Joy. He noted that Forever "went to extremes in both directions – the quieter moments were even more hushed and shadowed, the louder points all that much more whip-snap cruel."

== Track listing ==
All tracks are written by Alison Shaw and Jim Shaw

No.	Title	Length
1.	"Everywhere"	3:41
2.	"Cloudless"	5:33
3.	"Jewel"	3:05
4.	"Far Away"	3:53
5.	"Adrift"	5:09
6.	"Clear"	3:43
7.	"Sun and Sky"	3:34
8.	"And Ever"	4:04
9.	"Golden"	3:43
10.	"Rainbows"	3:11
Total length:		39:36

European edition bonus track
No.	Title	Length
11.	"Shine Like Stars"	4:32
Total length:		44:08

UK limited CD edition bonus disc
No.	Title	Length
1.	"The Puppet"	3:48
2.	"Shine Like Stars"	4:32
Total length:		8:20

UK limited LP edition and European limited CD edition bonus disc
No.	Title	Length
1.	"At Sea"	3:19
2.	"Slide"	2:50
3.	"Wings of Joy"	2:04
4.	"Trumpet Song"	1:48
Total length:		10:01

== Personnel ==
Credits are adapted from the album's liner notes.

Cranes

- Matt Cope – guitar
- Mark Francombe – guitar, keyboards
- Alison Shaw – vocals, bass
- Jim Shaw – drums, guitar, keyboards, bass

Additional musicians

- The Falseharmonics – strings on "Golden"
- Audrey Riley – string arrangements on "Golden"

Production

- Cranes – production, engineering
- Giles Hall – engineering
- Marcus Lindsay – engineering
- Andy Wilkinson – engineering

Design

- Miles Aldridge – photography
- John Barnbrook – Cranes logo design
- Albert Tupelo – design

== Charts ==
Chart (1993)	Peak position
UK Albums (OCC)	40
UK Independent Albums (OCC)	4
