= Like an Animal (The Glove song) =

Single by The Glove

from the album Blue Sunshine
- B-side: "Mouth to Mouth"
- Released: 12 August 1983
- Genre: Post-punk, gothic rock, alternative rock
- Length: 4:44
- Label: Wonderland Records/Polydor Records
- Songwriters: Robert Smith and Steven Severin
- Producers: Robert Smith; Steven Severin

The Glove singles chronology
"Like an Animal" (1983)	"Punish Me with Kisses" (1983)

"Like an Animal" is the first single by the Glove from their album Blue Sunshine, released in 1983 by Wonderland Records/Polydor. The Glove were a side project for Robert Smith of the Cure and Steven Severin of Siouxsie and the Banshees. The song was recorded in 1983 while Smith was also a member of the Banshees. The vocals on the song are provided by Jeanette Landray, a dancer and friend of members of the Banshees.

The lyrics were written by Smith and tell the true story of a woman who went mad while living in a US tower block.

The artwork was created by the record sleeve design company Da Gama.

The release of the single went largely unnoticed at the time, because both the Cure and the Banshees had recently released their most successful singles to date.

== Reception ==
In a review of the 2006 reissue of the Blue Sunshine album, which included the "Like an Animal (Club? What Club?)" remix of the song, PopMatters editor Adam Besenyodi said that the remix "remains largely unessential".

== Track listing ==
=== 7" ===
1. "Like an Animal" (4:44)
2. "Mouth to Mouth" (5:35)

=== 12" ===
1. "Like an Animal (Club? What Club?)" (6:36)
2. "Like an Animal" (4:44)
3. "Mouth to Mouth" (5:35)

== Personnel ==
- Steven Severin: bass
- Robert Smith: guitar
- Jeanette Landray: vocals
- Martin McCarrick: keyboards, strings
- Ginny Hewes: strings
- Anne Stephenson: strings
- Andy Anderson: drums
