= Blue Sunshine (album) =

Studio album by The Glove
- Released: 9 September 1983
- Recorded: 1983
- Genre: Post-punk; neo-psychedelia; new wave; dark wave; psychedelic pop
- Length: 43:10
- Label: Wonderland Records; Polydor; Rhino
- Producer: Merlin Griffiths, Robert Smith, Steven Severin

Blue Sunshine is the only studio album by the British supergroup the Glove, released in 1983 by Wonderland Records/Polydor. The album mainly served as a diversion for Robert Smith and Steven Severin when both of them were under heavy stress in their respective bands the Cure and Siouxsie and the Banshees.

The album's title, chosen by Severin, refers to the horror film of the same name, in which people who took the fictional "Blue Sunshine" variety of LSD became psychotic murderers 10 years later.

Since Smith was prohibited from singing in another band by his record company, he and Severin recruited Zoo dancer Jeanette Landray (a former girlfriend of Banshees drummer Budgie) to sing on the majority of the tracks; Smith contractually could only sing on two songs, "Mr. Alphabet Says" and "Perfect Murder".

== Background ==
The Glove were formed while Steven Severin and Robert Smith were under heavy stress in their respective bands.

Other musicians involved in this project were drummer Andy Anderson, who had just joined the Cure, multi-instrumentalist Martin McCarrick, who would later join the Banshees, and string players Ginny Hewes and Anne Stephenson, the latter had played for the Banshees on the album A Kiss in the Dreamhouse (1982).

Severin wrote the lyrics to all of the songs except "Like an Animal", "Sex-Eye-Make-Up", "Perfect Murder", which were written by Smith, and "Punish Me with Kisses", on which the two collaborated.

Severin said that he and Smith "knew we stood a good chance of a critical drubbing no matter what The Glove sounded like. Rather than play down the 'self indulgent card' we used it as our Joker! There is no artifice on this record it's just a reflection of our 'chemistry', our shared sense of humour." He also said "Mr Alphabet Says" was "conceived as 'the track that Ringo would sing' with a touch of Lennonesque spite for good measure. A rare chance for Robert to sing lyrics other than his own".

Robert Smith described the process of making the album "as some kind of 'art experiment'. Although we had a great time making it, it was completely debilitating and aged me about ten years. I think it was due to us bringing out the worst in each other -- the most excessive ideas."

== Release ==
Two singles were taken from the album, "Like an Animal" and "Punish Me with Kisses".

In 2006, the album was digitally remastered and re-released by Rhino Records, featuring a bonus disc with Smith singing vocals on studio demo versions of all the songs instead of Landray.

In 2013, the album was re-released for Record Store Day by Polydor (in Europe) and Rhino (in the US) as a limited edition of 3,500 copies (numbered on the sleeve), pressed on marbled blue vinyl and featuring none of the 2006 bonus material.

== Reception ==
Professional ratings
Review scores
Source	Rating
AllMusic	3/5 stars
Pitchfork	7.0/10
Select	4/5 medals
Stylus Magazine	A

Brendan Swift of AllMusic said the collaboration between Smith and Severin "resulted in an eccentric, and at times incompatible, mix of psychedelic sounds wrapped around alternative '80s pop." and noted "While musically diverse, the album's lyrics rarely stray from the dual themes of death and sex, furthering the gothic undertones so often heard in Smith and Severin's previous work." Swift concludes "Blue Sunshine's eclecticism makes this an interesting side note for long-time fans of the Cure and Siouxsie & the Banshees, but a somewhat more inaccessible listen for others."

Nitsuh Abebe of Pitchfork gave a positive review of the album in a review of the 2006 reissue, described the album as psychedelic pop, saying " With singer Jeanette Landray taking Siouxsie-like leads on most tracks, the sound is about what you'd expect from a Cure/Banshees crossover, or at least one entranced by Beatles psychedelia." and recommended the album to fans of both respective group, while noting its rarity.

Post-punk.com called the album "the epitome of psychedelic creativity in the same league as Piper at the Gates of Dawn, Sgt. Pepper, and Surrealistic Pillow."

== Track listing ==
All music is composed by Steven Severin and Robert Smith.

No.	Title	Lyrics	Length
1.	"Like an Animal"	Smith	4:44
2.	"Looking-Glass-Girl"	Severin	4:56
3.	"Sex-Eye-Make-Up"	Smith	4:24
4.	"Mr. Alphabet Says"	Severin	3:50
5.	"A Blues in Drag"		3:12
6.	"Punish Me with Kisses"	Severin, Smith	3:40
7.	"This Green City"	Severin	4:34
8.	"Orgy"	Severin	3:19
9.	"Perfect Murder"	Smith	4:28
10.	"Relax"		6:03

1990 bonus tracks
No.	Title	Lyrics	Length
11.	"Mouth to Mouth"	Smith	5:35
12.	"The Tightrope"		3:12
13.	"Like an Animal" (12" Club What Club? mix)	Smith	6:35

2006 CD reissue bonus tracks
No.	Title	Length
11.	"The Man from Nowhere" (Original instrumental mix)	1:46
12.	"Mouth to Mouth" (Landray vocal mix)	5:40
13.	"Punish Me with Kisses" (Mike Hedges mix)	3:30
14.	"The Tightrope" (Original instrumental mix)	3:22
15.	"Like an Animal" (12" Club What Club? mix)	5:38

2006 Deluxe Edition bonus disc
No.	Title	Length
1.	"Like an Animal" (RS Vocal Demo)	4:38
2.	"Looking-Glass-Girl" (RS Vocal Demo)	4:28
3.	"Sex-Eye-Make-Up" (RS Vocal Demo)	4:27
4.	"Mr. Alphabet Says" (Alt RS Vocal Demo)	4:06
5.	"A Blues in Drag" (Alt RS Vocal Demo)	3:11
6.	"Punish Me With Kisses" (RS Vocal Demo)	3:30
7.	"This Green City" (RS Vocal Demo)	4:31
8.	"Orgy" (RS Vocal Demo)	3:41
9.	"Perfect Murder" (Alt RS Vocal Demo)	4:04
10.	"Relax" (Alt RS Vocal Demo)	6:15
11.	"The Man from Nowhere" (Alt Instrumental Mix)	1:47
12.	"Mouth to Mouth" (RS Vocal Demo)	6:06
13.	"Opened the Box (A Waltz)" (RS Vocal Demo)	1:29
14.	"The Tightrope (Almost Time)"	3:14
15.	"And All Around Us the Mermaids Sang (aka Torment)" (RS Vocal Demo)	3:26
16.	"Holiday 80" (Original Instrumental Mix)	1:45

== Personnel ==
All tracks: lyrics and music written, arranged, played by Steven Severin and Robert Smith.

- Robert Smith - vocals, guitars, bass, keyboards
- Steven Severin - bass, keyboards
- Jeanette Landray - vocals
- Andy Anderson - drums
- Martin McCarrick - keyboards, strings
- James SK Wān - electric kazoo
- Ginny Hewes - strings
- Anne Stephenson - strings
