= The Glove =

Band

- Left to right: Robert Smith, Jeanette Landray and Steven Severin

Background information
- Genres: Post-punk; neo-psychedelia; new wave; dark wave
- Years active: 1983
- Labels: Wonderland; Polydor; Rhino
- Spinoff of: Siouxsie and the Banshees; The Cure
- Past members: Robert Smith; Steven Severin; Jeanette Landray

The Glove was a 1983 English musical collaboration and recording project by singer-guitarist Robert Smith and bassist Steven Severin. They released one studio album, Blue Sunshine, in 1983 as part of Severin's solo deal with Polydor. The latter came up with the band name, the album title and the blue/yellow sleeve concept, as Smith had to leave the project before completion due to prior commitments with The Cure.

== History ==
Robert Smith and Steven Severin founded The Glove during a period when they were under heavy stress in their respective bands, the Cure and Siouxsie and the Banshees.

In June 1982, Smith was on the verge of a breakdown, drained from the production of the Cure's bleakest album, Pornography and its tour, substance abuse, and band infighting that led to the departure of bassist Simon Gallup. In July Smith asked Severin to be the producer for an early version of the Cure's "Lament" for a single given to Flexipop magazine. In October, when playing two one-off shows in Madrid, Banshees guitarist John McGeoch had a nervous breakdown due to alcohol and the stresses of recording and touring, and was fired by the band returning home, shortly before the start of an important European tour. Smith was asked to fill in and officially became a member of the Banshees in November 1982. He had previously played live with the Banshees in 1979 on their Join Hands tour, when he replaced their guitarist John McKay, the latter had walked out at the start of the tour. The Cure had already been the support band, and Smith therefore had played two sets per night in September and October 1979.

Severin and Smith booked a studio in late 1982. The first song that they recorded was "Punish Me with Kisses".

In January 1983, two months after Smith rejoined Siouxsie and the Banshees, Siouxsie Sioux and drummer Budgie left England to record an album on their own as the Creatures. In March, after returning from a Siouxsie and the Banshees tour in Japan and Australasia, Severin and Smith appeared on television to perform live the Cure's song "Siamese Twins", for a ballet conceived by Nicholas Dixion for a UK television program called Riverside: cellists Anne Stephenson and Gini Hewes played with them. Both soon started to work on a project called the Glove. The band's name referred to the enormous flying glove in the Beatles' 1968 animated movie Yellow Submarine. Their album's title, Blue Sunshine, referred to the horror film of the same name, in which people who took the fictional "Blue Sunshine" variety of LSD became psychotic murderers 10 years later. Smith described the recording sessions as "unreal": "We spent 12 weeks in the studio but actually recorded for about five days. The rest of the time was spent having an endless party to which we invited a succession of people. It was like a station -- once they got really out of it, they'd be moved on and the next batch brought in. In between all this we'd record a piece of piano or drum". During that period, the duo stayed up most of the nights watching "video nasties", including Dario Argento films.

Since Smith was contractually prohibited from singing with another band (one of the reasons he cited for the 2001 split from the Cure's longtime label), former Zoo dancer Jeanette Landray (a former girlfriend of Severin's bandmate Budgie) was recruited as the lead singer. Smith sang on two of the songs, "Perfect Murder" and "Mr. Alphabet Says". With the latter, Smith sang lyrics other than his own.

Other musicians involved in this project were Andy Anderson (who was about to become the new Cure drummer), Martin McCarrick (a musician of Marc Almond who later joined the Banshees), and strings players Ginny Hewes and Anne Stephenson. Smith, Severin and Landray promoted the album with a tv appearance on the show Riverside in October 1983.

In 2005, Severin proposed re-releasing Blue Sunshine. Smith, who had been gradually reissuing editions of the Cure's back catalogue, agreed, and The Glove remaster was released as a 2-CD set on 8 August 2006 alongside three Cure re-releases. On the second disc, a dozen unreleased demo versions sung by Smith appeared for the first time. To commemorate Record Store Day 2013 a limited edition blue coloured vinyl version of the LP was produced.

== Personnel ==
- Robert Smith: vocals, guitars, bass, keyboards
- Steven Severin: bass, keyboards
- Jeanette Landray: vocals
- Andy Anderson: drums
- Martin McCarrick: keyboards, strings
- Ginny Hewes: strings
- Anne Stephenson: strings

== Discography ==
=== Studio albums ===
- Blue Sunshine (1983, Wonderland/Polydor)

=== Singles ===
- "Like an Animal" (1983, Wonderland/Polydor)
- "Punish Me with Kisses" (1983, Wonderland/Polydor)

== Sources ==
- The Glove. 2006 Rhino Records CD re-release booklet.
