= The Saint =

The Saint may refer to:

== Fiction ==
- Simon Templar, also known as "The Saint", the protagonist of a book series by Leslie Charteris and subsequent adaptations:
  - The Saint (film series) (1938–1943), starring Louis Hayward, George Sanders and Hugh Sinclair as Simon Templar
  - The Saint (radio program) (1944–1951), a radio program starring Vincent Price
  - The Saint (comics) (1948–1961), a long-running comic strip series
  - The Saint (TV series) (1962–1969), a British television series starring Roger Moore
  - Return of the Saint (1978–1979), a British television series starring Ian Ogilvy
  - The Saint in Manhattan 1987 TV pilot starring Andrew Clarke as Simon Templar, it was shown as part of CBS Summer Playhouse, a series that aired unsold TV pilots.
  - The Saint (TV film series, 1989–1990), six made-for-syndication TV films starring Simon Dutton as Simon Templar, broadcast as part of Mystery Wheel of Adventure:
    - The Saint: The Brazilian Connection
    - The Saint: The Blue Dulac
    - Fear in Fun Park, a.k.a. The Saint in Australia
    - The Saint: Wrong Number
    - The Saint: The Big Bang
    - The Saint: The Software Murders
  - The Saint (1997 film), 1997 American film starring Val Kilmer
    - The Saint (soundtrack), a soundtrack album from the 1997 film
    - The Saint (novel), a novelization of the 1997 film, by Burl Barer
  - The Saint (2017 film), 2017 espionage thriller TV movie directed by Ernie Barbarash and starring Adam Rayner in the title role.
- The Saint (1941 film), a 1941 Bollywood film directed by Abdul Rashid Kardar
- Mahapurush, or The Saint, a 1965 Indian film by Satyajit Ray
- "The Saint" (The Amazing World of Gumball), a 2015 television episode
- "The Saint" (Inside Victor Lewis-Smith), a 1993 television episode
- "The Saint" (Law & Order: Criminal Intent), a 2004 television episode
- The Saint, an omnibus edition of the Gaunt's Ghosts novels, Honour Guard through Sabbat Martyr, by Dan Abnett
- The Saint, the English title for Il Santo, a novel by Italian author Antonio Fogazzaro

== Music ==
- The Saint (music venue), a club showcasing live, original music

=== Songs ===
- "The Saint" (Edwin Astley song), original theme to the 1960s TV series
- "The Saint" (Orbital song), a song by Orbital from the 1997 film soundtrack of the same title and based upon the 1960s TV theme.
- "The Saint" (Thompson Twins song), 1991

== Media ==
- Play Radio (Hampshire), a radio station formerly known as "The Saint"
- WVCR-FM, Siena College radio station branded "88.3 The Saint"
- The Saint (UK newspaper), a student newspaper at the University of St. Andrews, St. Andrews, United Kingdom

== Nickname ==
- Ian St John (1938–2021), Scottish football player nicknamed "The Saint"
- Lynn St. John (1876–1950), American college multi-sports coach and administrator nicknamed "The Saint"

== Other uses ==
- The Saint (New York City), a gay nightclub in New York City that operated from 1980 to 1990

== See also ==
- Saint (disambiguation)
- Santo (disambiguation)
