= The Saint (franchise) =

Film and television franchise

- Official franchise logo, as released in 1997.
- Created by: The Saint novels by Leslie Charteris
- Original work: Meet the Tiger by Leslie Charteris
- Owners: Paramount Pictures (Skydance)

The Saint franchise consists of European and American action-mystery thrillers, including film, radio, and television mediums. Based on the writings of Leslie Charteris, the plot centers around the titular vigilante investigator who operates outside the bounds of the law, under various disguises and aliases; commonly known by the moniker "the Saint".

The franchise has received noted success through decades of media, and has a reboot film in development.

== Origin ==
A series of novels, short stories, and novellas authored by Anglo-Chinese writer Leslie Charteris between 1928 and 1997; centered around the character Simon Templar / The Saint. The character is a heroic charming investigator operating as a contemporary Robin Hood-like vigilante with various aliases and disguises who is characterized by his devil-may-care attitude, while evading law enforcement. Though the initial novel was released in 1928, the origins of the character are evident in early works of the author, some of which predated the first Saint novel. An early Charteris book titled Daredevil not only featured a heroic lead who shared similar traits including driving the same make of vehicle, but also featured Inspector Claud Eustace Teal, a recurring character in various Saint books.

== Film ==
Film	U.S. release date	Director	Screenwriter(s)	Story by	Producer(s)
The "Saint" in New York	June 3, 1938	Ben Holmes	Charles Kaufman & Mortimer Offner	Charles Kaufman & Mortimer Offner and Anthony Veiller	William Sistrom
The Saint Strikes Back	March 10, 1939	John Farrow	John Twist	John Twist	Robert Sisk
The Saint in London	June 30, 1939	John Paddy Carstairs	Lynn Root & Frank Fenton	Lynn Root & Frank Fenton	William Sistrom
The Saint's Double Trouble	January 6, 1940	Jack Hively	Ben Holmes	Leslie Charteris	Cliff Reid
The Saint Takes Over	June 7, 1940	Jack Hively	Lynn Root & Frank Fenton	Lynn Root & Frank Fenton	Howard Benedict
The Saint in Palm Springs	January 24, 1941	Jack Hively	Jerry Cady	Leslie Charteris	Howard Benedict
The Saint's Vacation	May 9, 1941	Leslie Fenton	Leslie Charteris & Jeffrey Dell	Leslie Charteris	William Sistrom
The Saint Meets the Tiger	July 29, 1943	Paul L. Stein	Leslie Arliss & Wolfgang Wilhelm and James Seymour	Leslie Arliss & Wolfgang Wilhelm and James Seymour	William Sistrom
The Saint's Girl Friday	April 15, 1954	Seymour Friedman	Allan MacKinnon	Allan MacKinnon	Anthony Hinds and Julian Lesser
The Saint	April 4, 1997	Phillip Noyce	Jonathan Hensleigh and Wesley Strick	Jonathan Hensleigh	David Brown, Robert Evans, William J. MacDonald and Mace Neufeld
Untitled reboot	TBA	Doug Liman	Kwame Kwei-Armah and Seth Grahame-Smith	Seth Grahame-Smith	Lorenzo di Bonaventura, Brad Krevoy, Robert Evans and Dexter Fletcher

=== The "Saint" in New York (1938) ===
When a series of consecutive lawless acts take place in New York, the commissioner of police hires a British investigator who fights criminal corruption through unorthodox methods named Simon Templar. Known to the law enforcement as "the Saint", Templar quickly begins dismantling criminal organizations throughout the city. When he discovers that there may be a mastermind hiding in plain sight, he begins to turn the offenders against each other, while he draws closer to resolving the corruption.

=== The Saint Strikes Back (1939) ===
Simon Templar is hired to investigate a purported suicide of a seemingly disgraced police inspector in San Francisco, when the man's daughter calls into question the nature of his death. With her suspicions that a criminal organization is involved Templar discovers that prior to the man's untimely passing, he had also been framed for corruption which lead to his dismissal from the police force. Determined to exonerate the man of the lawful misdeeds that he did not commit, "the Saint" races against time to solve the mystery and bring justice to those who are guilty.

=== The Saint in London (1939) ===
Simon Templar returns home to London, where he becomes involved in an investigation in a local gambler who may be guilty of being a part of a counterfeiting criminal organization. Throughout the investigation, he hires a former-thief and a socialite to assist him with the case. Templar begins to question the nature of the situation suspecting that an inspector who is also working on the investigation may be involved, "the Saint" works overtime to resolve the mystery before its too late.

=== The Saint's Double Trouble (1940) ===
Simon Templar finds himself the suspect when a shipment of mummies that were sent to his friend, an archeological professor is found with some stolen diamonds. Believed to have become a jewel smuggler, he races against time to find the perpetrator who framed him for the crime. When he begins to investigate the series of events that preceded the disappearance of the valued items, its discovered that his double Duke Bates is the mastermind. "The Saint" sets out to prove his own existence, apprehend the criminals involved, and reinstate his credibility.

=== The Saint Takes Over (1940) ===
Simon Templar takes a transatlantic trip to New York so that he can assist his old friend Inspector Fernack, who has been suspended due to suspected involvement in bribery. During the investigation, Templar confronts a series of gamblers who have organized fixed horse racing. As he attempts to prove his friend's innocence "the Saint" becomes familiar with a beautiful woman, who maybe have a deception of her own.

=== The Saint in Palm Springs (1941) ===
Simon Templar becomes involved in the criminal underworld, in order to locate extremely rare and valuable stamps that have gone missing. During the investigation, "the Saint" is pursued by various criminals who are desperate and will do anything including murder to acquire the valuables for themselves. Templar turns to an old ally, and together they resolve to complete their assignment in returning the collectibles to their rightful owner.

=== The Saint's Vacation (1941) ===
Initially enjoying a trip of his own outside of work, Simon Templar becomes involved in an impromptu investigation when a seemingly music box becomes a heavily coveted item. As he seeks to retrieve the collectible and return it to the rightful owner, he discovers that the antique instigates a series of robberies, torture, and murder. Racing against the pursuits of the unlawful competitors, "the Saint" turns to the aid of his allies and discovers that it may bring him face to face with one of his most notorious arch enemies.

=== The Saint Meets the Tiger (1943) ===
Following an unexpected visit from an ailing man who notifies Simon Templar about a criminal organization that smuggles gold, Templar begins to investigate and finds the case takes him to an English coastal community. Upon arrival, "the Saint" collaborates with Scotland Yard and the owner of a gold mine named Patricia Holm. As Templar begins to have romantic interests in Holm, she helps him to divert his attention to a criminal known as "the Tiger" where he begins to find sufficient evidence to convict the corruption within their establishment.

=== The Saint's Return (1953) ===
Released in the United States in 1954 as The Saint's Girl Friday

When Simon Templar's friend ends up dead, following her petition for his help, he begins an immediate investigation suspecting foul-play. Together with the assistance of a woman named Carol Denby, Templar infiltrates the ranks of a local criminal organization known as the River Mob. With the gang being involved in the community's gambling business, Templar finds himself working against an established and powerful group with intentions of finding the real nature of his friend's murder.

=== The Saint (1997) ===
A thief who uses various disguises under aliases of various Catholic saints, and the aid of advanced technology in his heists, is hired for a contract by a powerful Russian oil company magnate named Ivan Tretiak. Tasked with stealing the chemical formulas for cold fusion, Templar accepts the job convinced that he can accomplish the mission. After seducing scientist Dr. Emma Russell, he delivers the formulas to Tretiak and expects to move on to the next monetary opportunity. He quickly discovers however, that the formulas were incomplete when a number of criminal alliances begin to pursue him. Learning that Russell is also in danger, Templar races to her rescue while avoiding their lethal advances. Determined to save her life, he resolves to also end their corruption; all while evading the continued pursuits of detectives who have been following him for years.

=== Reboot ===
In February 2020, it was announced that a reboot of the franchise was in development with Chris Pine starring as Templar. Dexter Fletcher initially signed onto the project as director, with a script by Seth Grahame-Smith. Lorenzo di Bonaventura and Brad Krevoy will serve as producers, with Robert Evans credited as a producer posthumously. The project will be a joint venture production between Paramount Pictures and Di Bonaventura Pictures. The studio intends the new adaptation to be the first installment in a series of films. By July 2021 however, Regé-Jean Page was cast in the titular role replacing Pine, while Kwame Kwei-Armah was hired to contribute to the screenplay. In November 2023, Doug Liman had been hired to replace Fletcher as director.

== Radio ==
Title	Dates aired in U.S.		Creator	Sponsor production companies	Distributing networks	Status
Title	First released	Last released	Creator	Sponsor production companies	Distributing networks	Status
The Saint	January 4, 1945	October 14, 1951	Leslie Charteris	Bromo-Seltzer, Campbell Soup Company, Lever Brothers, and Ford Motor Company	National Broadcasting Company (NBC) Columbia Broadcasting System (CBS) CBS West Coast Network Mutual Broadcasting System (MBS)	Ended

Adapted for radio production by Leslie Charteris, the dramatization show was based on his series of novels of the same name. The broadcast featured various actors in the titular role through a number of iterations from January 4, 1945 – October 14, 1951. Starring Edgar Barrier, Brian Aherne, Vincent Price, Tom Conway, and Barry Sullivan in the titular role at different times; the supporting cast included John Brown, Ken Christy, and Louise Arthur as Inspector Fernack, Hoppy, and Patricia Holm, respectively. The Saint was sponsored through funding by Bromo-Seltzer, Campbell Soup Company, Lever Brothers, and Ford Motor Company; and debuted on National Broadcasting Network (NBC), followed by Columbia Broadcasting System (CBS), CBS WEst Coast Network, and then Mutual Broadcasting System (MBS), before returning to NBC. The show was met with positive critical reception, and was notable for its continued inclusion of Charteris throughout its syndicated broadcast, with the associated companies stating: "All scripting will be under the supervision of Charteris, who will oversee the adaptations of his published works. If any originals are to be done, he'll do them."

== Television ==
=== Series ===
Series	Season(s)	Episode(s)	Originally released			Showrunner(s)	Executive producer(s)	Status
Series	Season(s)	Episode(s)	First released	Last released	Network	Showrunner(s)	Executive producer(s)	Status
The Saint	6	118	October 4, 1962	February 9, 1969	Independent Television (ITV)	Leslie Charteris	Monty Berman and Robert S. Baker	Ended
Return of the Saint	1	24	September 10, 1978	March 11, 1979	Independent Television (ITV)	Leslie Charteris, Bob Baker & Lew Grade	Robert S. Baker, Lew Grade, Roger Moore and Anthony Spinner	Ended

==== The Saint (1962–1969) ====
Created by Leslie Charteris and based on his novel series of the same name, the television adaptation was developed in collaboration with the National Broadcasting Company, Tempean Films for ATV, Bamore for ATV, ITC Entertainment, and Independent Television. Starring Roger Moore in the titular role, the series aired from October 4, 1962, through February 9, 1969. Well received by critics and the audience alike, the show had continued success through reruns and debuts in over 60 countries; earning over £350 million for ITC.

Simon Templar, a wealthy adventurer and vigilante private investigator know under the alias of "the Saint", travels the world righting wrongs, solving mysteries, and convicting criminals. Though he is often the individual at the center of solving the investigations, because he lives outside the law, he is also being pursued by various law enforcement agencies. His street-wise experience and wits keep him one step ahead of their machinations to apprehend him for questioning.

==== Return of the Saint (1978–1979) ====
Developed as a follow-up revival to the original show, the series was once again based on his book series of the same name, and created by Charteris; this time with collaboration from producers Bob Baker and Lew Grade. Initially developed as a sequel centered around the son of Simon Templar, this premise was abandoned in favor of a continuation around the same character. The show was a joint production between ITC Entertainment, Associated Television, and Rai Television and aired through Independent Television. Ian Ogilvy starred as the titular character, replacing Moore from the previous series. Though the show was poorly received by critics, its viewership numbers were a success. When series was rebroadcast on CBS in the United States, it was successful with its viewership numbers and became one of the highest profiting shows for the associated studios. The show's cancellation at the request of Grade has since been questioned given its popularity with its audience.

The plot followed a similar premise to other installments in the franchise. Simon Templar, a wealthy vigilante investigator known to others by his alias as "the Saint", takes unsolved mysteries and defeats corruption while living outside the law. Throughout the series he travels through Europe assisting citizens with their needs, while he encounters past friends and acquaintances that also need his assistance. Oftentimes foiling the plans of various criminals, he keeps some of their monetary means for himself, while avoiding pursuits of various law enforcement agencies.

=== Television films ===
Film	U.S. release date	Director	Screenwriter(s)	Producer(s)
The Saint and the Brave Goose	January 7, 1978	Cyril Frankel	John Kruse	Robert S. Baker
The Saint in Manhattan	June 12, 1987	James Frawley	Peter Gethers & David Handler	Dennis E. Dotty
The Saint: The Brazilian Connection	September 2, 1989	Ian Toynton	Anthony Horowitz	Muir Sutherland
The Saint: The Blue Dulac	September 9, 1989	Dennis Berry	Peter Palliser	Jean Chalopin, Dennis E. Dotty and Jacky Stoller
The Saint: Fear in Fun Park	July 14, 1990	Donald Crombie		Sue Milliken and Muir Sutherland
The Saint: Wrong Number	July 21, 1990	Marijan David Vajda		Muir Sutherland
The Saint: The Big Bang	July 28, 1990	Paolo Barzman		Muir Sutherland
The Saint: The Software Murders	August 4, 1990	Henry Herbert		Muir Sutherland
The Saint	July 11, 2017	Ernie Barbarash	Jesse Alexander and Tony Giglio	Jesse Alexander, Roger Moore, Geoffrey Moore, Francisco J. González, Brad Krevoy, Jimmy Townsend, Simon West and Roman Viaris-de-Lesegno

==== The Saint and the Brave Goose (1978) ====
Simon Templar takes part in a speedboat racing event, where one of his competitors named Oscar West seemingly meets his demise when his vehicle experiences mechanical failure and then explodes. When his widow Annabel discovers that her husband lived an extravagant lifestyle and she is left nothing more than a boat named "the Brave Goose". When a group of men kidnaps her, claiming that they worked alongside Oscar in a burglary where he double-crossed them, the escaped convicts question her for the location of the gold that they had collectively stolen. Learning of these transpiring events, "the Saint" comes to her rescue while also determined to help her locate the gold and to solve the mystery surrounding her husband following a new revelation that the group had one other ally.

==== The Saint in Manhattan (1987) ====
Returning to New York City following a previous investigation, Simon Templar is planning on resting and rejuvenating for some time. His plans quickly change, when one of his previous romantic interests, a professional ballerina named Margot Katka reenters his life. After attending one of her performances, she pleads for his assistance as her life is in danger. Determined to protect her, "the Saint" races against time to solve the mystery.

==== The Saint: The Brazilian Connection (1989) ====
Following his involvement in ending the criminal workings of some thieves, Simon Templar finds himself in possession of various riches. After meeting a nanny named Jenny, who was tasked with the care of an American couple's baby, he learns that the baby has gone missing. Desperate for his assistance, "the Saint" determines that the disappearance is in relation to a baby-trafficking organization. Taking the investigation to Brazil, Templar must work quickly to bring the child safely home.

==== The Saint: The Blue Dulac (1989) ====
When the home Jacques and Christine Coustard is obliterated in an explosion, Simon Templar is determined to solve their homicide. The couple were intended to serve as witnesses in a trial against a criminal gangster named George Lafosse, and the latter is acquitted after his mob holds the judge's family hostage. Under the alias and disguise of a jewel thief, Templar infiltrates the Lafosse organization with intentions to avenge the murder of his friends.

==== The Saint: Fear in Fun Park (1990) ====
Simon Templar arrives in Sydney, tasked with investigating the disappearance of one of his friend's daughters. Believed to have been abducted by a Chinese crime ring for human trafficking, Templar soon discovers other similar occurrences in the area. During the investigation, a former romantic interest named Felicity approaches him for his assistance as a variety of Oriental establishments have been threatening her and her parents with intentions to coerce them into selling their fairground amusement location named Fun Park. Determined to help each of his friends and to solve the disappearances of young women in the area, "the Saint" beings to realize connections between the two cases.

==== The Saint: Wrong Number (1990) ====
While initially enjoying a vacation in Berlin, Simon Templar receives a call in his hotel room which was intended for another guest at the establishment with instructions for the receiving end to meet at a specified location for a rendezvous. After they are found to have been murdered in their room, "the Saint" resolves to arrive at the location under the guise of the man who was killed with intentions to investigate the mystery. Avoiding pursuits of similarly intended demise, Templar reaches the location and is approached with recruitment proposition by an anti-terrorist organization which is trying to stop a missile assault by a terrorist named Peter Lang. Determined to save the innocent lives at risk, he works in collaboration with the group to prevent the catastrophic events.

==== The Saint: The Big Bang (1990) ====
Following the death of a millionairess named Baronne being ruled out as suicide, Simon Templar begins his own investigation. Not convinced of the verdict, Templar believes that a more sinister cause of death is to blame. As she was the owner of Grainville Electronics, his research leads him to believe that someone within the corporation organized a homicide with intentions to illegal take-over of the company. With the aid of an American news reporter named Verity, "the Saint" works to determine the true nature of Baronne's death, before her company is assigned new leadership who may be her murderer.

==== The Saint: The Software Murders (1990) ====
Following the suspicious deaths of three scientists who were developing explosive detection devices, Templar's friend and colleague named Jack Rushden is tasked with investigating their demise. When he is murdered while on the phone with Simon Templar followed by the killer threatening to come after him next, "the Saint" determines to avenge his friend and find the killer himself. When his research brings him to a science conference at a rural manor, he works with a computer expert named Irina to solve what has become known publicly as the Software Murders.

==== The Saint (2017) ====
After diverting an exchange between terrorist groups, and escaping with their funds, Simon Templar / the Saint finds himself in the middle of an ongoing pursuit including the parties involved and the FBI. Giving the money to a friend in Bucharest with instructions to distribute the funds to various humanitarian organizations, only for the funds to be intercepted by a banker with a criminal past named Arnie Valecross who was hired by a mysterious man under the alias of "the Fixer". Despite his initial instructions, Valecross sends the money to a different account and seeks assistance from the FBI, with hopes of clearing his name. Following his decision, his daughter Zooey is abducted by the organization that had contracted him for the job; they request the money be returned within 48 hours, using his daughter as a hostage. Being made aware of how the situation has evolved, Templar works with his associate Patricia Holm to discover the true identity of the mysterious man. Racing against the clock, "the Saint" must retrieve the money and save Zooey's life, while staying ahead of the FBI who have been following him for years. During the investigation, he discovers that "the Fixer" may have connections to a dangerous person from his past.

== Main cast and characters ==
List indicators

This section includes characters who will appear or have appeared in the franchise in main roles.

- An empty grey cell indicates the character was not in the film, or that the character's official presence has not yet been confirmed.
- ^{V} indicates a voice-only role.
- ^{Y} indicates a younger version of the character.

Character	Theatrical films											Television			Radio
Character	The "Saint" in New York	The Saint Strikes Back	The Saint in London	The Saint's Double Trouble	The Saint Takes Over	The Saint in Palm Springs	The Saint's Vacation	The Saint Meets the Tiger	The Saint's Return	The Saint	Untitled reboot	The Saint (1962–1969)	Return of the Saint (1978–1979)	Movies	The Saint (1945–1951)
Principal cast
Simon Templar The Saint	Louis Hayward	George Sanders	George Sanders	George Sanders	George Sanders	George Sanders	Hugh Sinclair	Hugh Sinclair	Louis Hayward	Val Kilmer (Note: The adaptation of the character is given a real name as John Rossi, as portrayed by Kilmer.) Adam Smith^{Y}	Regé-Jean Page	Roger Moore	Ian Ogilvy	Ian Ogilvy (Note: Ogilvy portrayed Templar in The Saint and the Brave Goose (1978), continuing his role from the television series titled Return of the Saint.) Andrew Clarke (Note: Clarke portrayed Templar in 1987 for The Saint in Manhattan.) Simon Dutton (Note: Dutton portrayed Templar from 1989-1994 for The Saint: The Brazilian Connection, The Saint: The Blue Dulac, The Saint: Fear in Fun Park, The Saint: Wrong Number, The Saint: The Big Bang, and The Saint: The Software Murders.) Adam Rayner (Note: Rayner portrayed Templar in 2017 for, The Saint.) Louis Hynes^{Y} (Note: Hynes portrayed a younger age Templar in The Saint (2017).)	Edgar Barrier^{V} (Note: Barrier portrayed the character from January 4–March 31, 1945.) Brian Aherne^{V} (Note: Aherne portrayed the character from June 10–September 12, 1945.) Vincent Price^{V} (Note: Price portrayed the character from June 30, 1947–May 20, 1951.) Tom Conway^{V} (Note: Conway portrayed the character from May 21, 1951–October 14, 1951.) Barry Sullivan^{V} (Note: Sullivan briefly portrayed the character in a number of episodes.)
Insp. Henry Fernack	Jonathan Hale	Jonathan Hale		Jonathan Hale	Jonathan Hale	Jonathan Hale								Kevin Tighe (Note: Tighe portrayed Fernack in The Saint in Manhattan.) Enrique Murciano (Note: Murciano portrayed Fernack in The Saint (2017).)	
Insp. Claud Teal			Gordon McLeod				Gordon McLeod	Gordon McLeod	Charles Victor	Alun Armstrong		Ivor Dean		David Ryall (Note: Ryall featured in The Saint: The Software Murders.)	John Brown
Patricia "Pat" Holm								Jean Gillie						Eliza Dushku (Note: Dushku portrayed Holm in The Saint (2017).)	Louise Arthur^{V}
Supporting cast
Hoppy									Thomas Gallagher						Ken Christy^{V}
Hutch Rellin	Sig Ruman														
William Valcross Big Fellow	Frederick Burton														
Valerie Travers		Wendy Barrie													
Mr. Cullis		Jerome Cowan													
Penny Parker			Sally Gray												
Bruno Lang			Henry Oscar												
Anne Bitts				Helene Whitney											
Boss Duke Bates				George Sanders											
The Partner				Bela Lugosi											
Ruth Summers					Wendy Barrie										
"Big" Ben Egan					Pierre Watkin										
Albert "Rocky" Weldon					Roland Drew										
Leo Sloan					Robert Emmett Keane										
Sam Reese					Morgan Conway										
Max Bremer					Cyrus W. Kendall										
Clarence "Pearly" Gates					Paul Guilfoyle	Paul Guilfoyle									
Elna Johnson						Wendy Barrie									
Margaret Forbes						Linda Hayes									
Mr. Evans						Ferris Taylor									
Mary Langdon							Sally Gray								
Monty Hayward							Arthur Macrae								
Rudolph Hauser							Cecil Parker								
SIS Valerie							Leueen Macgrath								
Mr. Tidemarsh The Tiger								Clifford Evans							
Carol Denby									Naomi Chance						
Kate Finch									Jane Carr						
Max Lennar									Sydney Tafler						
Dr. Emma Russell										Elisabeth Shue					
Ivan Petrovich Tretiak										Rade Šerbedžija					
Ilya Tretiak										Valery Nikolaev					
Dr. Lev Naumovich Botvin										Henry Goodman					
President of Russia Karpov										Evgeny Lazarev					
Radio announcer										Roger Moore					
Margot Katka														Liliana Komorowska (Note: Komorowska featured in The Saint in Manhattan.)	
Fran Grogan														Holland Taylor (Note: Taylor featured in The Saint in Manhattan.)	
Lily Palmer / Jessica Daniels														Caitlin Clarke (Note: Clarke featured in The Saint in Manhattan.)	
Mrs. Cunningham														Gayle Hunnicutt (Note: Hunnicutt featured in The Saint: The Brazilian Connection.)	
Jenny The Nanny														Jenifer Landor (Note: Landor featured in The Saint: The Brazilian Connection.)	
Sabine Gautier														Sabine Naud (Note: Sabine Naud featured in The Saint: The Blue Dulac.)	
Seraphine Gautier														Camille Naud (Note: Camille Naud featured in The Saint: The Blue Dulac.)	
George Lafosse														John Astin (Note: Astin featured in The Saint: The Blue Dulac.)	
Harry														Ed Devereaux (Note: Devereaux featured in The Saint: Fear in Fun Park.)	
Aileen														Rebecca Gilling (Note: Gilling featured in The Saint: Fear in Fun Park.)	
Felicity														Nikki Coghill (Note: Coghill featured in The Saint: Fear in Fun Park.)	
Justin														Richard Roxburgh (Note: Roxburgh featured in The Saint: Fear in Fun Park.)	
Stella Moreau														Arielle Dombasle (Note: Dombasle featured in The Saint: Wrong Number.)	
Otto Schmidt														Günther Maria Halmer (Note: Halmer featured in The Saint: Wrong Number.)	
Gen. Daniel T. Donovan														Vince Edwards (Note: Edwards featured in The Saint: Wrong Number.)	
Col. Dimitri Grigoriev														Manfred Lehmann (Note: Lehmann featured in The Saint: Wrong Number.)	
Peter Lang														Arnfried Lerche (Note: Lerche featured in The Saint: Wrong Number.)	
Verity														Morgan Brittany (Note: Brittany featured in The Saint: The Big Bang.)	
Baroness Stoller														Dominique Varda (Note: Varda featured in The Saint: The Big Bang.)	
Mr. Demoyne														Jerry Di Giacomo (Note: Di Giacomo featured in The Saint: The Big Bang.)	
Mr. Blancpain														Jean-Claude Dauphin (Note: Dauphin featured in The Saint: The Big Bang.)	
Irina														Pamela Sue Martin (Note: Martin featured in The Saint: The Software Murders.)	
River														Malcolm Stoddard (Note: Stoddard featured in The Saint: The Software Murders.)	
Arnold "Arnie" Valecross														James Remar (Note: Remar featured in The Saint (2017).)	
Zooey Valecross														Sammi Hanratty (Note: Hanratty featured in The Saint (2017).)	
Xander The Fixer														Ian Ogilvy (Note: Ogilvy portrays the villain in The Saint (2017), after previously starring as the titular heroic character in Return of the Saint television series and its television movie, The Saint and the Brave Goose.) Adam Woodward^{Y} (Note: Woodward featured in The Saint (2017).)	
Rayt Marius														Thomas Kretschmann (Note: Kretschmann featured in The Saint (2017).)	
Jasper														Roger Moore (Note: Moore portrays a different character in The Saint (2017), after previously starring as the titular hero in the 1960s television series.)	

== Additional crew and production details ==
Title	Crew/Detail					
Title	Composer(s)	Cinematographer(s)	Editor(s)	Production companies	Distributing companies	Running time
The "Saint" in New York	Roy Webb	Joseph H. August & Frank Redman	Harry Marker	RKO Radio Pictures		1hr 11 mins
The Saint Strikes Back	Roy Webb	Frank Redman	Jack Hively	RKO Radio Pictures		1 hr 6 mins
The Saint in London	Marr Mackie	Claude Friese-Greene	Douglas Robertson	RKO Radio Pictures		1 hr 17 mins
The Saint's Double Trouble	Roy Webb	J. Roy Hunt	Theron Warth & Desmond Marquette	RKO Radio Pictures		1 hr 17 mins
The Saint Takes Over	Roy Webb	Frank Redman	Desmond Marquette	RKO Radio Pictures		1 hr 9 mins
The Saint in Palm Springs	Roy Webb	Harry J. Wild	George Hively	RKO Radio Pictures		1 hr 6 mins
The Saint's Vacation	Bretton Byrd	Bernard Knowles	Al Barnes & Ralph Kemplen	RKO Radio Pictures		1 hr 1 min
The Saint Meets the Tiger	Bretton Byrd, John Greenwood, Miklós Rózsa, and Roy Webb	Robert Krasker	Ralph Kemplen	RKO Radio British Productions	RKO Radio Pictures	1 hr 10 mins
The Saint's Return	Roy Webb	Walter J. Harvey	James Needs	Hammer Film Productions	RKO Radio Pictures, Exclusive Films	1 hr 13 mins
The Saint and the Brave Goose	John Scott	Frank Watts	Peter Pitt	Incorporated Television Company	ITC Entertainment	1 hr 40 mins
The Saint: The Brazilian Connection	Serge Franklin	Ian Toynton	Bill Shapter	Taffner Ramsay-Templar Productions	Network Seven	1 hr 40 mins
The Saint: The Blue Dulac	Serge Franklin	Ian Toynton	Bill Shapter	Taffner Ramsay-Templar Productions	Network Seven	1 hr 32 mins
The Saint: Fear in Fun Park	Peter Best	Andrew Lesnie	Donald Crombie	Taffner Ramsay-Templar Productions	Network Seven	1 hr 40 mins
The Saint: Wrong Number	Günther Fischer	Michael Heiter	Jutta Hering & Bill Shapter	Taffner Ramsay-Templar Productions	Network Seven	1 hr 40 mins
The Saint: The Big Bang	Serge Franklin	John Handler	Paolo Barzman	Taffner Ramsay-Templar Productions	Network Seven	1 hr 40 mins
The Saint: The Software Murders	Serge Franklin	Henry Herbert		Taffner Ramsay-Templar Productions	Network Seven	1 hr 40 mins
The Saint (1997)	Graeme Revell	Phil Meheux	Terry Rawlings	Mace Neufeld Productions, Rysher Entertainment	Paramount Pictures	1 hr 56 mins
The Saint (2017)	Neal Acree	Paul M. Sommers	Michael Purl, Heath Ryan & Henk Van Eeghen	Motion Picture Corporation of America, Silver Screen Pictures	20th Century Studios Home Entertainment	1 hr 31 mins
Untitled reboot	TBA	TBA	TBA	Warner Bros. Pictures		TBA

== Reception ==
=== Box office and financial performance ===
Film	Box office gross			Box office ranking		Worldwide Total income	Budget	Ref.
Film	North America	Other territories	Worldwide	All time North America	All time worldwide	Worldwide Total income	Budget	Ref.
The "Saint" in New York	$460,000	—N/a	$460,000	Information not publicly available	—N/a	>$460,000	$128,000	
The Saint Strikes Back	$460,000	—N/a	$460,000	Information not publicly available	—N/a	>$460,000	$128,000	
The Saint in London	$140,000	—N/a	$140,000	Information not publicly available	—N/a	$140,000	Information not publicly available	
The Saint's Double Trouble	Information not publicly available	—N/a	Information not publicly available	Information not publicly available	—N/a	Information not publicly available	Information not publicly available	
The Saint Takes Over	Information not publicly available	—N/a	Information not publicly available	Information not publicly available	—N/a	Information not publicly available	Information not publicly available	
The Saint in Palm Springs	Information not publicly available	—N/a	Information not publicly available	Information not publicly available	—N/a	$90,000	Information not publicly available	
The Saint's Vacation	Information not publicly available	—N/a	Information not publicly available	Information not publicly available	—N/a	Information not publicly available	Information not publicly available	
The Saint Meets the Tiger	Information not publicly available	—N/a	Information not publicly available	Information not publicly available	—N/a	Information not publicly available	Information not publicly available	
The Saint's Return	Information not publicly available	—N/a	Information not publicly available	Information not publicly available	—N/a	Information not publicly available	Information not publicly available	
The Saint	$61,363,304	$108,036,696	$169,400,000	#1,440	#964	>$169,400,000	$90,000,000	
Totals	>$62,423,304	$108,036,696	>$170,460,000	x̄ #144	x̄ #96	>$170,550,000	>$90,256,000	

=== Critical and public response ===
Film	Rotten Tomatoes	Metacritic	CinemaScore	
Film	The "Saint" in New York		—N/a	—N/a
The Saint Strikes Back		—N/a	—N/a	
The Saint in London		—N/a	—N/a	
The Saint's Double Trouble		—N/a	—N/a	
The Saint Takes Over		—N/a	—N/a	
The Saint in Palm Springs		—N/a	—N/a	
The Saint's Vacation		—N/a	—N/a	
The Saint Meets the Tiger	TBD	—N/a	—N/a	
The Saint's Return	TBD	—N/a	—N/a	
The Saint (TV series)	(5 reviews)	—N/a	—N/a	
Return of the Saint (TV series)	—N/a	—N/a	—N/a	
The Saint and the Brave Goose	—N/a	—N/a	—N/a	
The Saint in Manhattan	—N/a	—N/a	—N/a	
The Saint: The Brazilian Connection	—N/a	—N/a	—N/a	
The Saint: The Blue Dulac	—N/a	—N/a	—N/a	
The Saint: Fear in Fun Park	—N/a	—N/a	—N/a	
The Saint: Wrong Number	—N/a	—N/a	—N/a	
The Saint: The Big Bang	—N/a	—N/a	—N/a	
The Saint: The Software Murders	—N/a	—N/a	—N/a	
The Saint (1997)	30% (47 reviews)	50/100 (22 reviews)	B+	
The Saint (2017)		—N/a	—N/a	
