= Body Count =

Body count refers to the total number of people killed in a particular event.

Body count, Body Count or Bodycount may also refer to:

== Film ==
- Body Count (1986 film), an Italian slasher film directed by Ruggero Deodato
- Body Count (1997 film) or Below Utopia, an American thriller directed by Kurt Voss
- Body Count (1998 film), an American crime thriller directed by Robert Patton-Spruill

== Music ==
- Body Count (band), a heavy metal band formed by Ice-T in 1989
  - Body Count (album), a 1992 album by Body Count
  - "Body Count", the title track of the 1992 album
- "Bodycount", a song by Jessie Reyez
- "Body Count", a song by Justin Timberlake from the 2013 album The 20/20 Experience
- "Body Count", a song by Mozzy from the 2020 album Beyond Bulletproof
- "Body Count", a song by Shenseea from the 2022 album Alpha (Shenseea album)

== Other ==
- Body Count (book), a 2012 book by Burl Barer
- "Body Count" (CSI: Miami), an episode of CSI: Miami
- Body count (sexual partners), slang term referring to a subject's number of sexual partners

== See also ==
- Casualty estimation, the process of estimating the number of injuries or deaths in a particular event that has already occurred
- Casualty prediction, the process of predicting the number of injuries or deaths in a particular event that has not yet occurred
- Operation Body Count, a 1994 first-person shooter video game
