= Capture the Saint =

1997 novel by Burl Barer and based on characters by Leslie Charteris

- Limited collector's edition
- Author: Burl Barer, based on characters by Leslie Charteris
- Language: English
- Series: The Saint (franchise)
- Genre: Mystery
- Publisher: The Saint Club
- Publication date: 1997
- Publication place: United States
- Media type: Print (trade paperback)
- Preceded by: The Saint (film novelization)
- Followed by: final book of series to date

Capture the Saint is the title of a 1997 mystery novel by Burl Barer, featuring the character of Simon Templar, alias "The Saint" who was created by Leslie Charteris in 1928.

Along with a novelization of the 1997 film, The Saint, also written by Barer, these were the first original Simon Templar works published since 1983 and the first to not be based upon a television or film script since 1980. It was issued by The Saint Club, a worldwide fan club for the series which Charteris himself had established in 1936.

Capture the Saint was the 52nd Saint book published since 1928 and currently remains the final literary adventure of Simon Templar. According to the website The Saintly Bible, Ian Dickerson, who wrote the authorized biography of Leslie Charteris, was at one point working on a new Saint novel based upon a story idea by the late author. Son of the Saint would feature the return of Templar's longtime girlfriend Patricia Holm and feature their son. To date the book remains unpublished.

As of 2015, Capture the Saint is out of print, though an e-book version is available.

== Story summary ==
Simon Templar is attending the premiere of the film adaptation of his novel The Pirate in Seattle, Washington. A young girl he rescued years prior returns as an adult to enlist his aid in stopping a predatory, pedophilic police officer preying on the city's homeless youth. Separately, he is approached in regards to locating a lost treasure.
