= Peter de Rosa =

British author and former Roman Catholic priest (1932–2024)

- Born: Peter Clement de Rosa; 12 November 1932; London, England
- Died: 4 November 2024 (aged 91); Ringwood, Hampshire, England
- Occupations: Author, theologian, television writer
- Spouse: Mary Hennelly
- Children: 2
- Writing career
- Pen name: Neil Boyd
- Genres: Humour, religion, history
- Notable works: Bless Me, Father; Vicars of Christ; Rebels: The Irish Rising of 1916

Peter Clement de Rosa (12 November 1932 – 4 November 2024) was a British author, theologian and former Roman Catholic priest. He wrote the semi-autobiographical Bless Me, Father series of comic novels under the pen name Neil Boyd, and adapted them into the ITV television sitcom of the same name. He later wrote works on religion and history under his own name, including Vicars of Christ: The Dark Side of the Papacy (1988) and Rebels: The Irish Rising of 1916 (1990).

== Early life and priesthood ==
De Rosa was born in London in 1932. He attended St Ignatius' College and was ordained a Roman Catholic priest. He graduated from the Pontifical Gregorian University in Rome and taught metaphysics and ethics at Westminster Seminary in London before becoming dean of theology at Corpus Christi College in London.

De Rosa wrote on Christian theology while still a priest. His early works included Communion of the Sick (1964), Christ in Our World (1966), Christ and Original Sin (1967) and God Our Saviour (1968).

In 1970, de Rosa left the priesthood. He subsequently worked in London as a staff producer for the BBC.

== Writing career ==
De Rosa became a full-time writer in 1978. His best-known fiction was published under the pseudonym Neil Boyd. The first novel, Bless Me, Father, drew on his experiences as a young curate and concerned the newly ordained Father Neil Boyd and his relationship with the older Irish parish priest Father Charles Duddleswell. The stories were set in a fictional London parish during the early 1950s.

The novel developed into a five-book series comprising Bless Me, Father, A Father Before Christmas, Father in a Fix, Father Under Fire and Bless Me Again, Father. De Rosa used his pseudonym as the name of the young curate who narrates the stories.

The books were adapted as the television sitcom Bless Me, Father, produced for ITV. De Rosa wrote all 21 episodes, which were broadcast in three series from 1978 to 1981. Arthur Lowe played Father Duddleswell and Daniel Abineri played Father Neil Boyd.

De Rosa continued writing on Christianity and the Catholic Church under his own name. His Vicars of Christ: The Dark Side of the Papacy, published in 1988, presented a critical history of the papacy and Catholic teaching and government.

He subsequently turned to Irish history with Rebels: The Irish Rising of 1916, first published in 1990, an account of the Easter Rising and its aftermath. His later works included the novel Pope Patrick, a satire about an Irish cardinal elected pope.

In 1993, de Rosa collaborated with Annie Murphy on Forbidden Fruit: The True Story of My Secret Love for Eamonn Casey, the Bishop of Galway, Murphy's account of her relationship with Irish Catholic bishop Eamonn Casey and the birth of their son. The relationship became one of the most prominent scandals involving the Irish Catholic Church after it became public in 1992.

== Personal life and death ==
De Rosa married Mary Hennelly and they had two sons, Francis and Daniel. The family lived for many years in Ashford, County Wicklow, Ireland. Mary de Rosa died in 2005. De Rosa later returned to England and lived in Bournemouth, Dorset. He died following a short illness in Ringwood, Hampshire, on 4 November 2024, aged 91.

== Selected bibliography ==
=== As Peter de Rosa ===
- Communion of the Sick (Pastoral Publications, 1964)
- with Hubert J. Richards, Christ in Our World: A Study of Baptism, Eucharist, Penance and Marriage (Geoffrey Chapman, 1966; ISBN 0-225-27599-6)
- Christ and Original Sin (Geoffrey Chapman, 1967)
- God Our Saviour: A Study of the Atonement (Geoffrey Chapman, 1968)
- Jesus Who Became Christ (Collins, 1975; ISBN 0-00-215376-9)
- Come Holy Spirit: The Life of God in the Life of Men (Fontana, 1975; ISBN 0-00-623779-7)
- A Bible Prayer-book for Today (Fontana, 1976; ISBN 0-00-624190-5)
- Prayers for Pagans and Hypocrites (Collins, 1977; ISBN 0-00-216657-7)
- Vicars of Christ: The Dark Side of the Papacy (Bantam, 1988; ISBN 0-593-01357-3)
- Rebels: The Irish Rising of 1916 (Bantam, 1990; ISBN 0-593-01751-X)
- with Annie Murphy, Forbidden Fruit: The True Story of My Secret Love for Eamonn Casey, the Bishop of Galway (Little, Brown and Company, 1993; ISBN 0-316-90573-9)
- Pope Patrick (Poolbeg, 1995; ISBN 1-85371-547-6)

=== As Neil Boyd ===
- Bless Me, Father (Robert Hale, 1977; ISBN 0-7091-5860-2)
- A Father Before Christmas (Michael Joseph, 1978; ISBN 0-7181-1692-5)
- Father in a Fix (Michael Joseph, 1979; ISBN 0-7181-1784-0)
- Father Under Fire (Michael Joseph, 1980; ISBN 0-7181-1873-1)
- Bless Me Again, Father (Michael Joseph, 1981; ISBN 0-7181-1985-1)
- Father Neil's Monkeyshines (Open Road Integrated Media, 2019; ISBN 978-1-5040-5573-4)
