= Loss exchange ratio =

Figure of merit in attrition warfare

Loss exchange ratio is a figure of merit in attrition warfare, and is generally defined as the ratio of the losses (e.g., casualties) sustained by each side in a conflict. It is usually relevant to a condition or state of war where one side depletes the resources of another through attrition. Specifically and most often used as a comparator in aerial combat, where it is known as a kill-ratio.

== Historical applications ==
Loss exchange ratio has played a significant role in past wars, especially those that have devolved into stalemate and become wars of attrition. For example, the German objective at the Battle of Verdun (1916) during World War I was not the seizure of any strategic objective, but rather to inflict an LER of 2:1 on the French forces and thereby cripple the French army.

During the First Indochina War, Võ Nguyên Giáp, the leader of the Việt Minh, told his French opposite number that "you can kill ten of my men for every one I kill of yours, and at that rate, I will still triumph." In fact, the LER was approximately 3:1 in favor of the French, and they did indeed withdraw in defeat. A total of 500,000+ Vietnamese were either killed, wounded or captured during the First Indochina War.

== Contemporary employment ==
It is arguable that the concept of the Loss exchange ratio has become relatively less important in modern Western military doctrine, as some military theories posit that it is just as militarily effective to disrupt enemy forces and outmaneuver them, thereby reducing their combat effectiveness without necessarily inflicting massive casualties.

== See also ==
- Non-combatant Casualty Value
- Civilian casualty ratio
- Attrition warfare
- Body count
- Casualty estimation
