= Karin Boyd =

German actress and Theatre director

- Born: 1953 (age 72–73); East Berlin, East Germany
- Occupation: Actress
- Years active: 1973–present
- Website: Official Homepage of Karin Boyd (in German)

Karin Boyd (born 1953) is a German actress and Theatre director.

== Life and career ==
Boyd was born in 1953 in East Berlin. Boyd's father was an American soldier. Boyd's mother was a German.

Boyd completed a three-year study acting at the National Theatre School in Rostock, followed by an additional vocal training at the Department of chanson at the Music School in East Berlin Friedrichshain. After working at several small stages in 1973 she came to the Maxim Gorki Theatre in East Berlin, where she played for ten years. In addition, she also played first film and television roles for the East German DEFA and Deutscher Fernsehfunk.

Her breakthrough as an actress came in 1981 in the role of the dancer Juliette Martens in István Szabó's Oscar-winning film Mephisto starring Klaus Maria Brandauer.

After her exit visa had been granted, in 1983, she moved with her son to West Germany and played on West German theater stages. She occurred in the popular TV-Series Ein Fall für zwei and also in the television series Die Sitte. In the 1990s she moderated various TV formats.

== Awards ==
- 1993: Hersfeld-Preis

== Filmography (selection) ==
- 1969: Zeit zu leben
- 1974: Visa für Ocantros (TV film)
- 1976: Soviel Lieder, soviel Worte
- 1977: Die Marquise (TV film)
- 1978: Oh, diese Tante (TV film)
- 1978: Das unsichtbare Visier: King-Kong-Grippe (TV series)
- 1979: Chiffriert an Chef – Ausfall Nr. 5
- 1980: Früher Sommer (TV film)
- 1981: Mephisto
- 1982: Monsieur bleibt im Schatten (TV film)
- 1986: Roncalli (TV series)
- 1986: Deutsche sind weiß, Neger können keine Deutschen sein (TV documentary)
- 1987: Duett in Bonn (TV series)
- 1988: Wilder Westen inclusive (TV series)
- 1996: Das Siegel des Todes (TV film)
- 1998: Geraubte Unschuld (TV film)
- 1988: Jenseits von Blau
- 2001-2006: Die Sitte (TV series)
- 2006: Rapture of the Deep (TV film)
- 2008: A Year Ago in Winter
- 2011: The Family (TV film)
