= Bless Me, Father =

- Title screen of Series 1
- Genre: Comedy
- Written by: Peter de Rosa
- Directed by: David Askey
- Starring: Arthur Lowe; Daniel Abineri; Gabrielle Daye; Patrick McAlinney
- Country of origin: United Kingdom
- Original language: English
- No. of series: 3
- No. of episodes: 21

Production
- Running time: 30 minutes
- Production company: LWT

Original release
- Network: ITV
- Release: 24 September 1978 – 16 August 1981

Bless Me, Father is a British sitcom starring Arthur Lowe, Daniel Abineri, Gabrielle Daye, Patrick McAlinney, David Ryall, and Sheila Keith. It was aired on ITV from 24 September 1978 until 16 August 1981 and described the adventures of an Irish Catholic priest, Father Charles Duddleswell (Lowe) and his young curate (Abineri) in the fictional parish of St. Jude's in suburban London. Twenty-one episodes, written by Peter de Rosa (who had previously been a novice curate), were aired. De Rosa wrote the books on which the series was based using the pseudonym of Neil Boyd which was also the name of the young curate character; Boyd also served as the narrator in the series of novels upon which the series was based. It was made for the ITV network by LWT.

The series was set in 1950 and 1951 and marked a departure from the middle-class "bank manager" roles associated with Lowe such as that in Dad's Army. The other regular characters included Mrs Pring (Daye), the housekeeper, the hard-drinking Dr Daley (McAlinney), the non-religious neighbour Billy Buzzle (Ryall), and abbess Reverend Mother Stephen (Keith).

The programme ended after its third series in 1981, several months before Lowe's death in April 1982. In an interview on Pebble Mill at One on 14 April 1982, the day before he died, Lowe said that he had enjoyed making the programme and would have liked to continue it. He noted that Daniel Abineri had moved to Australia after marrying there, but did not believe Abineri's departure alone explained why no further series was made, suggesting that other production considerations may have been involved.

Yes I enjoyed that very much. I enjoyed that because it was such a change from playing these bumbling old Englishmen, but... I would have liked to do more of that but for some reason or other we didn't and I don't know quite why. For one thing I know young Abineri, the boy who played my curate, he went to Australia, more or less on a permanent basis. He married a girl out there and we've lost him to the clergy but... I don't think that was a sufficient reason in itself, I mean there must've been some other politics behind it, because one can always get another curate [for the series]... however Lionel Jeffries has done something similar as recently so...

— Arthur Lowe on the series, interviewed on Pebble Mill at One on 14 April 1982, the day before his death.

== Cast ==
- Arthur Lowe as Father Charles Clement Duddleswell (all episodes)
- Daniel Abineri as Father Neil Boyd (all episodes)
- Gabrielle Daye as Mrs Pring (all episodes)
- Patrick McAlinney as Dr Daley (12 episodes)
- David Ryall as Billy Buzzle (9 episodes)
- Sheila Keith as Mother Stephen (8 episodes)
- Geoffrey Drew as Mr Pinkerton (4 episodes)
- Pamela Ruddock as Mrs Rollings (3 episodes)

Guest actors on the series include Derek Francis, Phoebe Nicholls, Daniel Gerroll, Peter Bowles, Clive Swift, Rynagh O'Grady, Michael Troughton, Geoffrey Palmer and Peter Copley.

== Episodes ==
The series was repeated from March 2020 on Fox Classics.

=== Series 1 ===
No. overall	No. in series	Title	Directed by	Written by	Original release date
1	1	"Baptism of Fire"	David Askey	Peter de Rosa	24 September 1978
2	2	"The Bell of St. Jude's"	David Askey	Peter de Rosa	1 October 1978
3	3	"The Parish Bazaar"	David Askey	Peter de Rosa	8 October 1978
4	4	"The Doomsday Chair"	David Askey	Peter de Rosa	15 October 1978
5	5	"Father & Mother"	David Askey	Peter de Rosa	22 October 1978
6	6	"The Tennis Match"	David Askey	Peter de Rosa	29 October 1978
7	7	"The Seal of Confession"	David Askey	Peter de Rosa	5 November 1978

=== Series 2 ===
No. overall	No. in series	Title	Directed by	Written by	Original release date
8	1	"Blessings from Heaven"	David Askey	Peter de Rosa	11 November 1979
9	2	"Father Neil's First Miracle"	David Askey	Peter de Rosa	18 November 1979
10	3	"Fatal Lady"	David Askey	Peter de Rosa	25 November 1979
11	4	"The Heart of a Curate"	David Askey	Peter de Rosa	9 December 1979
12	5	"All at Sea"	David Askey	Peter de Rosa	16 December 1979
13	6	"The Season of Goodwill"	David Askey	Peter de Rosa	23 December 1979
14	7	"A Back to Front Wedding"	David Askey	Peter de Rosa	6 January 1980

=== Series 3 ===
No. overall	No. in series	Title	Directed by	Written by	Original release date
15	1	"Things Are Not What They Seem"	David Askey	Peter de Rosa	5 July 1981
16	2	"Women"	David Askey	Peter de Rosa	12 July 1981
17	3	"Beddings and Weddings"	David Askey	Peter de Rosa	19 July 1981
18	4	"Fire & Brimstone"	David Askey	Peter de Rosa	26 July 1981
19	5	"A Legend Comes to Stay"	David Askey	Peter de Rosa	2 August 1981
20	6	"Porgy & Bess"	David Askey	Peter de Rosa	9 August 1981
21	7	"A Mixed-Up Marriage"	David Askey	Peter de Rosa	16 August 1981

== Home media ==
The complete series of Bless Me, Father has been released on DVD in region 1, region 2 and region 4. In the United States and Canada, "The Complete Collection" was released on 26 April 2005 from Acorn Media. In the United Kingdom, distribution company Network DVD released the complete series on 6 August 2007. In Australia, the complete series was released on 11 March 2015 via distribution company Reel DVD.

== Book series ==
Peter De Rosa, formerly an ordained Catholic priest and lecturer, left the priesthood in 1970 and later became a full-time author. Under the pen-name Neil Boyd he wrote the Bless Me, Father novels from which the TV series was adapted.

Boyd, Neil (1977). Bless Me, Father. London: Robert Hale.
Boyd, Neil (1978). A Father Before Christmas. London: Michael Joseph.
Boyd, Neil (1979). Father in a Fix. London: Michael Joseph.
Boyd, Neil (1980). Father Under Fire. London: Michael Joseph.
Boyd, Neil (1981). Bless Me Again, Father. London: Michael Joseph.
Boyd, Neil (2019). Father Neil's Monkeyshines. New York City: Open Road Media.
