= Burl Barer =

American novelist

- Born: 1947 (age 78–79); Walla Walla, Washington
- Occupations: Crime writer; novelist; radio host
- Children: 2
- Relatives: nephews Tod Goldberg and Lee Goldberg
- Writing career
- Period: 1978–present
- Genre: Fiction
- Subject: True crime
- Website: burlbarer.net

Burl Barer (born 1947 in Walla Walla, Washington) is an American author, literary historian and radio host. He is best known for his writings about the character Simon Templar.

== Career ==
=== Fiction ===
==== The Saint ====
The Saint: A Complete History in Print, Radio, Television, and Film was first published in 1992 and republished in 2003. Barer received a 1994 Edgar Award for the book. In 2010, Barer began research on a second edition for McFarland & Company, expanding the time period from 1992 through 2013 to include everything about the character of Simon Templar.

Barer has written two novels, both published in 1997, based upon the character of Templar. The first was a novelization of the screenplay for the 1997 film adaptation of The Saint starring Val Kilmer, although the film was loosely based on the character. It was followed by Capture the Saint, which was released by The Saint Club (an organization founded by Charteris) to mark the 70th anniversary of the character's first appearance in Meet - The Tiger!. It is the most recent Saint story to be published as of 2006. In June 2010, Barer began writing The Return of the Saint, also known as The Saint Strikes Back, a novel set in the U.K. in which Simon Templar combats human trafficking. In collaboration with producer William J. Macdonald, Barer wrote a two-hour screenplay, The Saint in New Orleans, as a pilot episode for a new Saint television series that was set to begin filming in July 2011. Unexpected delays, including changes in the lead actor, shut down initial production. As of September 2011, the pilot was cut down to one hour by another screenwriter, and a search was launched for a new lead actor. In 2013, Barer consulted for a new television pilot for The Saint starring Adam Rayner as Simon Templar.

=== True crime ===
Barer is the author of true crime non-fiction books, including Man Overboard: The Counterfeit Resurrection of Phil Champagne, which was nominated for an Anthony Award by the World Mystery Convention in the category of Best True Crime, Murder in the Family, Body Count, Head Shot, Mom Said Kill, Fatal Beauty, and Broken Doll.

Barer and co-writer Frank Girardot collaborated on the 2016 true crime tale A Taste for Murder. The two authors reunited that same year to write Betrayal in Blue based on the memoir of former corrupt NYPD officer Ken Eurell.

Barer is listed by the Williamsburg Regional Library in its list of 100-plus narrative non-fiction authors to read.

Barer is known for using real people in his novels and using the names of fictional characters from his novels as "replacement names" in his true crime books, for people who do not want their real names used. Barer, who was once also a "distance reader" (psychic/mentalist), appears in his own true crime book, Body Count, as psychic/mentalist/true crime author Jeff Reynolds, the name of his fictional protagonist in the novel Headlock. Chet Rogers, Travis Webb, and Donna McCooke are other real people who appear in both his works of fiction and non-fiction. Rogers and Webb are journalists, and McCooke is a prominent health care professional in the UK. Rogers appears as a newsman in Barer's novelization of The Saint, and McCooke appears as a love interest for a jet pilot in the novelization of Stealth, published first in Japan and later in the US and UK as an e-book demonstrating the craft of writing novelizations. He contributed "The Alaska Mail Bomb Conspiracy" to the anthology Masters of True Crime, edited by R. Barri Flowers and published by Prometheus Books in 2012.

=== Television ===
In the 1980s, Barer and Kenneth H. Thompson established a cable television advertising interconnect in Eastern Washington. Barer Cable Advertising, Inc., utilizing a proprietary method of inventory allocation, became the highest grossing interconnect in America, garnering over 1000 X the national average in dollar per subscriber household revenue per month. The markets were later sold to the Multi-System Operators in the various markets.

In 2012, Barer and Don Woldman, previously teamed on Outlaw Radio's True Crime Uncensored, reunited as contributors to various true crime-related specials and discussions on Hart D. Fisher's American Horrors channel, featured as part of the basic tier of channels offered on filmon.com.

Barer has appeared on Investigation Discovery television shows, including Deadly Women (2011), Snapped (2011), Scorned: Love Kills (2012), Deadly Sins (2013), and Behind Mansion Walls (2013).

Barer and his dog, Isis, were featured in two episodes of the series Dog Whisperer with Cesar Millan.

In 2013, Barer served as a consultant to the television pilot series, "The Saint", starring Adam Rayner as Simon Templar.

=== Radio ===
Before becoming an author, Barer was a radio personality in the Pacific Northwest. He began his broadcast career on KUJ (AM) in Walla Walla, Washington, KTEL (AM) in Walla Walla, KYAC Seattle, KJR Seattle, KOL AM & FM Seattle, KIRO Seattle, KQUIN Burien, Washington, and KZOK-FM.

In partnership with Terry McManus, Barer wrote and produced national radio commercials for many touring performers, including Frank Sinatra and Bob Dylan. He frequently contributed to the Robert W. Morgan Special of the Week. Barer received Gold Records for "Nights in White Satin", "Layla", and "Walk on the Wild Side".

A compilation by Burl Barer, Selections from the Holy Qurʼan: Translations and Emendations by Shoghi Effendi, appeared as an appendix in James Heggie's Baháʼí References to Judaism, Christianity and Islam. It was Barer's first contribution to an internationally distributed reference work.

Returning to Walla Walla, Washington in the 1980s, Barer teamed with Thomas D. Hodgins to launch several radio stations including Lucky 98, Power 99, and KUJ-FM. One of his radio shows was included in Northwest Hall of Radio History, a project of The Edward R. Murrow College of Communication at Washington State University in Pullman, Washington.

In 2007, Barer became a regular participant on the long-running Internet radio program Outlaw Radio hosted by Matt Alan.

In March 2008, Barer teamed up with Woldman for their own show, focusing on crime. True Crimes won the 2009 In Cold Blog Detective Award for Best True Crime Radio Program. The show was renamed "True Crime Uncensored" in 2010, and features interviews with authors such as Gregg Olsen, Cathy Scott, and Daniel Genis. In May 2011, Howard Lapides, executive producer of Celebrity Rehab, joined the show as co-host when Woldman went on hiatus.

== Personal life ==
Barer has two children. Barer has spoken at events for Writers in Treatment, a nonprofit organization founded by Robert Downey Sr and Leonard Lee Buschel that provides assistance to writers who have problems related to substance abuse and addictive behaviors. He is the uncle of authors Lee Goldberg and Tod Goldberg. A cousin, Shlomo Barer, formerly with the BBC, is also an author of historical non-fiction. A distant relative, songwriter Marshall Barer, composed the "Mighty Mouse Theme (Here I Come to Save the Day)", and co-wrote the book and composed the lyrics for the musical Once Upon a Mattress. Two other distant relatives, Ariela Barer and Libe Barer, have appeared in various TV shows.
