= Roncalli (TV series) =

- Directed by: Michael Mackenroth
- Starring: Günther Maria Halmer; Günter Lamprecht; Eddie Constantine; Evelyn Hamann; Karin Boyd
- Country of origin: West Germany
- No. of episodes: 6

Roncalli was a German television series. It was the title of a six-part program that aired on ARD, with Günther Maria Halmer and Günter Lamprecht, which was produced for ARD from 1986 to 1987, in collaboration with Bernhard Paul and the artists of Circus Roncalli.

It was first broadcast on December 8, 1986.

== See also ==
- List of German television series
