= Man Overboard (book) =

- Author: Burl Barer
- Language: English
- Genre: Crime, Biography
- Publisher: Northwest Publishing
- Publication date: May 1995
- English publication date: May 1995
- Pages: 182 pp (Hardcover 1st ed)
- ISBN: 978-1434305602

Man Overboard: The Counterfeit Resurrection of Phil Champagne is a non-fiction biography and true crime book by author Burl Barer that was released in 1995 by Northwest Publishing. It is the story of Champagne's life after his faked death.

== Plot ==
Champagne, a construction developer, disappeared in 1982 while aboard a 45-foot yacht that was sailing off the Olympic Peninsula. He was presumed dead after a 13-hour search by the U.S. Coast Guard.

A $1.5 million life-insurance business policy, taken out by his brother as co-partner in a construction firm with Champagne, paid out $700,000 to his grieving family.

After the accident when Champagne realized everyone thought he had drowned, he stole the identity of Harold Stegeman, an 8-year-old boy who died in 1945. Champagne lived as Stegeman, a Washington restaurateur, for the next 10 years until his arrest for counterfeiting US currency in an Idaho garage. Champagne pleaded guilty to giving false statements during a bankruptcy hearing, a loan application and passport application. In addition, he served 21 months in federal prison for charges of counterfeiting and passport fraud.

Barer, an Edgar Award winner, profiles Champagne in Man Overboard, republished by Wild Blue Press in a 20th Anniversary Special Edition featuring a new preface by the author, a new afterword by Phil Champagne and several new photographs. Wild Blue Press also made available audiobook and electronic editions. The first page of the book includes a synopsis of how the new identity began:

"Phil Champagne died Aug. 31, 1982, in a tragic boating accident off Lopez Island, Washington. He was 52. Champagne was survived by his wife of 28 years, four grown children, an octogenarian mother and two despondent brothers. Phil didn’t know he was dead until he read it in the paper. All things considered, he took it pretty well."

== Awards and citations ==
In 1996, Man Overboard was a nominee for an Anthony Award in the Best Crime & Mystery Books of 1995 in the true crime category at the Bouchercon World Mystery Convention.

Man Overboard is included in the book The Essential Mystery Lists under "Best True Crime."
