= Out of My Mind (Duran Duran song) =

Single by Duran Duran

from the album Medazzaland and The Saint: Music from the Motion Picture
- B-side: "Silva Halo"; "Sinner or Saint"
- Released: 27 March 1997
- Genre: Alternative rock
- Length: 3:47 (single edit); 4:15 (album version)
- Label: Virgin; Capitol
- Songwriters: Nick Rhodes; Warren Cuccurullo; Simon Le Bon
- Producer: Duran Duran

Duran Duran singles chronology
"White Lines (Don't Do It)" (1995)	"Out of My Mind" (1997)	"Electric Barbarella" (1997)

Music video
- "Out of My Mind" on YouTube

"Out of My Mind" is a song by the English pop rock band Duran Duran. The song is part of their ninth album, Medazzaland (1997), but was released as a single from the soundtrack to the 1997 Val Kilmer film The Saint.

The single peaked at #21 on UK Singles Chart in May, at #6 in Israel and at #5 in Italy.

== Music video ==
The accompanying music video for "Out of My Mind" was filmed by director Dean Karr in February, at the historic Krumlov Castle in the city of Český Krumlov, in the Czech Republic. It featured many special effects, including the use of sophisticated prosthetic makeup to age singer Simon Le Bon over the course of the video.

== B-sides, bonus tracks and remixes ==
"Out of My Mind" featured the two B-sides "Sinner or Saint" (written specifically for the movie) and "Silva Halo", an album track from Medazzaland.

There were a multitude of remixes done for the track, mostly by the Perfecto crew (Paul Oakenfold and Steve Osborne). During 1997–2001 live performances, the band chose to perform the darker and more rock-oriented Perfecto version rather than the album version.

== Formats and track listings ==
- 7": Virgin / VSLH 1639 (Promo) United Kingdom
1. "Out of My Mind" (single edit) – 3:47
2. "Out of My Mind" (single edit) – 3:46
- 12": Virgin / VST 1639 United Kingdom
1. "Out of My Mind" (Perfecto mix) – 5:51
2. "Out of My Mind" (Perfecto instrumental) – 5:47
3. "Out of My Mind" (Perfecto dub 1) – 6:41
4. "Out of My Mind" (Perfecto dub 2) – 6:25
- 12": Virgin / VSTDJ 1639 (Promo) United Kingdom
1. "Out of My Mind" (Perfecto mix) – 5:45
2. "Out of My Mind" (Perfecto instrumental) – 5:45
3. "Out of My Mind" (Perfecto dub) – 6:44
4. "Out of My Mind" (Perfecto dub 2) – 6:28
- CD: Virgin / VSCDT 1639 United Kingdom
1. "Out of My Mind" (album version) – 4:15
2. "Silva Halo" – 2:24
3. "Sinner or Saint" – 4:06
4. "Out of My Mind" (Electric remix) – 4:25
- CD: Virgin / VSCDX 1639 United Kingdom
1. "Out of My Mind" (Perfecto radio edit) – 3:46
2. "Out of My Mind" (Perfecto mix) – 5:51
3. "Out of My Mind" (Perfecto instrumental) – 5:47
4. "Out of My Mind" (Perfecto dub 1) – 6:41
- Also issued under the "Duran 1" catalogue number
- CD: Virgin / DPRO-12236 (Promo) United Kingdom
1. "Out of My Mind" (single edit) – 3:47
2. "Out of My Mind" (album version) – 4:15
3. "Out of My Mind" (Saber radio remix) – 4:03
4. "Out of My Mind" (Metropolis remix) – 4:25
5. "Out of My Mind" (Call Out Research hook) – 0:10
- CD: Virgin / V25D-38586 United States
1. "Out of My Mind" (Metropolis remix) – 4:28
2. "Sinner or Saint" – 4:07
- CD: Virgin / DPRO-12236 (Promo) United States
1. "Out of My Mind" (single edit) – 3:47
2. "Out of My Mind" (album version) – 4:15
3. "Out of My Mind" (Saber radio remix) – 4:03
4. "Out of My Mind" (Metropolis remix) – 4:25
5. "Out of My Mind" (Call Out Research hook) – 0:10

== Personnel ==
Duran Duran

- Nick Rhodes – keyboards
- Simon Le Bon – vocals
- Warren Cuccurullo – guitar, bass

Additional musicians

- Dave DiCenso – live drums
- Talvin Singh – tabla and santoor

== Charts ==
Chart (1997)	Peak position
Australia (ARIA)	91
Canada Top Singles (RPM)	55
Israel (IBA)	6
Italy (Musica e dischi)	5
Italy Airplay (Music & Media)	8
Spain Airplay (Top 40 Radio)	33
UK Singles (OCC)	21
