= The Saint (Edwin Astley song) =

Theme of British television programme The Saint

"The Saint" is a theme tune for the British spy TV show of the same name composed first as a whistled melody by author Leslie Charteris himself, before being expanded by Edwin Astley 1962, and later Brian Dee, Irving Martin, and Orbital in television and film versions.

== Orbital version ==
"The Saint"

Single by Orbital

from the album The Saint: Music from the Motion Picture and In Sides (re-issue)
- B-side: "The Sinner"
- Released: 7 April 1997
- Length: 4:32
- Label: FFRR
- Songwriter: Edwin Astley
- Producer: P&P Hartnoll

Orbital singles chronology
"Satan Live" (1997)	"The Saint" (1997)	"Style" (1999)

English electronic music duo Orbital covered "The Saint" and released it as a single in April 1997. It is taken from the soundtrack to the film of the same name. The track is an updated version of Edwin Astley's theme music from the 1960s TV series The Saint and plays over a scene towards the end of the film. The single's B-side, "The Sinner", is an original composition developing elements of Orbital's arrangement from the A-side.

"The Saint" was one of Orbital's biggest hit singles. It reached number three in Iceland and on the UK Singles Chart, their highest-placing song on that chart along with "Satan Live". In Ireland it peaked at number seven, and in Finland it reached number eight. The single also sold well in North America, making it to number 15 on the Canadian Singles Chart and number four on the US Billboard Bubbling Under Hot 100. Despite its success, it is not included on any of Orbital's retrospective albums, though it did appear on some reissues of their 1996 album In Sides. It was included in Orbital's live set during Lollapalooza 1997 and that year's Phoenix Festival but has not been played live since.

=== Charts ===
==== Weekly charts ====
Chart (1997)	Peak position
Canada (Nielsen SoundScan)	15
Europe (Eurochart Hot 100)	21
Finland (Suomen virallinen lista)	8
Germany (GfK)	87
Iceland (Íslenski Listinn Topp 40)	3
Ireland (IRMA)	7
Scotland Singles (OCC)	4
Sweden (Sverigetopplistan)	34
UK Singles (OCC)	3
UK Dance (OCC)	3
US Bubbling Under Hot 100 (Billboard)	4

==== Year-end charts ====
Chart (1997)	Position
Iceland (Íslenski Listinn Topp 40)	82
UK Singles (OCC)	123

=== Release history ===
Region	Date	Format(s)	Label(s)	Ref.
United States	25 March 1997	Contemporary hit radio	FFRR	
United Kingdom	7 April 1997	12-inch vinyl; CD; cassette	FFRR	
Japan	25 May 1997	Mini-CD	FFRR; London	

== Other versions ==
- The Les Reed Brass – 1962
- Laurel Aitken – 1963
- The Eliminators – 1966
- Roland Shaw And His Orchestra – 1966
