= Satan Live =

1996 single by Orbital

Single by Orbital
- Released: 30 December 1996
- Length: 7:05
- Label: Internal
- Songwriter: P&P Hartnoll
- Producers: P&P Hartnoll

Orbital singles chronology
"The Box" (1996)	"Satan Live" (1996)	"The Saint" (1997)

"Satan Live" is a single by English electronic music duo Orbital. It contains various live recordings made by the group in 1996.

The song was single of the week in NME, and is one of Orbital's biggest hits, with the CD version reaching number three on the UK Singles Chart (their highest position on that chart alongside "The Saint") while the vinyl version, which overran the time limit for the singles chart, reached number 48 on the UK Albums Chart. In Ireland, the live version peaked at number seven.

== Original version ==
The original studio version of "Satan" was included on the III EP in 1990 and on the US version of the album Orbital. Issued as a single on 7 January 1990, the original version peaked at number 31 on the UK Singles Chart.

== "Evil Santa" ==
In December 1996, the promotional triple CD box set was called "Evil Santa", an anagram of Satan Live. All three releases in the series came in a standard CD-single jewel case. Each had a 6 on the inlay spine so the three together form the number "666".

== Track listings ==
CD1

1. "Satan" (live at the Irving Plaza, New York) – 7:12
2. "Out There Somewhere" (live at the Irving Plaza, New York) – 17:46

CD2

1. "Satan" (live at the V96 Festival, Chelmsford) – 7:41
2. "Lush 3" (live at Axis Boston) – 7:31
3. "The Girl with the Sun in Her Head" (live at Axis Boston) – 7:45

CD3

1. "Satan" (Industry Standard edit - studio version) – 3:44
2. "Chime (live at the V96 Festival, Chelmsford) – 7:05
3. "Impact" (live at the V96 Festival, Chelmsford) – 12:52

Double 12-inch pack

Side A:

1. "Satan" (live at the V96 Festival, Chelmsford) – 7:41

Side B:

1. "Chime" (live at the V96 Festival, Chelmsford) – 7:05
2. "Impact" (live at the V96 Festival, Chelmsford) – 12:52

Side C:

1. "Lush 3" (live at Axis Boston) – 7:31
2. "The Girl with the Sun in Her Head" (live at Axis Boston) – 7:45

Side D:

1. "Out There Somewhere" (live at the Irving Plaza, New York) – 17:46
2. "Choice" (live at the Irving Plaza, New York) – 5:12

"Irving Plaza" is misspelt as "Irvine Plaza" on the single. While the CD singles have crowd noise mixed in, the double 12-inch pack features no crowd noise.

== Charts ==
=== Weekly charts ===
Original version

Chart (1990)	Peak position
Europe (Eurochart Hot 100)	92
UK Singles (Official Charts)	31

"Satan Live"

Chart (1997)	Peak position
Europe (Eurochart Hot 100)	15
Ireland (IRMA)	7
Scottish Singles Sales (Official Charts)	4
Scottish Albums (Official Charts) Vinyl version	85
UK Singles (Official Charts)	3
UK Albums (Official Charts) Vinyl version	48

=== Year-end charts ===
"Satan Live"

Chart (1997)	Position
UK Singles (OCC)	134

== Release history ==
Region	Version	Date	Format(s)	Label(s)	Ref.
United Kingdom	Original version/III EP	7 January 1991	7-inch vinyl; 12-inch vinyl; CD; cassette	FFRR	
United Kingdom	Original version/III EP	28 January 1991	12-inch remix vinyl	FFRR	
Australia	Original version/III EP	13 May 1991	7-inch vinyl; 12-inch vinyl; cassette	FFRR; London	
United Kingdom	"Satan Live"	30 December 1996	CD	Internal	
