= Body count =

Number of people killed in an event

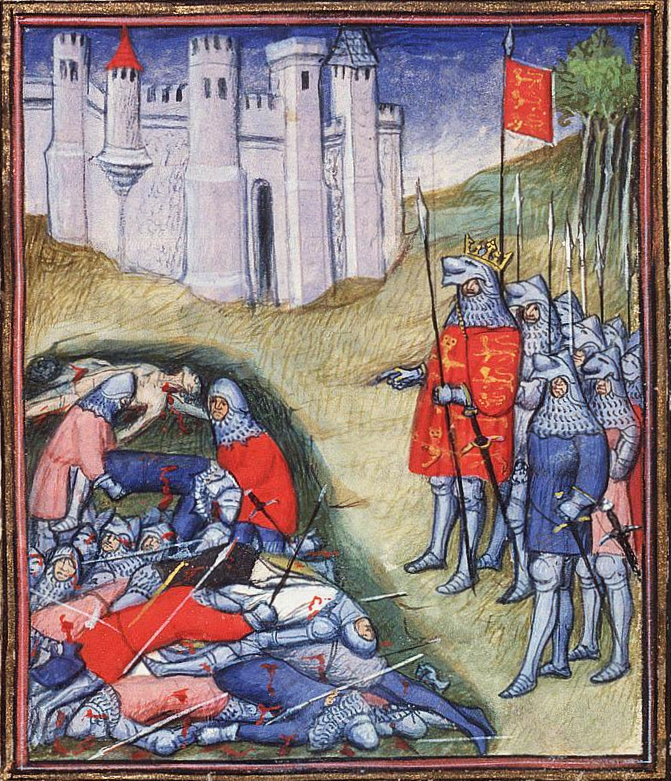
Edward III's herald, the crowned king of arms, counting the dead after the battle of Crécy

A body count is the total number of people killed in a particular event. In combat, a body count is often based on the number of confirmed kills, but occasionally only an estimate. Often used in reference to military combat, the term can also refer to any situation involving multiple killings, such as the actions of death squads or serial killers.

The military gathers such figures for a variety of reasons, such as determining the need for continuing operations, estimating efficiency of new and old weapons systems, and planning follow-up operations.

The term has since been used to describe the number of sexual partners a person has engaged with.

== Military use ==
"Body count" figures have a long history in military planning and propaganda.

=== Sassanian Empire ===
According to Procopius, when the Persians were about to march to a war, the king would sit on the throne and many baskets would be set before him. The men of the army would pass along the baskets one by one, each throwing one arrow in the baskets, which would then be sealed with the king's seal. When the army returned to Persia, each man would take an arrow from the baskets, and the number of casualties would be determined by the number of remaining arrows.

=== The Holocaust ===
During the Holocaust in Russia, Belarus, Ukraine and other eastern areas, killing was done by Nazi Germany's military police forces, including Einsatzgruppen, the SD, and Wehrmacht police battalions, in massacres by shooting the victims. Such units measured their progress by counting the number of people killed. And the number of killed people was 1.5 million Jews. These murder operations took place under the guise of anti-partisan warfare, but in reality few of those killed were actually partisans.

=== Vietnam War ===
Since the goal of the United States in the Vietnam War was not to conquer North Vietnam but rather to ensure the survival of the South Vietnamese government, measuring progress was difficult. All the contested territory was theoretically "held" already. Instead, the U.S. Army used body counts to show that the U.S. was winning the war, leading to falsified and inflated enemy body count numbers. The Army's theory was that eventually, the Vietcong and North Vietnamese Army would lose after the attrition warfare.

Historian Christian Appy states "search and destroy was the principal tactic; and the enemy body count was the primary measure of progress" in the US strategy of attrition. Search and destroy was a term to describe operations aimed at flushing the Viet Cong out of hiding, while body count was the measuring stick for operation success. Appy claims that American commanders exaggerated body counts by 100 percent. This method was controversial, due to two issues. The first is regarding the counting of unarmed civilians killed in actions as enemy combatants in free-fire zone. Guenter Lewy estimated that 1/3 of those counted as "enemy KIA" in US/ARVN battlefield operations reports were civilians. He suggests that this would be 220,000 civilian deaths miscounted as "enemy KIA". Another issue is inflation and fabrication of body count in after-action reports, which is reported to have given false and inaccurate casualty figures for enemy dead.

=== Rhodesian Bush War ===
During the Rhodesian Bush War the Rhodesian Security Forces were focused on achieving a high 'kill rate' against the communist guerrilla forces. While this motivated the Rhodesian personnel to kill large numbers of guerrillas, it may have led them to attack civilians and murder prisoners. The emphasis on the 'kill rate' may have partly been the result of the influence of American and Australian Vietnam War veterans who volunteered to fight for Rhodesia.

=== Iraq War ===
In the 2003 invasion of Iraq, the US military adopted an official policy of not counting deaths. General Tommy Franks' statement that "we don't do body counts" was widely reported. Critics claimed that Franks was only attempting to evade bad publicity, while supporters pointed to the failure of body counts to give an accurate impression of the state of the war in Vietnam. At the end of October 2005, it became public that the US military had been counting Iraqi fatalities since January 2004 but only those killed by insurgents and not those killed by the US forces.

== Slang usage ==
The term "body count" has been used as a euphemistic slang term for how many people one has had sex with. This usage gained further popularity in 2020 on the social media app TikTok, where users would ask strangers what their "body count" was.

== See also ==
- Casualty estimation
- Casualty prediction
- Loss exchange ratio

== Bibliography ==
- Beorn, Waitman Wade (2014). Marching into darkness : the Wehrmacht and the Holocaust in Belarus. Cambridge, Massachusetts: Harvard University Press. ISBN 9780674726604.
- U.S. Army War College, Study on Military Professionalism, 1970
