= Patrick McAlinney =

Irish actor (1913–1990)

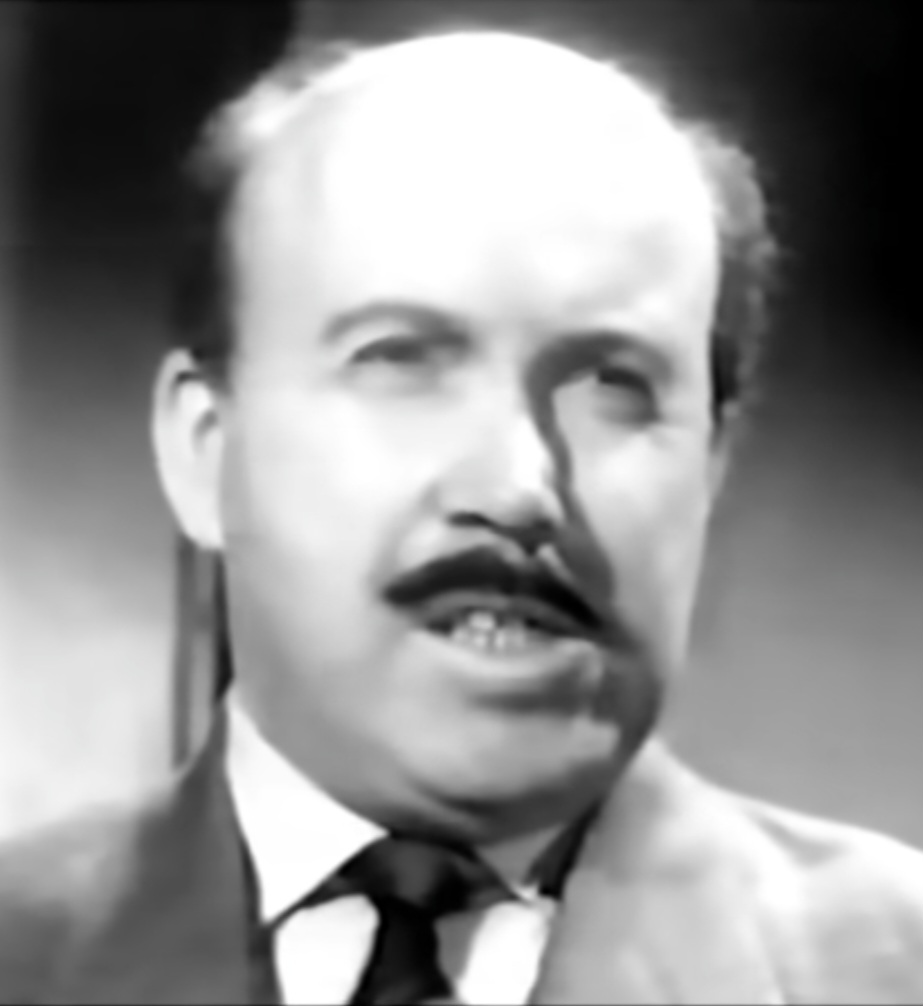
- McAlinney in an episode of One Step Beyond (1961)
- Born: 9 November 1913; Lammy, Omagh, County Tyrone, Ireland
- Died: 22 August 1990 (aged 76); UK
- Occupation: Actor

Patrick Andrew McAlinney (9 November 1913 – 22 August 1990) was an Irish character actor who starred in many British dramas and sitcoms. His most memorable roles included a brother on the hit sitcom Oh, Brother!, which starred Derek Nimmo, Mr. O'Reilly in The Tomorrow People and Dr. Daley in Bless Me, Father.

His stage work included the original production of Thornton Wilder's The Matchmaker in London's West End, and its subsequent fourteen month Broadway run, in 1945–1947.

== Early life ==
Patrick Andrew "Paddy" McAlinney was born in Lammy near Omagh, County Tyrone, Ireland on 9 November 1913; he was the son of farmer Patrick McAlinney and Anastasia O'Neill.

== Filmography ==
Film
Year	Title	Role	Notes
1952	Time Gentlemen, Please!	Rev. Soater	
1953	The Oracle	O'Keefe	
1954	Happy Ever After	O'Connor	
1958	A Night to Remember	Mr. James Farrell	
1958	She Didn't Say No!	Matthew Hogan	
1959	Shake Hands with the Devil	Donovan, bartender	
1959	Alive and Kicking	Policeman	
1961	Return of a Stranger	Whittaker	
1961	Tarnished Heroes	Reilly	
1962	The Pot Carriers	Dillon	
1963	The Gentle Terror	Sam	
1971	Revenge	George	
1971	Danger Point	Mate	
1972	The Boy Who Turned Yellow	Supreme Beefeater	
1976	The Omen	Photographer	
Television
Year	Title	Role	Notes
1965	The Human Jungle	Scollick	Episode: The 24-Hour Man
1973	Special Branch	Father McMahon	Series 3, Episode 13: Blueprint for Murder
1976	Kizzy	Peters	All episodes (1-6)
