= The Saint (novel) =

Mystery novel by Burl Barer

The Saint (novelization)
- Paperback edition by Pocket Books. Val Kilmer pictured.
- Author: Burl Barer based upon the character by Leslie Charteris and the screenplay by Jonathan Hensleigh and Wesley Strick
- Language: English
- Series: The Saint
- Genre: Mystery, Novelization
- Publisher: Pocket Books
- Publication date: 1997
- Publication place: United States
- Media type: Print (Paperback)
- ISBN: 0-671-00951-6
- OCLC: 36527456
- Preceded by: Salvage for the Saint
- Followed by: Capture the Saint

The Saint is a mystery novel by Burl Barer published by Pocket Books in 1997. It was based upon the screenplay for the film The Saint, which in turn was loosely based upon the character Simon Templar, created by Leslie Charteris. Val Kilmer portrayed Templar and is pictured on the book's front cover.

This was the first book featuring Templar since Salvage for the Saint ended the original series of books (which began in 1928) in 1983. It is also the first Saint story to be published since Charteris' death in 1993 and the first to not be published by either Hodder & Stoughton (UK) or The Crime Club (US).

Barer wrote the book based upon the screenplay by Jonathan Hensleigh and Wesley Strick. Barer himself is a longtime fan of the Saint books and in 1993 had published a comprehensive study on the many literary, radio, and television stories featuring the character of Simon Templar. Barer uses as a framing sequence around his historical work then-current plans to launch a new film series based upon the Saint; these plans ultimately failed and the 1997 film resulted.

The film only loosely adapted the Simon Templar character, making many wholesale changes to the concept of The Saint and Templar; Barer nonetheless incorporated elements from Charteris into his manuscript, including characters from past Saint books such as Roger Conway. Barer would go on to write an original Saint novel (more closely related to the character) entitled Capture the Saint, which was also published in 1997.
