= Günther Maria Halmer =

German actor (1943–2026)

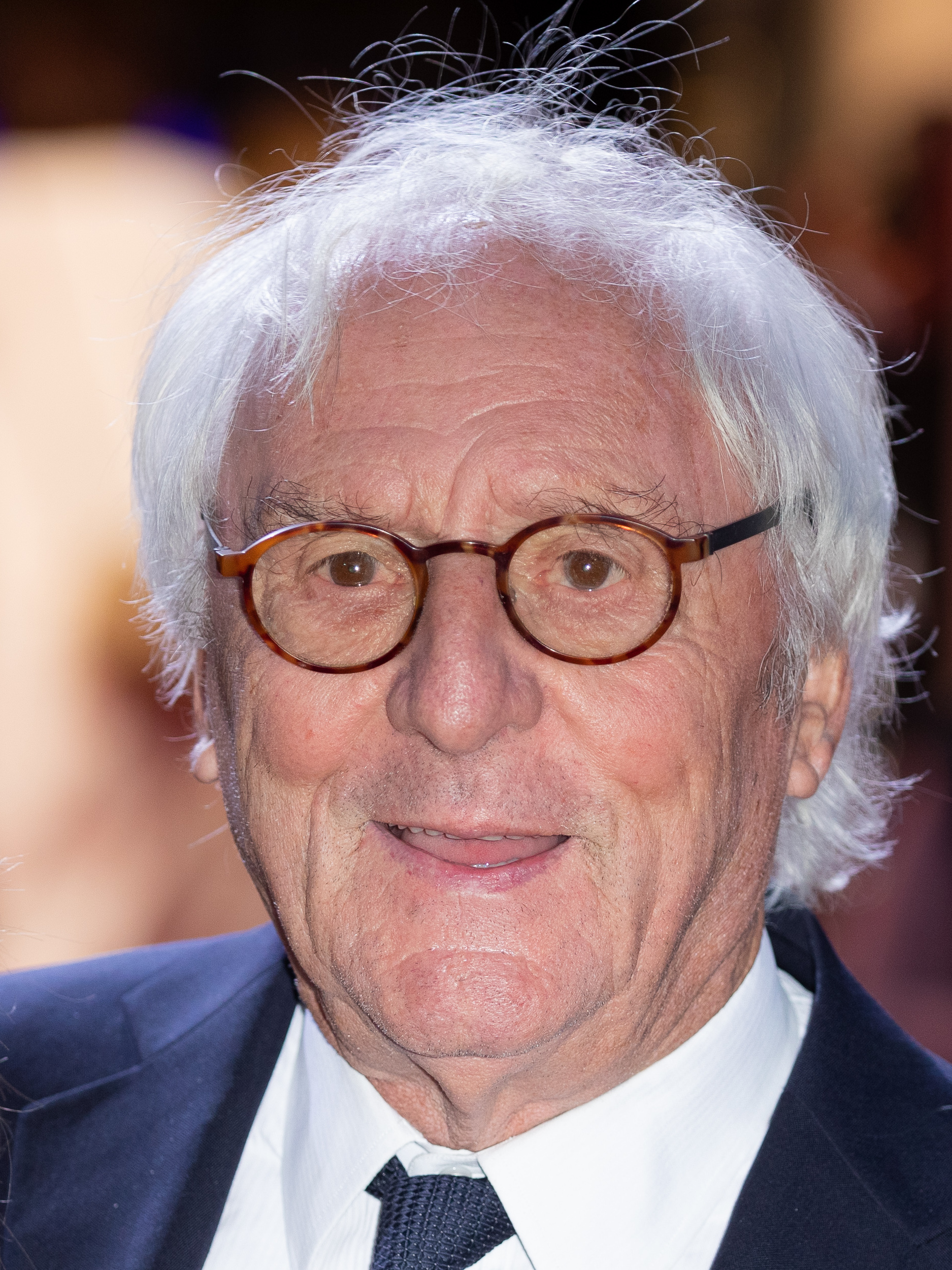
- Halmer in 2019
- Born: 5 January 1943; Rosenheim, Gau Munich-Upper Bavaria, Germany
- Died: 10 May 2026 (aged 83)
- Education: Otto Falckenberg School of the Performing Arts
- Occupation: Actor

Günther Maria Halmer (5 January 1943 – 10 May 2026) was a German actor.

In addition to his acting career, he was a philanthropist for SOS Children's Villages.

Halmer died of cancer on 10 May 2026, at the age of 83.

== Filmography ==
- Münchner Geschichten (1974–1975, TV series, 9 episodes), as Charlie Häusler
- 21 Hours at Munich (1976, TV film), as Andre Spitzer
- Der Alte (1977, 2008, TV series, 2 episodes)
- Derrick: Karo As (1979, TV series episode), as Jochen Karo
- Caleb Williams (1980, TV miniseries), as Falkland
- Berlin Tunnel 21 (1981, TV film), as Mr. Klemnitz
- Gandhi (1982), as Hermann Kallenbach
- Sophie's Choice (1982), as Rudolf Höss
- Peter the Great (1986, TV miniseries), as Pyotr Tolstoy
- Tatort: Riedmüller, Vorname Sigi (1986, TV series episode), as Kriminalhauptkommissar Siegfried Riedmüller
- Roncalli (1986–1987, TV series, 6 episodes), as Bruno Roncalli
- The Second Victory (1987), as Rudi Winkler
- Lenin...The Train (1988, TV film), as Captain von Planetz
- War and Remembrance (1988–1989, TV miniseries), as Rudolf Höss
- Anwalt Abel (1988–2001, TV series, 20 episodes), as Jean Abel
- Bangkok Story (1989), as Dombrowsky
- The Nightmare Years (1989, TV miniseries), as Kellenbach
- Abraham's Gold (1990), as Karl Lechner
- The Saint: Wrong Number (1990, TV series episode), as Otto Schmidt
- The Mysteries of the Dark Jungle (1992, TV miniseries), as Stefan Krüger
- The First Circle (1992, TV film), as Vladimir Chelnov
- The Democratic Terrorist (1992), as Colonel May
- L'Atlantide (1992), as Bielowsky
- Projekt Aphrodite (1992, TV miniseries), as Professor Dr. Günther Hartig
- By Way of the Stars (1992–1993, TV miniseries), as Heinrich von Knabig
- The Lucona Affair (1993), as Captain Leuwen
- Candles in the Dark (1993, TV film), as Pastor Harma
- A Case for Two (1994–2005, TV series, 4 episodes)
- Trennungsfieber (2000, TV film), as Fritz Bauer
- The State I Am In (2000), as Klaus
- Amen. (2002), as F. K. Otto Dibelius
- Bis dass dein Tod uns scheidet (2002, TV film), as Gunnar Mosbach
- Heart or Cash (2002, TV film), as Carl Morus
- Mörderherz (2002, TV film), as Daniel Elsner
- Mann gesucht, Liebe gefunden (2003, TV film), as Wieland Busch
- Die Konferenz (2004, TV film), as Holger Stubenrauch
- Liebe hat Vorfahrt (2005, TV film), as Alain Mayer
- Agathe kann's nicht lassen: Das Mörderspiel (2007, TV series episode), as Gregor Moll
- Oh Tannenbaum (2007, TV film), as Peter Wagner
- Liebe für Fortgeschrittene (2008, TV film), as Otto Frank
- Der Kriminalist: Unter Freunden (2008, TV series episode), as Gonzo Schilling
- Zwei übern Berg (2012, TV film), as Alfons Keilinger
- The Perjured Farmer (2012, TV film), as Franz Bruckner
- Welcome to the Countryside! (2013, TV film), as Leo
- Family Party (2015, TV film), as Hannes Westhoff
- Prinzessin Maleen (2015, TV film), as Prince Theodor
- My Parent's Wedding (2016, TV film), as Peter
- The Garden (2017), as Erich
- Love in Persian (2018, TV film), as Achim Leitner
- Remember Me (2023), as Günter
