= Casualty estimation =

Casualty estimation refers to the process of statistically estimating the number of people killed, injured, or otherwise harmed in an event when complete records are unavailable. The term casualty is used in both military and civilian contexts and may apply to a range of events, including armed conflict, natural disasters, and accidents.

A range of approaches can be employed, including direct documentation, survey-based methods, and statistical modeling, depending on the availability and reliability of data.

== Related concepts ==
Approaches based on the systematic documentation of individual deaths became known as casualty recording in the early twenty-first century. A related concept, casualty prediction, is the process of estimating the number of injuries or deaths that might occur in a planned or potential battle or natural disaster.

== Methods ==
Methods of casualty estimation vary depending on the institutional context, the scale of the event, and the availability and reliability of data.

=== Armed conflicts ===
In armed conflicts, when complete reporting is unavailable or unreliable, researchers and analysts often combine multiple partial sources, triangulate reports, and use complementary estimation methods to infer total deaths and injuries.

A variety of approaches have been described, including:

- Reported number of kills
- Number of enemy individual weapons captured after engagement
- Number of tanks and aircraft lost
- Remote sensing of mass graves

Measurement and signature intelligence alone cannot give a reasonable estimate of casualties. What Spectroscopic MASINT can do is help find mass graves. Geophysical MASINT can help localize metal and possibly bodies at that site. TECHINT is needed if there are weapons or artifacts to analyze. IMINT has a role to play in tracking movements. These all have to combine with all-source analysis. Perhaps the losses of tanks and aircraft, if available, might better predict what actually happened in a battle. MASINT's mass graves capability is a means that has been used for remote sensing of clandestine mass graves.

Author Sam Adams' book, War of Numbers discusses, in great detail, a process of casualty estimation. Adams was a CIA analyst who eventually resigned over what he felt was political manipulation of casualty figures in the Vietnam War. He explains how he came up with casualty figures for the NLF and PAVN. Adams, and other U.S. analysts dealing with a guerilla war in the jungle, found there were better metrics than "body count". David Hackworth, for example, used a number of enemy weapons captured after an engagement, and that turned out to be a good predictor of casualties, with certain limits.

=== Natural disasters and public health emergencies ===
In natural disasters and public health emergencies, where humanitarian assistance is required, casualty estimation may rely on direct documentation and population-based data collection, including the following methods:

- Retrospective household surveys
- Prospective community surveillance systems
- Verbal autopsy methods
- Key informant interviews
- Statistical modeling and capture–recapture techniques

==== Earthquakes ====
Rapid loss estimation systems such as the United States Geological Survey's PAGER combine early seismic measurements with information on population exposure and vulnerability to produce preliminary estimates of potential casualties and impacts, guiding emergency response when detailed information is not yet available.

== See also ==
- Body count
- Casualty prediction
- Loss exchange ratio
