= Body Count (book) =

2012 true crime book by Burl Barer

- Author: Burl Barer
- Language: English
- Genre: Nonfiction/True crime
- Publisher: Pinnacle Books
- Publication date: 2012 (2nd ed), 2002
- Publication place: United States
- Media type: Print (paperback), e-book
- Pages: 256 pp
- ISBN: 978-0786029273
- OCLC: 2003271224
- Dewey Decimal: 364.15/23/0979737
- LC Class: HV6533.W2 B37 2002

Body Count: The Terrifying True Story of the Spokane Serial Killer is a non-fiction book released in December 2012 by Pinnacle Books and written by the crime writer Burl Barer about the American serial killer Robert Lee Yates from Spokane, Washington. It was first published in 2002, and then updated and re-released 10 years later.

== Storyline ==
Robert Lee Yates, Jr. was the father of five, an Air National Guard pilot who served in Desert Storm, and someone no one suspected as a killer. But at night, he prowled the streets where prostitutes gathered. The book follows the four-year investigation, describing it as a "process of elimination" to solve it. The book covers how Yates was finally caught and the effect Yates's double life had on his family.

After a trial in 2002, Yates was convicted of killing two women and sentenced to death. In 2000, he pleaded guilty to 13 other murders and was given a sentence of 408 years.

The author appeared in 2010 on BlogTalkRadio's "True Murder" show to talk about the book and the lengthy investigation, telling radio host Dan Zupansky that he gained access to the law enforcement task force that gave him a behind-the-scenes look to the investigation."

Barer had a personal connection to the killer, as Yates's first victims were friends of the author's family in Walla Walla, Washington.
