= The Saint (soundtrack) =

The Saint: Music from the Motion Picture

Soundtrack album by various artists
- Released: 25 March 1997
- Genre: Electronica; alternative rock
- Label: Virgin

Singles from The Saint (soundtrack)
- 1. "The Saint Theme" Released: 7 April 1997

The Saint: Music from the Motion Picture Soundtrack is the soundtrack to the 1997 movie The Saint.

The soundtrack features prominent musical artists from the late 1990s, including Duran Duran, Sneaker Pimps, Orbital, Moby, Fluke, Luscious Jackson, The Chemical Brothers, Underworld, Daft Punk, David Bowie, Superior, Dreadzone, Duncan Sheik, and Everything but the Girl. The album also includes an updated version of the theme music from the 1960s television series.

"You're All I've Got Tonight," written by Ric Ocasek and performed by The Smashing Pumpkins, is part of the movie, but not included on the soundtrack album.

== Critical reception ==
Professional ratings
Review scores
Source	Rating
AllMusic	4.5/5 stars
Entertainment Weekly	A−

AllMusic's Stephen Thomas Erlewine praised it for being "a surprisingly effective and useful collection of electronica, offering a good overview and introduction to many of the genre's biggest artists", despite a "few mediocre cuts" from Superior and Duran Duran, concluding that "on the whole, it's one of the few soundtracks that works better as an album than as a movie." David Browne of Entertainment Weekly called it a "consistent, multitextured collection", concluding that: "Even with melodramatic synthpop by Duncan Sheik and Duran Duran, The Saint Music From the Motion Picture Soundtrack is as moody and alluring as ol' Val himself."

== Track listing ==
American release
No.	Title	Artist	Length
1.	"The Saint Theme"	Orbital	4:32
2.	"6 Underground (Nellee Hooper Edit)"	Sneaker Pimps	3:53
3.	"Oil 1"	Moby	5:31
4.	"Atom Bomb"	Fluke	3:54
5.	"Roses Fade (Mojo Mix)"	Luscious Jackson	2:31
6.	"Setting Sun (Instrumental)"	The Chemical Brothers	7:00
7.	"Pearl's Girl"	Underworld	9:32
8.	"Out of My Mind"	Duran Duran	4:16
9.	"Da Funk"	Daft Punk	5:28
10.	"Dead Man Walking"	David Bowie	6:50
11.	"Polaroid Millenium"	Superior	3:21
12.	"A Dream Within a Dream"	Dreadzone	6:08
13.	"In the Absence of Sun"	Duncan Sheik	5:04
14.	"Before Today"	Everything but the Girl	4:17

European release
No.	Title	Artist	Length
10.	"Little Wonder (Danny Saber Dance Mix)"	David Bowie	5:30

== Charts ==
=== Weekly charts ===
Chart (1997)	Peak position
Hungarian Albums (MAHASZ)	18
