= David Ryall =

English actor (1935–2014)

- Ryall in Inspector Morse
- Born: David John Ryall; 5 January 1935; Shoreham-by-Sea, Sussex, England
- Died: 25 December 2014 (aged 79); London, England
- Years active: 1969–2014
- Spouses: Gillian Eddison (m. 1964; div. 1984) Cathy Buchwald (m. 1985; div. 2001) Penny England (m. 2003)
- Children: 3

David John Ryall (5 January 1935 – 25 December 2014) was an English stage, film and television actor. He had leading roles in Lytton's Diary and Goodnight Sweetheart, as well as memorable roles in Dennis Potter's The Singing Detective and Andrew Davies's adaptation of To Play the King. He also portrayed Billy Buzzle in the ITV sitcom Bless Me, Father and Grandad Frank in the BBC sitcom Outnumbered.

== Early life ==
Born in Shoreham-by-Sea, Sussex, Ryall was educated at Shoreham and Wallington grammar schools. He received a scholarship to the Royal Academy of Dramatic Art in 1962; during this time, he won the Caryl Brahms Award for a Musical.

== Career ==
On leaving RADA, Ryall went into repertory theatre in Salisbury, Bristol, Leicester and Birmingham (including King Lear and The Master Builder) and then into Laurence Olivier's company with the National Theatre at the Old Vic from 1965 to 1973. During this time he was involved with many new and influential plays, including Tom Stoppard's Rosencrantz and Guildenstern are Dead and Jumpers, Peter Shaffer's The Royal Hunt of the Sun and Adrian Mitchell's Tyger. Other work at the National Theatre include Guys and Dolls, The Beggar's Opera, Coriolanus (for which he won the Clarence Derwent Award in 1985) and Animal Farm, The School for Wives, Wild Oats, Democracy and The UN Inspector. In 1979, Ryall played a small role as a mechanic in the episode Earnshaw Strikes Back in the long running BBC series Last of the Summer Wine. In 1983, he worked on A Matter of the Officers and Jean Seberg with Julian Barry, who remained a lifelong friend. In 1984, Ryall performed a one-man show of stories and poems by Edward Bond at the NT, titled A Leap in the Light.

Ryall portrayed discredited scientist Frank Skuse in the March 1990 docudrama Who Bombed Birmingham?.

In 1994, Ryall played Feste in Sir Peter Hall's production of Twelfth Night – a performance that was praised highly by Sir Alec Guinness in his autobiography. In 1996–97, working with the Royal Shakespeare Company, he played God in The Mysteries, and Polonius in Hamlet, for which he was nominated for the Helen Hayes Award during its tour of the United States.

Ryall worked with Sir Peter Hall again in the 1999 production of Lenny in the West End, and after that in the 2000 epic Tantalus, in Colorado and the UK. Ryall continued to be a regular face in the theatre, with appearances in Patrick Marber's Don Juan in Soho at the Donmar Warehouse in 2007.

Ryall's television and film career include The Knowledge, The Singing Detective, Shelley, Inspector Morse,Heartbeat, Doc Martin, Midsomer Murders, Bertie and Elizabeth, Juliet Bravo, Down to Earth, Foyle's War, Plotlands, State of Play, The Elephant Man, Truly, Madly, Deeply, Black Beauty and Two Men Went to War. He appeared as Max, an antiques collector, in episode 4 of BBC drama Bonekickers.

In 2005, Ryall played the role of Winston Churchill in the French television drama Le Grand Charles, based on the life of Charles de Gaulle.

Ryall appeared in the BBC One sitcom Outnumbered from 2007 to 2011, in which he played Frank Morrison (known as "Grandad"), a character with dementia. The character appeared in series 1 and 2. Ryall reprised his role in the Christmas specials in 2009 and 2011. On 26 December 2016 the Christmas special was dedicated to his memory.

In 2010, Ryall portrayed Elphias Doge in Harry Potter and the Deathly Hallows – Part 1.

Ryall appeared as Dr Rant in the BBC One adaptation of the M. R. James ghost story The Tractate Middoth as part of the 2013 edition of A Ghost Story for Christmas. He also appeared briefly in 2013 as an old soldier in the BBC Drama Our Girl starring Lacey Turner, and he was cast in the BBC Drama The Village as Old Bert, Britain's oldest man who recounts his long life through a series of flashbacks.

Ryall's last appearance was in Call the Midwife, in which he played Tommy Mills. This episode was aired on BBC One on 1 March 2015 and was dedicated to his memory in the closing credits.

== Personal life ==
Ryall had one son, Jonathan (1966), and one daughter, Imogen (1967), born from his first wife, Gillian Edison, and another daughter, Charlie (1986), from his second wife, Cathy Buchwald. He died on 25 December 2014 aged 79.

== Filmography ==
- The Dance of Death (1969) – Sentry
- Black Joy (1977) – Butcher
- Love for Lydia (1977, TV Series) – Bretherton
- Some Mothers Do 'Ave 'Em Mr Ryford (1978 TV series)
- Enemy at the Door (1978–1980, TV Series) – Capt. Tom Foster-Smythe
- Bless Me, Father (1978–1981, TV Series) – Billy Buzzle
- The Knowledge (1979) – Titanic
- The Elephant Man (1980) – Man With Whores
- Fords on Water (1983) – Mister Jack
- Jack the Ripper (1988, TV Series) – Bowyer
- The Bill series 5 (1989) – Mr. Jacobs
- The Saint: The Brazilian Connection (1989, TV film) – Teal
- The Saint: The Software Murders (1989, TV film) – Teal
- The Woman in Black (1989) – Sweetman
- Wilt (1990) – Rev. Froude
- Truly, Madly, Deeply (1990) – George
- The Russia House (1990) – Colonial Type
- Shelley (1990–1992, TV Series) – Ted Bishop
- Goodnight Sweetheart (1993 - TV series) - Eric Elward, All 6 episodes series 1
- Shuttlecock (1993) – Pound
- Justice (1993) – English Minister
- Black Beauty (1994) – Carriagemaker
- Giorgino (1994) – Professor Beaumont
- Carrington (1995) – Mayor
- Restoration (1995) – Lord Bathurst
- Mad Cows (1999) – Man outside Harrods
- Unconditional Love (2002) – Funeral Director
- Two Men Went to War (2002) – Winston Churchill
- Blackball (2003) – Giles Wilton
- Around the World in 80 Days (2004) – Lord Salisbury
- The League of Gentlemen's Apocalypse (2005) – Tom Tit
- Doc Martin ep. – "Happily Ever After" (2007) – Drunk Vicar
- City of Ember (2008) – Chief Builder
- Midsomer Murders ep. – "Small Mercies" (2009) – Bob Moss
- Harry Potter and the Deathly Hallows – Part 1 (2010) – Elphias Doge
- Hysteria (2011) – Judge
- Trollied (2011–2012, TV series) – Vic
- Quartet (2012) – Harry
- A Ghost Story for Christmas: The Tractate Middoth (2013) – Dr. Rant
- Mr. Turner (2014) – Footman
- Autómata (2014) – Dominic Hawk
- Call the Midwife (2015, series 4, episode 7) – Tommy Mills (final appearance)
