= The Saint's Double Trouble =

- Original cinema poster
- Directed by: Jack Hively
- Written by: Ben Holmes; Leslie Charteris (story and characters)
- Produced by: Cliff Reid
- Starring: George Sanders; Bela Lugosi
- Cinematography: J. Roy Hunt
- Edited by: Theron Warth; Desmond Marquette
- Music by: Roy Webb
- Production company: RKO Radio Pictures
- Release date: January 26, 1940
- Running time: 67 minutes
- Country: United States
- Language: English

The Saint's Double Trouble is a 1940 action-adventure film produced by RKO Pictures. The film stars George Sanders as Simon Templar, a.k.a. "The Saint", a master criminal turned crime-fighter, and features horror film legend Bela Lugosi as "The Partner". This was the fourth of eight films in RKO's film series about the character created by Leslie Charteris, and the first film to not be directly based upon one of the original Saint books, although Charteris did contribute to developing the story for the film.

In this production, Sanders plays a dual role, not only that of Templar but of his doppelgänger, Duke Bates. When Bates is spotted smuggling diamonds into the US, Templar is blamed for the crime.

Co-starring in the film is Helene Whitney as love interest Anne Bitts, and Jonathan Hale as Insp. Henry Farnack.

== Plot summary ==
An authentic mummy is packaged and shipped from Cairo to Professor Horatio Bitts in Philadelphia. The package is sent under the name Simon Templar, but the sender is a man called The Partner, who is a member of an international team of jewel thieves, led by Boss Duke Bates.

Meanwhile, John Bohlen of the Philadelphia Police Department is visited by Inspector Henry Fernack from New York. Bates himself, posing as Templar due to their uncanny resemblance, comes to visit Professor Bitts and gathers some of the smuggled diamonds. Later that night, the police are called to the professor's home to investigate a homicide committed by Bates as he left.

Fernack and Bohlen arrive at the crime scene and suspect Simon Templar of the killing, since Bates planted one of Templar's calling cards on the dead body. Knowing that he is a suspect, Templar has to stay away from the police, but he still visits Inspector Fernack at his hotel late at night. Fernack tells Templar that he personally does not suspect him. Templar goes back to the crime scene, talks to Anne, daughter of the professor, and has a closer look at the mummy.

Templar has no idea that Boss Duke Bates is his spitting image as yet. When Boss kills another man, one of his fences, Templar manages to find his hideout at the 4 Bells Café and finds out about his doppelganger. After Boss finds out that one of the jewel packages is still inside the mummy, he goes back to the professor's house, but the professor crosses his path and is murdered by Boss.

Templar sends a message to the police and Anne, alerting them of Boss' existence and of the café. Boss tries to kill Anne but Templar arrives just in time to save her life. Then he goes back to the 4 Bells Café, but is caught by Boss and his henchmen, bound and gagged. Boss plans to kill him and transports him to a boat nearby to get rid of the body afterwards.

Before Boss has time to kill Templar, the police arrive and arrest Boss, presuming he is Templar. When they have gone, Templar manages to free himself and escape from the boat. He dresses up as a woman to get into the jail where Boss is held, and lets Boss knock him out and steal his disguise in order to escape; Boss is shot and killed fleeing the jail. Fernack realizes that Boss was Templar's double and lets him run after he has returned the stolen jewels he found in the mummy.

== Cast ==
- George Sanders in a dual role as both Simon Templar and Boss Duke Bates
- Helene Whitney as Anne Bitts
- Jonathan Hale as Inspector Henry Fernack
- Bela Lugosi as The Partner
- Donald MacBride as Chief of Detectives John H. Bohlen
- John F. Hamilton as Limpy, a Henchman
- Thomas W. Ross as Professor Horatio T. Bitts
