= Casualty prediction =

Science of predicting numbers of deaths or injuries

Casualty prediction is the science of predicting the number of deaths or injuries that may result from an epidemic, natural disaster or act of war such as the explosion of a nuclear weapon, chemical weapon or biological weapon. (Casualty estimation is the process of estimating the number of injuries or deaths in a battle or natural disaster that has already occurred.)

The New York University Large Scale Emergency Readiness Project applies agent-based modelling to simulate the effects of a large-scale disaster. Their initial project focused on modelling a 1998 Brazilian food-poisoning incident involving 8,000 injuries and 16 deaths.

Blast casualty prediction is routinely performed in the planning of military operations. For example, a cruise missile attack was considered by the United States in 1998 for Tarnak Farms in order to kill Osama bin Laden. However, not enough was known about the collateral damage effects of cruise missiles on mud huts. At the time there were estimated to be 100 women and children in the area, and in order to spare these civilians, the attack was not approved.

== See also ==
- Casualty estimation
- Civilian casualties
- Emergency management
