= Simon Dutton =

English actor

- Born: Simon Dutton; 1 January 1958 (age 68); England
- Occupation: Actor

Simon Dutton (born 1 January 1958) is a British actor from England, best known for playing the title role of Simon Templar (alias the Saint) in a series of internationally produced television films in 1989. In 2007, he joined the cast of British sitcom Not Going Out as recurring character Guy, but was written out at the end of series two.

Dutton has been married twice, firstly to Betsy Brantley and after to Tamsin Olivier. Both marriages ended in divorce.

== Filmography ==
=== Film ===
Year	Title	Role	Notes
1981	From a Far Country	Assistant	
1983	To the Lighthouse	Jasper (age 24)	TV film
1984	Memed, My Hawk	Memed	
1985	King David	Eliab	
1989	The Man in the Brown Suit	Harry Lucas	TV film
1989	The Saint: The Brazilian Connection	Simon Templar/The Saint	TV film
1989	The Saint: The Blue Dulac	Simon Templar/The Saint	TV film
1989	The Saint: Wrong Number	Simon Templar/The Saint	TV film
1989	The Saint: The Software Murders	Simon Templar/The Saint	TV film
1989	The Saint: The Big Bang	Simon Templar/The Saint	TV film
1989	The Saint: Fear in Fun Park	Simon Templar/The Saint	TV film
1990	Blood Royal: William the Conqueror	Robert Curthose	TV film
1994	Citizen Locke	Chief Justice	TV film
1997	The Place of the Dead	Lt Colonel Robert Neill	TV film
1998	Dangerous Beauty	Minister Ramberti	
2005	Lasko: Death Train	Matthias	TV film
2010	Come Rain Come Shine	Andy	TV film
2010	House Swap	Jack Wilson	
2011	1911	John Newell Jordan	
2013	Walking with the Enemy	Miklos Schoen	
2014	Suite Française	Maurice Michaud	
2014	A Royal Christmas	Victor	TV film
2015	Jupiter Ascending	Tskalikin	
2018	Royal Matchmaker	King Edward	TV film
2018	A Christmas Prince: The Royal Wedding	Lord Leopold	
TBA	The Experiment	Lincoln Jones	Post-production

=== Television ===
Year	Title	Role	Notes
1980	Fair Stood the Wind for France	Lancaster Crew	Mini-series
1981	Strangers	Luke	Episode: "Stand and Deliver"
1981	Winston Churchill: The Wilderness Years	William Deakin	Episode: "What Price Churchill?"
1982	Harry's Game	Lieutenant	Mini-series
1983	The Professionals	Tree	Episode: "No Stone"
1983	By the Sword Divided	Will Saltmarsh	Series regular
1984	Play for Today	Ben	Episode: "Only Children"
1984	Robin of Sherwood	Henry of Skipton	Episode: "The Prophecy
1987	A Sort of Innocence	Ben Crossley	1 episode
1989	Bergerac	DC Rushden	Episode: "Weekend Off"
1992	Downtown Lagos	Oliver	Mini-series
1993	Lovejoy	Iain	Episode: "Taking the Pledge"
1999	Nancherrow	Ronny Cox	Mini-series
2005	Heartbeat	Sir George Broughton	Episode: "Picture This"
2005	Holby City	Dominic Fryer	2 episodes
2006	Ancient Rome: The Rise and Fall of an Empire	Titus Labienus	Episode: "Caesar"
2007	The Afternoon Play	Ken Hunter	Episode: "The Real Deal"
2007	New Tricks	Duncan Freedman	Episode: "Casualty"
2007	Not Going Out	Guy	Series regular
2008	Bones	William Curry	Episode: "The Yanks in the U.K.: Parts 1 and 2 "
2009	Doctors	Robert Gaddis	Episode: "Arranged Family"
2010	Doctor Who	Alistair	Episode: "The Time of Angels"
2010	Holby City	Paul Sears	Episode: "All Cried Out"
2010	Garrow's Law	Earl of Sandwich	1 episode
2011	Midsomer Murders	Laurence Fletcher	Episode: "Dark Secrets"
2011	EastEnders	Philip Granger QC	1 episode
2011	Doctors	Harold Bempton	Episode: "Intereo Per Veneratio"
2013	Dracula	Sir Clive Dawson	Episode: "The Blood Is the Life"
2014	Doctors	Edwin Caroux	2 episodes
2016	Doctors	Adam Burt	Episode: "I Know She Lies"
2018	Endeavour	Armand De Vere	Episode: "Cartouche"
2022	The Walk-In	Mr. Jackson	1 episode
