= The Saint: The Software Murders =

- Based on: character created by Leslie Charteris
- Written by: Leslie Charteris
- Directed by: Henry Herbert
- Starring: Simon Dutton; David Ryall; Dinsdale Landen
- Country of origin: Australia
- Original language: English

Production
- Producer: Muir Sutherland
- Running time: 100 minutes
- Production company: Taffner Ramsay-Templar Productions

Original release
- Network: Seven Network
- Release: 1990

The Saint: The Software Murders is a 1990 TV film featuring Simon Dutton as Simon Templar, the crimefighter also known as The Saint. It was one of a series of Saint films produced in Australia and broadcast as part of the syndicated series Mystery Wheel of Adventure.

== Plot ==
When a number of scientists are murdered The Saint teams up with a Russian-American computer genius.

== Cast ==
- Simon Dutton as Simon Templar
- David Ryall as Teal
- Dinsdale Landen as Leard
- Shane Rimmer as Bob Harrison
- Malcolm Stoddard as River
- Pamela Sue Martin as Irina

== Production ==
This movie was one of six 100-minute TV films, all starring Simon Dutton made for London Weekend Television (LWT) in the United Kingdom, it was postponed due to poor ratings, but went out as part of The Mystery Wheel of Adventure in the United States:

  - The Saint: The Brazilian Connection (2 September 1989)
  - The Saint: The Blue Dulac (9 September 1989)
  - The Saint in Australia (14 July 1990)
  - The Saint: Wrong Number (21 July 1990)
  - The Saint: The Big Bang (28 July 1990)

=== Broadcast ===
The film was broadcast on 4 August 1990.
