= The Saint: Fear in Fun Park =

- Based on: character created by Leslie Charteris
- Written by: Patricia Johnson
- Directed by: Donald Crombie
- Starring: Simon Dutton; Rebecca Gilling; Ed Devereaux
- Country of origin: Australia
- Original language: English

Production
- Producers: Sue Milliken; John Hanrahan
- Cinematography: Andrew Lesnie
- Running time: 100 minutes
- Production company: Taffner Ramsay-Templar Productions

Original release
- Network: Seven Network
- Release: 1989

The Saint: Fear in Fun Park (also known as The Saint in Australia and Summertime in Sydney) is a 1989 TV film featuring Simon Dutton as Simon Templar, the crimefighter also known as The Saint.

It was one of a series of Saint films produced in Australia and broadcast as part of the syndicated series Mystery Wheel of Adventure. It was set in Australia.

== Plot ==
The Saint arrives in Sydney to look for a friend's daughter who is caught up in the Asian slave trade.

== Cast ==
- Simon Dutton as Simon Templar
- Rebecca Gilling as Aileen
- Ed Devereaux as Harry
- Nikki Coghill as Felicity
- Richard Roxburgh as Justin
- Moya O'Sullivan as Madge
- Anthony Brandon Wong as Randolph
- Khym Lam as Raeleen
- Slim de Grey as RSL Man
- Ernie Dingo as Tour Guide

== Production ==
This movie was one of six 100-minute TV films, all starring Simon Dutton made for London Weekend Television (LWT) in the United Kingdom, it was postponed due to poor ratings, but went out as part of The Mystery Wheel of Adventure in the United States:

  - The Saint: The Brazilian Connection (2 September 1989)
  - The Saint: The Blue Dulac (9 September 1989)
  - The Saint: Wrong Number (21 July 1990)
  - The Saint: The Big Bang (28 July 1990)
  - The Saint: The Software Murders (4 August 1990)

=== Broadcast ===
The film was postponed for broadcasting on 16 September 1989 and on 7 July 1990, and finally broadcast on 14 July 1990.
