= The Saint: The Big Bang =

- Based on: character created by Leslie Charteris
- Written by: Leslie Charteris
- Directed by: Paolo Barzman
- Starring: Simon Dutton; Morgan Brittany; Jerry Di Giacomo
- Country of origin: Australia
- Original language: English

Production
- Producer: Muir Sutherland
- Running time: 100 minutes
- Production company: Taffner Ramsay-Templar Productions

Original release
- Network: Seven Network
- Release: 1990

The Saint: The Big Bang is a 1990 TV film featuring Simon Dutton as Simon Templar, the crimefighter also known as The Saint. It was one of a series of Saint films produced in Australia and broadcast as part of the syndicated series Mystery Wheel of Adventure.

== Plot ==
The Saint teams up with a newspaper woman to explore the deaths surrounding a corporate takeover.

== Cast ==
- Simon Dutton as Simon Templar
- Morgan Brittany as Verity Chase
- Jerry Di Giacomo as Robert Demoyne
- Jean-Claude Dauphin as Rémy Blancpain

== Production ==
This movie was one of six 100-minute TV films, all starring Simon Dutton made for London Weekend Television (LWT) in the United Kingdom, it was postponed due to poor ratings, but went out as part of The Mystery Wheel of Adventure in the United States:

  - The Saint: The Brazilian Connection (2 September 1989)
  - The Saint: The Blue Dulac (9 September 1989)
  - The Saint: The Software Murders (4 August 1990)
  - The Saint in Australia (14 July 1990)
  - The Saint: Wrong Number (21 July 1990)

=== Broadcast ===
The film was broadcast on 28 July 1990.
