= The Saint: The Blue Dulac =

- Based on: character created by Leslie Charteris
- Written by: Peter Palliser
- Directed by: Dennis Berry
- Starring: Simon Dutton; John Astin
- Country of origin: Australia
- Original language: English

Production
- Producers: Claude Chauvat; Muir Sutherland
- Running time: 100 minutes
- Production company: Taffner Ramsay-Templar Productions

Original release
- Network: Seven Network
- Release: 1989

The Saint: The Blue Dulac is a 1989 TV film featuring Simon Dutton as Simon Templar, the crimefighter also known as The Saint. It was one of a series of Saint films produced in Australia and broadcast as part of the syndicated series Mystery Wheel of Adventure.

== Plot ==
The Saint must trap a ruthless American with the help of twin sisters and a rare Russian necklace.

== Cast ==
- Simon Dutton as Simon Templar
- John Astin as George Lafosse
- Sabine Naud as Sabine Gautier
- Camille Naud as Seraphine Gautier

== Production ==
This movie was one of six 100-minute TV films, all starring Simon Dutton made for London Weekend Television (LWT) in the United Kingdom, it was postponed due to poor ratings, but went out as part of The Mystery Wheel of Adventure in the United States:

  - The Saint: The Brazilian Connection (2 September 1989)
  - The Saint in Australia (14 July 1990)
  - The Saint: Wrong Number (21 July 1990)
  - The Saint: The Big Bang (28 July 1990)
  - The Saint: The Software Murders (4 August 1990)

=== Broadcast ===
The film was broadcast on 9 September 1989.
