= The Saint: The Brazilian Connection =

- Based on: character created by Leslie Charteris
- Written by: Anthony Horowitz
- Directed by: Ian Toynton
- Starring: Simon Dutton; Gayle Hunnicutt; David Ryall
- Country of origin: Australia
- Original language: English

Production
- Producer: Muir Sutherland
- Running time: 100 minutes
- Production company: Taffner Ramsay-Templar Productions

Original release
- Network: Seven Network
- Release: 1989

The Saint: The Brazilian Connection is a 1989 TV film featuring Simon Dutton as Simon Templar, the crimefighter also known as The Saint. It was one of a series of Saint films produced in Australia and broadcast as part of the syndicated series Mystery Wheel of Adventure.

== Plot ==
When a baby is kidnapped in London, The Saint follows a trail to a black-market baby ring based in Brazil.

== Cast ==
- Simon Dutton as Simon Templar
- Gayle Hunnicutt as Mrs. Cunningham
- David Ryall as Teal
- Simon Rouse as Fraser
- Jenifer Landor as Jenny

== Production ==
This movie was one of six 100-minute TV films starring Simon Dutton, made for London Weekend Television (LWT) in the United Kingdom. It was postponed due to poor ratings, but went out as part of The Mystery Wheel of Adventure in the United States:

  - The Saint: The Blue Dulac (9 September 1989)
  - The Saint: Fear in Fun Park (14 July 1990)
  - The Saint: Wrong Number (21 July 1990)
  - The Saint: The Big Bang (28 July 1990)
  - The Saint: The Software Murders (4 August 1990)

=== Broadcast ===
The film was broadcast on 2 September 1989.
