= The Saint: Wrong Number =

- Based on: character created by Leslie Charteris
- Written by: Leslie Charteris
- Directed by: Marijan David Vajda
- Starring: Simon Dutton; Günther Maria Halmer; Arielle Dombasle
- Country of origin: Australia
- Original language: English

Production
- Producer: Muir Sutherland
- Running time: 100 minutes
- Production company: Taffner Ramsay-Templar Productions

Original release
- Network: Seven Network
- Release: 1990

The Saint: Wrong Number is a 1990 TV film featuring Simon Dutton as Simon Templar, the crimefighter also known as The Saint. It was one of a series of Saint films produced in Australia and broadcast as part of the syndicated series Mystery Wheel of Adventure.

== Plot ==
Simon Templar spends a weekend in Berlin with a girlfriend, and he ends up with a chance to prevent missiles getting into the hands of terrorists.

== Cast ==
- Simon Dutton as Simon Templar
- Günther Maria Halmer as Otto Schmidt (as Günther-Maria Halmer)
- Arielle Dombasle as Stella Moreau
- Vince Edwards as General Daniel T. Donovan

== Production ==
This movie was one of six 100-minute TV films, all starring Simon Dutton made for London Weekend Television (LWT) in the United Kingdom, it was postponed due to poor ratings, but went out as part of The Mystery Wheel of Adventure in the United States:

  - The Saint: The Brazilian Connection (2 September 1989)
  - The Saint: The Blue Dulac (9 September 1989)
  - The Saint: The Software Murders (4 August 1990)
  - The Saint in Australia (14 July 1990)
  - The Saint: The Big Bang (28 July 1990)

=== Broadcast ===
The film was postponed for broadcasting on 14 July 1990 and on 7 July 1990, and finally broadcast on 21 July 1990.
