= The Saint (1997 film) =

1997 American thriller film

- Theatrical release poster
- Directed by: Phillip Noyce
- Screenplay by: Jonathan Hensleigh; Wesley Strick
- Story by: Jonathan Hensleigh
- Based on: Simon Templar by Leslie Charteris
- Produced by: David Brown; Robert Evans; William J. Macdonald; Mace Neufeld
- Starring: Val Kilmer; Elisabeth Shue; Rade Šerbedžija
- Cinematography: Phil Méheux
- Edited by: Terry Rawlings
- Music by: Graeme Revell
- Production companies: Rysher Entertainment; Mace Neufeld Productions
- Distributed by: Paramount Pictures
- Release date: April 4, 1997
- Running time: 116 minutes
- Country: United States
- Languages: English; Russian
- Budget: $90 million
- Box office: $169.4 million

The Saint is a 1997 American action thriller film directed by Phillip Noyce, written by Jonathan Hensleigh and Wesley Strick, and starring Val Kilmer in the title role, with Elisabeth Shue and Rade Šerbedžija. The plot of the film revolves around the title character who is a high-tech thief and master of disguise, who becomes the anti-hero while using the moniker of various saints. He paradoxically lives in the underworld of international industrial theft and espionage. The film was a modest financial success with a worldwide box office of $169.4 million, rentals of $28.2 million, and continuous DVD sales.

It is loosely based on the character of Simon Templar created by Leslie Charteris in 1928 for a series of books published as "The Saint", which ran until 1983. The Saint character has also featured in a series of Hollywood films made between 1938 and 1954, a 1940s radio series starring Vincent Price (and others) as Templar, a popular British television series of the 1960s starring Roger Moore, and a 1970s series starring Ian Ogilvy.

== Plot ==
At the Saint Ignatius Orphanage, a rebellious boy named John Rossi refers to himself as "Simon Templar" and leads fellow orphans in an attempt to run away. He tries to bid farewell to a girl named Agnes with a kiss, but they are caught and she accidentally falls from a balcony to her death.

As an adult, Simon—now a professional thief dubbed "The Saint" for using Catholic saints as aliases—steals a microchip from a Russian oil company. Simon stages the burglary during a political rally for the company's owner Ivan Tretiak, a billionaire oligarch and former Communist Party boss rallying support against Russian president Karpov. Simon is caught by Tretiak's son Ilya but escapes with the microchip, and is hired by Tretiak to steal a revolutionary cold fusion formula discovered by Emma Russell, an American electrochemist working at Oxford; Tretiak plans to use Emma's formula for clean, inexpensive energy to monopolize the energy market during a severe oil shortage in Russia, but Tretiak secretly plans to murder Simon for stealing his microchip.

Using the alias "Thomas More", Simon poses as a Boer traveller to seduce Emma, and steals the formula, but when Simon develops romantic feelings for her, he decides to give up on stealing the formula, and when Tretiak threatens to kidnap her, Simon finally steals the formula after a one-night stand. Tretiak realizes the formula is incomplete and sends Ilya and his henchmen to kill Simon, who narrowly escapes. Simon returns to Russia to demand his payment from Tretiak while disguised as Tretiak himself. With all the money obtained from Tretiak, Simon achieves his goal of obtaining $50,550,000 and retires from the robbery trade. A heartbroken Emma reports the theft of her formula to Inspectors Teal and Rabineau of Scotland Yard, who inform her Simon is a wanted international thief.

Emma tracks down Simon to a Moscow hotel where Tretiak has them arrested, but they escape and flee through the suburbs. They are sheltered by a prostitute and her family and meet Frankie, a spiv who sells them directions through the sewers to the U.S. embassy. Finding Ilya and his men waiting for them, Simon lets himself be caught to allow Emma to safely reach the embassy, then escapes after igniting a car's gas tank and leaving Ilya severely burned.

Planting a listening device in Tretiak's office, Simon learns he plans to sell the incomplete formula to Karpov and frame him for wasting billions on useless technology, then use the political fallout to install himself as president. Emma finishes the formula, which Simon delivers to Tretiak's well-meaning physicist Dr. Lev Botvin, who builds an apparatus that proves the formula works. Simon infiltrates the Kremlin and informs Karpov of Tretiak's conspiracy, but they are captured by Tretiak loyalists. At a massive gathering in Red Square, Tretiak makes his accusations against Karpov, but Botvin's cold fusion reactor is successfully initiated, exposing Tretiak as a fraud. He and Ilya are arrested, and revealed to have caused the heating-oil shortage by stockpiling vast amounts of oil underneath their mansion.

Reuniting with Emma, Simon returns her formula and they start a secret relationship. She presents her formula to the world at a news conference, which Simon attends in disguise and escapes Teal and Rabineau when they spot him in the crowd. Driving away, he hears a news broadcast that $3 billion was donated to the Red Cross, Salvation Army, and the United Nations Children's Fund; it is implied that Simon, who had access to Tretiak's accounts, gave the money anonymously and established a non-profit foundation led by Dr. Botvin to develop the cold-fusion technology.

== Cast ==
- Val Kilmer as Simon Templar
  - Adam Smith as Young Simon Templar
- Elisabeth Shue as Dr. Emma Russell
- Rade Serbedzija as Ivan Petrovich Tretiak
- Valery Nikolaev as Ilya Ivanovich Tretiak
- Henry Goodman as Dr. Lev Naumovich Botvin
- Alun Armstrong as Inspector Teal
- Michael Byrne as Yuri Vereshagin
- Yevgeni Lazarev as President Karpov
- Irina Apeksimova as Aleksa "Frankie" Frankeyevich
- Lev Prygunov as General Leo Sklarov
- Charlotte Cornwell as Inspector Rabineau
- Tommy Flanagan as Scarface
- Egor Pazenko as Scratchface
- Verity-Jane Dearsley as Agnes
- Roger Moore as Radio Announcer Voice
- David Schneider as Bar Waiter
- William Hope as State Department Official
- Emily Mortimer as Woman on the plane

== Production ==
Film adaptations of Leslie Charteris's anti-hero Simon Templar (The Saint) date back to the late 1930s when RKO Radio Pictures launched a popular series of B movies with a succession of different actors playing the lead role. After that, save for two unsuccessful French attempts at launching new film series, the character was confined to television: The Saint, a 1960s series starring Roger Moore; Return of the Saint, a 1970s updating starring Ian Ogilvy; a failed 1987 pilot for American TV, The Saint in Manhattan starring Andrew Clarke; and a set of feature-length made-for-television adventures co-produced in the United Kingdom, Canada, France, West Germany, and Australia in 1989 starring Simon Dutton. Of these, the Moore series remained the definitive television adaptation.

In the mid-1980s, tabloid gossip newspapers such as the National Enquirer reported that Moore was planning to produce a new Saint movie, with Pierce Brosnan (then known for playing the Templar-influenced character Remington Steele on TV and later of James Bond fame) being considered for the role, though nothing came of this project.

The reference work The Saint: A Complete History by Burl Barer (McFarland 1992) was written at a time when another set of plans were under way to launch a new Saint film series, which would have been faithful to the original writings of Leslie Charteris and feature characters from the original books. This project also failed.

A few years later, Paramount Pictures' attempt to make a film of The Saint started with the powerhouse above-the-line team of Robert Evans as producer, Steven Zaillian as writer and Sydney Pollack as director. Ralph Fiennes—hot from Schindler's List and Quiz Show—was offered $1 million for the lead, but eventually passed. In a 1994 interview for Première magazine, Fiennes said the screenplay—racing fast cars and breaking into Swiss banks—was nothing he had not seen before.

Robert Evans left the project—although, contractually, his name remains on the final film's credits—and David Brown (Jaws, Driving Miss Daisy) took over. A new story was commissioned from Jonathan Hensleigh (Die Hard with a Vengeance), which cast Simon Templar as a mercenary hired by a billionaire Russian oil and gas tycoon to steal the secret of cold fusion from an eccentric but beautiful American scientist. The story would take place in Washington, D.C., Upstate New York, St. Petersburg, and Moscow. Set pieces included Dr. Russell skydiving while strapped into a wheelchair and a plane landing in Red Square. Darwin Mayflower described it as one of the top unproduced screenplays. Phillip Noyce was hired to direct.

Providing a link to both the 1960s The Saint TV series and the later Return of the Saint revival of the 1970s, Robert S. Baker, the producer of both series, was brought in an executive producer of the film.

In a 1997 interview with Des O'Connor for his ITV show, Hugh Grant says he passed on the role after a meeting with Noyce because he did not like the director's approach to the character. Along with Grant, Kenneth Branagh, Mel Gibson, Arnold Schwarzenegger, Christian Slater, George Clooney, Kevin Costner, Johnny Depp, and Daniel Day-Lewis all refused the role. Val Kilmer was cast after declining to reprise the role of Batman/Bruce Wayne in Joel Schumacher's Batman & Robin and the script was rewritten by Wesley Strick to suit his style.

Strick's rewrite relocated the action to London and Oxford and merged two villains together by having Tretiak running for president himself rather than endorsing a puppet candidate. Kilmer was constantly pressing for more disguises in the film, although Paramount wanted to keep that idea for their Mission: Impossible franchise. The Saint, as devised by Charteris in the 1930s, used crude disguises instead of the sophisticated ones shown in this film.

Unusual for an action star of the time (as in heroes played by Steven Seagal, Bruce Willis or Mel Gibson), this Saint refrained from killing and even the main villains live to stand trial. Charteris's version had no qualms about taking another life.

In the original version of the film—as in the original Jonathan Hensleigh script—Emma, having escaped Russia via the American embassy, collapses while giving a lecture and dies in Simon Templar's arms. Watching the videotape back, he sees Ilya Tretiak stabbing her in the leg with the tip of his cane. The final half-hour has Simon returning to Moscow to destroy the villains' plans and avenge her death. With Dr. Botvin's help, he switches the formulas around and humiliates Ivan Tretiak during his show trial of the Russian president. The Tretiaks shoot their way out of the crowd and escape back to their mansion, with Simon and the Russian Army in pursuit. Ivan shoots the treacherous Dr. Botvin, and in turn Ilya shoots and kills Ivan. Simon arrives and finds the bodies of Botvin and Ivan Tretiak. Simon battles Ilya on the stairwell as Russian tanks pound the mansion walls, exposing and setting fire to the vast stockpile of heating oil in the basement. With the stairwell disintegrating around them, the fight spills out on to the chandelier, suspended above the blazing oil. Simon teases Ilya with the disc containing the formula for cold fusion. As he reaches out for it, Simon cuts the rope and Ilya plummets to a fiery death. Returning to Emma's home, Simon finds a letter from her, a tear fills his eye and he vows to use his skills only for good.

The novelization features an alternate version in which Emma lives and Simon and Ilya still battle on the chandelier. In the end the producers decided to cut Emma's death scene and Templar's battle with Ilya, inserted footage of the Tretiaks being arrested and filmed a new epilogue at Oxford. (Footage from the original ending features prominently in the film's trailer.)

The film featured the Volvo C70, a nod to the Volvo P1800 of the original series.

Fort Amherst starred as a filming location for The Saint in 1997. The tunnels were used for the scene in which Simon receives a map in the Kremlin tunnel in Moscow.

== Novelization ==
A novelization based upon the film script was written by Burl Barer.

== Soundtrack ==
The film's soundtrack album, The Saint: Music from the Motion Picture Soundtrack included many songs from the electronica age.

The songs "Out of My Mind" by Duran Duran and "6 Underground" by the Sneaker Pimps were played during the credits, and released as singles to promote the movie. Additional artists included Orbital, Moby, Fluke, Luscious Jackson, The Chemical Brothers, Underworld, Daft Punk, David Bowie, Dreadzone, Duncan Sheik, Everything but the Girl and the theme "Polaroid Millenium" [sic] by "Superior" (alias of British musicians Su Goodacre and Lee Knott) which also played during the final credits.

The Saint won the 1998 BMI Film Music Award.

== Reception ==
=== Box office ===
The Saint was the #2 film for its opening weekend, ranking below Liar Liar and earning $16,278,873 at 2,307 theaters in the United States. With a domestic gross of $61,363,304, it ranked 28th of 303 movies for 1997 Internationally the film earned $108 million, with a worldwide total of $169.4 million.

=== Critical response ===
On Rotten Tomatoes, the film has an approval rating of 31% based on 48 reviews. The websites consensus states: "The Saint is watchable thanks to Val Kilmer and Elisabeth Shue, but the film's muddled screenplay stretches credulity". On Metacritic, the film has a score of 50 out of 100 based on 22 reviews, indicating "Mixed or average reviews". Audiences surveyed by CinemaScore gave the film a grade B+ on scale of A to F.

Edward Guthmann of the San Francisco Chronicle notes Kilmer is the "master of disguises", as "Templar's genius, like Kilmer's, involves slipping in and out of skins rapidly and offering only the slightest hint at the person who hides beneath the charade... Kilmer dons 12 disguises in all, polishes them with impeccable accents and pliable postures", with Shue's character offering "the same sympathetic dignity she brought to Leaving Las Vegas". Liam Lacey of The Toronto Globe and Mail said The Saint is "More entertaining than Mission: Impossible or the last Bond film GoldenEye. It brings back the humour and sangfroid that makes the genre work". Todd McCarthy of Variety called it a "suspenser that doesn't taste bad at first bite but becomes increasingly hard to swallow".

It received two thumbs down on a 1997 episode of Siskel & Ebert. Gene Siskel criticized the romantic plot between Shue and Kilmer's characters, and described Shue's character as "lousy". He also disliked the disguises, saying "I think the disguises are a big mistake. I think it becomes the 'Nutty Saint' if you will. I think it really works cross-purposes to establishing any kind of tension in the picture."

== Reboot ==
On June 17, 2016, it was announced that Paramount Pictures was planning a reboot of the film, with Lorenzo di Bonaventura and Robert Evans serving as producers. Dexter Fletcher was announced as the film's director in February 2020, after previously working with the studio on Rocketman, with Seth Grahame-Smith writing the screenplay. In July 2021, Regé-Jean Page was cast in the film and would also serve as executive producer, with Kwame Kwei-Armah now writing the screenplay. In November 2023 it was reported that Doug Liman was now directing the film from a script by Rory Haines and Sohrab Noshirvani.
