= List of works by Leslie Charteris =

Leslie Charteris bibliography
- Novels↙: 19
- Collections↙: 14
- Scripts↙: 8
- Translations↙: 1
- Novellas↙: 11
- Non-fiction↙: 2
- Introduction↙: 1

Leslie Charteris (born Leslie Charles Bowyer Yin; 1907–1993) was a British-American writer best known for his series on stories featuring Simon Templar, also known as The Saint. Born in Singapore to a Chinese father, Suat Yin Chwan, and his English wife, Lydia (née Bowyer), Charteris travelled extensively with his family until beginning his education in England in 1919. In 1925 he enrolled at King's College, Cambridge, but left after a year in order to become a writer; to support himself, he worked as a goldminer, bartender, professional bridge player and temporary policeman. In October 1926 he changed his name by deed poll to Leslie Charles Bowyer Charteris-Ian, and professionally used the shorter version, Leslie Charteris.

Charteris's first five novels were published by Ward Lock & Co; he also had a story The Red River published in their Windsor Magazine in May 1927. The first novel, X Esquire, which he later described as "an appallingly bad book", was published in 1927; his second novel—The White Rider, published in 1928—is "overwritten and poorly constructed", according to his biographer Joan DelFattore. In his third novel, Meet the Tiger (1928), he introduced the character of Simon Templar, a debonair gentleman crook who goes by the nom de guerre, The Saint.

Charteris continued writing Saint books and the series gained in popularity because of its "mix of light humour, sophisticated settings, and story-line emphasising the role of a crusader tackling the forces of evil", which had "special appeal in the depression". Charteris moved to the United States in 1932 and soon began writing screenplays, the first of which resulted in Midnight Club, released in 1933.

In the June 1954 issue of The Magazine of Fantasy and Science Fiction, Charteris published Fish Story. According to the editors, it was written during (or inspired by) a leisure trip to Florida.

From the late 1960s to 1983, Charteris served in an editorial capacity for a continuation series of Saint books consisting of a mixture of novella- and novel-length adaptations of episodes of The Saint and Return of the Saint TV series, comic strip stories, as well as a few original stories. On some editions, Charteris is the cover author, with the actual writers credited within. Listed below are Saint books from this period for which Charteris is believed to have had a more active role than editor.

Charteris also worked on three books of non-fiction and an introduction to the 1980 re-issue of The Saint Meets the Tiger. The works consisted of a translation from Spanish to English of the autobiography of the bullfighter Juan Belmonte, a language guide to Spanish, and a guide to Paleneo, a wordless, pictorial sign language invented by Charteris. He died in Windsor, Berkshire, in April 1993.

== Novels and story collections ==
"You might have seen something of the Indian, too, in the intent lines of his tanned reckless face; but that would have been an easy illusion. The same lines would have fitted as naturally into the picture of a conquistador ... or of d'Artagnan mocking the courts of France: they were only the heraldry of a character that would have been the same in any age or place, the timeless brand of the born buccaneer."

— Charteris's description of Simon Templar in The Saint Goes West.

The books of Leslie Charteris
Title	Year of first publication	First edition publisher	Simon Templar book?	Format	Ref.
X Esquire	1927	Ward Lock & Co, London	✗	Novel	
The White Rider	1928	Ward Lock & Co, London	✗	Novel	
Meet the Tiger	1928	Ward Lock & Co, London	✓	Novel	
The Bandit	1929	Ward Lock & Co, London	✗	Novel	
Daredevil	1929	Ward Lock & Co, London	✗	Novel	
Enter the Saint	1930	Hodder & Stoughton, London	✓	Novellas	
The Last Hero	1930	Hodder & Stoughton, London	✓	Novel	
Knight Templar	1930	Hodder & Stoughton, London	✓	Novel	
Featuring the Saint	1931	Hodder & Stoughton, London	✓	Novellas	
Alias the Saint	1931	Hodder & Stoughton, London	✓	Novellas	
She Was a Lady	1931	Hodder & Stoughton, London	✓	Novel	
The Holy Terror	1932	Hodder & Stoughton, London	✓	Novellas	
Getaway	1932	Hodder & Stoughton, London	✓	Novel	
Once More the Saint	1933	Hodder & Stoughton, London	✓	Novellas	
The Brighter Buccaneer	1933	Hodder & Stoughton, London	✓	Short story collection	
The Misfortunes of Mr. Teal	1934	Hodder & Stoughton, London	✓	Novellas	
Boodle	1934	Hodder & Stoughton, London	✓	Short story collection	
The Saint Goes On	1934	Hodder & Stoughton, London	✓	Novellas	
The Saint in New York	1935	Hodder & Stoughton, London	✓	Novel	
Saint Overboard	1936	Hodder & Stoughton, London	✓	Novel	
The Ace of Knaves	1937	Hodder & Stoughton, London	✓	Novellas	
Thieves' Picnic	1937	Hodder & Stoughton, London	✓	Novel	
Prelude for War	1938	Hodder & Stoughton, London	✓	Novel	
Follow the Saint	1938	Doubleday, Garden City, NY	✓	Novellas	
The Happy Highwayman	1939	Hodder & Stoughton, London	✓	Short story collection	
The Saint in Miami	1940	Doubleday, Garden City, NY	✓	Novel	
The Saint Goes West	1942	Hodder & Stoughton, London	✓	Novellas	
The Saint Steps In	1942	Doubleday, Garden City, NY	✓	Novel	
The Saint on Guard	1944	Doubleday, Garden City, NY	✓	Novellas	
Lady on a Train	1945	Shaw Press, Los Angeles, CA	✗	Novelisation (Note: Novelisation of the film of the same name, for which Charteris also wrote the script.)	
The Saint Sees it Through	1946	Doubleday, Garden City, NY	✓	Novel	
Call for the Saint	1948	Hodder & Stoughton, London	✓	Novellas	
Saint Errant	1948	Doubleday, Garden City, NY	✓	Short story collection	
The Saint in Europe	1953	Doubleday, Garden City, NY	✓	Short story collection	
The Saint on the Spanish Main	1955	Doubleday, Garden City, NY	✓	Short story collection	
The Saint Around the World	1956	Doubleday, Garden City, NY	✓	Short story collection	
Thanks to the Saint	1957	Doubleday, Garden City, NY	✓	Short story collection	
Señor Saint	1958	Doubleday, Garden City, NY	✓	Short story collection	
The Saint to the Rescue	1959	Doubleday, Garden City, NY	✓	Short story collection	
Trust the Saint	1962	Doubleday, Garden City, NY	✓	Short story collection	
The Saint in the Sun	1963	Doubleday, Garden City, NY	✓	Short story collection	
Vendetta for the Saint (Note: by Harry Harrison, Leslie Charteris.)	1964	Doubleday, Garden City, NY	✓	Novel	
The Saint in Pursuit (Note: by Fleming Lee, Leslie Charteris; novelisation of a comic strip.)	1970	Doubleday, Garden City, NY	✓	Novel	
The Saint and the People Importers (Note: by Fleming Lee, Leslie Charteris; novelisation of a television script.)	1970	Doubleday, Garden City, NY	✓	Novel	

== Screenplays ==
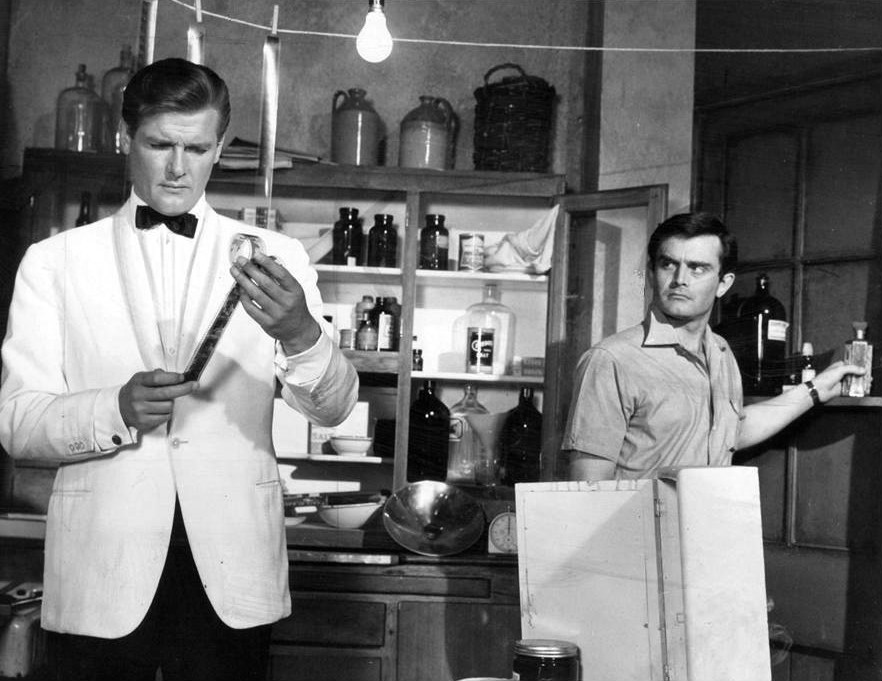
Roger Moore (left) played the television incarnation in The Saint.

The screenplays of Leslie Charteris
Title	Year	Co-writer(s)	Studio	Ref.
Midnight Club	1933	Seton I. Miller	Paramount Pictures	
The Saint's Double Trouble	1940	Ben Holmes	RKO Radio Pictures	
The Saint's Vacation	1941	Jeffrey Dell	RKO Radio Pictures	
The Saint in Palm Springs	1941	Jerome Cady	RKO Radio Pictures	
Lady on a Train	1945	–	Universal	
River Gang	1945	–	Universal	
Two Smart People	1946	Ethel Hill	Metro-Goldwyn-Mayer	
Tarzan and the Huntress	1947	Jerry Gruskin, Rowland Leigh	RKO Radio Pictures	

== Non-fiction ==
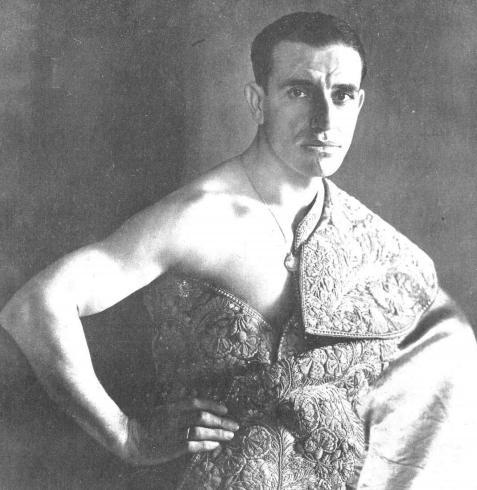
Juan Belmonte, whose autobiography Charteris translated into English in 1937

Other works of Charteris
Title	Year of first publication	First edition publisher	Category	Notes	Ref.
Juan Belmonte, Killer of Bulls: The Autobiography of a Matador	1937	Heinemann, London	Autobiography	Charteris undertook the translation from Spanish to English	
Spanish for Fun	1964	Hodder & Stoughton, London	Language guide	–	
Paleneo: A Universal Sign Language	1972	Hodder & Stoughton, London	Sign language guide	Paleneo, a wordless, pictorial sign language, was invented by Charteris	
The Saint Meets the Tiger	1980	Charter Communications, Indianapolis, IN	Saint novel	Introduction only	

== Notes and references ==
Notes

== Sources ==
- Barer, Burl (2003). The Saint: A Complete History in Print, Radio, Film and Television of Leslie Charteris' Robin Hood of Modern Crime, Simon Templar, 1928–1992. Jefferson, NC: McFarland & Company. ISBN 978-0-7864-1680-6.
- Charteris, Leslie (2013) [1928]. The Saint Goes West. London: Mulholland Books. ISBN 978-1-4447-6630-1.
- DelFattore, Joan (1989). "Leslie Charteris". In Benstock, Bernard; Staley, Thomas (eds.). British Mystery Writers, 1920–39. Detroit: Gale Research. ISBN 978-0-8103-4555-3.
- Lofts, W.O.G.; Adley, Derek (April 1985). "The 'Saint' Stories of Leslie Charteris". The Book and Magazine Collector (14). Diamond Publishing Group.
- Lycett, Andrew (2004). "Ian, Leslie Charles Bowyer Charteris [formerly Leslie Charles Bowyer Yin; pseud. Leslie Charteris]". Oxford Dictionary of National Biography (online ed.). Oxford University Press. doi:10.1093/ref:odnb/51562. (Subscription, Wikipedia Library access or UK public library membership required.)
- Wright, Norman (June 1997). "Leslie Charteris's 'The Saint'". The Book and Magazine Collector (159). Diamond Publishing Group. UPC 977-0-95286-006-9.
