= The Saint in the Sun =

1963 collection of short stories by Leslie Charteris

- First UK edition
- Author: Leslie Charteris
- Language: English
- Series: The Saint
- Genre: Mystery fiction
- Publisher: The Crime Club
- Publication date: 1963
- Publication place: United Kingdom
- Media type: Print (hardback & paperback)
- Preceded by: Trust the Saint
- Followed by: Vendetta for the Saint

The Saint in the Sun is a collection of short stories by Leslie Charteris, featuring the Robin Hood-inspired crimefighter, Simon Templar, whom Charteris introduced in 1928. The book was first published in 1963 by The Crime Club in the United States and by Hodder and Stoughton in the United Kingdom in 1964. This was the 36th book of Simon Templar adventures, and was the first published after the start of the TV series The Saint starring Roger Moore as Templar.

This was the final Simon Templar book to be solely written by Charteris. Following this release, Charteris began to step back from writing the series and future volumes would be written by different authors but credited to Charteris (who continued on in an editorial capacity until the book series was retired in 1983).

This volume marks a one-time return to the travelogue theme that had dominated the Saint books of the early-mid-1950s particularly The Saint in Europe, The Saint on the Spanish Main, and The Saint Around the World as each story takes place in a different exotic locale. This was the last Saint book to feature short stories; hereafter the books would be either longer novellas or full novels.

The book is dedicated to film director John Paddy Carstairs who not only directed entries in the RKO Pictures Saint film series, but also episodes of the Roger Moore series.

== Stories ==
The book consisted of 7 stories:

1. Cannes: The Better Mousetrap
2. St. Tropez: The Ugly Impresario
3. England: The Prodigal Miser
4. Nassau: The Fast Women
5. Florida: The Jolly Undertaker
6. Lucerne: The Russian Prisoner
7. Provence: The Hopeless Heiress

== Television adaptations ==
Three stories from this collection were later adapted as episodes of the 1962-69 TV series, The Saint.

All three stories appeared during the fifth season, with "The Russian Prisoner" airing on 14 October 1966, followed by "The Better Mousetrap" on 25 November and "The Fast Women" on 13 January 1967. "The Fast Women" was the last original Leslie Charteris story to be adapted for the series.
