= Prelude for War =

1938 novel by Leslie Charteris

Prelude for War also The Saint and the Sinners also The Saint Plays with Fire
- First edition (UK)
- Author: Leslie Charteris
- Language: English
- Series: The Saint
- Genre: Mystery, Novel
- Publisher: Hodder and Stoughton (UK); The Crime Club (US)
- Publication date: 1938
- Publication place: United Kingdom
- Media type: Print (Hardback & Paperback)
- Preceded by: Thieves' Picnic
- Followed by: Follow the Saint

Prelude for War is a mystery novel by Leslie Charteris featuring his Robin Hood-inspired crime fighter, Simon Templar, alias "The Saint". The book was first published in the United Kingdom in 1938 by Hodder and Stoughton, and in the United States by The Crime Club the same year. Previously, the novel had been serialized in the American magazine Cosmopolitan. Publication of the book marked the 10th anniversary of the Simon Templar character.

Later editions of the book were retitled The Saint and the Sinners and The Saint Plays with Fire. This was the last time a Simon Templar novel or short story collection would be published under different titles (although a later novella, The Saint and the Sizzling Saboteur from The Saint on Guard, would later be published individually).

== Plot ==
A peaceful moonlight drive in the English countryside is interrupted when Simon Templar and Patricia Holm listen to a disturbing radio broadcast from France by a would-be dictator who plans to make it the latest in a growing number of European dictatorships under a ruling party, the Sons of France. This broadcast disturbs Patricia, and Templar makes a dire (and, as it will turn out, accurate) prediction that the future of Europe will be one of invasions and concentration camps.

The two adventurers are interrupted in their worries when they spot a house on fire in the distance. Rushing to help, Templar enters the burning building but is unable to rescue a man trapped inside. Later, he and Patricia learn that one of the occupants of the house is a known war profiteer, who is expected to make millions off both sides if a new European war erupts.

Templar, examining the facts of the fire and the man's death, comes to the conclusion that he was murdered. When he is later called to testify at a coroner's inquest into the death, Templar is disturbed to see an obvious whitewash underway that attempts to label the death as accidental. Templar launches his own investigation into the death, which gets off to a bad start when one of his targets is murdered, and Scotland Yard Chief Inspector Claud Eustace Teal catches Templar leaning over the dead body.

Now firmly intrigued, Templar continues his investigations, which lead him on the trail of an assassination plot designed to spark a Second World War, a clue to which is provided from beyond the grave.

The book's cover indicates this plot element, portraying the Saint as trying to close a door through which armed soldiers are trying to enter.

Prelude for War, in retrospect, can be seen as a prelude for Templar's later work on behalf of the war effort, as chronicled in The Saint in Miami and succeeding books written and set during World War II.

== Television adaptation ==
Prelude for War was adapted as an episode of The Saint entitled "The Saint Plays with Fire". The episode aired on November 28, 1963, during the second season. It is one of only a few full Saint novels to be adapted for the series.
