= The Saint (2017 film) =

2017 film by Simon West

- Official release poster
- Based on: Characters by Leslie Charteris
- Written by: Jesse Alexander; Tony Giglio
- Directed by: Ernie Barbarash
- Starring: Adam Rayner; Enrique Murciano; Eliza Dushku; Ian Ogilvy; Roger Moore
- Music by: Neal Acree
- Country of origin: United States
- Original language: English

Production
- Producers: Kyle A. Clark; Amy Krell; Lina Wong
- Cinematography: Paul M. Sommers
- Editors: Michael Purl; Heath Ryan; Henk Van Eeghen
- Running time: 91 minutes
- Production companies: Motion Picture Corporation of America; Silver Screen Pictures

Original release
- Release: July 11, 2017

The Saint is a 2017 American action film directed by Ernie Barbarash and starring Adam Rayner in the title role of Simon Templar, created by Leslie Charteris. This was Roger Moore's final film appearance and the film was dedicated to his memory as he died two months before the release; Moore portrayed Templar in a 1960s TV series of the same title. Filmed in 2013 as a television pilot for a proposed TV series, the film was not originally intended for release when the series was not picked up. It eventually saw release direct-to-video in 2017 when it was released in tribute to Moore following his death. Ian Ogilvy, who portrayed Templar in a 1970s TV series Return of the Saint, also appears.

== Plot ==
Simon Templar, also known as "The Saint," foils a terrorist plot to trade gold for bombs. After seizing most of the gold, he leaves his signature calling card. Meanwhile, a mysterious figure instructs a banker, Arnie Valecross, to steal $2.5 billion in aid meant for Nigeria. Templar, aware of the theft, decides to recover the funds.

Valecross diverts the money, prompting his employer to kidnap his daughter. Templar intervenes, but Valecross is fatally wounded, revealing crucial information before dying. With Valecross out of the picture, Templar, along with his friend Patricia Holm and associate Doyle Cosentino, seeks the elusive "nomad" mentioned by Valecross.

As the FBI, led by Agent John Henry Fernack, pursues Templar, they all race against time to locate the nomad and retrieve the stolen funds. Along the way, they uncover connections between Templar's past and the mysterious employer orchestrating the chaos.

In the end, Templar successfully rescues the hostages, returns the money, and confronts the man responsible for his parents' death, ultimately opting for justice over revenge.

== Cast ==
- Adam Rayner as Simon Templar
- Eliza Dushku as Patricia Holm
- Roger Moore as Jasper
- James Remar as Arnold Valecross
- Ian Ogilvy as The Fixer/older Xander
- Adam Woodward as Xander
- Enrique Murciano as Inspector John Henry Fernack
- Kyle Horne as Agent Cooper
- Sammi Hanratty as Zooey Valecross
- Greg Grunberg as Detective Garces
- Thomas Kretschmann as Rayt Marius
- Yani Gellman as Doyle Cosentino
- Kristy Mitchell as Mrs. Templar
- Beatrice Rosen as Katherine Valecross
- Melissa Bolona as Hotel Guest
- Jason Brooks as Captain Miller
- Christopher Villiers as Arthur Templar
- Louis Hynes as Young Simon Templar
- Femi Elufowoju Jr. as Ezekiel Ibaka
- Alec Secareanu as Bashir
- Richard Ashton as Vadim / Gerry
- Andrew Pleavin as Andrei
- Sonalii Castillo as Sonali Alves

== Production ==
A new television adaptation of The Saint was announced in December 2012; Roger Moore was appointed to produce a new series to star Adam Rayner as Simon Templar and Eliza Dushku as his assistant Patricia Holm. In a later promotion, it was also shown that Moore would star in the new series, as would his successor in Return of the Saint, Ian Ogilvy. Production of a pilot episode was completed by early 2013. As of summer 2014, it was awaiting a broadcast time in the U.S. However, the piece underwent reshoots for the ending and add an extra prologue in November 2015, and the pilot episode was retooled as a TV film, The Saint, getting an online release on 12 July 2017, two months after Moore's death.

The pilot was based upon the character created by Leslie Charteris in 1928, and although the plot of the film has no relation to any of Charteris' stories, the villain, Rayt Marius, was a recurring presence in the early Saint novels, and was the central villain of the 1930 novel The Last Hero.

Although the character of Patricia Holm was a regular presence in the Saint novels from the 1920s through the early 1940s, this was only the second production (after the 1943 film The Saint Meets the Tiger) in which she has appeared.

Inspector John Henry Fernack was also a prominent recurring character in the books.

While the pilot was directed by Simon West, the new material to extend it was directed by Ernie Barbarash. He had limited windows of availability for Rayner, who was busy on his series Tyrant, and Dushku; in the new material Rayner sports a beard, as in Tyrant, and Templar's new scenes with Holm take place over Skype calls so the actors did not need to be available on the same day. Inspector Fernack does not appear in the new scenes with the bearded Templar; an equivalent role is filled by Kyle Horne as FBI agent Cooper. Ian Ogilvy's role was greatly expanded, with new flashbacks to establish his backstory, and Roger Moore recorded new dialogue to replace lines which no longer fit the reworked plot.
