= The Saint in Trouble =

- US hardcover edition
- Author: Graham Weaver, based upon a teleplay by Terence Feely, a story by John Kruse, and characters by Leslie Charteris
- Language: English
- Series: The Saint
- Genre: Mystery, Novellas
- Publisher: The Crime Club
- Publication date: 1978
- Publication place: United Kingdom
- Media type: Print (Hardback & Paperback)
- Preceded by: Send for the Saint
- Followed by: The Saint and the Templar Treasure

The Saint in Trouble is a collection of two mystery novellas by Graham Weaver, continuing the adventures of the sleuth Simon Templar a.k.a. "The Saint", created by Leslie Charteris. This is the first of three Saint books written by Weaver. Charteris, who served in an editorial capacity, received front cover author credit.

This book was first published in the United States in 1978 by The Crime Club. This was followed later the same year by the first British edition in paperback from Hodder and Stoughton's Cornet Books imprint. Publication of the book marked the 50th anniversary of The Saint, which had been introduced in 1928.

Both the stories in this collection were adaptations of episodes of Return of the Saint. This was the only Saint book published during the run of the short-lived series, although Salvage for the Saint was also based on the show.

== Stories ==
The book consisted of the following stories:

1. The Imprudent Professor (teleplay by Terence Feely) - based on a Return of the Saint episode
2. The Red Sabbath (story by John Kruse) - based on the Return of the Saint episode "One Black September"
