= Salvage for the Saint =

1983 novel by Leslie Charteris

- First edition UK hardcover
- Author: Peter Bloxsom and John Kruse, based on characters by Leslie Charteris
- Language: English
- Series: The Saint
- Genre: Mystery, novel
- Publisher: The Crime Club
- Publication date: 1983
- Publication place: United Kingdom
- Media type: Print (hardback & paperback)
- ISBN: 0-385-18992-3
- OCLC: 9394468
- Dewey Decimal: 823/.912 19
- LC Class: PR6005.H348 S47 1983
- Preceded by: Count on the Saint
- Followed by: The Saint (film novelization)

Salvage for the Saint is the title of a 1983 mystery novel featuring the character of Simon Templar, alias "The Saint". The novel was written by Peter Bloxsom, based on the two-part Return of the Saint episode "Collision Course" by John Kruse, but as was the custom at this time, the author credit on the cover went to Leslie Charteris, who created the Saint in 1928, and who served in an editorial capacity.

The two "Collision Course" episodes have also been syndicated as the made-for-TV film The Saint and the Brave Goose.

This was the 50th book of Simon Templar adventures. It was also the last to be published during the original 1928–1983 series of novels. Although Charteris had served more in an editorial or co-writer capacity on the Saint books since the early 1960s, he remained directly involved with them up to this point, making his 55-year tenure as official "chronicler" of the Saint one of the longest in Western fiction.

The book was first published in the United States by The Crime Club, and was followed thereafter by a United Kingdom edition from Hodder and Stoughton. This was also the last Saint book to be published by these two companies. The book is notable for including a rare reference to Patricia Holm, who was the Saint's girlfriend and adventuring partner in the early Saint novels and short stories, having last appeared within the short story collection Saint Errant, published in 1948.

Following publication of Salvage for the Saint, the decision was made to retire the character, although in 1984 Charteris attempted to revive The Saint Magazine, an anthology series that included stories featuring the character, among others; it only lasted for three issues. Charteris died in 1993; the next Saint books did not appear until 1997, when Burl Barer published a novelization based upon a film adaptation, and a limited-edition original novel.

== Story summary ==
To be added.
