= The Saint Steps In =

1943 novel by Leslie Charteris

- First edition (US)
- Author: Leslie Charteris
- Language: English
- Series: The Saint
- Genre: Mystery novel
- Publisher: The Crime Club (US); Hodder & Stoughton (UK)
- Publication date: 1943
- Publication place: United Kingdom
- Media type: Print (Hardback & Paperback)
- Preceded by: The Saint Goes West
- Followed by: The Saint on Guard

The Saint Steps In is a mystery novel by Leslie Charteris featuring his creation, Simon Templar, alias The Saint. The book was first published in serialized form in November 1942 in Liberty, with its first bound publication in 1943 in an American edition by The Crime Club. Hodder and Stoughton published the first British edition in 1943.

== Plot summary ==
In Washington, D.C., a young woman whose father has invented a new form of synthetic rubber requests Simon Templar's aid when she receives a threatening note. Before long, The Saint is drawn into a web of war-related intrigue involving what appear to be gangsters, but soon turns out to be groups with differing opinions as to what it takes to be patriotic. The book reveals that, instead of enlisting to fight in the war, Templar has instead been working behind the scenes, carrying out quiet missions against enemy agents and, unusually for the character, his efforts in this case are actually supported by law enforcement.

This is the third Saint book in a row to be set in the United States (previously most of Templar's adventures took place in England), following The Saint in Miami and The Saint Goes West, and direct reference is made to the Miami novel.

== References to other works ==
As was the case with the previous book, The Saint Goes West, The Saint Steps In includes in-jokes related to Simon Templar's "second career" as a B-movie hero (as a series of films featuring the character made by RKO Pictures was underway at the time of its publication). The start of Chapter 5 includes a character referring to The Falcon, another character appearing in B-movies at the time, as "a bargain-basement imitation" of Templar. The Falcon was in fact created as a competitor for the Saint and the film series even used some of the same actors who played Templar.
