= The Saint and the Templar Treasure =

1979 novel by Leslie Charteris

- UK hardcover edition
- Author: Graham Weaver and Donne Avenell, based on characters by Leslie Charteris
- Language: English
- Series: The Saint
- Genre: Mystery novel
- Publisher: The Crime Club
- Publication date: 1979
- Publication place: United Kingdom
- Media type: Print (Hardback & Paperback)
- Pages: 179 pp
- ISBN: 0-385-15097-0
- OCLC: 4835302
- Dewey Decimal: 823/.9/12
- LC Class: PZ3.C3855 Safap 1979 PR6005.H348
- Preceded by: The Saint in Trouble
- Followed by: Count on the Saint

The Saint and the Templar Treasure is the title of a 1979 mystery novel featuring the character of Simon Templar, alias "The Saint". The novel is written by Graham Weaver and Donne Avenell, but per the custom at this time, the author credit on the cover goes to Leslie Charteris, who created the Saint in 1928 and who served in an editorial capacity.

The book was first published in the United States by The Crime Club, and was followed thereafter by a United Kingdom edition from Hodder and Stoughton. The US edition adjusts the cover credit to read Leslie Charteris' The Saint and the Templar Treasure.

Following publication of this book, Charteris submitted for publication a novel entitled The Saint's Lady, written by a Saint fan named Joy Martin. This novel was not published, so the next book to appear was Count on the Saint.
