= Count On the Saint =

1980 book by Leslie Charteris

- US hardcover edition
- Author: Graham Weaver and Donne Avenell, based upon characters by Leslie Charteris
- Language: English
- Series: The Saint
- Genre: Mystery, Novellas
- Publisher: The Crime Club
- Publication date: 1980
- Publication place: United Kingdom
- Media type: Print (Hardback & Paperback)
- ISBN: 0-340-25384-3
- OCLC: 7818212
- Preceded by: The Saint and the Templar Treasure
- Followed by: Salvage for the Saint

Count On the Saint is a collection of two mystery novellas by Graham Weaver and Donne Avenell, continuing the adventures of the sleuth Simon Templar a.k.a. "The Saint", created by Leslie Charteris. Charteris served in an editorial capacity and received front-page author credit.

This book was first published in the United States in 1980 by The Crime Club, followed by a British edition by Hodder and Stoughton the same year.

This is the final collection of Saint novellas to be published to date; the final few volumes were full novels.

== Stories ==
The book consisted of the following stories:

1. The Pastor's Problem
2. The Unsaintly Santa
