= Saint Errant =

Book by Leslie Charteris

- First edition (US)
- Author: Leslie Charteris
- Language: English
- Series: The Saint
- Genre: Mystery, Short Stories
- Publisher: The Crime Club
- Publication date: 1948
- Publication place: United Kingdom
- Media type: Print (hardback & paperback)
- Preceded by: Call for the Saint
- Followed by: The Saint in Europe

Saint Errant is a collection of short stories by Leslie Charteris, first published in 1948 by The Crime Club in the United States and in 1949 by Hodder and Stoughton in the United Kingdom. This was the 28th book to feature the adventures of Simon Templar, alias "The Saint", and the first Saint short story collection since 1939's The Happy Highwayman. Several of the stories were based upon the then-current Saint comic strip, while the story "Judith" was first published in 1934 (the version featured in this book has been revised and updated, as have several other stories which were originally published in the 1930s).

Saint Errant was the first of several themed story collections that Charteris would publish over the next decade, the author having decided following Call for the Saint to focus on the short story format for Templar's adventures, rather than novels and novellas. In the case of Saint Errant, each story focuses on a different female acquaintance of Templar's.

This was the final book to feature Templar's longtime love interest and partner, Patricia Holm, a recurring character dating back to the first Saint novel, but who had only made a few story appearances over the preceding decade. Charteris decided that Templar should no longer be tied down to just one woman (although he had enjoyed romantic dalliances in several previous books, such as The Saint Sees it Through, suggesting his relationship with Holm was non-exclusive). Later continuation writers would not bring Holm back to the series (due primarily to most later books being adaptations of the 1960s TV series, in which she did not appear), although Charteris did attempt to get the novel The Saint's Lady (1979) published, and Holm appears in that work. There is also a brief reference to Holm in the final book of the series, Salvage for the Saint (1983), in which it is indicated that Holm left the relationship with Templar some time previously. In Saint Errant, Holm appears in the stories "Iris", "Lida" and "Luella," before making her exit from the series.

Most of the stories fall in the mystery/crime genre, except the closing story, "Dawn," which incorporates supernatural elements. "Dawn" also breaks the fourth wall by having Templar reference Charteris and his stories in dialogue.

The Saint book series went on hiatus after this release; the next Simon Templar story collection would not appear until 1953, although the character continued to appear in radio plays and comic strips during the interval. All further Saint books used the short story format until Vendetta for the Saint was published in 1963.

Some later reprint editions of the book, such as the 1981 reissue by Ace Charter, modify the title to read The Saint Errant.

== Stories ==
The book consists of 9 stories:

1. "Judith" a.k.a. "The Naughty Niece": Templar volunteers to help a young woman steal a set of valuable automobile plans from her crooked uncle.
2. "Iris" a.k.a. "The Old Routine": When Simon is accused of blackmailing several Chicago underworld leaders, Templar and Pat Holm investigate.
3. "Lida" a.k.a. "The Foolish Frail": A friend of Patricia's is murdered outside a Miami casino, putting the Saint and Holm on the trail of blackmailers.
4. "Jeannine" a.k.a. "The Lovely Sinner": This sequel to the opening story, "Judith", sees Templar reuniting with a female con-artist to steal a set of valuable pearls.
5. "Lucia" a.k.a. "The Homecoming of Amadeo Urselli": In the remote town of Saddlebag, Simon finds himself between two disparate Italian cousins and a kidnapping plot.
6. "Teresa" a.k.a. "The Uncertain Widow": In Mexico, Templar helps a woman track down a notorious bandit.
7. "Luella" a.k.a. "The Saint and the Double Badger": In Hollywood, Simon and Patricia (in her final appearance) take on a trio of con artists who targeted a war veteran.
8. "Emily" a.k.a. "The Doodlebug": After an elderly inventor dies, Simon takes possession of the man's metal detector (a.k.a. "Doodlebug") and uses it to avenge an elderly lady who has fallen victim to a gold mine scam.
9. "Dawn" a.k.a. "The Darker Drink": An encounter with a beautiful woman and a mysterious man leaves Simon uncertain as to what is and isn't real.

Some editions of the book use only the single female names for the titles of the different stories. Several stories were novelisations of radio show episodes.

== Television adaptations ==
All but two of the stories from this collection formed the basis for episodes of the 1962-69 TV series, The Saint. In all cases, the episode titles did not include the original stories' subtitles.

During the second season "Judith" aired on 3 October 1963, followed by "Teresa" on 10 October, "Iris" on 7 November and "Luella" on 23 January 1964. "Lucia" was retitled "Sophia" and aired on 27 February 1964. During the third season, "Lida" aired on 15 October 1964 and "Jeannine" followed on 22 October.
