= The Saint Goes West =

Collection of novellas by Leslie Charteris

- First edition (US)
- Author: Leslie Charteris
- Language: English
- Series: The Saint
- Genre: Mystery fiction
- Publisher: The Crime Club (US); Hodder & Stoughton (UK)
- Publication date: 1942
- Publication place: United Kingdom
- Media type: Print (hardback & paperback)
- Preceded by: The Saint in Miami
- Followed by: The Saint Steps In

The Saint Goes West is a collection of three mystery novellas by Leslie Charteris, first published in the United States in 1942 by The Crime Club, and in the United Kingdom the same year by Hodder and Stoughton.

This book continues the adventures of Charteris' creation, Simon Templar, alias The Saint, and is the first of several volumes of Saint stories that would follow the theme of the Saint travelling around the world, although in this case all the stories take place in the United States (and can be said to follow on from the previous book, The Saint in Miami). All three stories centre on Templar visiting the southwestern US, with the first story being a World War II-related espionage story, continuing the wartime theme established in The Saint in Miami which would continue in the next book, The Saint Steps In.

Charteris would continue this "travelogue-mystery" theme a decade later with The Saint in Europe and successive volumes.

== Stories ==
The book consisted of the following stories, which are standalone adventures although the third story makes reference to the first two:

1. Arizona – Templar travels to the American West in pursuit of a Nazi scientist who plans to take over a ranch in order to mine the mercury located beneath, with the mineral destined for German munitions.
2. Palm Springs – An alcoholic millionaire begins receiving death threats after he helps police track down (and kill) a gangster. He hires Templar to "guard his body" which soon threatens to become a literal instruction. Meanwhile, Templar finds himself distracted by the millionaire's trio of live-in girlfriends. This story describes a character reading a mystery novel published by The Crime Club, American publishers of the Saint books, and ends with a metafictional reference to the Saint book series itself, as well as the Hays Production Code, a possible reference to the story's being a novelization of a film story treatment (see below).
3. Hollywood – As word spreads of his recent adventures in Arizona and Palm Springs, Templar receives an offer to star in a motion picture about his life, spearheaded by a mobster-turned-movie producer. But when the producer is murdered, Templar finds himself playing another role - that of detective.

Some editions, such as the 1948 printing by Avon Books, omit the World War II-era story "Arizona", although references to it remain in "Hollywood".

== Film and television adaptations ==
The story "Palm Springs" is based upon a story treatment Charteris wrote for RKO Pictures. The resulting film, The Saint in Palm Springs, was released in 1941 and starred George Sanders in his final appearance as Simon Templar. The script used in the film was substantially different from the original storyline. Charteris later novelized his original story for The Saint Goes West, making this, in essence, the first Saint novelization (more would follow based upon the television series). The film's plotline involves a collection of rare stamps and incorporates the character of Inspector Fernack, who does not appear in the novella.

In 1960, "Palm Springs" was adapted very loosely for the French film Le Saint Mene la danse which was produced by Films Du Cyclope and Lux Films and starred Felix Marten as Templar. This marks, to date, the only time a Charteris story has been used as source material by two different productions.

"Arizona" and "Hollywood" were both adapted as episodes of the 1962-1969 television series. "Hollywood" was adapted as "Starring the Saint" which aired on September 26, 1963, in the second season. "Arizona" formed the basis of the episode "The Sign of the Claw" which was shown as part of the third season on February 4, 1965.
