= Thanks to the Saint =

Collection of short stories by Leslie Charteris

- First edition
- Author: Leslie Charteris
- Language: English
- Series: The Saint
- Genre: Mystery, Short Stories
- Publisher: The Crime Club
- Publication date: 1957
- Publication place: United Kingdom
- Media type: Print (hardback & paperback)
- Preceded by: The Saint Around the World
- Followed by: Señor Saint

Thanks to the Saint is a collection of short stories by Leslie Charteris, first published in December 1957 by The Crime Club in the United States and by Hodder and Stoughton in the United Kingdom in 1958.

== Stories ==
The book consisted of 6 stories:

1. "The Bunco Artists"
2. "The Happy Suicide"
3. "The Good Medicine"
4. "The Unescapable Word" (sic)
5. "The Perfect Sucker"
6. "The Careful Terrorist"

== Television adaptations ==
All but one of the stories in this collection formed the basis for episodes of the 1962-69 TV series, The Saint.

"The Careful Terrorist" appeared as the third episode of the first season, airing on 18 October 1962. "The Bunco Artists" and "The Good Medicine" appeared in season two, on 19 December 1963 and 6 February 1964 respectively. "The Unescapable Word" was retitled to the more grammatically correct "The Inescapable Word" and aired on 28 January 1965 during season 3, followed by "The Happy Suicide" on 11 March.
