= Señor Saint =

- First UK edition
- Author: Leslie Charteris
- Language: English
- Series: The Saint
- Genre: Mystery, Short Stories
- Publisher: The Crime Club (US); Hodder & Stoughton (UK)
- Publication date: 1958 (US) 1959 (UK)
- Publication place: United Kingdom
- Media type: Print (hardback & paperback)
- Preceded by: Thanks to the Saint
- Followed by: The Saint to the Rescue

Señor Saint is a collection of short stories by Leslie Charteris that first appeared in The Saint Detective Magazine. Although this collection was first published in 1958 by The Crime Club in the United States and by Hodder and Stoughton in the United Kingdom in 1959, the individual stories date from 1954 and 1955. The stories continue the adventures of Simon Templar, alias "The Saint" and coincided with the 30th anniversary of the introduction of the character.

== Stories ==
The book consists of 4 stories:

1. "The Pearls of Peace"
2. "The Revolution Racket"
3. "The Romantic Matron"
4. "The Golden Frog"

== Television adaptations ==
All four stories in this collection formed the basis for episodes of the 1962-69 TV series, The Saint.

"The Pearls of Peace" aired during the first season, on November 8, 1962. "The Romantic Matron" aired during the second season (January 16, 1964), while the remaining two stories, "Revolution Racket" and "Golden Frog", aired during the third season on November 5, 1964, and February 11, 1965, respectively.
