= Adam Rayner =

English actor (b. 1977)

- Born: 1977 (age 48–49); Shrewsbury, Shropshire, England
- Occupation: Actor
- Years active: 2001–present
- Spouse: Lucy Brown (m. 2015)
- Children: 2

Adam Rayner (born 1977) is an English actor. He is known for television roles including: Dominic Montgomery in Mistresses, Dr. Steve Shaw in Hawthorne, Aidan Marsh in Hunted, Bassam "Barry" Al-Fayeed in Tyrant, and Tal-Rho in Superman & Lois. He has also appeared on stage in The Rivals (Bristol Old Vic, 2004), Romeo and Juliet (Royal Shakespeare Theatre, 2006), and Much Ado About Nothing (Novello, 2006).

== Career ==
Rayner studied at Durham University and after graduating completed a two-year acting course at LAMDA.

He made an appearance as 'Dr. Gail' in the 2010 Christmas Special 'The Perfect Christmas' episode of the BBC sitcom Miranda alongside regulars Sally Phillips, Miranda Hart, Tom Ellis, Sarah Hadland and Patricia Hodge, and his character returned in the fourth episode of the third series, titled "Je Regret Nothing".

In November 2012, it was announced that Rayner was cast as Simon Templar in a pilot for a new television series of The Saint, based on the character. Principal photography began on Monday, 17 December 2012 in Pacific Palisades, California. Executive producer Roger Moore was unable to sell the pilot. It was ultimately released in 2017 following Moore's death.

Rayner was cast as the lead in the FX television series, Tyrant, which ran from June 2014 to September 2016. In 2021, Rayner was cast as Morgan Edge / Tal-Rho in the superhero drama television series Superman & Lois.

In August 2022, it was announced that Rayner was cast in a new, main role for the third season of Max television series Warrior.

== Personal life ==
Rayner's mother is American and his father is English and also holds a dual citizenship for the United Kingdom and the United States. He married actress Lucy Brown, on New Year's Eve 2015. They have a son together, Jack, born 28 December 2014, and a daughter, Annie Rose, born 11 July 2017.

== Filmography ==
=== Film ===
Year	Title	Role	Notes
2003	The Goodbye Plane	Leonard aged 20	Short film
2004	The Rivals	Captain Jack Absolute	
2005	RedMeansGo	Sam	
2006	Love and Other Disasters	Tom / Fantasy David	
2007	Straightheads	Jago	
2007	Steel Trap	Adam	
2011	The Task	Taylor	
2015	Tracers	Miller	
2021	Everything I Ever Wanted to Tell My Daughter About Men	Campbell Scott	

=== Television ===
Year	Title	Role	Notes
2003	At Home with the Braithwaites	Nick Bottomley	6 episodes
2004	Making Waves	Lt. Sam Quartermaine	Episode: "Episode 2"
2005	Vincent	James O'Connor	Episode: "The Prodigal Son"
2005, 2007	Sensitive Skin	Greg	3 episodes
2006	The Line of Beauty	Ricky	Miniseries; episode: "To Whom Do You Beautifully Belong"
2008–2010	Mistresses	Dominic Montgomery	Main role; 16 episodes
2008	Doctor Who	Roger Curbishley	Episode: "The Unicorn and the Wasp"
2010	Abroad	Edward Walpole	Television film
2010–2011	Hawthorne	Dr. Steve Shaw	Main role (seasons 2–3); 20 episodes
2010, 2013	Miranda	Dr. Gail	2 episodes
2011	Waking the Dead	Piers Kennedy	2 episodes
2011	Dragon Age: Redemption	Cairn	Web series; 6 episodes
2012	Undercovers	Tomas Hauptman	Episode: "Dark Cover"
2012	Hunted	Aidan Marsh	Main role; 8 episodes
2013	The Whale	Captain Pollard	Television film
2014–2016	Tyrant	Bassam "Barry" Al-Fayeed	Main role; 32 episodes
2016	Notorious	DA Max Gilford	6 episodes
2017	The Saint	Simon Templar	Television film
2019	The Fix	Matthew Collier	Main role
2021–2022	Superman & Lois	Tal-Rho / Morgan Edge / Eradicator, Bizarro Tal-Rho	Main role (season 1); Recurring role (season 2); 16 episodes
2023	Warrior	Douglas Strickland	Main Role
2025	Midsomer Murders	Harry Peterson	Episode: "Lawn of the Dead"

== Theatre credits ==
Year	Title	Role	Venue	Notes
2001	The Play Room	Weasel	Finborough Theatre, London	
2002	This Is Our Youth	Dennis	Garrick Theatre, London	
2004	The Rivals	Captain Jack Absolute	Bristol Old Vic, Bristol	
2005	The Postman Always Rings Twice	Barlow	Playhouse Theatre, London	
2006	King John	Essex	Swan Theatre, Stratford-upon-Avon	
2006	Much Ado About Nothing	Claudio	Swan Theatre, Stratford-upon-Avon	
2006	Romeo and Juliet	Tybalt	Royal Shakespeare Theatre, Stratford-upon-Avon	
2008	Beau Jest	Bob	Hackney Empire, London	
2015	Someone Who'll Watch Over Me	Adam	Chichester Festival Theatre, Chichester	
