= The Saint Around the World =

1956 collection of short stories by Leslie Charteris

- First edition (US)
- Author: Leslie Charteris
- Language: English language
- Series: The Saint
- Genre: Mystery, Short Stories
- Publisher: The Crime Club
- Publication date: 1956
- Publication place: United Kingdom
- Media type: Print (hardback & paperback)
- Preceded by: The Saint on the Spanish Main
- Followed by: Thanks to the Saint

The Saint Around the World is a collection of six short stories by Leslie Charteris, first published in 1956 by The Crime Club in the United States and by Hodder and Stoughton in the United Kingdom in 1957. This book continues the adventures of Simon Templar, alias The Saint, and is the third of three consecutive books that take a "travelogue" approach to the stories, with each taking place in a different exotic locale; Charteris would later return to this theme with The Saint in the Sun.

This book features the final regular appearance of Chief Inspector Claud Eustace Teal in the English-language Saint series (and in fact it is his first appearance in the series since 1939's The Happy Highwayman); he would appear again in one of the French pastiche novels, based upon The Saint.

== Stories ==
The book consisted of 6 stories:

1. Bermuda: The Patient Playboy
2. England: The Talented Husband
3. France: The Reluctant Nudist
4. Middle East: The Lovelorn Sheik
5. Malaya: The Pluperfect Lady
6. Vancouver: The Sporting Chance - while on the trail of drug-runners, the Saint meets a member of the Royal Canadian Mounted Police who turns out to be the niece of Norman Kent, from The Last Hero.

== Television adaptations ==
Three stories from this collection formed the basis for episodes of the 1962-69 TV series, The Saint.

"The Talented Husband" has the distinction of being the very first episode of the series to be broadcast, on 4 October 1962 (thereby also making it the first Charteris story to be adapted by the series). "The Sporting Chance" appeared on 12 December 1963, during the second season. "The Reluctant Nudist" was adapted as "The Persistent Parasites" and was broadcast on 29 July 1965, as part of the fourth season.
