= Call for the Saint =

1948 book by Leslie Charteris

- First UK edition
- Author: Leslie Charteris
- Language: English
- Series: The Saint
- Genre: Mystery fiction
- Publisher: The Crime Club (US); Hodder & Stoughton (UK)
- Publication date: 1948
- Publication place: United Kingdom
- Media type: Print (hardback & paperback)
- Preceded by: The Saint Sees it Through
- Followed by: Saint Errant

Call for the Saint is a collection of two mystery novellas by Leslie Charteris, first published in the United States in 1948 by The Crime Club, and later the same year in the United Kingdom by Hodder and Stoughton. This book continues the adventures of Charteris' creation, Simon Templar, alias The Saint. "The Masked Angel" features the first literary appearance of Patricia Holm, Templar's on-again, off-again partner/girlfriend, since the 1940s novel The Saint in Miami.

This was the final volume in which Charteris himself used the novella format for telling his stories; the format would be revived again in the 1960s, by which time other authors were writing the stories, with Charteris usually receiving lead writer credit while acting in an editorial capacity. For the remainder of his time writing the series, Charteris would use the short story format and the next Templar book to feature novellas would be The Saint on TV, published in 1968, with featured adaptations of episodes from the 1962-68 television series based on the character.

== Stories ==
The book consists of the following stories:

1. The King of The Beggars: Templar and Hoppy are recruited by a theatre actress to investigate the murder of a beggar and a criminal ring shaking down other needy people.
2. The Masked Angel: When a boxer dies in the ring under mysterious circumstances, the Saint, Hoppy and Pat Holm investigate in hopes of preventing the Masked Angel from claiming another victim. A minor character in this story later plays a major role in one of the short stories featured in the 1955 collection The Saint on the Spanish Main.

The two stories do not narratively connect with the preceding novel, The Saint Sees it Through, beyond Templar still working in the United States, and a reference to his wartime activities. Most notably, the character of Avalon Dexter, introduced in the preceding book as a new romantic (and adventure) partner for Templar, cast in the same vein as Patricia Holm, is absent without explanation, with Templar once again working with his earlier partners, Hoppy and Patricia.

== Television adaptation ==
"The King of the Beggars" was adapted as an episode of the TV series The Saint which first aired on November 14, 1963 during the second season. "The Masked Angel" was retitled "The Crooked Ring" and adapted during its fourth season, first airing on July 15, 1965.
