= The Saint Meets the Tiger =

1943 film by Paul L. Stein

- Original film poster
- Directed by: Paul L. Stein
- Written by: Leslie Arliss; Wolfgang Wilhelm; James Seymour
- Based on: Meet - The Tiger! 1928 novel by Leslie Charteris
- Produced by: William Sistrom
- Starring: Hugh Sinclair; Jean Gillie; Gordon McLeod
- Cinematography: Robert Krasker
- Edited by: Ralph Kemplen
- Production company: RKO Radio British Productions
- Distributed by: RKO Radio Pictures (UK); Republic Pictures (US)
- Release dates: 8 December 1941 (UK); 29 July 1943 (US)
- Running time: 70 minutes
- Country: United Kingdom
- Language: English

The Saint Meets the Tiger is a 1941 British mystery thriller film directed by Paul L. Stein and starring Hugh Sinclair, Jean Gillie and Clifford Evans. It was made by the British unit of RKO Pictures and released the same year, but was not distributed until 1943 in America. This was to be the last of the eight films in RKO's film series about the crimefighter the Saint. It was shot at Denham Studios outside London with sets designed by the art director Paul Sheriff. The previous entries in the series had all been made in Hollywood except The Saint's Vacation.

== Plot ==
Simon "The Saint" Templar finds a dead man on his doorstep. Soon the ace investigator finds himself mired in more murder, smuggling and a South American mine.

== Cast ==
- Hugh Sinclair as Simon Templar (The Saint)
- Jean Gillie as Pat Holm
- Gordon McLeod as Insp. Claud Teal / Prof. Karn
- Clifford Evans as Tidemarsh / The Tiger
- Wylie Watson as Horace (Templar's butler)
- Dennis Arundell as Lionel Bentley
- Charles Victor as Bittle
- Louise Hampton as Aunt Agatha Gurten
- John Salew as Merridon (curator of the Baycome Museum)
- Arthur Hambling as Police constable
- Amy Veness as Mrs. Donald Jones
- Claude Bailey as Donald Jones
- Noel Dainton as Burton (Bentley's butler)
- Eric Clavering as Frankie
- Ben Williams as Joe Gallo
- Joan Hickson as Mary (Aunt Agatha's maid)
- John Slater as Eddie
- Tony Quinn as Paddy
- Alf Goddard as Tailor

== Release ==
After The Saint's Vacation (1941), Hugh Sinclair makes his second (and final) appearance as Templar in this adventure, which sees Templar investigating a dead body left on his doorstep. This leads him to a quiet seaside village in Cornwall where he pursues a mysterious villain known as The Tiger. Co-starring in the film is Jean Gillie as Templar's love interest, Patricia Holm. Although this character made many appearances in the book series, this is to date the only film in which she appears. The character next appears on screen portrayed by Eliza Dushku in an unaired pilot for a Saint TV series produced in the 2010s.

Because of a dispute between RKO and the Saint's creator, Leslie Charteris, the film was put on hold after shooting finished in June 1941. The reason for the dispute was that RKO was about to release The Gay Falcon in October 1941, the first film in their new Falcon series, and Leslie Charteris felt that the Falcon was nothing but a copy of his character, enhanced by the fact that George Sanders played the Falcon. He was the most established face of the Saint, after having played the character in five of the previous films, the last being released earlier the same year. RKO eventually sold the US distribution rights to Republic Pictures, while its British arm handled the UK distribution as planned, and the film was released in both countries in 1943.

The Saint Meets the Tiger is an adaptation of Charteris' first Saint novel, Meet - The Tiger!, and was the last Saint novel adapted by the RKO series. In a sense, it was also the last film in the RKO series, as the final film, The Saint's Return did not come until ten years later and was produced and distributed in the UK by British Hammer Films, while RKO only handled the US distribution.
