= The Saint on Guard =

1944 novel by Leslie Charteris

The Saint on Guard also The Saint and the Sizzling Saboteur
- First edition (US)
- Author: Leslie Charteris
- Language: English
- Series: The Saint
- Genre: Mystery fiction
- Publisher: The Crime Club
- Publication date: 1944
- Publication place: United Kingdom
- Media type: Print (hardback & paperback)
- Preceded by: The Saint Steps In
- Followed by: The Saint Sees it Through

The Saint on Guard is a collection of two mystery novellas by Leslie Charteris, first published in the United States in 1944 by The Crime Club, and in the United Kingdom in 1945 by Hodder and Stoughton. This book continues the adventures of Charteris' creation, Simon Templar, alias The Saint, and features the last of the Saint's World War II-themed adventures that had begun with The Saint in Miami. Both stories had previously been serialized in magazines in 1942 and 1943.

The two novellas featured in this book were also published individually by some publishers. "The Black Market" was published as The Saint on Guard by Avon Books in the 1950, while "The Sizzling Saboteur" was published as The Saint and the Sizzling Saboteur by Avon and by Charter Books in the 1980s.

== Stories ==
The book consisted of the following stories:

1. The Black Market - When a shipment of iridium needed for the production of Allied weapons and equipment is hijacked and put on the black market, Templar hatches a scheme to recover the goods, supported by his shady US intelligence contacts and much to the chagrin of NYPD Inspector Fernack. But when one of his prime leads is murdered, Templar finds himself framed for the crime.
2. The Sizzling Saboteur - The Saint travels to Galveston, Texas in pursuit of a man who has been sabotaging weapons factories, but when his quarry turns up burned to crisp, he has to contend with both the local police, a trio of mysterious men behind the sabotage, and a beautiful Russian. The story includes an element of metafiction as the name Leslie Charteris is mentioned within the story.

== Television adaptation ==
Both stories in this collection were adapted as episodes of the TV series The Saint.

The Sizzling Saboteur was retitled The Fellow Traveller and first was broadcast as the first episode of the second series on 19 September 1963. The Black Market was retitled The Rough Diamonds and was broadcast on 21 November 1963, also as part of the second series.
