= The Saint (Simon Templar) =

Fictional character invented by Leslie Charteris

Simon Templar
- The Saint character
- The sign of the Saint
- First appearance: Meet the Tiger
- Created by: Leslie Charteris
- Portrayed by: Louis Hayward; George Sanders; Vincent Price; Roger Moore; Ian Ogilvy; Simon Dutton; Val Kilmer; Tom Conway; Edgar Barrier; Brian Aherne; Hugh Sinclair; Adam Rayner; others

In-universe information
- Aliases: The Saint; Sebastian Tombs; Sugarman Treacle
- Gender: Male
- Occupation: Thief; amateur detective; occasional British intelligence agent; occasional police agent; lawyer (classified)
- Nationality: British

Simon Templar, nicknamed The Saint, is a fictional character in a series of novels and short stories by Leslie Charteris published between 1928 and 1963. After that date other authors collaborated with Charteris on books until 1983; two additional works produced without Charteris's participation were published in 1997. The character has also been portrayed in the franchise The Saint, which includes motion pictures, radio dramas, comic strips, comic books, and three television series.

== Overview ==
=== Simon Templar ===
Simon Templar is a Robin Hood–like figure known as the Saint—from his initials, per The Saint Meets the Tiger, and the reader is told that he was given the nickname at the age of nineteen. In addition, per Knight Templar:

Meet the Saint.
His godfathers and his godmothers, at his baptism, had bestowed upon him the name of Simon Templar; but that coincidence of initials was not the only reason for the nickname by which he was far more widely known. One day, the story of how he came by that nickname may be told: it is a good story, in its way, though it goes back to the days when the Saint was nineteen, and almost as respectable as he looked. But the name had stuck. It was inevitable that it should stick, for obviously it had been destined to him from the beginning.

Templar has aliases, often using the initials S.T. such as "Sebastian Tombs" or "Sugarman Treacle". Blessed with boyish humour, he makes humorous remarks and leaves a "calling card" at his "crimes," a stick figure of a man with a halo over his head. This is used as the logo of the books, the films, and the three TV series. Supposedly, the stick figure was created by Charteris when he was a boy, "...drawing cartoons for his own four-page magazine at 10...."

He is described as "a buccaneer in the suits of Savile Row, amused, cool, debonair, with hell-for-leather blue eyes and a saintly smile".

His origin remains a mystery; he is explicitly British, but in early books (e.g., Meet the Tiger) there are references which suggest that he had spent some time in the United States battling Prohibition villains. Presumably, his acquaintance with Bronx sidekick Hoppy Uniatz dates from this period. In the books, his income is derived from the pockets of the "ungodly" (as he terms those who live by a lesser moral code than his own), whom he is given to "socking on the boko." There are references to a "ten percent collection fee" to cover expenses when he extracts large sums from victims, the remainder being returned to the owners, given to charity, shared among Templar's colleagues, or some combination of those possibilities.

Templar's targets include corrupt politicians, warmongers, and other low life. "He claims he's a Robin Hood," says one victim, "but to me he's just a robber and a hood." Robin Hood appears to be one inspiration for the character; Templar stories were often promoted as featuring "The Robin Hood of modern crime," and this phrase to describe Templar appears in several stories. A term used by Templar to describe his acquisitions is "boodle," a term also applied to the short story collection.

The Saint has a dark side, as he is willing to ruin the lives of the "ungodly," and even kill them, if he feels that more innocent lives can be saved. In the early books, Templar refers to this as murder, although he considers his actions justified and righteous, a view usually shared by partners and colleagues. Several adventures centre on his intention to kill. (For example, "Arizona" in The Saint Goes West has Templar planning to kill a Nazi scientist.)

During the 1920s and early 1930s, the Saint is fighting European arms dealers, drug runners, and white slavers while based in his London home. His battles with Rayt Marius mirror the "four rounds with Carl Petersen" of Bulldog Drummond. During the first half of the 1940s, Charteris cast Templar as a willing operative of the American government, fighting Nazi interests in the United States during World War II.

Beginning with the "Arizona" novella, Templar is fighting his own war against Germany. The Saint Steps In reveals that Templar is operating on behalf of a mysterious American government official known as Hamilton who appears again in the next WWII-era Saint book, The Saint on Guard, and Templar is shown continuing to act as a secret agent for Hamilton in the first post-war novel, The Saint Sees it Through. The later books move from confidence games, murder mysteries, and wartime espionage, and place Templar as a global adventurer.

According to Saint historian Burl Barer, Charteris made the decision to remove Templar from his usual confidence-game trappings, not to mention his usual co-stars Uniatz, girlfriend Patricia Holm, valet Orace, and police foil Claud Eustace Teal, as they were all inappropriate for the post-war stories he was writing.

Although the Saint functions as an ordinary detective in some stories, others depict ingenious plots to get even with vanity publishers and other rip-off artists, greedy bosses who exploit their workers, con men, etc.

Charteris gave Templar interests and quirks as the series went on. Early talents as an amateur poet and songwriter were displayed, often to taunt villains, though the novella The Inland Revenue established that poetry was also a hobby. That story revealed that Templar had written an adventure novel featuring a South American hero not far removed from The Saint himself.

Templar also on occasion would break the fourth wall in an almost metafictional sense, making references to being part of a story and mentioning in one early story how he cannot be killed so early on; the 1960s television series would also have Templar address viewers. Charteris in his narrative also frequently breaks the fourth wall by making references to the "chronicler" of the Saint's adventures and directly addressing the reader. In the story "The Sizzling Saboteur" in The Saint on Guard Charteris inserts his own name. In the story "Judith" in Saint Errant is the line, "'This,' the Saint said to nobody in particular, 'sounds like one of those stories that fellow Charteris might write.'" Furthermore, in the 1955 story "The Unkind Philanthropist," published in the collection The Saint on the Spanish Main, Templar states outright that (in his fictional universe) his adventures are indeed written about by a man named Leslie Charteris.

=== Other recurring characters ===
The Saint has many partners, though none last throughout the series. For the first half until the late 1940s, the most recurrent is Patricia Holm, his girlfriend, who was introduced in the first story, the 1928 novel Meet the Tiger, in which she shows herself a capable adventurer. Holm appeared erratically throughout the series, sometimes disappearing for books at a time. Templar and Holm lived together in a time when common-law relationships were uncommon and, in some areas, illegal.

They have an easy, non-binding relationship, as Templar is shown flirting with other women from time to time. However, his heart remains true to Holm in the early books, culminating in his considering marriage in the novella The Melancholy Journey of Mr. Teal, only to have Holm say that she had no interest in marrying. Holm disappeared in the late 1940s, and according to Barer's history of The Saint, Charteris refused to allow Templar a steady girlfriend, or Holm to return. (However, according to the Saintly Bible website, Charteris did write a film story that would have seen Templar encountering a son he had had with Holm.) Holm's final appearance as a character was in the short stories "Iris," "Lida," and "Luella," contained within the 1948 collection Saint Errant; the next direct reference to her does not appear in print until the 1983 novel Salvage for the Saint.

Another recurring character, Scotland Yard Inspector Claud Eustace Teal, could be found attempting to put the Saint behind bars, although in some books they work in partnership. In The Saint in New York, Teal's American counterpart, NYPD Inspector John Henry Fernack, was introduced, and he would become, like Teal, an Inspector Lestrade-like foil and pseudo-nemesis in a number of books, notably the American-based World War II novels of the 1940s.

Many Saint novels were reprinted in new editions in the 1960s to capitalise on the popular television series, starring Roger Moore.

The Saint had a band of compatriots, including Roger Conway, Norman Kent, Archie Sheridan, Richard "Dicky" Tremayne (a name that appeared in the 1990s TV series, Twin Peaks), Peter Quentin, Monty Hayward, and his ex-military valet, Orace.

In later stories, the dim-witted and constantly soused but reliable American thug Hoppy Uniatz was at Templar's side. Of the Saint's companions, only Norman Kent was killed during an adventure (he sacrifices himself to save Templar in the novel The Last Hero); the other males are presumed to have settled down and married (two to former female criminals: Dicky Tremayne to "Straight Audrey" Perowne and Peter Quentin to Kathleen "The Mug" Allfield; Archie Sheridan is mentioned to have married in "The Lawless Lady" in Enter the Saint, presumably to Lilla McAndrew after the events of the story "The Wonderful War" in Featuring the Saint).

=== The Hirondel ===
The Hirondel (sometimes misspelled as Hirondelle) is a fictional car driven by Simon Templar. The Hirondel is an opulent, eight-cylinder, cream and red vehicle costing £5,000 and is a recurring element in many of The Saint books. The Hirondel is also used by Storm (Captain Arden) in the non-Saint novel Daredevil. Daredevil also features inspector Teal. The Hirondel was featured in a 1972 issue of Automobile Quarterly (Vol. 10 No. 1).

== Publishing history ==
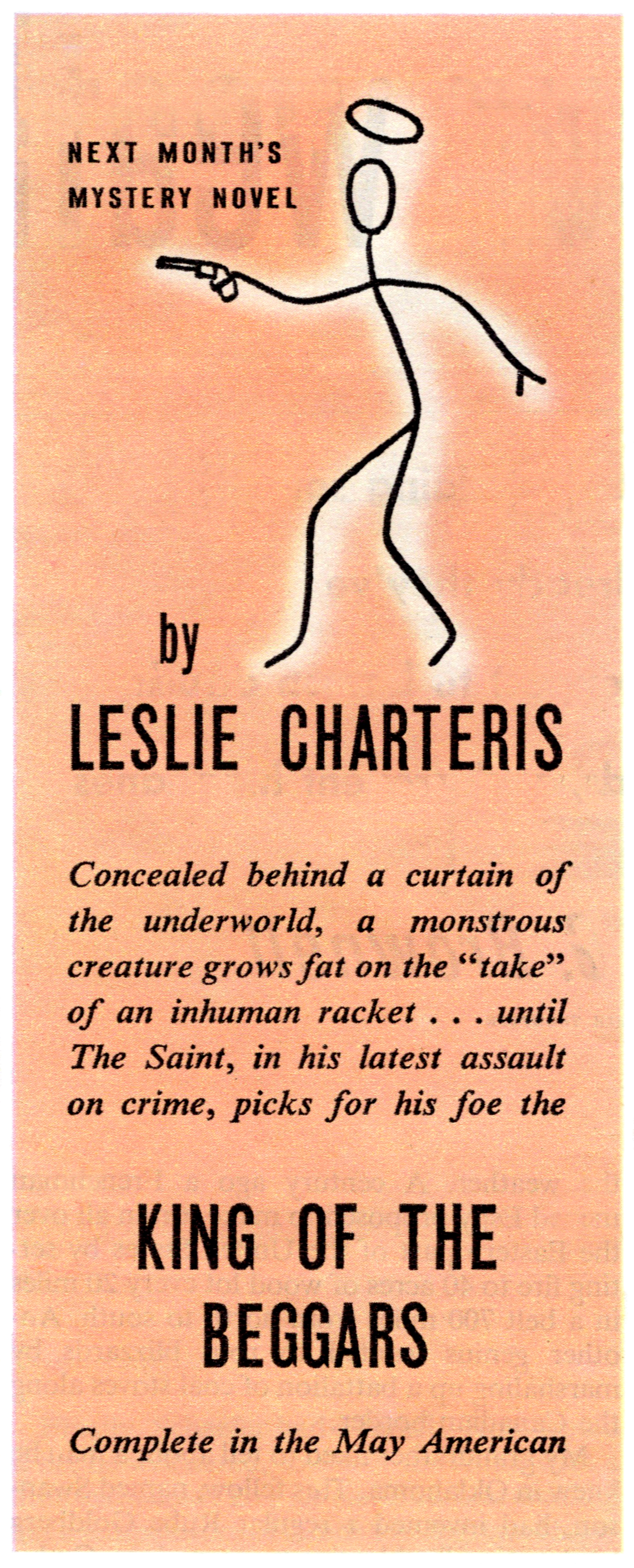
A novella published in The American Magazine in May 1947, "The King of the Beggars" was collected in Call for the Saint (1948)

The origins of the Saint can be found in early works by Charteris, some of which predated the first Saint novel, 1928's Meet the Tiger, or were written after it but before Charteris committed to writing a Saint series. Burl Barer reveals that an obscure early work, Daredevil, not only featured a heroic lead who shared "Saintly" traits (down to driving the same make of car) but also shared his adventures with Inspector Claud Eustace Teal—a character later a regular in Saint books. Barer writes that several early Saint stories were rewritten from non-Saint stories, including the novel She Was a Lady, which appeared in magazine form featuring a different lead character.

Charteris utilized three formats for delivering his stories. Besides full-length novels, he wrote novellas for the most part published in magazines, notably developing the character in the pages of the British story-paper The Thriller under the tutelage of Monty Hayden, who was developing the ″Desperado″ character type for the magazine, and these were later collected in hardback books collecting two or three stories per volume. He also wrote short stories featuring the character, again mostly for magazines and later compiled into omnibus editions. In later years these short stories carried a common theme, such as the women Templar meets or exotic places he visits. With the exception of Meet the Tiger, chapter titles of Templar novels usually contain a descriptive phrase describing the events of the chapter; for example, Chapter Four of Knight Templar is titled "How Simon Templar dozed in the Green Park and discovered a new use for toothpaste".

Although Charteris's novels and novellas had more conventional thriller plots than his confidence game short stories, both novels and stories are admired. As in the past, the appeal lies in the vitality of the character, a hero who can go into a brawl and come out with his hair combed and who, faced with death, lights a cigarette and taunts his enemy with the signature phrase "As the actress said to the bishop ..."

The period of the books begins in the 1920s and moves to the 1970s as the 50 books progress (the character being seemingly ageless). In early books most activities are illegal, although directed at villains. In later books, this becomes less so. In books written during World War II, the Saint was recruited by the government to help track spies and similar undercover work. Later he became a cold warrior fighting Communism. The quality of writing also changes; early books have a freshness which becomes replaced by cynicism in later works. A few Saint stories crossed into science fiction and fantasy, "The Man Who Liked Ants" and the early novel The Last Hero being examples; one Saint short story, "The Darker Drink" (also published as "Dawn"), was even published in the October 1952 issue of The Magazine of Fantasy & Science Fiction. When early Saint books were republished in the 1960s to the 1980s, it was not uncommon to see freshly written introductions by Charteris apologizing for the out-of-date tone; according to a Charteris "apology" in a 1969 paperback of Featuring the Saint, he attempted to update some earlier stories when they were reprinted but gave up and let them sit as period pieces. The 1963 edition of the short story collection The Happy Highwayman contains examples of abandoned revisions; in one story published in the 1930s ("The Star Producers"), references to actors of the 1930s were replaced for 1963 with names of current movie stars; another 1930s-era story, "The Man Who Was Lucky", added references to atomic power. Although Templar is depicted as ageless, Charteris occasionally acknowledged the passing of time for those around him, such as in the 1956 short story collection The Saint Around the World which features the retirement of Inspector Teal in one story.

Charteris started retiring from writing books following 1963's The Saint in the Sun. The next book to carry Charteris's name, 1964's Vendetta for the Saint, was written by science fiction author Harry Harrison, who had worked on the Saint comic strip, after which Charteris edited and revised the manuscript. Between 1964 and 1983, another 14 Saint books would be published, credited to Charteris but written by others. In his introduction to the first, The Saint on TV, Charteris called these volumes a team effort in which he oversaw selection of stories, initially adaptations of scripts written for the 1962–1969 TV series The Saint, and with Fleming Lee writing the adaptations (other authors took over from Lee). Charteris and Lee collaborated on two Saint novels in the 1970s, The Saint in Pursuit (based on a story by Charteris for the Saint comic strip) and The Saint and the People Importers. The "team" writers were usually credited on the title page, if not the cover. One later volume, Catch the Saint, was an experiment in returning The Saint to his period, prior to World War II (as opposed to recent Saint books set in the present day). Several later volumes also adapted scripts from the 1970s revival TV series Return of the Saint.

The last Saint volume in the line of books starting with Meet the Tiger in 1928 was Salvage for the Saint, published in 1983. According to the Saintly Bible website, every Saint book published between 1928 and 1983 saw the first edition issued by Hodder & Stoughton in the United Kingdom (a company that originally published only religious books) and The Crime Club (an imprint of Doubleday that specialized in mystery and detective fiction) in the United States. For the first 20 years, the books were first published in Britain, with the United States edition following up to a year later. By the late 1940s to early 1950s, this situation had been reversed. In one case—The Saint to the Rescue—a British edition did not appear until nearly two years after the American one.

French language books published over 30 years included translated volumes of Charteris originals as well as novelisations of radio scripts from the English-language radio series and comic strip adaptations. Many of these books credited to Charteris were written by others, including Madeleine Michel-Tyl.

Charteris died in 1993. Two additional Saint novels appeared around the time of the 1997 film starring Val Kilmer: a novelisation of the film (which had little connection to the Charteris stories) and Capture the Saint, a more faithful work published by The Saint Club (originated by Charteris in 1936). Both books were written by Burl Barer, who in the early 1990s published a history of the character in books, radio, and television.

Charteris wrote 14 novels between 1928 and 1971 (the last two co-written), 34 novellas, and 95 short stories featuring Simon Templar. Between 1963 and 1997, an additional seven novels and fourteen novellas were written by others. In 2014, all the Saint books from Enter the Saint to Salvage for the Saint (but not Meet the Tiger nor Burl Barer's Capture the Saint) were republished in both the United Kingdom and United States.

== On radio ==
Several radio drama series were produced in North America, Ireland, and Britain. The earliest was for Radio Éireann's Radio Athlone in 1940 and starred Terence De Marney. Radio Times dated 11 October 1940 refers to "'The Saint' Terence de Marney as the Charteris hero." Both NBC and CBS produced Saint series during 1945, starring Edgar Barrier and Brian Aherne. Many early shows were adaptations of published stories, although Charteris wrote several storylines for the series which were novelised as short stories and novellas.

The longest-running radio incarnation was Vincent Price, who played the character in a series between 1947 and 1951 on three networks: CBS, Mutual and NBC. Like The Whistler, the program had an opening whistle theme with footsteps. Price left in May 1951, to be replaced by Tom Conway, who played the role for several more months; his brother, George Sanders, had played Templar on film. For more about the Saint on American radio, see The Saint (radio program).

The next English-language radio series aired on Springbok Radio in South Africa between 1953 and 1957. These were fresh adaptations of the original stories and starred Tom Meehan. Around 1965 to 1966 the South African version of Lux Radio Theatre produced a single dramatization of The Saint. The English service of South Africa produced another series radio adventures for six months in 1970–1971. The most recent English-language incarnation was a series of three one-hour-long radio plays on BBC Radio 4 in 1995, all adapted from Charteris novels: Saint Overboard, The Saint Closes The Case and The Saint Plays With Fire, starring Paul Rhys as Templar.

== In film ==
Not long after creating The Saint, Charteris began a long association with Hollywood as a screenwriter. He was successful in getting a major studio, RKO Radio Pictures, interested in a film based on one of his works. The first, The Saint in New York in 1938, based on the 1935 novel of the same name, starred Louis Hayward as Templar and Jonathan Hale as Inspector Henry Fernack, the American counterpart of Mr Teal.

The film was a success and RKO began a Saint series. Some of the films were based on Charteris's original novels or novellas; others were original stories based upon outlines by Charteris. Louis Hayward was no longer available, as having signed with independent producer Edward Small. The role of Simon Templar went to George Sanders. Sanders's suave, offhand manner captured the urbane yet daring qualities of the Saint character.

After five films RKO discontinued American production but made two more films in England, using funds that had been frozen by recent British legislation. Actor Hugh Sinclair played Simon Templar in both films, produced in 1941: The Saint's Vacation and The Saint Meets the Tiger. The second film was shelved until 1943, when it was released by Republic Pictures.

In 1943 RKO launched a new series featuring The Falcon. George Sanders again played a debonair adventurer, and "Saint" leading lady Wendy Barrie was on hand as well. The new Falcon pictures followed the "Saint" pattern so closely that author Charteris sued RKO, charging unfair competition. Charteris told author David Zinman in 1971, "RKO switched to The Falcon, a flagrant carbon copy of their version of The Saint, in my opinion with the single mercenary motive of saving the payments they had to make to me for the film rights." Charteris actually makes fun of The Falcon in his 1943 novel The Saint Steps In, with a character referring to the Falcon as "a bargain-basement imitation" of The Saint.

In 1953, British Hammer Film Productions produced The Saint's Return (known as The Saint's Girl Friday in the United States), for which Louis Hayward returned to the role. This was followed by an unsuccessful French production in 1960.

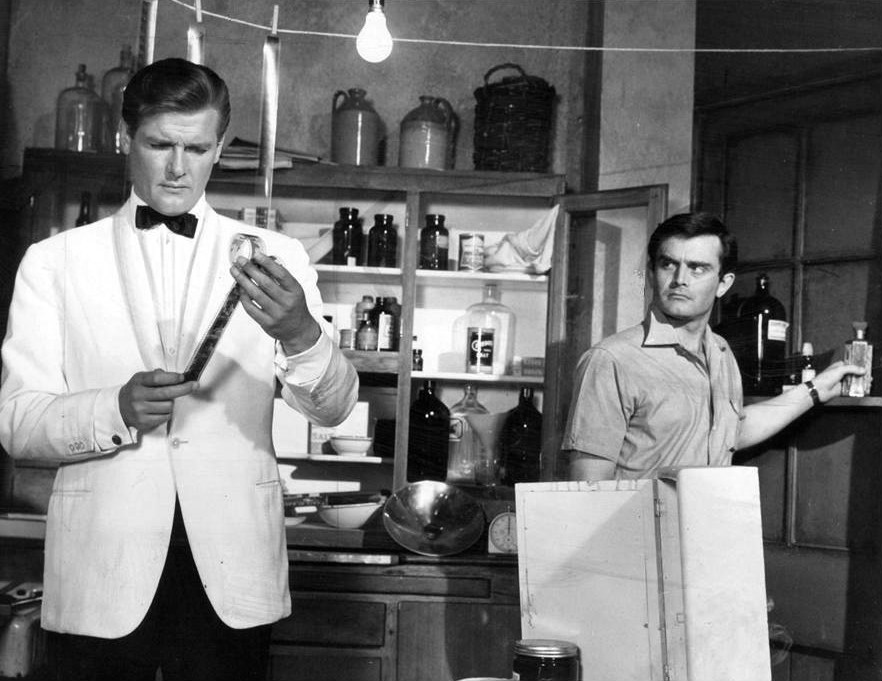
Roger Moore as The Saint

In the mid-1980s, the National Enquirer and other newspapers reported that Roger Moore was planning to produce a movie based on The Saint with Pierce Brosnan as Templar, but it was never made. In 1989, six movies were made by Taffner starring Simon Dutton. These were syndicated in the United States as part of a series of films titled Mystery Wheel of Adventure, while in the United Kingdom they were shown as a series on ITV.

In 1991, as detailed by Burl Barer in his 1992 history of The Saint, plans were announced for a series of motion pictures. Ultimately, however, no such franchise appeared. A feature film The Saint starring Val Kilmer was released in 1997, but it diverged in style from the Charteris books, although it did revive Templar's use of aliases. Kilmer's Saint is unable to defeat a Russian gangster in hand-to-hand combat and is forced to flee; this would have been unthinkable in a Charteris tale. Whereas the original Saint resorted to aliases that had the initials S.T., Kilmer's character used Christian saints, regardless of initials. This Saint refrained from killing, and even his main enemies live to stand trial, whereas Charteris's version had no qualms about taking another life. Kilmer's Saint is presented as a master of disguise, but Charteris's version hardly used the sophisticated ones shown in this film. The film mirrored aspects of Charteris's own life, notably his origins in the Far East, though not in an orphanage as the film portrayed. Roger Moore features throughout in cameo as the BBC Newsreader heard in Simon Templar's Volvo.

In July 2021, Paramount Pictures announced a reboot film, with Regé-Jean Page set to play Templar.

== On television ==
The actor Roger Moore brought Simon Templar to the new medium of television in the series The Saint, which ran from 1962 to 1969, and Moore remains the actor most closely identified with the character. (According to the book Spy Television by Wesley Britton, the first actor offered the role was Patrick McGoohan of Danger Man and The Prisoner.)

Other actors played Templar in later series, notably Return of the Saint (1978–1979) starring Ian Ogilvy; the series ran for one season on CBS and ITV. A television pilot for a series to be called The Saint in Manhattan, starring Australian actor Andrew Clarke, was shown on CBS in 1987 as part of the CBS Summer Playhouse; this pilot was produced by Donald L. Taffner, but it never progressed beyond the pilot stage. Inspector John Fernack of the NYPD, played by Kevin Tighe, made his first film appearance since the 1940s in that production, while Templar (sporting a moustache) got about in a black Lamborghini bearing the ST1 licence plate.

Since the 1997 Val Kilmer film The Saint, there have been several failed attempts at producing pilots for potential new Saint television series. On 13 March 2007, TNT said it was developing a one-hour series to be executive produced by William J. MacDonald and produced by Jorge Zamacona. James Purefoy was announced as the new Simon Templar. Production of the pilot, which was to have been directed by Barry Levinson, did not go ahead. Another attempt at production was planned for 2009 with Scottish actor Dougray Scott starring as Simon Templar. Roger Moore announced on his website that he would be appearing in the new production, which was being produced by his son, Geoffrey Moore, in a small role.

It was announced in December 2012 that a third attempt would be made to produce a pilot for a potential TV series. This time, English actor Adam Rayner was cast as Simon Templar and American actress Eliza Dushku as Patricia Holm (a character from the novels never before portrayed on television and only once in the films), with Roger Moore producing. Unlike the prior attempts, production of the Rayner pilot did commence in December 2012 and continued into early 2013, with Moore and Ogilvy making cameo appearances, according to a cast list posted on the official Leslie Charteris website and subsequently confirmed in the trailer that was released. The pilot was not picked up for a series, but a large amount of additional footage was shot to complete it as the television film The Saint, released on 11 July 2017.

=== Films ===
Since 1938, numerous films have been produced in the United States, France and Australia based to varying degrees upon the Saint. A few were based, usually loosely, upon Charteris's stories, but most were original.

This is a list of the films featuring Simon Templar and of the actors who played the Saint:

- The Saint in New York (1938 – Louis Hayward)
- The Saint Strikes Back (1939 – George Sanders)
- The Saint in London (1939 – Sanders; produced in the UK by RKO's British unit)
- The Saint's Double Trouble (1940 – Sanders)
- The Saint Takes Over (1940 – Sanders)
- The Saint in Palm Springs (1941 – Sanders)
- The Saint's Vacation (1941 – Hugh Sinclair; produced in the UK by RKO)
- The Saint Meets the Tiger (produced in the UK by RKO in 1941, released in 1943 by Republic – Sinclair)
- The Saint's Return (1953 – Hayward) – aka The Saint's Girl Friday
- Le Saint mène la danse (1960 – Félix Marten)
- The Saint Lies in Wait (1966 – Jean Marais)
- The Fiction Makers (1968 – Roger Moore) – edited from episodes of The Saint
- Vendetta for the Saint (1969 – Moore) – edited from episodes of The Saint
- The Saint (1997 – Val Kilmer)

In the 1930s, RKO purchased the rights to produce a film adaptation of Saint Overboard, but no such movie was ever produced.

=== Television films ===
- The Saint and the Brave Goose (1979 made for TV – Ian Ogilvy) – edited from episodes of Return of the Saint
- The Saint in Manhattan (1987 made for TV – Andrew Clarke)
- The Saint – six 100-minute TV films, all starring Simon Dutton. Made for London Weekend Television (LWT) in the United Kingdom, it was postponed due to poor ratings, but went out as part of The Mystery Wheel of Adventure in the United States:
  - The Saint: Wrong Number (21 July 1990, postponed from 14 July 1990 – Simon Dutton)
  - The Saint: The Software Murders (4 August 1990 – Dutton)
  - The Saint: The Brazilian Connection (2 September 1989 – Dutton)
  - The Saint: The Blue Dulac (9 September 1989 – Dutton)
  - The Saint: The Big Bang (28 July 1990 – Dutton)
  - Fear in Fun Park, a.k.a. The Saint in Australia (14 July 1990, postponed from 16 September 1989 & 7 July 1990 – Dutton)
- The Saint (2017 made for TV – Adam Rayner)

=== Television series ===
This list includes only productions that became TV series, and does not include pilots.

- The Saint (1962–1969 – Roger Moore)
- Return of the Saint (1978–1979 – Ian Ogilvy)

=== Note ===
Three of the actors to play Templar—Roger Moore, Ian Ogilvy, and Simon Dutton—have been appointed vice presidents of "The Saint Club" that was founded by Leslie Charteris in 1936.

== On the stage ==
In the late 1940s Charteris and sometime Sherlock Holmes scriptwriter Denis Green wrote a stage play titled The Saint Misbehaves. It was never publicly performed, as soon after writing it Charteris decided to focus on non-Saint work. For many years it was thought to be lost; however, two copies are known to exist in private hands, and correspondence relating to the play can be found in the Leslie Charteris Collection at Boston University.

== In comics ==
The Saint
- Bob Lubbers' The Saint (4 October 1959)
- Author(s): Leslie Charteris; Harry Harrison
- Illustrators: Mike Roy (1948–1951); John Spranger (1951–1959); Bob Lubbers (1959–1960); Doug Wildey (1960–1961)
- Current status/schedule: Concluded Daily & Sunday
- Launch date: 27 September 1948
- End date: 16 September 1961
- Syndicate: New York Herald Tribune Syndicate
- Publisher: Avon Comics
- Genre: Adventure

The Saint debuted in comic books in 1942, being published in issues 18-21 of Lev Gleason's Silver Streak Comics, with scripts by Leslie Charteris himself.

The Saint appeared in a long-running series starting as a daily comic strip 27 September 1948 with a Sunday added on 20 March the following year. The early strips also were written by Leslie Charteris, who had previous experience writing comic strips, having replaced Dashiell Hammett as the writer of the Secret Agent X-9 strip. The original artist was Mike Roy. Between 1949 and 1950, Roy had as an assistant the novice Jack Davis, who did the inking and backgrounds for the strip. In 1951, when John Spranger replaced Roy as the artist, he altered the Saint's appearance by depicting him with a beard. Bob Lubbers illustrated The Saint in 1959 and 1960. Between 1955 and 1960, Harry Harrison served as a ghostwriter for the comic strip. The final two years of the strip were drawn by Doug Wildey before it came to an end on 16 September 1961.

Concurrent with the comic strip, Avon Comics published 12 issues of a The Saint comic book between 1947 and 1952 (some of these stories were reprinted in the 1980s). Some issues included uncredited short text stories; one of these, "Danger No. 5", also appeared as filler in issue 2 of the 1952 war comic Captain Steve Savage.

The 1960s TV series is unusual in that it is one of the few major programs of its genre that was not adapted as a comic book in the United States. It was, however, adapted as a comic strip in the British weekly comic TV Tornado (later merging with TV21), where it ran from 1967 to 1970, drawn by Vicente Alcazar. The strip was titled Meet the Saint in later issues.

In Sweden, a long-running Saint comic book was published from 1966 to 1985 under the title Helgonet. It originally reprinted the newspaper strip, but already in 1969 original stories were commissioned for Helgonet. These stories were also later reprinted in other European countries. About 170 stories were produced from 1969 to 1991 (after 1985, the stories were published in the Swedish James Bond comic book). Two of the main writers were Norman Worker and Donne Avenell; the latter also co-wrote the novels The Saint and the Templar Treasure and the novella collection Count on the Saint, while Worker contributed to the novella collection Catch the Saint.

A new American comic book series was launched by Moonstone in the summer of 2012, but it never went beyond a single promotional issue "zero".

One of the final issues of The Saint Magazine from 1967 featured reprints of the Saint stories "The Export Trade" and "The Five Thousand Pound Kiss", as well as a novella by Michael Avallone, here erroneously credited as the creator of The Man from U.N.C.L.E.

== In magazines ==
The original Saint novellas first appeared in The Thriller (1929–1940), edited by Monty Hayden, a friend of the author, who was sometimes given a thinly disguised role in the early stories. Charteris also edited or oversaw several magazines that tied in with the Saint. The first of these were anthologies titled The Saint's Choice that ran for seven issues in 1945–46. A few years later Charteris launched The Saint Detective Magazine (later titled The Saint Mystery Magazine and The Saint Magazine), which ran for 141 issues between 1953 and 1967, with a separate British edition that ran just as long but published different material. In most issues of Saint's Choice and the later magazines Charteris included at least one Saint story, usually previously published in one of his books but occasionally original. In several mid-1960s issues, however, he substituted Instead of the Saint, a series of essays on topics of interest to him. The rest of the material in the magazines consisted of novellas and short stories by other mystery writers of the day. An Australian edition was also published for a few years in the 1950s. In 1984 Charteris attempted to revive the Saint magazine, but it ran for only three issues.

Leslie Charteris himself portrayed The Saint in The Saint Goes West, a photo play in an issue of Life magazine published on 19 May 1941. Other performers in the piece were Morgan Conway, Lucia Carroll and Marjorie Woodworth.

== Book series ==
Most Saint books were collections of novellas or short stories, some of which were published individually either in magazines or in smaller paperback form. Many of the books have also been published under different titles over the years; the titles used here are the more common ones for each book.

From 1964 to 1983, the Saint books were collaborative works; Charteris acted in an editorial capacity and received front cover author credit, while other authors wrote these stories and were credited inside the book. These collaborative authors are noted. (Sources: Barer and the editions themselves.)

Year	First publication title (and author if not Charteris)	Stories	Alternative titles
1928	Meet the Tiger	novel	Meet – the Tiger! The Saint Meets the Tiger; Scoundrels Ltd. Crooked Gold; The Saint in Danger
1930	Enter the Saint	"The Man Who was Clever" "The Policeman with Wings" "The Lawless Lady" (Some editions contain only two stories, in different combinations)	none
1930	The Last Hero	novel	The Creeping Death; Sudden Death; The Saint Closes the Case; The Saint and the Last Hero
1930	Knight Templar	novel	The Avenging Saint
1931	Featuring the Saint (originally published UK only)	"The Logical Adventure" "The Wonderful War" "The Man Who Could Not Die"	none
1931	Alias the Saint (originally published UK only)	"Story of a Dead Man" "The Impossible Crime" "The National Debt"; Avon paperback contains only "The National Debt" and "The Man Who Could Not Die" from the previous book.	none
1931	Wanted for Murder (US only)	US-only edition combining Featuring the Saint and Alias the Saint (only US edition of these books until the 1960s); Avon paperback has only "The Story of a Dead Man" and "The Impossible Crime" from the previous book.	Paging the Saint
1931	She Was a Lady	novel	The Saint Meets His Match; Angels of Doom
1932	The Holy Terror	"The Inland Revenue" "The Million Pound Day" "The Melancholy Journey of Mr. Teal"	The Saint Vs. Scotland Yard
1932	Getaway	novel	The Saint's Getaway; Property of the Deceased; Two Men from Munich
1933	Once More the Saint	"The Gold Standard" "The Man from St. Louis" "The Death Penalty"	The Saint and Mr. Teal
1933	The Brighter Buccaneer	"The Brain Workers" "The Export Trade" "The Tough Egg" "The Bad Baron" "The Brass Buddha" "The Perfect Crime" "The Unpopular Landlord" "The New Swindle" "The Five Thousand Pound Kiss" "The Blind Spot" "The Unusual Ending" "The Unblemished Bootlegger" "The Appalling Politician" "The Owner's Handicap" "The Green Goods Man"	none
1934	The Misfortunes of Mr. Teal	"The Simon Templar Foundation" "The Higher Finance" "The Art of Alibi"	The Saint in London; The Saint in England
1934	Boodle	"The Ingenious Colonel" "The Unfortunate Financier" "The Newdick Helicopter" "The Prince of Cherkessia" "The Treasure of Turk's Lane" "The Sleepless Knight" "The Uncritical Publisher" "The Noble Sportsman" "The Damsel in Distress" "The Loving Brothers" "The Tall Timber" "The Art Photographer" "The Man Who Liked Toys" "The Mixture as Before" (some editions omit the stories "The Uncritical Publisher" and "The Noble Sportsman")	The Saint Intervenes
1934	The Saint Goes On	"The High Fence" "The Elusive Ellshaw" "The Case of the Frightened Innkeeper"	none
1935	The Saint in New York	novel	none
1936	Saint Overboard	novel	The Pirate Saint; The Saint Overboard
1937	The Ace of Knaves	"The Spanish War" "The Unlicensed Victuallers" "The Beauty Specialist"	The Saint in Action
1937	Thieves' Picnic	novel	The Saint Bids Diamonds
1938	Prelude for War	novel	The Saint Plays with Fire; The Saint and the Sinners
1938	Follow the Saint	"The Miracle Tea Party" "The Invisible Millionaire" "The Affair of Hogsbotham"	none
1939	The Happy Highwayman	"The Man Who was Lucky" "The Smart Detective" "The Wicked Cousin" "The Well-Meaning Mayor" "The Benevolent Burglary" "The Star Producers" "The Charitable Countess" "The Mug's Game" "The Man Who Liked Ants" (some editions omit the stories "The Charitable Countess" and "The Mug's Game"; story order also varies between editions)	none
1940	The Saint in Miami	novel	none
1942	The Saint Goes West	"Arizona" "Palm Springs" "Hollywood" (Some editions omit "Arizona")	none
1942	The Saint Steps In	novel	none
1944	The Saint on Guard	"The Black Market" "The Sizzling Saboteur" (Some editions omit the second story, which is often published on its own)	The Saint and the Sizzling Saboteur (single story reprint)
1946	The Saint Sees it Through	novel	none
1948	Call for the Saint	"The King of the Beggars" "The Masked Angel"	none
1948	Saint Errant	"Judith: The Naughty Niece" "Iris: The Old Routine" "Lida: The Foolish Frail" "Jeannine: The Lovely Sinner" "Lucia: The Homecoming of Amadeo Urselli" "Teresa: The Uncertain Widow" "Luella: The Saint and the Double Badger" "Emily: The Doodlebug" "Dawn: The Darker Drink"	none
1953	The Saint in Europe	"Paris: The Covetous Headsman" "Amsterdam: The Angel's Eye" "The Rhine: The Rhine Maiden" "Tirol: The Golden Journey" "Lucerne: The Loaded Tourist" "Juan-les-Pins: The Spanish Cow" "Rome: The Latin Touch"	none
1955	The Saint on the Spanish Main	"Bimini: The Effete Angler" "Nassau: The Arrow of God" "Jamaica: The Black Commissar" "Puerto Rico: The Unkind Philanthropist" "Virgin Islands: The Old Treasure Story" "Haiti: The Questing Tycoon" (some editions contain only 4 stories)	none
1956	The Saint Around the World	"Bermuda: The Patient Playboy" "England: The Talented Husband" "France: The Reluctant Nudist" "Middle East: The Lovelorn Sheik" "Malaya: The Pluperfect Lady" "Vancouver: The Sporting Chance"	none
1957	Thanks to the Saint	"The Bunco Artists" "The Happy Suicide" "The Good Medicine" "The Unescapable Word" "The Perfect Sucker" "The Careful Terrorist"	none
1958	Señor Saint	"The Pearls of Peace" "The Revolution Racket" "The Romantic Matron" "The Golden Frog"	none
1959	The Saint to the Rescue	"The Ever-Loving Spouse" "The Fruitful Land" "The Percentage Player" "The Water Merchant" "The Gentle Ladies" "The Element of Doubt"	none
1962	Trust the Saint	"The Helpful Pirate" "The Bigger Game" "The Cleaner Cure" "The Intemperate Reformer" "The Uncured Ham" "The Convenient Monster"	none
1963	The Saint in the Sun	"Cannes: The Better Mousetrap" "St. Tropez: The Ugly Impresario" "England: The Prodigal Miser" "Nassau: The Fast Women" "Florida: The Jolly Undertaker" "Lucerne: The Russian Prisoner" "Provence: The Hopeless Heiress"	none
1964	Vendetta for the Saint (Harry Harrison, Leslie Charteris)	novel	none
1968	The Saint on TV (Fleming Lee, John Kruse)	"The Death Game" "The Power Artist" (novelisation of TV scripts)	none
1968	The Saint Returns (Fleming Lee, John Kruse, D.R. Motton, Leigh Vance)	"The Dizzy Daughter" "The Gadget Lovers" (novelisation of TV scripts)	none
1968	The Saint and the Fiction Makers (Fleming Lee, John Kruse)	novelisation of TV script	none
1969	The Saint Abroad (Fleming Lee, Michael Pertwee)	"The Art Collectors" "The Persistent Patriots" (novelisation of TV scripts)	none
1970	The Saint in Pursuit (Fleming Lee, Leslie Charteris)	novelization of comic strip	none
1971	The Saint and the People Importers (Fleming Lee, Leslie Charteris)	novelisation of TV script	none
1975	Catch the Saint (Fleming Lee, Norman Worker)	"The Masterpiece Merchant" "The Adoring Socialite"	none
1976	The Saint and the Hapsburg Necklace (Christopher Short)	novel	none
1977	Send for the Saint (Peter Bloxsom, John Kruse, Donald James)	"The Midas Double" "The Pawn Gambit" (novelisation of TV scripts)	none
1978	The Saint in Trouble (Graham Weaver, John Kruse, Terence Feely)	"The Imprudent Professor" (Return of the Saint episode novelisation) "The Red Sabbath"	none
1979	The Saint and the Templar Treasure (Graham Weaver, Donne Avenell)	novel	none
1980	Count on the Saint (Graham Weaver, Donne Avenell)	"The Pastors' Problem" "The Unsaintly Santa"	none
1983	Salvage for the Saint (Peter Bloxsom, John Kruse)	novel (Return of the Saint episode novelisation)	none
1997	The Saint (Burl Barer, Jonathan Hensleigh, Wesley Strick)	film novelization	none
1997	Capture the Saint (Burl Barer)	novel	none

=== Omnibus editions ===
Year	First publication title	Stories	From
1939	The First Saint Omnibus	The Man Who was Clever; The Wonderful War; The Story of a Dead Man; The Unblemished Bootlegger; The Appalling Politician; The Million Pound Day; The Death Penalty; The Simon Templar Foundation; The Unfortunate Financier; The Sleepless Knight; The High Fence; The Unlicensed Victuallers; The Affair of Hogsbotham	Enter the Saint; Featuring the Saint; Alias the Saint; The Brighter Buccaneer; The Brighter Buccaneer; The Holy Terror; Once More the Saint; The Misfortunes of Mr Teal; Boodle; Boodle; The Saint Goes On; The Ace of Knaves; Follow the Saint
1952	The Second Saint Omnibus	The Star Producers; The Wicked Cousin; The Man Who Liked Ants; Palm Springs; The Sizzling Saboteur; The Masked Angel; Judith; Jeannine; Teresa; Dawn	The Happy Highwayman; The Happy Highwayman; The Happy Highwayman; The Saint Goes West; The Saint on Guard; Call For the Saint; Saint Errant; Saint Errant; Saint Errant; Saint Errant

In addition to the above, numerous paperback omnibuses compiling short stories and novellas have been published. Examples include Arrest the Saint (Avon, 1951), Concerning the Saint (Avon, 1958) and The Saint Cleans Up (Avon, 1959). In 1983, Avenel Books published the hardcover omnibus The Saint: Five Complete Novels, though this was actually three novellas and two full-length novels, combining the books Enter the Saint, The Holy Terror (a.k.a. The Saint vs. Scotland Yard), The Last Hero (a.k.a. The Saint Closes the Case) and Knight Templar (a.k.a. The Avenging Saint).

=== French adventures ===
A number of Saint adventures were published in French over a 30-year period, most of which have yet to be published in English. Many of these stories were ghostwritten by Madeleine Michel-Tyl and credited to Charteris (who exercised some editorial control). The French books were generally novelisations of scripts from the radio series, or novels adapted from stories in the American Saint comic strip. One of the writers who worked on the French series, Fleming Lee, later wrote for the English-language books.

=== Unpublished works ===
Burl Barer's history of the Saint identifies two manuscripts that to date have not been published. The first is a collaboration between Charteris and Fleming Lee called Bet on the Saint that was rejected by Doubleday, the American publishers of the Saint series. Charteris, Barer writes, chose not to submit it to his United Kingdom publishers, Hodder & Stoughton. The rejection of the manuscript by Doubleday meant that The Crime Club's long-standing right of first refusal on any new Saint works was now ended and the manuscript was then submitted to other United States publishers, without success. Barer also tells of a 1979 novel titled The Saint's Lady by a Scottish fan, Joy Martin, which had been written as a present for and as a tribute to Charteris. Charteris was impressed by the manuscript and attempted to get it published, but it too was ultimately rejected. The manuscript, which according to Barer is in the archives of Boston University, features the return of Patricia Holm.

According to the Saintly Bible website, at one time Leslie Charteris biographer Ian Dickerson was working on a manuscript (based upon a film story idea by Charteris) for a new novel titled Son of the Saint in which Templar shares an adventure with his son by Patricia Holm. The book has, to date, not been published.

A fourth unpublished manuscript, this time written by Charteris himself, titled The Saint's Second Front was written during the Second World War but was rejected at the time; believed lost for decades, it emerged at an auction in 2017.

== In popular culture ==
In 1980 English punk band Splodgenessabounds released a single "Simon Templer" (misspelling intentional). It reached number 7 in the UK charts. The song appears mocking of the TV character, concluding "I think Simon's a bit of a bore/Ian Ogilvy and Podgy Moore."

In 1962 students from James Cook University, Townsville, Australia abseiled down the pink granite monolith, Castle Hill and painted the character on its side as an act of patriotism, as the university had adopted the character as their mascot. At first, the local council (and some of the public) considered this vandalism and removed it, only for the students to keep repainting it. The council eventually gave up, and The Saint has been a permanent fixture since the 1970s. The irony now is that Queensland State Legislation states that objects older than 30 years old are eligible for cultural heritage status. This means that The Saint, originally a piece of graffiti, is now a Townsville Cultural Heritage icon.
