= The Saint to the Rescue =

- First UK edition
- Author: Leslie Charteris
- Language: English
- Series: The Saint
- Genre: Mystery fiction
- Publisher: The Crime Club
- Publication date: 1959 (US) 1961 (UK)
- Publication place: United Kingdom
- Media type: Print (hardback & paperback)
- Preceded by: Señor Saint
- Followed by: Trust the Saint

The Saint to the Rescue is a collection of short stories by Leslie Charteris, first published in 1959 by The Crime Club in the United States. The first British edition by Hodder and Stoughton was not published until 1961. This was the 34th book to feature the adventures of Simon Templar, alias "The Saint".

== Stories ==
The book consisted of 6 stories:

1. "The Ever-Loving Spouse"
2. "The Fruitful Land"
3. "The Percentage Player"
4. "The Water Merchant"
5. "The Gentle Ladies"
6. "The Element of Doubt"

== Television adaptations ==
Three of the stories from this collection formed the basis for episodes of the 1962-69 TV series, The Saint.

"Element of Doubt" aired on 22 November 1962 during the first season. During the second season, "The Gentle Ladies" and "The Ever-Loving Spouse" aired back-to-back on 5 and 12 March 1964.
