= The Happy Highwayman =

1939 book by Leslie Charteris

- First edition (UK)
- Author: Leslie Charteris
- Language: English
- Series: The Saint
- Genre: Mystery, Short Stories
- Publisher: Hodder and Stoughton (UK); The Crime Club (US)
- Publication date: 1939
- Publication place: United Kingdom
- Media type: Print (hardback & paperback)
- Preceded by: Follow the Saint
- Followed by: The Saint in Miami

The Happy Highwayman is a collection of short stories by Leslie Charteris, first published in 1939 by Hodder and Stoughton in the United Kingdom and The Crime Club in the United States. This was the 21st book to feature the adventures of Simon Templar, alias "The Saint". The 1963 Hodder and Stoughton paperback edition erroneously gives 1933 as the book's original publishing date, as does the 1958 Pan Books paperback.

This was the last set of Saint short stories until the publication of Saint Errant nine years later. It is also the first Saint book since Thieves' Picnic in which Templar's girlfriend and partner, Patricia Holm, does not appear. Also absent is Hoppy Uniatz, Templar's sidekick. However, the story "The Charitable Countess" does include the return of Inspector Fernack, last seen in 1935's The Saint in New York.

In his introduction to the 1963 Fiction Publishing Corporation edition of 1930s Enter the Saint, Charteris writes that he had no intention of updating his early stories as they were republished, preferring them to remain as period pieces. When Hodder & Stoughton republished The Happy Highwayman in 1963, however, some updates were done to parts of the texts. This is most noticeable in the story "The Star Producers". When originally published in 1939, several major stars of the day were referenced, specifically William Powell, John Barrymore and Greta Garbo. For the 1963 edition, these names were replaced with 1960s stars William Holden, Marlon Brando, and Brigitte Bardot, respectively. (However, a reference to Charles Laughton is left unaltered.) Another story, "The Man Who Was Lucky", makes reference to the Atomic Age in the 1963 edition, a term not in use when it was first published in 1939.

The Happy Highwayman collection marked the end of an era in the Saint series. Beginning with the next book, The Saint in Miami, Charteris relocated Templar to the United States where most of the 1940s adventures would take place; afterwards, Templar's adventures became more international in scope. The Happy Highwayman, as a result, was the last Saint book for many years to be primarily set in Great Britain. In addition, beginning with The Saint in Miami Templar's adventures became primarily World War II-focused. Aside from a few subtle references, the character of Claud Eustace Teal disappears from the series after this book, not to return until an appearance in the 1956 short story collection The Saint Around the World, though a few off-the-cuff references will be made to him in the interim.

The next Saint book to be primarily set outside the US would be The Saint in Europe, published in 1953.

== Stories ==
The book consisted of 9 stories (the order varies between editions):

1. The Man Who Was Lucky - The Saint steps in to save the life of a murder witness who is marked for death by a gangster. Serialised in Woman's Journal July 1938 as "Stranger Things Have Happened".
2. The Smart Detective - upon returning to England from a trip abroad, The Saint becomes interested in a stash of emeralds owned by a sweat shop owner, not realizing an ambitious Scotland Yard detective is watching his every move. Serialised in Woman's Journal May 1938 as "A Matter of Seconds".
3. The Wicked Cousin - when Simon discovers an old friend has been unfairly treated by a will, he sets out to make things right.
4. The Well-Meaning Mayor - during a visit to the seaside town of Elmford, Simon avenges the suicide of a police commissioner by going after the corrupt civic leader responsible. Serialised in Woman's Journal June 1938 as "Saint's Day".
5. The Benevolent Burglary - Templar makes a bet with a mean-spirited art dealer that his collection will be stolen within a week of a gala opening, which sets Scotland Yard Chief Inspector Claud Eustace Teal after the Saint in order to prevent the crime.
6. The Star Producers - after a young woman loses $4,000 in a fake acting school scam, Templar decides to enrol.
7. The Charitable Countess - Simon engages in a battle of wits with a less-than-charitable society figure.
8. The Mug's Game - with the aid of a pair of trick glasses, Templar turns the tables on a pair of poker cheats.
9. The Man Who Liked Ants - Charteris takes The Saint into science fiction territory when he meets a scientist who has bred giant-sized ants in order to replace humans as the dominant species.

Some editions of this book omit the stories "The Charitable Countess" and "The Mug's Game".

== Television adaptations ==
All but three of the stories from this collection formed the basis for episodes of the 1962-69 TV series, The Saint.

"The Man Who Was Lucky" and "The Charitable Countess" were both adapted during the show's first season, on 13 and 20 December 1962 respectively. "The Well-Meaning Mayor" and "The Benevolent Burglary" aired during the second season on 5 and 26 December 1963 respectively. "The Smart Detective" was adapted during The Saint's abbreviated fourth season on 22 July 1965. "The Man Who Liked Ants" was adapted as "The House on Dragon's Rock", which aired on 24 November 1968 as an episode of the sixth season.
