= Patricia Holm =

Fictional character

- The Saint character
- Patricia Holm, as depicted on the cover of a 1980s reprint of Meet – The Tiger!
- First appearance: Meet - The Tiger! (1928)
- Last appearance: Saint Errant (1948)
- Created by: Leslie Charteris
- Portrayed by: Jean Gillie (1943); Louise Arthur (radio series); Kim Thomson (BBC radio); Eliza Dushku (2012)
- Voiced by: Kim Thomson

In-universe information
- Gender: Female
- Occupation: Detective
- Nationality: British

Patricia Holm is the name of a fictional character who appeared in the novels and short stories of Leslie Charteris between 1928 and 1948. She was the on-again, off-again girlfriend and partner of Simon Templar, alias "The Saint", and shared a number of his adventures. In addition, by the mid-1930s, Holm and Templar shared the same flat in London, although they were unmarried. Although such co-habitation between unmarried partners is commonplace today, it was rare, shocking (and in some areas, even illegal) in the 1930s. The two also appeared to have a somewhat "open" relationship, with Holm accepting (or, at least, tolerating) Templar's occasional dalliances with other women.

Charteris wrote Holm out of the series after 1948. A fleeting reference in the final novel credited to Charteris (1983's Salvage for the Saint) reveals that at some point in the past, Holm had left Templar.

== Early appearances ==
Holm is 20 when she first encounters Templar in the inaugural Saint adventure Meet - The Tiger! (published in 1928). She and Templar encounter each other on the street in a quiet seaside English village, and she is initially annoyed by his flippant, almost comical behavior. Later, following more encounters, she begins to fall in love with Templar and literally talks herself into assisting the Saint on a scheme to uncover the identity of a crime boss named The Tiger and make off with a hoard of illegally obtained gold. Templar, after some initial hesitancy, recognizes Holm as a kindred spirit, with "Saintly" qualities not unlike his own.

Holm actually becomes the main protagonist for the middle third of the novel, as at one point the Saint is incapacitated and Holm is led to the assumption that he is dead. She decides to complete his mission and take revenge upon the Tiger, but is reunited with Templar before things get out of hand.

Charteris' physical description of Holm (which remained consistent) is of a tall and willowy woman with long, golden-blonde hair.

Following Meet - The Tiger!, Holm fades into the background for the next Saint book, 1930s Enter the Saint (a novella collection), and is relegated to cameo status, the character being sent on a Mediterranean cruise, ostensibly to keep her out of trouble. In the third Saint book, the novel The Last Hero, Holm alternates between being an active heroine (she and Templar witness a test of the electroncloud device, a machine that has the potential to spark a second world war) to "damsel in distress" as she is kidnapped by the villain, millionaire Rayt Marius, an action that sends the Saint into a murderous rage. In the same book, the reader - but not Holm herself - learns that Templar's friend Norman Kent is deeply and hopelessly in love with her, a futile love which has a significant part in bringing Kent to decide upon the self-sacrificing act which he takes at the book's conclusion.

After The Last Hero, Holm all but vanishes from the series for a time. She is only briefly mentioned in Knight Templar, a direct sequel to The Last Hero (Charteris writes that she's on another Mediterranean cruise), and appears only briefly in the next two novella collections Featuring the Saint and Alias the Saint (initially released in the United States as the omnibus Wanted for Murder). She is completely absent from the following novel, She Was a Lady, however her presence is felt as Templar, despite finding himself in partnership with a beautiful crime boss for a number of weeks, states that his heart belongs to another and that his relationship with Jill Trelawney is nothing beyond platonic.

== Relationship with the Saint ==
Beginning in the next book, 1932's The Holy Terror, Charteris returns to using Patricia Holm in the same way in which she made her debut in Meet - The Tiger! - as a willing and loyal partner to The Saint, who is willing to do almost anything (within reason) to help Templar achieve his goals. Templar reaffirms his love for Holm several times in The Holy Terror, even going so far as to considering proposing marriage, but Holm replies that she has no interest in marrying, fearing it would spoil her unique relationship with Templar.

Considering that these early adventures were written in the late 1920s and early 1930s, the relationship shared between Holm and Templar was progressive for its day. In Meet - The Tiger! they make love not long after their first meeting, and in Enter the Saint it is suggested they may be living together; by the time of The Holy Terror there is no ambiguity at all that they share the same flat in London, an extremely rare event in the era. The two also appeared to have a somewhat "open" relationship, with Holm accepting (or, at least, tolerating) Templar's occasional dalliances with other women. For example, in the short story "The Bad Baron" (in the collection The Brighter Buccaneer), Templar briefly goes off with another woman (and steals a kiss from her); Holm's response is to simply ask if Templar has started a new romance; in Prelude for War, in which Holm plays a major supporting role, Holm refers to Lady Valerie (the lead female character in the book who Templar briefly woos) as the latest addition to Simon's harem.

The novel Getaway sees Templar and Holm taking a European vacation, although they soon find themselves battling Prince Rudolf, who had been the power broker behind Rayt Marius in The Last Hero. At one point, Holm and another colleague, Monty Hayward, are left to fend for themselves and Holm reveals that Templar has been training her in the ways of crimefighting, and she takes charge of the situation from Monty. Holm dons several disguises during this adventure, and at the end of the book safely escapes a police station shootout with Templar. Soon after (in the novella "The Gold Standard" in Once More the Saint), she and Templar return to London by separate ways. Templar is apprehended for questioning by Scotland Yard Inspector Claud Eustace Teal; while Templar is in custody Teal receives word that a petty crook has himself been robbed at gunpoint in another part of England. The robber left behind a copy of Templar's trademark stick figure-with halo calling card. Templar claims that someone is impersonating him, a charge Teal initially believes; later, the reader learns that this second "Saint" was in fact Patricia Holm, who committed the act in order to provide Templar with a handy alibi (that an impersonator is responsible for the crimes attributed to him).

== Later career ==
Holm's interests and involvement outside of Templar's inner circle are rarely touched upon. In "The Gold Standard" she is shown attending a party thrown by some friends, but her thoughts remain with Templar throughout and she is described as carrying a gun in a holster under her left arm. In "The Simon Templar Foundation" (a novella in The Misfortunes of Mr. Teal), Charteris describes her as having the same look in her eyes as Templar has (i.e. the look of someone converted to a cause) but her attempt at emulating Templar in that story (trying to divert Teal's attention away from discovering a piece of anti-Saint evidence) is unsuccessful. On a couple of occasions in the short story collection Boodle (a.k.a. The Saint Intervenes) Holm goes undercover as a secretary in order to help move Templar's plots along; in one of these stories, "The Loving Brothers", Holm adopts Templar's physical mannerisms and even mode of speech as she play-acts the role of a fired secretary.

Although she is reduced to a one-line cameo in what is arguably the most famous Saint novel, The Saint in New York, her presence is still felt at a crucial point in the book where Templar is tempted to fall in love with the troubled Fay Edwards. Instead, Charteris writes, Templar remembers that his heart belongs to someone else. (This doesn't stop him from kissing the woman several times, however.) In the very next novel, however, Saint Overboard, not only is Holm conspicuous by her total absence, but Templar explicitly falls in love with Loretta Page, the heroine of the book. By the next book, The Ace of Knaves, Templar is once again back with Holm and no reference to Page is made. Holm is absent once again from the next book, Thieves' Picnic and Templar briefly woos another heroine, but the following novel, Prelude for War places Holm back at the forefront again, described by Charteris as the one constant in Templar's life. She is nowhere to be found in 1939's short story collection The Happy Highwayman which sees Templar romancing several different women. The next book in the series, 1940s The Saint in Miami, makes Holm the instigator of the book's plot, but she otherwise spends much of the novel either "off-screen" or captured by the villains, awaiting Templar's rescue; meanwhile Templar romances a female British secret agent, with hardly a complaint from Holm. Holm subsequently disappears from the series for a number of years, being absent from the next few books, all of which were set in the United States.

== Leaves the series ==
Following an appearance in The Saint in Miami (1940), Holm was absent from the Saint stories until the 1948 novella "The Masked Angel", published as part of Call for the Saint. Later in 1948, the character finally disappeared from the series for good following the short story collection Saint Errant (her final appearance, in order of publishing chronology, being in the story titled "Luella"), and Charteris declined later suggestions for her to return. Nonetheless, according to The Saint: A Complete History in Print, Radio, Film and Television 1928-1992 by Burl Barer, Charteris did attempt to get a fan-written novel entitled The Saint's Lady published as part of the official series in the late 1970s; the book featured Holm. The Saintly Bible website also tells of a plan for a film script entitled Son of the Saint that would have revealed that Holm had a child by Templar. This close relationship could, of course, explain the distance which is always kept between Templar and Pat Holm – if they were close it would be easy for many of the Saint's enemies to revenge themselves on her or her child, something which nearly happened early in Templar's career in The Last Hero.

Ultimately a brief reference to Holm was included in the final Saint novel published under Charteris' tenure, Salvage for the Saint, revealing that at some point in the past, Holm had left Templar.

Charteris' depiction of Holm was fairly consistent, though the character herself could vary wildly in her mood and attitudes. Although often seen as wide eyed and innocent, she is anything but, and is more than willing to kill in order to protect herself or Templar, although in The Holy Terror even Templar momentarily questions her sanity when she expresses disappointment that she didn't get to kill a villain. Charteris often describes her as being cold and dispassionate in her reactions to things and her interactions with others, but at other times she uses affectionate terms like "lad" and "boy" when referring to Templar. The banter between the two frequently resembles that later seen between John Steed and Emma Peel in the television series The Avengers. Holm doesn't blindly follow Templar's every whim, however. She is often described as being exasperated by Templar's tendency to be oblique in his discussion of a situation as well as his obsession with writing poetry; in Once More the Saint she also criticizes Templar for his blackmailing of Inspector Teal in The Holy Terror, and on occasion (such as in "The Gold Standard") questions Templar's tendency to act as judge, jury and executioner.

== In other media ==
Film The character of Patricia Holm was first portrayed on screen by Jean Gillie in a 1943 film adaptation of Meet – The Tiger! entitled The Saint Meets the Tiger, produced by RKO Radio Pictures. Subsequently, in all other film and TV adaptations of stories in which Holm originally appeared, the character name has been changed, until December 2012, when American actress Eliza Dushku stepped into the role for a backdoor pilot produced by Roger Moore and shot under the direction of Simon West. The subsequent pilot, which recast Holm as a high-tech and deadly thief, was not picked up as a series and was eventually released in 2017 (digitally and direct-to-video) in tribute to the recently deceased Moore.

Radio Louise Arthur voiced Patricia in the 1940s radio program, while Kim Thomson played her in a series of adaptations broadcast on BBC Radio 4 in the 1990s.

Comics The character also appeared in the Saint comic strip of the 1940s, although according to Barer the comic strip version of the character barely resembled that of the books. (Barer points out that a comparison between the literary and comic strip versions of Holm can be found in the short story collection Saint Errant which featured "two Patricias" – one story featured a character consistent with her previous book and story appearances, while another story was adapted from the comic strip and shows the other version of Patricia.)
