= The Saint (radio program) =

1945-1951 radio adventure program

- Vincent Price performing as Simon Templar
- Genre: Adventure; Crime; Mystery
- Running time: 30 minutes
- Country of origin: United States
- Language: English
- Syndicates: NBC; CBS; Mutual
- Starring: Edgar Barrier; Brian Aherne; Vincent Price; Tom Conway; Barry Sullivan
- Announcer: Merrill Ross; Don Stanley; Carlton KaDell; Dick Joy
- Created by: Leslie Charteris
- Written by: Louis Vittes; Dick Powell
- Directed by: Helen Mack; Thomas A. McAvity; Bill Rousseau
- Produced by: William N. Robson; James L. Saphier; Leslie Charteris
- Original release: January 4, 1945 – October 14, 1951
- Sponsored by: Bromo-Seltzer; Campbell Soups; Ford Motor Company

The Saint was a radio adventure program in the United States that featured a character ("a swashbuckling, devil-may-care Robin Hood type who, in his attempt to help people, remained just one step ahead of the police and crooks—both of whom he combatted") created by author Leslie Charteris. As the program's introduction said, The Saint (the alias of Simon Templar), was "known to millions from books, magazines, and motion pictures." Several versions of the program appeared on different networks.

== Broadcast history ==
The Saint began its life on radio in January 1945. Most old time radio reference books list the initial broadcast date as January 6, 1945, probably because that was when the program aired in the Eastern United States. In an initial story about The Saint, however, Billboard reported, "Series tees-off over NBC January 4 on 7 Western stations, with a repeat skedded [sic] for Saturday to hit 15 Midwestern and Eastern stations at 7:30 p.m. EWT." That Saturday was January 6. The article noted the involvement of the character's creator, saying: "All scripting will be under the supervision of Charteris, who will oversee the adaptations of his published works. If any originals are to be done, he'll do them." Edgar Barrier starred, and Bromo-Seltzer was the sponsor. This version ended March 31, 1945.

The second iteration of The Saint on radio was a summer replacement for The Jack Carson Show on CBS. It began June 20, 1945, with Billboard reporting in a preview article, "There's nothing definite now, but it's expected here that if The Saint pulls an acceptable Hooperating for its 13-week spin, starting June 20, it may stay on the air permanently with Carson out ..." Despite that prediction, the program went off when its summer run ended September 12, 1945. Brian Aherne starred, and Campbell Soups was the sponsor.

The show's third version, which began July 9, 1947, was limited to CBS' West Coast network. It ended June 30, 1948. The sponsor was Lever Brothers. Vincent Price starred in this version and in most of the show's episodes in the two versions that followed.

After a year's hiatus, The Saint returned to radio July 10, 1949—this time on Mutual. An announcement in Billboard noted that the program would be sustaining (without a sponsor), but that Mutual "will use trial summer run to showcase show for fall bankrolling." The bankrolling eventually came from Ford Motor Company, and the show lasted through May 28, 1950.

The program's final run began June 11, 1950, as a summer replacement for The Phil Harris-Alice Faye Show. The Saint was back on its original network, NBC, for this version, which ended October 14, 1951. The show lasted longer in this version than in any other, despite a negative review of the first episode in Billboard which said much of the script was "confusing and slow-paced" and called star Vincent Price "frightfully dull."

The title role was also played briefly by Tom Conway (whose brother, George Sanders, had played Simon Templar in five films), and Barry Sullivan. Louise Arthur played Patricia Holm, Templar's assistant. Lawrence Dobkin played Louie, the cab driver, and played Templar himself in one episode ("The Fish Case") when Conway was unavailable. John Brown played Inspector Fernack, and Ken Christy played Hoppy, Templar's sidekick.

== Other adaptations ==
The earliest known radio version was broadcast in Ireland on Radio Éireann in 1940, in six episodes starring Terence De Marney.

In 1995, a British adaptation was broadcast on BBC Radio 4, starring Paul Rhys, Fiona Fullerton and Kim Thomson.

== See also ==
- The Saint (TV series)
