= The Saint in Palm Springs =

1941 film by Jack Hively

- Theatrical release poster
- Directed by: Jack Hively
- Screenplay by: Jerry Cady
- Story by: Leslie Charteris
- Produced by: Howard Benedict
- Starring: George Sanders; Wendy Barrie; Jonathan Hale
- Cinematography: Harry J. Wild
- Edited by: George Hively
- Music by: Roy Webb
- Production company: RKO Radio Pictures
- Distributed by: RKO Radio Pictures
- Release date: January 24, 1941
- Running time: 66 minutes
- Country: United States
- Language: English

The Saint in Palm Springs is a 1941 American mystery crime film directed by Jack Hively and starring George Sanders, Wendy Barrie and Jonathan Hale. It was produced and released by Hollywood studio RKO Pictures. The film continued the screen adventures of the Robin Hood-inspired anti-hero, Simon Templar, alias "The Saint", created by Leslie Charteris. This sequel was based upon a story by Charteris; however, many changes to his concept were made. Charteris later novelised his version of the film story as the novella "Palm Springs", contained within the 1942 collection The Saint Goes West. This was the sixth of eight in RKO's film series about The Saint.

The central cast was identical to the previous entry, The Saint Takes Over. Sanders returned as Templar (his final performance in the role), with Jonathan Hale making his own final appearance as Inspector Farnack (the character would next be seen in The Saint in Manhattan, a 1980s television pilot). Wendy Barrie makes her third and final appearance, once again playing a different character. Paul Guilfoyle reprises the role of Clarence "Pearly" Gates from the previous film. The director, Jack Hively, was the son of the film's editor, George Hively. The storyline involves The Saint pursuing rare stamps at a Palm Springs, California hotel.

== Plot ==
Simon Templar is asked by his friend, Inspector Farnack, to protect Peter Johnson, a man trying to transport three stamps, valued at $200,000, from New York City to his niece Elna, a tennis pro for a hotel in Palm Springs, California. Templar interrupts an attempted robbery, but is too late to save Johnson's life. He does strike the unseen assailant in the face with his ring, which bears his distinctive Saint sign.

On the train west, Templar introduces himself to the attractive Margaret Forbes, who will be staying at the same Palm Springs hotel. There the stamps are stolen from Templar, which does not endear him to Elna Johnson. Templar's friend, reformed pickpocket Clarence "Pearly" Gates, is employed by the hotel to provide security, so Templar persuades him to steal the belongings from every other hotel guest in an effort to identify the thief. The stamps are found in a pillbox, but Gates cannot remember who it belongs to. An attempt to trap the thief by allowing the guests robbed to reclaim their property fails and ends in the murder of a policeman, but Templar avoids losing the stamps again and returns them to Elna.

Templar sets a trap for the thief. Johnson is held up at gunpoint by Forbes, who turns out to be an agent for the country from which the stamps were smuggled. Forbes is killed by a rival thief while making her getaway, but the stamps are safe. Simon sets another trap at Joshua Tree National Park, where another hotel guest is revealed to be the mastermind of the other crooks. Templar tricks him into confessing to the murders of Peter Johnson, the policeman and Margaret Forbes in the presence of the Police Commissioner and his men, and the whole gang is arrested. The mark from Templar's ring on his face is additional proof of the murderers guilt.

Elna Johnson shows her romantic interest in Templar, but he tells her that, while he is tempted, he prefers to play singles, rather than doubles.

== Cast ==
- George Sanders as Simon Templar
- Wendy Barrie as Elna Johnson
- Jonathan Hale as Inspector Farnack
- Paul Guilfoyle as "Pearly" Gates
- Linda Hayes as Margaret Forbes
- Harry Shannon as Chief Graves
- Ferris Taylor as Evans
- Eddie Dunn as Detective Barker
- Frank O'Connor as Detective Brady
- Charles Quigley as Mr. Fletcher
- Henry Roquemore as Thomas Flannery
- George Lynn as Jimmy
- Edmund Elton as Peter Johnson
- Vinton Hayworth as Charlie, Desk Clerk
- Arthur Loft as Detective Grady
- Richard Crane as Whitey
- Brooks Benedict as Hotel Guest
- Mary MacLaren as Hotel Maid

== Reception ==
The film made a profit of $90,000.

== Bibliography ==
- Backer, Ron. Mystery Movie Series of 1940s Hollywood. McFarland, 2010.
- Fetrow, Alan G. Feature Films, 1940-1949: a United States Filmography. McFarland, 1994.
