= The Saint on the Spanish Main =

Book by Leslie Charteris

- First edition (US)
- Author: Leslie Charteris
- Language: English
- Series: The Saint
- Genre: Mystery fiction
- Publisher: The Crime Club
- Publication date: 1955
- Publication place: United Kingdom
- Media type: Print (hardback & paperback)
- Preceded by: The Saint in Europe
- Followed by: The Saint Around the World

The Saint on the Spanish Main is a collection of short stories by Leslie Charteris, first published in 1955 by The Crime Club in the United States and Hodder and Stoughton in the United Kingdom. This book continues the adventures of Simon Templar, alias The Saint, and is the second of three consecutive books that take a "travelogue" approach to the stories, with each taking place in a different exotic locale.

== Stories ==
The book consisted of 6 stories:

1. Bimini: The Effete Angler: A chance encounter with an arrogant business man raises paranoia about the Saint. Charteris addresses the reader several times in this story, which is also more sexually explicit than previous Saint stories.
2. Nassau: The Arrow of God: Templar investigates the bizarre murder of an acerbic journalist.
3. Jamaica: The Black Commissar (titled The Man from Moscow in some editions): Simon reunites with characters from "The Arrow of God" and "The Masked Angel" (from an earlier book, Call for the Saint) to bring down a communist sympathizer who has installed himself as dictator of a semi-autonomous area of Jamaica.
4. Puerto Rico: The Unkind Philanthropist: Simon engages in a little identity theft as he plays a confidence scheme on a crooked businessman. The story is notable for having Templar directly refer to author Leslie Charteris by name and revealing in dialogue that novels based on his adventures exist in continuity.
5. The Virgin Islands: The Old Treasure Story: Simon engages the help of a film crew in aiding a woman in a race against time to recover a sunken treasure.
6. Haiti: The Questing Tycoon: Templar squares off against a man who is taking advantage of a young woman who may or may not be a voodoo priestess.

Some editions, such as the 1955 Avon Books printing, omit the Nassau and Puerto Rico stories, despite one of the remaining stories being a sequel to the former.

== Television adaptations ==
Several stories from this collection formed the basis for episodes of the 1962-69 TV series, The Saint.

"The Arrow of God" was broadcast during the first series (episode 7) on 15 November 1962, followed by "The Effete Angler" on 29 November (episode 9). During the third series, "The Unkind Philanthropist" was broadcast on 24 December 1964 (episode 12). The Questing Tycoon was broadcast on 25 February 1965 as episode 21 of series 3 under the title "Sibao". "The Old Treasure Story" was broadcast as the final episode of the fourth series on 26 August 1965.
