= The Saint Sees it Through =

1946 novel by Leslie Charteris

The Saint Sees It Through
- First edition (US)
- Author: Leslie Charteris
- Language: English
- Series: The Saint
- Genre: Mystery novel
- Publisher: The Crime Club
- Publication date: 1946
- Publication place: United Kingdom
- Media type: Print (Hardback & Paperback)
- Preceded by: The Saint on Guard
- Followed by: Call for the Saint

The Saint Sees It Through is the title of a mystery novel by Leslie Charteris featuring his creation, Simon Templar, alias The Saint. The book was first published in 1946 in the United States by The Crime Club. Hodder and Stoughton published the first British edition in 1947.

This was the final full-length novel featuring Templar to be solely written by Charteris, as the author chose to concentrate on short stories and novella-length Saint stories hereafter. The next full-length Saint novel, Vendetta for the Saint (1964), would be credited to Charteris, but actually written by Harry Harrison.

== Story summary ==
Once again back in New York City, Simon Templar, continuing to act as an agent for his wartime contact, Hamilton, investigates a crime syndicate in its infancy using opium smuggled from China in the chaos following the end of the war as the basis for even bigger crimes, including murder. Along the way he partners with Avalon Dexter, a beautiful lounge singer.

== Television adaptation ==
The Saint Sees It Through was loosely adapted as an episode of the TV series The Saint that aired during the second season. It was first broadcast on 19 March 1964. It is one of the few full-length Saint novels to be adapted for television.
