= The Saint in Europe =

1953 collection of short stories by Leslie Charteris

- First UK edition
- Author: Leslie Charteris
- Language: English
- Series: The Saint
- Genre: Mystery, Short Stories
- Publisher: Hodder & Stoughton
- Publication date: 1953
- Publication place: United Kingdom
- Media type: Print (hardback & paperback)
- Preceded by: Saint Errant
- Followed by: The Saint on the Spanish Main

The Saint in Europe is a collection of short stories by Leslie Charteris, first published in 1953 by The Crime Club in the United States and in 1954 by Hodder and Stoughton in the United Kingdom. This was the 29th book to feature the adventures of Simon Templar, alias "The Saint", and it also marked a resumption of the book series after a five-year hiatus. The publication of this book also marked the 25th anniversary of the character.

The Saint in Europe marked the beginning of the "travelogue" era for The Saint. Continuing with the theme started by The Saint in New York, The Saint in Miami, and The Saint Goes West, the stories in this and the following two volumes take place in different exotic locales around the world. As such, it is the first Saint book since the 1938 short story collection The Happy Highwayman to not be primarily set in the United States. By this time, however, Templar's British origins have been obscured and he is referred to as an American at least once.

== Stories ==
The book consisted of 7 stories:

1. Paris: The Covetous Headsman: After a man is found beheaded, Simon helps the victim's sister track down the culprit.
2. Amsterdam: The Angel's Eye: An American couple recruits Templar to recover a missing diamond the size of the Hope Diamond.
3. The Rhine: The Rhine Maiden: On board a train speeding across Germany, Simon takes matters into his own hands when he meets a Dutch father and daughter who have died savings to a swindler. Includes a metafictional reference to the Saint comic strip.
4. Tirol: The Golden Journey: Templar sets out to hoist a spoiled young woman on her own petard by taking her on a rugged backpacking trip. A change-of-pace story with no actual mystery or adventure elements.
5. Lucerne: The Loaded Tourist: After Simon witnesses a murder, he finds himself intrigued by the contents of the dead man's suitcase.
6. Juan-Les-Pins: The Spanish Cow: Simon plots a jewel heist.
7. Rome: The Latin Touch: When the visiting U.S. Secretary of State's daughter is kidnapped by a Mafia kingpin, Templar volunteers to rescue her.

== Television adaptations ==
All seven stories from this collection formed the basis for episodes of the 1962-69 TV series, The Saint.

During the first season, "The Latin Touch" aired on 11 October 1962 as the second episode, followed by "The Covetous Headsman" on 25 October, "The Loaded Tourist" on 1 November and "The Golden Journey" on 6 December. During the third season, "The Rhine Maiden" aired on 21 January 1965. The fourth season saw an adaptation of "The Spanish Cow" air on 19 August 1965 and the fifth season saw "The Angel's Eye" appear on 11 November 1966.
