= Meet the Tiger =

Novel by Leslie Charteris

- First edition
- Author: Leslie Charteris
- Language: English
- Series: The Saint
- Genre: Mystery, adventure
- Publisher: Ward Lock
- Publication date: 1928
- Publication place: United Kingdom
- Media type: Print (hardback & paperback)
- Followed by: Enter the Saint

Meet the Tiger is an action-adventure novel written by Leslie Charteris. In England it was first published by Ward Lock in September 1928; in the United States it was first published by Doubleday's The Crime Club imprint in March 1929 with the variant title Meet – the Tiger!. It was the first novel in a long-running series of books (lasting into the 1980s) featuring the adventures of Simon Templar, alias "The Saint". It was later reissued under a number of different titles, including the unofficial Crooked Gold by Amalgamated Press in 1929 which failed to credit the authorship of Charteris, and the best-known reissue title, The Saint Meets the Tiger. In 1940 the Sun Dial Press changed the title to Meet – the Tiger! The Saint in Danger.

Templar is introduced as a young adventurer 27 years of age, who is independently wealthy and accompanied by a manservant named Orace. Templar and Orace stay in a pillbox that Simon has purchased from the Ministry of Defence in the small North Devon seaside town of Baycombe, their intent to foil a plan by a mysterious individual known only as "The Tiger" to smuggle stolen gold. Templar's motivation is to settle an old score with The Tiger, with whom he has had prior dealings though he's never actually met the villain, and to return the gold to its proper owner and collect the reward.

Meet the Tiger is not a "whodunit" but rather a "whoisit", as the identity of The Tiger is not revealed immediately and Templar (and the reader) is left guessing as to which inhabitant of Baycombe is the villain.

During this adventure, Templar meets a young lady named Patricia Holm and falls in love with her, even more so once she starts displaying distinctly "Saintly" qualities, including sharing Templar's taste for adventure and danger. Holm becomes the protagonist for the middle third of the novel during a period when she believes Templar to be dead and decides to continue following his plan to foil the Tiger. Holm went on to become a recurring character in most of the Saint stories published over the next two decades, although she never again took the spotlight as she did in Meet the Tiger. Orace meanwhile, features in the same role of manservant/housekeeper in subsequent books. In the 1934 novel 'The Misfortunes of Mr. Teal' Charteris introduced another recurring ally, an American gangster named Hoppy Uniatz, an old friend and accomplice of Templar's from their adventures in New York.

Another character in the book is Detective Carn, a police officer posing in Baycombe as a professor and who also is in pursuit of the Tiger and his minions (dubbed Tiger Cubs). Carn and Templar form an uneasy alliance, and the character appears to be a template for the later character of Inspector Claud Eustace Teal, who would become a recurring ally/adversary of Templar's in later Saint adventures after making his debut in the 1929 non-Saint novel Daredevil.

Meet the Tiger was a commercial success when it was published, and in 1930 Charteris decided to turn the adventures of Simon Templar into a series, writing three novella-length adventures featuring the character that were initially published in magazines and then in 1930 as Enter the Saint; this was followed later the same year by The Last Hero, a novel-length adventure. Charteris would go on to write more than 100 Saint adventures over the next three decades, in a mixture of formats including novels, short stories and novellas. His character would be featured in several radio series in the 1940s and 1950s, a series of Hollywood films in the 1930s–50s, and most notably a television series of the 1960s starring Roger Moore.

In his introduction to the 1980 reprinting of Meet the Tiger by Charter Books, Charteris all but disowned the work, stating "I can see so much wrong with it that I am humbly astonished that it got published at all" and dismissing it as an early work by a writer who was less than 21 years of age at the time. In a 1960s edition of Enter the Saint, Charteris goes so far as to define Enter the Saint as the first Templar book, ignoring Meet the Tiger. Nonetheless, Charteris acknowledged that Meet the Tiger was an important work, if for no reason other than it launched the long-running series of books that became, effectively, his life's work. Charteris would also refer back to the events of this novel on several later occasions, most notably in the prologue to The Saint in New York.

== Film adaptation ==
In 1943, Meet the Tiger was adapted as the motion picture The Saint Meets the Tiger. Although the film takes some liberties with the novel (the character of Carn, for example, becomes Inspector Teal, Templar's regular police adversary in the film series and later books) and the plot is sparked by a murder on Templar's doorstep (which does not occur in the book), the basic plot remains the same.

The film starred Hugh Sinclair as Templar, with Jean Gillie as Patricia Holm, Wylie Watson as Horace (renamed from the original book's Orace), and Clifford Evans as the Tiger. To date it is the only film adaptation of The Saint in which the character of Holm appears; in the books she shares most of Templar's adventures before Charteris phased her out in the late 1940s; film adaptations of stories originally featuring Holm would substitute different female characters. Holm would, however, be portrayed in an unbroadcast pilot episode for a Saint TV series produced in 2013 and eventually released to DVD in 2017.
