= Return of the Saint =

British TV action series (1978–1979)

- Created by: Leslie Charteris
- Starring: Ian Ogilvy
- Country of origin: United Kingdom
- No. of episodes: 24

Production
- Running time: 48–50 min
- Production companies: ITC for ATV and RAI

Original release
- Network: ITV
- Release: 10 September 1978 – 11 March 1979

Related
- The Saint

Return of the Saint is a British action-adventure television series that aired for one series in 1978 and 1979 in Britain on ITV, and was also broadcast on CBS in the United States. It was co-produced by ITC Entertainment and the Italian broadcaster RAI. 24 episodes were broadcast.

== Premise ==
Return of the Saint is a revival/updating of The Saint, a programme based on the stories of Leslie Charteris, which had originally aired from 1962 to 1969, and starred Roger Moore as Simon Templar (the character, in turn, had been introduced by Charteris in a series of novels and short stories dating back to 1928). The new series starred Ian Ogilvy as Templar, an independently wealthy, somewhat mysterious 'do-gooder' known as 'The Saint'. Templar is shown travelling around Britain and Europe, helping out the people he encounters, though he is also often summoned by past acquaintances.

The series borrowed a few storytelling elements from its predecessor. Once again, each episode began with Simon narrating an introduction to set the scene for viewers, and each pre-credit sequence ended with an animated halo appearing above Templar's head as he was identified. Return also made a recurring reference to the 1930s–1940s film series, and the 1940s radio series that starred Vincent Price as Templar: just before the opening credits begin, a short musical phrase is heard that is not part of the theme music for Return of the Saint but is the character's signature theme from film and radio. Unlike the film series and occasional episodes of the Roger Moore series, Ogilvy's series did not feature any recurring characters besides Simon.

Other than these cosmetic touches, there is no continuity implied between the Ogilvy and Moore series.

== Production ==
One major difference between the two series is that the original was mostly filmed in British studios and locations (although set in various places around the world), while many episodes of Return were filmed on location throughout Europe. The music was written by John Scott and, like the last colour series of The Saint, incorporated Leslie Charteris' own theme, which had previously been used in films and on radio. For the French version, Scott's music was replaced with a theme incorporating vocals (as had happened to previous Saint composer Edwin Astley with Danger Man), but Charteris' eight-note theme remained.

Jaguar seized promotional opportunities with Return of the Saint. A decade-and-a-half earlier, Jaguar had turned down the producers of The Saint when approached about the E-Type; the producers had instead used a Volvo P1800. In Return, Templar drives an XJ-S with the number plate "ST 1". Miniature versions were made by Corgi and proved popular.

According to Burl Barer in his history of The Saint, the series was originally conceived as Son of the Saint, with Ogilvy's character identified as the offspring of Simon Templar. As production neared, it was decided to drop the relative angle and make the series about the original character, albeit updated to the late 1970s.

Unlike the earlier series, Return of the Saint did not adapt any Charteris stories; however, several teleplays (such as "The Imprudent Professor" and "Collision Course") were adapted as novels that were credited to Charteris but written by others. A number of Saint books were reprinted with covers depicting Ogilvy as Templar as a tie-in with the series; these collectable volumes carried the Return of the Saint title. The adaptation of "Collision Course", retitled Salvage for the Saint, was published in 1983 (several years after the series ended) and was the 50th and final Saint book to be published in a series of publications dating back to the 1920s.

On a commentary on one of the episodes on the Australian DVD release of the series in 2004, it was revealed that the production ran into difficulties very soon after location shooting in Italy began during spring 1978. The Italian-employed crew were found to have a different work ethic and a significant language barrier, which led to substantial delays in shooting and a budget over-run. The head of ITC, Lew Grade, agreed to rechannel some of the money that he had kept back for a possible third season of Space: 1999 so as to plug the budget gap, while the Italian crew were sacked and ITC sent an additional British crew over to Italy to complete the shooting. This move enraged the series' Italian TV co-backer RAI, which had insisted that Italian crews should work on the production in Italy. To appease RAI, Grade gave it the remainder of the Space: 1999 money with which to shoot its own series with little or no input from ITC. This series – Seagull Island, starring Jeremy Brett and Prunella Ransome – was filmed in Italy during the summer of 1979, but was not transmitted by ITV until summer 1981, some two years after it had been made.

=== TV movie ===
The two "Collision Course" episodes were also re-edited together to form a syndicated TV movie, titled The Saint and the Brave Goose.

== Legacy ==
Ian Ogilvy starred as Simon Templar

Ogilvy became very popular in Britain and Europe because of the series, and in the early 1980s was considered a major contender for replacing Moore as James Bond. Ogilvy never took over the role, but did record a series of popular audiobook adaptations of the Bond novels in the late 1970s and played a Bond-like character for a 1980s TV commercial.

Broadcasts of the series on CBS, which lasted into 1980, sparked a revival of interest in Moore's original series.

Robert S. Baker, who had developed and produced the earlier The Saint series for Roger Moore, performed the same duties with Return of the Saint. Years later, Baker was also executive producer of the 1997 Saint film starring Val Kilmer as Templar.

Return of The Saint is now seen as the last of the action/adventure television series produced by ITC Entertainment.

== Charteris cameo ==
Saint creator Leslie Charteris makes an Alfred Hitchcock-style walk-on cameo appearance in the "Collision Course" two-parter.

== Episodes ==
Episode #	Original Air Date (UK)	Episode Title	Description
1–01	10 September 1978	"The Judas Game"	British Intelligence persuades Simon Templar to go to Albania and rescue its agent Selma Morrell, who formerly was Templar's girlfriend. Guest cast: Judy Geeson, Maurice Roëves, Olga Karlatos, Moray Watson
1–02	17 September 1978	"The Nightmare Man"	Templar and an actress friend investigate after a woman says she foresaw in a dream that an Italian diplomat would be assassinated in London. Guest cast: Joss Ackland, Moira Redmond, John Bennett, Kathryn Leigh Scott
1–03	24 September 1978	"Duel in Venice"	Templar is forced to play a game of cat-and-mouse with a ruthless mercenary who has kidnapped a friend's daughter. Guest cast: Cathryn Harrison, Maurice Colbourne, Carole André
1–04	1 October 1978	"One Black September"	Templar is paired with a female Israeli agent trying to track down an Arab terrorist-turned-informer, who has gone to ground in London. Guest cast: Prunella Gee, Garrick Hagon, Aubrey Morris
1–05	8 October 1978	"The Village That Sold its Soul"	Templar witnesses a woman's murder outside a remote Italian village. With help from the village priest, Templar brings the killer to justice. Guest cast: Giancarlo Prete, Maurice Denham, Tony Calvin
1–06	15 October 1978	"Assault Force"	Templar helps a dissident carry out the abduction of an official from an Asian country, but they are betrayed by someone who secretly works for the regime. Guest cast: Kate O'Mara, Burt Kwouk, Bryan Marshall
1–07	22 October 1978	"Yesterday's Hero"	Templar investigates when a former British agent released after years of captivity begins a bizarre campaign against a former colleague. Guest cast: Ian Hendry, Annette Andre, Gerald Flood
1–08	29 October 1978	"The Poppy Chain"	Templar impersonates a member of a heroin-smuggling gang and travels to the south of France to meet the head of the organisation. Guest cast: Jenny Hanley, Laurence Naismith, Grégoire Aslan
1–09	5 November 1978	"The Arrangement"	Templar helps a writer whose husband is murdered by her friend, the wife of a politician, who wants her own husband murdered in return. Guest cast: Carolyn Seymour, Sarah Douglas, Michael Medwin
1–10	12 November 1978	"The Armageddon Alternative"	Templar must track down a bomber who will detonate a nuclear device in London unless an artist is executed in public. Guest cast: George Cole, Anouska Hempel, Donald Houston
1–11	19 November 1978	"The Imprudent Professor"	Templar is hired by a woman to protect her father, a scientist whose invention has made him a target for foreign powers. Guest cast: Catherine Schell, Susan Penhaligon, Anthony Steel
1–12	26 November 1978	"Signal Stop"	Templar investigates when a woman witnesses a man's murder from a passing train. The two are in danger when the killer tries to cover his tracks. Guest cast: Ciaran Madden, Frederick Jaeger, Ian Cullen
1–13	3 December 1978	"The Roman Touch"	Templar stages a pop singer's kidnapping to free her from her unscrupulous manager, only for the man to kidnap her back. Guest cast: Kim Goody, Laurence Luckinbill, Linda Thorson, The Saints
1–14	10 December 1978	"Tower Bridge is Falling Down"	Templar helps a woman whose father was killed by his ruthless business partner. Templar devises an elaborate con to expose the man. Guest cast: John Woodvine, Alfie Bass, Paul Maxwell
1–15	17 December 1978	"The Debt Collectors"	Templar helps a woman whose sister, imprisoned on espionage charges, has broken out of prison and gone on the run. Guest cast: Mary Tamm, Diane Keen, Anton Rodgers
1–16	7 January 1979	"Collision Course Part I: The Brave Goose"	Templar helps the widow of a powerboat racer, who is being menaced by her late husband's criminal associates. Guest cast: Gayle Hunnicutt, Stratford Johns, Derren Nesbitt
1–17	14 January 1979	"Collision Course Part II: The Sixth Man"	The gang want the gold that the dead man helped them to steal years earlier, and force Templar and the woman to help them find it. Guest cast: Gayle Hunnicutt, Stratford Johns, Derren Nesbitt
1–18	21 January 1979	"Hot Run"	Templar investigates when a man is shot dead on a ski slope, and discovers the dead man was linked to a gang who are planning a gold robbery. Guest cast: Rula Lenska, Barry Andrews, Struan Rodger
1–19	28 January 1979	"Murder Cartel"	Templar impersonates an infamous hitman in order to infiltrate an organisation planning the assassination of an oil sheikh. Guest cast: Britt Ekland, Helmut Berger, Marne Maitland
1–20	4 February 1979	"The Obono Affair"	Templar is called in when the young son of an African dictator is held for ransom. He discovers that someone close to the dictator is behind events. Guest cast: Jack Hedley, Thomas Baptiste, Muriel Odunton
1–21	11 February 1979	"Vicious Circle"	Templar investigates when his racing driver friend dies in a car crash, and discovers that he was run off the road by a hired killer. Guest cast: Elsa Martinelli, Tessa Wyatt, Mel Ferrer
1–22	25 February 1979	"Dragonseed"	Templar investigates when the son of a billionaire is killed in a helicopter crash, and finds that dark family secrets provide the motive for murder. Guest cast: Sam Wanamaker, Paolo Malco, Shane Rimmer
1–23	4 March 1979	"Appointment in Florence"	Templar investigates after a friend is killed by terrorists. He tracks one of them to Florence, but the rest of the gang follow him there. Guest cast: Stuart Wilson, James Aubrey
1–24	11 March 1979	"The Diplomat's Daughter"	Templar helps a French woman whose gambler brother is in debt to crooks and has been coerced into helping them smuggle drugs into the UK. Guest cast: Lynn Dalby, Karl Held, Murray Head, Stanley McGeagh
