= The Saint in Miami =

1940 novel by Leslie Charteris

- First US edition cover
- Author: Leslie Charteris
- Language: English
- Series: The Saint
- Genre: Mystery novel
- Publisher: The Crime Club
- Publication date: 1940
- Publication place: United Kingdom
- Media type: Print (Hardback & Paperback)
- Preceded by: The Happy Highwayman
- Followed by: The Saint Goes West

The Saint in Miami is the title of a mystery novel by Leslie Charteris featuring his creation, Simon Templar, alias The Saint. As with an earlier release, Follow the Saint, the order of publication for this book was changed. Instead of being published first in the United Kingdom by Hodder and Stoughton, as had been custom for most previous volumes, the first edition instead came out in 1940 in the United States, published by The Crime Club. The first UK edition (by H&S) followed in 1941. Most future Charteris-written Saint books would be published in the United States first hereafter.

After this publication, the frequency of Saint books decreased. Previously, Charteris would publish at least one (often more than one) volume per year, but the next Saint book would not appear until 1942, though in recent years a manuscript for a novella titled The Saint's Second Front has been discovered, which was submitted for publication in 1941, but rejected.

The Saint in Miami was the first Saint novel published after the outbreak of World War II and is the first of several stories pitting Templar against Nazi operatives. It also marks the start of Charteris phasing out the character of Patricia Holm, who would not appear in print again until "The Masked Angel", one of the two novellas compiled in the 1948 release, Call for the Saint. Beginning with this novel, Templar's adventures take place primarily in the United States, or North America. The next non-American Saint adventures would not be published until The Saint in Europe in 1953.

== Plot summary ==
One of Patricia Holm's friends sends an invitation for Patricia and her friend, Simon Templar to visit Miami. Upon arrival, however, The Saint, Patricia and sidekick Hoppy Uniatz discover Pat's friend and her husband are nowhere to be found. The trio take up residence in the friend's house. A few days later, a tanker explodes off the Florida coast, and soon after, Simon discovers the dead body of a sailor washed up on shore; attached to the wrist of the body is a lifebelt from the British submarine H.M.S. Triton. Simon suspects a link between the disappearance of Patricia's friends, the explosion, and a millionaire yachtsman named Randolph March. March's yacht is moored not far from the explosion, and Templar and Hoppy launch the investigation by climbing aboard the yacht, leaving the sailor's corpse in a stateroom for the police to find, and challenging March to give up his secrets. Afterwards, Templar finds himself targeted not only by March, but by an eager local sheriff who proves to be almost as fast-witted as the Saint, himself.

Soon, the Saint uncovers a Nazi ring operating out of Florida.
