= The Crime Club =

Imprint of the Doubleday publishing company

- Parent company: Doubleday
- Founded: 1928
- Country of origin: United States
- Headquarters location: 1745 Broadway, New York City, U.S.
- Distribution: Worldwide
- Fiction genres: Crime, mystery

The Crime Club was an imprint of the Doubleday publishing company, which later spawned a 1946-47 anthology radio series, and a 1937–1939 film series.

== Literature ==
Many classic and popular works of detective and mystery fiction had their first U.S. editions published via the Crime Club, including all 50 books of The Saint by Leslie Charteris (1928-1983), several of Georges Simenon's Maigret mysteries, and at least one work (The Glass Cell) by Patricia Highsmith. The imprint also published first editions in Sax Rohmer's Fu Manchu series.

The Crime Club began life in 1928 with the publication of The Desert Moon Mystery by Kay Cleaver Strahan, and ceased publication in 1991. In the intervening 63 years, The Crime Club published 2,492 titles.

== Radio ==
Stories from this imprint were first dramatized on The Eno Crime Club, a detective series broadcast on CBS from February 9, 1931 to December 21, 1932, sponsored by Eno Effervescent Salts. The Crime Club novels were not adapted for the later Eno Crime Clues, heard on the Blue Network from January 3, 1933 to June 30. 1936.

The Crime Club returned on the Mutual Broadcasting System as a half-hour radio series with adaptations from the Doubleday imprint. Each installment was introduced by the series host, The Librarian, portrayed by Barry Thomson and Raymond Edward Johnson (who was better known as the host of Inner Sanctum Mystery). The series began December 2, 1946 and continued until October 16, 1947.

== Film ==
In 1937, Universal Pictures made a deal with Crime Club and were granted the right to select four of their yearly published novels to adapt into films. The unit responsible for these films was producer Irving Starr with former film editor Otis Garrett often directing. Eleven films were made in the series between 1937 and 1939. The first film in the series was The Westland Case, based on the Jonathan Latimer novel Headed for a Hearse.

=== List of Crime Club films ===
- The Westland Case (1937)
- The Black Doll (1938)
- The Lady in the Morgue (1938)
- Danger on the Air (1938)
- The Last Express (1938)
- Gambling Ship (1938)
- The Last Warning (1938)
- Mystery of the White Room (1939)
- Inside Information (1939)
- The House of Fear (1939)
- The Witness Vanishes (1939)

== See also ==
- Collins Crime Club

== References and sources ==
Sources

- Dunning, John. Tune in Yesterday: The Ultimate Encyclopedia of Old-Time Radio, 1925-1976 (1976) ISBN 0-13-932616-2
- Nehr, Ellen. Doubleday Crime Club Compendium 1928-1991 (1992) ISBN 0-9634420-0-7
- Weaver, Tom; Brunas, Michael; Brunas, John (2007) [1990]. Universal Horrors (2 ed.). McFarland & Company. ISBN 978-0-7864-2974-5.
