= Send for the Saint =

1977 novella collection by Peter Bloxsom

- First edition
- Author: Peter Bloxsom, based upon stories by John Kruse and Donald James, and characters by Leslie Charteris
- Language: English
- Series: The Saint
- Genre: Mystery, Novellas
- Publisher: Hodder & Stoughton
- Publication date: 1977
- Publication place: United Kingdom
- Media type: Print (Hardback & Paperback)
- Preceded by: The Saint and the Hapsburg Necklace
- Followed by: The Saint in Trouble

Send for the Saint is a collection of two mystery novellas by Peter Bloxsom, based upon stories by John Kruse and Donald James written for the 1962-1969 television series The Saint and continuing the adventures of the sleuth Simon Templar, created by Leslie Charteris. As per the custom of the time, Charteris received front-cover author credit while Bloxsom was credited inside; Charteris served in an editorial capacity.

This book was first published in the United Kingdom in 1977 by Hodder and Stoughton, followed by an American edition by The Crime Club in 1978.

The titles of the stories were changed from the original TV episodes.

== Stories ==
The book consists of the following stories:

1. The Midas Double (story by John Kruse) (based on "The Double Take")
2. The Pawn Gamble (story by Donald James) (based on "The Organisation Man")
