= The Saint Returns =

- US hardcover edition
- Author: Fleming Lee (based upon teleplays by John Kruse, D. R. Motton and Leigh Vance and characters by Leslie Charteris)
- Language: English
- Series: The Saint
- Genre: Mystery, Novellas
- Publisher: The Crime Club
- Publication date: 1968
- Publication place: United Kingdom
- Media type: Print (Hardback & Paperback)
- Preceded by: The Saint on TV
- Followed by: The Saint and the Fiction Makers

The Saint Returns is a collection of two mystery novellas by Fleming Lee, continuing the adventures of the sleuth Simon Templar a.k.a. "The Saint", created by Leslie Charteris. This book was first published in the United States in 1968 by The Crime Club, and in the United Kingdom in 1969 by Hodder and Stoughton.

Although credited to Leslie Charteris on the front cover, Fleming Lee was credited with writing the novellas, which were adaptations of episodes from the 1962-69 television series The Saint. Charteris served in an editorial capacity.

== Stories ==
The book consisted of the following stories:

1. The Dizzy Daughter - based on the teleplay 'Little Girl Lost' by Leigh Vance, from a story by D. R. Motton.
2. The Gadget Lovers - based on the teleplay by John Kruse.
