= Catch the Saint =

Collection of novellas by Fleming Lee

- First edition cover
- Author: Fleming Lee, based upon stories by Norman Worker, and characters by Leslie Charteris
- Language: English
- Series: The Saint
- Genre: Mystery, Novellas
- Publisher: The Crime Club
- Publication date: 1975
- Publication place: United Kingdom
- Media type: Print (Hardback & Paperback)
- ISBN: 0-385-09936-3
- OCLC: 1339003
- Dewey Decimal: 813/.5/4
- LC Class: PZ4.L4774 Cat PS3562.E35
- Preceded by: The Saint and the People Importers
- Followed by: The Saint and the Hapsburg Necklace

Catch the Saint is a collection of two mystery novellas by Fleming Lee, based upon stories by Norman Worker continuing the adventures of the sleuth Simon Templar a.k.a. "The Saint", created by Leslie Charteris. Following usual practice at this point in the series, the front cover credits Charteris, although Lee and Worker receive interior title page credit; Charteris served in an editorial capacity. Some editions misspell the author's name "Flemming Lee."

This book was first published in the United Kingdom in 1975 by Hodder & Stoughton, followed by an American edition by The Crime Club.

Charteris, in his foreword to this volume, defines Catch the Saint as an experiment in trying to return Simon Templar to his roots in 1930s mystery fiction. While recent Saint novellas and novels published since 1968 had taken place in contemporary times and had been either adaptations of teleplays from the 1962–69 TV series, The Saint, or based upon storylines from the Saint comic strip, the two stories in Catch the Saint were original works said to take place prior to the Second World War. This makes Catch the Saint the first original (non-adapted) Saint stories to be published since 1964's Vendetta for the Saint.

These were the last Simon Templar novellas to be written by Fleming Lee.

== Stories ==
The book consisted of the following stories:

1. The Masterpiece Merchant
2. The Adoring Socialite
