= The Saint's Second Front =

Unpublished novel by Leslie Charteris

- Author: Leslie Charteris
- Language: English
- Series: The Saint
- Genre: Spy fiction
- Publisher: none, rejected
- Publication place: United Kingdom
- Media type: typographed single manuscript
- Pages: 237

The Saint's Second Front is the title of the working typescript of a The Saint (Simon Templar) novel written by Leslie Charteris in or around the summer of 1941. It describes a (foiled) military attack by Japan on America. It was rejected from publication by Cosmopolitan on the grounds that "we do not think this is the time to publish anything which might aggravate the tensions with our Japanese friends", months before the Attack on Pearl Harbor.

== Plot ==
The Saint unearths a plan by a clandestine Japanese army known as the Black Dragon to attack southern California by surprise as a prelude to a larger invasion.

The Saint acts.

== 'Lost' manuscript ==
The work was known through interviews with the author, but he also confessed he gave away the only manuscript. It was therefore presumed lost. The 237-page typewritten document "with manuscript corrections in pencil by the author" which he gave to a friend in Ireland, emerged at a private auction in 2017 with Max Hasler of London-based Forum Auctions. It was put on auction December 6, estimated to fetch £7,500 to £10,000, but it did not sell. As of 2019, it is unknown if there are any plans to publish the novel.

This is the only known unpublished full-length Saint novel by Charteris, though two manuscripts edited by him later years were also rejected for publication: Bet on the Saint (1968) by Fleming Lee and The Saint's Lady (1979) by Joy Martin.
