= The Saint's Lady =

1979 novel by Joy Martin

- Author: Joy Martin
- Language: English
- Series: The Saint
- Genre: Mystery
- Publisher: NA
- Publication date: Unpublished; written 1979
- Publication place: United Kingdom
- Media type: Manuscript

The Saint's Lady is an unpublished novel by Joy Martin featuring the character of criminal-turned-detective Simon Templar (alias "The Saint") who had been created by Leslie Charteris in 1928.

According to the book The Saint: A Complete History in Print, Radio, Film and Television 1928-1992 by Burl Barer, Martin sent her manuscript to Leslie Charteris as a present in 1979. On its own, this would qualify the novel as no more than fan fiction. However Charteris, who at the time was editing a series of continuation books featuring The Saint (he had stopped writing the character full-time in 1963) was impressed enough by the manuscript to offer it to the British publishers of the Saint series, Hodder & Stoughton, for publication as the next book in the series.

Barer writes that Hodder & Stoughton rejected the manuscript, apparently on the grounds that Martin had made Templar sound too Scottish.

The manuscript is in the archives at Boston University.

Although Barer does not describe the plot of The Saint's Lady, he does quote from the book, and it is notable that the novel would have seen the return of Templar's longtime girlfriend/partner Patricia Holm after an absence from the Saint series of more than 30 years (her most recent appearance as of 1979 having been in the 1948 short story collection Saint Errant. It is not known, however, if the title is a direct reference to Holm. Martin would have also become the first woman to publish an English-language Saint novel, although it is not known whether she would have received author credit on the cover as at this time the practice was for the books to be credited to Charteris (with the collaborative authors credited inside).

This is not the only Saint novel to remain unpublished. Barer also provides an outline of Bet on the Saint, a 1968 collaboration between Charteris and Fleming Lee based on a Saint comic strip storyline, which was rejected by Doubleday (Charteris' American publishers). And, recently, an unpublished Charteris manuscript from the early 1940s, The Saint's Second Front, has been discovered.

Also, according to "The Saintly Bible", Ian Dickerson was at one time developing a novel out of an unrealized film project entitled Son of the Saint. As of 2020 this book has yet to see print.
