= The Saint in Pursuit =

1970 novel by Fleming Lee and Leslie Charteris

- US hardcover edition
- Author: Fleming Lee and Leslie Charteris
- Language: English
- Series: The Saint
- Genre: Mystery novel
- Publisher: The Crime Club
- Publication date: 1970
- Publication place: United Kingdom
- Media type: Print (Hardback & Paperback)
- Preceded by: The Saint Abroad
- Followed by: The Saint and the People Importers

The Saint in Pursuit is the title of a 1970 mystery novel featuring the character of Simon Templar, alias "The Saint". The novel is credited to Leslie Charteris, who created the Saint in 1928, but the book was authored by Fleming Lee and is adapted from a comic strip story by Charteris. Charteris served in an editorial capacity on the adaptation. It was the first full-length Saint novel since 1964's Vendetta for the Saint and the first to be based upon a Charteris story since the author's final solo work, The Saint in the Sun in 1963.

The book was first published in the United States by The Crime Club in 1970, and in the United Kingdom by Hodder and Stoughton the same year. The book was written several years earlier, and according to Saint historian Burl Barer had been written by Lee as a replacement for Bet on the Saint, another comic strip novelization that had been rejected for publication.
