= The Saint Abroad =

- First edition
- Author: Fleming Lee (based upon teleplays by Michael Pertwee and characters by Leslie Charteris)
- Language: English
- Series: The Saint
- Genre: Mystery, Novellas
- Publisher: The Crime Club
- Publication date: 1969
- Publication place: United Kingdom
- Media type: Print (Hardback & Paperback)
- Preceded by: The Saint and the Fiction Makers
- Followed by: The Saint in Pursuit

The Saint Abroad is a collection of two mystery novellas by Fleming Lee that continues the adventures of the sleuth Simon Templar (a.k.a. "The Saint") created by Leslie Charteris. This book was first published in the United States in 1969 by The Crime Club and in the United Kingdom in 1970 by Hodder and Stoughton.

Although credited to Leslie Charteris on the front cover, Fleming Lee was credited with writing the novellas. The novellas were based on two episodes from the 1962-69 television series The Saint, originally written by Michael Pertwee. Charteris served in an editorial capacity for the episodes.

== Stories ==
The book consisted of the following stories:

1. "The Art Collectors"
2. "The Persistent Patriots"
