= Bet on the Saint =

1968 novel by Fleming Lee and Leslie Charteris

- Author: Fleming Lee and Leslie Charteris
- Language: English
- Series: The Saint
- Genre: Mystery
- Publisher: NA
- Publication date: Unpublished; written 1968
- Publication place: United Kingdom
- Media type: Manuscript

Bet on the Saint is the title of an unpublished novel by Fleming Lee (credited to Leslie Charteris), featuring the character of criminal-turned-detective Simon Templar (alias "The Saint"), created by Charteris in 1928.

The novel was written in 1968. Charteris had effectively retired from writing the stories in 1963, and served in an editorial capacity overseeing a new series of Saint novels and novellas by other writers.

According to the book The Saint: A Complete History in Print, Radio, Film and Television 1928-1992 by Burl Barer, Charteris and Lee collaborated on this novel, which was based upon a storyline from the earlier The Saint comic strip. The plot, as described by Barer, is science fiction, and depicts Templar's attempts to stop the distribution of a performance-enhancing drug that endows athletes with super-human strength.

Barer writes that neither Charteris nor Lee were particularly happy with the final manuscript, although Charteris did "copious rewrites". Breaking a pattern he had maintained for nearly 40 years, Charteris chose not to submit Bet on the Saint to his longtime British publishers, Hodder & Stoughton. Instead, he submitted it solely to Doubleday, the company that ran The Crime Club imprint which had published the first US editions of every Saint book since 1928. Doubleday rejected it, and Charteris offered first publication rights to other US publishers. However, he was unable to find an alternative publisher and Bet on the Saint was abandoned.

Fleming Lee afterwards completed another comic strip adaptation, The Saint in Pursuit, which was accepted for publication by both Hodder & Stoughton and Doubleday/Crime Club after Charteris edited the manuscript. It was published in 1970.

To date, this "lost" Saint novel remains unpublished and a copy of the manuscript is kept with a collection of Charteris' papers at Boston University.

This is one of three known Saint novels that were never published. The others were a 1979 work by Joy Martin that was approved by Charteris entitled The Saint's Lady, and a recently discovered unpublished Charteris manuscript from the early 1940s titled The Saint's Second Front.
