= Fleming Lee =

American writer

- Born: Fleming Lee Blitch; December 19, 1933; St. Augustine, Florida, U.S.
- Died: December 24, 2012 (aged 79); Gainesville, Florida, U.S.
- Writing career
- Genre: Mystery fiction

Fleming Lee (December 19, 1933 – December 24, 2012), born Fleming Lee Blitch, was an American author, best known for his collaborations with Leslie Charteris on his series of "Saint" novels.

Fleming was born in St. Augustine, Florida, to Loonis Blitch and Jean Frances Fleming Blitch on December 19, 1933. He taught English at Washington State University, Miami University, Western College for Women and Florida Atlantic University. He also practiced law from 1978 to 1986 in Washington, D.C., and from 1987 to 2003 in central Florida.

He published his first book, a children's novel called The Amazing Adventures of Peter Grunt, was published in 1963 by J. B. Lippincott & Co. under his birth name. It went on to win the Parents Magazine "Best Work of Juvenile Fiction" award.

In 1968, Lee began ghostwriting a series of novels based on "The Saint", a character created by Leslie Charteris. Most of Lee's work consisted of adaptations of episodes from the television show The Saint, which starred Roger Moore. Charteris continued to receive cover billing as the author and served in an editorial capacity.

== Bibliography ==
=== Original works ===
All works credited to "Fleming Lee Blitch"

- The Amazing Adventures of Peter Grunt (1963)
- The Last Dragon (1964)
- The House on Felicity Street (1973) as Fleming Lee

=== The Saint ===
- The Saint on TV (1968); based on teleplays by John Kruse
- The Saint Returns (1968); based on teleplays by D.R.Motton and Leigh Vance and John Kruse
- The Saint and the Fiction Makers (1968); based on teleplay by John Kruse
- The Saint Abroad (1969); based on teleplays by Michael Pertwee
- The Saint in Pursuit (1970); based on the comic strip by Leslie Charteris
- The Saint and the People Importers (1971); based on a teleplay by Donald James from a story by Lee
- Catch the Saint (1975); based on stories by Norman Worker
