= The Saint on TV =

Mystery novella collection

- First edition (US)
- Author: Fleming Lee, based upon teleplays by John Kruse and characters by Leslie Charteris
- Language: English
- Series: The Saint
- Genre: Mystery fiction
- Publisher: The Crime Club
- Publication date: 1968
- Publication place: United Kingdom
- Media type: Print (Hardback & Paperback)
- Preceded by: Vendetta for the Saint
- Followed by: The Saint Returns

The Saint on TV is a collection of two mystery novellas by Fleming Lee, continuing the adventures of the sleuth Simon Templar a.k.a. "The Saint", created by Leslie Charteris. This book was first published in the United States in 1968 by The Crime Club, and in the United Kingdom later that year by Hodder and Stoughton. This is the first time since 1948's Call for the Saint that the novella format had been used in the series; with a few exceptions where full-length novels were published, the novella format would remain the norm until the series concluded in the early 1980s. It is the first of three Saint books to first see publication in 1968, which was also the 40th anniversary of the character's introduction.

This was the first of several volumes of stories novelising episodes of the 1962-69 television series The Saint. As with the previous volume, Vendetta for the Saint, Charteris receives front-cover author credit, when in fact other authors actually wrote the text. In his introduction to this book, Charteris names Fleming Lee as his hand-picked successor, and indicates his preference for having original storylines by John Kruse be used whenever possible. Charteris identifies this process "an unprecedented experiment in team work". In the foreword, Charteris states, "It is not, in any sense, a ghosted job, because I do not pretend to be the outright author". Charteris remained in editorial control of the books for the remainder of the series, which continued until 1983's Salvage for the Saint.

== Stories ==
The book consisted of the following stories:

1. "The Death Game" - based on the story by John Kruse, and the teleplay by Harry W. Junkin
2. "The Power Artist" - based on the teleplay by Kruse.
