= James Milner Phillips =

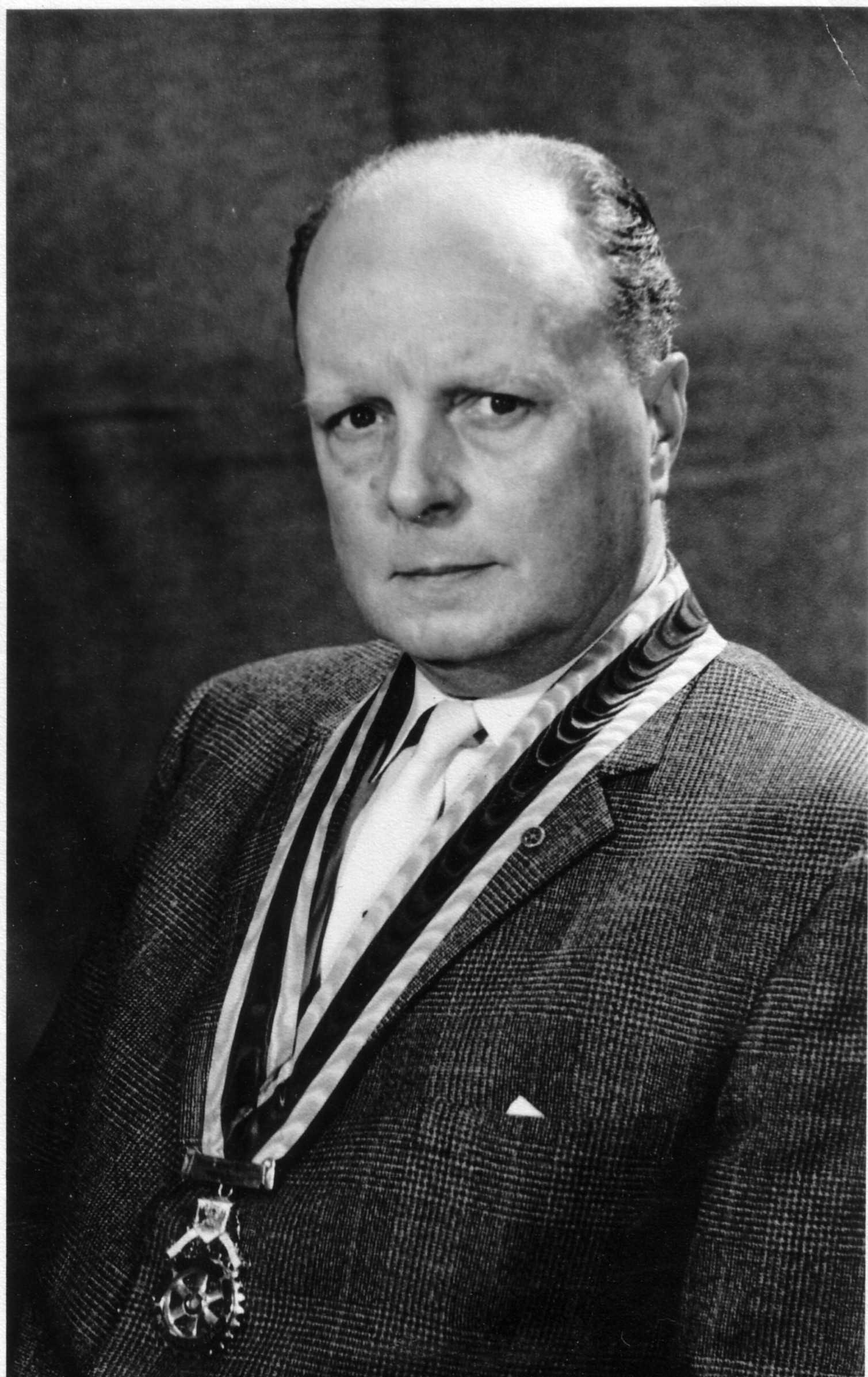
James Milner Phillips circa 1969

James Milner Phillips (1 July 1905, (Chelmsford) - December 1974 (Stow on the Wold)) was an English automotive engineer and businessman. He was managing director of Motor Panels Ltd, a major producer of steel bodywork for the UK car industry. He also supervised the building, testing and world land speed record attempts of Donald Campbell's Bluebird-Proteus CN7 which on 17 July 1964 became the fastest four-wheeled vehicle in the world.

== Motor Panels ==
From 1944, Phillips was managing director of Motor Panels, a Coventry based engineering firm who specialised in the production of pressings and assemblies for the motor trade for clients such as Alvis, Armstrong Siddeley, Austin Motor Company and Daimler. Motor Panels had been part of Jaguar Cars (then SS Cars) since the 1930s, but in the 1950s was sold to Rubery Owen. With the market for cars seen as unstable in the immediate post-war years, they shifted towards making cabs for trucks.

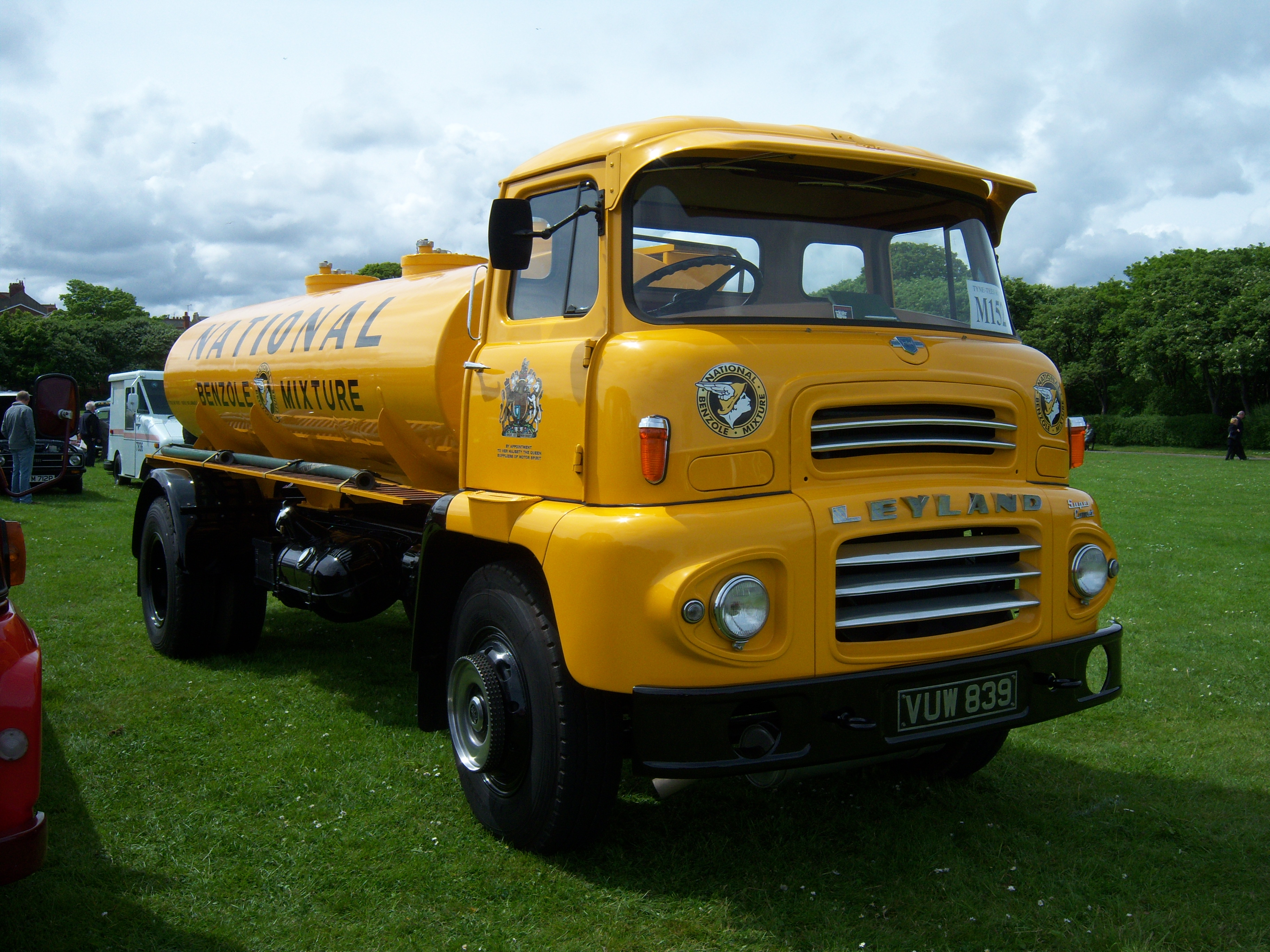
Leyland Comet, with LAD cab

Under Phillips' direction, Motor Panels developed the MP Mk II truck cab or 'LAD cab', from 'Leyland-Albion-Dodge'. Albion already purchased their cab bodywork from Motor Panels. A new design, the 'Vista Vue' cab was developed for them, with better visibility, ergonomics and driver comfort. Leyland, Albion's parent company, were also interested in using this design for their new generation Leyland Comet. Motor Panels developed this as the first successful 'club cab', which was shared across a number of truck manufacturers. Dodge UK were also looking for a panel supplier. Their previous 'parrot nose' Dodge had shared a bonneted cab design with the first Leyland Comet and the Ford Thames ET. This body was produced by Briggs Motor Bodies, who were purchased by Ford in 1953, leaving Dodge without a cab supplier. Dodge used the new LAD cab for their Dodge 300. The new cab was first shown at the 1958 Motor Show. It was used by Dodge until 1966, and Albion until 1976. Over 135,000 were produced in total.

== Bluebird ==
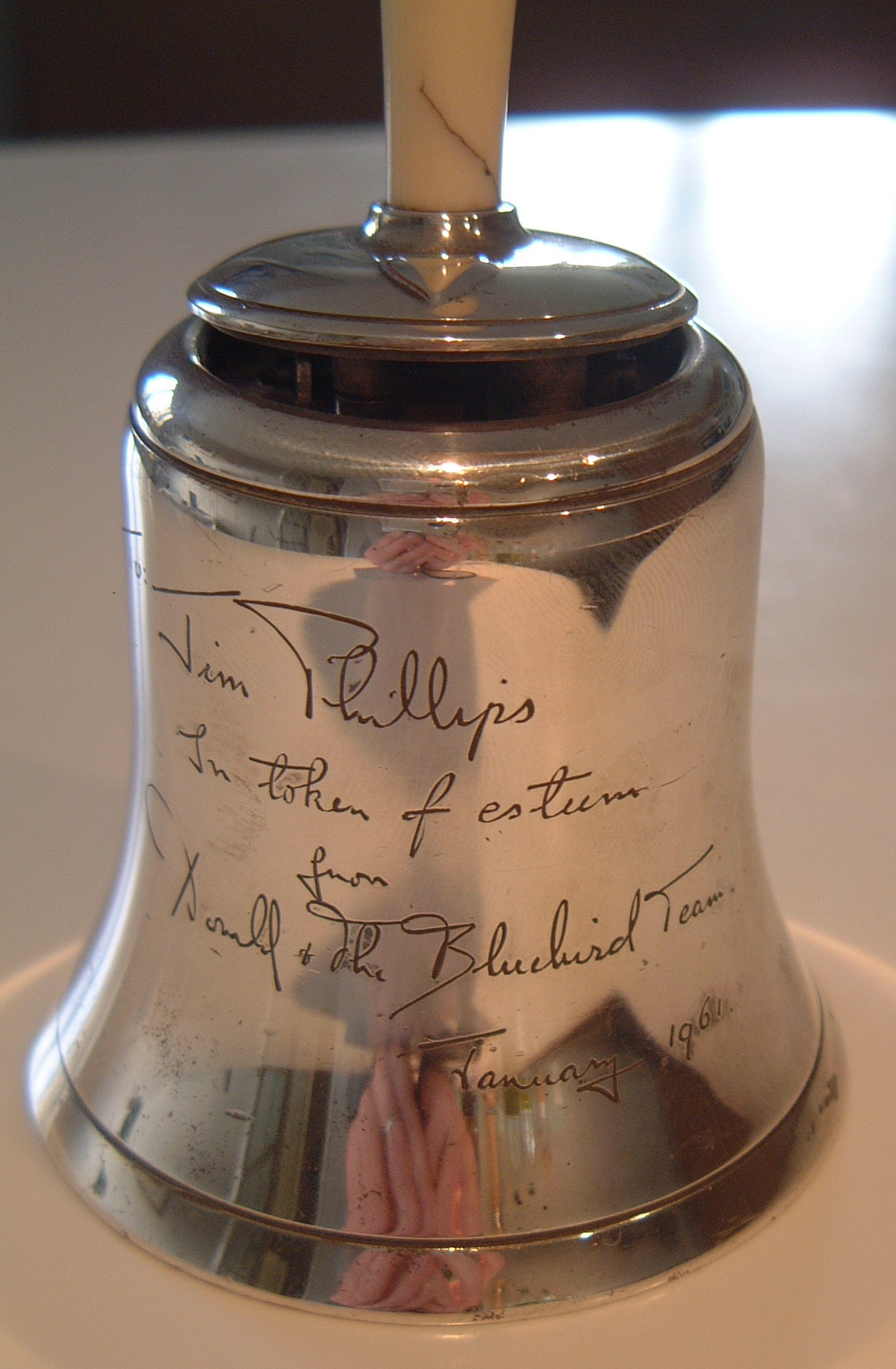
Inscribed "To Jim Phillips. In token of esteem from Donald and the Bluebird Team. January 1961

Motor Panels also built the gas turbine powered Bluebird CN7 car for Campbell. The first runs were made in 1960 Bonneville Salt Flats, but it was badly damaged in a high-speed crash and Campbell was seriously injured. The great strength of the car meant that the monocoque survived and had protected the powertrain components. Motor Panels set about rebuilding it and by the end of 1962 it was finished. Obvious changes included a new vertical stabiliser and a cockpit canopy which was now mostly solid with only a small windscreen, rather than the previous all-plastic bubble canopy. At the time it was the costliest single automobile in the history of motor sport at US$6m, equivalent to US$62 million today.

In early 1962 Phillips made a reconnaissance trip to Lake Eyre, South Australia and had been warned by a local sheep station owner that heavy rains were expected the following year following the twenty years of drought that had made the playa so suitable as a driving surface. On his return to England, Phillips advocated bringing the record attempt forward to 1962 however he was overruled by Donald Campbell who argued that there was not enough time and the challenge was deferred to 1963. The predicted torrential rain did fall, the lake became flooded and the 1963 land speed record attempt was abandoned. Weather also limited the speed achieved by the final runs in 1964, as the surface was too soft to allow the car's full performance.
