= Phyllis Brett Young =

Canadian novelist

- Born: Phyllis Brett; May 23, 1914; Toronto, Ontario, Canada
- Died: November 27, 1996 (aged 82); Orillia, Ontario, Canada
- Occupation: Writer
- Spouse: Douglas Young
- Children: 1
- Relatives: Marion Grace Brett (mother); George Sidney Brett (father)
- Writing career
- Pen name: Phyllis Brett Young; Kendal Young
- Language: English
- Notable works: Psyche (1959); The Torontonians (1960)

Phyllis Young (May 23, 1914 — November 27, 1996), known under the pen name Phyllis Brett Young, was an internationally bestselling Canadian novelist.

== Early life ==
Phyllis Young was born Phyllis Brett on May 23, 1914 in Toronto, Ontario, the daughter of British-Canadian parents Marion Grace Brett and George Sidney Brett. Her father was the head of the Department of Philosophy at the University of Toronto, and wrote the three-volume A History of Psychology (1912–21).

Young's childhood was split between winters attending public and private schools in Toronto, and summers in Muskoka. Young studied interior decorating at the Ontario College of Art (now OCAD University), but ended her studies and secretly wed her childhood sweetheart Douglas Young. Two years later, her public wedding would be called off when her father learned that she had already had a secret civil ceremony.

Young soon had a daughter, Valerie, and focused on family during the financial hardships of the 1930s.

== Career ==
Though Young was a steadfast wife and mother, she was eager to find something to do that would fill her time without interfering with her responsibilities. She considered dress designing, painting, and writing, with, in her own words, a "sewing machine in the bedroom, easel in the dining-room, and typewriter on the kitchen table where I could watch the stove". She eventually decided that writing would satisfy her the most.

When Douglas found work for a branch of the United Nations after World War II, the family relocated to Geneva, Switzerland. With her daughter now a teen in school, Young began writing her first novels. She planned to put the first away in a drawer with the rest of her writing, until her husband insisted that she submit it to an agent. Soon after the family moved back to Canada, her maiden name was added to her pen name, and Psyche by Phyllis Brett Young was published in 1959.

In her first year, Young was the author of two bestselling novels. Her second work, The Torontonians (1960), was published as she moved back to Toronto and became a fixture of the country's literary scene. Excerpts of the novel were published in the Chatelaine magazine, and that winter, she lost Canadian Press' Woman of the Year in Literature and Art to Marie-Claire Blais. Young told the Ottawa Citizen in 1960: "I write because I love Canada and I wish more and more people would write about Canada as it is today." Despite Young's attempts to keep the title The Torontonians, the book was reprinted abroad as Gift of Time, The Gift of Time, or The Commuters.

In the next two years, Young published two more novels. First was her most personal, the memoir Anything Could Happen!, which offered a collection of short stories detailing a summer in Muskoka as a child. It would be followed by her only novel under a pseudonym, The Ravine, written under the name Kendal Young. Written as an experiment, Young asked for it to be printed under a pseudonym. Her publisher obliged, but still used Young's real name in the marketing and press, as well as the pages of the book itself.

After the rapid-fire release of Young's first four books, her pace slowed for her final two. First she re-purposed the Medieval legend of Undine to tell the story of a woman battling the ghost of her new husband's ex-wife in Undine (1964). Five years later, she released her final book, a murder mystery titled A Question of Judgment.

== Film adaptations ==
Shortly after the release of Psyche, English director Victor Saville obtained the film rights. In 1961, the United Press International distributed news that he would direct the adaptation, and Susannah York would star. The project never came to fruition, as Saville stopped making films the same year.

The Ravine was adapted into a film, renamed Assault, a 1971 British pulp film was adapted by John Kruse and directed by Sidney Hayers.

== Later years ==
As her daughter wrote in the foreword to The Torontonians re-release in 2007, after her last novel, "family needs took precedence over personal fulfillment, and unfortunately she never got back to her writing". Some of Young's books were republished in the 1970s, and then the author fell into obscurity until her first two novels were posthumously re-released by McGill–Queen's University Press.

== Bibliography ==
- Psyche (1959)
- The Torontonians (1960)
- Anything Could Happen! (1961)
- The Ravine (1962) (as Kendal Young)
- Undine (1964)
- A Question of Judgment (1969)
