= Sea Fury (1958 film) =

- Directed by: Cy Endfield
- Written by: John Kruse; Cy Endfield (as C. Raker Endfield)
- Produced by: Benjamin Fisz executive Earl St John
- Starring: Stanley Baker; Victor McLaglen; Luciana Paluzzi
- Cinematography: Reginald H. Wyer
- Edited by: Arthur Stevens
- Music by: Philip Green
- Production company: S. Benjamin Fisz Productions (as Aqua)
- Distributed by: J. Arthur Rank Film Distributors
- Release date: 26 August 1958 (London)
- Running time: 97 minutes
- Country: United Kingdom
- Language: English

Sea Fury is a 1958 British action film directed by Cy Endfield and starring Stanley Baker, Victor McLaglen, Luciana Paluzzi and Grégoire Aslan. It was written by John Kruse and Endfield (as C. Raker Endfield). It was the last film appearance from Victor McLaglen.

== Plot ==
A qualified First Mate, Abel Hewson, arrives in a Spanish seaside town looking for work on local ships salvaging still-afloat abandoned ships. Abel Hewson and Captain Bellew become love rivals for 18-year-old Josita.

Both men go on a dangerous mission to salvage a floating wreck carrying explosives which will detonate on contact with any water. Their rivalry comes between them and their work. The tug-boat crew, especially Gorman, also resent Abel Hewson being made their First Mate. The crew are also competing against another tug-boat operator, Captain Mulder, for the salvage prize.

== Cast ==
- Stanley Baker as Abel Hewson
- Victor McLaglen as Captain Bellew
- Luciana Paluzzi as Josita
- Grégoire Aslan as Fernando
- Francis de Wolff as Mulder
- David Oxley as Blanco
- George Murcell as Loudon
- Percy Herbert as Walker
- Rupert Davies as Bosun
- Robert Shaw as Gorman
- Roger Delgado as Salgado
- Barry Foster as Vincent
- Joe Robinson as Henrik
- Dermot Walsh as Captain Kelso
- Richard Pearson as Kershaw
- Fred Johnson as Doc
- Jack Taylor as donkeyman

== Production ==
Stanley Baker, Cy Endfield and produced Ben Fisz had previously teamed on Hell Drivers. "There is plenty of natural drama in the every-day jobs of men with physical contact with reality," said Endfield. "There have been a lot of dramas on the rarified psychological plain, but with the survival jobs, the basic jobs, the contact with reality is reduced to simple, basic terms. Cinematic."

Fisz said, "I think you get much more drama if you go down to the gutter. And if you go down to the gutter you might as well go all the way."

The film was one of several movies financed by Rank around this time aimed at the international market. This prompted the casting of American Victor McLaglen and Italian Luciana Paluzzi.

The film was shot in early 1959 at Pinewood Studios and on location on the Costa Brava in Spain, where Rank had filmed The Spanish Gardener. Filming finished 3 April 1958 at Pinewood Studios.

== Critical reception ==
The Monthly Film Bulletin wrote: "Three quarters of this film are taken up with innuendo, leers from Victor McLaglen, snarls from Stanley Baker, and coy pouting from Luciana Paluzzi, who is given some scenes of keyhole salacity and little else to act. The last fraction of the obscure story, Stanley Baker's struggle with a drum of sodium, allows the elements to take over, but by then it is almost too late to revive the moribund plot."

Kinematograph Weekly awarded Paluzzi a "newcomer of the year" award. However the film did not make the list of the movies "in the money" at the British box office in 1958.

Variety called it an "entertaining blend of sea adventure and romantic intrigue on land. There are very sound performances, a fascinating Spanish background" although "it takes a long while for the sea thrills to work up and the doings on land tend to dominate too much of the film. Nevertheless, when the big sea sequence does come it fairly bursts on to the screen and will have audiences biting nails with tension.

The Daily Telegraph called it "magnificent cinema, superbly photographed... well worth a visit."

The Evening Standard wrote "the conclusion of this plot is predictable a long time from the end. But it contains a furious seascape of a climax."

The Daily Mirror called it "an amusing hour and a half's entertainment."

Filmink called it "a splendid melodrama... a lot of fun to watch" though noted its lack of commercial success, wondering "maybe it needed a war background, which we also think would have helped Rank’s earlier sea melodrama, Passage Home."

Sky Movies wrote, "A host of good actors, including Robert Shaw and Barry Foster, add meat to the minor roles in this tough action film."
