= The Saint and the People Importers =

1971 novel by Leslie Charteris

- 1st edition (1971 paperback)
- Author: Fleming Lee and Leslie Charteris, based on the teleplay by Donald James
- Language: English
- Series: The Saint
- Genre: Mystery novel
- Publisher: Hodder & Stoughton
- Publication date: 1971
- Publication place: United Kingdom
- Media type: Print (Hardback & Paperback)
- ISBN: 0-340-15078-5
- OCLC: 59141753
- Preceded by: The Saint in Pursuit
- Followed by: Catch the Saint

The Saint and the People Importers is the title of a 1971 mystery novel featuring the character of Simon Templar, alias "The Saint". The novel is credited to Leslie Charteris, who created the Saint in 1928, but the book was actually co-authored by Fleming Lee. It is a novelization of the 1968 episode "The People Importers" from the 1962-69 TV series, The Saint, originally written by Donald James. The episode sprang from an original outline by Lee, though this was discarded by the time the story hit TV screens. For the novelisation Lee went back to the original premise.

Some sources such as the Saintly Bible website, list Charteris as co-author of this book, although he did serve in an editorial capacity on all releases issued during this period. For the first time in more than 30 years, the British edition (by Hodder and Stoughton) predated the American release. It was also the first Saint book to be released in paperback first, although hardcover editions followed. The book was first published in the United States by The Crime Club in 1972.

== Plot summary ==
This novel captures some flavour of the early-seventies English society by thrusting its titular hero against the immigration rackets exploiting the masses of underprivileged Asian workers (in this case, Pakistani) during the times when England "called the Empire home". The action starts when, getting in a cab in London, Simon Templar spots a particularly lurid headline on the frontpage of a newspaper forgotten by some previous customer, describing the horrible death of a Pakistani immigrant in Soho.

== Publication ==
Fleming Lee wrote the book's plot in 1967, and Leslie Charteris edited the entire text. A television screenplay originally inspired the book's plot. The British publisher Hodder & Stoughton planned to achieve the highest possible sales by issuing the initial release in paperback in April 1971. Publishing in paperback was a winning move as the book sold quickly and garnered favourable reviews.

On 21 November 1970, Charteris asked Doubleday's Julia Coopersmith to publish the book. She did not feel compelled to move forward with a publishing deal as she thought the book lacked the intrigue needed to hold the reader's interest and thought the action scenes were underwhelming. She turned down the book in a 11 December 1970 leter. Charteris penned a response on 5 January 1971 saying that it "may not be the greatest of the Saint book. But it is certainly better than a number of others which sold satisfactory". He said that if Doubleday did not publish the book, he would never submit a book to the publisher in the future as he did not want to be burdened with having to shop manuscripts to other publishers under the shadow of Doubleday rejection. Coopersmith replied that although she opposed bringing the book to market, the publisher would release it so that they could carry on with publishing his writings. The book ended up achieving commercial success.

== Reception ==
The book received positive reviews. It was reviewed in The Sunday Times on 16 September 1973. A reviewer from The Spectator wrote, "Charteris now merely supervises Saint stories. The Saint and the People Importers is one such effort, and most of the zip, it has to be confessed, is gone." The Bolton News found the book to be a "topical and entertaining story about the smuggling of immigrants with a touch of murder".

Lancashire Telegraph reviewer Geoffrey Rumney wrote, "And yet there's a quality of Saintliness missing somewhere, an absence of the freshness that made Simon Templar the hero of every schoolboy who had grown out of G. A. Henty and Bulldog Drummond." Lenore Glen Offord of the San Francisco Chronicle called the book "another semi-synthetic Saint novel, full-length this time".

== Works cited ==
- Barer, Burl (1993). The Saint: A Complete History in Print, Radio, Film and Television of Leslie Charteris' Robin Hood of Modern Crime, Simon Templar, 1928–1992. Jefferson, North Carolina: McFarland & Company. ISBN 0-7864-1680-7 – via Internet Archive.
