= The Saint and the Hapsburg Necklace =

1976 novel by Leslie Charteris

- First edition
- Author: Christopher Short, based on characters by Leslie Charteris
- Language: English
- Series: The Saint
- Genre: Mystery novel
- Publisher: The Crime Club
- Publication date: 1976
- Publication place: United Kingdom
- Media type: Print (Hardback & Paperback)
- Pages: 186 pp
- ISBN: 0-385-11226-2
- OCLC: 1859650
- Dewey Decimal: 823/.9/12
- LC Class: PZ3.C3855 Le3 PR6005.H348
- Preceded by: Catch the Saint
- Followed by: Send for the Saint

The Saint and the Hapsburg Necklace is the title of a 1976 mystery novel featuring the character of Simon Templar, alias "The Saint". The novel is written by Christopher Short, but per the custom at this time, the author credit on the cover goes to Leslie Charteris, who created the Saint in 1928, and who served in an editorial capacity.

The book was first published in the United States by The Crime Club, and was followed thereafter by a United Kingdom edition from Hodder and Stoughton. A later paperback edition by Coronet Books was a tie-in with the then-current Return of the Saint television series.

Although the usual German spelling of the name is Habsburg, all editions of this book use the older English "Hapsburg" spelling, still in vogue when the book was written.

== Plot summary ==
On the eve of World War II the redoubtable Simon Templar (better known as THE SAINT) finds himself in the imperial city of Vienna, his attentions divided between a very sensuous countess and some legendary diamonds — both of which he is trying to keep out of Nazi hands.

Since the days of the Holy Roman Empire, the legendary Hapsburg Necklace has been guarded by members of the Austrian nobility. But never before has it had so beautiful a protector as one Francesca, the Countess Malffy (also known as Frankie). And never before has it been so in danger of being stolen.

For its hiding place, the Malffy ancestral manor, has recently been occupied by a new tenant — the Gestapo.

And as THE SAINT and Frankie plan a mission to retrieve the necklace, it becomes increasingly apparent that the Germans are not their only adversaries. Also vying for the crown jewels is a most unpredictable eccentric who is every bit a match for Simon Templar.
