= Echo of Barbara =

1960 British film directed by Sidney Hayers

- Directed by: Sidney Hayers
- Written by: John Kruse
- Based on: novel Echo of Barbara by Jonathan Burke
- Produced by: Julian Wintle; Leslie Parkyn
- Starring: Mervyn Johns; Maureen Connell with Paul Stassino
- Cinematography: Michael Reed
- Edited by: Tristam Cones
- Music by: Davide Castrati
- Production company: Independent Artists
- Distributed by: Anglo-Amalgamated Film Distributors (UK)
- Release date: 1960
- Running time: 58 minutes
- Country: United Kingdom
- Language: English

Echo of Barbara is a 1960 British crime film directed by Sidney Hayers, and starring Mervyn Johns and Maureen Connell. It was written by John Kruse based on the 1959 novel of the same title by Jonathan Burke. It was one of several crime films Hayers made for Anglo-Amalgamated.

== Plot ==
Soho stripper Paula Brown poses as Barbara, the missing daughter of crooked Sam Roscoe, hoping to uncover the whereabouts of stolen money.

== Cast ==
- Mervyn Johns as Sam Roscoe
- Maureen Connell as Paula Brown
- Paul Stassino as Caledonia
- Ronald Hines as Mike Roscoe
- Tom Bell as Ben
- Brian Peck as Ted
- Eddie Leslie as aide
- Beatrice Varley as Mrs. Roscoe
- John Abineri as Rankin
- Diana Potter as Pam

== Critical reception ==
The Monthly Film Bulletin wrote: "An intricate and implausible impersonation story, made without style and falling back on sleazy and violent backgrounds and incidents to whip up some artificial excitement."

Kine Weekly wrote: "There are some seamy and violent passages, but a strong human interest, smoothly developed by Maureen Connell as the heroine, preserves essential balance. It's potent and palatable fare. ... The picture opens in a striptease joint and has a few other sexy moments, but sensationalism is a means to a suspenseful and morally sound climax. Maureen Connell meets all acting demands and is easy on the eyes as Paula, Mervyn Johns scores as Sam, and Paul Stassino and Ronald Hines thoroughly convince as the ruthless Caledonia and two-timing Mike respectively. Its direction, too, has punch, the feminine angle is strong, and its backgrounds are suitably varied."

Allmovie called it "a better-than-usual British programmer, entertaining despite its surplus of unpleasant leading characters."
