= John Burke (author) =

English writer (1922–2011)

John Frederick Burke
- Born: 8 March 1922; Rye, East Sussex, England
- Died: 20 September 2011 (aged 89); Kirkcudbright, Scotland
- Occupation: Novelist
- Writing career
- Genre: Horror

John Frederick Burke (8 March 1922 – 20 September 2011) was an English writer of novels and short stories.

He also wrote under the pen names J. F. Burke, Jonathan Burke, Jonathan George, Robert Miall, Martin Sands, Owen Burke, Sara Morris, Roger Rougiere, and Joanna Jones; and co-wrote with his wife Jean Burke under the pen name Harriet Esmond.

== Biography ==
Burke was born on 8 March 1922 in Rye, Sussex, and educated at Holt High School, Liverpool, now known as Childwall Academy. He served in the Royal Air Force, Royal Electrical and Mechanical Engineers, and the Royal Marines during the war.

After working for the publishers Museum Press and the Books for Pleasure Group, he was a Public Relations and Publications Executive for Shell (1959–63) and Story Editor for Twentieth Century-Fox (1963–65) before becoming a full-time writer in 1966.

Writing as Jonathan Burke, J. F. Burke and John Burke, he produced several suspense stories and psychological thrillers, including the Atlantic Award in Literature winning Swift Summer (1949; by J. F. Burke), These Haunted Streets (1950), Chastity House (1952), Echo of Barbara (1959; filmed in 1960) and The Twisted Tongues (1964). Some of his other novels appeared under the pseudonyms of Joanna Jones, Sara Morris, Jonathan George and Owen Burke.

He achieved equal popularity with his science fiction short stories in magazines like New Worlds and New Frontiers, and the best of these were collected in Alien Landscapes (1955). His first two SF novels, The Dark Gateway (1953) and The Echoing Worlds (1954), both dealt with the theme of parallel universes; and Pursuit Through Time (1956) described an attempt to change the course of history while time-travelling into the past.

For more than thirty years Burke novelised a large number of stage plays, film and TV scripts, notably John Osborne's The Entertainer and Look Back in Anger, The Angry Silence (all 1960), Flame in the Streets (1961), The Lion of Sparta (1961; the film was released as The 300 Spartans), The Boys (1962), The System (1963), A Hard Day's Night (1964), Dr. Terror's House of Horrors (1965), That Magnificent Air Race (1965; the film was released as Those Magnificent Men in Their Flying Machines), The Hammer Horror Omnibus (1966/7; two volumes), Till Death Us Do Part, Privilege (both 1967), Smashing Time, Ian Fleming's Chitty Chitty Bang Bang (both 1968), Moon Zero Two (1969), Luke's Kingdom (1976), King and Castle (1986) and a series of The Bill novels, beginning in 1985.

A Hard Day's Night came close to not being published at all. The then Director of Pan Books, Clarence Paget, saw the Beatles as nothing but a passing fad, and it took Burke and many of Pan's office workers – all Beatles fans – to persuade Paget otherwise. The book went on to sell 1.25 million copies.

Several other tie-ins appeared under the names of Martin Sands and Robert Miall, including Maroc 7 (1967), The Best House in London (1969), two Jason King thrillers in 1972, and also UFO and its sequel UFO 2 (1970/1971).

Burke also wrote the source story for the 1967 cult horror film The Sorcerers. The screenplay has now been published in a limited edition of 500 copies. Burke also contributed to the TV series Late Night Horror (BBC, 1968), Tales of Unease (LWT, 1970) and The Frighteners (LWT, 1972).

Among Burke's later novels were a series featuring the Victorian psychic investigator and occult detective Dr Alex Caspian (a stage magician by day, assisted by his wife, Bronwen), and a further three Victorian Gothic suspense novels (by "Harriet Esmond") written in collaboration with his wife Jean. These were always carefully researched, and explored the regions described in these stories.

He edited a trilogy of books under the "Unease" banner: Tales of Unease (1966), More Tales of Unease (1969) and New Tales of Unease (1976). Several ghost and horror stories appeared in the Pan "Ghost Book" series, the Pan Book of Horror Stories, New Terrors, The Mammoth Book of Best New Horror and his short stories were collected in the Ash Tree Press volume We've Been Waiting For You (2000), which included his most celebrated story, "And Cannot Come Again".

He wrote two original short stories that were subsequently published in Johnny Mains's tribute book Back From The Dead: The Legacy of the Pan Book of Horror Stories (2010), was interviewed at length about his tie-in career for Bedabbled! magazine (2011) and was in talks to publish a novel that began life in the 1950s and was rejuvenated in early 2011. Robert Hale also published five novels in the last decade: Stalking Widow (2000), The Second Strain (2002), Wrong Turnings (2004), Hang Time (2007) and The Merciless Dead (2008).

Burke also wrote over twenty non-fiction titles, including several travel books for Batsford: Suffolk (1971), Sussex (1974), English Villages (1975), Czechoslovakia (1976), Look Back on England (1980) and The English Inn (1981).

In 1985 he reached the semi-finals in TV's Mastermind; his wife Jean also reached the semi-finals two years later.

== Bibliography ==
=== Novelisations ===
- The Entertainer (1960)
- Look Back in Anger (1960)
- Flame in the Streets (1961)
- The Lion of Sparta (1961)
- The Angry Silence (1961)
- The Boys (1962)
- Private Potter (1962)
- Guilty Party (1963)
- The Man Who Finally Died (1963)
- The World Ten Times Over (1963)
- A Hard Day's Night (1964)
- The System (1964)
- Dr Terror's House of Horrors (1965)
- That Magnificent Air Race (1965)
- The Power Game (1966)
- The Trap (1966)
- The Hammer Horror Omnibus (1966)
- The Second Hammer Horror Film Omnibus (1967)
- The Jokers (as Martin Sands) (1967)
- Maroc 7 (as Martin Sands) (1967)
- Privilege (1967)
- Till Death Us Do Part (1967)
- Smashing Time (1968)
- Chitty Chitty Bang Bang (1968)
- The Bliss of Mrs Blossom (1968)
- Moon Zero Two (1969)
- The Smashing Bird I Used to Know (1969)
- The Best House in London (as Martin Sands) (1969)
- All the Right Noises (1970)
- Strange Report (1970)
- UFO (as Robert Miall) (1970)
- UFO 2 (as Robert Miall) (1971)
- Dad's Army (1971)
- Jason King (as Robert Miall) (1972)
- Kill Jason King! (as Robert Miall) (1972)
- The Adventurer (as Robert Miall) (1973)
- The Protectors (as Robert Miall) (1973)
- Luke's Kingdom (1975)
- Prince Regent (1977)
- The Bill (1985)
- The Fourth Floor (1986)
- King and Castle (1986)
- The Bill 2 (1987)
- The Bill 3 (1989)
- The Bill 4 (1990)
- The Bill 5 (1991)
- The Bill 6 (1992)
- The Bill 1, 2, 3 (1992)
- London's Burning (1992)
- London's Burning: Blue Watch Blues (1995)
- London's Burning: Flashpoint (1995)

=== Dr Alex Caspian series ===
- The Devil's Footsteps (1976)
- The Black Charade (1977)
- Ladygrove (1978)
