= The Saint and the Fiction Makers =

1968 novel by Leslie Charteris

- First UK edition
- Author: Fleming Lee; John Kruse (teleplay); Leslie Charteris (characters)
- Language: English
- Series: The Saint
- Genre: Mystery novel
- Publisher: The Crime Club
- Publication date: 1968
- Publication place: United Kingdom
- Media type: Print (Hardback & Paperback)
- Pages: 211 pp
- Preceded by: The Saint Returns
- Followed by: The Saint Abroad

The Saint and the Fiction Makers (some editions use the hyphenated form "Fiction-Makers") is the title of a 1968 mystery novel featuring the character of Simon Templar, alias "The Saint".

The novel is credited to Leslie Charteris, who created the Saint in 1928, but the book was actually authored by Fleming Lee and is adapted from a teleplay by John Kruse written for a two-part episode of The Saint, "The Fiction Makers", which first aired in December 1968 and was later released as a theatrical film. As with other Saint books released during this period, Charteris served in an editorial capacity.

The novel was first published in the United States by The Crime Club in 1968 (possibly before the episodes aired), and in the United Kingdom the following year by Hodder and Stoughton. The movie stars Roger Moore as Simon Templar with Sylvia Syms.

== Plot summary ==
Simon Templar is hired by a friend in the book publishing trade to protect one of his authors, a secretive recluse called Amos Klein who writes a popular series of spy novels.

When he arrives at Klein's house in the country, he hears a woman's screams and several gunshots. Rushing to the rescue, he finds a woman tied up and gripping a revolver behind her back. He discovers that she is "Amos Klein", a woman who adopted a male pen name to increase sales of her novels. She explains that she has to be able to do everything her character in the novels does and that she was just doing some research. The pair are soon kidnapped by a group of people who claim to be members of S.W.O.R.D., the evil organization from Amos Klein's novels. Their leader, "Warlock", the mastermind of the group, mistakenly assumes that Simon Templar is Amos Klein and that the woman is his secretary. The kidnappers want Amos Klein to plot a grandiose heist.
