= Assault (film) =

1971 British thriller directed by Sidney Hayers

- Theatrical poster
- Directed by: Sidney Hayers
- Written by: John Kruse
- Based on: The Ravine by Kendal Young
- Produced by: George H. Brown; Peter Rogers
- Starring: Suzy Kendall; Frank Finlay; Freddie Jones; Lesley-Anne Down
- Cinematography: Ken Hodges
- Edited by: Anthony Palk
- Music by: Eric Rogers
- Production company: George H. Brown Productions
- Distributed by: J. Arthur Rank Film Distributors
- Release date: 11 February 1971
- Running time: 91 minutes
- Country: United Kingdom
- Language: English
- Budget: $550,000

Assault (also known as The Creepers, U.S. title: In the Devil's Garden) is a 1971 British thriller film directed by Sidney Hayers and starring Suzy Kendall, Frank Finlay, Freddie Jones, and Lesley-Anne Down. The screenplay was by John Kruse based on the 1962 novel The Ravine by Phyllis Bretty Young (as Kendal Young) and tells about a police attempt to track down a dangerous rapist/killer on the loose.

== Plot ==
Schoolgirl Tessa Hurst is raped on her way home from school. She is so traumatised she is unable to speak, despite the efforts of Dr Lomax. Some weeks later, another girl, Susan, is raped and killed.

Art teacher Julie West stumbles upon Susan's corpse when she is with some other pupils and glimpses the killer, who has glowing eyes and demonic appearance. Julie decides in conjunction with a reporter to offer herself up as bait for the killer. Sgt Milton is assigned to be Julie's bodyguard.

Possible suspects include Leslie Sanford, husband of the owner of the school, Lomax, and Bartell, head of the hospital where Lomax works.

The killer is revealed and is electrocuted.

== Cast ==
- Suzy Kendall as Julie West
- Frank Finlay as Det. Chief Supt. Velyan
- Freddie Jones as Reporter
- James Laurenson as Dr Greg Lomax
- Lesley-Anne Down as Tessa Hurst
- Tony Beckley as Leslie Sanford
- Anthony Ainley as Mr. Bartell
- Dilys Hamlett as Mrs. Sanford
- James Cosmo as Det. Sgt. Beale
- Patrick Jordan as Sgt. Milton
- Allan Cuthbertson as coroner
- Anabel Littledale as Susan Miller
- Tom Chatto as police doctor
- Kit Taylor as doctor
- Jan Butlin as day receptionist
- William Hoyland as chemist in hospital
- John Swindells as desk sergeant
- Jill Carey as night receptionist
- David Essex as young man in chemist shop
- Valerie Shute as girl in chemist shop
- John Stone as fire chief
- Siobhan Quinlan as Jenny Greenaway
- Marianne Stone as matron
- Janet Lynn as girl in library

== Original novel The Ravine ==
The film was based on a 1962 novel The Ravine by Kendal Young, a pseudonym used by author Phyllis Bret Young when she wrote thrillers.

The Daily Herald called it "slightly agog with adjectives... but otherwise a clever piece of tension writing." The Ottawa Journal praised its "slick horror suspense".

== Production ==
Peter Rodgers produced the Carry On series for the Rank Organisation and made an arrangement to produce other films for them "thrillers and romantic subjects".

Filming started 22 June 1970 at Pinewood Studios. It was the first major film for both James Laurenson and Lesley Anne Down.

== Reception ==
The Monthly Film Bulletin wrote: "An unremarkable throwback to those Fifties thrillers whose elements have subsequently been scattered through any number of television dramas, with just a little more gloss and amateur psychologising than before. The film makes few demands on its actors, though Frank Finlay plays his familiar dour policeman with precision; and the tracking down of the murderer is more a matter of simple mathematics than of any developed logic in either plot or characters. ... The film's only striking effect is its pummelling method of keeping the psychopath's identity a secret in the early scenes of the rape by casting the camera – and the spectator – in his role."

The Guardian called it "a straightforward British thriller whose only concession to modernity is nice colour and a bit more bra-tearing than was once permissible. Otherwise, it remains firmly rooted in the B picture traditions of the fifties."

The Evening Standard said "barring a bit of bra groping it's the kind of film they were making years ago."

Richard Gold of Variety called it an "unpretentious action offering ... which, with the right companion film, should make a successful double-bill ... the type of film which used to fulfil a useful function in earlier screen days and can well do nowadays."

The Radio Times Guide to Films gave the film 2/5 stars, writing: "Apart from its rather leery approach to the subject matter, this is a resolutely old-fashioned whodunnit, complete with a gallery of not-so-likely suspects, a series of mini-skirted would-be victims and a baffled cop played by Frank Finlay."

Leslie Halliwell said: "Old-fashioned police mystery with new-fangled shock treatment. Routine excitements." Filmink wrote "it’s the sort of movie that feels as though it wants to be a slasher/giallo and should have been that, but didn’t go through with it."

The Ottawa Journal claimed "you will enjoy it for its skilled horror suspense, or you will reject it for its brutal motivation."
