= Tales of Unease =

1970 British drama television series

- Opening titles
- Genre: Drama
- Country of origin: United Kingdom
- Original language: English
- No. of series: 1
- No. of episodes: 7

Original release
- Network: London Weekend Television
- Release: 30 October – 11 December 1970

Tales of Unease is a 1970 British supernatural drama series based on a series of three horror story anthology books edited by John Burke.

The series was made by London Weekend Television and ran for seven episodes.

== Episode list ==
1. "Ride, Ride" (written by Michael Hastings). A young man goes dancing and gives a young woman a lift home.
2. "Calculated Nightmare" (written by John Burke). Two company executives work late at the office the evening before an announcement is made about redundancies.
3. "The Black Goddess" (written by Jack Griffith). Welsh miners are trapped when the pit collapses.
4. "It's Too Late Now" (written by Andrea Newman). A woman teaches her husband a lesson.
5. "Superstitious Ignorance" (written by Michael Cornish, father of Joe Cornish). A couple view a house with a view to its purchase and modernisation.
6. "Bad Bad Jo Jo" (written by James Leo Herlihy). A flamboyant author meets two of his greatest fans.
7. "The Old Banger" (written by Richardson Morgan) A young couple decide to buy a new car.

== Home media ==
The series was released on a UK DVD by Network Distributing in March 2023 and reissued by Spirit Entertainment in December 2024..
