= Roy Henry Bowyer-Yin =

Anglican clergyman

- Born: 7 October 1910; British Singapore
- Died: 4 December 2010 (age 100); Singapore
- Education: King's College
- Occupations: Clergyman, Missionary, Teacher of mathematics
- Employer(s): King's College, S. Thomas' College, Mt Lavinia
- Known for: Services to choral music drama and literature
- Title: Reverend Canon
- Father: Yin Suat Chuan
- Relatives: Leslie Charteris (brother)

Roy Henry Bowyer-Yin (7 October 1910 – 4 December 2010) was an Anglican clergyman known for introducing a tradition of choral music to Ceylon (now Sri Lanka). He left an abiding musical presence in Sri Lanka.

== Early life and family ==
Roy Bowyer-Yin was born in Singapore 1910 the son of Dr. Yin Suat Chuan and his wife Lydia Florence Bowyer. He was the younger brother of Leslie Charteris. He later attended a preparatory school in Surrey and in 1924 received a scholarship to Marlborough College, Wiltshire. At Marlborough he established a reputation as a competent pianist and organist and a love of church music.

== King's College ==
Bowyer-Yin joined King's College, Cambridge as a Maths undergraduate in 1929, but later changed to Law and finally to history graduating with honours in 1932. He attended a theological college at Cuddesdon and was ordained in the King's College Chapel, Cambridge on 18 October 1933. It was the first ordination to be held in the college. At the age of 23 on 7 October 1933, he assumed duties as Chaplain of King's at the youngest permitted age for ordination to the diaconate.

== Hurstpierpoint College ==
He subsequently served as Chaplain at Hurstpierpoint College in Sussex from 1937 to 1945, where he also taught mathematics.

== S. Thomas’ College ==
In 1946 in what was to have been a six-month stint (while Canon Foster was on leave in England), he became Chaplain and Master of the Choir at S. Thomas' College, Mount Lavinia, in Ceylon (now Sri Lanka) when Canon R.S.de Saram was warden, where he stayed until 1962. He is credited with composing the song "The School by the Sea".

"You'll always remember, wherever you may be;
the school of your boyhood, the school by the sea.
And you'll always remember the friendships fine and free,
that you made at S.Thomas', the school by the sea.

He was considered a talented pianist and an authority on J. S. Bach, Russell Dias-Jayasinghe refers to him leaving behind an abiding musical presence as a legacy. He was described as legendary by de Silva. His contributions were summarised as "music, mathematics and the ministry". He recruited and trained proteges (Russell Bartholomeusz (in music) and Rev LGB Fernando (music and teaching mathematics)). The Roy Bowyer-Yin Choir fund and a memorial scholarship were established in his memory. His love for rugby was well known as he was observed to run along the touchlines in his cassock urging the school team on and is commemorated by the award annually of the Bowyer-Yin prize for place kicking in Rugby.

== Music ==
Bowyer-Yin is credited with introducing and fostering choral music in the wider community as well as in schools. He produced Purcell's Dido and Aeneas for a public performance at the Lionel Wendt Theatre and formed a madrigal group which gave its initial public performance in 1955.

== Singapore ==
He was a vicar at St Hilda's Church in Katong from 1972 to 1975, and was a resident assistant priest (1975–80), Canon (1980–82) and Canon Precentor (1982–84) at St Andrew's Cathedral, Singapore.

== Retirement ==
Bowyer-Yin adopted Peter Ang, one of his students at the University of Malaya. He died at their home aged 100. A commemorative compact disc of his works was published posthumously by well wishers and past pupils.
