= Leyland Comet =

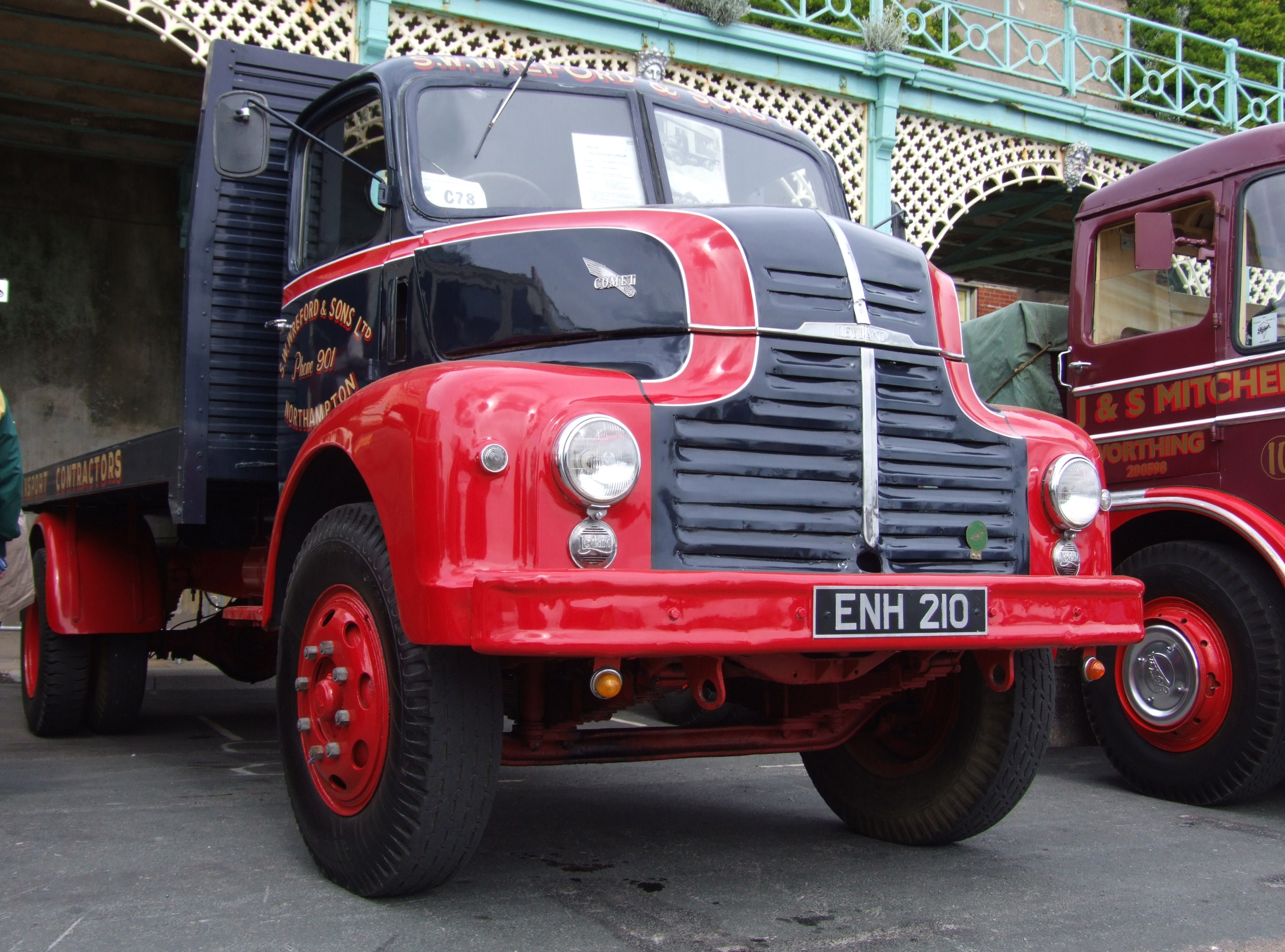
- 1954 Leyland Comet 90

Overview
- Manufacturer: Leyland Trucks
- Also called: Leyland Super Comet; Leyland Super Comet '90'
- Production: 1947–2015

Body and chassis
- Class: Medium-duty
- Body style: Bonneted truck; Cabover truck; Bus

The Leyland Comet was a long running badge used by Leyland for a series of trucks (and the occasional bus) intended mainly for export markets. The name lives on in India, where Ashok Leyland still uses the badge today.

== First generation ==
The semi-bonneted original Comet was first shown in December 1947. While intended mainly for export, it was also sold in the home market. The wheelbase is 17.5 ft (5.3 m) and the gross weight 8.75 long tons (8,890 kg). A coach model seating 33, sharing the same front design, appeared in 1948. The cab was built by Briggs Motor Bodies and was shared with the Ford Thames ET6 and Dodge 100. Ford purchased Briggs in 1953, meaning Leyland (and Dodge) were forced to develop new cabs. The original engines were a 75 hp (56 kW) diesel or a 100 hp (75 kW) petrol unit; the petrol version was rarely seen in Britain.

In 1950 the diesel engine was updated to the new 5.76 litre Leyland O.350 unit, now with 90 hp (67 kW). Maximum weight was increased to 12 long tons (12,200 kg); models for tropical zones received a considerably lower rating. In 1955 the maximum power output was increased again, to 100 hp (75 kW) at 2200 rpm, as the new O.350 Mk. III engine replaced the previous version.

== Second generation ==
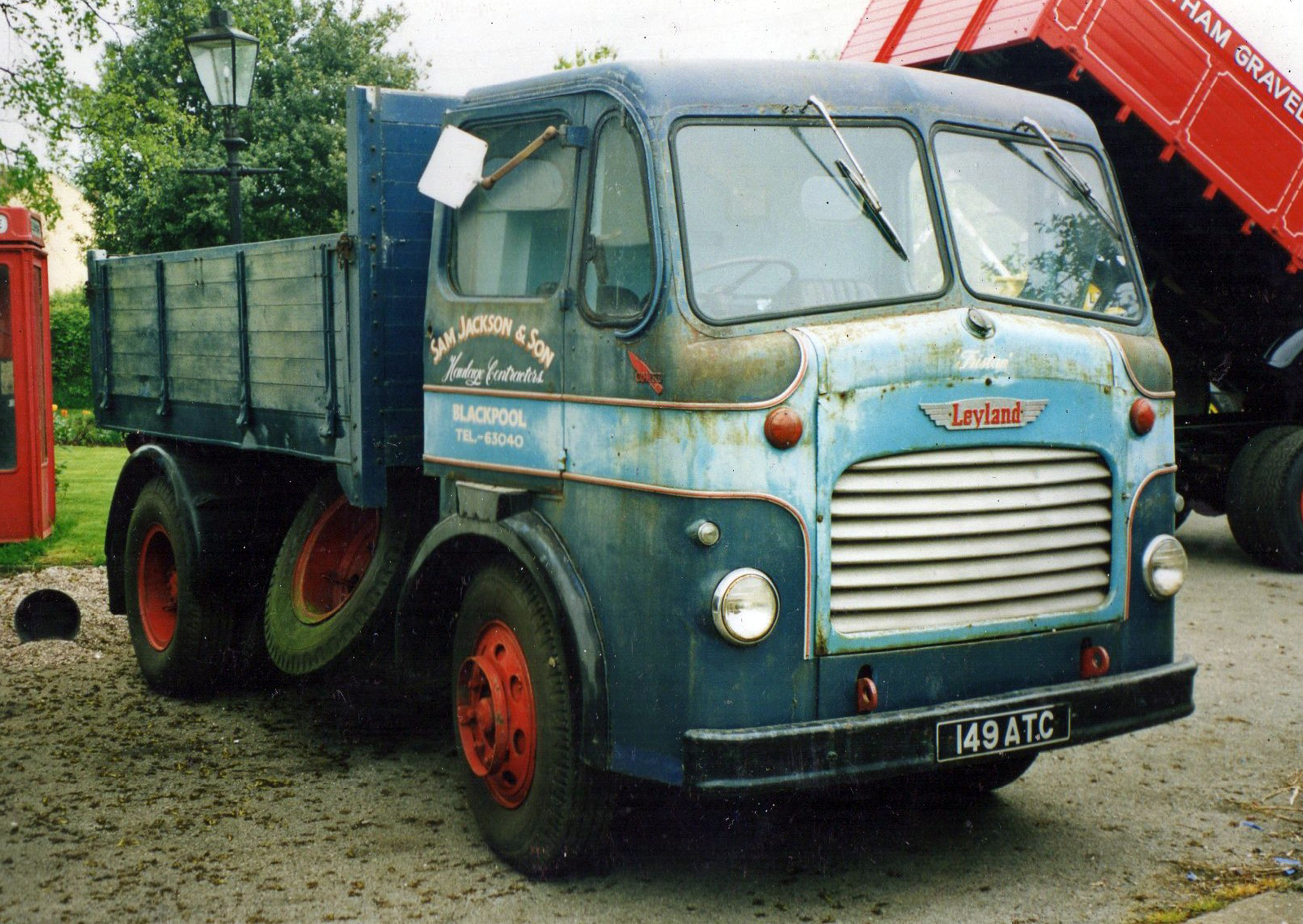
1956 Leyland Comet 100

In 1952 a cab over version of the Comet became available. This was sold next to the bonneted model until 1955/56, depending on the market. Power from the Leyland O.350 engine in the bonneted version went from 90 to 100 hp (67 to 75 kW) in 1955. This model continued in production until 1958, although Australian models continued to use this cab into the early 1960s. This model also entered production in India after having received government approval in 1951. Ashok Motors, Ashok Leyland after 1954, manufactured it locally. The original front clip design remained in use into the early 1970s. Ashok Leyland proceeded to develop a simplified local cab design and continued to build the Comet into the 1990s.

== Third generation ==
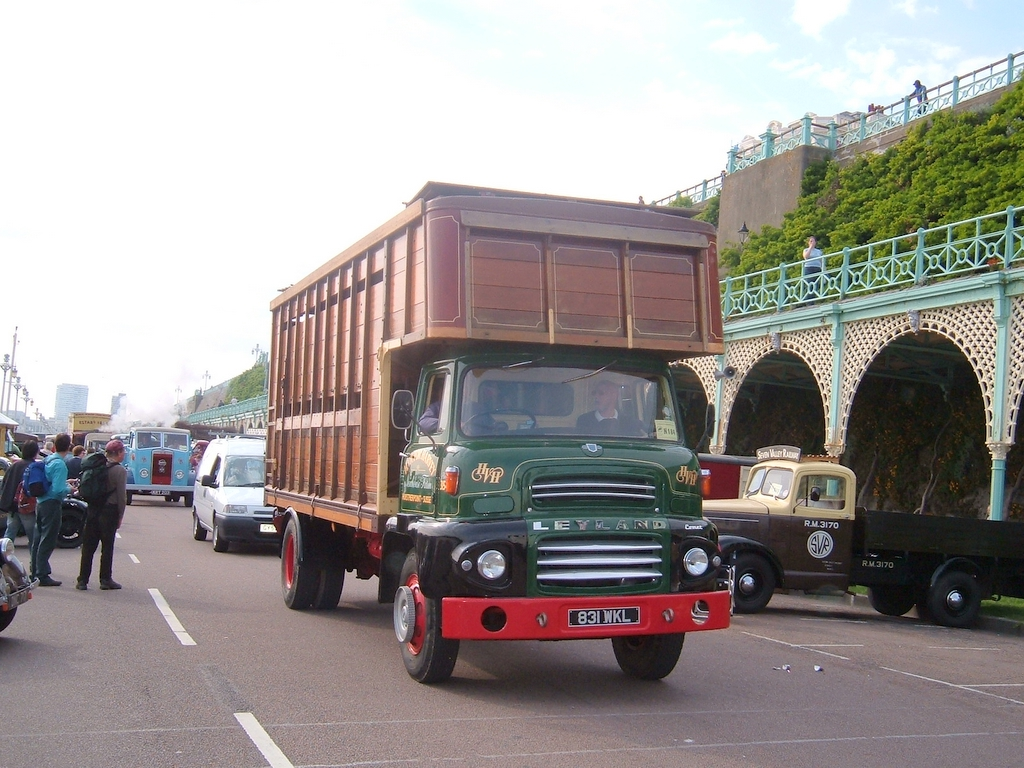
1963 Leyland Comet (LAD)

In 1958, as part of an effectivization program, the Comet received a new cab – called the "Vista Vue" cab, it was developed by Albion for a variety of their models. Dodge UK also used it for their 300 model, consequently this cabin shape is often referred to as the "LAD" design. There was also a heavier duty "Super Comet" model introduced, which eventually largely supplanted the "regular" Comet. Also in 1958 the 375 engine, based on the preceding design and rated at 110 hp, became available in the "Vista Vue" cab. Following this, a redesigned engine with cross-flow cylinder head was released. Initially it was a 370 (6.1 litre) at 110 hp, followed by a 400 (6.6 litre) option at 125 hp.

== Fourth generation ==
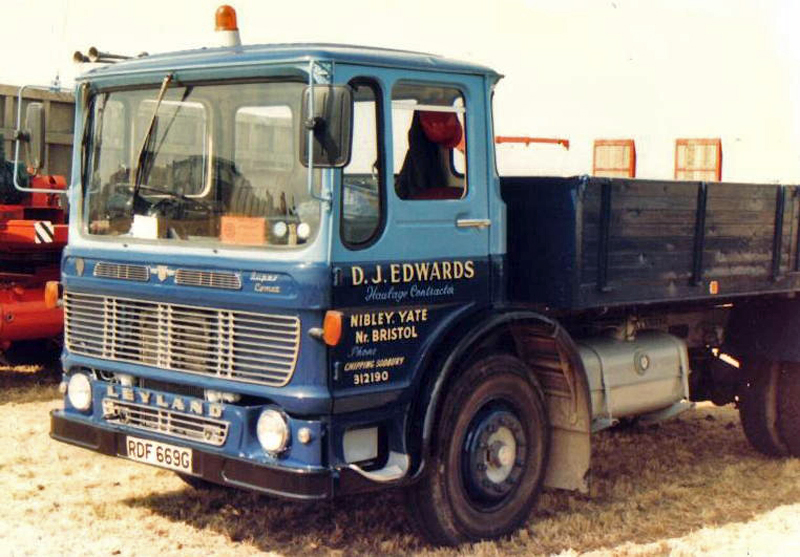
1969 Leyland Super Comet (Ergomatic)

Introduced in 1964, the fourth generation Comet used the Ergomatic cab, as also used by a number of other Leyland models and other British truck manufacturers in Leyland Motor Corporation, the Ergomatic was built by GKN-Sankey while the LAD was the work of Motor Panels.

== Fifth generation ==
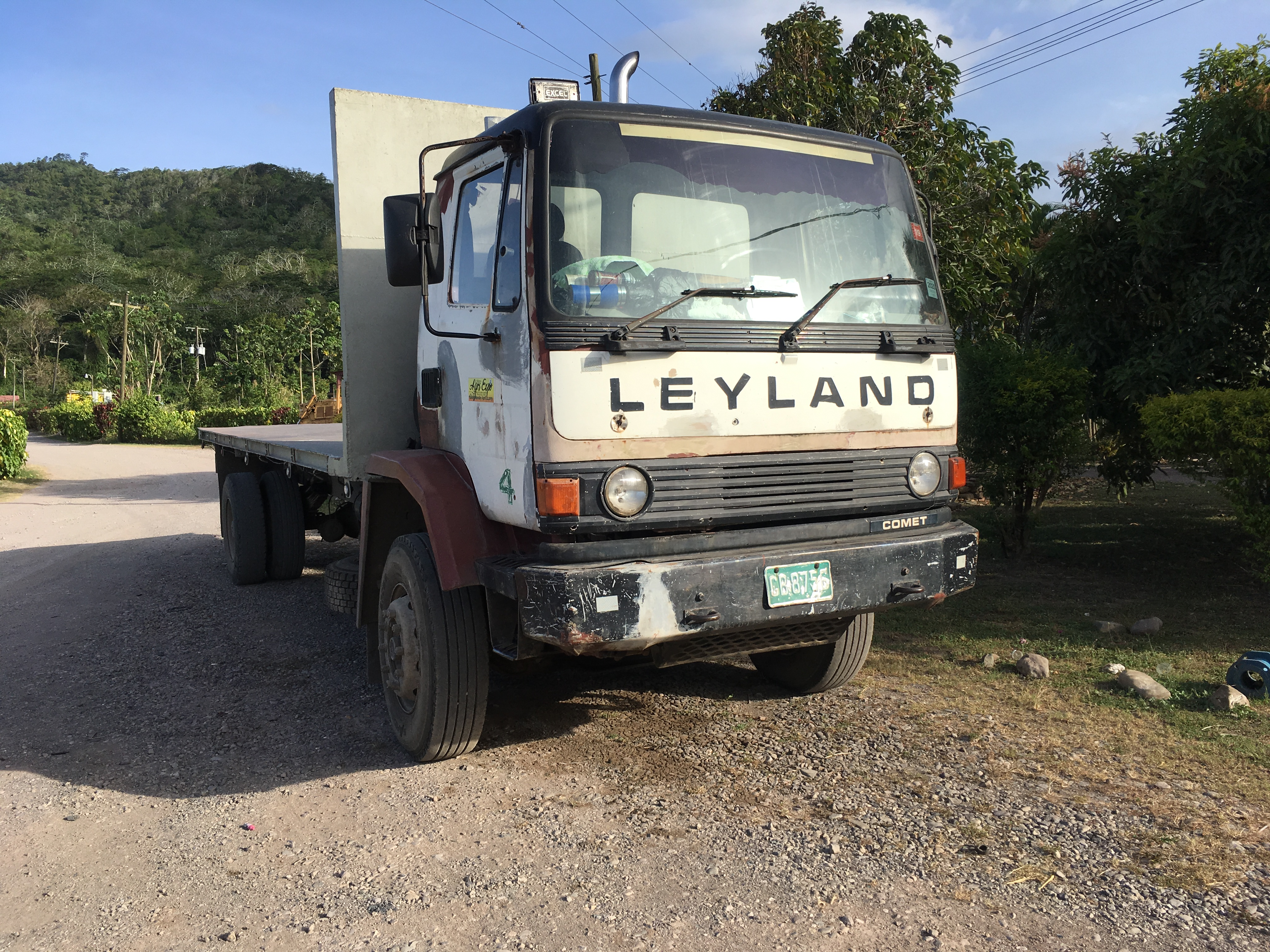
Leyland Comet in Jamaica

After a decade and a half in retirement, the "Comet" label was reintroduced in 1986. As before, the model was intended specifically for export markets, primarily in the developing world, with simplified equipment, fewer gears, and a sturdy construction. The design was an all-metal version of the C44 Roadrunner, again simplified in order to make local assembly easier. It consisted of six major pressings, and was configured to allow for hand welding on a simple jig. The chassis had straight rails. The six-wheeled version was called the "Super Comet".

The Comet was part of a new rationalised range, replacing the Terrier, Boxer, Reiver, Landmaster, and Clydesdale models, although there was some resistance to retiring those classic model names in markets where they had a good reputation. Leyland's previous "export specials", the Landmaster and the larger Landtrain, had been of a bonneted design, but Leyland determined that the bonneted design was becoming less favoured across developing markets.

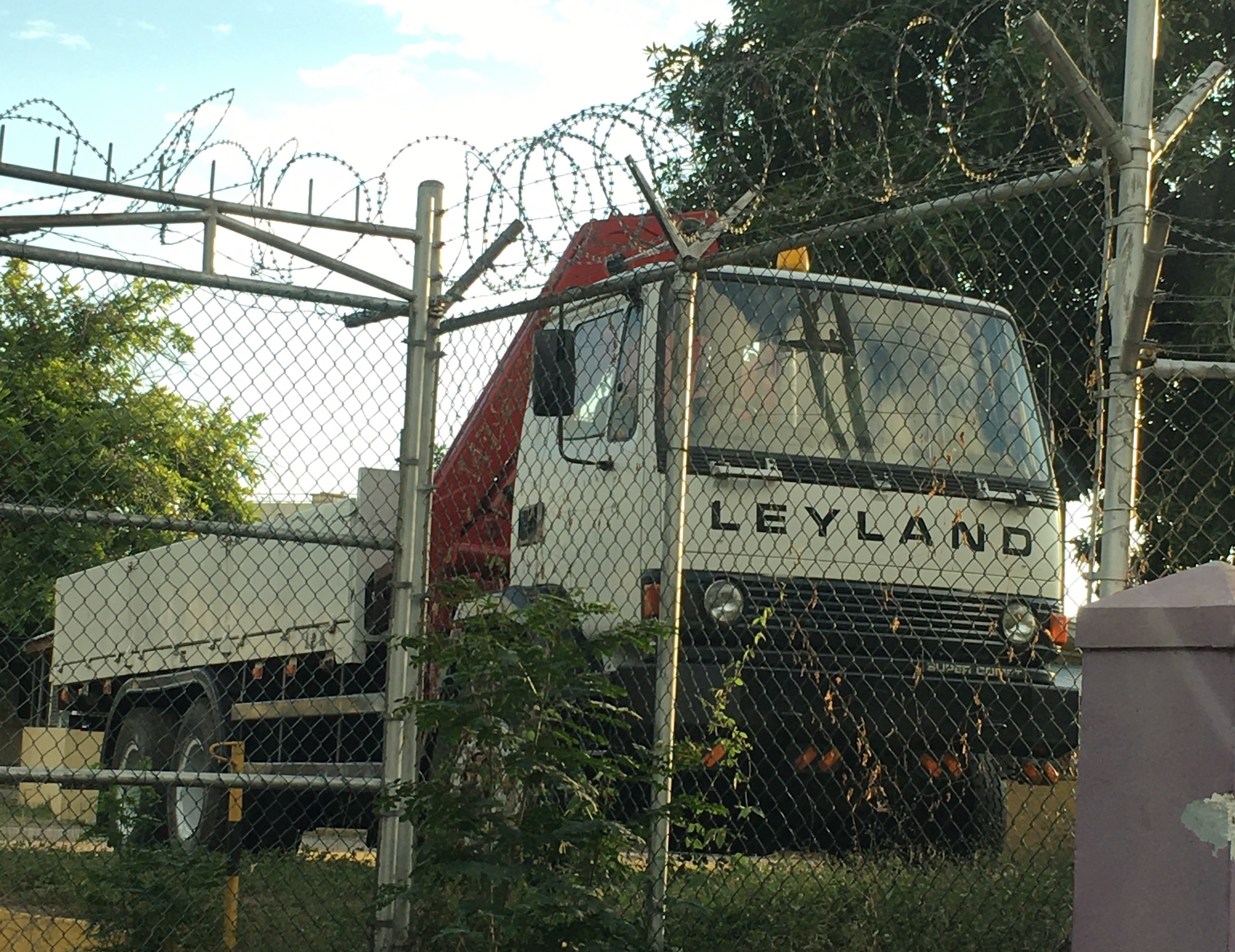
Fifth Generation Super-Comet in Jamaica

Models ranging from 9 to 13 long tons (9,100 to 13,200 kg) received the 115 hp (86 kW) 6-98 NV engine. The 14-long-ton (14,200 kg) truck had the 140 hp (100 kW) Leyland 402, while the heavier 16-long-ton (16,300 kg) model and the Super Comets had the 160 hp (120 kW) Leyland 411. With only five speeds, the top speed of a 1986 12-tonne Comet was a mere 54 mph (87 km/h), but that was more than sufficient for conditions in the target markets, such as Anglophone countries in Sub-Saharan Africa and some Middle Eastern countries. The Caribbean, Central America, Taiwan, the Philippines, Malaysia, Thailand, Singapore and Oceania also received some Comets.
