= Yin Suat Chuan =

Chinese physician

- Born: 1876; Xiamen, China
- Died: April 2, 1958 (aged 81–82); Singapore
- Other names: Physician
- Children: 6, including Leslie Charteris and Roy Henry Bowyer-Yin

Yin Suat Chuan (Chinese: 殷雪村; 1876 - 2 April 1958) was a physician, the first president of the Straits Chinese Football Association, a member of the Municipal Commission of Singapore and a prominent figure of the anti-opium movement in Singapore.

== Early life and education ==
Yin was born in Xiamen, China in 1876. He attended the Anglo-Chinese College in Fuzhou.

== Career ==
Yin came to Singapore in 1898 and became an interpreter in the police courts. He was acquainted with Lim Loh, who helped him travel to the United States in 1899 to study medicine at the University of Michigan, and later the University of Toronto. He went to study at the University College London in 1903 and obtained his degree the following year.

After working in several hospitals in London, Yin returned to Singapore and joined Lim Boon Keng in private practice. Together, they established the Anti-Opium Society in 1906. Yin also established a refuge centre for opium addicts. He was also a member of the Municipal Commission of Singapore and advocated for supplying ignorant coolies in the dispensaries on Victoria Street and Wayang Street with quinine as an experiment. He unsuccessfully campaigned for the names of streets to also be painted in Chinese.

Yin was the first president of the Straits Chinese Football Association, and was a co-founder of the Eastern United Assurance Corporation, the Overseas Assurance Corporation, Oversea-Chinese Bank Ltd. and the Singapore Chinese Chamber of Commerce. In 1925, he was made a Justice of the Peace.

== Personal life and death ==
Yin was married and had six sons, including author Leslie Charteris and clergyman Roy Henry Bowyer-Yin.

Yin died after a long illness on 2 April 1958.
