= Hell Drivers =

1957 British film by Cy Endfield

- Directed by: Cy Endfield
- Written by: Cy Endfield; John Kruse
- Produced by: Benjamin Fisz; Earl St. John
- Starring: Stanley Baker; Sean Connery; Herbert Lom; Peggy Cummins; Jill Ireland; Patrick McGoohan
- Cinematography: Geoffrey Unsworth
- Edited by: John D. Guthridge
- Music by: Hubert Clifford
- Production companies: Aqua Film Productions; Rank Organisation Film Productions
- Distributed by: Rank Organisation
- Release dates: 23 July 1957 (London); 26 July 1957 (United Kingdom); 14 June 1958 (Altoona)
- Running time: 108 minutes
- Country: United Kingdom
- Language: English

Hell Drivers is a 1957 British film noir crime drama film directed by Cy Endfield and starring Stanley Baker, Herbert Lom, Peggy Cummins and Patrick McGoohan. It was written by Endfield and John Kruse, and produced by the Rank Organisation and Aqua Film Productions. A recently released convict takes a driver's job at a haulage company and encounters violence and corruption.

== Plot ==
Saying that he has returned from time abroad, Tom Yately seeks work as a truck driver with Hawletts, a haulage company. Mr. Cartley, the depot manager, informs Tom that his drivers convey their ten-ton loads of gravel fast over bad roads. They are expected to deliver a minimum of twelve loads a day; if a driver falls behind, he is fired. Each run is 20 mi (32 km) round-trip; the top driver makes eighteen runs a day. Tom goes on a trial run with the depot mechanic, in truck 13. He avoids colliding with two other Hawletts trucks speeding the other way.

Cartley hires Tom, who is assigned truck 13. Tom meets the other drivers, including Irishman Red, the foreman and head driver. Lodging at the same house as other drivers, Tom is befriended by Italian driver Gino, who is in love with Lucy, Cartley's secretary. Red offers a £250 gold cigarette case to anyone who can make more runs than him in a day, and Tom is determined to try; however, he soon learns that Red has kept his place at the top by taking a dangerous shortcut that no other driver is willing to risk.

One evening, the drivers go to a dance at a hall and start a fight. When the police are called, Tom flees the scene. Red calls him a coward and, from then on, the other drivers (except Gino) turn on Tom, bullying him incessantly, impeding his runs, and calling him "yellow belly". Despite this, Tom does not retaliate.

Tom visits his brother Jimmy and mother in their tobacconist's shop. His mother refuses to accept money from Tom, blaming him for Jimmy's life-changing leg injury that requires him to use crutches.

When the drivers collect their pay packets, Tom realises he has been underpaid. Gleeful, Red informs Tom his wages were docked to replace equipment damaged as a result of the drivers' bullying. A fistfight ensues, in which Tom beats Red. Gino offers to switch truck numbers with Tom the next day, so that the others can unwittingly harass Gino and therefore help Tom win the cigarette case.

That night, Lucy breaks up with Gino. Expressing her feelings for Tom while he performs a vehicle check, Tom confesses that he had not actually been abroad but was instead serving a year-long prison sentence. Lucy drops off Tom at the drivers' digs, both unaware that Gino has seen them from a window.

The next day, Tom purchases a one-way train ticket to London. Lucy rushes into the waiting room and reveals that Gino has been injured in a crash. Distraught, they rush to the hospital. While they wait outside Gino's room, Lucy says that Cartley and Red have been scamming money by hiring five fewer drivers than the company pays for and pocketing the difference. A doctor later reveals that Gino is dying. Gino switched the truck numbers as arranged, and tells Tom "I threw them off like we planned, for you to win. Crazy. You don't even come." Tom asks if it was Red who caused his crash, but Gino dies without answering.

Tom returns to the depot and confronts Cartley. He says that Gino died and that the scam had been the reason. Cartley offers him a share of the stolen money and Red's place in truck 1. Tom reluctantly takes truck 1 to pick up a load. When Red turns up, he forces Cartley to join him in what they think is truck 3 and sets out to silence Tom. Red guesses that Tom will take the shortcut, and they lie in wait there. When Tom appears with his truck full of ballast, Red starts sideswiping him, forcing him off the road and onto the edge of a quarry, where the truck dangles, with Tom knocked unconscious. But the brakes on Red's truck, which Red realises is Tom's truck 13, fail; he and Cartley drive off the edge and die. Tom wakes up and escapes before his own truck tumbles into the quarry. Lucy, who followed them in a jeep, runs to him.

== Cast ==
- Stanley Baker as Tom Yately, driver, truck 13
- Herbert Lom as Gino Rossi, driver, truck 3
- Peggy Cummins as Lucy
- Patrick McGoohan as G. "Red" Redman, driver, truck 1
- William Hartnell as Cartley, the depot manager
- Wilfrid Lawson as Ed, Hawlett's mechanic
- Sid James as Dusty, driver, truck 22
- Jill Ireland as Jill, 'Pull Inn' waitress
- Alfie Bass as Tinker, driver, truck 11
- Gordon Jackson as Scottie, driver, truck 7
- David McCallum as Jimmy Yately, Tom's brother
- Sean Connery as Johnny Kates, driver, truck 19
- Wensley Pithey as Pop, driver, truck 4
- George Murcell as Tub, driver, truck 2
- Marjorie Rhodes as Ma West, landlady
- Vera Day as blonde at dance
- Beatrice Varley as Mrs. Yately, Tom's mother
- Robin Bailey as Hawlett's assistant manager
- John Miller
- Jerry Stovin as Chick Keithley
- John Horsley as doctor attending Gino
- Marianne Stone as nurse attending Gino
- Ronald Clarke as Barber Joe, driver, truck 6
- Charles Lamb as cafe owner (uncredited)
- Hal Osmond as station ticket clerk (uncredited)
- Ben Williams as Harry, Hawlett's gateman (uncredited)
- Ian Wilson as Gibson, Hawlett's paymaster (uncredited)

== Actors ==
Hell Drivers is an early film for several actors who later developed high-profile careers, with breakthrough roles as 1960s spies. It provided early appearances for Jill Ireland and David McCallum (The Man from U.N.C.L.E.), who met and married during the film's production. It featured Danger Man and The Prisoner actor Patrick McGoohan, and was the third film role for Sean Connery. William Hartnell was the first actor to play the role of the Doctor in the BBC's Doctor Who; Gordon Jackson appeared as George Cowley in The Professionals and the butler Hudson in ITV's Upstairs, Downstairs. Sid James was a regular supporting actor in British films at the time and appeared in most of the Carry On series. Herbert Lom starred in the ABC Weekend TV series The Human Jungle before playing the hapless Commissioner Dreyfus in The Pink Panther film franchise. Cy Endfield directed Stanley Baker in Zulu. Others including Robin Bailey, Charles Lamb, John Horsley and Wensley Pithey featured regularly in British films and television thereafter. Long-established actor Wilfrid Lawson also made an appearance. In 1966, he co-starred with Patrick McGoohan in the final black-and-white episode of Danger Man, "Not So Jolly Roger".

== Production ==
Filming started 31 December 1956.

The character of Yately comes from Blaenllechau in the Rhondda, near actor Stanley Baker's birthplace of Ferndale.

Footage of a Hawlett's lorry going over the edge of a quarry was reused in "The Heiress" episode of the Rank Organisation television series Interpol Calling.

The vehicles used in the film were the Dodge 100 "Kew" parrot-nosed truck, with tipper body. They were lent for filming by W W Drinkwater of Willesden, north London.

The fleet of Dodge ‘parrot-nose’ or ‘Kew’ 100s, were built in Kew on the outskirts of London between 1949 and 1957.

Filmink said "Rank’s films under St John were famously timid in their story angles, especially compared to rivals such as Woodfall, Bryanston, Hammer and Romulus" but argued "the odd gutsy movie did sneak through", giving Hell Drivers as an example.

== Promotional film ==
Aqua/Rank produced a 14-minute promotional film Look in on Hell Drivers, directed by Bill Morton and introduced by Michael Ingrams, with professional lorry drivers vouching for the film's authenticity, clips from the film and interviews with Cy Endfield, co-writer John Kruse, Alfie Bass and Stanley Baker.

== Reception ==
=== Box office ===
In September 1957 Kinematograph Weekly reported the film "ended comfortably on the right side. The masses thoroughly enjoyed its beefy fare." However the movie did not make the Kinematograph Weekly list of most popular films of 1957. The movie did turn Baker into a local film star.

=== Critical reception ===
The Monthly Film Bulletin wrote: "This extraordinary film may interest future historians for its description of road haulage and masculine social behaviour in the mid-twentieth century; perhaps fortunately, however, it is so unconvincing in every respect that even the most gullible could not accept it as a representative picture of either. There are some good individual acting performances, but the film, though produced with efficiency and assurance, is disagreeable and occasionally vicious."

Variety said: "Hell Drivers is a slab of unabashed melodrama. [...] Endfield’s direction is straightforward and conventional, but some of the speed sequences provide some tingling thrills. Acting is adequate, but uninspired. Baker gives a forceful performance of restrained strength and Herbert Lom has some neat moments as his Italian buddy. Patrick McGoohan gives an exaggerated study as the villain."

Time Out wrote: "Energetic and violent trucking thriller marked by the raw, angry edge of the best of blacklist victim Endfield's Hollywood work, and by his appreciation [...] of the markedly out-of-the-mainstream talent of Stanley Baker."

Filmink called it "terrific". Leslie Halliwell opined: "Absurd, violent, hilarious and constantly surprising melodrama with the silliest of premises backed by a good cast and well-handled thrill sequences".

In British Sound Films David Quinlan wrote that the film was "rough, tough stuff; basically unconvincing perhaps, but still a good thriller".

Reviewing for Empire, Kim Newman said "Hell Drivers is a rare British crime film with the blazing excitement and working-class grit of the best American hardboiled thrillers. [...] Lom overdoes it somewhat as the sentimental Italian obviously doomed to become a plot sacrifice, but the rest of the hairy-knuckled blokes are spot on."

In The New York Times Dave Kehr said the film "achieves an intensity of action and an existential resonance comparable to The Wages of Fear."

== Home media ==
In 2007 Network Distributing released the film on DVD in an anamorphically enhanced ratio of 1.77:1. A little of the original 1.96:1 VistaVision (wide-frame) image is cropped at the sides, just noticeable in a few shots. The DVD featured commentary by sound assistant Harry Fairbairn and journalist Andrew Robertson, and extras including Look in on Hell Drivers. The DVD also contains the 1974 television film Who Killed Lamb?, which is another film that starred Stanley Baker. On 20 March 2017, Network issued a Blu-ray with the film restored by the BFI, and the same extras as the DVD.

== See also ==
The film's theme of the desperate, lorry driving man can be compared to that of The Long Haul (1957).
