= Dodge 100 "Kew" =

Range of trucks

The Dodge 100 "Kew" was a range of trucks made from 1949 until 1957 by the American Dodge company at their British factory in Kew, London. The trucks were often nicknamed the "parrot nose" due to their distinctive shaped bonnets and grilles. Most of the trucks were powered by either Perkins diesel or Chrysler petrol engines. The cab body was built by Briggs Motor Bodies and was shared with the Ford Thames ET6 and Leyland Comet. They were featured in the 1957 film Hell Drivers.

In India, the same model was manufactured by Premier Automobiles Limited and production continued until the 1980s. Many were still in operation as of 2016 in some regions. Since the early 1970s it has been known as Premier Roadmaster for diesel versions and Pioneer for petrol versions, otherwise simply known as Fargo.

== Gallery ==
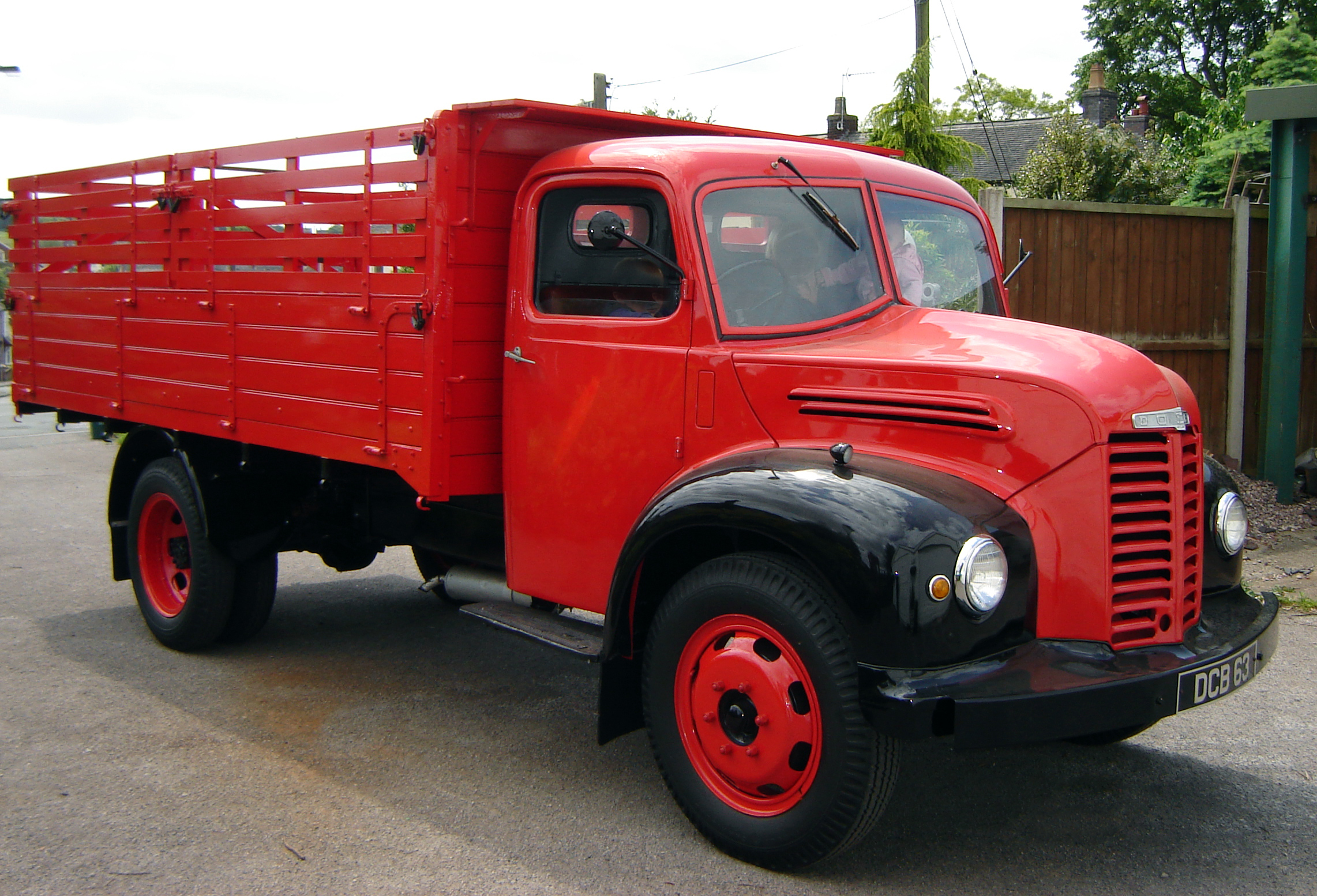
Dodge Kew "Parrot Nose"

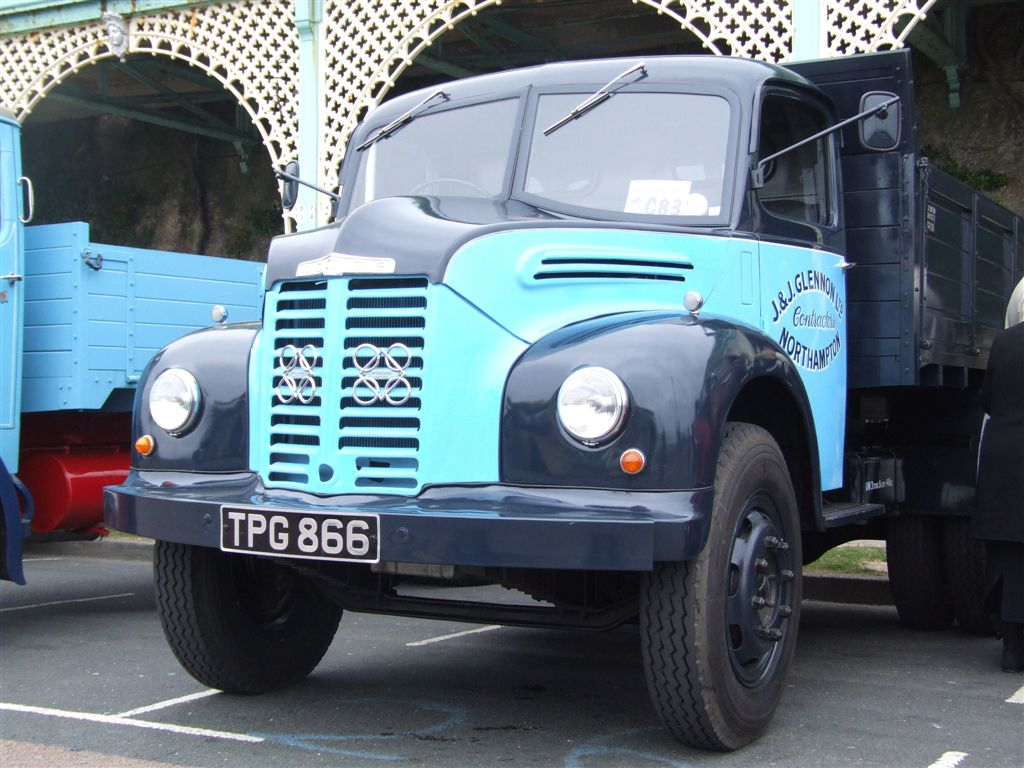
Dodge Kew "Parrot Nose" tipper truck

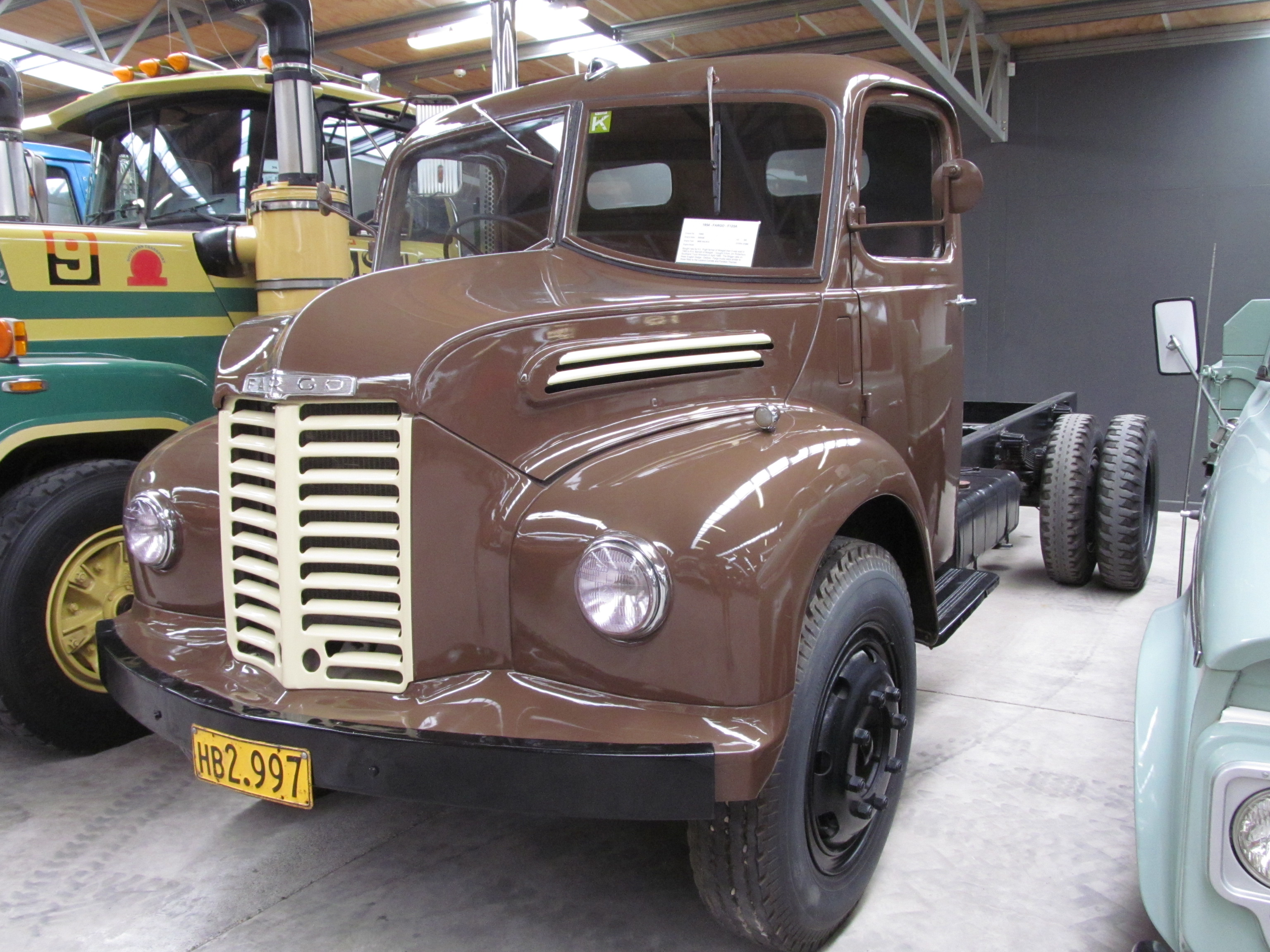
1954 Fargo in New Zealand
