= Vendetta for the Saint =

1964 novel by Harry Harrison

- 1964 American hardback
- Author: Harry Harrison (based upon characters created by Leslie Charteris)
- Language: English
- Series: The Saint
- Genre: Mystery
- Publisher: The Crime Club
- Publication date: 1964
- Publication place: United Kingdom
- Media type: Print (Hardback & Paperback)
- Preceded by: The Saint in the Sun
- Followed by: The Saint on TV

Vendetta for the Saint is a 1964 mystery novel featuring the character of Simon Templar, alias "The Saint". Vendetta for the Saint was the first full-length Saint novel published since The Saint Sees It Through, 18 years earlier. A television adaptation of the novel was released as a theatrical film, also entitled Vendetta for the Saint, in 1969.

== Development ==
Vendetta was the first Saint volume published after Leslie Charteris, who created the character in 1928, stopped writing the adventures himself. Charteris was credited as the author and remained as editor, approving stories and revising material when needed, but the novels were largely written by other authors. These books were mostly based on the TV series comic strip; the next wholly original Saint literary stories were not published until the novella collection Catch the Saint more than a decade later.

Vendetta was written by Harry Harrison, a noted science fiction author who also wrote the syndicated Saint comic strip from 1955 to 1960. In an interview, Harrison claimed that Charteris contributed in a very minor way. The reference work The Saint: A Complete History by Burl Barer, however, indicates that Charteris was heavily involved in editing the book.

== Plot summary ==
On holiday in Naples, Simon Templar witnesses an argument in a restaurant; an English tourist greets an Italian businessman as an old friend, but the Italian claims never to have met him. When the businessman's bodyguard attacks the Englishman, Templar intervenes and the Italians leave. Templar learns that the Englishman, Euston, is adamant that the Italian businessman was his old friend Dino Cartelli.

Next morning, Templar sees an obituary for Euston in the local newspaper, stating the man had an unfortunate accident. Suspicious, the Saint starts an investigation. He discovers that Dino Cartelli was a faithful bank employee, murdered by bank robbers years ago. His face and hands were mutilated beyond recognition. He also learns that the businessman is Alessandro Destamio.

The next day, a limousine arrives at the hotel, and Templar is invited for a meeting with Mr. Destamio. He is flown to Destamio's private island, where Destamio introduces himself as a businessman with many enemies, who takes his privacy very seriously.

Back in Naples, Templar is attacked by street robbers. The police arrive and take them to the police station for questioning, where the police accuse him of attacking the robber. However, a senior officer, Inspector Ponti, arrives, dismisses the charges against him. The Saint understands it is a veiled invitation, and waits for Ponti at the restaurant. Ponti explains that the Saint is up against the Mafia. They will try to hunt him down and the police cannot be trusted. Ponti will be his only ally.

Templar then visits Destamio's family, including Gina. Later that night, he visits the mausoleum of the Destamio family, but before he can investigate the grave inscriptions, he is clubbed unconscious.

Captured in a castle, at the mercy of the Mafia, Templar is brought to the head of the Mafia, who is seriously ill. It appears Destamio aims to be his successor, but he has to defeat other candidates who wonder why Destamio has brought the Saint to their headquarters. It appears that Destamio claims to be from a worthy family, which the Saint might dispute.

Returned to his cell, Templar unties his ropes and escaped the dungeon. Pursued by gangsters, he descends from the castle hill and starts running through the Italian countryside. During the chase, he has brief encounters with locals who help him, but their fear of the Mafia is all-apparent. A local barber manages to conceal him and tells him to leave as soon as possible. Bus passengers on the Palermo bus stay clear of him, realising he is on the Mafia's hit list.

The Saint manages to reach Palermo and contacts Ponti. Then the tables can be turned. Ponti has mobilised a secret military strike force, ready for battle, and very grateful to learn from Templar the location of the Mafia headquarters.

The Saint joins the attack on the castle. Although the castle is surrounded, the Mafia succeeds in ramming through the perimeter in a car. The army commander, Templar and Ponti start the pursuit. When they cross through Palermo, they discover they have chased the car too long, and the head men must have escaped. Whilst driving back, the Saint leaves the car and sends Ponti to call reinforcements.

The Saint enters the house where the Mafia top men have gathered. He confronts them, but before he can thoroughly question Destamio, he is again surprised by the wife of one of the mafiosi. After that, the army troops arrive, and although several top men are arrested, Destamio escapes.

The Saint knows that he can only go to one other place and sets off for the Destamio mansion. There, he finally confronts Destamio. Confronted by Templar, he admits that his real name is Dino Cartelli. He offers the Saint a bribe in return for his freedom, who then hands Cartelli to the arriving police.

== In other media ==
=== Television ===
Vendetta for the Saint was adapted as a two-part episode of The Saint, and was broadcast during the programme's final season on January 5 and 12, 1969. Roger Moore played Simon Templar. After the series ended, the two episodes were edited together as a movie that was distributed theatrically in Europe and was also released to TV and, much later, home video.

The TV series adapted a number of Charteris' original Saint stories and novels during its run; Vendetta for the Saint was the last of these adaptations to be broadcast, and the only one not based upon a solo Charteris work. It is also one of only four full-length novels to be adapted for the series.

Location shooting took place in Malta, for the producers were afraid of shooting a movie with a Mafia theme on location in Naples or Sicily.
