= Norman Worker =

British comic book writer

Norman Worker (1927 – 5 February 2005) was a British comic book writer, best known for his work on comic books featuring Lee Falk's The Phantom.

Norman was born in Kent, England, in 1927. When he was 17 years old, he fought in World War II in India. After that, he worked in his father's furniture factory until it went bankrupt in the 1950s.

It was his cousin, Modesty Blaise-creator Peter O'Donnell, who suggested that Norman could become a comic book writer. This led to Norman writing stories featuring The Saint and Buffalo Bill for Semic, a Swedish comic book company.

It was on Semic that Norman started writing stories with The Phantom. At first, he used the pen-name "J. Bull", but he quickly started to sign the stories with his real name.

Norman was arguably the most popular writer of the Scandinavian Phantom production; who ended up writing 127 stories before he retired in 2004. Norman is credited for being responsible for providing backstories to many of the previous Phantoms of other centuries, which was a result of his love for history.
