= John Kruse =

English film and TV screenwriter, director and novelist (1921–2004)

- Born: 1921; England, United Kingdom
- Died: 2004 (aged 82–83); Almuñécar, Spain
- Occupations: Novelist, screenwriter, film director
- Writing career
- Genres: Mystery fiction, screenwriting

John Kruse (1921–2004) was an English film and television screenwriter, director and novelist. He is mostly remembered for his work on ITC classic TV series The Saint, as well as several films of the franchise, and as the author of the best-selling novel Red Omega.

== Life ==
John Kruse was born in England and educated at Harrow. His father, Jack Frederick Conrad Kruse, was a captain in the Royal Navy and close associate of tycoon Lord Rothermere, founder of the Daily Mail. A wealthy couple, Kruse's parents lived between London and the French Riviera, but the 1929 crash greatly damaged their fortune. During World War II, John served as a liaison officer in India, the Middle East and Italy. After the war, he returned to England to find his home bombed, his parents dead, and no family business. At the age of twenty-six, he began a new career from scratch.

He joined Pinewood Film Studios as a clapper boy and, during the next seven years, progressed to become cameraman, at the same time working nights to perfect his writing. His short stories began to appear in magazines in Britain and the United States in the early fifties; some of these stories were later developed into screenplays. Hell Drivers (1957) was his first credited film, based on his own short story and co-scripted with director Cy Endfield. By 1954 Kruse had switched to full-time scriptwriting, working in over a dozen of films. Starting in the 1960s, he also wrote many hundreds of episodes for British and international TV shows, including The Avengers, Shoestring, Colditz, The Persuaders!, and most famously The Saint, starring Roger Moore.

In 1981, Kruse abandoned screenwriting and moved to Almuñécar, in Granada, Spain, where he began a new career as a novelist. He published three novels. The first one, Red Omega (1981), became a best-seller—a Cold War spy thriller involving a CIA plot to murder Stalin using a rogue agent from Extremadura who survived the gulags. It was later followed by a sequel, Long Live the Dead, and Hour of the Lily, an epic story of love and war in Russian-occupied Afghanistan.

After these three novels, Kruse took up painting. He died in Almuñécar in 2004.

== Work ==
=== Television credits ===
- ITV Television Playhouse
- Lilli Palmer Theatre
- Assignment Foreign Legion
- Armchair Theatre
- William Tell
- Knight Errand Limited
- Interpol Calling
- Adventures in Paradise
- The Avengers
- Top Secret
- Zero One
- The Human Jungle
- No Hiding Place
- Undermind
- The Third Man
- The Man in Room 17
- The Saint
- Strange Report
- Colditz
- The Persuaders!
- The Protectors
- The Zoo Gang
- Return of the Saint
- Shoestring
- The Professionals

=== Film credits ===
- Hell Drivers (1957)
- Sea Fury (1958)
- October Moth (also director; 1960)
- Echo of Barbara (1961)
- The Fiction Makers (1968)
- Crossplot (1969)
- Vendetta for the Saint (1970)
- Assault (1971)
- Revenge (1971)
- Mission: Monte Carlo (1974)
- The Saint and the Brave Goose (1979)

=== Novels ===
- Red Omega (1981)
- Long Live the Dead
- Hour of the Lily (1984)
