= Leslie Charteris =

British-Chinese author

- Born: Leslie Charles Bowyer-Yin; 12 May 1907; British Singapore
- Died: 15 April 1993 (aged 85); Windsor, Berkshire, England
- Occupations: Thriller writer, screenwriter
- Spouse: Audrey Long (m. 1952–1993)
- Writing career
- Period: 20th century
- Genre: Thriller
- Website: www.lesliecharteris.com

Leslie Charteris (/ˈtʃɑːrtərɪs/; born Leslie Charles Bowyer-Yin; 12 May 1907 – 15 April 1993), was a British-Chinese author of adventure fiction, as well as a screenwriter. He was best known for his many books chronicling the adventures of his hero Simon Templar, alias "The Saint".

== Early life ==
Charteris was born Leslie Charles Bowyer-Yin, in Singapore. His mother, Lydia Florence Bowyer, was English. His father, Dr S. C. Yin (Yin Suat Chuan, 1877–1958), was a Chinese physician who claimed to be able to trace his lineage back to the emperors of the Shang dynasty. He is the elder brother of the Anglican clergyman Roy Henry Bowyer-Yin.

Leslie became interested in writing at an early age. At one point, he created his own magazine with articles, short stories, poems, editorials, serials, and even a comic strip. He attended Saint Andrew's School, Singapore, and after moving to England, Rossall School in Fleetwood, Lancashire. His formal education continued at King's College, Cambridge, where he read law. However, he dropped out in his first year to focus on developing his burgeoning literary career.

In 1926, Leslie legally changed his surname to "Charteris". In the BBC Radio 4 documentary Leslie Charteris – A Saintly Centennial, his daughter stated that he had selected the name from a telephone directory. This information is contradicted by other sources, however. William Ruehlmann (author of Saint with a Gun: The Unlawful American Private Eye, in an introduction to the 1988 edition of The Saint in New York, "He acquired..., in 1928, the legal name of Charteris, after the roguish Col. Francis, gambler, duellist and founder of the Hellfire Club" – however this confuses the rake Col. Francis Charteris with Francis Dashwood, 11th Baron le Despencer, also a rake and founder of the Hellfire Club.

== Career ==
Charteris wrote his first book during his first year at King's College, Cambridge. Once it was accepted, he left the university and embarked on a new career, motivated by a desire to be unconventional and to become financially well off by doing what he liked to do. He continued to write British thriller stories while working at various jobs, from shipping out on a freighter to working as a barman in a country inn. He prospected for gold, dived for pearls, worked in a tin mine and on a rubber plantation, toured Britain with a carnival, and drove a bus.

=== Origin of Simon Templar ===
Charteris's third novel, Meet the Tiger (1928), introduced his most famous creation, Simon Templar. However, in his 1980 introduction to a reprint by Charter Books, Charteris indicated he was dissatisfied with the work, suggesting its only value was as the start of the long-running Saint series. Occasionally, he chose to ignore the existence of Meet the Tiger altogether and claimed that the Saint series actually began with the second volume, Enter the Saint (1930); an example of this can be found in the introduction Charteris wrote to an early 1960s edition of Enter the Saint published by Fiction Publishing Company (an imprint of Doubleday).

Charteris wrote a few other books, including a novelization of his screenplay for the Deanna Durbin mystery-comedy Lady on a Train, and the English translation of Juan Belmonte: Killer of Bulls by Manuel Chaves Nogales. However, his lifework – at least in the literary world – consisted primarily of Simon Templar Saint adventures, which were presented in novel, novella, and short-story formats over the next 35 years. From 1963 onward, other authors ghost-wrote the stories, while Charteris acted as an editor, approving stories and making revisions when needed.

=== Move to the United States ===
Charteris relocated to the United States in 1932, where he continued to publish short stories and also became a writer for Paramount Pictures, working on the George Raft film Midnight Club. Charteris also wrote scripts for Alex Raymond's newspaper comic Secret Agent X-9 in 1935 to 1936. One story was drawn by Raymond, and the other two by Raymond's successor Charles Flanders.

However, Charteris was excluded from permanent residency in the United States because of the Chinese Exclusion Act, a law which prohibited immigration for persons of "50% or greater" Oriental blood. As a result, Charteris was continually forced to renew his six-month temporary visitor's visa. Eventually, an act of Congress granted both Charteris and his daughter the right of permanent residence in the United States, with eligibility for naturalization, which he completed in 1946. After two decades, he permanently resettled in England with his wife.

=== Other activities ===
In 1936, Charteris was a passenger on the maiden voyage of the Hindenburg. In America, The Saint became a radio series starring Vincent Price. In the 1940s, Charteris, besides continuing to write The Saint stories, scripted the Sherlock Holmes radio series featuring Basil Rathbone and Nigel Bruce. In 1941, Charteris appeared in a Life photographic adaptation of a short story of The Saint, with himself playing the Saint.

=== The Saint on film ===
Long-term success eluded Charteris' creation outside the literary arena until RKO produced an eight-film series between 1938 and 1943: The Saint in New York (1938) with Louis Hayward as The Saint, The Saint Strikes Back (1939), The Saint in London (1939, filmed on location), The Saint's Double Trouble (1940), The Saint Takes Over (1940), and The Saint in Palm Springs (1941) all with George Sanders as The Saint. Another Briton, Hugh Sinclair, took over the role in The Saint's Vacation (filmed by RKO's British studio in 1941) and The Saint Meets the Tiger (again produced by RKO in 1941 but shelved until Republic Pictures released it in 1943).

A ninth film, The Saint's Return (known as The Saint's Girl Friday in the US) from 1953, with Louis Hayward returning as The Saint, is sometimes regarded as part of the RKO series. However, it was produced by British Hammer Film Productions, based on an agreement between Hammer Films and Charteris, which gave Charteris a percentage in the film. RKO acted only as the film's US distributor, six months after the UK release.

Both George Sanders and Charteris had complaints about the Saint pictures; Sanders because he disliked playing the same role again and again, and Charteris because of the liberties taken by the screenwriters. RKO dropped the Saint series and replaced it with The Falcon, another debonair amateur sleuth played by Sanders. Charteris saw this as a ploy to deprive him of his royalties and sued RKO. Sanders bailed out of the Falcon series after three films, and was replaced by his brother, Tom Conway.

A film loosely based on the character simply titled The Saint was released in 1997 with Val Kilmer in the title role.

=== The Saint on TV ===
From 1962 to 1969 the British television series The Saint went into production with Roger Moore in the Simon Templar role.

Many episodes of the TV series were based upon Charteris' short stories. Later, as original scripts were commissioned, Charteris permitted some of these scripts to be novelized and published as further adventures of the Saint in printed form (these later books, with titles such as The Saint on TV and The Saint and the Fiction Makers, carried Charteris' name as author, but were in fact written by others). Charteris lived to see a second British TV series, Return of the Saint starring Ian Ogilvy as Simon Templar, enjoy a well-received, if brief, run in the late 1970s (with Charteris himself making a cameo appearance in one episode) and, in the 1980s, a series of TV movies produced by an international co-production and starring Simon Dutton kept interest in The Saint alive. Also, an ill-fated attempt at a 1980s TV series was made in the United States, which resulted in only a pilot episode being produced and broadcast. He also produced the original theme tune for the series, as can be seen in the end credits.

== Later life ==
The adventures of The Saint were chronicled in nearly 100 books (about 50 published in the UK and US, with others published in France). Charteris himself stepped away from writing the books after The Saint in the Sun (1963). The next year, Vendetta for the Saint was published and while it was credited to Charteris, it was actually written by science fiction writer Harry Harrison. Following Vendetta came a number of books adapting televised episodes, credited to Charteris, but written by others, although Charteris did collaborate on several Saint books in the 1970s. Charteris appears to have served in an editorial capacity for these later volumes. He also edited and contributed to The Saint Mystery Magazine, a digest-sized publication. The final book in the Saint series was Salvage for the Saint, published in 1983. Two additional books were published in 1997, a novelization of the film loosely based on the character, and an original novel published by "The Saint Club", a fan club that Charteris himself founded in the 1930s. Both books were written by Burl Barer, who also wrote the definitive history on Charteris and The Saint.

Charteris spent 55 years – 1928 to 1983 – as either writer of or custodian of Simon Templar's literary adventures, one of the longest uninterrupted spans of a single author in the history of mystery fiction, equalling that of Agatha Christie, who wrote her novels and stories featuring detective Hercule Poirot.

A comic book adaptation of The Saint was produced in Sweden from 1969 to 1991 with at least 170 stories produced. As part of the contract, all story ideas had to be approved by Charteris himself before the story was completed. Among the creators of these stories were writers Norman Worker and Donne Avenell; the latter also co-wrote the novels The Saint and the Templar Treasure and the novella collection Count on the Saint, while Worker contributed to the novella collection Catch the Saint.

== Personal life and death ==
Charteris also wrote a column on cuisine for an American magazine, and invented a wordless, pictorial sign language called Paleneo, which he wrote a book about. Charteris was one of the earliest members of Mensa.

Charteris married four times (see the Family section below for details). In 1952, Charteris married Hollywood actress Audrey Long (1922–2014). The couple returned to England in the 1960s, living in Surrey until the death of Charteris. Their address was Corfield, Ridgemead Road, Englefield Green. He died at Princess Margaret's Hospital Windsor, Berkshire, on 15 April 1993, survived by his wife and daughter, Patricia Charteris Higgins. Audrey died at Egham, Surrey in September 2014, aged 92.

== Family ==
He was married four times:

1. (in 1931) to Pauline Schishkin (1911–1975), daughter of a Russian diplomat and mother of Charteris's only child, a daughter, born in 1932
2. (in 1938) to Barbara Meyer (1907–1950), editor at The American Magazine
3. (in 1943) to Elizabeth Bryant Borst (1909–2003), Boston society woman and night club singer
4. (in 1952) to Audrey Long (1922–2014), film actress

Charteris was the brother of Rev Roy Bowyer-Yin.

== Works ==
For a list of all Charteris's works, see List of works by Leslie Charteris; for a breakdown of Simon Templar novels, novellas and short story collections by Charteris, see the list at Simon Templar.

In addition, Charteris authored numerous uncollected short stories and essays.
