= The Saint Strikes Back =

1939 film by John Farrow

- Directed by: John Farrow
- Written by: John Twist
- Based on: She Was a Lady; 1931 novel by Leslie Charteris
- Produced by: Robert Sisk
- Starring: George Sanders; Wendy Barrie; Jonathan Hale
- Cinematography: Frank Redman
- Edited by: Jack Hively
- Music by: Roy Webb
- Distributed by: RKO Radio Pictures
- Release date: March 10, 1939
- Running time: 64 minutes
- Language: English
- Budget: $128,000
- Box office: $460,000

The Saint Strikes Back is a 1939 American crime film directed by John Farrow. It marks the second cinematic incarnation of the antihero crimefighting character Simon Templar, alias "The Saint". George Sanders replaced Louis Hayward, who had played the Saint in The Saint in New York. The movie was produced by RKO and also featured Wendy Barrie as female gang leader Val Travers. Barrie would appear in two more Saint films, playing different roles each time, though not in the next film in the series, The Saint in London. This was the second of eight films in RKO's film series about The Saint, and the first of five with Sanders in the title role (Hugh Sinclair took over for the final two).

In the film The Saint foils an assassination attempt by a member of Val Travers' gang, but is wanted in connection to the killing before joining the police in their efforts to stop Travers and apprehend a shadowy criminal mastermind. The script was based on the Leslie Charteris novel She Was a Lady (Hodder and Stoughton, 1931) which was also published as Angels of Doom and The Saint Meets His Match. The screenplay was by John Twist, who set the story in San Francisco (the book is set in England). Robert Sisk produced and John Farrow directed.

== Plot ==
While dancing at a San Francisco New Year's party, the Saint spots an agent of Valerie Travers preparing to shoot someone, so Templar guns him down first at the stroke of midnight. Templar is placed by witnesses at the scene, so the San Francisco police request the assistance of Inspector Henry Fernack (Jonathan Hale) of the NYPD. Before Fernack can leave, the Saint arrives in New York and accompanies him to the West Coast.

Travers' father had been a police inspector whose efficiency caused trouble for a mysterious criminal mastermind named Waldeman. When a large sum of money was found in his safe deposit box, however, he was fired on suspicion of working for Waldeman and committed suicide. Travers is determined to clear his name by any means necessary. The Saint takes up her cause, despite her hostility for his interference in her plans and her suspicions about his motives. Templar gets the cooperation of the police commissioner, over the objections of Chief Inspector Webster and criminologist Cullis, who wonder if the Saint is Waldeman himself.

Templar and Travers cross paths again when the trail leads to Martin Eastman, a noted philanthropist and seemingly-irreproachable citizen, whom they both suspect is linked to Waldeman in some way, and who turns out to be the false front for Waldeman's crime ring. Templar forces Travers and her gang to drive away, and aids her burglar, Zipper Dyson, in robbing Eastman's safe of a large sum of money. The serial numbers confirm that it was stolen in a robbery perpetrated by Waldeman. Eastman contacts Cullis instead of reporting the theft, so Templar and Fernack know that Cullis is working for Waldeman. Templar leaves without Fernack to warn Travers before Cullis can murder her (in the belief that she stole the money to expose him), then flees with her after being forced to kill one of Travers' henchmen in self-defense. At that point, Fernack is convinced Templar is Waldeman.

The next morning, Templar replaces the stolen money in Eastman's safe, guaranteeing he will be exposed as Waldeman's front man, though he is killed fleeing his house. That night, Templar and Travers return to his apartment, where Fernack is waiting for them, as Templar expects, and they ultimately lure him to Cullis' apartment, which the police have wired in accord with Templar's trap. Travers tricks Cullis into admitting that he framed her father under the pretense that she will give him the money, while Templar is confronted by Waldeman in the kitchen. Fernack arrives in time to shoot the mastermind dead, and Cullis is arrested by the police, with Travers and Templar parting with her gratitude for Templar's having helped clear her father's name.

== Cast ==
- George Sanders as The Saint/Simon Templar
- Wendy Barrie as Valerie Travers
- Jonathan Hale as Inspector Henry Fernack
- Jerome Cowan as Cullis
- Barry Fitzgerald as Zipper Dyson, a burglar working for Travers
- Neil Hamilton as Allan Breck, Travers' friend and admirer
- Robert Elliott as Chief Inspector Webster
- Russell Hopton as Harry Donnell, another of Travers' gangsters
- Edward Gargan as Pinky Budd, one of Travers' henchmen
- Robert Strange as Police Commissioner
- Gilbert Emery as Martin Eastman
- James Burke as Headquarters Police Officer
- Nella Walker as Mrs. Betty Fernack
- Willie Best as Algernon, Simon's servant

== Production ==
=== Casting George Sanders ===
The Saint in New York (1938) had been a surprise hit for RKO and they decided to turn it into a series. In July 1938 they announced they would make the second in the series, The Saint Strikes Twice. A.C. Edington was assigned to write the script and Louis Hayward was announced as star with filming to start in August 1938.

Hayward was reluctant to reprise his role and was not under contract to RKO. He had just played the lead in The Duke of West Point (1938) and wanted assurances the new film would be more of an "A" movie. Hayward ended up signing a long-term contract with Edward Small and making The Man in the Iron Mask (1939).

RKO ended up casting George Sanders, who they borrowed from 20th Century Fox.

The title was changed to The Saint Strikes Back and it was to be made alongside The Saint in London. John Farrow was assigned to direct in December 1938.

The script was written by John Twist.

=== Shooting ===
Filming started in December 1938.

== Reception ==
The New York Times said the series "found its stride" with this film.
