= The Saint (film series) =

Film series made by RKO Pictures (1938–1941)

The Saint (film series) refers to eight B movies made by RKO Radio Pictures between 1938 and 1941, based on some of the books in British author Leslie Charteris' long-running series about the fictional character Simon Templar, better known as The Saint.

== Overview ==
A few years after creating the character in 1928, Charteris was successful in getting RKO Radio Pictures interested in a film based on one of his books. The first, The Saint in New York, came in 1938 and was based on the 1935 novel of the same name. It starred Louis Hayward as Simon Templar and Jonathan Hale as Inspector Henry Fernack, the American counterpart to the British character, Chief inspector Claud Eustace Teal.

The film was a success and seven more films followed rapidly. They were sometimes based upon outlines by Charteris, while others were based loosely on his novels or novellas. George Sanders took over from Hayward as The Saint in the second film, and starred in a further four between 1939 and 1941. One of the films, The Saint in London (1939), was filmed by RKO's British unit with an American script. Sanders joined the crew on location; the cast was entirely British except for American actor David Burns as The Saint's sidekick.

The British unit made two more films in 1941, The Saint's Vacation and The Saint Meets the Tiger, with Hugh Sinclair taking over as Simon Templar. However, by the time The Saint Meets the Tiger was completed in June 1941, a major dispute ensued between Leslie Charteris and RKO over the upcoming first film in RKO's new Falcon series, The Gay Falcon, due for release in October 1941. Charteris argued that it was a case of copyright infringement, as RKO's version of The Falcon was an obvious copy of his own character, and the fact that the new film starred George Sanders, who personified The Saint after having played him in five of the seven films released up to that point, made this even more obvious. As Charteris explained to author David Zinman in 1971, "RKO switched to The Falcon, a flagrant carbon copy of their version of The Saint, in my opinion with the single mercenary motive of saving the payments they had to make to me for the film rights."

The legal dispute forced RKO to shelve The Saint Meets the Tiger temporarily. The conflict wasn't settled until 1943, with RKO selling the American distribution rights to Republic Pictures, while RKO's British arm handled the UK distribution as originally planned. The film was released in both countries in 1943.

== Films ==
- The Saint in New York (1938) – with Louis Hayward as The Saint
- The Saint Strikes Back (1939) – with George Sanders as The Saint
- The Saint in London (1939) – with George Sanders as The Saint
- The Saint's Double Trouble (1940) – with George Sanders as The Saint
- The Saint Takes Over (1940) – with George Sanders as The Saint
- The Saint in Palm Springs (1941) –with George Sanders as The Saint
- The Saint's Vacation (1941) – with Hugh Sinclair as The Saint
- The Saint Meets the Tiger (produced in 1941 but not released until 1943) – with Hugh Sinclair as The Saint

In the 1930s, RKO also purchased the rights to produce a film adaptation of Saint Overboard, but no such film was ever produced.

A ninth film, The Saint's Return (known as The Saint's Girl Friday in the US) from 1953, with Louis Hayward returning as The Saint, is sometimes regarded as part of the RKO series. However, it was produced by British Hammer Film Productions 12 years after the conflict between Charteris and RKO, based on a special agreement between Hammer Films and Leslie Charteris, which gave Charteris a percentage in the film. RKO acted only as the film's US distributor, six months after the UK release.

== See also ==
- The Saint (1997)
- The Saint (2017)
