= Joy Hodges =

American singer and actress (1915–2003)

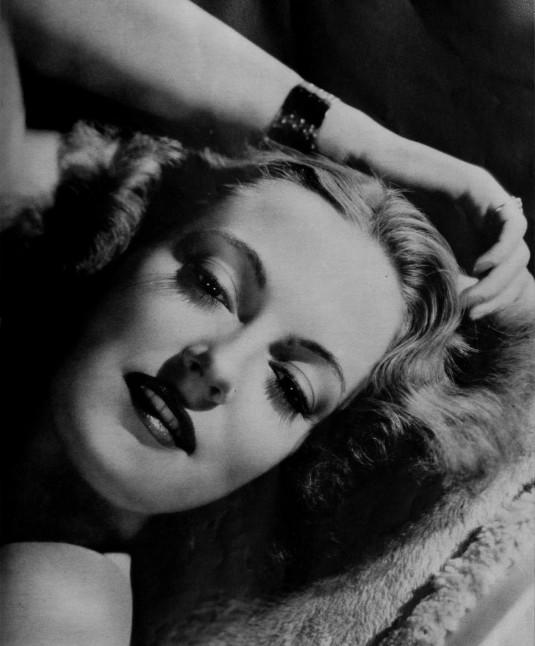
- Joy Hodges (Photoplay, August 1939)
- Born: Frances Eloise Hodges; January 29, 1915; Des Moines, Iowa, U.S.
- Died: January 19, 2003 (aged 87); Palm Desert, California, U.S.
- Occupations: Singer; actress
- Years active: 1935–1963
- Spouse(s): Gilbert H. Doorly (1939-1941, divorce); Paul Dudley Helmund (1942-1952, divorce); Eugene Scheiss (1955-1990, his death)
- Parent(s): Mr. and Mrs. Verne Hodges

Joy Hodges (born Frances Eloise Hodges; January 29, 1915 – January 19, 2003) was an American singer and actress who performed on radio, on film, on Broadway, and with big bands.

== Early years ==
Frances Eloise Hodges was born in Des Moines, Iowa, on January 29, 1915, the daughter of postal worker Verne Hodges and his wife. She was educated at Wallace Elementary, Amos Hiatt Junior High, and East High schools. By the time she was 11 years old, she and friend Ardis Olson had formed the Bluebird Twins singing duo, performing on radio station WHO and in local venues. In high school, Betty Illen joined them to form the Crooning Coeds trio.

== Career ==
Winning a contest at a theater took Hodges to Chicago, where her national career began. From there, she traversed the United States, singing on the radio, in night clubs, with orchestras, and in Chautauqua programs. She performed at the Empire Room and the Hotel Sherman, both in Chicago. One of her early jobs was being the lead singer with Carol Loftner and his orchestra. She also sang with Ted Fio Rito, Ben Bernie, Jimmy Grier, Ozzie Nelson, and Abe Lyman and their orchestras, among others.

Hodges' Broadway credits include Nellie Bly (1945), The Odds on Mrs. Oakley (1944), Dream with Music (1943), and I'd Rather Be Right (1937). In 1972, she replaced Ruby Keeler in the revival of No, No, Nanette on Broadway. Perhaps the most memorable of Hodges' Broadway performances was singing "Have You Met Miss Jones?" in I'd Rather Be Right. She later said, "I became the toast of Broadway and sang the most recognizable song in America at that time — everyone adored Miss Jones."

Her screen debut came in a short, A Night at the Biltmore Bowl, for RKO Pictures, and her first film, after signing with RKO for five years, was Old Man Rhythm (1935). She also made soundies (musical short films) in addition to regular films.

During World War II, Hodges sang with Harry James and his orchestra as they entertained military personnel on USO tours in Europe.

On old-time radio, Hodges was the female singer on The Joe Penner Show on CBS beginning in October 1936. She left that program to make her stage debut in I'd Rather Be Right in November 1937. In 1944, she filled in for Arlene Francis as host of the radio version of Blind Date when it was broadcast from Detroit. She also sang and was co-host, with Durward Kirby, on Honeymoon in New York on NBC in 1946.

== Personal life ==
=== Reagan friendship ===
Hodges and Ronald Reagan had a friendship that lasted six decades, beginning when both of them worked at radio station WHO in Des Moines, Iowa, where she sang and he was an announcer and sportscaster. In 1937, Hodges helped Reagan obtain an interview with an agent, which led to Reagan's receiving a contract from Warner Bros. film studio. Hodges and Reagan also appeared with others in vaudeville shows in the late 1930s. Hodges' obituary in The New York Times noted, "Mr. Reagan kept in touch with Miss Hodges for 60 years, and invited her to the White House when he was president."

=== Marriage ===
In 1935, while Hodges had a contract with Universal Studios, she was insured by Lloyd's of London with a policy that guaranteed her at least $125,000 per year for three years as long as she did not marry during that period. Although she did not wed during that span, she collected nothing because she earned more than the guaranteed amount.

Hodges married Gilbert H. Doorly, a newspaper editor, in Des Moines, Iowa, on September 2, 1939. They had no children and divorced in 1941. On April 24, 1942, she married Paul Dudley Helmund, a radio producer and writer, and that marriage ended in divorce in 1952. Her third marriage, in 1955, was to Eugene Scheiss. He died in 1990.

== Death ==
On January 19, 2003, Hodges died at age 88 in Palm Desert, California, of complications following a stroke. She was buried in the Masonic Cemetery in Des Moines.

== Partial filmography ==
=== Films ===
- Old Man Rhythm (1935)
- To Beat the Band (1935)
- Follow the Fleet (1936)
- Special Agent K-7 (1937)
- Service de Luxe (1938)
- The Family Next Door
- Unexpected Father (1939)
- Laughing at Danger (1940)

=== Soundies ===
- "Exactly Like You" (Soundies Distributing Corporation of America, Inc. Program 1047)
- "Love Me a Little Little" (SDCA Program 1243)
- "Row, Row, Row" (SDCA Program 1119)
- "There I Go"(SDCA Program V-899)
- "We Could Make Such Beautiful Music Together".
- "Why Don't We Do This More Often?" (SDCA Program 1095)
