= Kay Sutton =

American actress (1915–1988)

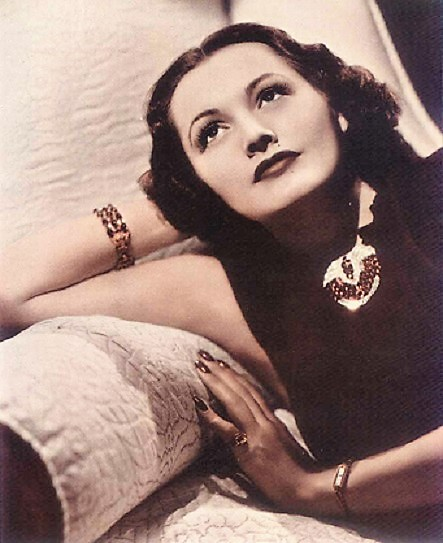
- Sutton in 1938
- Born: Katherine Warburton Sutton; June 14, 1915; Irvington, New Jersey, U.S.
- Died: March 1, 1988 (aged 72); Grosse Point, Michigan, U.S.
- Resting place: Elmwood Cemetery, Detroit
- Occupation: Actress
- Years active: 1935–1964
- Spouses: Edward Cronjager (m. 1935; div. 1937) Clifton Stokes Weaver (m. 1941; div. 1944) Dan Topping (m. 1946; div. 1952) Frederick Moulton Alger (m. 1963; died 1967)
- Children: 3

Katherine Warburton "Kay" Sutton (June 14, 1915 – March 1, 1988) was an American actress.

== Personal life ==
Sutton married Edward Cronjager, a film cameraman, on September 16, 1935. She was married four times, her husbands included Frederick Moulton Alger, Dan Topping (his fourth marriage), In July 1941 Sutton and Cliff Weaver, an actor and Hawaiian sugar planter, eloped and were married in Yuma, Arizona.

== Partial filmography ==
- Roberta (1935) - Fashion Model (uncredited)
- Reckless (1935) - Woman with Paul in Audience (uncredited)
- Old Man Rhythm (1935) - College Girl (uncredited)
- Follow the Fleet (1936) - Telephone Operator (uncredited)
- A Star Is Born (1937) - (uncredited)
- Night Spot (1938) - Allan's Wife (uncredited)
- This Marriage Business (1938) - Bella Lawson
- Vivacious Lady (1938) - Woman Exiting Train at Old Sharon (uncredited)
- The Saint in New York (1938) - Fay Edwards
- Having Wonderful Time (1938) - Camp Guest (uncredited)
- I'm From the City (1938) - Marlene Martindale
- Smashing the Rackets (1938) - Peggy
- Carefree (1938) - Miss Adams
- The Mad Miss Manton (1938) - Gloria Hamilton
- Lawless Valley (1938) - Norma Rogers
- Beauty for the Asking (1939) - Miss Whitman
- Twelve Crowded Hours (1939) - Miss Martin (uncredited)
- The Story of Vernon and Irene Castle (1939) - Girl with Stockbrokers (uncredited)
- S.O.S. Tidal Wave (1939) - Laurel Shannon
- Call a Messenger (1939) - Virginia Phillips (uncredited)
- Man from Montreal (1939) - Myrna Montgomery aka Mrs. Myrna Rawlins
- Balalaika (1939) - Girl at the Balalaika (uncredited)
- The Man Who Talked Too Much (1940) - Mrs. Knight (scenes deleted)
- Laughing at Danger (1940) - Mrs. Inez Morton
- Sky Murder (1940) - Texas O'Keefe (uncredited)
- Li'l Abner (1940) - Wendy Wilecat
- The Bank Dick (1940) - Young Woman on Bench (uncredited)
- A Night at Earl Carroll's (1940) - Girl Attendant (uncredited)
- Maisie Was a Lady (1941) - House Guest (uncredited)
- You're Out of Luck (1941) - Marjorie Overton
- The Trial of Mary Dugan (1941) - Secretary (uncredited)
- Sunny (1941) - Brunette (uncredited)
- Sergeant York (1941) - Saloon Girl (uncredited)
- Flying Blind (1941) - Miss Danila
