= The Family Next Door (1939 film) =

- Directed by: Joseph Santley
- Written by: Mortimer Offner
- Produced by: Max Golden (associate producer)
- Starring: Hugh Herbert; Joy Hodges; Eddie Quillan; Ruth Donnelly
- Cinematography: Milton R. Krasner
- Edited by: Frank Gross
- Music by: Charles Previn
- Production company: Universal Pictures
- Distributed by: Universal Pictures
- Release date: March 31, 1939
- Running time: 60-64 minutes
- Country: United States
- Language: English

The Family Next Door is a 1939 American comedy film starring Hugh Herbert, Joy Hodges, Eddie Quillan and Ruth Donnelly.

== Cast ==
- Hugh Herbert as George Pierce
- Joy Hodges as Laura Pierce
- Eddie Quillan as Sammy Pierce
- Ruth Donnelly as Mrs. Pierce
- Benny Bartlett as Rufus Pierce
- Juanita Quigley as Susan Pierce
- Thomas Beck as Bill Trevis
- Cecil Cunningham as Cora Stewart
- James Bush as Harold Warner
- Frances Robinson as Jane Hughes
- Lillian Yarbo as Blossom
- Dorothy Arnold as Cashier
- Mark Daniels as Bill Dillon (as Stanley Hughes)
