= Saint Overboard =

1936 novel by Leslie Charteris

Saint Overboard also The Pirate Saint
- First edition
- Author: Leslie Charteris
- Language: English
- Series: The Saint
- Genre: Mystery fiction
- Publisher: Hodder and Stoughton
- Publication date: 1936
- Publication place: United Kingdom
- Media type: Print (Hardback & Paperback)
- Preceded by: The Saint in New York
- Followed by: The Ace of Knaves

Saint Overboard is the title of a 1936 mystery novel by Leslie Charteris, one of a long series of novels featuring Charteris' creation Simon Templar, alias "The Saint". An edited version was previously published in November 1935 in The American Magazine as The Pirate Saint. Some paperback editions append the article The to the title (The Saint Overboard).

The book was first published in the United Kingdom by Hodder & Stoughton in 1936 (followed by an American edition by The Crime Club).

== Plot summary ==
Simon Templar, alias The Saint, is enjoying a pleasure cruise along the French coast aboard his yacht, the Corsair when he is awakened in the middle of the night by the sound of gunfire and shouting from another vessel (the Falkenberg) anchored nearby.

The source of the commotion is a group of men pursuing a young woman who is swimming frantically away from the other ship. Templar rescues the woman who, after some considerable hesitation, identifies herself as Loretta Page, a private detective who is investigating the mysterious disappearance of sunken treasure from the Atlantic. When she learns her rescuer is The Saint, she enlists his help in tracking down a group of modern-day pirates. These pirates, led by Kurt Vogel, are using newly developed bathyscape technology to reach the sea floor and scour recent shipwrecks for gold and other booty before officially sanctioned salvage operations arrive. And Vogel is not against committing cold-blooded murder to keep his operation going.

Hampered by Loretta's detective firm superior, who harbors a deep distrust of Templar, as well as Simon's growing love for Loretta, The Saint sets out to stop Vogel's operation. In the process he reunites with some of his colleagues from previous adventures Roger Conway and Peter Quentin. Orace, Templar's longtime manservant, makes his first major appearance since the very first Saint novel, Meet - The Tiger!. And it is Orace who complicates Templar's mission when he accidentally kills one of Vogel's men, which leads to Vogel forcing Templar (on pain of Loretta's possible death) to take the dead man's place on a salvage operation in the Channel Islands.

=== Notes ===
- Aside from the return of Peter Quentin, Roger Conway and Orace, this book also features the first reference to Templar's other partner, Hoppy Uniatz since The Saint Goes On (although Uniatz is not involved in the plot). This is also the first Saint book to suggest a serious relationship between Templar and a woman other than his longtime girlfriend Patricia Holm, who is not mentioned once in this book (she returns in subsequent volumes, however). In the previous novel The Saint in New York Templar expresses affection for Fay Edwards while She Was a Lady has Templar partnering with a female thief named Jill Trelawney, however in both cases Templar indicates that he is not "available" due to his relationship with Holm; no such reference is made in Saint Overboard.
- Some editions contain an introduction by Charteris in which he discusses the diving technology used in the book. The 1963 reprint by Fiction Publishing Company includes a modified version of this introduction in which Charteris apologizes for the outdated technology.
- This is one of the few Saint books to include a map showing the locations of the major events in the book.

== Film adaptation plans ==
The film rights to Saint Overboard were purchased by RKO Studios for adaptation as part of its popular series of Saint movies during the 1940s. Ultimately, however, no such film was ever produced.

== Radio adaptation ==
A one-hour radio play, starring Paul Rhys as the Saint and Patsy Kensit as Loretta Page, was broadcast in 1995.
