= Spring Reunion =

1956 film by Robert Pirosh

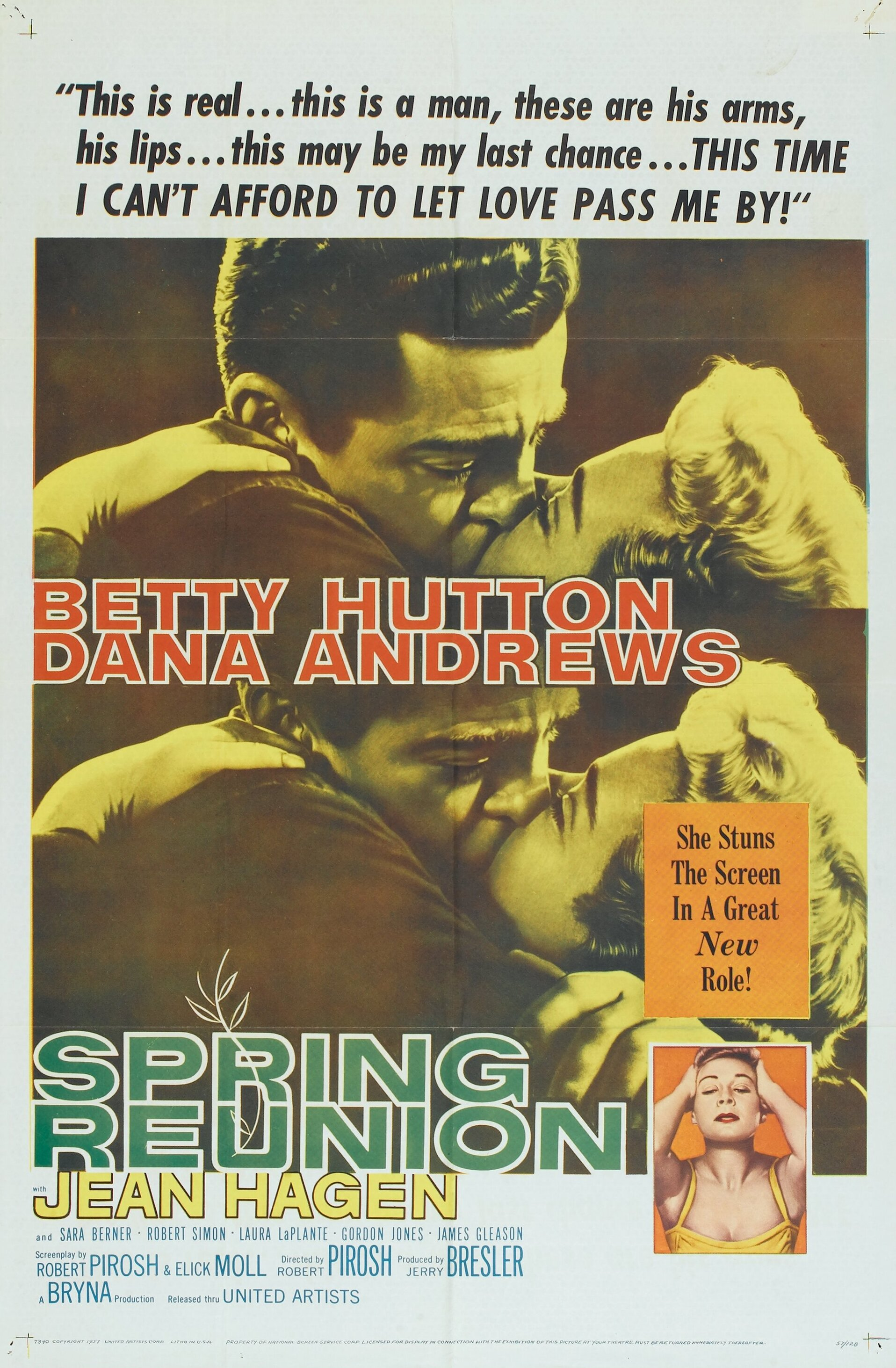
- Theatrical release poster
- Directed by: Robert Pirosh; John E. Burch (assistant)
- Screenplay by: Robert Pirosh; Elick Moll
- Based on: "Spring Reunion" by Robert Alan Aurthur
- Produced by: Jerry Bresler
- Starring: Betty Hutton; Dana Andrews; Jean Hagen
- Cinematography: Harold Lipstein
- Edited by: Leon Barsha
- Music by: Earle Hagen; Herbert W. Spencer
- Production company: Bryna Productions
- Distributed by: United Artists
- Release dates: December 27, 1956 (London); March 8, 1957 (United States)
- Running time: 79 minutes
- Country: United States
- Language: English

Spring Reunion is a 1956 American romance comedy drama film, directed by Robert Pirosh, the film stars Betty Hutton and Dana Andrews, with Jean Hagen, Robert F. Simon, Laura La Plante, Gordon Jones, Sara Berner, Irene Ryan and Herbert Anderson. It was the second film to be produced by Kirk Douglas' film production company Bryna Productions and was released by United Artists. The story is based on a 1954 television play by Robert Alan Aurthur for the Goodyear Television Playhouse.

Spring Reunion centers on the fifteen-year reunion of the fictional Carson High School class of 1941. It was a screen comeback for actress Betty Hutton, her first film in five years since her departure from Paramount Studios in 1952, after the completion of the musical Somebody Loves Me. It was Hutton's last feature film.

== Plot ==
Carson High School is preparing for a fifteen-year reunion of the Carson High class of 1941. Margaret "Maggie" Brewster, who was voted “most popular girl” in the yearbook, runs Brewster Realty Co. in Carson with her father, Harry. While working, Maggie is approached by her former classmate, Barna "Barney" Forrest, who has arrived from out of town. Maggie never married, unlike Barney who sees the reunion as an escape from the antics of her four children and husband, and still lives with her parents, Harry and May. Maggie sets Barney up in her house for the duration of her stay.

Maggie is about to close a deal on the Davis beach house, the home owned by her former classmate and highschool lover, Fred Davis, voted the student “most likely to succeed”. Fred has long since left Carson and Maggie has seldom heard from him in a while. Maggie drives to Fred’s beach house to inspect the property. When she arrives, Maggie reminisces on her relationship with Fred. Suddenly, Fred arrives at the house and tells Maggie that he told the prospector the deal was off and that he wants the house off the market. Fred informs Maggie that he was just passing through Carson on his way to San Francisco, where he was offered a job, and that he doesn’t plan to go to the reunion.

That evening, the reunion takes place at Carson High. To Maggie’s surprise, Fred arrives at the reunion and dances with her. However, Fred, riddled with nostalgia and regrets, promptly leaves the reunion and takes a stroll on the school field. Maggie catches up to Fred and the two go to the old soda shop. Maggie returns to the reunion as she is participating in a recreation of the 1941 graduation concert. Meanwhile, Barney flirts with Carson High football hero Jack Frazer. After the concert, the four drive to Fred’s beach house. After Barney and Jack wander off, Maggie and Fred rekindle their relationship.

Barney returns to the Brewster’s house by herself where she is confronted by Maggie’s parents. Barney reveals that Maggie and Fred are rekindling their relationship. May is elated that her daughter has found someone. On the other hand, Harry has been immensely protective over Maggie since his son, Eddie Brewster, died in World War II. Harry immediately takes to distrusting Fred.

Fred and Maggie go night sailing. Suddenly, the boat begins to leak and Fred rushes the boat to shore. The boat crashes near a lighthouse, where the keeper recognises Fred and takes the couple in. Fred spends the night repairing the boat. As Maggie and Fred prepare to leave, they both realise they love each other.

The next morning Maggie arrives home, where she informs her parents that she and Fred are marrying. Maggie and Fred plan to go to San Francisco, where Fred will begin his new job. Before they leave, Maggie agrees to close out a real estate deal with her father. At the office, Harry catches Fred and attempts to convince him to join the Brewster reality company so that Maggie will stay in Carson. Fred staunchly refuses and leaves, upsetting Maggie. May convinces Maggie to go after Fred and the two drive off together.

== Cast ==
- Betty Hutton as Margaret 'Maggie' Brewster
- Dana Andrews as Fred Davis
- Jean Hagen as Barna Forrest
- Robert F. Simon as Harry Brewster
- Laura La Plante as May Brewster
- Gordon Jones as Jack Frazer
- Sara Berner as Paula Kratz
- Irene Ryan as Miss Stapleton
- Herbert Anderson as Edward
- Richard Shannon as Nick
- Ken Curtis as Al
- Vivi Janiss as Grace
- Mimi Doyle as Alice
- Florence Sundstrom as Mary
- Richard Benedict as Nick
- James Gleason as Mr. 'Collie' Collyer (as Jimmy Gleason)
- Richard Deacon as Sidney (uncredited)
- Don Haggerty as Pete (uncredited)
- Shirley Mitchell as Jane the Receptionist (uncredited)

== Soundtrack ==
- "Spring Reunion" — (Music by Harry Warren and Lyrics by Johnny Mercer) Sung by The Mary Kaye Trio in the opening credits
- "Chopin Nocturne in E Flat Major" — (Composed by Frédéric Chopin)
- "Three Little Fishes" — (Music by Saxie Dowell and Lyrics by Josephine Carringer and Bernice Idins) Performed by Vivi Janiss, Mimi Doyle and Florence Sundstrom
- "That Old Feeling" — (Music by Sammy Fain and Lyrics by Lew Brown) Performed by Betty Hutton

== Production ==
Spring Reunion was one of three B pictures produced by Bryna Productions between 1955 and 1957, alongside The Careless Years and Ride Out For Revenge. The film's promotion centered on it being a return to the screen for Betty Hutton.

Tom Seidel, Jean Hagen's husband, was slated to star as her character’s husband in the film. Filming was slated to start on May 15, 1956. Filming began on June 4, 1956 and ended on July 18, 1956. Location shooting took place at Newport Beach, California.

== Release and reception ==
Spring Reunion premiered at the London Astoria in London on December 27, 1956. The film has its premiere in the United States on March 8, 1957.

Writing in The New York Times, contemporary reviewer A. H. Weiler panned the film, saying, "Although it fleetingly captures the loneliness of some of its principals, it is largely a nostalgia-ridden and unimaginative comedy-drama that makes its points haltingly and without impact. Like the members of Carson High School's class of '41, 'Spring Reunion' tries desperately but fails to make its rosy dreams come alive."

Variety wrote that, "Betty Hutton hasn’t found very auspicious vehicle for her return to the screen after four years absence. “Spring Reunion” is dull comedy-drama, lacking pace and impact. Jerry Bresler, producer of the Bryna presentation through 'United Artists', rounded up a competent cast, but neither the direction by Robert Pirosh nor the script he did with Elick Moll from a story by television's Robert Alan Arthur make good use of the players. The story never seems to get started and, when it does begin to move towards the climax, nothing much happens that's new or freshly treated."
