= George Sanders =

British actor and singer (1906–1972)

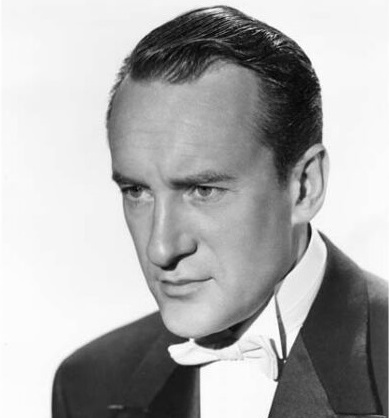
- Sanders in Hangover Square
- Born: 3 July 1906; Saint Petersburg, Russia
- Died: 25 April 1972 (aged 65); Castelldefels, Barcelona, Spain
- Education: Manchester Technical College
- Occupations: Actor; singer
- Years active: 1929–1972
- Spouses: Susan Larson (m. 1940; div. 1949) Zsa Zsa Gabor (m. 1949; div. 1954) Benita Hume (m. 1959; died 1967) Magda Gabor (m. 1970; ann. 1971)
- Partner: Lorraine Chanel (1968–1972)
- Relatives: Tom Conway (brother)
- Awards: Hollywood Walk of Fame

George Henry Sanders (3 July 1906 – 25 April 1972) was a Russian-born British actor and singer whose career spanned over 40 years. His heavy, upper-class English accent and smooth bass voice often led him to be cast as sophisticated but villainous characters. He is remembered for his roles as the wicked Jack Favell in Rebecca (1940), Scott Ffolliott in Foreign Correspondent (1940, a rare heroic part), The Saran of Gaza in Samson and Delilah (1949, the most popular film of the year), theatre critic Addison DeWitt in All About Eve (1950, for which he won the Academy Award for Best Supporting Actor), Sir Brian De Bois-Guilbert in Ivanhoe (1952), King Richard the Lionheart in King Richard and the Crusaders (1954), Mr. Freeze in a two-part episode of Batman (1966), and the voice of Shere Khan in Disney's The Jungle Book (1967). He also starred as Simon Templar, in five of the eight films in The Saint series (1939–1941), and as a suave Saint-like crimefighter in the first four of the sixteen The Falcon films (1941–1942).

== Early life ==
Sanders was born on 3 July 1906 in Saint Petersburg, at number 6 Petrovski Ostrov, to rope manufacturer Henry Sanders and horticulturist Margaret (née Kolbe), who was also born in Saint Petersburg, of mostly German, but also Estonian and Scottish ancestry. (Sanders wrote of his mother's descent from "the Thomas Clayhills of Dundee, who went to Estonia in 1626 to establish a business there".) Sanders referred to his parents as "well-off" and noted his mother's "forebears of solid social position and impeccable respectability", stating that "to the best of (his) knowledge, (his) father came in the mail".

A biography published in 1990 alleged that family members' "recent disclosures... indicate" that Sanders' father was the out-of-wedlock son of a Russian noblewoman of the Tsar's court, and a prince of the House of Oldenburg who was married to a sister of the Tsar. At the time of Henry Sanders' birth, the Anglo-Russian Sanders family were living at Saint Petersburg; the mother, Dagmar, was a lady-in-waiting to the Dowager Empress, and it was said to be through this connection Henry came to be adopted by the Sanders family.

In 1917, at the outbreak of the Russian Revolution, Sanders and his family moved to Great Britain. Like his brother, he attended Bedales School and Brighton College, then went on to Manchester Technical College, after which he worked in textile research.

Sanders travelled to South America, where he managed a tobacco plantation. The Depression sent him back to Britain. He worked at an advertising agency, where the company secretary, aspiring actress Greer Garson, suggested that he take up a career in acting.

== Career ==
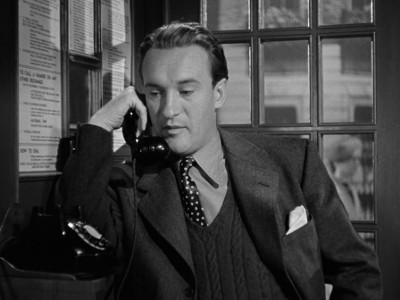
In the trailer for Alfred Hitchcock's Foreign Correspondent (1940)

=== Early British work ===
Sanders learned how to sing and got a role on stage in Ballyhoo, which had only a short run, but helped establish him as an actor.

He began to work regularly on the British stage, appearing several times with Edna Best. He co-starred with Dennis King in The Command Performance.

Sanders travelled to New York to appear on Broadway in a production of Noël Coward's Conversation Piece (1934), directed by Coward, which ran for only 55 performances.

=== Hollywood and 20th Century-Fox ===
20th Century-Fox was looking for an actor to play a villain in its Hollywood-made film Lloyd's of London (1936). Sanders was duly cast as Lord Everett Stacy, opposite Tyrone Power, in one of his first leads, as the hero; Sanders' smooth, upper-class English accent, his sleek manner, and his suave, superior, and somewhat threatening air made him in demand for American films for years to come. Lloyd's of London was a big hit, and in November 1936, Fox placed Sanders under a seven-year contract.

=== Character roles ===
Sanders returned to Hollywood, where RKO wanted him to play the hero in a series of B-movies, The Saint. The Saint in New York (1938) had already been made starring Louis Hayward in the title role, but when he decided not to return to the role, Sanders took over for The Saint Strikes Back (1939). In 1940, Sanders played Jack Favell in Alfred Hitchcock's Rebecca, opposite Laurence Olivier and Joan Fontaine. He worked again with Hitchcock that same year on Foreign Correspondent.

=== A-picture leading man ===
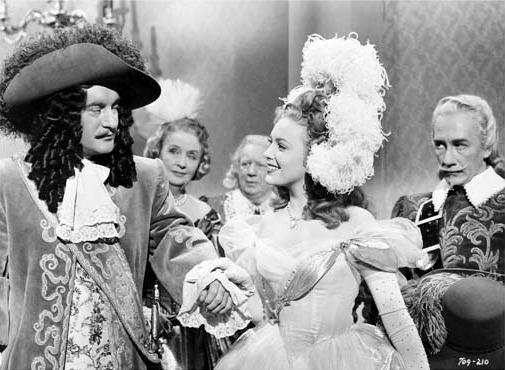
(L–R): George Sanders, Linda Darnell and Richard Haydn in Forever Amber (1947)

Sanders was borrowed by United Artists to play the lead in The Moon and Sixpence (1942), based on the novel by W. Somerset Maugham.

RKO had cancelled its Saint series and replaced it with The Falcon in 1941. George Sanders was assigned the leading role of Gay Laurence, debonair man about town always involved in murder cases. Saint author Leslie Charteris thought the resemblance between the Falcon and the Saint was obvious, and sued the studio for unfair competition. Sanders himself was also unhappy about playing still another screen sleuth in still more "B" pictures, and bowed out of the series in 1942 after only four films. (He was replaced by his elder brother, Tom Conway.)

In July 1942, Fox suspended Sanders for refusing the lead in The Undying Monster. "I like to be seen in pictures that at least seem to be slightly worthwhile." In September, he was again suspended for refusing an "unsympathetic role" in The Immortal Sergeant (he was replaced by Morton Lowry). In November 1942, Fox and Sanders came to terms, with the studio offering him a raise in pay and the lead in a film, School for Saboteurs, which became They Came to Blow Up America.

RKO called him back for This Land Is Mine (1943). They bought an original story for him, Nine Lives, but the film was never made. He was lent to Columbia Pictures for Appointment in Berlin (1943).

In February 1943, Fox announced it was developing three film projects for Sanders – The Porcelain Lady, a murder mystery, plus biopics of Charles Howard, 20th Earl of Suffolk, and a hero of World War II, and Canadian physician Norman Bethune. Fox originally announced that he would play the detective in Laura (1944) alongside Laird Cregar, but neither ended up being in the final film. In 1947, Sanders portrayed King Charles II in Fox's lavish production of the scandalous historical bodice-ripper, Forever Amber.

Sanders signed a new three-film contract with RKO, starting with Action in Arabia (1944). Superficially, the film looked expensive but it was actually a low-budget feature, embellished by spectacular location footage filmed in 1933 for an unfinished production about Lawrence of Arabia.

=== All About Eve and beyond ===
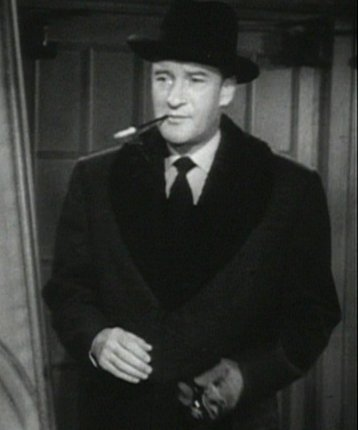
As Addison DeWitt in the trailer for All About Eve (1950)

For his role as the acerbic, cold-blooded theatre critic Addison DeWitt in All About Eve (1950), Sanders won an Academy Award for Best Supporting Actor.

Sanders was leading man in Black Jack (1950), but was back to supporting-villain roles in I Can Get It for You Wholesale (1951). He signed a three-picture deal with Metro-Goldwyn-Mayer where he appeared in The Light Touch (1951) and Ivanhoe (1952), playing Sir Brian de Bois-Guilbert, dying in a duel with Robert Taylor after professing his love for Jewish maiden Rebecca, played by Elizabeth Taylor. It was a huge success.

Sanders went to Italy to appear opposite Ingrid Bergman in Journey to Italy (1954). Back in Hollywood, he made several films for MGM: Jupiter's Darling (1955), Moonfleet (1955), The Scarlet Coat (1955), and The King's Thief (1955) (again as Charles II).

In 1955, Sanders was announced as hosting and occasionally appearing in The Ringmaster, a TV series about the circus.

Sanders played the lead in Death of a Scoundrel (1956) and the TV series The George Sanders Mystery Theater (1957).

He worked one last time with Power on Solomon and Sheba (1959); Power died suddenly during filming and was replaced by Yul Brynner.

In 1960, Sanders ventured into the realm of science fiction/horror, starring in Village of the Damned as a professor who is determined to teach an unusual group of white-haired, glowing-eyed children how to be human.

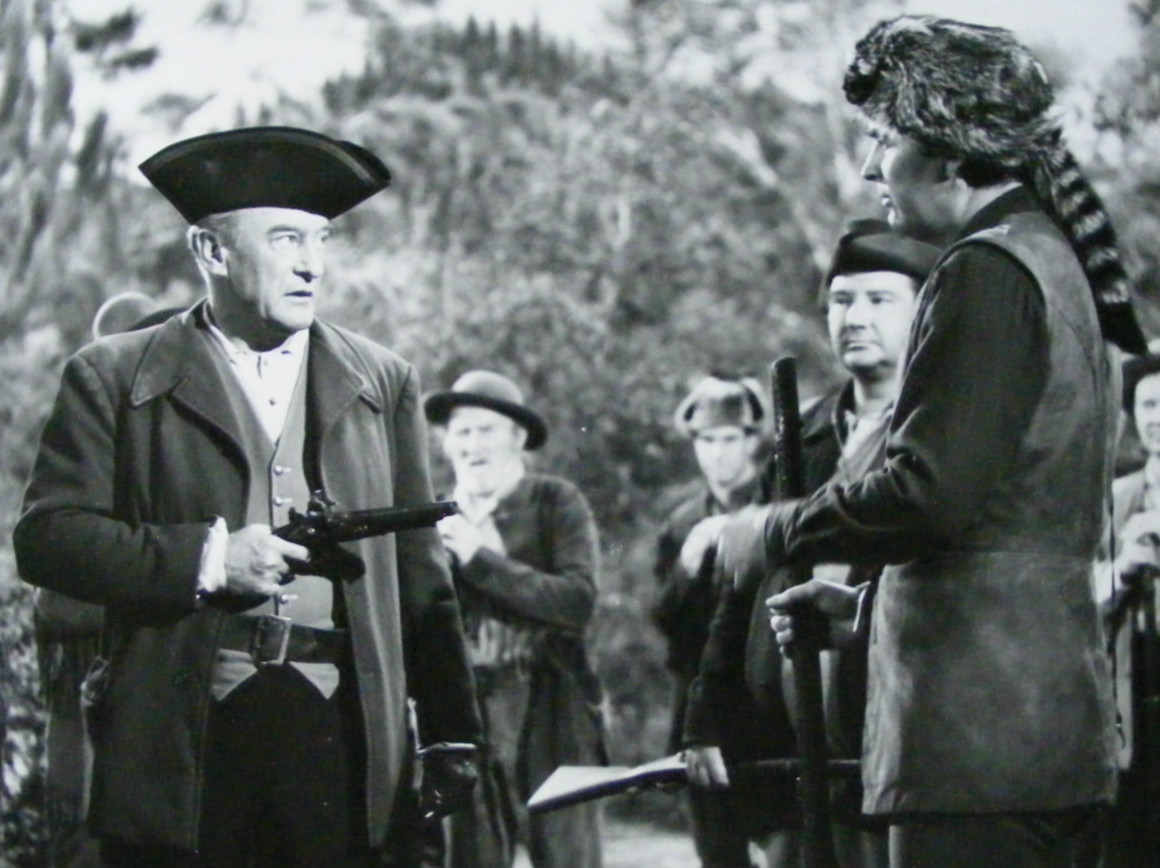
Sanders as guest star on NBC series Daniel Boone, with Fess Parker (1966)

In 1961, he appeared in The Rebel with Tony Hancock before being top-billed in Cairo (1963), then appeared in The Cracksman (1963), Dark Purpose (1964), and The Golden Head (1964). Peter Sellers and Sanders appeared together in The Pink Panther sequel A Shot in the Dark (1964). Sanders had earlier inspired Sellers's character Hercules Grytpype-Thynne in the BBC radio comedy series The Goon Show (1951–60).

In 1966, Sanders declared bankruptcy due to some poor investments.

Sanders was cast in the musical comedy Sherry! but withdrew from the show while it was out-of-town. He was replaced by Clive Revill for Broadway.

=== Final films ===
Sanders appeared briefly in the espionage thriller The Quiller Memorandum (1966), and in the crime-thriller Warning Shot (1967). He followed those up by voicing Shere Khan in Disney's animated film The Jungle Book (1967). He was featured in a quadruple role in the Sonny & Cher vehicle Good Times (1967), William Friedkin's debut film; followed by an eclectic variety of low-budget films, such as The Candy Man (1969) and the campy The Girl from Rio (1969).

In 1969, Sanders announced his retirement from acting. He had a major supporting role in John Huston's The Kremlin Letter (1970), in which his first scene showed him dressed in drag and playing the piano in a gay bar in San Francisco. He also obtained supporting roles in Doomwatch (1972) and Endless Night (1972), the latter being an adaptation of Agatha Christie's novel of the same name. He received top billing for his final film, Psychomania (1973), released posthumously.

=== Novels ===
Two ghostwritten crime novels were published under his name to cash in on his fame at the height of his wartime film series. The first was Crime on My Hands (1944), written in the first person, and mentioning his Saint and Falcon films.

=== Singing and piano playing ===
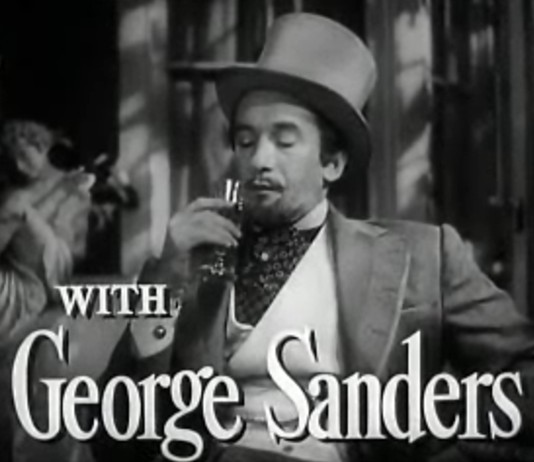
As Lord Henry Wotton in the trailer for The Picture of Dorian Gray (1945)

During the production of The Jungle Book, Sanders was unavailable to provide the singing voice for his character Shere Khan during the final recording of the song "That's What Friends Are For". According to Richard Sherman, Bill Lee, a member of The Mellomen, was called in to substitute for Sanders.

Sanders was an accomplished pianist who maintained his technique for many years. In 1959, while filming The Last Voyage, Life observed him on the set "playing Chopin etudes" during breaks in filming.

== Personal life ==
On 27 October 1940, Sanders married Susan Larson (born Elsie Poole). The couple divorced in 1949. In 1949, Sanders married Zsa Zsa Gabor, with whom he starred in the film Death of a Scoundrel (1956). The couple divorced in 1954. On 10 February 1959, Sanders married Benita Hume, widow of Ronald Colman. She died of bone cancer in 1967, aged 60, the same year that Sanders's brother, Tom Conway, died of liver failure. Sanders had become distant from his brother because of Conway's drinking problem. Sanders' fourth marriage on 4 December 1970 was to Magda Gabor, the older sister of his second wife. This marriage lasted 32 days, ending in an annulment.

In 1942, the Hollywood Women's Press Club awarded Sanders with the Sour Apple Award, given nearly annually to entertainers who have exhibited rude or difficult behaviour on set.

Sanders' autobiography Memoirs of a Professional Cad was published in 1960 and gained critical praise for its wit. Sanders suggested the title A Dreadful Man for his biography, later written by his friend, Brian Aherne, and published in 1979.

== Final years and death ==
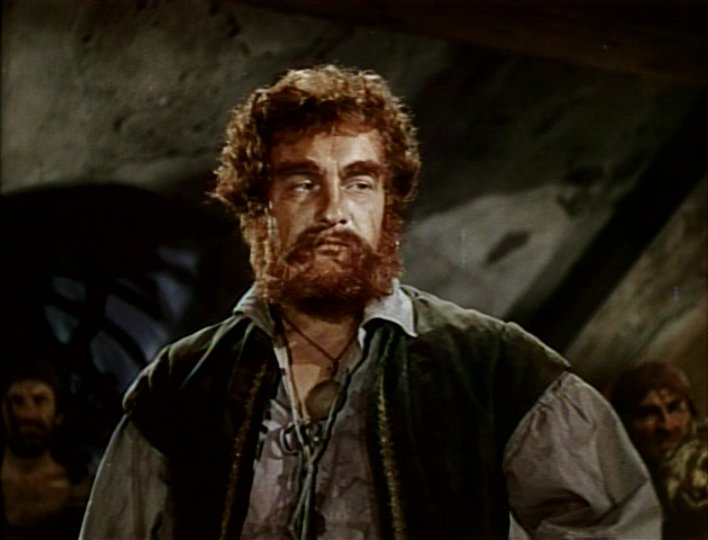
Sanders as Captain Billy Leech in The Black Swan (1942)

By the late 1960s, Sanders had become increasingly reclusive and suffered from depression due to a string of personal losses, including the deaths of his third wife, his mother, and his brother, all within a year. The deaths were followed by a failed investment, which cost Sanders millions of dollars. During the 1960s, he suffered a minor stroke. Sanders could not bear the prospect of losing his health or needing help to carry out everyday tasks, and became severely depressed. He was also drinking heavily. After discovering that he could no longer play his grand piano, he dragged it outside and smashed it with an axe. His last girlfriend, Lorraine Chanel, with whom he had an on-off relationship in the last four years of his life, persuaded him to sell his beloved house in Majorca, Spain, which he later bitterly regretted. From then on, he drifted.

On 23 April 1972, Sanders checked into a hotel in Castelldefels, a coastal town near Barcelona, where he phoned his friend George Mikell. Two days after swallowing the contents of five bottles of the barbiturate Nembutal, he died from cardiac arrest. He left behind two suicide notes, one of which read:

Dear World, I am leaving because I am bored. I feel I have lived long enough. I am leaving you with your worries in this sweet cesspool. Good luck.

David Niven wrote in Bring on the Empty Horses (1975), the second volume of his memoirs that, in 1937, his friend George Sanders had predicted that he, Sanders, would commit suicide from a barbiturate overdose when he was 65, and that in his 50s he had appeared to be depressed because his marriages had failed and several tragedies had befallen him.

Sanders has two stars on the Hollywood Walk of Fame, for films at 1636 Vine Street and television at 7007 Hollywood Boulevard.

== Complete filmography ==
- Love, Life and Laughter (1934) as Singer in Public Bar (uncredited)
- Things to Come (1936) as Pilot (uncredited)
- Strange Cargo (1936) as Roddy Burch
- Find the Lady (1936) as Curly Randall
- The Man Who Could Work Miracles (1936) as Indifference
- Dishonour Bright (1936) as Lisle
- Lloyd's of London (1936) as Lord Everett Stacy
- Love Is News (1937) as Count Andre de Guyon
- Slave Ship (1937) as Lefty
- The Lady Escapes (1937) as Rene Blanchard
- Lancer Spy (1937) as Baron Kurt von Rohback / Lt. Michael Bruce
- International Settlement (1938) as Del Forbes
- Four Men and a Prayer (1938) as Wyatt Leigh
- Mr. Moto's Last Warning (1939) as Eric Norvel
- The Outsider (1939) as Anton Ragatzy
- So This Is London (1939) as Dr. de Reseke
- The Saint Strikes Back (1939) as Simon Templar / The Saint
- Confessions of a Nazi Spy (1939) as Schlager
- The Saint in London (1939) as Simon Templar / The Saint
- Nurse Edith Cavell (1939) as Capt. Heinrichs
- Allegheny Uprising (1939) as Capt. Swanson
- The Saint's Double Trouble (1940) as Simon Templar aka The Saint / 'Boss' Duke Bates
- Green Hell (1940) as Forrester
- The House of the Seven Gables (1940) as Jaffrey Pyncheon
- Rebecca (1940) as Jack Favell
- The Saint Takes Over (1940) as Simon Templar / The Saint
- Foreign Correspondent (1940) as Scott ffolliott
- Bitter Sweet (1940) as Baron von Tranisch
- The Son of Monte Cristo (1940) as Gen. Gurko Lanen
- The Saint in Palm Springs (1941) as Simon Templar / The Saint
- Rage in Heaven (1941) as Ward Andrews
- Man Hunt (1941) as Major Quive-Smith
- Sundown (1941) as Coombes
- The Gay Falcon (1941) as Gay Laurence / The Falcon
- A Date with the Falcon (1942) as Gay Laurence / The Falcon
- Son of Fury: The Story of Benjamin Blake (1942) as Sir Arthur Blake
- The Falcon Takes Over (1942) as Gay Lawrence / The Falcon
- Her Cardboard Lover (1942) as Tony Barling
- Tales of Manhattan (1942) as Williams
- The Falcon's Brother (1942) as Gay Lawrence / The Falcon
- The Moon and Sixpence (1942) as Charles Strickland
- The Black Swan (1942) as Capt. Billy Leech
- Quiet Please, Murder (1942) as Jim Fleg
- This Land Is Mine (1943) as George Lambert
- They Came to Blow Up America (1943) as Carl Steelman / Ernst Reiter
- Appointment in Berlin (1943) as Wing Cmdr. Keith Wilson
- Paris After Dark (1943) as Dr. Andre Marbel
- The Lodger (1944) as Inspector John Warwick
- Action in Arabia (1944) as Michael Gordon
- Summer Storm (1944) as Fedor Mikhailovich Petroff
- Hangover Square (1945) as Dr. Allan Middleton
- The Picture of Dorian Gray (1945) as Lord Henry Wotton
- The Strange Affair of Uncle Harry (1945) as Harry Melville Quincey
- A Scandal in Paris (1946) as Eugène François Vidocq
- The Strange Woman (1946) as John Evered
- The Private Affairs of Bel Ami (1947) as Georges Duroy
- The Ghost and Mrs. Muir (1947) as Miles Fairley
- Lured (1947) as Robert Fleming
- Forever Amber (1947) as King Charles II
- The Fan (1949) as Lord Robert Darlington
- Samson and Delilah (1949) as The Saran of Gaza
- All About Eve (1950) as Addison DeWitt
- Black Jack (1950) as Mike Alexander
- I Can Get It for You Wholesale (1951) as J.F. Noble
- The Light Touch (1951) as Felix Guignol
- Ivanhoe (1952) as De Bois-Guilbert
- Assignment – Paris! (1952) as Nicholas Strang
- Call Me Madam (1953) as General Cosmo Constantine
- Witness to Murder (1954) as Albert Richter
- King Richard and the Crusaders (1954) as King Richard I
- Journey to Italy (Viaggio in Italia) (1954) as Alexander 'Alex' Joyce
- Jupiter's Darling (1955) as Fabius Maximus
- Moonfleet (1955) as Lord Ashwood
- The Scarlet Coat (1955) as Dr. Jonathan Odell
- The King's Thief (1955) as Charles II
- Never Say Goodbye (1956) as Victor
- While the City Sleeps (1956) as Mark Loving
- That Certain Feeling (1956) as Larry Larkin
- Death of a Scoundrel (1956) as Clementi Sabourin
- The Seventh Sin (1957) as Tim Waddington
- Rock-A-Bye Baby (1958) as Danny Poole (1959) (scenes cut)
- The Whole Truth (1958) as Carliss
- From the Earth to the Moon (1958) as Stuyvesant Nicholl
- That Kind of Woman (1959) as A.L.
- Solomon and Sheba (1959) as Adonijah
- A Touch of Larceny (1960) as Sir Charles Holland
- The Last Voyage (1960) as Captain Robert Adams
- Bluebeard's Ten Honeymoons (1960) as Henri Landru
- Cone of Silence (1960) as Sir Arnold Hobbes
- Village of the Damned (1960) as Gordon Zellaby
- The Rebel (aka, Call Me Genius, 1961) as Sir Charles Brewer
- Five Golden Hours (1961) as Mr. Bing
- Rendezvous (1961) as J.K. / Kellermann
- Operation Snatch (1962) as Maj. Hobson
- In Search of the Castaways (1962) as Thomas Ayerton
- Cairo (1963) as The Major
- The Cracksman (1963) as Guv'nor
- Dark Purpose (1964) as Raymond Fontaine
- The Golden Head (1964) as Basil Palmer
- A Shot in the Dark (1964) as Benjamin Ballon
- Last Plane to Baalbeck (1965) as Prince Makowski
- The Golden Head (1965) as Basil Palmer
- The Amorous Adventures of Moll Flanders (1965) as The Banker
- Trunk to Cairo (1965) as Professor Schlieben
- The Quiller Memorandum (1966) as Gibbs
- Witchdoctor in Tails as the narrator (1966)
- Warning Shot (1967) as Calvin York
- Good Times (1967) as Mordicus / Knife McBlade / White hunter / Zarubian
- The Jungle Book (1967) as Shere Khan, the Tiger (voice)
- Laura (1968 TV movie) as Waldo Lydecker
- King of Africa (1968) as Captain Walter Phillips
- The Candy Man (1969) as Sidney Carter
- The Girl from Rio (1969) as Masius
- The Body Stealers (1969) as General Armstrong
- The Best House in London (1969) as Sir Francis Leybourne
- The Kremlin Letter (1970) as Warlock
- Rendezvous with Dishonour (1970) as General Downes
- Doomwatch (1972) as The Admiral – Sir Geoffrey
- Endless Night (1972) as Andrew Lippincott (released posthumously)
- Psychomania (1973) as Shadwell (final film role, released posthumously)

== Television ==
- Screen Directors Playhouse (1956) as Charles Ferris / Baron
- Ford Star Jubilee "You're the Top" (1956)
- The George Sanders Mystery Theater (1957)
- What's My Line? 15 September 1957 (Episode No. 380) (season 9, episode 3) Mystery Guest
- The Rogues (1965) as Leonard Carvel
- Voyage to the Bottom of the Sea - "The Traitor" (1965) as Fenton
- The Man From U.N.C.L.E. - "The Gazebo in the Maze Affair" and "The Yukon Affair" (1965) as G. Emory Partridge
- Daniel Boone (1966) as Col. Roger Barr
- Batman (1966) as Mr. Freeze
- Laura (1968 tv movie) as Waldo Lydecker
- Mission: Impossible - "The Merchant" (1971) as Armand Anderssarian

== Broadway ==
- Conversation Piece, at the 44th Street Theatre, 1934

== See also ==
- List of Academy Award winners and nominees from Great Britain
- List of actors with Academy Award nominations
- List of British actors

Husband of a Gabor Sister
Preceded by Conrad Hilton	Zsa Zsa – Third; 2 April 1949 – 2 April 1954; Divorced	Succeeded by Herbert Hutner
Preceded by Tony Gallucci	Magda – Fifth; 5 December 1970 – 6 January 1971; Annulled	Succeeded by Tibor Heltai
Acting roles
Preceded by Louis Hayward	Simon Templar Actor; 1939–1941	Succeeded by Hugh Sinclair
Preceded by David Farrar	Charles II Actor; 1955	Succeeded by Gary Raymond
New title	Mr. Freeze Actor; 1966	Succeeded by Otto Preminger
