= Blue Monday Jamboree =

American old-time radio variety program

- Genre: Variety show
- Country of origin: United States
- Language(s): English
- Home station: KFRC
- Syndicates: Don Lee Network; CBS
- Announcer: Harrison Holliway
- Original release: January 24, 1927 – 1935

Blue Monday Jamboree is an old-time radio variety program in the United States. It was broadcast initially (beginning January 24, 1927) on KFRC in San Francisco, California, then was distributed on the West Coast by the Don Lee Network and was later carried nationwide on CBS. Bill Oates wrote, in his biography of Meredith Willson, that the program was "one of the most popular West Coast originated radio shows in the early 1930s."

== Format ==
Radio historian John Dunning wrote that the program was "known in the West as 'the daddy of all variety shows.'" Blue Monday Jamboree "contained music, comedy and a dramatic sketch (a detective story)."

A contemporary newspaper article (August 27, 1928, in the Oakland Tribune) described a typical broadcast as follows:

Light entertainment will be the order of the evening on the bay city stations with frolics in evidence at many of the stations. Chief among these in point of seniority and general quality is the KFRC Blue Monday Jamboree which is attended by most of the entertainers appearing on the station throughout the week. These artists gather in an informal sort of meeting bandying jests and songs from 8 to 10 p.m.

== Personnel ==
The initial version of Blue Monday Jamboree in 1927 was hosted by Harry McClintock—who also provided music via "Mac's Haywire Orchestry"—and featured soprano Juliette Dunne, as well as baritone Harvey Austin and the KFRC Hawaiians. Meredith Willson made his radio debut on the program in 1928. Another notable latecomer was Al Pearce; later still, he starred in the show's KRFC spinoff, Happy Go Lucky Hour, which eventually moved to NBC, as Al Pearce and His Gang. Other members of the troupe included Bea Benaderet, Elvia Allman (who also ended up on the Pierce-hosted, NBC-destined spin-off), blues singers Jane Green and Midge Williams, pianist Edna Fischer, baritone Ronald Graham, and harmonicist Johnny O'Brien. I Love Lucy creator Jess Oppenheimer earned his first-ever professional paycheck in 1934 for a comedy routine he wrote and performed on Blue Monday Jamboree. Oppenheimer writes extensively about the program in his memoir, Laughs, Luck...and Lucy, including his memorable recreation of KFRC General Manager Harrison Holliway's all too impactful on-air interview with a railroad engineer.
