= The Ace of Knaves =

1937 book by Leslie Charteris

- First edition (UK)
- Author: Leslie Charteris
- Language: English
- Series: The Saint
- Genre: Mystery fiction
- Publisher: Hodder & Stoughton (UK); The Crime Club (US)
- Publication date: 1937
- Publication place: United Kingdom
- Media type: Print (hardback & paperback)
- Preceded by: Saint Overboard
- Followed by: Thieves' Picnic

The Ace of Knaves is a collection of three mystery novellas by Leslie Charteris, first published in the United Kingdom in 1937 by Hodder and Stoughton, and in the United States by The Crime Club. This book continues the adventures of Charteris' creation, Simon Templar, alias The Saint. Later editions of the book were retitled The Saint in Action. The adventures in this book mark the return of Templar's longtime girlfriend and partner Patricia Holm and his nemesis, Chief Inspector Claud Eustace Teal since The Saint Goes On.

Two of the three novellas were first published in Thriller magazine several months before the book was released; this marked the return of the character to the magazine after a hiatus during which Charteris focused on writing novels.

== Stories ==
The book consists of the following stories:

1. The Spanish War - A 10 pound debt turns into a mystery involving $30,000 in bearer bonds, a dead body, and a connection to the (then-current) Spanish Civil War.
2. The Unlicensed Victuallers - When Templar and his crew pursue a liquor-smuggling racket, their mission becomes complicated when they discover a beautiful blonde is somehow caught up in it and Templar becomes concerned that she is somehow connected to a murder.
3. The Beauty Specialist - The Saint is suspected of being "The Z-Man", a mysterious figure who is blackmailing a trio of movie starlets. It's up to Simon and Patricia Holm to protect the women until the blackmailer's real identity is revealed.

== Television adaptations ==
All three stories were adapted as episodes of The Saint TV series.

"The Beauty Specialist" was retitled "Marcia" and aired on 24 October 1963, as part of the second season. "The Spanish War" was retitled "The Work of Art" and aired on 31 October 1963, as part of the second season. "The Unlicensed Victuallers" was retitled "The Hi-Jackers" and aired on 17 December 1964, as part of the third season.

== Publication history ==
Two of the three novellas were first published in Thriller magazine under different titles:

- "The Spanish War" - 13 February 1937 (as "The Return of the Saint")
- "The Beauty Specialist" - 28 March 1937 (as "The 'Z' Man")
