= Ronald Graham (actor) =

Scottish born actor and singer

- Born: Maurice John Ronald Graham; August 16, 1911; Hamilton, Scotland, United Kingdom
- Died: July 4, 1950 (aged 38); New York City, New York, United States
- Education: University of California
- Occupations: Vaudevillian performer; musical theatre actor; singer; film actor; radio personality
- Years active: 1931–1950
- Spouse: Florence Sundstrom

Ronald Graham (August 16, 1911 – July 4, 1950) was a Scottish born actor and singer who had a career performing in American radio, film, and theater from the early 1930s until his death in 1950. After winning a national singing competition, he became a regular performer on the radio program Blue Monday Jamboree from 1931 to 1935. He is best remembered for his many appearances in Broadway musicals from 1937 to 1944; notably creating roles in the original productions of works by Richard Rodgers, Lorenz Hart, Cole Porter, and Arthur Schwartz.

== Life and career ==
Born Maurice John Ronald Graham in Hamilton, Scotland, Graham moved to the United States with his family at the age of 10. He was educated at the University of California where he was trained as a baritone, and was a member of the theatrical group The Players. In 1931 he married Edna O'Keefe; they divorced in 1939.

Graham began his career in 1931 as a singer on radio in San Francisco after winning the Atwater Kent Prize, a national singing competition. He was a regular performer on the radio program Blue Monday Jamboree. In 1933 he appeared in vaudeville productions at the Golden Gate Theatre. He made his film debut in 1935 as Ronald in Old Man Rhythm. His other film credits include a featured singer in To Beat the Band (1935) and Dr. Hugh Mayberry in Ladies of Washington (1944).

Graham made his Broadway debut in 1937 as Colonel Richard Fairfax in Arthur Schwartz's Virginia. He appeared regularly in Broadway over the next decade, starring in Richard Rodgers and Lorenz Hart's The Boys from Syracuse (1938–1939, as Antipholus of Ephesus), Cole Porter's Du Barry Was a Lady (1939–1940, as Alex Barton), Rodgers and Hart's By Jupiter (1942–1943, as Theseus), and Clay Warnick's Dream With Music (1944). His other theatre performances included a portrayal of Gaylord Ravenal in Jerome Kern and Oscar Hammerstein II's Show Boat with The Municipal Opera Association of St. Louis in 1938. During World War II, he volunteered his talents at the American Theatre Wing's Stage Door Canteen to entertain American troops.

In 1944 Graham replaced Alfred Drake as the host of the CBS Radio program Broadway Matinee. In the late 1940s he was active in regional theatre, and appeared in variety programs on American television and radio.

He married the actress Florence Sundstrom on December 20, 1940. He died in New York City on July 4, 1950, one week after a heart attack.
