= Thieves' Picnic =

1937 novel by Leslie Charteris

Thieves' Picnic also The Saint Bids Diamonds also The Saint at the Thieves' Picnic
- First edition
- Author: Leslie Charteris
- Language: English
- Series: The Saint
- Genre: Mystery novel
- Publisher: Hodder and Stoughton
- Publication date: 1937
- Publication place: United Kingdom
- Media type: Print (Hardback & Paperback)
- Pages: 320 pp
- Preceded by: The Ace of Knaves
- Followed by: Prelude for War

Thieves' Picnic is a mystery novel by Leslie Charteris featuring his Robin Hood-inspired crime fighter, Simon Templar, alias "The Saint". The book was first published in the United Kingdom in 1937 by Hodder and Stoughton, and in the United States by The Crime Club the same year. Later editions of the book were retitled The Saint Bids Diamonds; another alternate title is The Saint at the Thieves' Picnic.

== Plot summary ==
After Simon Templar intercepts a mysterious message intended for a jewel-smuggling ring during a trip to Spain, he and his sidekick Hoppy Uniatz follow the message's trail to Tenerife, Canary Islands where they rescue an elderly Dutch diamond cutter and his daughter from being beaten to death.

Templar learns that the old man is a reluctant member of the smuggling ring and, assisted by the daughter, sets out to bring down the gang. Things become more complicated when Templar learns that the man had been in possession of a lottery ticket worth the equivalent of $2 million, and that this ticket is now missing. So not only does The Saint have to rescue the diamond cutter and his daughter from the smuggling ring, he also has to track down the missing lottery ticket, which has sparked instability within the gang. Soon after, Hoppy and the diamond cutter go missing.

Templar, using his frequent "Sebastian Tombs" cover name, infiltrates the gang, posing as a freelance diamond cutter who is hired to replace the old man. (This despite the fact that Templar hasn't the slightest idea as to how to cut diamonds.) From within the gang, Templar plans to start the members double-crossing each other, but finds his work is already half done thanks to that missing lottery ticket.

Some later editions of this book include an afterword entitled "The Last Word" in which Charteris invites readers to join The Saint Club, a fan club that he founded in the 1930s. The annual dues for the club, Charteris writes, went to support the Arbour Youth Club located in east London, which at the time Charteris composed "The Last Word" was still recovering from the Blitz of World War II.

== Television adaptation ==
Thieves' Picnic was adapted as an episode of the TV series The Saint as "The Saint Bids Diamonds". The episode aired during the fourth season on 12 August 1965. It was one of the few full novels used as source material for the series.
