= S.O.S. Tidal Wave =

1939 film by John H. Auer

- Theatrical release poster
- Directed by: John H. Auer
- Screenplay by: Gordon Kahn; Maxwell Shane
- Story by: James Webb
- Produced by: Armand Schaefer
- Starring: Ralph Byrd; George Barbier; Kay Sutton; Frank Jenks; Marc Lawrence; Dorothy Lee
- Cinematography: Jack A. Marta
- Edited by: Ernest J. Nims
- Production company: Republic Pictures
- Distributed by: Republic Pictures
- Release date: June 2, 1939
- Running time: 62 minutes
- Country: United States
- Language: English

S.O.S. Tidal Wave is a 1939 American crime film directed by John H. Auer and written by Gordon Kahn and Maxwell Shane. The film stars Ralph Byrd, George Barbier, Kay Sutton, Frank Jenks, Marc Lawrence and Dorothy Lee. It was released on June 2, 1939 by Republic Pictures.

== Plot ==
Reporter Jeff Shannon stops trying to expose political corruption after his son and wife are threatened. On election day, corrupt politicians broadcast the 1933 apocalyptic science-fiction film Deluge on the news, hoping to trick voters into believing that New York City has been hit by a tidal wave to discourage them from voting.

== Cast ==
- Ralph Byrd as Jeff Shannon
- George Barbier as Uncle Dan Carter
- Kay Sutton as Laurel Shannon
- Frank Jenks as Peaches Jackson
- Marc Lawrence as Melvin Sutter
- Dorothy Lee as Mable
- Oscar O'Shea as Mike Halloran
- Mickey Kuhn as Buddy Shannon
- Ferris Taylor as Clifford Farrow
- Don "Red" Barry as Curley Parsons
- Raymond Bailey as Roy Nixon

== Production ==
Republic Pictures acquired the rights to the 1933 disaster film Deluge, which begins with a special-effects sequence of Manhattan being destroyed by a tsunami.
