= You're Out of Luck =

1941 film

- Theatrical release poster
- Directed by: Howard Bretherton
- Screenplay by: Edmond Kelso
- Story by: Edmond Kelso
- Produced by: Lindsley Parsons
- Starring: Frankie Darro; Kay Sutton; Mantan Moreland; Vickie Lester; Richard Bond; Janet Shaw
- Cinematography: Fred Jackman Jr.
- Edited by: Jack Ogilvie
- Music by: Edward J. Kay
- Production company: Monogram Pictures
- Distributed by: Monogram Pictures
- Release date: January 20, 1941
- Running time: 60 minutes
- Country: United States
- Language: English

You're Out of Luck is a 1941 American comedy film directed by Howard Bretherton and written by Edmond Kelso. The film stars Frankie Darro, Kay Sutton, Mantan Moreland, Vickie Lester, Richard Bond and Janet Shaw. The film was released on January 20, 1941, by Monogram Pictures.

== Plot ==
Frankie and Jeff are working in an apartment building when one of the guests is murdered, then Frankie's brother Tom turns out to be the detective in charge of the case. Tom asks the duo to keep an eye to a suspect living in the building, however they end up getting more involved than they should.

== Cast ==
- Frankie Darro as Frankie O'Reilly
- Kay Sutton as Marjorie Overton
- Mantan Moreland as Jeff Jefferson
- Vickie Lester as Sonya Varney
- Richard Bond as Tom O'Reilly
- Janet Shaw as Joyce Dayton
- Tris Coffin as Dick Whitney
- Willy Castello as Johnny Burke
- Alfred Hall as Mr. Haskell
- Paul Maxey as Pete
- Ralph Peters as Mulligan
- Paul Bryar as Benny
- Jack Mather as Hymie
- Gene O'Donnell as Hal Dayton
- William E. Snyder as Jack

== Bibliography ==
- Fetrow, Alan G. Feature Films, 1940-1949: a United States Filmography. McFarland, 1994.
