= Laughing at Danger (1940 film) =

1940 film

- Theatrical release poster
- Directed by: Howard Bretherton
- Screenplay by: George Waggner; John W. Krafft
- Story by: George Waggner
- Produced by: Lindsley Parsons
- Starring: Frankie Darro; Joy Hodges; George F. Houston; Mantan Moreland; Kay Sutton; Guy Usher
- Cinematography: Fred Jackman Jr.
- Edited by: Jack Ogilvie
- Production company: Monogram Pictures
- Distributed by: Monogram Pictures
- Release date: August 12, 1940
- Running time: 63 minutes
- Country: United States
- Language: English

Laughing at Danger is a 1940 American crime film directed by Howard Bretherton and written by George Waggner and John W. Krafft. The film stars Frankie Darro, Joy Hodges, George F. Houston, Mantan Moreland, Kay Sutton and Guy Usher. The film was released on August 12, 1940, by Monogram Pictures.

== Cast ==
- Frankie Darro as Frankie Kelly
- Joy Hodges as Mary Baker
- George F. Houston as Dan Haggerty
- Mantan Moreland as Jefferson
- Kay Sutton as Mrs. Inez Morton
- Guy Usher as Alvin Craig
- Lillian Elliott as Mrs. Kelly
- Veda Ann Borg as Celeste
- Betty Compson as Mrs. Van Horn
- Rolfe Sedan as Pierre
- Maxine Leslie as Florence
- Ralph Peters as Dugan
- Gene O'Donnell as Chuck Benson
