= Florence Sundstrom =

American actress (1918–2001)

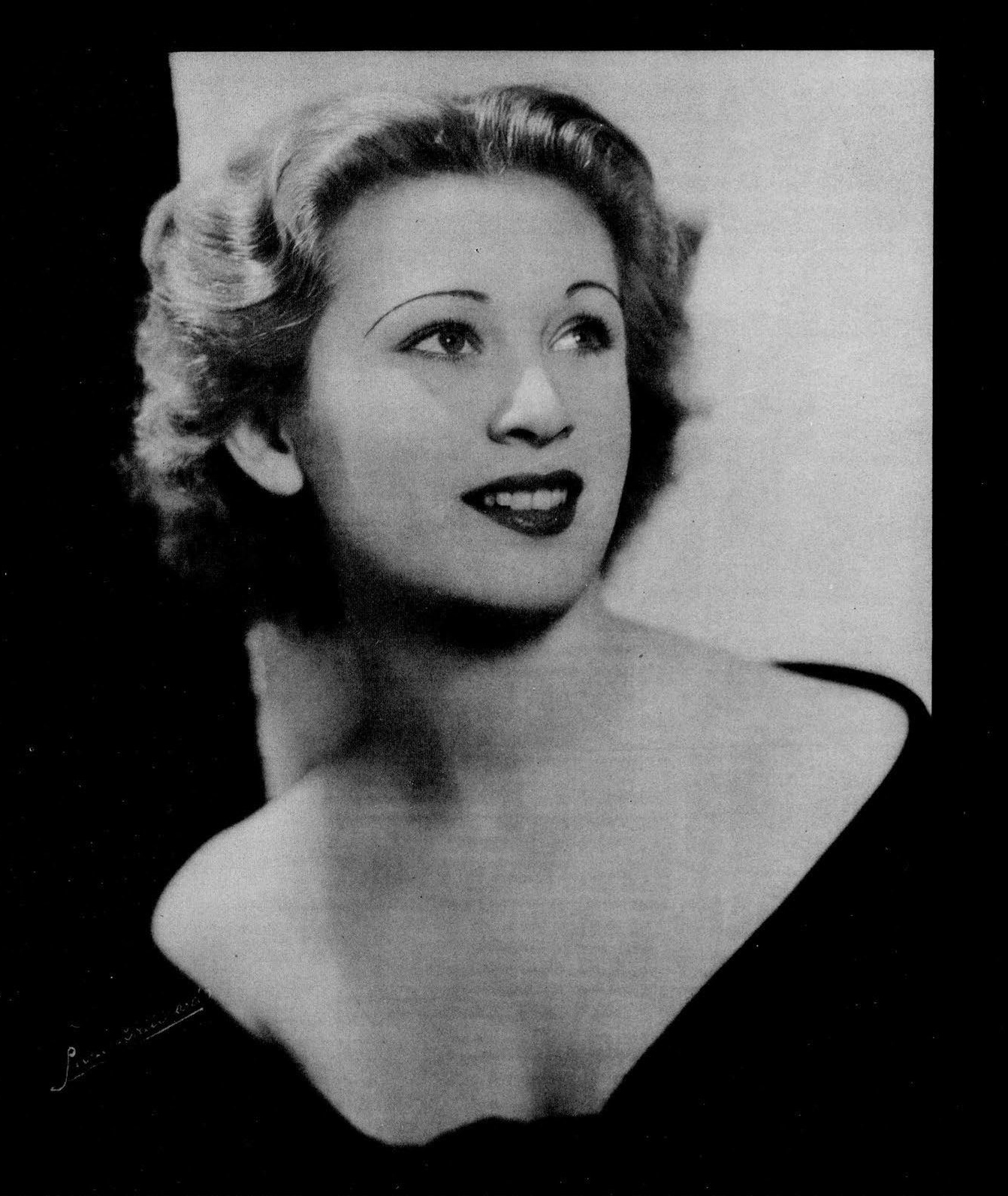
- Sundstrom in 1937
- Born: Florence E. Sundstrom; February 9, 1918; New York City, New York, U.S.
- Died: June 25, 2001 (aged 83); Los Angeles, California, U.S.
- Occupation: Actress
- Years active: 1938–1999
- Spouse: Ronald Graham (died 1950)

Florence E. "Flo" Sundstrom (February 9, 1918 – June 25, 2001) was an American actress who had an active career in theatre, television, and film. A prominent character actress on Broadway from 1936 to 1959, she notably created the roles of Bella in the world premiere of Anita Loos's Happy Birthday in 1946, Bessie in the world premiere of Tennessee Williams's The Rose Tattoo in 1951, and Mrs. Marie "Fatty" Pert in Ketti Frings's Look Homeward, Angel in 1957. She made her film debut as Flora in the film adaptation of The Rose Tattoo in 1955, and thereafter remained active as a character actress in American television and film into the 1990s. She was a main cast member in the 1955–1956 season of The Life of Riley, portraying a new neighbor of the Riley family.

== Life and career ==
Florence E. Sundstrom was born February 9, 1918, in New York City, the younger of two daughters of U.S. Navy Captain Einar William Sundstrom and Jetta Marie (Osmundsen) Sundstrom. She was educated at Great Neck High School, and studied acting, music, and dance in New York and Galveston, Texas, where she made her stage debut in 1922.

She made her Broadway debut as a replacement in Parnell during its 1935–1936 run at the Ethel Barrymore Theatre, and was an opening cast member as Vivian Caldwell in Henry R. Misrock's Bright Honor at the 48th Street Theatre (September 27, 1936). She starred as a character actress in numerous plays on Broadway through 1959, including Chester Erskine's The Good (Oct 1938, as Rose Dubrowski), Irwin Shaw's Retreat to Pleasure (1940 -1941, as Lenore Trilling), Charles MacArthur's Johnny on a Spot (1942, as Barbara Webster), Frank Tarloff's They Should Have Stood in Bed (1942, as Vivian Lowe), Milton Lazarus's The Sun Field (1942, as Karyl Dumont), Robert Stolz's Mr. Strauss Goes to Boston (1945, as Pepi), Stanley Richards's Marriage Is for Single People (1945, as Lily Packer), Anita Loos's Happy Birthday (1946–1948, as Bella), Fay Kanin's Goodbye, My Fancy (1948–1949, as Ellen Griswold), Tennessee Williams's The Rose Tattoo (1951, as Bessie), Mary Helen Fay's Faithfully Yours (1951, as Gracie), N. Richard Nash's See the Jaguar (1952, as Mrs. Meeker), and Ketti Frings's Look Homeward, Angel (1957–1959, as Mrs. Marie "Fatty" Pert).

In film Sundstrom appeared in The Rose Tattoo (1955, as Flora, The Vagabond King (1956, as Laughing Margot), Spring Reunion (1957, as Mary), Bachelor in Paradise (1961, as Mrs. Pickering), The Last Challenge (1967, as Outdoors), The World's Greatest Lover (1977, as Aunt Tillie), Stitches (1985, as a maid), and Pacific Heights (1990, as Mrs. Thayer).

Sundstrom joined the main cast of the television series The Life of Riley for the 1955–1956 season after the Riley family moved and they were given new neighbors portrayed by Sundstrom and George O'Hanlon.

Sundstorm married baritone and musical theatre actor and radio personality Ronald Graham on December 20, 1940, who died in 1950, aged 38. Sundstorm died in Los Angeles on June 25, 2001, at the age of 83.

== Filmography ==
=== Film ===
Year	Title	Role	Notes
1955	The Rose Tattoo	Flora	
1956	The Vagabond King	Laughing Margot	
1957	Spring Reunion	Mary	
1961	Bachelor in Paradise	Mrs. Pickering	
1966	The Defector	Landlady	
1967	The Last Challenge	Outdoors	
1977	The World's Greatest Lover	Aunt Tillie	
1985	Stitches	Maid	
1990	Pacific Heights	Mrs. Thayer	

=== Television ===
Year	Title	Role	Notes
1955-1956	The Life of Riley	Belle Dudley	Main cast
1963	Bonanza	Daisy	Episode: Rich Man, Poor Man
1961	Hazel	Minna	Episode: "Winter Wonderland"
1962	Hazel	Flo	Episode: "How to Lure an Epicure"
1964	Hazel	Mrs. Jeffries	Episode: "The Fashion Show"
1965	The World's Greatest Lover	Matilda;	Episode: "Bonnie Boy"
1965	I Dream of Jeannie	Jeannie's Mother	Episode: "My Hero?"
1965	12 O'Clock High	Nell Forrester	
1967	The Wild Wild West	Mrs. Moore	Episode: "The Night of the Circus of Death"
1971	The F.B.I.	Landlady	Episode: "The Recruiter"
1971	Marcus Welby, M.D.	Marian	Episode:"False Spring"
1974	Cannon	Sgt. Mary	Episode:"Avenger"
1976	The Streets of San Francisco	Manager	Episode:"Runaway"
1977	The Streets of San Francisco	Lydia Beauchamps	Episode:"Dead Life"
1977	Quincy, M.E.	Mrs. Hawley	Episode:"A Dead Man's Truth"
1978	Barnaby Jones	Mrs. Nicholson	Episode:"Hitchhike to Terror "
1995	Barnaby Jones	Beverly's friend	Episode:"Shower the People You Love With Stuff"
1998	JAG	Frances Roland	Episode: "The Return of Jimmy Blackhorse"
