= To Beat the Band =

1935 US film directed by Benjamin Stoloff

- Directed by: Benjamin Stoloff; Kenny Holmes (assistant)
- Screenplay by: Rian James
- Story by: George Marion, Jr.
- Produced by: Zion Myers
- Starring: Hugh Herbert; Helen Broderick; Roger Pryor; Fred Keating
- Cinematography: Nick Musuraca
- Edited by: George Crone
- Music by: Alberto Colombo
- Production company: RKO Pictures
- Distributed by: RKO Pictures
- Release date: November 8, 1935 (US)
- Running time: 70 minutes
- Country: United States
- Language: English

To Beat the Band is a 1935 American romantic comedy directed by Benjamin Stoloff using a screenplay by Rian James based on a story by George Marion, Jr. The film stars Hugh Herbert, Helen Broderick, Roger Pryor, and Fred Keating, and features Johnny Mercer in a small role. Baritone Ronald Graham was a featured singer in the film. It was released by RKO Radio Pictures on November 8, 1935.

== Cast ==
- Helen Broderick as Freedy MacCreery
- Hugh Herbert as Hugo Twist
- Roger Pryor as Larry Barry
- Fred Keating as Fred Carson
- Eric Blore as Hawkings
- Phyllis Brooks as Rowena
- Evelyn Poe as Barbara Shelby
- Johnny Mercer as Member of the Band
- Ray Mayer as McCrory
- Joy Hodges as Girls’ Orchestra Leader
- Sonny Lamont as Dancer
- Ronald Graham as Solo Singer with Girls’ Orchestra
- Torben Meyer as Head Waiter

And the Original California Collegians

== Critical reception ==
Motion Picture Herald wrote that the film "is funny enough", but was unlikely to hold the attention of the audience. They continued, "It features a number of players whose forte is comic stuff. Individually they turn in acceptable contributions. As a whole, the production with its definite hokum harum-scarum tinge hardly jells."

Lionel Collier, writing for the British magazine, Picturegoer, gave the film a two-star review and commented that it included, "An absurd plot, accompanied by tuneful music, clever dancing and a slight romantic element." Of the performances, he wrote, "Hugh Herbert is in his best form" and "could not wish for a better foil than Helen Broderick, who is in fine fettle." He continued with, "The love interest, which runs to conventional lines, is quite capably looked after by Roger Pryor and Phyllis Brooks. Fred Keating shows to advantage, and Eric Blore, as usual, turns in a polished little comedy study. The star support of the dancing is Sonny Lamont, and very good he is, too."
