= Jane Green (singer) =

American singer

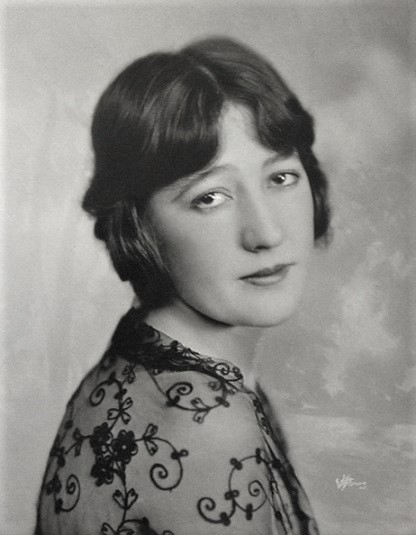
- Born: Martha Jane Greene; January 2, 1897; Kentucky, U.S.
- Died: August 28, 1931 (aged 34); Berkeley, California, U.S.
- Spouses: Jimmy Byler (m. 1918; died 1924) Ron Wilson (m. 1927)

Jane Green (born Martha Jane Greene, January 2, 1897 – August 28, 1931) was an American actress and singer who was popular in the 1920s.

== Biography ==
Jane Green was born in Kentucky on January 2, 1897, as Martha Jane Greene, the only daughter to Charles Frederick Greene Sr. and Lucinda Belle Willis. She had four older brothers, and was part Cherokee.

Her parents divorced in 1905, and Willis and her five children relocated to Los Angeles. In 1911, Jane and her brother Fred became known as "Those Kentucky Kids" and entertained people on Spring Street in Los Angeles.

During her career, she recorded over 30 phonograph records, and appeared in several early sound films.

In 1916, she met songwriter Jimmy Byler. They performed together and were signed by Florenz Ziegfeld for 9 O'Clock Review and Midnight Frolic. Green and Byler were married on September 30, 1918, and remained together until Byler's death in 1924.

During the 1920s, Green began her recording career and also appeared on Broadway. Her Broadway credits include Ziegfeld Nine O'Clock Review (1919), Greenwich Village Follies (1925), and Nifties of 1923 (1923).

Jane traveled to London in 1925 and performed at the Piccadilly Hotel and The Kit Kat Club. In 1927 she married pianist Ron Wilson. The following year she appeared in multiple film shorts in which Wilson accompanied her.

Green sang on the Blue Monday Jamboree on KFRC in San Francisco, California.

In 1930, Green became a Christian Scientist. She died on August 28, 1931; obituaries note the cause being a paralytic stroke. Her body was cremated.
