= The Saint in New York (film) =

1938 film by Ben Holmes

- theatrical release poster
- Directed by: Ben Holmes
- Screenplay by: Charles Kaufman; Mortimer Offner
- Story by: Charles Kaufman; Mortimer Offner; Anthony Veiller
- Based on: The Saint in New York; 1935 novel Leslie Charteris
- Produced by: William Sistrom
- Starring: Louis Hayward; Kay Sutton; Sig Ruman; Jonathan Hale
- Cinematography: Joseph H. August; Frank Redman
- Edited by: Harry Marker
- Music by: Roy Webb
- Production company: RKO Radio Pictures
- Distributed by: RKO Radio Pictures
- Release date: June 3, 1938
- Running time: 71-72 minutes
- Country: United States
- Language: English
- Budget: $128,000
- Box office: $460,000

The Saint in New York is a 1938 American crime film, directed by Ben Holmes and adapted from Leslie Charteris's 1935 novel of the same name by Charles Kaufman and Mortimer Offner. After a police lieutenant is killed, the New York Police Department enlists gentleman criminal Simon Templar to fight criminal elements in the city.

Released by RKO Pictures, The Saint in New York marks the first screen appearance of Templar, also known as "The Saint". Louis Hayward stars as the title character, with Kay Sutton as his love interest. Alfred Hitchcock was initially discussed as a possible director for the film. This was the first of eight films in RKO's film series about The Saint. After being replaced in the series by George Sanders, Hayward would not play The Saint again until 1953 in Hammer Films production of The Saint's Return. There had not been a Saint film made in twelve years.

== Plot ==
Police Lieutenant Martin, an officer leading the fight against New York gangsters, is killed. Jake Irbell is arrested and charged with his murder, but has to be released when prosecution witnesses are either coerced into changing their testimony or simply disappear. A civilian crime commission demands action of the police commissioner, but he has no fresh ideas. William Valcross (Frederick Burton), a respected leading citizen and member of the commission, suggests they resort to drastic measures and recruit Simon Templar (Louis Hayward), the "Saint", a British amateur detective with a reputation for dealing with criminals outside the law. The commissioner reluctantly agrees to give the Saint free rein to do what he must.

Valcross spends months tracking the Saint down, following a trail of dead (criminal) bodies across Europe and South America. Templar is intrigued by the challenge and is given a list of six gangsters whose removal would hopefully bring peace to the city.

Disguised as a nun, the Saint kills Irbell just as he is about to shoot his most determined enemy, Inspector Henry Fernack (Jonathan Hale). (This differs from the original novel in which the Saint shoots an accused cop-killer in cold blood after the man walks free from court). As he works his way through the list, Templar learns that the mysterious "Big Fellow" is the mastermind who hides his identity by communicating with his underlings solely through Fay Edwards (Kay Sutton). Templar meets Fay, and they are attracted to each other. She saves his life twice when his recklessness gets him in trouble. The Saint disposes of the last of the six original targets, Hutch Rellin (Sig Ruman), leaving only their leader.

Fay has given her word not to divulge the Big Fellow's name, but agrees to point him out when she meets him the next morning at the bank where the profits of three years worth of crime have been kept. When Valcross happens by, Templar tells him why he is waiting there. Valcross starts to leave, but when Fay shows up, she recognizes him. He fatally shoots her before Templar guns down the Big Fellow. Valcross wanted Templar to kill his men so he would not have to share the loot.

== Cast ==
- Louis Hayward as Simon Templar
- Kay Sutton as Fay Edwards
- Sig Ruman as Hutch Rellin
- Jonathan Hale as Inspector Henry Fernack
- Jack Carson as Red Jenks, one of Hutch's men
- Paul Guilfoyle as Hymie Fanro, another of Hutch's men
- Frederick Burton as William Valcross
- Ben Welden as Boots "Pappy" Papinoff, one of the six gangsters
- Charles Halton as Vincent Nather, Irbell's lawyer
- Cliff Bragdon as Sebastian Lipke
- Frank M. Thomas as Prosecutor
- George Irving as Judge
- Paul Fix as Phil Farrell - Doorman at the Silverclub
- Edward LeSaint as Committee Member (uncredited)

== Production ==
Hayward is generally praised for his portrayal of the Saint; his performance has been described as "a poor man’s... Orson Welles", considered "rakish" while staying faithful to Charteris' vision. However he was unable to repeat the role because he was signed to a multi-picture deal by Edward Small who wanted to make Hayward a star. After being replaced in the series by George Sanders (Sanders later being replaced by Hugh Sinclair), Hayward would return to the role 15 years later in 1953's The Saint's Return (known as The Saint's Girl Friday in the US).

In the RKO films, Templar's New York Police Department contact, Inspector Fernack, as played by Jonathan Hale, appeared four times, even in films not specifically set in New York; Templar's British law enforcement foil, Inspector Teal of Scotland Yard, would appear in films set in Britain, played by different actors.

In 1937, Alfred Hitchcock met with Lillie Messinger of RKO. Hitchcock showed interest in coming to America and making The Saint in New York. Ultimately, the film was made a year later with Ben Holmes directing.

== Reception ==
The film was extremely popular, making a profit of $195,000.
