= The Saint's Return =

1953 film by Seymour Friedman

- US film poster with the US title
- Directed by: Seymour Friedman
- Written by: Allan MacKinnon (screenplay); Based on characters created by Leslie Charteris
- Produced by: Anthony Hinds; Julian Lesser
- Starring: Louis Hayward; Naomi Chance; Sydney Tafler; Charles Victor
- Cinematography: Walter J. Harvey
- Edited by: James Needs
- Music by: Ivor Slaney
- Production company: Hammer Film Productions
- Distributed by: Exclusive Films (UK; RKO Pictures (US)
- Release date: 12 October 1953 (UK)
- Running time: 73 minutes (UK); 68 minutes (US)
- Country: United Kingdom
- Language: English

The Saint's Return (released in the US as The Saint's Girl Friday) is a 1953 British crime thriller film directed by Seymour Friedman and starring Louis Hayward, Naomi Chance, Sydney Tafler and Charles Victor. It was produced by Hammer Film Productions in London and released later in the United States as The Saint's Girl Friday.

It premiered in London under the original title on 12 October 1953, distributed in the UK by Hammer Films' own distribution company, Exclusive Films. It was released in the US by RKO under the US title in March, 1954. Louis Hayward, who had been the first actor to play Simon Templar in The Saint in New York (1938) returned here to the role one last time. Diana Dors was only added to the cast a week after shooting began, to add a little spice to the picture. Jimmy Sangster was assistant director, Phil Leakey did Makeup, and J. Elder Wills was the art director. Tully Montgomery was originally signed to direct this picture, but Louis Hayward requested to work with Seymour Friedman instead, and got his wish.Filming ran from Feb. 2, 1953 until March 6, 1953, and the film was trade shown at the Rialto on September 1, 1953. It was released in the UK on October 12, 1953.

== Plot ==
A female friend Judy Fenton asks the Saint for help and tells him that her fiance Keith Merton is being blackmailed by gangsters. She soon after ends up dead in a suspicious car accident. The Saint sets about investigating and discovers the involvement of the River Mob, a gangster organisation involved with a floating casino barge. The Saint is helped by a beautiful woman named Carol Denby and his faithful valet Hoppy Uniatz. Later Keith Merton winds up murdered. The Saint discovers the leader of the gangsters is a man named Irish Cassidy, and finds out who was responsible for the murders.

== Cast ==
- Louis Hayward as Simon Templar/The Saint
- Naomi Chance as Carol Denby
- Sydney Tafler as Max Lennar
- Charles Victor as Chief Insp. Claud Teal
- Jane Carr as Katie Finch
- Harold Lang as Jarvis
- William Russell as Keith Merton
- Diana Dors as The Blonde in Lennar's Apartment
- Fred Johnson as Irish Cassidy
- Thomas Gallagher as Hoppy, his valet
- Russell Napier as Col. Stafford
- Sam Kydd as Barclay
- Ian Fleming as Lord Merton

== Production ==
Although based upon Charteris' character, the film was an original work by British screenwriter Allan MacKinnon and not based directly on any of Charteris' stories. Charteris, however, had a percentage interest in the film. It is the first filmed Saint production to feature the character of Hoppy Uniatz, Templar's assistant in the 1940s-era Saint books. Percy Herbert later played the character in at least one episode of the 1960s TV series.

Hayward's casting was announced in January 1953. He was originally going to England to make No Escape but that film was actually made in Hollywood. It was Hayward's first film in England since The Lady and the Bandit.

In March 1953 as filming was being completed the title was changed from The Saint's Queen to The Saint's Return.

It was the second film Dors made for Hammer after The Last Page. In September 1953 producer Julian Lesser had signed Dors to make two more movies.

== Reception ==
=== Critical reception ===
The Los Angeles Times said it had "unusually good suspense elements with Hayward competently leading the way".

Derek Winnert called it "a very watchable British stab at reviving the series", adding that "with its neat plot and decent sly sense of humour, it is entirely entertaining, if only mildly". Of the actors, he wrote: "An ideal Hayward is aloofly smooth and suitably chilly in a role he created in the original film", concluding that "there’s a really good true Brit cast to support him".

=== Box office ===
This was the first Saint film to be released in ten years, following RKO's The Saint series 1938-1943, and Hammer Films had hopes to revive the series, but this did not occur. In 1960, a French-Italian film entitled Le Saint mène la danse, with Felix Marten playing The Saint, was released with very limited success. It was not until 1962 and the TV series The Saint, starring Roger Moore, that the character achieved lasting success beyond the literary world. The next English-language cinema film featuring the character wouldn't be released until 1997, with Val Kilmer playing the character in The Saint.
