= The Saint Takes Over =

- Directed by: Jack Hively
- Written by: Lynn Root; Frank Fenton
- Based on: characters created by Leslie Charteris
- Produced by: Howard Benedict
- Starring: George Sanders; Wendy Barrie; Jonathan Hale
- Cinematography: Frank Redman
- Edited by: Desmond Marquette
- Music by: Roy Webb
- Production company: RKO Radio Pictures
- Release dates: June 7, 1940; May 27, 1940 (New York City)
- Running time: 69 minutes
- Country: United States
- Language: English

The Saint Takes Over, released in 1940 by RKO Pictures, is the fifth of eight films in RKO's film series about Simon Templar, also known as "The Saint", the Robin Hood-inspired crimefighter created by Leslie Charteris. George Sanders plays Templar for the fourth time; he made his final Saint picture the following year. Wendy Barrie plays his latest romantic interest in the second of her three repertory appearances in the Saint film series.

In 1941, RKO replaced its Saint series with The Falcon, also starring George Sanders.

== Plot ==
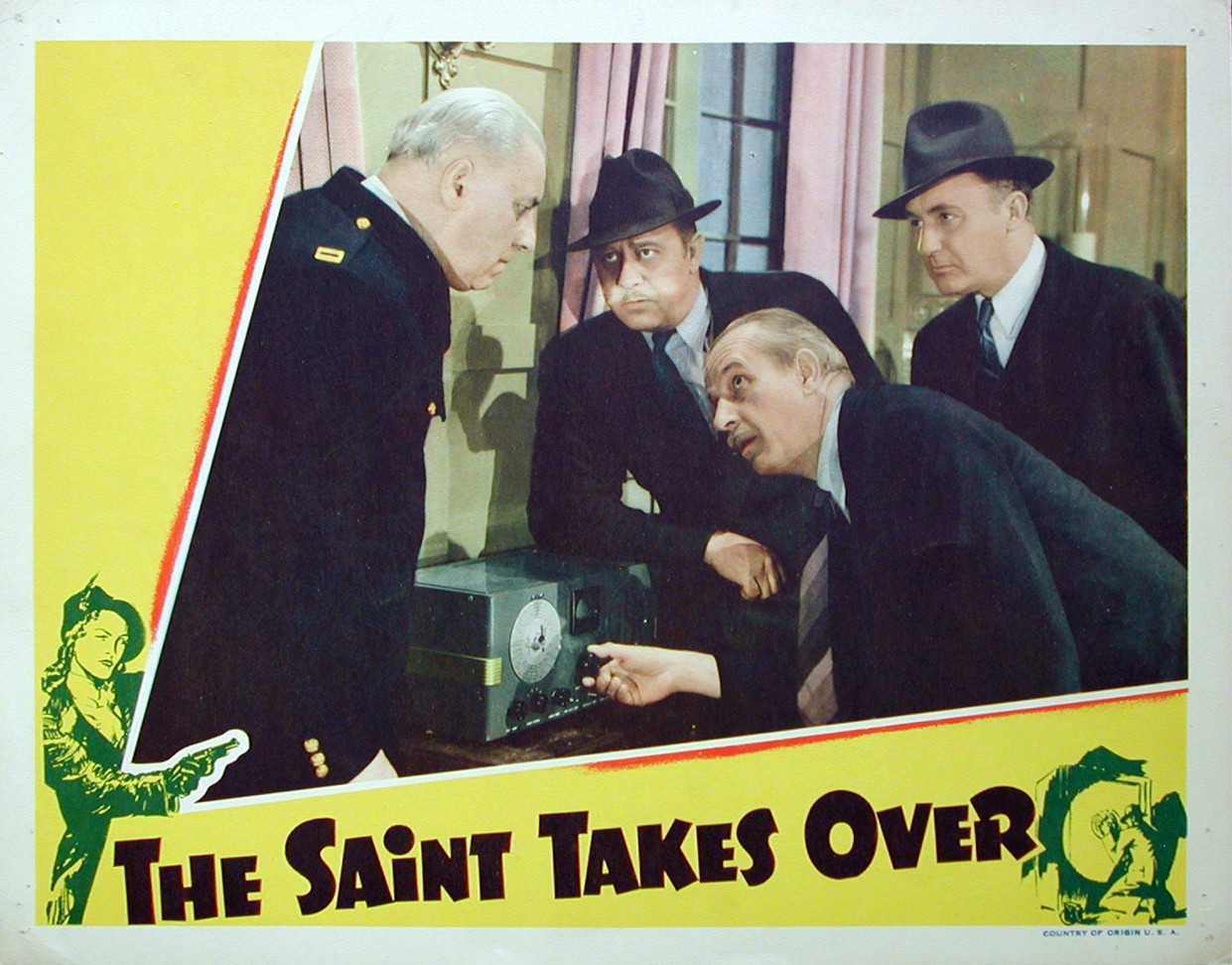
Lobby card

On an ocean liner making its way to New York, Simon Templar, "the Saint", rescues a fellow passenger from card cheats, though she refuses to give him her name and is offended when he kisses her without invitation. He later sends the mysterious woman a rose corsage by way of apology.

The Saint learns that his friendly nemesis, Inspector Henry Farnack, has been suspended from the police force after $50,000 was found in his safe. He has been framed by "Big" Ben Egan on behalf of his race-fixing gang, which Fernack was investigating. The other members of the gang - "Rocky" Weldon, Leo Sloan, Sam Reese and Max Bremer - each pay a quarter share of the $90,000 cost of the frameup. Rocky himself has just been cleared in a trial after the testimony of his bodyguard, Clarence "Pearly" Gates and the murder of the main prosecution witness, Johnny Summers.

Egan orders two henchmen to pick up the woman passenger when the ship arrives. Templar is able to foil them, and the woman drives off in a taxi. Templar goes to see Fernack. Weldon sends Gates to rob Egan, but Egan catches the safe cracker. At gunpoint, Gates confesses that Welden sent him. Egan orders him to lure his boss into a trap, but after Gates leaves, an unseen shooter kills Egan. Templar and Fernack meet when they both sneak into Egan's place. The Saint finds the hidden camera and later develops the photograph. He also picks up a clue, a rose petal.

Welden assumes Gates killed Egan and has the $90,000, despite Gates' protestations. Templar blackmails Gates into helping him in exchange for not giving the police the photograph and telling Weldon that Gates does not have the money. However, when they go to see Weldon, they find him dead, and once again, Fernack is already there.

Templar, assisted by Gates, kidnaps Sloan, the most likely of the survivors to talk, but they are followed. When Templar leaves Sloan guarded by Fernack, Sloan is shot and killed through Fernack's basement window. They take the body back to Sloan's place, but the suspicious police burst in and take them by surprise. Only Templar manages to escape.

He waits for the murderer in Reese's apartment (Bremer being out of town). He is unsurprised when the woman shows up. It is his fellow ship passenger Ruth Summers, Johnny's sister, out for revenge. He offers to help her. Templar has Gates "betray" him to Bremer and Reese. They catch him searching Bremer's office. He offers to trade the $90,000 for his life, but insists they tell him everything. Their unwitting confessions are broadcast to the police via a hidden microphone and radio transmitter. When the police arrive, Bremer escapes by the fire escape. In the alley, he encounters Ruth. Each fatally shoots the other. Ruth makes a deathbed confession to the three previous murders, then dies before Templar can tell her something important.

== Cast ==
- George Sanders as Simon Templar / The Saint
- Wendy Barrie as Ruth Summers
- Jonathan Hale as Inspector Henry Fernack
- Paul Guilfoyle as Clarence "Pearly" Gates
- Morgan Conway as Sam Reese
- Robert Emmett Keane as Leo Sloan
- Cy Kendall as Max Bremer (as Cyrus W. Kendall)
- James Burke as Patrolman Mike
- Robert Middlemass as Captain Wade
- Roland Drew as Albert "Rocky" Weldon
- Nella Walker as Mrs. Lucy Fernack, Henry's wife
- Pierre Watkin as "Big" Ben Egan
