= The Saint Goes On =

1934 book by Leslie Charteris

- First edition (UK)
- Author: Leslie Charteris
- Language: English
- Series: The Saint
- Genre: Mystery fiction
- Publisher: Hodder and Stoughton
- Publication date: 1934
- Publication place: United Kingdom
- Media type: Print (hardback & paperback)
- Preceded by: Boodle
- Followed by: The Saint in New York

The Saint Goes On is a collection of three mystery novellas by Leslie Charteris, first published in the United Kingdom in November 1934 by Hodder and Stoughton and in the United States in May 1935 by The Crime Club. This book continues the adventures of Charteris' creation, Simon Templar, alias The Saint.

== Stories ==
The book consists of the following stories:

1. The High Fence - The Saint and his partners Patricia Holm and Hoppy Uniatz pursue a mysterious and deadly purveyor of stolen goods known as The High Fence who has a habit of killing people who are about to reveal his identity to Chief Inspector Claud Eustace Teal and Scotland Yard. Things heat up when Simon steals a small fortune in jewels from the High Fence, leading to a kidnapping, a near drowning, and a surprise revelation. Hoppy appears for the first time since The Misfortunes of Mr. Teal.
2. The Elusive Ellshaw - When a woman asks Simon to investigate the sudden reappearance of her husband who has been missing for a year, the Saint and Mr. Teal find themselves embroiled in a case of blackmail and murder. Ultimately the unlikely team find themselves protecting an English lord who happens to be one of the Saint's biggest fans. This story contains references to numerous previous Saint novels and short stories, including Knight Templar and She Was a Lady.
3. The Case of the Frightened Innkeeper - The Saint and Hoppy Uniatz are summoned to a small inn on the English coast to investigate strange nighttime activity in and around the hotel which has left the owner of the inn and his niece a bundle of nerves.

Except for a couple of brief references in succeeding books, this collection of stories marks the last major appearances of Teal and Holm until The Ace of Knaves, published three years later.

== Publication history ==
Two of the three novellas were previously published in Thriller magazine under different titles:

- "The High Fence" - 16 June 1934 (as "The Man Who Knew")
- "The Elusive Ellshaw - 28 July 1934 (as "The Race Train Crime")

== Television adaptations ==
All three stories were adapted as episodes of The Saint TV series. During the second season, "The Elusive Ellshaw" aired on 17 October 1963, followed by "The High Fence" on 20 February 1964. During the third season, "Case of the Frightened Innkeeper" was adapted as "The Frightened Innkeeper" and broadcast on 18 February 1965.
