= Old Man Rhythm =

1935 film directed by Edward Ludwig

- Directed by: Edward Ludwig
- Screenplay by: Sig Herzig; Ernest Pagano
- Story by: Lewis Gensler; Sig Herzig; Don Hartman
- Produced by: Zion Myers
- Starring: Charles "Buddy" Rogers; George Barbier; Barbara Kent; Grace Bradley
- Cinematography: Nick Musuraca
- Edited by: George Crone
- Music by: Roy Webb
- Production company: RKO Radio Pictures
- Release date: August 2, 1935 (US)
- Running time: 75 minutes
- Country: United States
- Language: English

Old Man Rhythm is a 1935 American musical film directed by Edward Ludwig from a screenplay by Sig Herzig and Ernest Pagano, based on a story by Herzig, Lewis Gensler, and Don Hartman. The musical director was Roy Webb, with music composed by Lewis Gensler and lyrics by Johnny Mercer. The film stars Charles "Buddy" Rogers, George Barbier, Barbara Kent, and Grace Bradley.

== Cast ==
- Charles "Buddy" Rogers - Johnny Roberts
- George Barbier - John Roberts Sr.
- Barbara Kent - Edith Warren
- Grace Bradley - Marion Beecher
- Betty Grable - Sylvia
- Eric Blore - 'Phil' Phillips
- Bess Flowers - Miss Martin
- Erik Rhodes - Frank Rochet
- Ronald Graham - Ronald
