= The Saint in New York =

1935 novel by Leslie Charteris

- First American edition
- Author: Leslie Charteris
- Language: English
- Series: The Saint
- Genre: Mystery novel
- Publisher: Hodder and Stoughton
- Publication date: 1935
- Publication place: United Kingdom
- Media type: Print (hardback & paperback)
- Preceded by: The Saint Goes On
- Followed by: Saint Overboard

The Saint in New York is a mystery novel by Leslie Charteris, first published in the United Kingdom by Hodder and Stoughton in 1935. It was published in the United States by Doubleday in January 1935. A shorter version of the novel had previously been published in the September 1934 issue of The American Magazine.

The Saint in New York was the 15th book chronicling the adventures of Simon Templar (alias The Saint), an anti-hero character patterned after Robin Hood. The book is considered the most popular Saint volume. Saint expert Burl Barer in his history Saint: A Complete History in Print, Radio, Film and Television 1928–1992, indicates that The Saint in New York was the first "bestseller" of the Simon Templar series, and was the book that established Charteris as a literary celebrity in America and Britain. Due to the book's popularity, it became the first Simon Templar story to be adapted for film.

Up until this point, Charteris had published at least two (sometimes more) Saint books in any given calendar year. The Saint in New York broke the pattern by being the only series entry published in 1935.

== Plot ==
During a visit to Europe, Simon Templar (alias "The Saint") befriends a rich American whose son was recently murdered in New York City; the culprit went free due to police and courtroom corruption. Templar is given an offer he can't refuse: $1 million if he goes to New York and deals out his unique brand of justice to evildoers in that city.

The book begins with the New York Police Department receiving a letter of warning from Scotland Yard Chief Inspector Claud Eustace Teal, indicating that Templar, after being inactive for six months (presumably since the events of The Saint Goes On), has relocated to the United States. The letter is accompanied by a dossier on Templar's career thus far (Charteris proceeds to give new readers a brief summary of past adventures dating back to the first Saint novel, 1928's Meet the Tiger).

When an accused cop-killer is found shot to death, the NYPD knows the Saint has arrived in New York. After Templar rescues a child who has been kidnapped by a mob boss (assassinating the gangster in the process), the whole city learns that the Saint is on the job. Templar's ultimate goal is to discover the identity of the city's main kingpin who is known only as "The Big Fellow".

Templar is abducted by one of the remaining crime lords and two corrupt, high-ranking New York City officials offer him $200,000 to reveal who is backing him. Templar claims to be working on his own, and the crime lord orders Templar to be taken for the proverbial "ride". Templar is taken to a remote location in New Jersey but manages to escape his fate thanks to the intervention of Fay Edwards, a beautiful young woman who happens to be a cold-blooded killer, and who claims to be working for The Big Fellow. Simon Templar and Fay Edwards fall in love with each other, in a completely Platonic way (they exchange only two kisses and exchange only a few words) which seems nevertheless very deep and poignantly emotional. (On his return to London, in the last page of the book, Templar would refuse to tell Patricia Holm about his American experiences.)

The Saint eventually learns that he is being manipulated into killing off certain crime bosses in order that The Big Fellow will not have to split a $17 million cache of blood money that was going to be shared among the gangsters. In effect, rather than being a daring and idealistic vigilante, as he thought of himself, Templar finds that he had been made into a gangland hit man – and very much dislikes to see himself in such a role.

And when Big Fellow's identity is finally revealed, he ends up being the last person Templar would suspect.

== Film adaptation ==
It was this book that RKO Radio Pictures purchased and made the basis for their first Saint film, which was released in 1938. William Sistrom was the producer. Louis Hayward was cast as Simon Templar. A minor change was made to the character of Inspector Fernack; the spelling of his name was changed to Farnack and remained so for all future film appearances.

In 1987, a television pilot for a potential new Saint TV series was broadcast on CBS. Entitled The Saint in Manhattan, the pilot was not directly based upon the novel but did feature the character of Inspector Farnack.

== Cultural references ==
A copy of the novel The Saint in New York was featured prominently in an episode of the Canadian sitcom Corner Gas in 2004. In the episode "Comedy Night", the show's lead character, Brent Leroy, attempts to sway a local ladies' reading club away from examining Oprah's Book Club-style titles like The Life of Pi and into adventure fiction such as Don Pendleton's The Executioner and The Saint in New York. Brent compares The Saint in New York's plot with the "fish out of water" plot of The Life of Pi. According to the book Tales from Dog River: The Complete Corner Gas Guide by Michele Sponagle, the show's prop department had to obtain multiple copies of the novel for filming, but found it difficult to do so since it is out of print; they had to order copies from as far away as Florida. (Ultimately, however, only one copy of the book actually appeared on screen, specifically the 1980s reprint edition by Charter Books.)

In the film Inglourious Basterds, the character Shosanna Dreyfus can be seen reading The Saint in New York while sitting in a Paris café. The same book is present in a scene where Shosanna and her lover Marcel are planning to kill all the top Nazis in Chapter Five ("Revenge of the Giant Face").
