= The Last Hero (Charteris novel) =

1930 novel by Leslie Charteris

The Last Hero also The Saint Closes the Case
- First edition
- Author: Leslie Charteris
- Language: English
- Series: The Saint
- Genre: Mystery novel, Science fiction novel
- Publisher: Hodder & Stoughton
- Publication date: 1930
- Publication place: United Kingdom
- Media type: Print (hardback & paperback)
- Pages: 318 pp
- Preceded by: Enter the Saint
- Followed by: Knight Templar

The Last Hero is the title of a thriller novel by Leslie Charteris that was first published in the United Kingdom in May 1930 by Hodder and Stoughton and in the United States in November 1930 by The Crime Club. The story initially appeared in The Thriller, a British magazine, in 1929. Because of this somewhat convoluted publishing history, The Last Hero is occasionally cited as the second volume of adventures featuring the crime-busting antihero Simon Templar, alias The Saint, predating Enter the Saint. In fact, according to Charteris himself, it was the third book of the series. This is supported by references to the events of Enter the Saint within the novel.

== Alternative titles ==
The book is also known by its later republication title The Saint Closes the Case, which was first used in 1950. The modified title The Saint and the Last Hero is also often used (somewhat bizarrely, since the last hero – so-called by Vargan – is the Saint himself). Other alternative titles include The Creeping Death and Sudden Death.

== Plot summary ==
Unlike previous Saint stories, which were straightforward realistic crime dramas, The Last Hero saw Simon Templar entering the realm of both science fiction and spy fiction. The novel starts an unspecified length of time after the events of Enter the Saint with an account of Simon Templar, The Saint, foiling an assassination attempt on a visiting prince by tricking the would-be assassin into blowing himself up. This leads to The Saint becoming a cause célèbre among the British people, to the point where the government offers him not only a full pardon for past crimes, but also a job as a sanctioned crime-buster. Templar politely refuses, saying he prefers to remain underground, his identity a secret to all but a select few. (He would revisit this decision, however, in the later story "The Impossible Crime" (featured in the collection Alias the Saint) and again in the novel, She Was a Lady.)

Over the next three months, the Saint operates so far in the shadows that the general public thinks he has retired or disappeared. During this time, Templar hears from a reporter friend about troubling indications that conditions for a new war in Europe might be brewing (Templar insists that after the events of the First World War there wouldn't be another such war "for hundreds of years"). Later, during an outing in the countryside with fellow adventurer and girlfriend Patricia Holm, Templar stumbles upon a secret British government installation where he and Holm witness the testing of a deadly and mysterious weapon—the electroncloud machine, which creates a vapour capable of turning anything (and anyone) it touches into ash.

Templar and Holm are about to leave when they encounter a giant of a man named Rayt Marius, an evil tycoon who wants the weapon for his own purposes. After escaping to safety, Templar determines that he and his team must steal or destroy the weapon before their government—or any other—can use it against people. Not only that, but the weapon must not be allowed to fall into Marius' hands. In order that such a weapon never be re-created, Templar also plans to kidnap the device's inventor and, if necessary, kill the scientist.

Things become complicated when Marius kidnaps Patricia Holm, setting Templar off into an uncharacteristically murderous rage. Meanwhile, Scotland Yard Inspector Claud Eustace Teal also finds himself getting involved, even though the identity of The Saint remains a mystery to him.

After rescuing Patricia from the clutches of Marius, Templar realises that his quest for anonymity is at an end (with both Marius and Teal now aware of who he really is) and be gins to make plans to leave the country (along with his compatriots if they so choose). But first he must try to convince the inventor of the electroncloud to abandon the weapon; when the scientist indicates that he not only refuses to give up his work, but might also be mad, Templar reluctantly decides the man must die to potentially save the lives of millions.

Before he can execute the scientist, Templar's base is attacked by Marius, who is revealed to be working for the same prince Templar earlier saved. During the melee, one of Templar's men, Norman Kent, completes the Saint's orders and kills the scientist; he does so after determining that whoever killed the scientist would be likely to hang for murder if caught, and out of loyalty to Templar chose to take the chance himself. It is also revealed that Kent, who had only been mentioned briefly in previous Saint adventures, harboured an unrequited love for Patricia Holm, possibly originating from a Mediterranean cruise on which Templar had assigned Kent to take Holm to keep her out of trouble (as indicated in Enter the Saint).

Later, while being held at gunpoint by Marius and the prince, Kent reveals that he killed the scientist, but not before being given the man's final notes on the electroncloud. In exchange for Marius and the Prince allowing the Saint and his friends Patricia and Roger Conway to go free, Kent agrees to hand over the documents.

After Templar and his group (save Kent) depart, Kent reveals that he has played a trick on Marius and had secretly passed the notes off to Simon before his departure. As the book ends, Marius shoots Norman Kent dead as he stands in front of a window to stop Marius shooting through it.

The Last Hero was published 15 years before the advent of nuclear weapons, and nine years before the outbreak of the Second World War, yet contains statements that could be seen as predicting these two milestones. Perhaps coincidentally, the name Albert Einstein is mentioned in passing. The electroncloud device is only shown in action once and, while the inventor of the device is killed, and Marius states to Templar that the machine Templar and Holm witnessed in action was destroyed by his men, it is never revealed what, if anything, Templar did with the scientist's notes. It is noteworthy that "The Last Hero" was published on the same year as Olaf Stapledon's vast science fiction opus Last and First Man – an otherwise utterly different kind of book, yet Stapledon also included the plot element of a scientist inventing a terrible weapon of mass destruction, which must be suppressed, even at the cost of its inventor's life.

The Last Hero was the first of a trilogy of novels. The events of this novel (in particular the fate of Norman Kent) led to an immediate sequel, Knight Templar (a.k.a. The Avenging Saint), which was published later in 1930 and which takes place three months after the conclusion of Last Hero. In 1932, after an interval of a number of unrelated novellas and a full-length novel, the trilogy concluded with Getaway.

After this book, the character of Holm fades somewhat into the background for a time, although she would return to the forefront in the novella collection The Holy Terror.

The tone of the book is far more romantic and tragic than the average Simon Templar books. In most books of the series, the reader can know in advance that no matter what terrible threats and perils Templar would face, he would survive them all and live to have new adventures in the next book and the next.

Conversely, in the present book Charteris drops many hints that Norman Kent is in effect "fey", meaning doomed to die—for example, his hopeless but gallant love for Patricia Holm.

Norman Kent, rather than Templar, is the true protagonist—certainly in the book's later parts. With reference to this book, Caroline Whitehead and George McLeod wrote:

(...) Norman Kent is an archetypal knight-errant. Though formally a man of 20th Century England, he lives (and dies) by the Code of Chivalry. He loves totally his Lady, Patricia Holm—who, like Don Quixote's Dulcinea, is not aware of that love. He is totally loyal to his Liege Lord, Simon Templar. Like Sir Gawain in "Sir Gawain and the Green Knight", Norman Kent takes on threats made to his Lord, wholly and without reservation. Not only physical threats to life and limb, but also the sometimes unavoidable necessity to perform dishonorable acts which would have reflected badly on the reputation of King Arthur/Simon Templar are taken unflinchingly by Sir Gawain/Norman Kent.

The third sentence of this, however, is contradicted by Patricia herself:

"Dear Pat," said Norman Kent, "I've always longed for a chance to serve you. And now it's come. You knew I loved you, didn't you?"

She touched his hand.

"Don't, Norman dear … please! … Of course I knew. I couldn't help knowing. I'm so sorry…"

.

== Updated edition ==
In a foreword to the 1964 Hodder Paperback edition of Featuring the Saint, Charteris admits to "in a few cases" succumbing to the temptation of updating his earliest Saint stories. One such example occurs in the 1963 Hodder Paperback edition of The Saint Closes the Case where references to Mussolini and the League of Nations are changed to Khrushchev (misspelled "Kruschev") and the United Nations.

== Adaptations ==
Although the novel itself has yet to be adapted on film, the 2013 television pilot The Saint, released in 2017, featured Rayt Marius as its villain.

It was also adopted for radio by the BBC in 1995.
