= The Brighter Buccaneer =

- First edition
- Author: Leslie Charteris
- Language: English
- Series: The Saint
- Genre: Mystery, Short Stories
- Publisher: Hodder and Stoughton
- Publication date: 1933
- Publication place: United Kingdom
- Media type: Print (hardback & paperback)
- Preceded by: Once More the Saint
- Followed by: The Misfortunes of Mr. Teal

The Brighter Buccaneer is a collection of short stories by Leslie Charteris, first published in the United Kingdom by Hodder and Stoughton in June 1933. This was the eleventh book to feature the adventures of Simon Templar, alias "The Saint". It was the first volume to make use of the short story format; previously Charteris had written either short novels (a.k.a. novellas) or full-length novels featuring the character. This format would dominate the series during the late 1940s and through the 1950s.

Charteris originally wrote these stories for Empire News, a British publication that contracted the author to provide a weekly series of stories featuring The Saint. These stories were published in Empire (many were retitled for the book) between August and November 1932, and therefore predate several of the stories in the preceding book, Once More the Saint, though little attempt is made at maintaining continuity with the major novellas and novels.

Charteris would publish a second collection of Empire News shorts as Boodle (also published as The Saint Intervenes).

The story "The Unblemished Bootlegger" introduces a new member of Templar's "family" – Peter Quentin.

== Stories ==
The book consisted of 15 stories, the most of any Saint collection. Some editions list the separate stories as chapters. The stories are each approximately 10 pages in length. (Some editions appear to present these stories in different order). Although most of the stories are stand-alones, a few are connected to each other through plot or characters.

1. The Brain Workers: Templar engages in a minor bit of stock swindling.
2. The Export Trade: Templar is hired to transport a valuable necklace to Paris, but the Saint has other ideas. This story takes place prior to the events of the story "The Man from St. Louis" (from the preceding book, Once More the Saint). This is also the first Saint story since She Was a Lady in which recurring character Patricia Holm does not appear.
3. The Unblemished Bootlegger: Melford Croon is a con artist who specialises in swindling people in the name of non-existent benevolent causes. Templar decides it is time for Croon to make a donation to his own benevolent cause.
4. The Owner's Handicap: Simon and Patricia go to the horse races to turn the tables on a notorious loan shark.
5. The Tough Egg: Max Kemmler runs the busiest illegal gambling den in London, and after making his mint has decided to get out of town. But The Saint has a surprise going-away present.
6. The Bad Baron: Templar discovers that he has competition—a jewel thief known as "The Fox"—and it becomes a matter of pride for him to steal a priceless bracelet from an uncouth baron before the Fox does.
7. The Brass Buddha: Simon encounters an unpleasant landlord who has a brass Buddha that he has to sell for £2,000 as a condition of receiving an inheritance. The Saint decides to take him up on that offer and finds himself at the centre of a near-perfect con game.
8. The Perfect Crime: The Saint targets a crooked moneylender, but in order for his scheme to work, he has to go to jail first.
9. The Appalling Politician: Inspector Claud Eustace Teal recruits the Saint to help him solve a mystery involving stolen trade treaty documents. (Teal is referred to as Chief Inspector Teal in this story, suggesting a possible promotion since his previous appearance in "The Perfect Crime".)
10. The Unpopular Landlord: While looking for a new flat, Templar learns that a crooked landlord is making life miserable for little old ladies across London, and sets in motion a plan to ruin the man. This story features the first appearance of Roger Conway since Knight Templar and Monty Hayward since Getaway.
11. The New Swindle: In this sequel to "The Brain Workers", Templar foils a jewellery insurance scam run by a man he conned in that earlier story.
12. The Five Thousand Pound Kiss: The Saint sets his sights on stealing The Star of Mandalay, a huge diamond, during a private party, but he doesn't bank on encountering the female jewel thief from "The Export Trade".
13. The Green Goods Man: Templar goes undercover as an accountant to draw out a swindler from America who specialises in making his victims believe they are purchasing small fortunes in counterfeit currency.
14. The Blind Spot: After saving a down-on-his-luck inventor from killing himself, Templar takes on a crooked patent agent.
15. The Unusual Ending: This followup to both "The Five Thousand Pound Kiss" and "The Brain Workers" sees Templar attempting to stop an investment swindler from leaving the country with his victim's money, only to find things complicated by the unexpected arrival of Chief Inspector Teal. Meanwhile, Templar tries to convince Peter Quentin that it's time for him to retire. This story is said to take place a year after the novel Getaway.

== Publication history and alternate titles ==
All of the stories had previously appeared in the newspaper Empire News and, other than works written specifically for books, were Charteris' first Saint stories not initially published in Thriller magazine, though several would later appear in Thriller. Except for "The Blind Spot", the omnibus presents the stories in the order in which they were published in Empire. Most of the stories appeared in Empire under different titles, which are noted where applicable:

- "The Brain Workers" - 21 August 1932 (as "To the Call of Beauty in Distress")
- "The Export Trade" - 28 August 1932 (as "Diamond Cut Diamond")
- "The Unblemished Bootlegger" - 4 September 1932 (as "Shanghaied!")
- "The Owners' Handicap" - 11 September 1932 (as "Won by a Neck")
- "The Tough Egg" - 18 September 1932 (as "Double-Cross")
- "The Bad Baron" - 25 September 1932
- "The Brass Buddha" - 2 October 1932
- "The Perfect Crime" - 9 October 1932 (as "The Perfect Touch")
- "The Appalling Politician" - 16 October 1932 (as "Third Degree Fires")
- "The Unpopular Landlord" - 23 October 1932 (as "The Bullying Major")
- "The New Swindle" - 30 October 1932 (as "The Mail Swindle")
- "The Five Thousand Pound Kiss" - 6 November 1932 (as "The Star of Mandalay")
- "The Green Goods Man" - 21 November 1932 (as "The Very Green Goods Man")
- "The Blind Spot" - 13 November 1932 (as "The Stolen Formulas")
- "The Unusual Ending" - 27 November 1932 (as "The Case of the Lady Informer")

== Television adaptation ==
Two of the stories in this collection were adapted as episodes of The Saint.

"The Appalling Politician" was retitled "The Imprudent Politician" and was first broadcast during the show's third season on 10 December 1964. "The Export Trade" was retitled "A Double in Diamonds" and was first broadcast during the show's fifth season on 5 May 1967.
