= The Misfortunes of Mr. Teal =

Book by Leslie Charteris

The Misfortunes of Mr. Teal also The Saint in England also The Saint in London
- 1938 UK edition
- Author: Leslie Charteris
- Language: English
- Series: The Saint
- Genre: Mystery fiction
- Publisher: Hodder and Stoughton (UK); The Crime Club (US)
- Publication date: 1934
- Publication place: United Kingdom
- Media type: Print (hardback & paperback)
- Preceded by: The Brighter Buccaneer
- Followed by: Boodle

The Misfortunes of Mr. Teal is a collection of three mystery novellas by Leslie Charteris, first published in the United Kingdom in May 1934 by Hodder and Stoughton and the United States by The Crime Club. The book was republished under two additional titles: The Saint in England and, as of 1952, The Saint in London (not to be confused with The Saint in London, a 1939 RKO film based upon a story in an earlier Saint volume, The Holy Terror).

This was the 12th volume of stories featuring the Robin Hood-inspired character, Simon Templar, alias The Saint. The original title of the book, however, refers to the character of Claud Eustace Teal, an inspector with Scotland Yard and a recurring adversary of Templar's.

== Stories ==
The book consisted of the following stories:

1. The Simon Templar Foundation: The Saint finds himself in possession of a black book (a legacy from his one-time enemy, Rayt Marius—see Knight Templar). The book contains secrets related to war profiteering by several prominent Englishmen; Templar plans to create a one-million-pound foundation to aid the victims of war by blackmailing the men featured in Marius' book. This story introduces Hoppy Uniatz, a small-time American hoodlum who becomes a long-serving ally of The Saint over the coming decades. This story takes place an unspecified time after the previous Saint books Once More the Saint and The Brighter Buccaneer; Templar is said to be 32 years old (thereby placing this story some three years after Knight Templar) and he has apparently been away from Britain for quite some time, during which he had a series of unchronicled adventures until his travels were cut short by his receipt of the black book.
2. The Higher Finance: Templar impersonates a forger in order to stop the richest man in Europe from generating a cache of fake bond certificates, but soon finds himself in the midst of a bizarre case of impersonation and accidental death. This story reintroduces Orace, Templar's former butler, after an absence of several years.
3. The Art of Alibi: The Saint has to clear his name after his signature calling card (a drawing of a stick figure with a halo) is left at the scene of a murder and the theft of an aeroplane. At the heart of the case is a madman who really believes he is The Saint, and plans to liberate 10 tons worth of gold bullion from a government aircraft. Templar's plans to clear his name are complicated when Hoppy punches out a policeman and Teal finds himself with a case that might finally put Templar behind bars. It is stated that five years have passed since Templar's first dealings with Inspector Teal, which coincides with the first stories featuring Teal that appeared in 1929.

Some later editions include a Foreword by Charteris apologising for the "dated" nature of the stories.

== Publication history ==
The three novellas had previously been published in Thriller magazine under different titles:

- "The Simon Templar Foundation" - 10 February 1934 (as "The Book of Fate")
- "The Higher Finance" - 24 February 1934 (as "On the Night of the 13th!")
- "The Art of Alibi" - 24 March 1934 (as "After the Murder")
