= The Saint's Vacation =

- Directed by: Leslie Fenton
- Screenplay by: Leslie Charteris; Jeffrey Dell
- Story by: Leslie Charteris
- Based on: Getaway by Leslie Charteris
- Produced by: William Sistrom
- Starring: Hugh Sinclair; Sally Gray
- Cinematography: Bernard Knowles
- Edited by: Al Barnes; Ralph Kemplen
- Music by: Bretton Byrd
- Production company: RKO Radio British Productions
- Distributed by: RKO Radio Pictures
- Release dates: 9 May 1941 (US); 24 May 1941 (UK)
- Running time: 61 minutes
- Countries: United Kingdom; United States
- Language: English

The Saint's Vacation is a 1941 adventure film produced by the British arm of RKO Pictures. The film stars Hugh Sinclair as Simon Templar, also known as "The Saint", a world-roving crimefighter who walks the fine edge of the law. This was the seventh of eight films in RKO's film series about the character created by Leslie Charteris. It was Sinclair's first appearance as Templar, having taken over the role from George Sanders, who then stepped into RKO's "Falcon" series.

The film was based upon Charteris' 1932 novel, Getaway (also known as The Saint's Getaway) and, like all the other films in the RKO Saint series, considerable liberties were taken with the original story. Most notably, the time frame of the story has been moved up to the Second World War, with the villains of the piece being Nazis. The film also disregards the fact that Getaway was in fact the third chapter of a trilogy which included the earlier works The Last Hero and Knight Templar. Unlike other films in the Saint series, Charteris himself co-wrote the screenplay. Also, unlike the previous Saint films, which were produced in Hollywood, The Saint's Vacation was produced and filmed in the United Kingdom.

== Plot ==
Most of the story takes place in Switzerland, where Templar interrupts his holiday to retrieve a missing secret code. The key to the mystery is a Swiss music box with a most unusual tune, diligently sought after by enemy agent Rudolph and British secret service operative Valerie. Templar is aided in his investigation by reporter Mary Langdon and Monty Hayward, with Inspector Teal of Scotland Yard.

== Cast ==
- Hugh Sinclair as Simon Templar, aka The Saint
- Sally Gray as Mary Langdon
- Arthur Macrae as Monty Hayward
- Cecil Parker as Rudolph Hauser
- Leueen MacGrath as Valerie (as Leueen Macgrath)
- John Warwick as Gregory
- Manning Whiley as Marko
- Felix Aylmer as Charles Leighton
- Ivor Barnard as Emil
- Gordon McLeod as Inspector Teal
- Eric Clavering as Reporter (uncredited)
- Roddy Hughes as Valet (uncredited)

== Notes ==
In June 1939 John Farrow was announced to direct the film before being replaced by Leslie Fenton.

Several characters from Getaway do appear in the film adaptation, most notably Templar's friend Monty Hayward (the only time this recurring character from the early novels appeared on film). The villain of the film, Rudolf Hauser (played by Cecil Parker) is an adjustment of the book's villain, Prince Rudolf, who had also been the villain in the early Saint novels The Last Hero and Knight Templar. One notable omission from the character list is Templar's literary girlfriend, Patricia Holm, who is replaced by another character, Mary Langdon, played by Sally Gray.

This was the first of two appearances by Sinclair as The Saint; he would later return in the film adaptation of Meet – The Tiger!, also known as The Saint Meets the Tiger.
