= Sydney Kyte =

English bandleader and violinist (1896–1981)

- Also known as: Sydney Chyte; Sydney Bernard Kyte
- Born: Solomon Barnett Chyte; 1 June 1896; Spitalfields, London, England
- Died: 29 July 1981 (aged 85) Chelmsford, Essex, England
- Genres: British dance band
- Occupations: Musician; Bandleader
- Instrument: Violin
- Labels: Regal, Durium, Edison Bell Winner, Panachord, Decca, Rex
- Formerly of: Savoy Orpheans

Sydney Bernard Kyte (born Solomon Barnett Chyte; 1 June 1896 – 29 July 1981) was a British dance band leader and violinist who became known in the 1930s, when he led the resident band at The Piccadilly Hotel in London's West End. Kyte made numerous recordings, and remained active into the 1950s.

== Early life ==
Kyte, who was Jewish, was born in Spitalfields, east London, in 1896. As a 13-year-old boy, he took part in a performance of classical music at the Salle Érard which was reviewed in The Daily Telegraph. The newspaper wrote that his solo performance "showed promise". Kyte studied at the Royal Academy of Music, winning a scholarship at the age of 15, and was later an associate of the academy. He joined the Royal Life Guards in 1914.

== Career ==
Kyte achieved prominence as deputy leader of the Savoy Orpheans dance band, whom he began recording with in 1926 as their violinist. He also played the violin on recordings by The Sylvians, another Savoy Hotel band, in 1927. This was followed by short stints at The Berkeley hotel and Ciro's nightclub.

During the 1930s, Kyte was musical director at The Piccadilly Hotel in central London, which he and his band played and broadcast from. In 1939, it was estimated that apart from Henry Hall, no other bandleader had achieved as many hours of radio broadcasting as Kyte, at over 700 hours. By that point, Kyte had been resident bandleader at the hotel for six years. His signature song was "Tune In, Keep Listening" by Harry S. Pepper and John Watt. After his stint at the Piccadilly, Kyte toured the UK.

His fame was such that he was one of 25 dance band leaders featured on a 1936 set of Lambert & Butler cigarette cards. According to this profile, he enjoyed fishing, "particularly for octopuses off the coast of Majorca". It also noted that he was musical director to the Duke of Westminster. Kyte and his orchestra appeared in the 1937 musical film Saturday Night Revue.

In October 1931, Kyte began his recording career as a bandleader, in a session with the Piccadilly Hotel Band for Regal which included the popular song "Life is Just a Bowl of Cherries". His band recorded regularly for Regal until September 1932. That month, he moved to the Durium label, where he led their Durium Dance Band. The following year, Kyte's band switched to Edison Bell Winner for three sessions. After a break from recording of over 18 months, he started recording for Panachord in 1935. In 1936, the band were with Decca for three sessions. This was followed by a recording session for Rex in June 1939, which saw the end of his regular studio sessions. Among the titles recorded by Kyte were "Paradise", "The Sun Has Got His Hat On", "Stars Fell on Alabama" and "A Pretty Girl is Like a Melody". Vocalists on his recording sessions included Anona Winn and Sam Costa.

The last Kyte show on BBC Radio was a June 1942 broadcast for the Forces Programme network.

== Personal life and death ==
Kyte married his wife Amy in Westminster in 1928. From the 1930s to the 1960s, he lived in Golders Green, Middlesex (now Greater London). He survived Amy by three years and died on 29 July 1981, aged 85. He had latterly lived in Great Leighs, near Chelmsford, Essex.
