= Boodle (short story collection) =

Boodle also The Saint Intervenes
- The 1936 issue cover
- Author: Leslie Charteris
- Language: English
- Series: The Saint
- Genre: Mystery, Short Stories
- Publisher: Hodder and Stoughton
- Publication date: August 1934
- Publication place: United Kingdom
- Media type: Print (hardback & paperback)
- Preceded by: The Misfortunes of Mr. Teal
- Followed by: The Saint Goes On

Boodle is a collection of short stories by Leslie Charteris, first published in the United Kingdom by Hodder and Stoughton in August 1934. This was the thirteenth book to feature the adventures of Simon Templar, alias "The Saint", and the second short story collection featuring the character. The title is taken from the British slang term "boodle" meaning bribery, stolen goods or loot (it is also a term frequently used by Templar). When first published in the United States by The Crime Club, the unfamiliar-sounding title was changed to The Saint Intervenes, and this title was later applied to future UK editions.

As with the earlier collection, The Brighter Buccaneer, Boodle consists of stories written by Charteris under contract with the UK magazine Empire News during 1933. One story, "The Man Who Liked Toys", was first published in The American Magazine as a non-Saint story featuring a lead character named Kestry; Charteris later revised the story to include the Saint. Three stories, "The Noble Sportsman", "The Art Photographer", and "The Mixture as Before" received their first publication in Boodle.

== Stories ==
The book consists of between 12 and 14 stories, depending upon the edition:

1. The Ingenuous Colonel – Two con men try to swindle a young man in a horse racing scam, never realising their mark is Simon Templar. The story indicates that Templar has returned to Britain after an absence of some time, suggesting that it might take place around the time of "The Simon Templar Foundation", the lead story in the previous book, The Misfortunes of Mr. Teal, which likewise takes place at a time when Templar is re-establishing himself.
2. The Unfortunate Financier – Templar's girlfriend, Patricia Holm, goes undercover as she plays secretary for a financier who is manipulating Middle East oil stocks.
3. The Newdick Helicopter – When the Saint hears how his friend Monty Hayward (last seen in The Brighter Buccaneer) was swindled by a man with false claims of inventing a new form of helicopter, he sets out to turn the tables on the "inventor". Although the word helicopter appears in the title, in the story itself the flying machine is referred to as an autogyro.
4. The Prince of Cherkessia – When a foreign prince orders a jewelled crown to be made for him during his visit to London, it's up to Chief Inspector Claud Eustace Teal to make sure the crown doesn't fall into the hands of The Saint. This story marks the return of Peter Quentin (last seen in "The Unusual Ending", the concluding story of The Brighter Buccaneer).
5. The Treasure of Turk's Lane – When a land developer tries some underhanded tactics to get a friend of Simon's to sell his ancestral home in order that an apartment block can be built on the site, Templar is determined to make sure the developer pays through the nose to get it. However the old house has one final surprise in store for both the developer and the Saint.
6. The Sleepless Knight – Sir Melvin Flager's trucking company forces its drivers behind the wheel for hours on end with little sleep. After a cyclist is killed by one of Flager's sleep-deprived drivers, Templar decides to give Flager a bit of his own medicine.
7. The Uncritical Publisher – When budding author Peter Quentin finds himself in the middle of a scam involving a crooked vanity publisher, the Saint intervenes. In this story, Charteris parodies himself and the British publishing industry.(This was not published in the 1st edition as Hodder and Stoughton were worried about the light it held publishers in. It This story is also included in a booklet in the DVD boxset of The Saint Colour Series)
8. The Noble Sportsman – Templar and Teal find themselves investigating a murder at the home of a British politician, an event that leaves the Saint unusually remorseful.
9. The Damsel in Distress – An Italian family hires Templar to assist in kidnapping a bond forger from his refuge in Switzerland and returning him to Britain for a shotgun wedding. Soon Templar finds himself in the middle of a blackmail scheme.
10. The Loving Brothers – Two squabbling businessmen, who happen to be brothers, fight over the last will and testament of their late father, with the Saint intervening.
11. The Tall Timber – Templar impersonates a Scotland Yard inspector to bring down a small-time swindler selling a big-time scam involving tree-growing in Brazil.
12. The Art Photographer – Templar impersonates an Australian businessman with a taste for pornography to expose a blackmail scheme involving naughty photographs and scantily clad models.
13. The Man who Liked Toys – Teal and Templar investigate the apparent suicide of a man with a penchant for playing with toys.
14. The Mixture as Before – The Saint turns the tables on a scam artist who claims he can make genuine diamonds in his bathtub. This is the second time Templar has matched wits with a would-be alchemist; in "The Gold Standard", a novella in Once More the Saint, he went up against a man who claimed he could create gold.

== Variation ==
For reasons unknown, later British editions of this collection omit either one or both of the two stories "The Uncritical Publisher" and "The Noble Sportsman". "The Uncritical Publisher" has been released by the Saint Club and as a DVD extra.

== Publication history and alternate titles ==
Most of the stories, save for three - noted as applicable - were first published in the UK newspaper Empire News, and most were retitled for omnibus publication (alternate titles listed where applicable). The Empire stories are collected in the order of first publication:

- "The Ingenuous Colonel" - 1 October 1933 (as "Keep an Eye on the Clock"
- "The Unfortunate Financier" - 8 October 1933 (as "The Whipping of Titus Oates")
- "The Newdick Helicopter" - 15 October 1933 (as "The Inventions of Oscar Newdick")
- "The Prince of Cherkessia" - 22 October 1933 (as "The Vanishing of Prince Schomyl")
- "The Treasure of Turk's Lane" - 29 October 1933
- "The Sleepless Knight" - 5 November 1933 (as "The Slave-Driver Sees the Red Light")
- "The Uncritical Publisher" - 12 November 1933 (as "The Smashing of Another Racket")
- "The Noble Sportsman" - first publication; later reprinted in Thriller - 9 February 1935
- "The Damsel in Distress" - 19 November 1933 (as "The Kidnapping of the Fickle Financier")
- "The Loving Brothers" - 26 November 1933 (as "Green Eye of the Greedy Brothers")
- "The Tall Timber" - 3 December 1933 (as "The Moustache and the Tea-Cup")
- "The Art Photographer" - first publication
- "The Man Who Liked Toys" - first publication as a Saint story; previously published featuring a different protagonist in American Magazine, September 1933
- "The Mixture as Before" - first publication

== Television adaptations ==
"The Noble Sportsman" was adapted for the TV series The Saint during its second season, first airing on 9 January 1964. (The story itself was one of two that was not included in British editions of the book.)

Three stories were adapted for the programme's third season: "The Loving Brothers" (19 November 1964), "The Man Who Liked Toys" (26 November 1964), and "The Damsel in Distress" (31 December 1964).

"The Newdick Helicopter" was retitled "The Chequered Flag" and aired on 1 July 1965, as the first episode of the fourth season.
