= Alias the Saint =

- 1936 edition
- Author: Leslie Charteris
- Language: English
- Series: The Saint
- Genre: Mystery fiction
- Publisher: Hodder and Stoughton
- Publication date: 1931
- Publication place: United Kingdom
- Media type: Print (hardback & paperback)
- Preceded by: Featuring the Saint
- Followed by: She Was a Lady

Alias the Saint is a collection of three mystery novellas by Leslie Charteris, first published in the United Kingdom in May 1931 by Hodder and Stoughton. This was the sixth book to feature the adventures of Simon Templar, also known as "The Saint". The three stories had previously been published in The Thriller magazine in the UK.

The first American publication of Alias the Saint occurred in 1931 through The Crime Club as part of the compilation Wanted for Murder, which also included the contents of the previous book, Featuring the Saint.

A variation of Alias the Saint was published in the United States in the 1950s by Avon Books and later reprinted by Charter Books in the 1970s. This version, subtitled "Selections from Wanted for Murder" contains only two stories: "The National Debt" (originally published in the UK Alias the Saint) and "The Man Who Could Not Die", which was originally published in the UK edition of Featuring the Saint. A complete edition of the original Alias the Saint was first published by Fiction Publishing Company in the early 1960s.

"The Story of a Dead Man" was the first Saint novella to be published after the character's introduction in the 1928 novel Meet - The Tiger!, appearing in the UK magazine Thriller in March 1929 ( Although the original version in The Thriller issue 4 features a character called Jimmy Traill rather than The Saint), followed by "The National Debt" in April under the title "The Secret of Beacon Inn". Both stories were passed over by Charteris when he was compiling his first two novella collections Enter the Saint and Featuring the Saint and were rewritten when he chose to include them in Alias the Saint.

== Stories ==
The book consisted of the following stories:

1. The Story of a Dead Man - Inspector Teal becomes suspicious when he discovers The Saint claiming to have reformed and working as an office manager.
2. The Impossible Crime - An unusually bored Templar agrees to help Teal solve a crime involving a man in a locked room who had apparently been shot to death. This story marks the first appearance of Templar's colleague Duncarry, a New York City detective who once pursued Templar on a case, but is now considered one of the Saint's inner circle. This warming of relations between Templar and Scotland Yard (if not necessarily Teal) would continue into the next book, She Was a Lady.
3. The National Debt - Templar assumes the identity of Professor Ramses Smith in order to investigate a group of modern-day pirates based in South Wales who kidnapped a beautiful young chemist after doping her with a mind-altering drug that turned her (briefly) into a mindless killer.

== Publication history ==
The three stories were previously published in Thriller magazine:

- "The Story of a Dead Man" - 2 March 1929 (the version in Alias the Saint is a revised/rewritten draft)
- "The Impossible Crime" - 7 March 1931 (as "Bumped Off")
- "The National Debt" - 6 April 1929 (the version in Alias the Saint is a revised/rewritten draft)

== Television adaptation ==
Two of the stories in this collection were adapted as episodes of the third season of The Saint.

"The Impossible Crime" was retitled "The Contract" and first aired on 7 January 1965. "The National Debt" was retitled "The Crime of the Century" and first aired on 4 March 1965.
