= Saturday Night Revue =

1937 film

- Webster Booth in the film.
- Directed by: Norman Lee
- Written by: Vernon Clancey
- Produced by: Warwick Ward
- Starring: Billy Milton; Sally Gray; John Watt
- Cinematography: Bryan Langley
- Production company: Welwyn Studios
- Distributed by: Pathé Pictures
- Release date: 27 October 1937
- Running time: 77 minutes
- Country: United Kingdom
- Language: English

Saturday Night Revue is a 1937 British musical film directed by Norman Lee and starring Billy Milton, Sally Gray and John Watt. It was written by Vernon Clancey, and was made as a quota quickie.

== Plot ==
Two nightclubs share the name "Moons", one in Soho, and one in Mayfair. Mary Dorland sings at the cheap Soho club, but her father, who disapproves of her chosen career, believes she is at the upmarket Mayfair club. When a BBC radio broadcast includes both clubs, he learns the truth. Meanwhile Mary's singing partner Jimmy Hanson has rescued gangster Duke O'Brien from being shot by his jilted fiancée Ann. Later, when Jimmy is injured in a collision with a car containing Duke's mobsters, Duke pays for a doctor to treat Jimmy's eye injury. The story has a happy ending with Jimmy and Mary getting engaged.

== Cast ==
- Billy Milton as Jimmy Hanson
- Sally Gray as Mary Dorland
- John Watt as himself
- Betty Lynne as Ann
- Edward Ashley as Duke O'Brien
- Julian Vedey as Monty
- Charles Carson as Mr. Dorland
- Mary Jerrold as Mrs. Dorland
- Gerry Fitzgerald as himself
- Reg Bolton as himself
- Webster Booth as himself
- Sydney Kyte and his Band as themselves
- John Reynders and the BBC Orchestra as themselves
- Billy Reid and his Band as themselves with vocalist Dorothy Squires
- Strad as group leader

== Reception ==
The Monthly Film Bulletin wrote: "A spectacular musical production. ... The story is loosely put together. But the photography is pleasing and the broadcasting scenes, round which the film really centres, make the film well worth seeing. John Watt, of the B.B.C., is delightful at the microphone, and the varied performances of vaudeville and stage shows from provincial town halls are entertaining. Those who appreciate the sound of the English voice will like this film, though the sound reproduction, otherwise good, gave an unpleasant hissing in some of the sibilants."

The Daily Film Renter wrote: "Sketchy story touching vicissitudes of singer sweethearts who rise from obscurity of cheap Scho night-club to broad-casting success. Narrative highlights include hint of gangster melodrama and touches of poignancy arising out of scene where blind hero recovers sight. Major entertainment springs from interpolation of noted turns, with Sydney Kyte and his Band, Webster Booth, Stanford and McNaughton, Bennett and Williams, etc., topping 'bill,' and B.B.C.'s urbane John Watt in form as radio program arranger! Agreeable light offering for masses, with plenty of honest-to-goodness entertainment."
