= Follow the Saint =

- 1939 UK edition
- Author: Leslie Charteris
- Language: English
- Series: The Saint
- Genre: Mystery, Novellas
- Publisher: Hodder & Stoughton (UK); The Crime Club (US)
- Publication date: 1938
- Publication place: United Kingdom
- Media type: Print (hardback & paperback)
- Preceded by: Prelude for War
- Followed by: The Happy Highwayman

Follow the Saint is a collection of three mystery novellas by Leslie Charteris, featuring the criminal and crimefighter Simon Templar, alias The Saint. The collection was first published in 1938.

Follow the Saint marked a change in the publication order for the Saint books. Up to this point, the books were always published first in the United Kingdom, followed by an American publication later in the year or sometimes a year later. The order was switched beginning with this book, with the American edition (by The Crime Club) preceding the UK edition by Hodder and Stoughton, which was not released until 1939.

== Stories ==
The book consisted of the following stories:

1. "The Miracle Tea Party" — Simon Templar investigates an unprovoked attack on his "nemesis", Scotland Yard Chief Inspector Claud Eustace Teal, which appears to be connected to the smuggling of high-denomination pound sterling notes hidden inside tea bags.
2. "The Invisible Millionaire" — Templar is invited to meet a young woman at a secret rendezvous where she plans to provide information regarding a major swindle. The case becomes complicated when the Saint and his assistant Hoppy Uniatz find the woman stabbed to death, with Templar (as usual) blamed for her murder. Templar and Uniatz don't know what to think when their accusers subsequently invite them to come home for dinner.
3. "The Affair of Hogsbotham" — Self-appointed guardian of public morality Ebenezer Hogsbotham annoys Templar with his attempt to turn Britain into a chaste society, so Templar decides to bring him down a peg or two by robbing his home. But Templar and Uniatz invade the wrong house and find themselves in the midst of a bank-robbing conspiracy.

== Television adaptations ==
Two of the stories were later adapted as episodes of the TV series The Saint. "The Invisible Millionaire" aired on February 13, 1964, during the programme's second season. "The Miracle Tea Party" opened the third season on October 8, 1964.
