= Cafe Colette =

1937 film

- Directed by: Paul L. Stein
- Written by: Val Gielgud; Walford Hyden; Eric Maschwitz; Katherine Strueby; Val Valentine
- Produced by: W. Devenport Hackney
- Starring: Paul Cavanagh; Greta Nissen; Sally Gray; Bruce Seton
- Cinematography: Ronald Neame
- Music by: Walford Hyden
- Production company: New Garrick Productions
- Distributed by: Associated British
- Release date: 1937
- Running time: 71 minutes
- Country: United Kingdom
- Language: English

Cafe Colette (also known as Danger in Paris) is a 1937 British thriller film directed by Paul L. Stein and starring Paul Cavanagh, Greta Nissen (in her final film role) and Sally Gray. It was written by Val Gielgud, Walford Hyden, Eric Maschwitz, Katherine Strueby and Val Valentine, and was made at Wembley Studios as a quota quickie.

== Preservation status ==
The British Film Institute National Archive holds a collection of ephemera and stills but no film or video materials.

== Plot ==
Vanda Muroff works as a dancer at Café Colette, the covert headquarters of an international espionage gang. She is tasked with extracting the secret formula for a powerful explosive from British intelligence officer Roger Manning. Unknown to Roger, his sister Jill becomes a dancer at the same café. When Vanda falls in love with Roger and abandons her assignment, her fellow spies plot to strike back using the innocent Jill. However, Ryan – the star operative of the British Secret Service – is lurking nearby disguised as an artist. At the last moment, he defeats the gang and saves Jill.

== Cast ==
- Paul Cavanagh as Ryan
- Greta Nissen as Vanda Muroff
- Sally Gray as Jill Manning
- Bruce Seton as Roger Manning
- Paul Blake as Ethelred Burke
- Donald Calthrop as Nick
- Dino Galvani as Josef
- Fred Duprez as Burnes
- Cecil Ramage as Petrov
- C. Denier Warren as compere

== Reception ==
Kine Weekly wrote: "Lavishly mounted espionage musical melodrama designed principally to cash in on the popularity of the Cafe Colette radio hour. The story veers slightly towards the novelettish, but good cabaret material is resourcefully plugged, thereby permitting the somewhat incongruous mixture to evolve into popular entertainment. The cast is good in parts, and the technical qualities excel."

The Daily Film Renter wrote: "Melodrama with night club background, constructed around famous B.B.C. feature introducing Walford Hyden and his Orchestra. ... Fair suspense, romantic and comedy angles, Paul Cavanagh doing good work in a somewhat vague role. Movement leisurely, and climax somewhat obvious. Opportunities to exploit famous broadcasting orchestra neglected."
