= Charles Eaton (British actor) =

English actor

Charles Eaton was an English actor known for his stiff upper lip roles in British films of the 1930s and 40s. He appeared in a number of films by the director Maurice Elvey, his most prominent role being that of Captain Royde in Elvey's Who Goes Next? (1938).

== Filmography ==
- D'Ye Ken John Peel (1935)
- Double Alibi (1937)
- Who Goes Next? (1938)
- The Gaunt Stranger (The Phantom Strikes) (1938)
- Blondes for Danger (1938)
- Lightning Conductor (1938)
- Sword of Honour (1938)
- Sons of the Sea (1939)
- Under Your Hat (1940)
