= Who Goes Next? =

- Jack Hawkins and Sophie Stewart
- Directed by: Maurice Elvey
- Written by: J. W. Drawbell; David Evans; Lawrence Green
- Produced by: Ivor McLaren
- Starring: Barry K. Barnes; Sophie Stewart; Jack Hawkins
- Cinematography: Ronald Neame
- Music by: Colin Wark
- Production company: Twentieth Century-Fox
- Distributed by: Twentieth Century-Fox
- Release date: March 1938
- Running time: 85 minutes
- Country: United Kingdom
- Language: English

Who Goes Next? is a 1938 British war drama film directed by Maurice Elvey and starring Barry K. Barnes, Sophie Stewart and Jack Hawkins. The story was inspired by the escape of 29 officers through a tunnel from Holzminden prisoner-of-war camp in Lower Saxony, Germany, in July 1918.

== Premise ==
During the First World War, a number of captured British officers attempt to escape from a prisoner-of-war camp.

== Main cast ==
- Barry K. Barnes as Maj. Hamilton
- Sophie Stewart as Sarah Hamilton
- Jack Hawkins as Capt. Beck
- Charles Eaton as Capt. Royde
- Andrew Osborn as F/O Stevens
- Frank Birch as Capt. Grover
- Roy Findlay as Lt. Williams
- Alastair Macintyre as Lt. Mackenzie
- Meinhart Maur as Commandant

== Production ==
The film was made at Wembley Studios by Twentieth Century Fox. It was a more expensive production than the quota quickie releases that Fox had previously been making at Wembley.

== Bibliography ==
- Hanson, Neil (2011). Escape from Germany: The Greatest PoW Break-out of the First World War. London: Doubleday. ISBN 978-0-385-61204-3.
- Low, Rachael (1985). The History of the British Film, 1929–1939: film making in 1930s Britain. London: George Allen & Unwin. ISBN 9780047910425.
- Wood, Linda (1986). British Films, 1927–1939. London: Library Services, British Film Institute. ISBN 9780851701899.
