= Cheer Up (film) =

1936 British film by Leo Mittler

- Directed by: Leo Mittler
- Written by: Stanley Lupino; Michael Barringer
- Produced by: Stanley Lupino
- Starring: Stanley Lupino; Sally Gray; Roddy Hughes; Gerald Barry
- Cinematography: Curt Courant
- Edited by: Ronald Deeming
- Music by: Percival Mackey
- Production company: Stanley Lupino Productions
- Distributed by: Associated British Film Distributors
- Release date: February 1936
- Running time: 72 minutes
- Country: United Kingdom
- Language: English

Cheer Up is a 1936 British comedy film directed by Leo Mittler and starring Stanley Lupino, Sally Gray and Roddy Hughes. It was written by Lupino and Michael Barringer.

== Plot ==
An impoverished team of composer and songwriter try to secure financial backing for their new musical, with the assistance of a struggling actress working as a housemaid.

== Cast ==
- Stanley Lupino as Tom Denham
- Sally Gray as Sally Gray
- Roddy Hughes as Dick Dirk
- Gerald Barry as John Harman
- Kenneth Kove as Wilfred Harman
- Wyn Weaver as Mr. Carter
- Marjorie Chard as Mrs. Carter
- Ernest Sefton as Tom Page
- Syd Crossley as waiter
- Arty Ash as head porter
- Arthur Rigby as Bill Ratchett
- Doris Rogers as Mrs. Pearce

== Reception ==
Kine Weekly wrote: "The pick-up of this musical comedy is not too good, it makes a far from snappy and confident start, but once the simple plot takes tangible shape, and Sally Gray is permitted to join the experienced comedy team, good light entertainment comes the picture's way. The song numbers have melody, and the changes are rung on these and the slapstick interludes effectively until the stage is set for the grand finale, while the climax itself is a happy and ingenious amplification of that which has stood the test of time in legitimate stage shows. Fashioned in a popular mould, and dispensed by stellar players who know their job, the film is a first-rate comedy musical for the masses."

Picture Show wrote: "The trifling story of this musical comedy matters about as little as musical comedy stories do matter. ... Its main appeal is its dancing, music and comedy, Sally Gray, a newcomer, makes a lively and attractive leading lady."

In British Sound Films: The Studio Years 1928–1959 David Quinlan rated the film as "good", calling it: "Trifling but boisterous."

== Production ==
It was made at Ealing Studios by Lupino's own independent production company.
