= Sword of Honour (1939 film) =

1939 British film by Maurice Elvey

- Directed by: Maurice Elvey
- Written by: Gerald Elliott; Dudley Sturrock
- Produced by: Maurice Elvey
- Starring: Geoffrey Toone; Sally Gray; Dorothy Dickson
- Cinematography: Geoffrey Faithfull
- Production company: Butcher's Film Service
- Distributed by: Butcher's Film Service
- Release date: 14 August 1939
- Running time: 83 minutes
- Country: United Kingdom
- Language: English

Sword of Honour is a 1939 British drama film directed by Maurice Elvey and starring Geoffrey Toone, Sally Gray, Dorothy Dickson. Location shooting took place at Sandhurst, while interiors were shot at Walton Studios. Shortly afterwards, Elvey shot another military-themed film Sons of the Sea at Dartmouth Naval College.

== Plot ==
A recruit at Sandhurst initially makes a poor impression, but goes on to prove himself by riding in the Grand National.

== Cast ==
- Geoffrey Toone as Bill Brown
- Sally Gray as Lady Moira Talmadge
- Dorothy Dickson as Mrs Stanhope
- Donald Gray as Stukely
- Wally Patch as Pomeroy Brown
- Peter Gawthorne as Lord Carhampton
- Frederick Culley as Duke of Honiton
- Maire O'Neill as Biddy
- Gordon Begg as Grandpa Brown
- Cyril Smith as Bright
- Charles Eaton as Cameo
- Tommy Woodrooffe as Commentator
- Patrick Holt as Lord Talmadge

== Bibliography ==
- Mackenzie, S.P. British War films, 1939-1945. A&C Black, 2001.
