= Wanted for Murder =

1931 book by Leslie Charteris

Wanted for Murder also The Saint – Wanted for Murder Paging the Saint
- First edition
- Author: Leslie Charteris
- Language: English
- Series: The Saint
- Genre: Mystery
- Publisher: The Crime Club
- Publication date: 1931
- Publication place: United States
- Media type: Print (hardback & paperback)
- Preceded by: Knight Templar
- Followed by: She Was a Lady

Wanted for Murder is the title of a collection of six mystery novellas by Leslie Charteris which was first published in the United States in August 1931.

This book was part of an ongoing series of novels and novellas by Charteris featuring the adventures of his Robin Hood-inspired crimefighter, Simon Templar, alias The Saint.

Wanted for Murder holds an unusual place in the Charteris canon as this book featured the first American publication of the stories contained within the books Featuring the Saint and Alias the Saint, which were published in the United Kingdom earlier in 1931 by Hodder and Stoughton. In most cases, The Crime Club, an imprint of Doubleday, simply published American editions of the Saint books (occasionally retitled), but this was the first — and only — occasion on which The Crime Club chose not to publish two of Charteris' books, instead deciding to combine them into an American-only omnibus release.

The book was later republished by Sun Dial Press in 1943 and retitled The Saint – Wanted for Murder; Avon Books also published a pulp paperback edition. In the 1950s, an American edition of Alias the Saint appeared in paperback, however this book (subtitled "excerpts from Wanted for Murder") contained only two stories—one from Alias the Saint and one from Featuring the Saint. Complete US editions of the two books did not appear until the early 1960s; once again, these books were promoted as featuring "excerpts from Wanted for Murder". The collection was also published under the title Paging the Saint.

== Stories ==
Wanted for Murder contains the following stories:

From Featuring the Saint:

- The Logical Adventure
- The Wonderful War
- The Man Who Could Not Die

From Alias the Saint:

- The Story of a Dead Man
- The Impossible Crime
- The National Debt
