= Getaway (The Saint) =

1932 novel by Leslie Charteris

Getaway also The Saint's Getaway
- First edition
- Author: Leslie Charteris
- Language: English
- Series: The Saint
- Genre: Mystery fiction
- Publisher: Hodder and Stoughton
- Publication date: 1932
- Publication place: United Kingdom
- Media type: Print (Hardback & Paperback)
- Preceded by: The Holy Terror
- Followed by: Once More the Saint

Getaway is a mystery novel by Leslie Charteris first published in the United Kingdom in September 1932 by Hodder and Stoughton. This was the fifth full-length novel featuring the adventures of the modern day Robin Hood-inspired crimebuster Simon Templar, and the ninth Saint book published overall since 1928. When first published in the United States by The Crime Club in February 1933, the title was modified to The Saint's Getaway which was later adopted by future UK editions.

Prior to being published in book form, Getaway had appeared in serialized form in The Thriller magazine, with Part 1 published as "Property of the Deceased" on 6 February 1932 and Part 2, "Two Men from Munich", not published until 18 June 1932.

Charteris, in his introduction to a mid-1960s reprint of the book for Fiction Publishing Company, describes Getaway as the third part of a trilogy of novels that began with The Last Hero and Knight Templar.

== Plot summary ==
The novel begins approximately three weeks after the events of the story "The Melancholy Journey of Mr. Teal" from The Holy Terror. Simon Templar, accompanied by his lover/partner Patricia Holm, has departed England on a well-deserved holiday from crime-fighting.

While visiting Innsbruck, Austria with their friend, book editor Monty Hayward (making his first appearance in the series), the trio are out for a late-night walk when they see a man being attacked by thugs. They stop the attack, but the victim is particularly ungrateful, forcing Templar to knock him out, too. Intrigued by the man's attitude—as well as by a steel box attached to his wrist (which later turns out to be a miniature safe filled with recently stolen diamonds), Templar decides to take the unconscious man back to his hotel room. Before long, however, the man is stabbed to death in Templar's bed and Templar finds himself in yet another encounter with Prince Rudolf—one of the men responsible for the death of his friend Norman Kent in The Last Hero.

Simon and Patricia (with very reluctant adventurer Monty in tow) find themselves on a cross-continent race against Rudolf and his minions (who are pursuing the diamonds) and the police (who want Templar and Monty for the murder of the courier). Along the way, the trio picks up a female crime reporter who takes part in the adventure in her quest for a career-making scoop on The Saint.

Whereas the previous book, The Holy Terror, takes place over the course of nearly a year, the events of Getaway take place over little more than 24 hours. The text indicates that this story takes place about two years after the events of The Last Hero. It is the first Saint story to take place completely outside Great Britain since the novella "The Wonderful War" in Featuring the Saint.

Some editions of the novel (such as the Fiction Publishing Co. edition) omit a prologue that recaps the events of "The Melancholy Journey of Mr. Teal". According to this prologue (and later repeated within the main body of the text), the Saint has been "buccaneering" for 10 years by the time of this novel, during which time he had amassed a personal fortune of approximately 100,000 pounds, which was finally topped up by his absconding with a villain's diamonds at the end of "Melancholy Journey".

Much of the book is told from Monty Hayward's point of view. According to The Saint: A Complete History in Print, Radio, Film and Television 1928-1992 by Burl Barer, the character was based upon Charteris' real-life editor, Monty Haydon.

== Film adaptation ==
In 1941, Getaway was adapted as a motion picture by RKO as part of its ongoing Saint series. Retitled The Saint's Vacation, the film was the first to star Hugh Sinclair as Simon Templar.

Among the changes made for the film adaptation is that Rudolf now works for Nazi Germany (Hitler was not yet in power when the original book was published) and the character of Patricia Holm is absent.
