= Lightning Conductor (film) =

- Directed by: Maurice Elvey
- Written by: Joseph Jefferson Farjeon; Lawrence Green; Ivor McLaren; Evadne Price
- Produced by: Anthony Havelock-Allan
- Starring: Gordon Harker; John Lodge; Sally Gray; Ernest Thesiger
- Cinematography: Francis Carver
- Music by: Percival Mackey
- Production company: Pinebrook Studios
- Distributed by: General Film Distributors
- Release date: October 7, 1938
- Running time: 79 minutes
- Country: United Kingdom
- Language: English

Lightning Conductor is a 1938 British comedy thriller film directed by Maurice Elvey and starring Gordon Harker, John Lodge and Sally Gray. It was made at Pinewood Studios.

== Plot ==
A London bus driver becomes embroiled in a plot by foreign agents to steal secret documents.

== Cast ==
- Gordon Harker as Albert Rughouse
- John Lodge as Anderson
- Sally Gray as Mary
- Ernest Thesiger as Professor
- George Moon as George
- Steven Geray as Mortley
- Charles Eaton as Royle
- Arthur Hambling as Bus Inspector
- Roy Findlay as Dakers

== Critical reception ==
Allmovie noted a "breezy British action comedy...No mere programmer, The Lightning Conductor is exceptionally well cast, with such reliables as John Lodge, Sally Gray, Ernst Thesiger and Steven Geray going through their usual expert paces." and TV Guide called it "a suspenseful comedy with some good characterizations."
