= Sally Gray =

English film actress (1915–2006)

The Right Honourable The Lady Oranmore and Browne
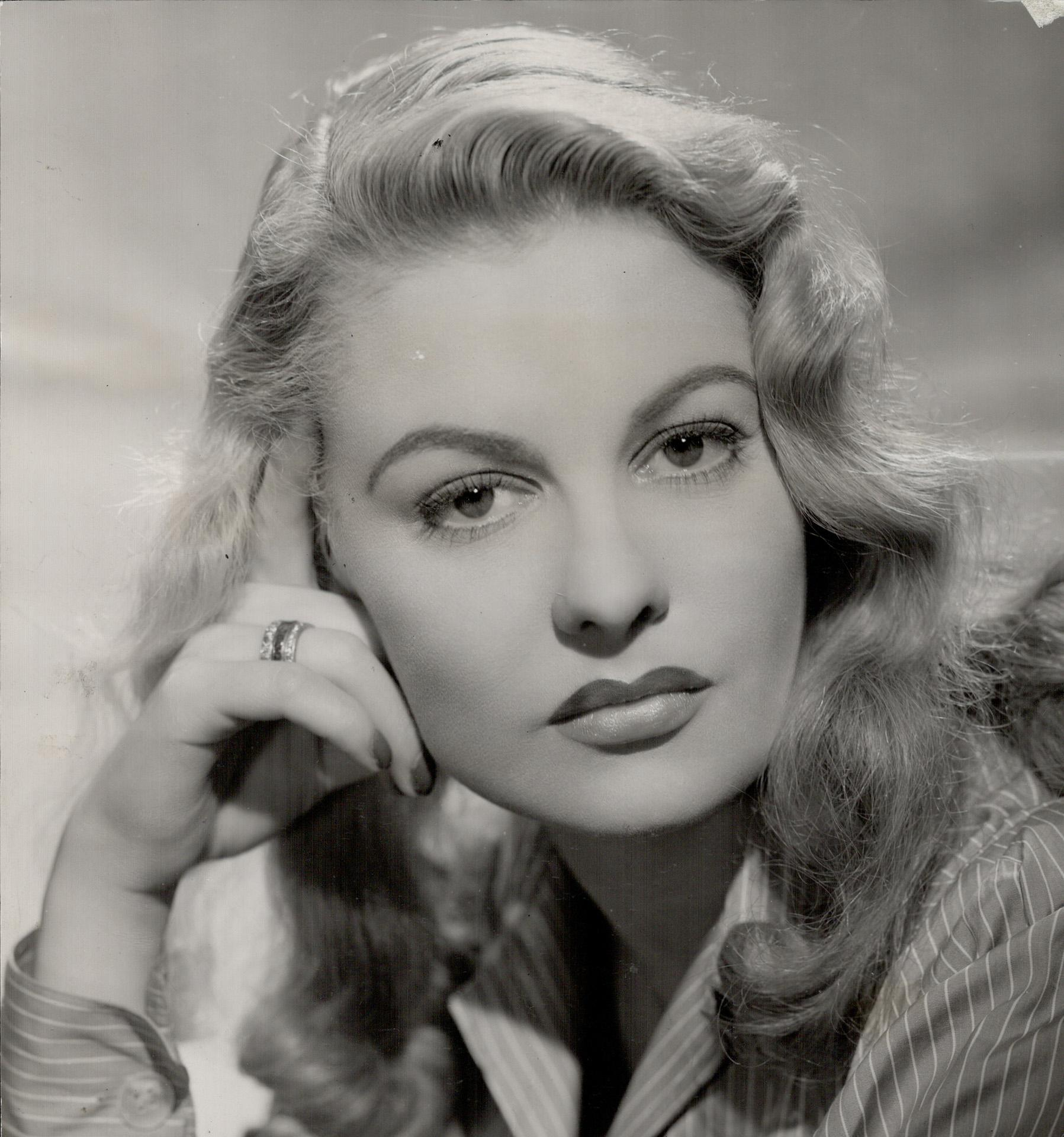

Personal details
- Born: Constance Vera Stevens; 14 February 1915 Holloway, London, England
- Died: 24 September 2006 (aged 91) London, England
- Spouse: The 4th Baron Oranmore and Browne (m. 1951, died 2002)
- Parents: Charles Stevens (father); Gertrude Grace Green (mother)

Constance Vera Browne, Baroness Oranmore and Browne (née Stevens; 14 February 1915 – 24 September 2006), commonly known as Sally Gray, was an English film actress of the 1930s and 1940s. Her obituary in The Irish Times described her as "once seen as a British rival to Ginger Rogers."

According to her obituary in The Independent: "In the Thirties she was a charming soubrette of light movies and musical comedy. After a break from performing, she emerged in the mid-Forties as a sultry beauty who starred in a series of moody dramas and potent thrillers."

== Biography ==
=== Early life ===
Constance Vera Stevens was born in Holloway, London, the daughter of Charles Stevens, who drove a taxi, and his wife, Gertrude Grace Green. Her mother was a ballet dancer and her grandmother a "principal boy" in the 1870s. Her father died when Gray was young.

=== Theatre career ===
She trained as a child at Fay Compton's School of Dramatic Art, and began acting on stage at the age of 10. Gray made her professional stage debut at the age of twelve in All God's Chillun at the Globe Theatre in London, playing an African boy. When she was 14, Gray appeared in a minstrel show at the Gate Theatre in London. She made her film debut with a bit part in The School for Scandal (1930).

She then returned to school for two years, training at Fay Compton's School of Dramatic Art, during which time she performed in cabarets.

She appeared in The Gay Divorce (1933) on stage with Fred Astaire. The agent John Gliddon saw her in the musical Jill Darling (1934) and signed her.

=== Film career ===
Gray returned to films in 1935, with The Dictator (1935). She could also be seen in Cross Currents (1935), Radio Pirates (1935), Lucky Days (1935), and Checkmate (1935). She returned on stage and was spotted by Stanley Lupino, who fell in love with her.

Gray had the female lead in Cheer Up (1936) with Lupino. She had leads in Calling the Tune (1936), Cafe Colette (1936), and Saturday Night Revue (1937) with Billy Milton. In 1936, she was earning £150 a week. Gray had support roles in Lightning Conductor (1937), a thriller; Over She Goes (1937) with Lupino; Mr. Reeder in Room 13 (1937), a non musical; and Hold My Hand (1938) with Lupino. Gray was the female lead in Sword of Honour (1938), The Saint in London (1939) with George Sanders, The Lambeth Walk (1939) with Lupino Lane, and A Window in London (1940), a non musical film with Michael Redgrave. Gray was in Olympic Honeymoon (1940) then had the female lead in The Saint's Vacation (1941). She had a sensitive role in Brian Desmond Hurst's romantic melodrama Dangerous Moonlight (1941). The same year she appeared in the West End musical Lady Behave which had been written by her co-star Stanley Lupino. The show had to close early because of Lupino's illness.

Gray returned to the stage to star in My Sister Eileen (1942) with Coral Browne. Lupino died, leaving Gray £10,000. Gray had a nervous breakdown, resulting in her retirement for several years.

=== Comeback ===
Gray returned to the screen in 1946 and made her strongest bid for stardom in a series of melodramas. They include the hospital thriller Green for Danger (1946), Carnival (1946), They Made Me a Fugitive (1947) and The Mark of Cain (1948). Gray then made Silent Dust (1948) and Edward Dmytryk's film noir piece Obsession (1949), in which she plays Robert Newton's faithless wife. Her final film was the spy yarn Escape Route (1952).

RKO executives, impressed with Gray, authorised producer William Sistrom to offer her a long-term contract if she would move to the United States. John Paddy Carstairs, director of The Saint in London, also thought she could be a star. However, she declined the offer and instead retired in 1952 after her marriage.

== Personal life ==
Gray married the 4th Baron Oranmore and Browne, an Anglo-Irish peer, on 1 December 1951, and thereafter lived for several years at Castle Macgarrett, near Claremorris, in County Mayo in the west of Ireland. The couple kept the marriage secret until the 1953 coronation of Elizabeth II, at which she appeared with her husband.

In the early 1960s, they returned to England and settled in a flat in Eaton Place, Belgravia, London. The couple had no children.

== Death ==
The Dowager Lady Oranmore and Browne died in London on 24 September 2006, at 91 years of age,

== Filmography ==
=== Film ===
Year	Title	Role	Notes	Ref.
1930	The School for Scandal	Bit part	(uncredited)	
1935	The Dictator	Minor role	Released as Loves of a Dictator in the U.S. (uncredited)	
1935	Cross Currents	Sally Croker		
1935	Radio Pirates			
1935	Lucky Days	Alice		
1935	Checkmate	Jean Nicholls		
1936	Cheer Up	Sally Gray		
1936	Calling the Tune	Margaret Gordon		
1937	Cafe Colette	Jill Manning	Released as Danger in Paris in the U.S.	
1937	Saturday Night Revue	Mary Dorland		
1938	Lightning Conductor	Mary		
1938	Over She Goes	Kitty		
1938	Mr. Reeder in Room 13	Claire Kent	Released as Mystery of Room 13 in the U.S.	
1938	Hold My Hand	Helen Milchester		
1939	Q Planes	Minor role	Released as Clouds Over Europe in the U.S. (uncredited)	
1939	Sword of Honour	Lady Moira Talmadge		
1939	The Saint in London	Penny Parker		
1939	The Lambeth Walk	Sally	Released as Me and My Girl in the U.S.	
1940	A Window in London	Vivienne	Released as Lady in Distress in the U.S.	
1940	Olympic Honeymoon	Miss America		
1941	The Saint's Vacation	Mary Langdon		
1941	Dangerous Moonlight	Carol Peters Radetzky	Released as Suicide Squadron in the U.S.	
1946	Green for Danger	Nurse Linley		
1946	Carnival	Jenny Pearl		
1947	They Made Me a Fugitive	Sally Connor	Released as I Became a Criminal in the U.S.	
1947	The Mark of Cain	Sarah Bonheur		
1949	Silent Dust	Angela Rawley		
1949	Obsession	Storm Riordan	Released as The Hidden Room in the U.S.	
1952	Escape Route	Joan Miller	Released as I'll Get You in the U.S.	

== Sources ==
- Film Star Who's Who on the Screen 1938. London, UK: Amalgamated Press. December 1937.
- Tom Vallance (3 October 2006). "Husky-voiced, sultry beauty of Forties thrillers who retired from acting to marry a peer". The Independent. London.
