= Escape Route (film) =

1952 British film by Seymour Friedman

- U.S. theatrical release poster
- Directed by: Seymour Friedman; Peter Graham Scott
- Written by: John Baines; Nicholas Phipps
- Produced by: Ronald Kinnoch
- Starring: George Raft; Sally Gray; Clifford Evans; Reginald Tate
- Cinematography: Eric Cross
- Edited by: Tom Simpson
- Music by: Hans May
- Production company: Banner Films
- Distributed by: Eros Films (UK); Lippert Pictures (USA)
- Release date: December 1952
- Running time: 77 minutes
- Country: United Kingdom
- Language: English

Escape Route is a 1952 British black-and-white second feature thriller film, directed by Seymour Friedman and Peter Graham Scott, and starring George Raft, Sally Gray and Clifford Evans.

The film was released in the USA as I'll Get You (not to be confused with an earlier Raft film, I'll Get You for This (1951)).

== Plot ==
An American, Steve Rossi, enters Britain by slipping past immigration at Heathrow Airport, leading to a national manhunt by the police led by Scotland Yard. Rossi heads into London where he tracks down Bailey, a barman, and asks him about Michael Grand. The barman passes him a note with an address which leads him to a woman, who says she does not know Grand. She agrees to change Rossi's US currency and buy him a coat while he waits in her flat. For money, she gives him another address: Kingston House, a swanky block of flats on Kingston Road. He takes a taxi there and meets Joan Miller who acknowledges it is Grand's flat, saying she is his secretary and he is not there. She claims that Grand is not going to return, but calls Grand who agrees to meet. Rossi wants to stay put in Grand's flat but Joan pulls a gun on him and together they drive to an old terraced house where Wilkes starts quizzing Rossi. Rossi says that Grand offered him a job, working on aircraft design. Joan is asked to accommodate Rossi in her own flat.

Meanwhile the police post Rossi's picture in all the newspapers and quiz various underworld figures to try to locate him. The taxi driver recognises the picture. Joan Miller is revealed to be an MI5 agent. Rossi reveals himself to be an FBI agent posing as a nuclear scientist in an attempt to infiltrate a gang kidnapping western scientists and taking them across the Iron Curtain. Grand has recently arranged the kidnap of an American. With MI5's assistance, Rossi monitors Grand and arranges a meeting with him. Growing increasingly suspicious of Rossi, Grand and his organisation make several attempts to kill him.

Rossi and Joan follow Grand's assistant Irma Brookes, in an attempt to find him. Brookes and a body with some of Grand's ID is found in a burned-out car. Rossi is caught and taken to Hammersmith Police Station. It is explained that Rossi wanted to get into the papers so that Grand would be aware of his presence. Rossi cannot identify the body in the mortuary as Grand as he is unsure of his appearance.

Grand is finally revealed when Max, another taxi driver, informs him of what he has seen both at the burning car and near the mortuary. Rossi dons a naval uniform and tails Grand on foot through empty streets in the city, leaving a chalk trail of markers for Joan to follow. Grand goes to the River Thames where the low tide allows him to walk along the edge. They end up at the Old Swan Pier near London Bridge. Grand pulls a gun and a scuffle begins. Grand escapes to a rooftop of a grain elevator close to The Monument. They end up fighting on an external freight lift heading back to the ground. Rossi wins and the police arrive.

== Cast ==
- George Raft as Steve Rossi
- Sally Gray as Joan Miller
- Clifford Evans as Michael Grand
- Frederick Piper as Inspector Reid
- Reginald Tate as Colonel Wilkes
- Patricia Laffan as Irma Brookes
- June Ashley as beauty shop attendant
- John Warwick as Security Chief Brice
- Roddy Hughes as porter
- Grace Arnold as neighbour
- Cyril Chamberlain as Bailey
- Howard Douglas as taxi driver
- Arthur Lovegrove as Phillips
- Anthony Pendrell as Rees
- Norman Pierce as Inspector Hobbs
- Harry Towb as Immigration Officer

== Production ==
The film was made at Walton Studios and on location around London, mostly in the City of London, at a time when there was still much bomb damage from the Second World War. American actress Coleen Gray was reported to have been cast opposite Raft, but the role was eventually played by the English star Sally Gray. It was one of several films made by British companies in connection with the low-budget American outfit Lippert Pictures, which distributed the film in the United States. It was made on a larger budget than most Lippert releases.

== Critical reception ==
Monthly Film Bulletin said "This is a poor imitation of an American type second-feature thriller, lacking originality, punch and even credibility, and ending with a near-ludicrous chase through deserted dockland."

Kine Weekly said "The picture takes the longest route to its spectacular ending, but budding romance helps to colour the padding. Towards the end there is a sensational sequence in which two charred bodies are discovered in a burnt-out car and this sets the mood for the big scrap climax, and rovides additional compensation for rambling reliminaries. A lively finisher, and topical at that, the thriller unquestionably has popular appeal."

The Los Angeles Times said the film was "so mysterious" the filmmakers "almost succeeded in keeping the story to themselves."

The Radio Times Guide to Films gave the film 2/5 stars, writing: "George Raft gives a fair impression of a man who has had his arms welded to his sides in this dismissable quickie thriller. One of the handful of films Raft made in Europe after his Hollywood fortunes dipped, it's a lightweight affair."

Leslie Halliwell said: "A moderate co-feature, as unremarkable as its plot."

In British Sound Films: The Studio Years 1928–1959 David Quinlan rated the film as "mediocre", calling it: "Slow and hardly credible."

Chibnall and McFarlane in The British 'B' Film wrote: "The film made outstanding use of London locations from the West End to docklands, but the suspense was not augmented by the emotional monotone of Raft's performance, which was as wooden as his floating namesake."
