= Once More the Saint =

1933 collection of novellas by Leslie Charteris

Once More the Saint also The Saint and Mr. Teal
- 1937 edition
- Author: Leslie Charteris
- Language: English
- Series: The Saint
- Genre: Mystery
- Publisher: Hodder and Stoughton
- Publication date: 1933
- Publication place: United Kingdom
- Media type: Print (hardback & paperback)
- Preceded by: Getaway
- Followed by: The Brighter Buccaneer

Once More the Saint is a collection of three interrelated mystery novellas by Leslie Charteris, first published in the United Kingdom by Hodder and Stoughton in January 1933. This was the tenth book to feature the adventures of Simon Templar, alias "The Saint". The first American edition, published in May 1933, changed the title to The Saint and Mr. Teal, which was later adopted by UK editions of the book. (Mr. Teal refers to Scotland Yard Inspector Claud Eustace Teal, a recurring character.)

The first two stories in the book were originally published in the UK magazine, Thriller in 1932, with the third story being written exclusively for the book.

== Stories ==
The book, which picks up soon after the events of the previous full-length novel, Getaway, consisted of the following stories (designated as Part One, Part Two, and Part Three):

1. The Gold Standard - In Paris, Simon Templar finds a mortally wounded man who claims his brother can create gold. Upon returning to England, Templar finds himself pursued by the man's murderer. The man, known as Jones, kidnaps Templar's girlfriend, Patricia Holm, leading Templar to discover the truth about the alchemy, which results in the Saint choosing to become judge, jury and executioner for Jones. The leads to a narrow escape for Templar when Inspector Teal arrives on the scene. This story takes place two months after the events of the novella "The Melancholy Journey of Mr. Teal" from The Holy Terror, and includes considerable character development of both Teal and Holm. Holm is shown asserting herself more than in previous stories, challenging Templar about both his treatment of Teal in this and previous stories (asking Templar at one point when "open season" on Teal is expected to end), and at the end questions Templar's decision to kill Jones. Templar would go up against another would-be alchemist in "The Mixture As Before", a short story in Boodle.
2. The Man from St. Louis - Tex Goldman, a small-time crime boss from the U.S., comes to London and sets up his own American-style gang, the Green Cross Gang. He soon finds himself in a pitched battle against The Saint, who (with unofficial encouragement from Mr. Teal) sets out to prevent London from becoming another Chicago, along the way dodging assassination attempts, including a bomb that destroys part of Simon and Patricia's new home in London. In order to stop Goldman's string of killings and robberies, Templar decides to kill the gangster, but relents at the last minute when he learns that Goldman has just been married and has promised his new wife that he'll turn over a new leaf; he settles for capturing Goldman's trigger man, instead. This story takes place three months after the events of "The Gold Standard" and is unusual for its lack of resolution—Goldman apparently goes free, despite indicating his plan to conduct a major heist soon. (The Green Cross Gang returns in the short story "The Export Trade" included in the next book, The Brighter Buccaneer; however, that short story was actually published in a magazine before "Man from St. Louis", therefore Templar is unfamiliar with the group in that piece.)
3. The Death Penalty - Soon after the events of the above story (with interior decorators still repairing the bomb damage), Templar gives up the lease on his new flat and he and Patricia move into a swank London hotel. But an unusual heat wave drives the two out of the city to the remote Isles of Scilly where Simon has learned an African dope smuggler whom he encountered five years earlier is joining forces with a British counterpart, adding white slavery into the mix. When his target ends up being killed by one of his victims, it is up to the Saint to arrange things so that the victims of the smuggler go free and the truly guilty parties are punished.

== Publication history ==
Two of the three stories had previously been published under different titles in Thriller magazine:

- "The Gold Standard" - 15 October 1932 (as "The Gold Flood")
- "The Man from St. Louis" - 19 November 1932 (as "Hi Jacker")

== Television adaptation ==
All three stories in this collection were adapted as episodes of The Saint.

"The Death Penalty" was first broadcast during the show's third season on December 3, 1964. "The Man from St. Louis" was retitled "The Set-Up" and aired on January 14, 1965. "The Gold Standard" was retitled "The Abductors" and aired on July 8, 1965, as part of the fourth season.
