= The Holy Terror (short story collection) =

1932 collection of novellas by Leslie Charteris

The Holy Terror also The Saint vs. Scotland Yard
- 1938 edition
- Author: Leslie Charteris
- Language: English
- Series: The Saint
- Genre: Mystery
- Publisher: Hodder and Stoughton
- Publication date: 1932
- Publication place: United Kingdom
- Media type: Print (hardback & paperback)
- Preceded by: She Was a Lady
- Followed by: Getaway

The Holy Terror is a collection of three mystery novellas by Leslie Charteris, first published in the United Kingdom in May 1932 by Hodder and Stoughton. This was the eighth book to feature the adventures of Simon Templar, alias "The Saint". When published in the United States for the first time, in September 1932, the title was changed to The Saint vs. Scotland Yard.

The three stories in the book are loosely interconnected and take place over the course of roughly nine months, according to the text. This book is notable for bringing Patricia Holm back into the forefront. The character, depicted as Templar's on again-off again girlfriend since the first book in the series, Meet - The Tiger!, had been virtually relegated to cameo appearance status after the novel The Last Hero and had been absent from a number of stories and novels since. Here she becomes an active participant in Templar's schemes once again. Charteris does not obscure the clear implication that the unmarried Templar and Holm are living together at the time of these stories—something that is commonplace today but was rare in popular fiction in the early 1930s.

== Stories ==
The book consisted of the following stories, labelled as "Part One", "Part Two", and "Part Three".

1. The Inland Revenue: Simon finds himself up against an undefeatable enemy — the taxman — when Inland Revenue pursues him for back taxes after Templar publishes a novel. In order to come up with the money, Templar and his girlfriend, Patricia Holm, hatch a scheme to capture a blackmailer known as The Scorpion whose exploits have already led to a murder and several suicides. Templar's plan is complicated by a promise made to Inspector Claud Eustace Teal that he won't kill the villain this time. In this story it is established that his "Saints" gang of earlier books has been disbanded for some time and that Templar himself has (temporarily at least) given up the mantle of The Saint. Incidentally the above-mentioned novel that Simon Templar supposedly wrote is titled The Pirate and features a non-anglo super-brigand/hero named Mario. Charteris in his early years wrote a novel, The Bandit, which also features a non-anglo super-brigand/hero.
2. The Million Pound Day: While returning home to London after a brief holiday in Cornwall, Templar rescues a delirious man from the hands of a thug. When the man recovers, Templar and Patricia discover a scheme to undermine a new issue of Italian paper currency with unauthorized and counterfeit bills. This story takes place several months after the events of "The Inland Revenue", and as the story ends, Templar finds himself running afoul of Inspector Teal more so than usual.
3. The Melancholy Journey of Mr. Teal: Six months after the "Million Pound Day", Templar finds himself a few hundred pounds short of having 100,000 pounds in his bank account—enough to (for a while) retire. He sets his eyes on relieving two murderous diamond smugglers of their ill-gotten loot. When his scheme goes awry, however, Templar's long-simmering feud with Inspector Teal (which dates back to Enter the Saint) finally comes to a boil, and Templar finds himself not only on the run from Teal, but in order to ensure that he gets the diamonds, he is forced to also help one of the smugglers escape. (The title of the book, The Holy Terror comes from a description Templar gives of himself in this story.) This story leads directly into the next Saint book, Getaway.

Some editions of this book include an introduction, "Between Ourselves", in which Charteris discusses the philosophy of The Saint, promising that despite recent negative reviews in some publications, he had no intention of retiring from writing about Simon Templar (indeed, Charteris would continue to write stories about the character until the early 1960s, after which he would serve in an editorial capacity on further Saint adventures up until 1983).

== Publication history ==
The three novellas were previously published, two under different titles, in the magazine Thriller:

- "The Inland Revenue" - 25 April 1931 (as "The Masked Menace")
- "The Million Pound Day" - 6 June 1931
- "The Melancholy Journey of Mr. Teal" - 8 August 1931 (as "The Kidnapped Killer")

== Film and Television adaptation ==
"The Million Pound Day" formed the basis for the 1939 film, The Saint in London which starred George Sanders as Templar. (This should not be confused with the Simon Templar book The Misfortunes of Mr. Teal, which was also published under the title The Saint in London.) In addition, the plot point in "The Melancholy Journey of Mr. Teal" in which Templar strives to top up his bank account and retire was adapted for the 1997 film version of The Saint.

"The Inland Revenue" was adapted as an episode of The Saint. Retitled "The Scorpion" the episode first aired on 29 October 1964 as part of the third season.
