= Daredevil (novel) =

1929 novel by Leslie Charteris

- First edition cover
- Author: Leslie Charteris
- Language: English
- Series: none, but related to The Saint
- Genre: Mystery novel
- Publisher: Ward Lock
- Publication date: 1929
- Publication place: United Kingdom
- Media type: Print (Hardback)

Daredevil is a mystery novel by Leslie Charteris which was first published by Ward Lock in 1929 (followed by an American edition that same year by The Crime Club). This was Charteris' fourth full-length novel, and is one of the few full-length books in his canon that does not feature the character of Simon Templar, alias "The Saint". However, the book does have a connection to the Saint series.

The novel was a follow-up to an earlier work entitled X Esquire, which was Charteris' first novel, published in 1927. Daredevil followed the exploits of Christopher "Storm" Arden, described as "the fighting daredevil". The character featured many elements that would later be incorporated into The Saint (including the car he drove, a Hirondel, of the type later used by Simon Templar in the early Saint novels and stories).

The most notable element of the book is that it featured the first appearance of Scotland Yard Inspector Claud Eustace Teal, the gum-chewing detective who later became a recurring character in the Simon Templar novels, novellas, and short stories starting in 1929 (Templar had been introduced in the 1928 novel, Meet - The Tiger! but this book did not feature Teal; the earliest stories to feature Teal and Templar together can be found in the 1930 collection Enter the Saint).

Other than the character, there is no indication of narrative continuity between this novel and the Saint series, and it has never been reprinted alongside the Saint books.

Charteris would go on to write one further novel in 1929, The Bandit, before focusing almost exclusively on writing Simon Templar adventures (with a few exceptions) for the remainder of his literary career.
