= Silent Dust =

1949 British film by Lance Comfort

- Theatrical release poster
- Directed by: Lance Comfort
- Written by: Michael Pertwee
- Produced by: Nat A. Bronstein
- Starring: Sally Gray; Stephen Murray; Derek Farr; Nigel Patrick
- Cinematography: Wilkie Cooper
- Music by: Georges Auric
- Production company: ABPC
- Distributed by: Associated British-Pathé
- Release dates: 1 February 1949 (UK); 29 December 1949 (U.S.)
- Running time: 82 minutes
- Country: United Kingdom
- Language: English
- Budget: £149,854
- Box office: £161,055 (UK)

Silent Dust is a 1949 British drama/thriller film directed by Lance Comfort and starring Sally Gray, Stephen Murray, Derek Farr and Nigel Patrick. The title comes from lines in Thomas Gray's Elegy Written in a Country Churchyard (1751): "Can Honour's voice provoke the silent dust, or flattery soothe the dull cold ear of Death?" The screenplay was by Michael Pertwee, adapted from the 1948 play The Paragon by himself and Roland Pertwee.

== Plot ==
Simon Rawley is reported killed in the last days of World War II, and his blind father Robert decides to build a cricket pavilion in his memory in the local village. His neighbour Lord Clandon urges him to extend the dedication to all the local men who gave their lives in the war, but Robert refuses. Planning and construction take some time and three years pass, during which Simon's widow Angela falls in love with local doctor's son Maxwell Oliver whilst they have both been posted to Occupied Germany after the war. Robert cannot help feeling that this is disloyal to his dead son, but his second wife Joan does her best to convince him that Angela is entitled to search for happiness again. The pavilion is finally completed and plans are in place for the grand dedication and opening. The local police are meanwhile looking for a villain who coshed a motorist and stole his car in London, and has dumped the car in the vicinity.

Robert surprises an intruder in the house that evening. He is closely followed by Angela, who to her great shock recognises her "dead" husband Simon. He signals to her not to let Robert know his identity. Later he comes up with elaborate excuses to Angela to explain his resurrection and lack of contact since the war, but she soon sees through the lies. It is subsequently revealed that, far from dying a hero's death on the battlefield, Simon was a deserter who faked his own death. Since the war he has been making a living on the wrong side of the law as a black-marketeering spiv. Now down on his luck, he has returned (in the stolen car) to try to extort money. It is also shown that soon after their marriage, Angela had discovered that Simon was not the man she had believed him to be, and she had had a very unhappy time with him, something Joan had realised, but Robert, blind in this way as well as physically, had no inkling of the truth.

Angela has to let Joan in on Simon's return from the dead, and the two try desperately to shield Robert from the knowledge of his son's return in such circumstances, aware that the shattering of his illusions would destroy him. The unscrupulous Simon, learning of Angela's new attachment to Maxwell, demands £5,000 to leave for good. Robert gradually comes to realise that something very strange is going on, and little by little manages to piece together that Simon is in hiding somewhere in the house. He finally manages to track him down and a struggle ensues, climaxing with Simon falling to his death from a balcony. A visiting Lord Clandon, who has seen Robert's portrait of his son, suggests they remove the portrait from view before the police arrive to deal with the 'stranger' intruder. With his son's perfidy finally revealed to him, Robert agrees to change the dedication of the pavilion, as Lord Clandon had requested all along.

== Cast ==
- Sally Gray as Angela Rawley
- Stephen Murray as Robert Rawley
- Derek Farr as Maxwell Oliver
- Nigel Patrick as Simon Rawley
- Beatrice Campbell as Joan Rawley
- Seymour Hicks as Lord Clandon
- Yvonne Owen as Nellie
- Marie Lohr as Lady Clandon
- James Hayter as Pringle
- George Woodbridge as foreman
- Irene Handl as cook

== Production ==
The film was shot in film noir style with dramatic use of light and shadow.

Part of the finance came from two rubber merchants, Colonels Weil and Prior.

== Reception ==
=== Box office ===
Trade papers called the film a "notable box office attraction" in British cinemas in 1949. As of 1 April 1950 the film earned distributor's gross receipts of £105,859 in the UK of which £66,979 went to the producer.

=== Critical reception ===
The Monthly Film Bulletin wrote: "This is a tense drama of a father's blind devotion to his son, and the disillusion that follows when he learns his true character. Simon's presence in the house unbeknown to his blind father creates an atmosphere of suspense which cleverly leads to a dramatic climax. This is done by effective and unusual photography representing a blind man's mental vision. Stephen Murray gives a convincing performance as the blind, ostentatious Sir Robert. Sally Gray is good as Angela, and Seymore Hicks provides comedy relief. The best performance, however, comes from Nigel Patrick, who successfully registers every emotion of the unstable Simon. The plot is original, moves excitingly, and drama and suspense are combined in a well-made film."

A contemporary review in the Australian newspaper The Age credited it as "first-class screen fare ... strong drama ... [which] combines a good and arresting story with first class acting".

The New York Times found the film to have "considerable merit as drama" and singled out Murray's "acutely sharp characterisation" for praise, but felt that overall it was somewhat let down by "[showing] its stage heritage in a number of static sequences which rob it of much-needed vitality".

The Radio Times Guide to Films gave the film 1/5 stars, writing: "This is supposed to be a provocative treatise on the nature of heroism, but is nothing more than a mawkish drama with a shamelessly sentimental performance by Stephen Murray, whose rose-tinted image of his son is tarnished by the truth."

Leslie Halliwell said: "Effective stage melodrama, quite neeatly filmed."
