= She Was a Lady =

1931 novel by Leslie Charteris

She Was a Lady also Angels of Doom also The Saint Meets His Match
- First edition
- Author: Leslie Charteris
- Language: English
- Series: The Saint
- Genre: Mystery novel
- Publisher: Hodder and Stoughton
- Publication date: 1931
- Publication place: United Kingdom
- Media type: Print (Hardback & Paperback)
- Preceded by: Alias the Saint (UK); Wanted for Murder (US)
- Followed by: The Holy Terror

She Was a Lady is the title of a mystery novel by Leslie Charteris featuring his creation, Simon Templar, alias The Saint. The novel was first published in serialized form in the magazine Thriller in February and March 1930, and after being rewritten by Charteris, was first published in complete form in the United Kingdom by Hodder and Stoughton in November 1931. This was the seventh book chronicling Templar's adventures, and the fourth full novel.

Like other early Simon Templar novels, this book underwent a number of name changes in succeeding editions. When first published in the United States by The Crime Club in 1932, it carried the title Angels of Doom. Most editions published after 1941 carry the title The Saint Meets His Match with the exception of a 1982 Ace Charter Books reprint that revived the Angels of Doom title.

According to The Saint: A Complete History in Print, Radio, Film and Television 1928-1992 by Burl Barer, Charteris originally wrote the novel with a different leading character, and it was subsequently published in a magazine in this form. He later extensively revised the novel, turning it into a Simon Templar adventure.

== Plot ==
After years of living on the wrong side of the law, Simon Templar has been pardoned for past (perceived) crimes and is now working as an agent of Scotland Yard. His first mission is to investigate a crime ring called the Angels of Doom, which specializes in (among other things) helping convicted felons escape police dragnets and ambushes. The Angels of Doom is run by Jill Trelawney, a young woman who is willing to condone just about any action—including the murder of The Saint, if needs be—in her quest to wreak havoc on Scotland Yard, which she blames for the death of her father. But Templar, in his pursuit of Trelawney, finds within her an unexpected kindred spirit.

The book is divided into three parts and could almost be seen as a trilogy of novellas. The first part details Templar investigating Trelawney and discovering the cause of her criminal actions, ultimately resulting in him allowing Trelawney to kill one of the men responsible for framing her father, which has the effect of dissolving the Angels of Doom. During this part we learn that the Saint lives in Upper Berkeley Mews, Mayfair, "where the Saint had converted a couple of garages, with the rooms above, into the most ingeniously comfortable fortress in London" and that he has a manservant there called Orace.

Subsequently, in the second part, Templar's status as a police agent apparently comes to an end as he and Trelawney go to Paris in pursuit of a second man believed to be connected to the death of Trelawney's father. As the Paris segment of the novel begins, Templar and Trelawney have become partners to the extent that Simon, when leaving his traditional "calling card" consisting of the drawing of a stick figure with a halo, is now compelled to add a female figure to the image.

Meanwhile, Inspector Claud Eustace Teal of Scotland Yard continues to pursue both the Saint and Trelawney, especially when he receives reports that the two have allegedly reactivated the Angels of Doom.

The third segment of the novel sees Templar and Trelawney pursuing the third and final man responsible for framing her father, but in doing so they must first recruit some unexpected help from within Scotland Yard itself.

The book ends with several metafictional references by Templar, who makes references to himself being a storybook character in search of a suitable epilogue for the book. He also makes a direct reference to the title of the American omnibus collection Wanted for Murder which had preceded this novel. She Was a Lady is also notable in that no reference is made to any of the Saint's past colleagues, including his girlfriend, Patricia Holm, making this one of the first books in the series to have such an omission. (This is possibly because, as mentioned above, the novel was not originally conceived as a Saint adventure).

== Film adaptation ==
She Was a Lady was adapted for the screen in 1939 as the basis for the second Hollywood motion picture based upon the character of Simon Templar. The film, The Saint Strikes Back, was released by RKO Pictures and was the first film to star George Sanders as Templar. The film makes numerous changes to the original story, changing Jill Trelawney's name to Val Travers and eliminating the angle of the Saint and Trelawney/Travers partnering up. One element from the book that is the retained is the first (and only) use of a female version of the Saint's stick figure insignia.
