= Knight Templar (The Saint) =

1930 novel by Leslie Charteris

Knight Templar also The Avenging Saint
- 1938 edition
- Author: Leslie Charteris
- Language: English
- Series: The Saint
- Genre: Mystery fiction
- Publisher: Hodder and Stoughton
- Publication date: 1930
- Publication place: United Kingdom
- Media type: Print (Hardback & Paperback)
- Preceded by: The Last Hero
- Followed by: Featuring the Saint (UK); Wanted for Murder (US)

Knight Templar is the title of a mystery novel by Leslie Charteris first published in October 1930. This was the fourth book—and third full novel—featuring Charteris's Robin Hood-inspired anti-hero, Simon Templar, alias "The Saint". The title of the book is a pun on the religious organization Knights Templar. Later editions were titled The Avenging Saint and the book is also well known by this title, which was first used in a 1931 edition.

== Plot summary ==
The novel, a direct sequel to its predecessor, The Last Hero sees Templar and his organization taking revenge on an arms dealer named Rayt Marius, following the death of one of Templar's friends.

The book starts approximately three months after the events of The Last Hero. Simon Templar and his associate, Roger Conway, have been spending much of that time chasing Marius and his superior, Prince Rudolf (Crown Prince of an unidentified country) across Europe. Templar suspects that Marius and Rudolf are planning to follow through with their scheme to spark a new World War (continuing from The Last Hero), and in any event, Templar has sworn to kill whichever of the two men murdered his friend Norman Kent at the close of the previous adventure.

Although Templar had been forced to flee England at the end of the previous novel, he has since found himself back in Britain and again on the trail of Marius. While executing a scheme to root Marius out from hiding by infiltrating a bogus nursing home, Templar and Conway rescue who they initially think is an elderly man held prisoner by one of Marius's compatriots; Templar soon discovers that they've actually rescued the beautiful daughter of a millionaire upon whose safety relies world peace. The woman, Sonia Delmar, subsequently joins Templar's fight against Marius (who Templar learns is the man who killed Norman) and Prince Rudolf, even going so far as to allowing herself to be kidnapped by the villains.

Templar is said to be 29 years old in this tale.

In this book, Sonia Delmar becomes the romantic female lead, replacing Templar's girlfriend of the previous books, Patricia Holm, who is referenced only briefly in the story as being on a cruise in the Mediterranean (this same excuse was used by Charteris to remove the character from much of the action in Enter the Saint as well). This was the first book to indicate the "open" nature of Templar and Holm's relationship, although in this case Templar makes clear that his heart remains with Holm.

The final chapter of the book contains a somewhat metafictional reference in that Templar indicates his intent to give his notes regarding the Marius affair to "a writer friend" with the idea of his turning them into a novel—a reference to Leslie Charteris himself. (This same literary device has also been employed by the likes of Arthur Conan Doyle in his Sherlock Holmes books and Ian Fleming in his James Bond novel You Only Live Twice.) And finally, perhaps in a nod to the developing continuity of the "series", Charteris brings Detective-Inspector Carn (MEET THE TIGER) back for a brief reunion with Templar at the climax.

A later Saint novel, Getaway, completed the trilogy begun by The Last Hero and Knight Templar. The ultimate fate of Rayt Marius would be revealed in the novella "The Simon Templar Foundation" in The Misfortunes of Mr. Teal.
