= John Watt (broadcaster) =

British broadcaster and producer (1901–1960)

- Born: John Ernest Watt; 27 October 1901; Blackheath, London, England
- Died: 23 February 1960 (aged 58); Brighton, England
- Spouse: Violette (m. 1927)
- Career
- Show: Workers' Playtime; ITMA
- Network: BBC Radio

John Watt (27 October 1901 – 23 February 1960) was a British broadcaster and producer.

Watt was born on 27 October 1901 at 4 Hidbrooke Park Road, Blackheath, London, to Richard Watt, a solicitor, and Minnie (née Dale). He went to Cranleigh School and University College London.

Among the shows he worked on as the BBC's Director of Variety were Workers' Playtime and ITMA.

He appeared as a castaway on the BBC Radio programme Desert Island Discs on 3 December 1956.

Watt died on 23 February 1960 at home in Montpelier Street, Brighton. His wife Violette (they married in 1927) survived him; she wrote professionally, under the pen name of Angela Jeans.
