= The Saint in London =

1939 film by John Paddy Carstairs

- Directed by: John Paddy Carstairs
- Written by: Lynn Root; Frank Fenton
- Based on: "The Million Pound Day"; 1932 story by Leslie Charteris
- Produced by: William Sistrom
- Starring: George Sanders; Sally Gray
- Cinematography: Claude Friese-Greene
- Edited by: Douglas Robertson
- Music by: Marr Mackie
- Distributed by: RKO Radio Pictures
- Release date: 30 June 1939
- Running time: 77 min.
- Country: Great Britain
- Language: English
- Budget: £35,834

The Saint in London is a 1939 British crime film, the third of eight films in RKO's film series featuring the adventures of Simon Templar, alias "The Saint".

It stars George Sanders as Templar and was produced by William Sistrom. John Paddy Carstairs directed. Lynn Root and Frank Fenton wrote the screenplay based on Leslie Charteris' short story "The Million Pound Day", which was published in the 1932 collection The Holy Terror, published in the United States as The Saint vs. Scotland Yard.

== Plot ==
Simon Templar, alias "the Saint," meets and hires a reformed pickpocket and ex-convict named Dugan. Templar is recruited by Sir Richard Blake of British Intelligence to investigate Bruno Lang, a suspected spy. Templar tails Lang to his home after meeting a beautiful, adventurous young woman named Penny Parker, who has been fascinated by his exploits. He steals evidence against Lang from his safe, and she helps him escape.

As they flee back to London, they rescue a terrified and tortured French diplomat who had been abducted by Lang and his henchmen. Templar takes the diplomat, Count Duni, to an inn for safekeeping. The count's country sent him to supervise the printing of new currency, and that he had been forced to authorize the secret printing of more than a million pounds, with which Lang and his partners mean to split among themselves.

Templar's actions have drawn the attention of his friendly rival from Scotland Yard, Inspector Teal. Kussella captures Penny and tells Templar to come to him alone. Rescuing her with Dugan's help, they return to the inn to find Duni murdered and Templar framed by an unknown party. Teal, however, is aware of the frame and lets Templar escape to help him pursue the true killers.

Duni had contacted a man named Stengler at his embassy shortly before he was murdered. When Templar, Penny, and Dugan descend upon Lang's house to find Stengler, Dugan is knocked out, Penny is tied up, and Templar has an hour to return the evidence he stole in exchange for her and Dugan's safety. Templar disarms Lang and rescues Penny and Dugan. Kussella is fatally shot by mistake by one of his co-conspirators.

Back at Scotland Yard, Templar and the others are waiting in Teal's office with Blake. Teal arrests Lang and Stengler for espionage and murder, Blake clears Templar, and Templar takes his leave of Penny before she can form any romantic attachments.

== Cast ==
- George Sanders as Simon Templar / The Saint
- Sally Gray as Penny Parker
- David Burns as Dugan
- Gordon McLeod as Inspector Claud Teal
- Henry Oscar as Bruno Lang
- Athene Seyler as Mrs. Buckley
- John Abbott as Count Stephen Duni
- Ralph Truman as Kussella
- Charles Carson as Mr. Morgan
- Carl Jaffe as Stengler
- Norah Howard as Mrs. Morgan
- Ballard Berkeley as Sir Richard Blake
- Charles Paton as Tobacco Shop Proprietor

== Production ==
The film was shot in London from an American script. Sanders arrived there in March 1939, and the picture was ready for release in June.

== Reception ==
Critics gave both George Sanders and The Saint in London excellent notices. Roscoe Williams of Motion Picture Daily wrote, "Customers need not have followed the Saint series up to this point to collect a full measure of satisfaction from this best of the pictures about the detective who masquerades as a criminal. It was expertly directed by John Paddy Carstairs. George Sanders' performance in the title role is a splendid achievement." William R. Weaver of Motion Picture Herald agreed: "The Saint in London is by far the best of the Saint pictures. It is the best detective melodrama of recent months. George Sanders' portrayal of the well dressed detective who poses as an international criminal is a masterful interpretation." Showmen's Trade Review reported, "This newest Saint picture sets a new high in the popular mystery series, and one which will require high future standards to maintain. Sanders definitely hits the stride of this debonair hero. David Burns is also effective as a comedian."

The film made a profit of $140,000. According to Saint historian Burl Barer, Charteris considered The Saint in London to be the best of the RKO film series. He admired director Carstairs' work enough to dedicate the book The Saint in the Sun to him; Carstairs is also the only person to direct not only RKO Saint films, but also two episodes of the 1962–69 series The Saint.
