= Enter the Saint =

1930 book by Leslie Charteris

- First edition (UK)
- Author: Leslie Charteris
- Language: English
- Series: The Saint
- Genre: Mystery fiction
- Publisher: Hodder and Stoughton (UK)
- Publication date: 1930
- Publication place: United Kingdom
- Media type: Print (hardback & paperback)
- Preceded by: Meet the Tiger
- Followed by: The Last Hero

Enter the Saint is a collection of three interconnected adventure novellas by Leslie Charteris first published in the United Kingdom by Hodder and Stoughton in October 1930, followed by an American edition by The Crime Club in April 1931.

This was the second book featuring the adventures of Charteris' Robin Hood-inspired anti-hero, Simon Templar, alias "The Saint". It followed the 1928 novel, Meet the Tiger which introduced the character. In the introduction to a 1983 republishing of Enter the Saint as part of an omnibus collection by Avenel Books, Charteris identifies the three stories in this collection as being the first stories written about Templar (not counting Meet the Tiger), although other sources such as the website Saint.org list Enter the Saint as the third Saint book after the novel The Last Hero (this, however, is not correct as The Last Hero makes direct reference to events in the Enter the Saint stories).

The stories in Enter the Saint mark the first series appearance of Scotland Yard Inspector Claud Eustace Teal, a character that Charteris had introduced in the 1929 novel, Daredevil.

The three novellas in the book are:

1. "The Man Who Was Clever": Simon Templar seeks to bring a drug smuggler to justice. In this story, Templar is shown in the process of establishing his reputation as a crime buster working with a team of mysterious individuals (akin to Robin Hood's Merry Men). Patricia Holm, Templar's love interest and fellow adventurer from Meet the Tiger, appears briefly in a cameo. The "calling card" at his "crimes," a stick figure of a man with a halo over his head, makes its first appearance.
2. "The Policeman with Wings": A direct follow-up to the above, this story shows Templar's reputation continuing to grow as he and his compatriot Roger Conway investigate two kidnappings connected to a bag of stolen diamonds. This story also features the Saint's first direct dealings with Insp. Claud Eustace Teal, who would become a regular ally/adversary throughout the series. Norman Kent, a member of Templar's group who plays a major role in The Last Hero receives a brief mention.
3. "The Lawless Lady": Templar appears only briefly in this story which focuses on one of Templar's agents, Dicky Tremayne, who infiltrates a crime ring intent on some seaside larceny, only to fall in love with its female leader. Although the previous two stories and Meet the Tiger indicate that Templar is not averse to using deadly force, this is the first Saint story in which Templar is actually shown killing anyone. Most of the story takes place outside of the United Kingdom, the first of what would be many international Saint adventures, although it wouldn't be until "The Wonderful War", a story in the Featuring the Saint collection, that a story would be completely set outside of the country.

In "The Lawless Lady", Patricia Holm states that she and the Saint have been in love for a year, and "The Policeman with Wings" indicates that Templar is 28 years old, which means the events of these stories take place about a year after the events of Meet the Tiger. The three stories introduce a cast of supporting characters who make up Templar's team (referred to at one point in this book as "Saints"); only Patricia Holm and Templar's butler, Orace, had appeared in the previous book. The introductions of Roger Conway and Dicky Tremayne, the two operatives featured prominently in this volume, are perfunctory and it is left to the reader to assume that they have a longstanding relationship with the Saint. Several other members of "the Saints" are mentioned briefly, but would make their proper introductions in later books.

The book includes an apparent continuity error. In two of the stories, it is stated that Patricia Holm is on a Mediterranean cruise (along with one of "The Saints", Norman Kent) during the events of "The Policeman With Wings" and "The Lawless Lady" (suggesting the two stories take place back-to-back), however in the former story Holm makes an appearance at the end and again appears at the beginning of the latter.

In "The Man Who Was Clever", the Saint is described by another character as being South African as a ruse. The Saint's nationality is never made explicit, though he is fairly obviously English (on screen he has usually been played by British actors, although he has also been portrayed by actors from South Africa, France, Australia and the United States).

Following Enter the Saint, Charteris wrote two full-length novels featuring Templar before returning to the novella form in Featuring the Saint in 1931. For the next 30 years Charteris would alternate between novel, novella, and short story formats; this would continue after other authors began writing the Saint series in the 1960s.

== Variations ==
As with other Saint books, many different editions of Enter the Saint have been published over the years, although unlike many early Simon Templar collections, it appears never to have been published under any other title. Not all editions include all three stories. The 1983 Avenel omnibus includes only "The Man Who Was Clever" and "The Lawless Lady", while a 1960s edition by Fiction Publishing Company (an imprint of Doubleday) omits "The Man Who Was Clever"; both despite the fact that the three stories are interconnected. Charteris wrote introductions to both editions, suggesting that he was aware of (and therefore possibly approved or requested) the omissions.

== Publication history ==
The three novellas were published in the magazine Thriller prior to being collected:

- "The Man Who Was Clever" - 4 May 1929 (as "The Five Kings")
- "The Policeman with Wings" - 24 August 1929 (as "The House on the Moors")
- "The Lawless Lady" - 19 October 1929 (as "Crooks Cargo")

== Television adaptation ==
"The Lawless Lady" was adapted as an episode of The Saint starring Roger Moore and first broadcast on 30 January 1964. The basic storyline of the episode, however, is substantially different from the original. This is the earliest Charteris story to be adapted for the TV series.

Enter the Saint was also the title of a BBC Radio documentary on Simon Templar and Leslie Charteris, broadcast in 1998.
