= Claud Eustace Teal =

Fictional character

- The Saint character
- Ivor Dean as Teal.
- First appearance: Daredevil (1929)
- Created by: Leslie Charteris
- Portrayed by: Gordon McLeod; Charles Victor; Campbell Singer; Norman Pitt; Wensley Pithey; Ivor Dean; David Ryall; John Baddeley; Alun Armstrong

In-universe information
- Gender: Male
- Occupation: Chief inspector Scotland Yard
- Nationality: British

Claud Eustace Teal is a fictional character who made many appearances in a series of novels, novellas and short stories by Leslie Charteris featuring The Saint, starting in 1929. A common spelling variation of his first name in reference works and websites is Claude; however, in his works Charteris spells it without the 'e'.

== History ==
Teal was a London-based police detective for Scotland Yard, with which he initially held the rank of Inspector. He first appeared not in a Saint story, but in a 1929 novel entitled Daredevil as a friend of that book's hero, "Storm" Arden. When Charteris decided to launch an ongoing series of stories featuring his Robin Hood-inspired anti-hero, Simon Templar (a.k.a. The Saint) in late 1929, he imported the character of Teal though it's not known if Daredevil plays any role in the actual continuity of the Saint series. (The first Saint story, 1928's Meet - The Tiger!, predated Daredevil and featured a character named Detective Carn, who was a template for the later Teal.)

== Backstory ==
Teal first appeared opposite Simon Templar in several novella-length stories that appeared in the UK magazine Thriller in the spring and summer of 1929; several were published in 1930 as the collection Enter the Saint (which is where most readers were first exposed to Teal), though the earliest stories in the series would not be published in book form until they were rewritten and included in a later collection, Featuring the Saint.

At some point, Teal received a promotion to Chief Inspector and he is identified with this rank for the first time in the short story collection The Brighter Buccaneer.

Teal is described as a heavy set, blue-eyed, perpetually weary policeman who, instead of smoking (a common behaviour during the era), had mints regularly. Little if any family life is indicated for the character. According to Daredevil, however, he had married at the age of 22. It isn't known whether Teal had mints in an attempt to quit smoking; the Wrigley's Spearmint brand is frequently mentioned by name (and even illustrated on the cover of some editions of Saint books that involve Teal).

Teal's relationship with Templar varies throughout the long-running Saint series. In the earliest parts, "The Saint" was a mysterious criminal that Teal was hunting. In the later part, Teal already knows The Saint is Simon Templar—gets to know him very well—but finds it difficult to obtain proof of his law-breaking that would stand in court. Sometimes they are adversaries, with Teal striving to put Templar behind bars and stop his "law-bending" crimefighting ways. Templar, in return, baits Teal frequently and in The Holy Terror goes so far as to blackmail Teal (an action that earns Templar a rare rebuke from his girlfriend and partner, Patricia Holm, in the later book, Once More the Saint ).

At other times, Teal and Templar maintain a cordial relationship bordering on friendship. Indeed, in several of the early Saint books (including The Holy Terror ), Teal states outright that he would consider Templar a friend if they weren't on the opposite sides of the law. For his part, Templar is shown to always have a fresh stick of chewing gum ready to give to Teal during his frequent visits, though Teal is less appreciative of Templar's habit of poking him in his expansive belly whenever he wants to emphasize a point (or sometimes just for the fun of it, as occurs several times in The Misfortunes of Mr. Teal ).

Despite giving an air of being weary and slow-moving, Teal is a brilliant detective, and one whom Templar occasionally underestimates. He also has demonstrated the ability to exhibit surprising dexterity and speed when the need arises. (In one early story, he braves entering a gas-filled cellar – at grave risk of being gassed to death himself – in order to carry an unconscious Templar to safety, an action he later half-jokingly regrets.) In The Misfortunes of Mr. Teal, Charteris states outright that Teal's weary, sloth-like demeanor is an affectation. In several Saint stories, Teal is shown unexpectedly noticing a detail or uncovering a clue that more often than not hinders Templar's quest for "boodle" (loot), as in, for example, the story "The Unusual Ending" in The Brighter Buccaneer.

Teal, however, is also shown acknowledging Templar's crimefighting and deduction abilities on numerous occasions. Although an attempt to make Templar an agent of Scotland Yard meets with failure (as seen in the novel She Was a Lady ), Teal is often seen turning to Templar for advice and, occasionally, "off-book" assistance on a case. Templar, in return, willingly allows Teal to receive the credit (and, sometimes, the blame) when a case is resolved, though he is quick to berate Teal whenever he feels Teal is treating him unfairly and with undue suspicion.

Teal disappears from the book series for a time after the 1939 short story collection The Happy Highwayman, as the Saint entered into a series of books set in America during World War II, reappearing after the war.

In "The Talented Husband" (a short story in the 1956 collection The Saint Around the World ) the Saint returns to the UK and indulges in one final round of 'Teal-baiting' before the Chief Inspector retires. Published more than a quarter century after Teal's literary debut, this was one of the few occasions in which Charteris acknowledged the passing of time in the Saint books, as he otherwise depicted Templar as an ageless hero. Teal is persuaded out of retirement in Le Saint contre les Cagoules Grises (one of the many French-language Saint novels published in the late 1950s–1960s and based upon one of the American comic strips) to help the Saint battle the Grey Hoods. Teal later returned in the 1975 collection Catch the Saint, which featured two novellas set prior to the Second World War.

Teal was considered a major character by Charteris, so much so that he named a 1934 volume The Misfortunes of Mr. Teal. (Later editions of 1933's Once More the Saint were also retitled The Saint and Mr. Teal.)

== Portrayals ==
Teal has appeared in numerous film and TV adaptations of The Saint. Generally (though not always) dramatic depictions of Teal have presented him as a rather less competent policeman than in the novels, with his ponderous approach exaggerated at the expense of his detection abilities. In his most significant adaptation (the 1960s British television series) he is presented as almost incompetent, with his success in solving cases always down to the efforts of Simon Templar.

=== Film ===
When The Saint was first adapted for cinema by RKO Radio Pictures, five of the eight films in the RKO series were set in the United States. As a result, the character of Teal was usually replaced by Inspector Fernack, a New York detective of similar disposition who had been introduced in the novel The Saint in New York. Teal made his first RKO appearance in 1939's The Saint in London played by Gordon McLeod, and McLeod reprised the role in The Saint's Vacation (1941) and The Saint Meets the Tiger (1943). The Saint Meets the Tiger was based upon the aforementioned Meet – The Tiger!, only this time Teal replaces the character of Detective Carn.

In 1953 British Hammer Film Productions made The Saint's Return, which wasn't based on any of Charteris' stories. This film featured Charles Victor as Teal.

The most recent appearance of the character has been in the 1997 film version of The Saint, played by Alun Armstrong. Besides Templar, Teal is the only character from the original canon to appear in this loosely based film.

=== TV ===
On television, Ivor Dean played Teal as a recurring character in the 1962–69 British series, The Saint. Teal appeared in several early episodes played by other actors (Campbell Singer, Norman Pitt and Wensley Pithey respectively). Dean appeared in another role in Teal's second appearance (an episode entitled Starring the Saint) before being cast on a permanent basis. In the TV series Templar always greets Teal with mock respect: "Claud Eustace Teal, pride of Scotland Yard". Whilst Teal always gruffly refers to Templar by his surname only, Templar addresses Teal with the much more chummy "my dear Claud".

The character did not appear in the spin-off, 1978's Return of the Saint, but did make a reappearance in the 1989 TV movies The Saint: The Brazilian Connection and The Saint: The Software Murders, played by David Ryall in both.

=== Radio ===
John Baddeley voiced Teal in the 1995 BBC Radio adaptations of The Saint Closes the Case, and The Saint Plays With Fire. 2. The Saint Closes the Case3. The Saint Plays With Fire
