= Featuring the Saint =

Collection of novellas by Leslie Charteris

- First edition
- Author: Leslie Charteris
- Language: English
- Series: The Saint
- Genre: Mystery
- Publisher: Hodder and Stoughton
- Publication date: 1931
- Publication place: United Kingdom
- Media type: Print (hardback & paperback)
- Preceded by: Knight Templar
- Followed by: Alias the Saint

Featuring the Saint is a collection of three mystery novellas by Leslie Charteris, first published in the United Kingdom in February 1931 by Hodder and Stoughton. This was the fifth book to feature the adventures of Simon Templar, alias "The Saint". It was the first novella collection to be published since Enter the Saint a year earlier. The three stories had previously been published in The Thriller magazine in the UK.

The first American publication of Featuring the Saint occurred in 1931 as part of the compilation Wanted for Murder, which also included the contents of the following book, Alias the Saint. One story from this collection, "The Man Who Could Not Die", was included in a 1950s American edition of Alias the Saint; a complete US edition of the original Featuring the Saint was first published in the early 1960s.

Later editions published in the 1960s (such as the TV tie-in edition by Fiction Book Company), included a new foreword by Charteris apologizing for the by-then "outdated" nature of the stories.

== Stories ==
The book consisted of the following stories:

1. The Logical Adventure: Templar pursues a famous aviator involved in an international drug-smuggling and flesh-peddling ring. A small portion of the story takes place in mainland Europe.
2. The Wonderful War: The Saint travels to the fictional Central American nation of Pasala where he seeks to avenge the murder of an oil prospector and spark a revolution. This was the first story to feature Templar's agent Archie Sheridan, and the first to take place exclusively outside the United Kingdom. Set in an exotic location, it could also be seen as a prototype for the many "travelogue"-style Saint adventures that would follow in future years.
3. The Man Who Could Not Die. Miles Hallin claims to be able to cheat death, but he puts this ability to the test when he kills one of Templar's friends as part of a mining scam.

== Publication history ==
The three stories were previously published under different titles in the magazine Thriller:

- "The Logical Adventure" - 24 May 1930 (as "Without Warning")
- "The Wonderful War" - 1 June 1929 (as "The Judgment of the Joker")
- "The Man Who Could Not Die" - 11 October 1930 (as "Treachery")

== Television adaptations ==
"The Wonderful War" was adapted as an episode of The Saint and first broadcast during the show's second season on 2 January 1964. The TV version of the story followed the basic plot of the original fairly closely, with the major change being the location of the story changing to a fictional Middle Eastern country, Sayeda, located between Kuwait and Iraq.

"The Man Who Could Not Die" was adapted by the same series for its fourth season and first aired on 5 August 1965.
