= John le Carré bibliography =

This is a list of works by or featuring David John Moore Cornwell, a British author better known by his pseudonym John le Carré. He wrote twenty-six novels in his career, one of which was published posthumously. He also wrote a memoir, several short stories, screenplays, and articles, and a book of le Carré's letters was also published posthumously.

Le Carré's son Nick Harkaway has continued the George Smiley series with the novel Karla's Choice.

This page also includes a list of film, television, and radio adaptations of le Carré's writing.

== Novels ==
Year	Title	Identifier	Highest NYT position reached	Number of weeks on NYT list	Notes
1961	Call for the Dead	OCLC 751303381	—	—	
1962	A Murder of Quality	OCLC 777015390	—	—	
1963	The Spy Who Came in from the Cold	OCLC 561198531	#1	56	number one for most of 1964
1965	The Looking Glass War	OCLC 752987890	#5	14–16	weeks uncertain due to NYT strike
1968	A Small Town in Germany	ISBN 0-143-12260-6	#2	28	
1971	The Naïve and Sentimental Lover	ISBN 0-143-11975-3	#10	2	
1974	Tinker Tailor Soldier Spy	ISBN 0-143-12093-X	#1	40	
1977	The Honourable Schoolboy	ISBN 0-143-11973-7	#3	33	
1979	Smiley's People	ISBN 0-340-99439-8	#1	28	
1983	The Little Drummer Girl	ISBN 0-143-11974-5	#1	34	
1986	A Perfect Spy	ISBN 0-143-11976-1	#1	22	
1989	The Russia House	ISBN 0-743-46466-4	#1	21	
1990	The Secret Pilgrim	ISBN 0-345-50442-9	#1	12	
1993	The Night Manager	ISBN 0-345-38576-4	#3	13	
1995	Our Game	ISBN 0-345-40000-3	#2	9	
1996	The Tailor of Panama	ISBN 0-345-42043-8	#7	7	
1999	Single & Single	ISBN 0-743-45806-0	#3	7	
2001	The Constant Gardener	ISBN 0-743-28720-7	#4	9	
2003	Absolute Friends	ISBN 0-670-04489-X	#3	9	
2006	The Mission Song	ISBN 0-340-92199-4	#3	3	
2008	A Most Wanted Man	ISBN 1-416-59609-7	#4	4	
2010	Our Kind of Traitor	ISBN 0-143-11972-9	#7	3	
2013	A Delicate Truth	ISBN 0-143-12531-1	#6	4	
2017	A Legacy of Spies	ISBN 0-7352-2511-7	#1	6	
2019	Agent Running in the Field	ISBN 1-9848-7887-5	#5	1	
2021	Silverview	ISBN 0-241-55006-8	#6	3	posthumous

Source: The New York Times Best Seller list Figures are for the Adult Hardcover Fiction lists, 1961 through 2021: highest position reached and total number of weeks on list (possibly nonconsecutive). A "—" indicates it did not make the list. Note that the Times list consisted of a Top 10 from 1963 through 1976, but a Top 15 or 16 in the covered years before and after.

=== George Smiley omnibus volumes ===
- The Incongruous Spy (1964), containing Call for the Dead and A Murder of Quality, OCLC 851437951
- The Quest for Karla (1982), containing Tinker Tailor Soldier Spy, The Honourable Schoolboy and Smiley's People ISBN 0-394-52848-4
  - Republished in 1995 as Smiley Versus Karla in the UK; and John Le Carré: Three Complete Novels in the U.S.

== Short stories ==
- "Dare I Weep, Dare I Mourn?" (1967), in Saturday Evening Post, 28 January 1967
- "What Ritual is Being Observed Tonight?" (1968), in Saturday Evening Post, 2 November 1968
- "The Writer and the Horse" (published in the US as "A Writer and A Gentleman") (1968), in The Savile Club Centenary Magazine and later in The Argosy and The Saturday Review (November 30, 1968)
- "The King Who Never Spoke" (2009), in Ox-Tales: Fire, 2 July 2009

== Non-fiction ==
- The Good Soldier (1991), collected in Granta 35: The Unbearable Peace
- The United States Has Gone Mad (2003), collected in Not One More Death (2006), ISBN 1-844-67116-X
- Afterword (2014), an essay on Kim Philby, published in A Spy Among Friends by Ben Macintyre
- The Pigeon Tunnel: Stories from My Life (2016), ISBN 978-0-241-97687-6 Appeared at #10 for one week on the New York Times Best Seller nonfiction list.
- A Private Spy: The Letters of John le Carré 1945–2020 (2022), ISBN 978-0241550090

== Film ==
=== Screenplays ===
- End of the Line (1970)
- Smiley's People (1982) with John Hopkins
- A Murder of Quality (1991)
- The Tailor of Panama (2001), with John Boorman and Andrew Davies

=== Executive producer ===
- The Tailor of Panama (2001)
- Tinker Tailor Soldier Spy (2011)
- A Most Wanted Man (2014)
- The Night Manager (2016)
- Our Kind of Traitor (2016)
- The Little Drummer Girl (2018)

=== Actor ===
- The Little Drummer Girl (1984), as David Cornwell
- Tinker Tailor Soldier Spy (2011), as John le Carré- as participant at the Christmas party.
- The Night Manager (2016), as David Cornwell – as the offended guest at a restaurant.
- Our Kind of Traitor (2016) – as a ticket seller at the museum.
- The Little Drummer Girl (2018)

== Adaptations ==
After many years of working with various producers who made film adaptations of his novels, two of Cornwell's sons, Simon and Stephen, founded the production company The Ink Factory in 2010. This was to produce adaptations of his works as well as other film productions. The Ink Factory has produced the films A Most Wanted Man and Our Kind of Traitor, and the TV series The Night Manager and The Little Drummer Girl.

=== Film ===
- The Spy Who Came in from the Cold (1965), directed by Martin Ritt, with Richard Burton as the protagonist, Alec Leamas
- The Deadly Affair (1967), an adaptation of Call for the Dead, directed by Sidney Lumet, with James Mason as Charles Dobbs (George Smiley in the novel)
- The Looking Glass War (1970), directed by Frank Pierson, with Anthony Hopkins as Avery, Christopher Jones as Leiser, and Sir Ralph Richardson as LeClerc
- The Little Drummer Girl (1984), directed by George Roy Hill, with Diane Keaton as Charlie
- The Russia House (1990), directed by Fred Schepisi, with Sean Connery as Barley Blair
- The Tailor of Panama (2001), directed by John Boorman, with Pierce Brosnan as Andy Osnard, a disgraced spy, and Geoffrey Rush as the emigre English tailor Harry Pendel
- The Constant Gardener (2005), directed by Fernando Meirelles, with Ralph Fiennes as Justin Quayle, set in the slums in Kibera and Loiyangalani, Kenya; the poverty so affected the film crew that they established the Constant Gardener Trust to provide basic education to those areas (John le Carré was a patron of the charity)
- Tinker Tailor Soldier Spy (2011), directed by Tomas Alfredson and starring Gary Oldman as George Smiley
- A Most Wanted Man (2014), directed by Anton Corbijn and starring Philip Seymour Hoffman
- Our Kind of Traitor (2016), directed by Susanna White and starring Ewan McGregor

=== Radio ===
- The Russia House (1994), BBC Radio 4, featuring Tom Baker as Barley Blair
- The Complete Smiley (2009–2010) BBC Radio 4, an eight-part radio-play series, based on the novels featuring George Smiley, commencing with Call for the Dead, broadcast on 23 May 2009, with Simon Russell Beale as George Smiley, and concluding with The Secret Pilgrim in June 2010
- A Delicate Truth (May 2013), BBC Radio 4's Book at Bedtime, recorded by Damian Lewis
- Abridged excerpts from The Pigeon Tunnel, broadcast as BBC Radio 4's Book of the Week, commencing on 12 September 2016

=== Television ===
- Tinker Tailor Soldier Spy (1979), BBC seven-part television series, with Alec Guinness as George Smiley
- Smiley's People (1982), BBC television series, with Alec Guinness as George Smiley
- A Perfect Spy (1987), BBC television series adaptation directed by Peter Smith, with Peter Egan as Magnus Pym and Ray McAnally as Rick
- A Murder of Quality (1991), Thames Television film adaptation directed by Gavin Millar, with Denholm Elliott as George Smiley and Joss Ackland as Terence Fielding
- The Night Manager (2016–present), BBC (United Kingdom), AMC (United States; series 1), and Amazon Prime Video (Worldwide (Note: Excluding the United Kingdom); series 2) series, adapted by screenwriter David Farr, and directed by Susanne Bier (series 1) and Georgi Banks-Davies (series 2), with Tom Hiddleston as Jonathan Pine and Hugh Laurie as Richard Onslow Roper
- The Little Drummer Girl (2018), BBC (United Kingdom) and AMC (United States) series, directed by Park Chan-wook, with Florence Pugh as Charlie Ross, Michael Shannon as Martin Kurtz, and Alexander Skarsgård as Gadi Becker.
- The Night Manager (2023), Disney+ Hotstar (India) series, created by Sandeep Modi, adapted by Shridhar Raghavan, Akshat Ghildial and Shantanu Srivastava, and directed by Modi and Priyanka Ghose, with Anil Kapoor as Shailendra 'Shelly' Rungta, Aditya Roy Kapur as Shantanu 'Shaan' Sengupta / Joaquim Sequeira / Abhimanyu Mathur and Sobhita Dhulipala as Kaveri 'K' Dixit.
- Legacy of Spies (TBA), BBC (United Kingdom) and MGM+ (United States) series, adapted by Stephen Cornwell and Clarissa Ingram, and directed by Michael Lennox and Claudia Llosa, with Matthew Macfadyen as George Smiley and Charlie Hunnam as Alec Leamas.
