= Paul Dehn =

British screenwriter, playwright, and intelligence officer (1912–1976)

- Born: Paul Edward Dehn; 5 November 1912; Manchester, England
- Died: 30 September 1976 (aged 63); London, England
- Education: Brasenose College, Oxford
- Years active: 1950–1974
- Partner: James Bernard
- Relatives: Olive Dehn (sister); David Markham (brother-in-law); Kika Markham (niece); Petra Markham (niece)
- Military career
- Allegiance: United Kingdom
- Branch: British Army
- Service years: 1939–1945
- Unit: Special Operations Executive
- Conflicts: World War II

Paul Edward Dehn (/ˈdeɪn/ DAYN; 5 November 1912 – 30 September 1976) was a British screenwriter, playwright, critic, and World War II intelligence officer.

He was known for writing the screenplays to Goldfinger (1964), the John le Carré adaptations The Spy Who Came in from the Cold (1965) and The Deadly Affair (1967), the Planet of the Apes films (1970–74), and the Sidney Lumet-directed adaptation of Murder on the Orient Express (1974).

He won an Academy Award for Best Story for Seven Days to Noon (1950), and the BAFTA Award for Best Original Screenplay for Orders to Kill (1958).

== Early life ==
Dehn was born in 1912 in Manchester, to Jewish parents of German descent. He had a younger sister, author Olive Dehn. He was educated at Shrewsbury School, and attended Brasenose College, Oxford. While at Oxford, he contributed film reviews to weekly undergraduate papers.

He began his writing career in 1936 as a film reviewer for several London newspapers. He was lead film critic for the News Chronicle until its closure in 1960 and then for the Daily Herald until 1963.

== World War II ==
During World War II, he was stationed at Camp X in Ontario, Canada. This was one of several training facilities operated by the British Special Operations Executive to train spies and special forces teams. He was the Political Warfare officer from 1942 to 1944 and held the rank of Major. Dehn took part in missions in France and Norway, and was for a time partnered with Kim Philby. According to John le Carré, Dehn was involved in assassination operations.

== Writing career ==
In 1949, Dehn began a collaboration with composer James Bernard. Dehn asked Bernard to collaborate with him on the original story for the Boulting Brothers film Seven Days to Noon (1950).

He narrated the 1951 documentary Waters of Time and later wrote plays, operettas and musicals for the stage. He wrote the lyrics for songs in two films, Moulin Rouge (1952) and The Innocents (1961).

Through the 1960s, Dehn concentrated on screenwriting for spy films, including Goldfinger (1964), The Spy Who Came in from the Cold (1965), and The Deadly Affair (1967). He was recommended to the latter two projects by source material author John le Carré himself, who said Dehn knew far more about the espionage world than himself. Le Carré said of Dehn that "[he had] a pretty startling experience of the spook world, but he was a very gentle guy, lovely to work with."

Dehn wrote the screenplay for Franco Zeffirelli's 1967 film of The Taming of the Shrew, starring Elizabeth Taylor and Richard Burton. The film was a significant box-office hit.

He later wrote the screenplays for the second, third, and fourth original Planet of the Apes movies and received the story-by credit on the fifth. He wrote the librettos for William Walton's opera The Bear and two operas by Lennox Berkeley, A Dinner Engagement and Castaway.

His last screenplay was for Sidney Lumet's all-star Murder on the Orient Express (1974), based on the Agatha Christie whodunit, for which he was nominated for an Academy Award for Best Adapted Screenplay.

Dehn resurrected or reinvented at least three genres given up for dead at the time; the British mystery, the Shakespeare adaptation, and the spy film.

== Personal life ==
Dehn was gay, and in a long-term relationship with his oft-collaborator James Bernard.

Through his sister Olive, Dehn was uncle to actresses Kika and Petra Markham, makeup artist Sonia Markham, and poet Jehane Markham.

=== Death ===
Suffering from lung cancer for the final years of his life, Dehn died on September 30, 1976 in Chelsea.

== Filmography ==
Year	Title	Director	Notes
1950	Seven Days to Noon	John Boulting Roy Boulting	Co-wrote story w/James Bernard
1952	Moulin Rouge	John Huston	Music lyricist
1955	I Am a Camera	Henry Cornelius	Music lyricist
1956	On Such a Night	Anthony Asquith	
1958	Orders to Kill	Anthony Asquith	Co-writer w/George St. George
1964	Goldfinger	Guy Hamilton	Co-writer w/Richard Maibaum
1965	The Spy Who Came in from the Cold	Martin Ritt	Co-writer w/Guy Trosper
1967	The Deadly Affair	Sidney Lumet	
1967	The Night of the Generals	Anatole Litvak	Co-writer w/Joseph Kessel and Gore Vidal
1967	The Taming of the Shrew	Franco Zeffirelli	Co-writer w/Zeffirelli and Suso Cecchi d'Amico
1970	Fragment of Fear	Richard C. Sarafian	
1970	Beneath the Planet of the Apes	Ted Post	
1971	Escape from the Planet of the Apes	Don Taylor	
1972	Conquest of the Planet of the Apes	J. Lee Thompson	
1973	Battle for the Planet of the Apes	J. Lee Thompson	Wrote story
1974	Murder on the Orient Express	Sidney Lumet	

=== Documentary works ===
Year	Title	Director	Notes
1951	Waters of Time	Basil Wright	Narrator, co-writer w/Wright & Bill Launder
1960	A Place for Gold	Basil Wright	

== Awards and nominations ==
Award	Year	Category	Nominated work	Result
Academy Award	1952	Best Story	Seven Days to Noon	Won
Academy Award	1975	Best Adapted Screenplay	Murder on the Orient Express	Nominated
BAFTA Award	1959	Best Original Screenplay	Orders to Kill	Won
BAFTA Award	1968	Best Adapted Screenplay	The Deadly Affair	Nominated
Edgar Award	1965	Best Foreign Film	Goldfinger	Nominated
Edgar Award	1966	Best Motion Picture Screenplay	The Spy Who Came in from the Cold	Won
Edgar Award	1977	Best Motion Picture Screenplay	Murder on the Orient Express	Nominated
Writers Guild of America	1966	Best Adapted Screenplay	The Spy Who Came in from the Cold	Nominated
Writers' Guild of Great Britain	1975	Best British Screenplay	Murder on the Orient Express	Won
