= Silverview =

2021 novel by John le Carré

- Author: John le Carré
- Language: English
- Publisher: Viking Books
- Publication date: 12 October 2021
- Publication place: United Kingdom
- Media type: Print (hardcover and paperback)
- Pages: 215
- ISBN: 978-0593490594
- Dewey Decimal: 823/.914 L456
- LC Class: PR6062.E33 L43 2021

Silverview is a novel by British writer John le Carré, published posthumously on 12 October 2021. The book was completed for publication by his son Nick Cornwell. In the afterword, he noted that the process was "more like retouching a painting than completing a novel." He also speculated that his father refrained from publishing it sooner because it “does something that no other le Carré novel ever has. It shows a service fragmented: filled with its own political factions, not always kind to those it should cherish … and ultimately not sure, any more, that it can justify itself.”

Silverview centres on a young bookseller, an enigmatic Polish immigrant, and a British agent hunting down a leak. At just over 200 pages, it is the shortest le Carré novel since A Murder of Quality in 1962.

In 2021, Penguin Audio released an audiobook version, read by Toby Jones.

== Plot ==
Julian Lawndsley has left a career in the financial sector in London to open a bookstore in a small seaside town in East Anglia. Soon after opening the shop, a Polish immigrant named Edward Avon comes in, not to buy books but to chat. He urges Lawndsley to open a section of the store in the basement called the Republic of Literature, which would offer only the classics.

Edward Avon is later revealed to be a retired agent for MI6 and a former communist. Avon claims to have known Lawndsley's father at school before he joined a cult. Lawndsley's father had a prolific sex life and ran up debts. As he continues to learn more about Avon's background, Lawndsley is fascinated by his different identities, and he wonders which are performances and which are real. He soon becomes entwined with the life of Avon's family: his wife Deborah – also a former top British intelligence agent – who is terminally ill, and his daughter Lily, a single mother.

In another narrative strand, Avon is being investigated by the secret service's head of domestic security, Stewart Proctor. Proctor is suspicious of anyone like Avon, an ex-Communist, who demonstrates an absolute commitment to anything and who is thus a grave security threat. Proctor goes looking for Avon, suspecting him of being the source of an intelligence leak, and drags Lawndsley into his mission in the process.

== Reception ==
The novel received generally favourable reviews from literary critics. The Guardian wrote that "the great spy novelist’s final full-length book is a precision-tooled cat and mouse chase from a bookshop in East Anglia to the old eastern bloc." The New York Times book review was generally positive about the novel but noted that it ends abruptly and feels incomplete. The reviews said that "if Silverview feels less than fully executed, its sense of moral ambivalence remains exquisitely calibrated."

Time magazine gave the novel a mixed review and also commented on its feeling unfinished. The review said that "Silverview also feels unfinished—not in its narrative, but in the bits in between major plot points...[it] is more a drinkable blended whiskey than the vintage single malt le Carré completists might have been hoping for". It also opined that his 2017 novel A Legacy of Spies was a more fitting swansong for his career.
