= Albert and Victoria =

- Cast of Albert and Victoria
- Genre: Sitcom
- Written by: Reuben Ship
- Starring: Alfred Marks; Zena Walker; Barbara Murray; Frances Bennett; Petra Markham; John Alkin
- Country of origin: United Kingdom
- Original language: English
- No. of series: 2
- No. of episodes: 12 + 1 short

Production
- Running time: 30 minutes
- Production company: Yorkshire Television

Original release
- Network: ITV
- Release: 13 June 1970 – 17 September 1971

Albert and Victoria is a British sitcom that aired on ITV from 13 June 1970 to 17 September 1971. Starring Alfred Marks, it was written by Reuben Ship. It was made for the ITV network by Yorkshire Television.

In Albert and Victoria, Marks plays Albert Hackett, a middle-class man in late 19th-century England. He and his wife Victoria have nine children, and he is used to getting his own way.

== Cast ==
Albert and Victoria saw a substantial change of cast between the two series, with new actors for the characters of Victoria, Emma and Maud. The replacement of Zena Walker as Victoria by Barbara Murray was intended to last for the entire second series; however, during filming, Murray had a miscarriage. She was then replaced by Frances Bennett for the final four episodes.

=== Series One ===
- Alfred Marks – Albert Hackett
- Zena Walker – Victoria Hackett
- John Alkin – George Hackett
- Petra Markham – Lydia Hackett
- Kika Markham – Emma Hackett
- Helen Cotterill – Maud

=== Series Two ===
- Alfred Marks – Albert Hackett
- Barbara Murray – Victoria Hackett (episodes 1 and 2)
- Frances Bennett – Victoria Hackett (episodes 3 to 6)
- John Alkin – George Hackett
- Petra Markham – Lydia Hackett
- Gay Hamilton – Emma Hackett
- Julia Sutton – Maud

== Plot ==
Albert Hackett is a middle-class man in late 19th-century Britain, who is used to getting the final word over his wife Victoria and their five children.

== Episodes ==
The first series of Albert and Victoria aired for six thirty-minute episodes on ITV from 13 June to 18 July 1970, airing on Saturday evenings at 6.45pm. On Christmas Day 1970, a short special aired as part of All-Star Comedy Carnival. A second series, also of six thirty-minute episodes, aired from 14 August to 17 September 1971 on Saturday evenings, mostly at 5.40pm. While all the episodes survived the wiping policy of the era, the 1970 Christmas short is lost and thought to have been destroyed.

=== Series 1 (1970) ===
No. overall	No. in series	Title	Written by	Original release date
1	1	"The Petticoat Rebels"	Reuben Ship	13 June 1970
2	2	"Secret of the Attic"	Reuben Ship	20 June 1970
3	3	"The Gothic Church"	Reuben Ship	27 June 1970
4	4	"Curse of an Aching Tooth"	Reuben Ship	4 July 1970
5	5	"Suspicion"	Reuben Ship	11 July 1970
6	6	"Lovers' Quarrel"	Reuben Ship	18 July 1970

=== Series 2 (1971) ===
No. overall	No. in series	Title	Written by	Original release date
7	1	"The Last Word"	Reuben Ship	13 August 1971
8	2	"The Birthday Present"	Reuben Ship	20 August 1971
9	3	"The Inheritance"	Reuben Ship	27 August 1971
10	4	"The Elopement"	Reuben Ship	3 September 1971
11	5	"The Old Suitor"	Reuben Ship	10 September 1971
12	6	"Rise, Sir Albert"	Reuben Ship	17 September 1971
