= The Pigeon Tunnel: Stories from My Life =

2016 memoir by John le Carré

- First edition
- Author: John le Carré
- Language: English
- Publisher: Viking Books
- Publication date: 6 September 2016
- Publication place: United Kingdom
- Media type: Print (hardcover and paperback)
- Pages: 310
- ISBN: 9780735220775
- Dewey Decimal: 823/.912 $a B $2 23
- LC Class: PR6062.E33 $b Z46 2016

The Pigeon Tunnel: Stories from My Life is a memoir by British spy novelist John le Carré released on September 6, 2016. It is the only feature length work of non-fiction in his bibliography. In the memoir, le Carré recounts stories reflecting on his time in British intelligence during the Cold War, research on his novels that took him around the globe (including an encounter with Yasser Arafat in Beirut in 1982 while researching The Little Drummer Girl), and his strained relationship with his father who influenced his semi-autobiographical novel A Perfect Spy.

== Reception ==
The book received positive reviews from critics. The Guardian wrote that le Carré "remains a magician of plot and counter-plot, a master storyteller". Writing for The New York Times, Walter Isaacson praised the book as "a delightful collection of charming and occasionally insightful tales". Isaacson also expressed hope that the book's climactic chapter, which focuses on his relationship with his father, be turned into a "profound John le Carré book."
