= The Spy Who Came in from the Cold =

1963 spy novel by John le Carré

- Cover for the Victor Gollancz first edition
- Author: John le Carré
- Language: English
- Series: George Smiley
- Genre: Spy novel
- Published: September 1963
- Publisher: Victor Gollancz
- Publication place: United Kingdom
- Media type: Print (hardback & paperback)
- Pages: 240 pages
- ISBN: 0-575-00149-6

The Spy Who Came in from the Cold is a 1963 Cold War spy novel by the British author John le Carré. It depicts Alec Leamas, a British intelligence officer, being sent to East Germany as a faux defector to sow disinformation about a powerful East German intelligence officer. As with le Carré's previous novels Call for the Dead and A Murder of Quality, the novel features the fictitious British intelligence organisation, "The Circus", and its agents George Smiley and Peter Guillam.

The Spy Who Came in from the Cold portrays Western espionage methods as morally inconsistent with Western democracy and values. The novel received critical acclaim at the time of its publication and became an international best-seller; it was selected as one of the 100 Best Novels by Time magazine in 2005.

In 1965, Martin Ritt directed a cinematic adaptation, with Richard Burton as Leamas. Characters and events from The Spy Who Came in from the Cold are revisited in A Legacy of Spies, le Carré's 2017 novel centering on an ageing Guillam.

== Background ==
The Spy Who Came in from the Cold occurs during the heightened tensions that characterised the late 1950s and early 1960s Cold War, when a Warsaw Pact–NATO war sparked in Germany seemed likely. The story begins and concludes in Berlin, about a year after the completion of the Berlin Wall and around the time when double-agent Heinz Felfe was exposed and tried.

Le Carré's debut novel, Call for the Dead, introduced the characters George Smiley and Hans-Dieter Mundt. In that story, Smiley investigates the suicide of Samuel Fennan. He quickly establishes a link between the East German Secret Service and the deceased, and learns that Mundt, an assassin, killed the man after a misunderstanding between Fennan and their controller, Dieter Frey. Mundt escaped from England shortly after, getting back into East Germany before Smiley and Guillam could catch him. The Spy Who Came in from the Cold picks up two years later, where Mundt has had a somewhat meteoric rise to become the head of the Abteilung, because of his success with counter-intelligence operations against British networks, as well as a member of the Presidium of the Socialist Unity Party.

Le Carré said that the inspiration for the character of Leamas came from a "Peter Finch-like figure in a raincoat" whom he remembered seeing pull out a wad of foreign currencies at London Airport, demanding a large Scotch; an "archetypal secret agent figure – exhausted, barely knows what country he's in, much-travelled, down on his luck."

In 1979, Dutch writer Willem Frederik Hermans claimed that The Spy Who Came in from the Cold plagiarised his novel The Darkroom of Damocles, which had been published a year earlier. In 1985, Le Carré agreed that The Darkroom of Damocles was one of his influences, though getting the name of both the book and the author wrong in saying that his influences included "some Dutch writer with a book called The Room of Damocles. His name is Verhulst or Van Hulst."

== Plot ==
During the Cold War, Alec Leamas, a former SOE operative who fought in the Netherlands and Norway, runs a sizeable East German intelligence ring through his posting as Station Head of Berlin Station. Hans-Dieter Mundt, a former low level Abteilung officer who murdered Samuel Fennan a few years prior, has risen to power in the counterintelligence section and systematically eradicates the network. Leamas attempts to save Karl Riemeck, his final undercover source and member of the praesidium of the Socialist Unity Party, but fails, witnessing his death as he attempts to cross into West Germany. With his network destroyed, Leamas returns to London and visits the Circus' elusive chief, Control, to sanction his return "from the cold" and retirement. Instead, Control requests he stay in play for one final operation; a simulated defection to East Germany to frame Mundt as a double agent. Control explains that Mundt's deputy, Jens Fiedler, suspects his superior may be a turncoat for western intelligence services and could tip the balance in favour of ousting Mundt from power. In exchange for his success, Leamas will retain anything he makes on the mission, a pension pot, and will receive official sanction to retire from the Service.

In order to attract the attention of East German intelligence, Control organises Leamas' demotion to the finance department. Leamas begins to show signs of alcoholism and is eventually dismissed for fraudulent activity with Circus accounts. Leamas is forced onto the dole, lives in a substandard flat, and eventually starts working in a run-down library around local CPGB secretary Liz Gold. Leamas and Gold gradually strike up a friendship and eventually become lovers. After a period of illness reveals the extent of Liz's feelings for him, Leamas confesses he will soon be forced to say goodbye and she must not look for him. A few days later, he says goodbye, and takes the "final plunge" into Control's plan, getting arrested for assault and sentenced to three months in prison. Before fully involving himself in the scheme, however, he forces Control to promise to keep Liz out of the Circus' plans.

Following his release, Leamas is approached by a recruiter who claims to know him from Berlin. He lets Leamas stay at his home, before introducing him to a contact who takes Leamas to the Netherlands on a forged passport. There, an Abteilung agent interrogates Leamas at a safe house before smuggling him into East Germany. Leamas is gradually exposed to more senior officials within the Abteilung, during which he drops hints about ongoing payments to a double agent. In Britain, Liz is suddenly visited by a-now-retired George Smiley, who tells her to come to him should she need anything, inquires about her relationship with Leamas, and pays off the outstanding rent on Leamas' flat.

After rigorous interrogations, Leamas is moved to an isolated property and held under guard, where he is finally introduced to Jens Fiedler. His days consist largely of extended interviewing about his previous Circus work while hiking alongside Fiedler or a guard. In their time together, both men end up regularly debating the philosophical distinctions between Leamas' pragmatism and Fiedler's idealism of life in the DDR. Through these debates, Leamas interprets Fiedler to be inherently concerned about the righteousness of his actions and their impacts on the country. In contrast, Mundt is portrayed by Fiedler as an opportunistic mercenary who abandoned the Nazis and 'became' a Communist out of self-preservation. As the pair get closer, Fiedler also conveys his fears about Mundt's long standing anti-semitism affecting him, a Jewish man. Near the end of Fiedler's interrogations, the power struggle in the Abteilung escalates when Mundt abruptly arrests Fiedler and Leamas. In the panic Leamas inadvertently kills an East German guard, and awakes in Mundt's facility, where Mundt interrogates and tortures both men. It is then revealed, however, that Fiedler had also submitted an arrest warrant for Mundt, leading the East German régime to intervene and convene a court. Fiedler and Mundt are both released, and then summoned to present their cases to a tribunal convened in camera. During the trial, Leamas further elaborates on previous mentions of undercover payments to a foreign agent in bank accounts which match locations that Mundt had travelled to, while Fiedler presents other evidence implicating Mundt to be a British agent.

While Leamas is away, Liz receives an invitation from the East Germans to participate in an exchange of party members with the British Communist Party. Surprisingly, she is summoned by Mundt's attorney as a witness and forced to testify at the tribunal. She then admits Smiley paid the apartment lease, and that Smiley offered help should she need it. She also confesses that Leamas made her promise not to look for him, and that he said goodbye immediately before he assaulted the grocer. Leamas, realising his cover has been blown, offers to tell them about the mission in exchange for Liz's freedom, but realises the true nature of the scheme during the course of the tribunal. Fiedler is then arrested at the tribunal's end.

Immediately after the trial, Mundt locates and then releases Leamas and Liz from jail, and gives them a car to get from their current location to the Berlin Wall. During the drive, Leamas explains the entire situation to a bemused Liz. Mundt is actually a British double agent, who reports to Smiley, who is actually undercover in the mission and pretending to be retired. Mundt was turned against the East Germans before he returned following the murder of Samuel Fennan a few years earlier, and the mission's true target was Fiedler, who was closing in on exposing Mundt as a double agent. On account of Leamas’ and Liz's intimate relationship, however, Mundt (and Smiley) were provided with the means of discrediting Leamas' ability to provide evidence to the tribunal, and as such discredit Fiedler. Liz, however, is shaken, and realises that her actions have enabled the Circus to protect their asset Mundt at the expense of the thoughtful and idealistic Fiedler. When asked what will become of Fiedler, Leamas replies that he will be shot.

Although disgusted, Liz overcomes this on account of her love for Leamas. The two drive to the Berlin Wall, and make a break for West Germany by ascending the wall and through a section of sabotaged barbed wire atop the wall. Leamas reaches the top, but as he reaches down to help Liz, she is shot and killed by one of Mundt's operatives. She falls back down, and as Smiley calls to Leamas from the other side of the wall, he hesitates, before eventually descending the wall on the East German side, where he is also shot and killed.

== Characters ==
- Alec Leamas: A British field agent in charge of East German espionage
- Hans-Dieter Mundt: Leader of the East German Secret Service, the Abteilung
- Jens Fiedler: East German spy, and Mundt's deputy
- Liz Gold: English librarian and member of the Communist Party
- Control: Head of the Circus
- George Smiley: British spy, supposedly retired
- Peter Guillam: British spy
- Karl Riemeck: East German bureaucrat turned British spy

== Cultural impact ==
At its publication during the Cold War, the moral presentation of The Spy Who Came in from the Cold rendered it a revolutionary espionage novel by showing the intelligence services of both the Eastern and Western nations as engaging in the same expedient amorality in the name of national security. Le Carré also presents his Western spy as morally burnt-out.

The espionage world of Alec Leamas portrays love as a three-dimensional emotion that can have disastrous consequences for those involved. Good does not always vanquish evil in Leamas' world, a defeatist attitude that was criticised in The Times.

According to Jon Stock, writing in The Daily Telegraph: "The plot of The Spy Who Came in from the Cold is assembled with more precision than a Swiss watch. The heartless way in which Alec Leamas is manipulated; Control's ruthless playing of Mundt and Fiedler; and of course the dramatic ending on the Berlin Wall, immortalised in the film starring Richard Burton. My favourite le Carré, it gets better with each re-read."

== Adaptations ==
In 1965, Martin Ritt directed the film adaptation, with Richard Burton as Leamas, Oskar Werner as Fiedler, and Claire Bloom as Nan Perry, a renaming of the character of Liz Gold.

In 1986, BBC Radio 4 broadcast a radio adaptation, with Colin Blakely as Leamas.

In 2016, Paramount Television and The Ink Factory – who produced television adaptations of le Carré's The Night Manager – announced that they were developing a limited series based on The Spy Who Came in from the Cold, with Simon Beaufoy as the writer. On 14 January 2017, AMC and the BBC joined with The Ink Factory for the series. This series was eventually announced in 2025 as an MGM+, BBC and The Ink Factory collaboration, to be entitled Legacy of Spies, drawing on material from both The Spy Who Came in from the Cold and another le Carré novel, A Legacy of Spies, starring Matthew Macfadyen as George Smiley and Charlie Hunnam as Alec Leamas.

In 2024, David Eldridge wrote a theatrical adaptation of the novel which played in the Minerva Theatre at Chichester Festival Theatre, running from 23 August to 21 September 2024. It starred Rory Keenan as Alec Leamas, Agnes O'Casey as Liz Gold and John Ramm as George Smiley, directed by Jeremy Herrin. In a mostly positive review for The Times Literary Supplement, theatre critic Jim Keaveney notes that the role of Smiley is significantly "recast" in Eldridge's version: "Smiley does not fulfil the peripheral role le Carré provided for him. Instead he is central to the intrigue." The play moved to the West End of London in 2025, where it is being performed at @sohoplace Theatre.

In 2026, the play toured the UK between March and August, with Ralf Little in the role of Leamas, starting at the Churchill Theatre, Bromley. In May 2026 the play was being performed at the Richmond Theatre.

== Related novels ==
A Legacy of Spies, le Carré's 2017 novel, recounts the backstory to The Spy Who Came in From the Cold within a modern-day frame story told from the point of view of Peter Guillam.

Karla's Choice, a 2024 le Carré continuation novel by Nick Harkaway, the son of le Carré, takes place not long after that of The Spy Who Came in from the Cold. Harkaway re-creates several of the original book's main characters, especially George Smiley, in the context of le Carré's later novels. Harkaway's book takes as one of its themes the various characters' recriminations over Leamas' death.

== Awards and nominations ==
The novel won a 1963 Gold Dagger award from the Crime Writers' Association for "Best Crime Novel". Two years later the US edition was awarded the Edgar Award from the Mystery Writers of America for "Best Mystery Novel". It was the first work to win the award for "Best Novel" from both mystery writing organisations. Screenwriters Paul Dehn and Guy Trosper, who adapted the book for the 1965 movie, received an Edgar the following year for "Best Motion Picture Screenplay" for an American movie.

In 1990, the Crime Writers' Association ranked the novel third in their list The Top 100 Crime Novels of All Time. Five years later in a similar list by Mystery Writers of America the novel was ranked sixth. Time magazine, while including The Spy Who Came in from the Cold in its top 100 novels list, stated that the novel was "a sad, sympathetic portrait of a man who has lived by lies and subterfuge for so long, he's forgotten how to tell the truth."

In 2005, the fiftieth anniversary of the Dagger Awards, The Spy Who Came in from the Cold was awarded the Dagger of Daggers, a one-time award given to the Golden Dagger winner regarded as the stand-out among all fifty winners over the history of the Crime Writers' Association.

The book also headed the Publishers Weekly's list of 15 top spy novels in 2006.
