= Jehane Markham =

British poet and dramatist (1949–2024)

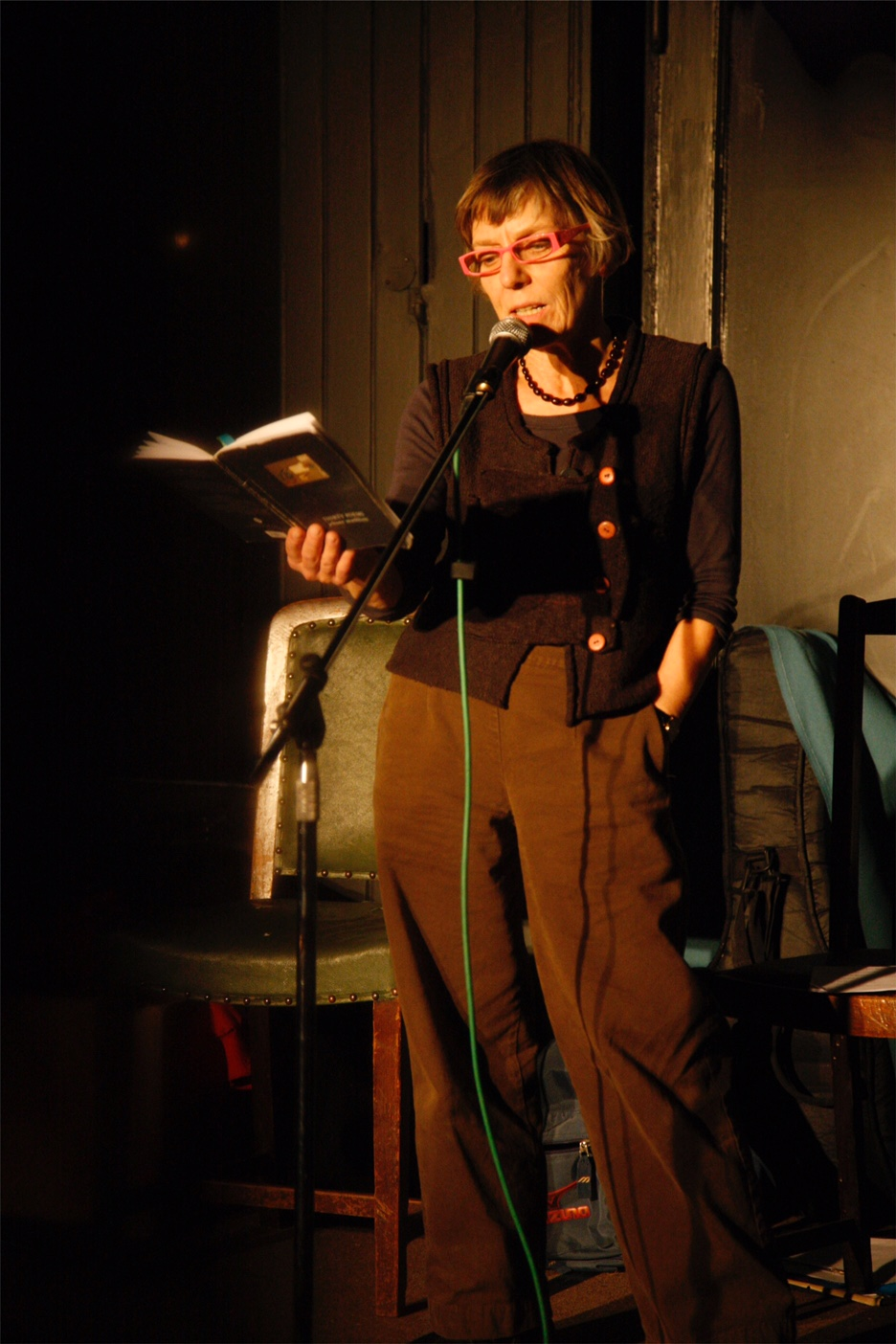
- Markham, April 2019
- Born: 1949 near Forest Row, East Sussex, England
- Died: 2024 (aged 74–75)
- Education: Central School of Arts and Crafts
- Occupations: Poet; librettist; dramatist
- Spouse: Roger Lloyd-Pack (m. 2000; died 2014)
- Children: 3
- Parents: David Markham; Olive Dehn
- Relatives: Petra Markham (sister); Kika Markham (sister)

Jehane Markham (1949–2024) was an English poet, librettist and dramatist.

== Early life ==
Markham was born in 1949 near the village of Forest Row, East Sussex and grew up on a smallholding on the edge of Ashdown Forest. Markham was the youngest of four sisters: Sonia Markham and actors Kika Markham and Petra Markham. Her parents were poet and children's author Olive Dehn and actor David Markham.

Until age eight, Markham was home-schooled. She then attended Burgess Hill boarding school in Hampstead, followed by Town and Country school in Swiss Cottage, and then Camden School for Girls. Markham then studied at the Central School of Arts and Crafts.

== Career ==
Markham began her career writing for radio, stage and television. Her work included adaptations of classics such as The Bell Jar by Sylvia Plath and Frost in May by Antonia White, as well as original plays, Thanksgiving, More Cherry Cake, and Nina, which became a Play for Today on the BBC.

Her plays with songs for fringe theatre included One White Day, The Birth of Pleasure and Hermes, working with Orlando Gough and Pete Letanka. She wrote the libretto for several fringe musicals. Her children's opera On the Rim of the World was composed for the Royal Opera House. Her last community opera was performed at Leiston House in 1997 - she wrote the book and lyrics for The Six Swans, a musical adaptation of two fairy tales by The Brothers Grimm, for the Wonderful Beast Theatre Company, and Hermes which was staged by the Rosemary Branch theatre in 2006.

As a poet, she published five collections, including Forty Poems (Dreams, Dances & Disappointments, 2022), and previously Thirty Poems (Rough Winds Productions, 2004), Twenty Poems (Rough Winds Productions, 1999), Ten Poems (Redstone Press, 1993), and The Captain's Death (Soul, 1974), as well as an audio collection My Mother Myself, with her mother the poet Olive Dehn (Rough Winds Productions, 2001).

Markham performed as part of the Jehane Markham Trio which she formed in 2004 and which performed for ten years, with pianist Robin Phillips and double bassist Graeme Howell, later replaced by double bassist Jonny Gee, and sometimes joined by cellist Natalie Rozario. They made two albums, The London Series and Vladivostok to Moscow and performed at poetry venues and arts festivals in London and across the country. She was poet in residence at Camden New Journal.

== Personal life ==
Markham married the actor Roger Lloyd-Pack in 2000. They had three sons, and six grandchildren. After Lloyd-Pack's death in 2014, she and her sons made a collaborative album of words and music, Sixteen Sunsets. Markham died in 2024 at age 75.

== Select publications ==
- The Captain's Death, Soul 1974 (ISBN 978-0-9503388-0-4)
- Ten Poems, Redstone Press 1993
- Twenty Poems, Rough Winds Productions 1999 (ISBN 978-0-9536583-1-2)
- Thirty Poems, Rough Winds Productions 2004 (ISBN 978-0-9536583-6-7)
- Forty Poems, Dances, Dreams and Disappointments 2022 (ISBN 978-1-3999-1878-7)

=== Audio ===
- My Mother Myself – audio tape of Jehane Markham and Olive Dehn reading their work, Rough Winds Productions, 2001 (ISBN 978-0-9536583-4-3)
