= The Looking Glass War =

1965 novel by John le Carré

- First-edition cover
- Author: John le Carré
- Series: George Smiley
- Genre: Spy novel
- Publisher: William Heinemann (UK)
- Publication date: June 1965
- Publication place: United Kingdom
- Media type: Print (hardcover and paperback)
- Pages: 246
- ISBN: 0-434-41200-7

The Looking Glass War is a 1965 spy novel by John le Carré. Written in response to the positive public reaction to his previous novel, The Spy Who Came in from the Cold, the book explores the unglamorous nature of espionage and the danger of nostalgia. The book tells the story of an incompetent British military intelligence agency known as The Department and its multiple botched attempts to verify a Communist defector's story of a Soviet missile buildup in East Germany. Some editions hyphenate "Looking Glass".

== Plot ==
During the early 1960s, a formerly renowned British military intelligence organisation known as "The Department" is foundering. Surviving on long past memories of its aerial reconnaissance missions during the Second World War, the organisation has been reduced to a skeleton crew consisting of Leclerc, a nostalgic former air commander who now serves as Director; John Avery, his 32-year-old aide who took the job after failing as a publisher; Wilf Taylor, a middle-aged man who views the job as his last chance at glory; and Adrian Haldane, a pompous intellectual in ailing health whose research on the Soviet Union and East Germany has been the sole reason for departmental funding from Whitehall. Languishing in bureaucratic battles and inconsequential desk work, Leclerc desperately desires the Department to regain its standing in the intelligence community, as well as to gain status against their now superior rival agency in “The Circus,” headed by chief "Control" and his second-in-command, George Smiley.

The Department gets its wish when a defector claims there is a build-up of Soviet missiles in the fictional town of Kalkstadt in East Germany, near Lübeck in West Germany. With the Cuban Missile Crisis in mind, they bribe a commercial pilot to stray off course to photograph the site in hope of verification. Taylor is dispatched to Finland to collect the film, but is then killed in a hit-and-run incident, which Leclerc interprets as an attempt to recapture the film by the Stasi. Avery is sent to recover Taylor's body, but his and Taylor's poorly-prepared legends fall apart under scrutiny. Avery does not recover the film, but Leclerc describes his mission as a success.

Despite the poor quality of their information, and their lack of any recent field action, Leclerc persuades the Minister to allow them to send an agent over the Inner German Border into East Germany. Fearing the Circus will take over the operation, the Department presents the operation as a training exercise in order to obtain a radio transmitter from Smiley. Control permits Smiley to provide only a long-obsolete transmitter. The Department then tracks down one of its old agents, a middle-aged naturalised Pole called Fred Leiser. Now a mechanic, Leiser has been out of the game a long time and knows little about the current circumstances of the intelligence community. Haldane and Avery lie to him and tell him the Department is still the dominant espionage unit and is operating at the size it was at its wartime peak. Avery believes that if Leiser's operation is successful, he will finally have accomplished something in his life that he can be proud of, while Leiser, possibly motivated by hatred of Germans, feels the operation is his chance to relive his wartime glory.

To train Leiser, the Department leases a house in north Oxford. Leiser is restricted to a precise daily training routine, and is allowed specific recreational activities on the condition he is accompanied by one of the handlers on the training crew. Leiser struggles on the training course. He is repeatedly beaten during his combat sparring, while Avery helps him to cheat during their Morse code training. Leiser begins to improve, and is able to pass all of his field readiness evaluations, including sending Morse code messages while changing frequencies every two minutes to avoid detection, which he had previously struggled with.

The Department leases a farmhouse near the East German border, which is furnished with NAAFI equipment. Leiser is taken on a driving tour where he is shown his entry point into East Germany. Before the crossing, Leiser is informed he cannot take a firearm, causing him to panic. During the border crossing, Leiser again panics and kills a young East German guard, which is publicised in East German media. Leiser steals a motorcycle and meets a young German girl in a nearby town. In exchange for information and use of her flat to transmit, Leiser agrees to give her sexual companionship. During his first transmission, Leiser forgets to change frequencies while transmitting. He spends six minutes on the same frequency slowly transmitting, instead of the maximum of two-and-a-half. This alerts the East Germans, who triangulate his position.

News of the situation reaches Smiley and Control, and their conversation implies Leiser's failure may have been engineered by Control.

Smiley arrives at the farmhouse with news of Leiser's murder of the border guard. The British government intends to deny all knowledge of Leiser. Smiley explains that Leiser's ineptitude, combined with his old equipment, will make it easier for him to say he is not a spy. Leclerc and Haldane are tempted further by an extension of the Department's research section at the Circus with more funding, while only Avery weeps bitterly about the mission's failure.

As the Department abandon the farmhouse, the Vopo apprehend Leiser in the girl's flat.

== Characters ==
- Leclerc: Director of the "Department", who can't let go of his glory days running successful aerial operations during World War II.
- Adrian Haldane: Veteran intelligence officer for the Department, who has served since World War II. Assigned to run the operation and handle Leiser's training and infiltration into East Germany. Jaded and in ill health.
- John Avery: 32-year-old aide to Leclerc, personally assigned by Leclerc to assist Haldane in training Leiser.
- Fred Leiser: naturalised Pole who served as a recruited agent for the Department during World War II; has forgotten or is out of practice in nearly all his clandestine skills.
- Jack Johnson: Veteran wireless operator for the Department, assigned to refresh Leiser's wireless skills on an obsolete, World War II-vintage radio set.
- George Smiley: Intelligence officer and envoy from the Circus.
- Control: Director ("operational control") of the Circus.

== Background and reception ==
According to le Carré in a foreword written for the 2013 Penguin Publishing reissue, the book was written as a direct response to the public reaction to his previous novel, The Spy Who Came in from the Cold. While le Carré had intended that novel as a deconstruction of the mythos that had sprung up around MI6 in the post-war era, he was disturbed that most readers in the United Kingdom regarded it as a romanticisation of spy life and saw its protagonist, Alec Leamas, as a tragic hero. According to le Carré, it was largely American audiences who understood that the book was meant to convey the futility of spy work. Still wanting to convey the same message, le Carré wrote The Looking Glass War as an explicit satire about a spy operation that was completely futile and pointless and the failure of which could not be considered a tragedy. He further sought to examine British nostalgia for the "glory days" of World War II, and how an ongoing fascination with Britain's victory in the conflict informed contemporary attitudes towards espionage. In doing so, he also culled details from his own time as an MI5 and MI6 agent, calling the book – along with The Secret Pilgrim – one of the most accurate reflections of his own experiences.

The book received a mixed-to-negative critical response, which le Carré credits to readers being upset that the book presented blatantly incompetent and largely unsympathetic characters. Writing in 2013, le Carré said that his "readers hated me for it", which he attributes to the public fascination and respect for spies: "Never mind how many times they trip over their cloaks and leave their daggers on the train to Tonbridge, the spies can do no wrong."

Although le Carré was upset with his fellow countrymen's response to the book, he was pleased that some American readers – including members of the intelligence community – appreciated the book as a satire.

== Adaptations ==
A film of the novel was released in 1969, starring Christopher Jones as Leiser, Ralph Richardson as LeClerc (sic), and Anthony Hopkins as Avery. It was directed by Frank Pierson.

As part of a series of dramatisation of Le Carré's work, the "Complete Smiley" series, BBC Radio produced a radio play of The Looking Glass War in 2009. Broadcast on BBC Radio 4, it starred Ian McDiarmid as Leclerc, Piotr Baumann as Leiser, Patrick Kennedy as Avery, and Simon Russell Beale as George Smiley. As with other plays in this series it is now available as a CD set as ISBN 978-1-4084-0086-9.

== Release details ==
- 1965, UK, William Heinemann ISBN 0-434-41200-7, Pub date ? June 1965, Hardback
- 1965, USA, Putnam Pub. Group ISBN 0-698-10218-5, Pub date ? June 1965, Hardback
- 1965, USA, Coward-McCann, Inc., New York, Book Club Edition, Hardback
- 1966, UK, Pan, ISBN 0-330-20210-3, London, Paperwork
- 1985, UK, G. K. Hall & Co. ISBN 0-8161-4040-5, Pub date ? April 1986, Hardback (Large Print)
- 1991, UK, Hodder & Stoughton Ltd ISBN 0-340-55813-X, Pub date 21 November 1991, Hardback
- 1991, UK, Hodder & Stoughton (Coronet) ISBN 0-340-55446-0, Pub date 21 November 1991, Paperback
- 1992, USA, Ballantine Books ISBN 0-345-37736-2, Pub date ? March 1992, Paperback
- 1999, UK, Hodder & Stoughton ISBN 1-84032-108-3, Pub date 22 February 1999, Audio cassette (read by John le Carré)
