= Roger Lloyd-Pack =

English actor (1944–2014)

Roger Lloyd Pack
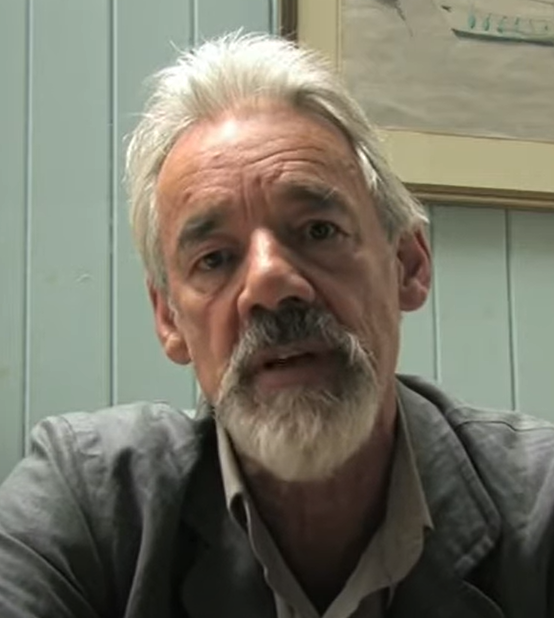
- Lloyd Pack in 2011
- Born: Roger Anthony Pack; 8 February 1944; Islington, London, England
- Died: 16 January 2014 (aged 69); Kentish Town, London, England
- Resting place: Highgate Cemetery
- Occupation: Actor
- Years active: 1960–2014
- Spouses: Sheila Ball (m. 1967; div. 1972) Jehane Markham (m. 2000)
- Children: 4, including Emily Lloyd
- Parent: Charles Lloyd Pack (father)
- Relatives: David Markham (father-in-law); Olive Dehn (mother-in-law)

Roger Anthony Lloyd Pack (8 February 1944 – 16 January 2014) was a British actor. He is best known for playing Trigger in Only Fools and Horses from 1981 to 2003, and Owen Newitt in The Vicar of Dibley from 1994 to 2007. He later starred as Tom in The Old Guys with Clive Swift. He is also well known for the role of Bartemius Crouch in Harry Potter and the Goblet of Fire and for his appearances in Doctor Who as John Lumic in the episodes "Rise of the Cybermen" and "The Age of Steel".

== Early life ==
Lloyd Pack was born on 8 February 1944 in Islington, London, the son of actor Charles Lloyd Pack (1902–1983) and Ulrike Elisabeth (née Pulay, 1921–2000), an Austrian Jewish refugee who worked as a travel agent. His uncle was George Pulay, one of the secret listeners to German POW in Trent Park during World War II.

Lloyd Pack attended Bedales School near Petersfield in Hampshire, where he achieved A Level passes in English, French and Latin. He subsequently trained at the Royal Academy of Dramatic Art (RADA), graduating in 1965 with an Acting Diploma.

== Career ==
Lloyd Pack began his acting career at Northampton's Royal Theatre, making his stage debut in the Thomas Dekker play The Shoemaker's Holiday.

He featured on an episode of The Professionals ("Long Shot", 1978) as a terrorist hitman.

=== Only Fools and Horses ===
On British television, he was best known for portraying Trigger, Del Boy's slow-witted "village idiot" friend in the BBC sitcom Only Fools and Horses, from 1981 to 2003.

Lloyd Pack was cast by pure chance: an Only Fools and Horses executive producer, Ray Butt, hired him to portray the character Trigger after seeing him in a stage play, and had only attended that play to observe potential Del Boy actor Billy Murray.

=== Later career ===
He was also known for his role in The Vicar of Dibley as Owen Newitt and to international audiences for his performance as Bartemius Crouch Sr. in the film Harry Potter and the Goblet of Fire. In addition, he had a semi-regular role during the 1990s as the plumber Jake "The Klingon" Klinger, Ben Porter's arch-rival, in the sitcom 2point4 Children.

In 2005, he appeared in the second series of ITV's Doc Martin as a farmer who held a grudge against Dr Ellingham for what he believed was the malpractice-related death of his wife. In 2006, he played John Lumic and provided the voice of the Cyber-Controller in two episodes of Doctor Who, "Rise of the Cybermen" and "The Age of Steel", opposite David Tennant, who had played his son in the same Harry Potter film. Lloyd Pack's final TV appearance was in Law & Order: UK as Alex Greene.

He voiced the pre-match build-up montage video shown ahead of all Tottenham Hotspur's home matches, which is still played today.

In June 2008, he appeared as a guest on the BBC's The Politics Show, arguing the case for better-integrated public transport (specifically railways), and, in January 2012, he and fellow actor Sarah Parish supported a campaign to raise £1 million for The Bridge School in Islington.

In 2012, he portrayed the Duke of Buckingham in the play Richard III, and in 2013, portrayed Sir Andrew Aguecheek in Twelfth Night, both at the Apollo Theatre, London.

== Personal life ==
Lloyd Pack was married twice: first to Sheila Ball, from whom he was divorced in 1972, and secondly to the poet and dramatist Jehane Markham (daughter of David Markham), whom he married in 2000. He had a daughter, actress Emily Lloyd, and three sons. He later lived in Kentish Town, north London, and also had a home near Fakenham in Norfolk.

Lloyd Pack was a supporter of Tottenham Hotspur.

He was an honorary patron of the London children's charity Scene & Heard.

In a 2008 interview, when asked what profession he would have chosen aside from acting, Lloyd Pack said: "Psychiatrist or a psychoanalyst or something in the psycho world because I've always been interested in that... or I might have been a photographer... I also would have loved to have been a musician." In that same interview, he listed his favourite directors as Peter Gill, Harold Pinter, Richard Eyre, Thea Sharrock and Tina Packer, and listed actor Paul Scofield as both a favourite and influence.

=== Political views ===
Lloyd Pack supported the Labour Party and campaigned for Ken Livingstone in the 2012 London mayoral election. However, in 2013, he signed a letter in The Guardian stating he had withdrawn his support from the Labour Party, in favour of a new party of the left, Left Unity.

== Death and tributes ==
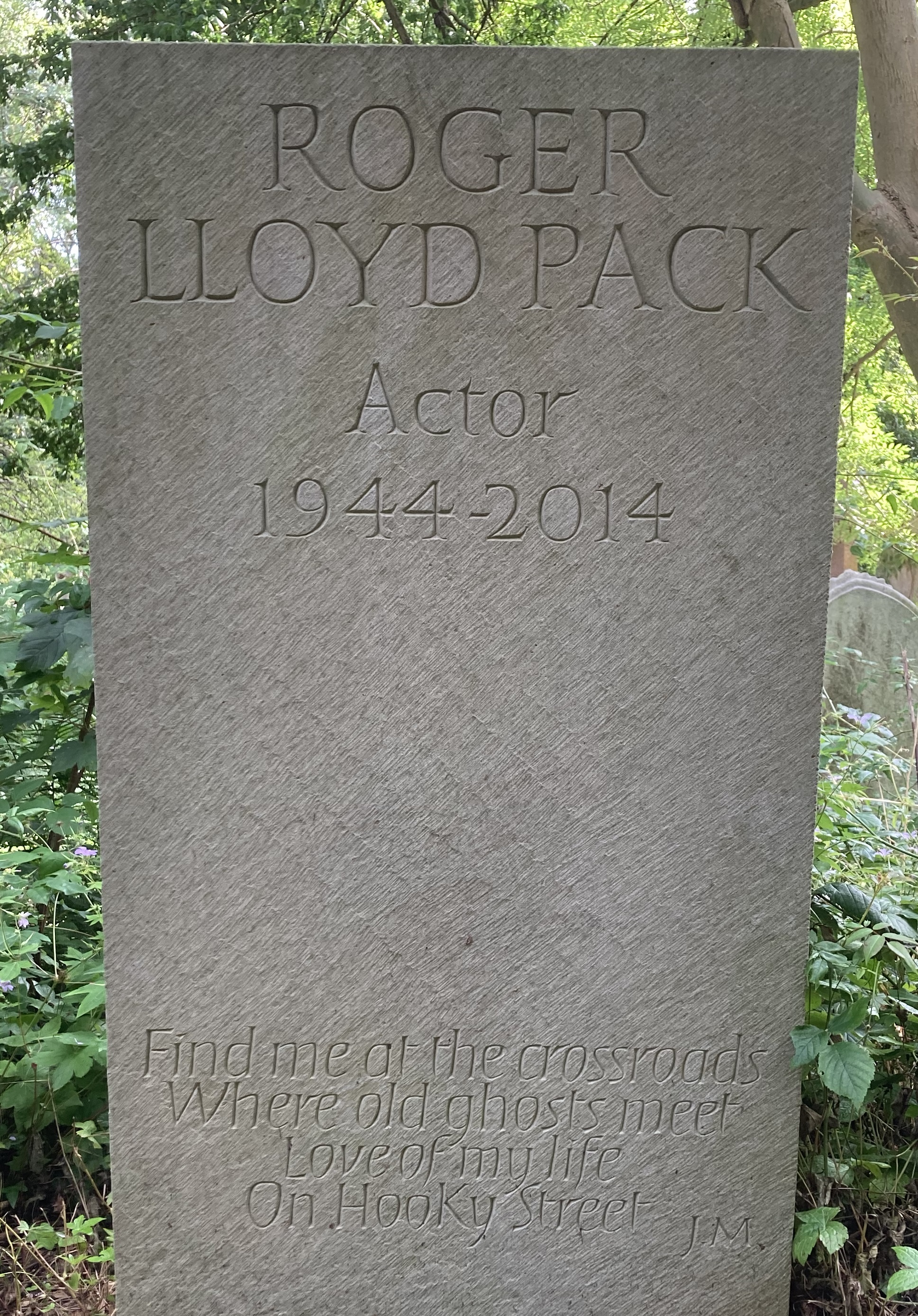
Grave of Roger Lloyd Pack in Highgate Cemetery

Lloyd Pack died of pancreatic cancer at his home in Kentish Town, aged 69, on 16 January 2014. His funeral was held at the church of St. Paul's, Covent Garden. It was attended by former fellow cast members Sir David Jason, Nicholas Lyndhurst, John Challis and Sue Holderness. He was buried at Highgate Cemetery East.

Nigel Havers, Stephen Rea, Miranda Richardson, Alison Steadman, Kathy Burke and Joely Richardson paid tribute to him.

In March that year, the Sport Relief special of Only Fools and Horses was dedicated to the memory of both Lloyd Pack and John Sullivan. Similarly, the final episode of the lockdown edition of The Vicar of Dibley ended with a tribute just before the closing credits reading, "In loving memory of Liz, John, Emma and Roger", paying tribute to him and three other late Dibley cast members, (Liz Smith, John Bluthal and Emma Chambers). The third episode of series 8 of Law & Order: UK, which Lloyd Pack appeared in, aired two months after his death and similarly ended with a tribute title card.

In 2025, Lloyd Pack appeared on a British postage stamp issued as part of a special set by Royal Mail, which commemorated the series The Vicar of Dibley.

== Filmography ==
=== Film ===
Year	Title	Role	Notes
1968	The Magus	Young Conchis	
1968	Secret Ceremony	Cleaner	Uncredited
1969	The Virgin Soldiers	Bandmaster	Uncredited
1969	Hamlet	Reynaldo	
1970	Figures in a Landscape	Soldier	
1971	The Go-Between	Charles	
1971	Fright	Constable	
1971	Fiddler On The Roof	Sexton	
1974	Confessions of a Sex Maniac	Henry Milligan	aka The Man Who Couldn't Get Enough
1979	Meetings with Remarkable Men	Pavlov	
1979	Cuba	Nunez	
1984	1984	Waiter	
1987	Prick Up Your Ears	Actor 2	
1989	The Cook, the Thief, His Wife & Her Lover	Geoff	
1990	Wilt	Dr. Pittman	
1991	American Friends	Dr. Butler	
1991	The Object of Beauty	Frankie	
1993	The Trial	Stairman	
1993	U.F.O.	Solo	
1994	Princess Caraboo	Magistrate Haythorne	
1994	Interview with the Vampire	Piano Teacher	
1995	The Young Poisoner's Handbook	Fred	
1996	Hollow Reed	Hannah's Lawyer	
1997	Van Gogh's Ear	Michael Ash	Short film
1997	Preaching to the Perverted	Mr. Cutts Watson	
1998	The Avengers	Professor	Uncredited
2004	Vanity Fair	Francis Sharp	
2005	Harry Potter and the Goblet of Fire	Bartemius Crouch	
2006	The Living and the Dead	Donald Brocklebank	
2010	Made in Dagenham	George	
2011	Tinker Tailor Soldier Spy	Mendel	
2011	In Love with Alma Cogan	Norman	
2013	Twelfth Night	Sir Andrew Aguecheek	(The Globe on Screen)

=== Television ===
Year	Title	Role	Notes
1967	The Prisoner	Villager	Episode: "It's Your Funeral", uncredited
1968	Virgin of the Secret Service	Cuthbert Blake	Episode: "Entente Cordiale"
1968	Crime Buster	Laboratory Analyst	Episode: "The Third Thief"
1970	The Roads to Freedom	Bobby	Episode: #1.2
1972	Jason King	Radio Operator	Episode: "A Kiss for a Beautiful Killer"
1972	Spyder's Web	Albert Mason	11 episodes
1972–1973	The Protectors	Paparazzo/Russi	2 episodes
1973	Special Branch	Paul	Episode: "Red Herring"
1974	Within These Walls	Dr. Osmonde	Episode: "The Group"
1974	Crown Court	Dr. Patrick Attwater	Episode: "The Alb of St. Honoratus: Part 1"
1975	Churchill's People	Thug	Episode: "The Fine Art of Bubble Blowing"
1975	Play for Today	Sidney Bagley	Episode: "Brassneck"
1975	Softly, Softly: Task Force	Martin Webb	Episode: "Homicide"
1975	The Naked Civil Servant	Bermondsey Liz	Television film
1976	Dixon of Dock Green	Ron Fielding	Episode: "Everybody's Business"
1976	Survivors	Wally	2 episodes
1977	The Professionals	Ramos the terrorist	Episode: "Long Shot"
1978	Will Shakespeare	Jack Heminge	6 episodes
1979	BBC Television Shakespeare	2nd Gentleman	Episode: "The Famous History of the Life of King Henry the Eight"
1980	Bloody Kids	Hospital Doctor	Television film
1980	Turtle's Progress	Corsican	Episode: #2.2
1981	Chronicle	Chambers	Episode: "The Crime of Captain Colthurst"
1981	Private Schulz	Melvin	Episode: #1.6
1981–1996, 2001–2003	Only Fools and Horses	Trigger	39 episodes
1983	Video Stars	Bus Enthusiast	Television film
1983	Bouncing Back	Unknown	Television film
1984	Miracles Take Longer	Terry Noble	2 episodes
1984	I Thought You'd Gone	PC Balmforth	Episode: #1.7
1985	Moving	Jimmy Ryan	6 episodes
1985–1993	Screen Two	Selser; David Power; Derek	3 episodes
1985	Summer Season	Victor	Episode: "One for the Road"
1986	Comrade Dad	Black market stallholder	Episode: "Londongrad 1999"
1986	The Deliberate Death of a Polish Priest	Lt. Chmielewski	Television film
1987	Inspector Morse	Donald Martin	Episode: "The Silent World of Nicholas Quinn"
1987	The Finding	Fowles	Television film
1988	The Modern World: Ten Great Writers	Rosmer	Episode: "Henrik Isben"
1988	Room at the Bottom	Stranger	Episode: "Withcraft"
1988	Bad Boyes	Boggs	Episode: "The Holiday"
1989	Theatre Night	Glendenning	Episode: "The Contractor"
1989	The Stone Age	Herb	Television film
1989	Made in Spain	Den	Television film
1990	Mr. Bean	Waiter	Episode: "The Return of Mr. Bean"
1990	Byker Grove	Beckett	5 episodes
1990	Zorro	Carrillo	Episode: "The Marked Man"
1991	The Chief	Kenneth Rudyard	2 episodes
1991–2002	The Bill	Mick Mortimer/Arnie	7 episodes
1991	Selling Hitler	David Irving	2 episodes
1991	Stay Lucky	Eddie Vernon	Episode: "The Food of Love"
1991	The Gravy Train Goes East	Ferenc Plitplov	4 episodes
1991	Boon	Ray Watts	Episode: "Cab Rank Cowboys"
1992	Archer's Goon	Quentin Sykes	6 episodes
1992	Screen One	Gordon	Episode: "Trust Me"
1992	Party Time	Fred	Television film
1993	Anna Lee: Headcase	Desk clerk	Television film
1993	Lovejoy	Smallman-Smith	Episode: "Who Is the Fairest of Them All?"
1993–1995	Inside Victor Lewis-Smith	Policeman	8 episodes
1993–1995	2point4 Children	Jake Klinger	3 episodes
1993–1996	Health and Efficiency	Rex Regis	12 episodes
1994	Citizen Locke	Captain	Television film
1994	Dandelion Dead	Phillips	2 episodes
1994–2007	The Vicar of Dibley	Owen Newitt	20 episodes
1995	Blood and Peaches	Tour guide	Television film
1995	The Perfect Match	Tom	Television film
1996–1997	Paul Merton in Galton & Simpson's...	Police constable Sergeant	2 episodes
1996	Murder Most Horrid	Frank Foster	Episode: "Confess"
1996	Zig and Zag's Dirty Deeds	Clutch	Episode: "This Party Sucks"
1996	Heartbeat	Reggie Rawlins	Episode: "Catch Us If You Can"
1997	The Missing Postman	Ken Thompson	Television film
1997–1998	Knight School	Sir Baldwin De'Ath	3 episodes
1997	The History of Tom Jones, a Foundling	Anderson	2 episodes
1997	Noel's House Party	Builder	Episode: #7.9
1998	The Vanishing Man	Marvin	Episode: "Nothing Up My Sleeve"
1999	Kavanagh QC	Alex Watkins	Episode: "Time of Need"
1999	Oliver Twist	Mr Sowerberry	2 episodes
2000	Longitude	Capt. Man	Television film, uncredited
2000	Fish	Jim Lumsden	Episode: "Dancing with the Devil"
2001	Murder Rooms: The Dark Beginnings of Sherlock Holmes	Dr. Ibbotson	Episode: "The Photographer's Chair"
2002	Born and Bred	Norman Pendleton	Episode: "The Best Man"
2002	Dalziel and Pascoe	Bishop Halliwell	Episode: "Sins of the Fathers"
2003	Margery & Gladys	D.I. Woolley	Television film
2004	Where the Heart Is	Don Nicholls	Episode: "Bowl of Cherries"
2005	Doc Martin	Phil Pratt	Episode: "Always on my Mind"
2005	Agatha Christie's Poirot	Inspector Caux	Episode: "The Mystery of the Blue Train"
2006	Doctor Who	John Lumic	Episode: "Rise of the Cybermen/The Age of Steel"
2006	What We Did on Our Holiday	Jim Taylor	Television film
2007	The History of My Polly	Mr. Johnson	Television film
2008	New Tricks	Danny Jones	Episode: "Loyalties and Royalties"
2009–2010	The Old Guys	Tom Finnan	12 episodes
2009	The Catherine Tate Show	Ghost of Christmas Future	Episode: "Nan's Christmas Carol"
2010	Arena	Various Characters	Episode: "Harold Pinter: A Celebration"
2010	Survivors	Billy Stringer	2 episodes
2011	Hustle	Clive Ban	Episode: "Clearance From A Deal"
2012	The Borgias	Friar	6 episodes
2012	Inspector George Gently	Hector Blackstone	Episode: "Gently with Class"
2014	Law & Order: UK	Alex Greene	Episode: "I Predict a Riot"

=== Stage ===
- 1984 Wild Honey by Anton Chekhov, playing Osip (Best Supporting Actor, BTA Awards 1984)
- 1984 One for the Road by Harold Pinter (Victor) world premiere at the Lyric Hammersmith
- 1986 Kafka's Dick by Alan Bennett, playing Kafka (world premiere at The Royal Court)
- 1985 The Deliberate Death of a Polish Priest by Ronald Harwood (Lt. Chmielewski) premiere at Almeida Theatre
- 1989 A Flea in Her Ear (playing Étienne Plucheux) by Georges Feydeau translated by John Mortimer, directed by Richard Jones, Old Vic
- 1995 Tartuffe by Moliere playing the title role at the Royal Exchange, Manchester
- 1999 'Art' at the Theatre Royal, Bath and in 2000 at the Bristol Hippodrome
- 2005 Blue/Orange by Joe Penhall, as Robert at the Sheffield Crucible
- 2006 Dick Whittington, pantomime by Mark Ravenhill at the Barbican Centre, as Sarah the cook
- 2007 Dealer's Choice by Patrick Marber, playing the part of Ash, at the Menier Chocolate Factory, directed by Samuel West
- 2007 The Last Laugh, by Kōki Mitani (English version of Warai no Daigaku), playing The Censor, Japan.
- 2012 The Trojan Women, Caroline Bird's adaptation of the tragedy by Euripides, playing Poseidon, at the Gate Theatre, Notting Hill, London
- 2012 Richard III by William Shakespeare, playing Duke of Buckingham at the Globe Theatre, South Bank, London
- 2013 Twelfth Night by William Shakespeare playing Sir Andrew Aguecheek
