= Olive Dehn =

Poet and children's writer

- Born: Olive Marie Dehn; 29 September 1914; Didsbury, Lancashire, England
- Died: 21 March 2007 (aged 92); Coleman's Hatch, East Sussex, England
- Citizenship: United Kingdom
- Occupations: Children's writer; Farmer; Anarchist; Poet
- Years active: 1932–2006
- Spouse: David Markham (m. 1937; died 1983)
- Children: 4, including Kika, Petra and Jehane Markham
- Relatives: Paul Dehn (brother); Roger Lloyd-Pack (son-in-law); Corin Redgrave (son-in-law)

Olive Marie Dehn (29 September 1914 – 21 March 2007) was an English children's writer, anarchist, farmer and poet who was active from the 1930s to the 2000s. She began her writing career with a satirical poem in German, and wrote stories for the BBC Radio programme Children's Hour. Dehn moved into children's literature and into farming at her home in the Ashdown Forest. In 1960, she became a member of the Committee of 100 to take non-violent direct action against nuclear power, and successfully campaigned with her husband David Markham for the release of the Soviet dissident Vladimir Bukovsky. The Olive Dehn Papers on her life and career were deposited at the Seven Stories in Newcastle.

== Early life ==
Dehn was born at Belfield Road, Didsbury, near Manchester, England, on 29 September 1914. She was the only daughter and middle child of the cotton merchant Frederick Edward Dehn, a first-generation businessman, and his wife, Helen Dehn, née Susman, a German-Jew. Dehn's elder brother was the film critic and screenwriter Paul Dehn. At the age of four, she said she liked corners when instructed to stand in one and told stories to her younger brother. Dehn was taught at a girls' school in Seaford, East Sussex, from which she had an unhappy experience. Because education was believed to be useless to girls, she was sent to live with her aunt and uncle in Germany to be taught cooking.

== Career ==
By age 18, Dehn authored a satirical poem, Goebelchen (English: A Half Aryan Ballad), describing Nazism as seen by a Dachshund. This was the catalyst of her arrest by the Gestapo and subsequent deportation from Germany under armed guard one year later, after the poem was intercepted at the German border en route to Punch in London. Back in England, Dehn wrote stories for the BBC Radio programme Children's Hour, where she used her high-pitched voice to portray boy characters. In 1935, she signed a deal to publish her works with Basil Blackwell in a series based first featured in the Joy Street annuals, and wrote the children's stories, Tales of Sir Benjamin Bulbous, Bart and The Basement Bogle. Two more books, The Nixie From Rotterdam and Tales of the Taunus Mountains, followed in 1937.

After the Second World War, she moved into the 5.5 acres (2.2 ha) Lear Cottage, near Coleman's Hatch in the Ashdown Forest, East Sussex. Dehn and her family became self-sufficient, raising geese, hens, pigs and sheep and grew fruit and vegetables. In 1946, she authored Come In, which was followed by Folk Tales two years later. Dehn followed with the writing of Higgly-Piggly Farm in 1957 and The Pike Dream in 1958. She won £50 from a radio drama competition with There I Must Be about her experiences of the First World War, and used the winnings to purchase a Red Dexter cow. Dehn's Maran cockerel was awarded first prize at the 1958 National Poultry Show, and was a columnist for Pig Producer magazine. She also wrote for The Observer and Country Life Punch. In the 1960s, she wrote The Caretakers, The Caretakers and the Poacher, The Caretakers and the Gipsy, The Caretakers to the Rescue, The Caretakers of Wilmhurst and Spectacles for the Mole.

Dehn was a member of the Committee of 100 not long after it was founded in 1960. She was involved in non-violent direct action against nuclear power, and was arrested and deported from Moscow by the KGB in 1974, for protesting against the abuse of psychiatry in the Soviet Union. Dehn and her husband campaigned successfully to have the Soviet dissident Vladimir Bukovsky released in 1976. Her final children's story, Good-bye Day, was published in 1980. She continued to write poetry, and took the Central Electricity Generating Board to court for "conspiring with the government to make plutonium for the making of nuclear weapons" in 1988. Dehn lost the case. In 2006, she published the compilation Out of My Mind: poems 1929–1995, which were primarily composed of rural themes. That same year, Dehn talked about her life and career on an episode of the BBC Radio 4 programme Woman's Hour.

== Personal life and legacy ==
She described herself as a "granarchist" and did not have rules at home. Dehn was married to the actor and libertian anarchist David Markham from 5 June 1937 until his death in 1983. They had four daughters: Sonia, Petra, Kika and Jehane. Through the marriages of her daughters Kika and Jehane, Dehn was the mother-in-law of the actors Roger Lloyd-Pack and Corin Redgrave. She died on 21 March 2007, at her home in Coleman's Hatch, East Sussex.

The Olive Dehn Papers are stored at the Seven Stories in Newcastle. Her papers were deposited at the museum by her daughters.
