= Petra Markham =

British actress (born 1944)

- Born: Petra Maria Markham; 17 March 1947 (age 79); Prestbury, Cheshire, England
- Occupation: Actress
- Years active: 1964–present
- Spouse: David Walsh
- Parent(s): David Markham; Olive Dehn
- Relatives: Kika Markham (sister)

Petra Maria Markham (born 17 March 1947) is a British theatre, television and film actress.

== Biography ==
Born on 17 March 1944, she is a daughter of actor David Markham and writer Olive Dehn (1914–2007). She had three sisters: actress Kika Markham (born 1940), poet and playwright Jehane Markham (1949–2024), and make-up artist Sonia Markham (1938–2016).

== Filmography ==
Year	Title	Role	Notes
1966	The Deadly Affair	Daughter at Theatre	
1970	Fragment of Fear	Schoolgirl	
1971	Sunday Bloody Sunday	Designer's Girlfriend	
1971	Get Carter	Doreen Carter	
1971	The Raging Moon	Mary	
1973	The Hireling	Edith	
2008	Lady Godiva	Jemima's Mother (Pink Dragon)	
2010	Cemetery Junction		Uncredited

== Television appearances ==
Year	Title	Role	Notes
1964-1968	Z-Cars	Elizabeth Cooper/Jill Scanlon	2 episodes
1965	Emergency Ward 10	Julie Callahan	4 episodes
1965	Doctor Who	Safiya	Serial: "The Crusade"
1965	The Sullavan Brothers	Kath	Episode: "Put Them Away for Keeps"
1965	The Newcomers	Sandra Turner	1 episode
1966	The Wednesday Play	Loola	Episode: "Ape and Essence"
1966	Thirteen Against Fate	Hélène	Episode: "The Schoolmaster"
1966	Armchair Theatre	Dinky	Episode: "Barrett Keller: His Mark"
1966-1971	Thirty-Minute Theatre	Various	3 episodes
1967	This Man Craig	Ruth Leggat	Episode: "There's Got to Be a Fire Somewhere"
1967	Softly, Softly	Marie Berry	Episode: "An Eye for an Eye"
1967	Who Is Sylvia?		Episode: "The Three Dreaded Faces of Eve"
1967	The Revenue Men	Judy	Episode: "A Pretty Flat Kind of Existence"
1967	BBC Play of the Month	Edelgard	Episode: "Girls in Uniform"
1967	Theatre 625	Sophie Solymosi	Episode: "The Burning Bush"
1968	The Charlie Drake Show		1 episode
1968	Market in Honey Lane	Sally Sampson	2 episodes
1968	Marty	Various	1 episode
1969	The First Lady		Episode: "A Banner with a Strange Device"
1969	The Expert	Angela Haskins	Episode: "Your Money for My Life"
1969	Detective	Renee	Episode: "Hunt the Peacock"
1969	Curry and Chips	Norman's Daughter	1 episode
1970-1971	Albert and Victoria	Lydia Hackett	10 episodes
1971	Follyfoot	Ginny Tuckwood	Episode: "The Standstill Horse"
1972	Ace of Wands	Mikki Diamond	Season 3
1973	ITV Saturday Night Theatre	Maureen	Episode: "The Regulars"
1973	Public Eye	Jenny Wellard	Episode: "The Trouble with Jenny"
1974	General Hospital	Barbara Lytton	1 episode
1974	Marked Personal	Lorraine	1 episode
1974	Thriller	Helga	Episode: "A Killer in Every Corner"
1977	Ripping Yarns	Enid Bag	Episode: "The Testing of Eric Olthwaite"
1983	Angels	Felicity	3 episodes
1984	Play for Today	Mrs. Richardson	Episode: "Young Shoulders"
1985	Bergerac	Suzie Borden	Episode: "Sins of the Fathers"
1985	BBC Television Shakespeare	Katharine	Episode: Love's Labour's Lost
1989-1996	The Bill	Mrs. Belcham/Mrs. Green	2 episodes
1990	The Ruth Rendell Mysteries	Hotel Receptionist	Episode: "Some Lie and Some Die"
1993	EastEnders	Rose Chapman	13 episodes
1995	Peak Practice	Cissy Banks	Episode: "Coming Out"
1997	Plotlands	Grace Foster	4 episodes
2007	Doctors	Penny Cable	Episode: "Post Mortem"
2008	Hotel Babylon	Cheating Husband's Wife	1 episode
2009	Criminal Justice	Family Court Judge	1 episode
