= A Murder of Quality (film) =

1991 British television film

- Based on: A Murder of Quality by John le Carré
- Written by: John le Carré
- Directed by: Gavin Millar
- Starring: Denholm Elliott; Joss Ackland; Glenda Jackson; Billie Whitelaw; Diane Fletcher; David Threlfall; Christian Bale
- Music by: Stanley Myers
- Country of origin: United Kingdom
- Original language: English

Production
- Producer: Eric Abraham
- Cinematography: Denis Crossan
- Editor: Angus Newton
- Running time: 103 minutes
- Production companies: Portobello Pictures; Thames Television

Original release
- Network: ITV
- Release: 10 April 1991
- Network: A&E
- Release: 13 October 1991

A Murder of Quality is a 1991 television film directed by Gavin Millar and a screenplay written by John le Carré, based on his 1962 novel A Murder of Quality , first screened on 10 April 1991 on ITV in the United Kingdom.

== Plot ==
George Smiley, at the request of his old wartime colleague Ailsa Brimley, investigates the murder of Stella Rode. A letter had previously come to Brimley from Rode detailing a plot supposedly by her husband, Stanley Rode, who teaches at Carne School, to kill her. Upon investigating, Smiley learns of many secrets that were kept by the victim, one being that Terence Fielding, a house master at Carne, was being blackmailed by her due to past homosexual activities. Smiley solves the investigation when it is revealed that it was not Stanley Rode who murdered his wife, but Terence Fielding.

== Cast ==
- Denholm Elliott as George Smiley
- Joss Ackland as Terence Fielding
- Glenda Jackson as Ailsa Brimley
- Billie Whitelaw as Mad Janie
- Diane Fletcher as Shane Hecht
- David Threlfall as Stanley Rode
- Christian Bale as Tim Perkins
- Nick Lewis as Tim Perkins's Friend

== Critical reception ==
The New York Times wrote "Chronic Anglophiles can be assured that Mr. le Carre's fury is generally conveyed with ingrained British understatement and good manners. A top-notch cast makes sure of that. Mr. Elliott is perfect as the gray, piercingly intelligent Smiley; and his co-stars are sparkling."
