= David Markham =

British actor (1913–1983)

- Born: Peter Basil Harrison; 3 April 1913; Wick, Worcestershire, England
- Died: 15 December 1983 (aged 70); Hartfield, East Sussex, England
- Occupation: Actor
- Years active: 1938–1983
- Spouse: Olive Dehn (m. 1937)
- Children: 4, including Kika, Petra and Jehane Markham
- Relatives: Roger Lloyd-Pack (son-in-law); Corin Redgrave (son-in-law)

David Markham (3 April 1913 – 15 December 1983) was an English stage and film actor for over forty years.

Markham was born Peter Basil Harrison in Wick, Worcestershire and died in Hartfield, East Sussex.

In 1937 he married Olive Dehn (1914–2007), a BBC Radio dramatist. They had four daughters: Sonia, an illustrator and counsellor; Kika (b. 1940), an actress, widow of actor Corin Redgrave; Petra (b. 1944), an actress; and Jehane, a poet and dramatist, widow of actor Roger Lloyd-Pack.

In World War II, he was imprisoned as a conscientious objector, before being allowed to do forestry work.

In 1970 he became very involved in the campaign to release Vladimir Bukovsky from psychiatric detention in the USSR. He helped found the Campaign Against Psychaitric Abuse and was strong defender of individual human rights against the state.

Markham appeared occasionally in cinema and often on television. He appeared in Carol Reed's film The Stars Look Down (1939) and in François Truffaut's films Two English Girls (1972), in which he plays a fortuneteller with his daughter Kika, and Day for Night (1973). He appeared briefly in Richard Attenborogh's film Gandhi (1982).

His first television appearance was in the 1946 film of Candida, where he played Eugene Marchbanks.[9] He may have been with Peter Wyngarde in a BBC television play called "The Rope", broadcast on 12 January 1950. He played the father of Robin Phillips in two films, Two Gentlemen Sharing (1969) and Tales From The Crypt (1972).

Markham portrayed Prime Minister H. H. Asquith (a close look-alike) in the 1981 BBC Wales drama The Life and Times of David Lloyd George, alongside his daughter Kika Markham, who played Lloyd George's secretary, lover and later second wife – Frances Stevenson.

== Selected filmography ==
- Murder in the Family (1938) – Michael Osborne
- "Candida" (1946) - G B Shaw. TV Film
- The Stars Look Down (1940) – Arthur Barras
- The Blakes Slept Here (1953) – Edward
- Nom-de-Plume: "The Man Who Made People" (1956) – Alexandre
- Electrode 93 (1957) TV series – David Williams
- The Dawn Killer (1959) – Mr. Hawkes
- Last of the Long-haired Boys (1968) – Brindle
- Two Gentlemen Sharing (1969) – Mr. Pater – Roddy's Father
- Family Life (1971)
- Blood from the Mummy's Tomb (1971) – Doctor Burgess
- Two English Girls (1972) – Palmist
- Tales From The Crypt (1972) – Father – Edward Elliot (segment 3 "Poetic Justice")
- Z.P.G. (1972) – Dr. Herrick
- Day for Night (1973) – Doctor Michael Nelson
- La guerre du pétrole n'aura pas lieu (1975) – Thomson
- Feelings (1975) – Professor Roland
- The Three Hostages (1977) – Greenslade
- La petite fille en velours bleu (1978) – Consul
- Off to Philadelphia in the Morning (1978) – William Sterndale Bennett
- Meetings with Remarkable Men (1979) – Dean Borsh
- Tess (1979) – Reverend Clare
- Richard's Things (1980) – Mr Morris
- The Life and Times of David Lloyd George (1981) TV series – Herbert Henry Asquith
- Winston Churchill: The Wilderness Years (1981) (mini) TV series – Marlborough
- Gandhi (1982) – Older Englishman
