= The Spy Who Came In from the Cold (film) =

1965 British film by Martin Ritt

- Theatrical release poster by Howard Terpning
- Directed by: Martin Ritt
- Screenplay by: Paul Dehn; Guy Trosper
- Based on: The Spy Who Came in from the Cold (1963 novel) by John le Carré
- Produced by: Martin Ritt
- Starring: Richard Burton; Claire Bloom; Oskar Werner
- Cinematography: Oswald Morris
- Edited by: Anthony Harvey
- Music by: Sol Kaplan
- Production company: Salem Films Ltd.
- Distributed by: Paramount Pictures
- Release dates: 16 December 1965 (US); 13 January 1966 (UK)
- Running time: 112 minutes
- Country: United Kingdom
- Language: English
- Box office: $7,600,000

The Spy Who Came In from the Cold is a 1965 British spy film directed and produced by Martin Ritt, adapted by Paul Dehn and Guy Trosper from the 1963 novel by John le Carré. It stars Richard Burton, Claire Bloom, and Oskar Werner, and features Sam Wanamaker, Cyril Cusack, Rupert Davies, George Voskovec, and Peter van Eyck in supporting roles.

The film depicts British MI6 agent Alec Leamas' (Burton) mission as a faux defector who is given the task of sowing damaging disinformation about a powerful East German intelligence officer (Werner). As part of a charade, Leamas is apparently dismissed from the British secret intelligence service and becomes an embittered alcoholic. He also strikes up a relationship with Nan Perry (Bloom), a British communist. He is soon approached by East German agents in Britain, and he allows himself to be recruited and taken to continental Europe to sell his secrets for money. The plots of the rival spy agencies unfold, and prove more complicated than Leamas expected.

The Spy Who Came In from the Cold was a box-office success, receiving positive reviews and several awards, including four BAFTA Awards for Best British Film, Best Actor (for Burton), Best Cinematography, and Best Production Design. For their performances, Burton was also nominated for the Academy Award for Best Actor while Werner won the Golden Globe Award for Best Supporting Actor. The film was named one of the top ten films of 1965 by the National Board of Review in the United States.

== Plot ==
The West Berlin office of MI6, under station chief Alec Leamas, has suffered from reduced effectiveness. He is recalled to London shortly after the death of one of his operatives and is seemingly drummed out of the agency. In reality, a carefully staged transformation of Leamas has been arranged by Control, the agency's chief. Appearing to be depressed, embittered and alcoholic, Leamas takes work as an assistant at a local library. There he begins a relationship with his colleague Nan Perry, a young and idealistic member of the British Communist Party. Leamas spends most of his small salary on alcohol, leaving him constantly low on funds. He drunkenly assaults a shopkeeper who refuses him credit and is briefly jailed. His predicament attracts the attention of the East German Intelligence Service, which sees him as a potential defector.

Leamas is approached by a series of operatives, each one passing him up the chain of the East German intelligence service, and he expresses a willingness to sell British secrets for money. He eventually flies to the Netherlands to meet an agent named Peters, who decides that his information is important enough to send him on to East Germany. At a German country house, Leamas is introduced to Jens Fiedler, who becomes his main interrogator. Leamas then begins to carry out his secret mission, which is to share information that suggests a high-ranking East German intelligence officer named Mundt is a paid informant of the British. The evidence is circumstantial, and though it seems to implicate Mundt, Leamas repeatedly rejects that conclusion, claiming that an important East German official could not have been a British agent without his knowledge. However, Fiedler is able to independently confirm Leamas' information and comes to the conclusion that Mundt, his supervisor, has indeed been a secret asset of British intelligence for many years.

Mundt himself unexpectedly arrives at the compound and has both Leamas and Fiedler arrested for plotting against him. Once Fiedler explains his findings to his superiors, the tables are turned and Mundt is arrested. A secret tribunal is convened to try Mundt for espionage, with Leamas compelled to testify. Fiedler presents a strong case for Mundt being a paid double agent. However, Mundt's attorney uncovers several discrepancies in Leamas' transformation into an informant, suggesting that Leamas is a faux defector. Leamas' credibility collapses when Nan, who has been brought to East Germany for what she thought was a cultural exchange visit, is forced to testify at the tribunal and unwittingly reveals that she has been receiving payments from a British intelligence officer as Leamas had arranged. Faced with this testimony, Leamas reluctantly admits that he is indeed a British agent. Mundt is vindicated, and Fiedler is arrested as a complicit dupe.

Leamas initially believes he has failed in his mission and fears severe retribution from Mundt. However, in the middle of the night, Mundt releases Leamas and Nan from their cells and provides an escape plan for them both. Mundt explains that Leamas' real mission has succeeded; Mundt actually is a British agent, and Fiedler had been the target of the operation all along, as he had grown too suspicious of his supervisor. This comes as a shock to Leamas, and the complex web he has been drawn into and the risk he has been placed in by his own superiors become painfully clear. He explains the entire plot to still-idealistic Nan as they drive their borrowed car toward the border. She berates him for being involved in what amounts to the murder of Fiedler, who was only doing his job. Leamas, agitated by her naiveté, erupts in an angry, self-loathing confession:

What the hell do you think spies are? Moral philosophers measuring everything they do against the word of God or Karl Marx? They're not. They're just a bunch of seedy squalid bastards like me, little men, drunkards, queers, henpecked husbands, civil servants playing "Cowboys and Indians" to brighten their rotten little lives. Do you think they sit like monks in a cell, balancing right against wrong? Yesterday I would have killed Mundt because I thought him evil and an enemy. But not today. Today he is evil and my friend.

Leamas and Nan arrive at the Berlin Wall and are given instructions to climb over to West Germany on an emergency ladder while a searchlight is intentionally turned away. Leamas is at the top of the wall pulling Nan up behind him when the searchlight suddenly shines directly on them, alarms sound, and Nan is shot dead by Mundt's operatives, silencing the only civilian witness to the operation. Leamas freezes in shock and horror, and is urged by agents on both sides to return to the West. Instead, he begins to climb down towards Nan's body on the eastern side of the wall, where he is also shot and killed.

== Cast ==
- Richard Burton as Alec Leamas
- Claire Bloom as Nan Perry
- Oskar Werner as Jens Fiedler
- Sam Wanamaker as Peters
- George Voskovec as Karden
- Rupert Davies as George Smiley
- Cyril Cusack as Control
- Peter van Eyck as Hans-Dieter Mundt
- Michael Hordern as Ashe
- Robert Hardy as Dick Carlton
- Bernard Lee as Patmore
- Beatrix Lehmann, Esmond Knight, and Steve Plytas as Tribunal Members
- Niall MacGinnis and George Mikell as Checkpoint Charlie Guards
- Scot Finch as East German Guide
- Tom Stern as CIA Agent
- Anne Blake as Miss Crail
- Richard Marner as VoPo Captain
- Warren Mitchell as Mr. Zanfrello

Uncredited

- Nancy Nevinson as Mrs. Zanfrello
- Walter Gotell as Holten
- John Quentin as Pawson
- Richard Caldicot as Pitt
- Geoffrey Keen as British Sentry
- Philip Madoc as Officer
- Michael Ripper as Mr. Lofthouse
- Kathy Keeton as Stripper
- Harry Baird as American Checkpoint Charlie Guard

== Production ==
=== Development and casting ===
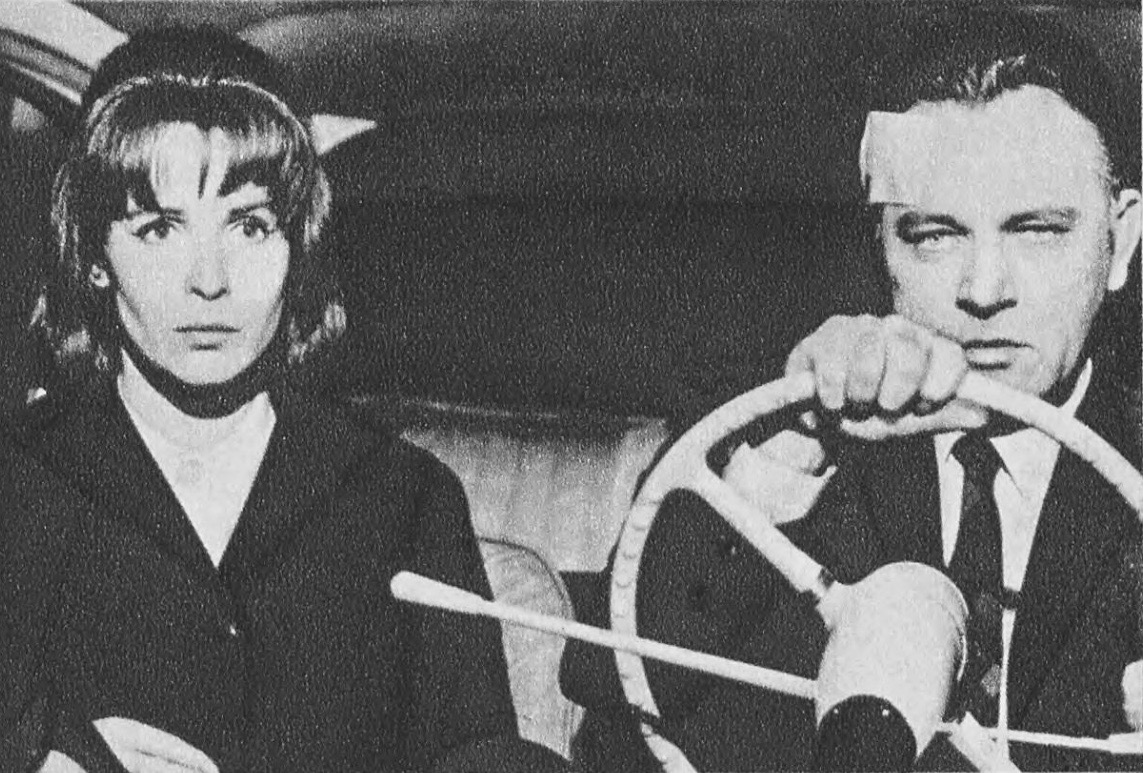
Nan Perry (Claire Bloom) and Alec Leamas (Richard Burton) in a publicity image

The script was co-written by Paul Dehn, who had worked in the Special Operations Executive as an assassin during World War II. The film closely follows the plot of the original source text. One exception is that the name of the principal female character in the novel, Liz Gold, is changed to Nan Perry in the film, reputedly because Martin Ritt was worried about the potential confusion in the media with Burton's wife, Elizabeth Taylor. Le Carré's preferred choice was Rita Tushingham, he initially felt Bloom was "too beautiful, classy," but later changed his mind, feeling she provided a proper foil to Burton.

Le Carré favoured Trevor Howard or Peter Finch for the role of Leamas, but they were rejected for not being enough of a box office draw; Burt Lancaster was also considered but was rejected for not being able to put on a convincing British accent. Richard Burton, the eventual choice of the producers, butted heads with director Martin Ritt during the course of the production. The atmosphere on set was also tense from both the presence of Burton's wife, Elizabeth Taylor, as well as the romantic history between co-stars Burton and Bloom. Burton had initially demanded Taylor play Perry, but Martin Ritt insisted on Bloom.

Several of the key cast and crew were expatriate Americans who had been blacklisted, including director Martin Ritt, actor Sam Wanamaker and composer Sol Kaplan. Some of the cast and crew had previously worked on the James Bond films, including screenwriter Paul Dehn (who wrote Goldfinger) and actor Bernard Lee (the original M).

=== Filming ===
England's Shepperton Studios and Ardmore Studios in Ireland and were used for the shooting of interior scenes, with most of the external West Berlin scenes shot in Dublin. A recreation of Checkpoint Charlie was constructed in Dublin's Smithfield Plaza. The exterior scenes in the East German Alps were filmed at Garmisch-Partenkirchen in Bavaria, West Germany. Scenes were filmed in the Netherlands in Noordwijk and at Amsterdam Airport Schiphol.

The remainder of the film was shot in London, at several locations including HM Prison Wormwood Scrubs, Battersea Park, and Trafalgar Square. The exterior of George Smiley's safe house was located at 19 Bramerton Street in Chelsea.

Richard Burton demanded that Le Carré rewrite his dialogue on the set, though the effect of his changes were limited. Le Carré opined in his autobiography The Pigeon Tunnel: Stories from My Life that Burton had mostly wanted him there as a drinking buddy, and to mediate his clashes with Ritt. "Burton was a literate, serious artist, a self-educated polymath with appetites and flaws that in one way or another we all share," he wrote of their relationship.

== Release ==
=== Box office ===
The Spy Who Came In from the Cold took in $7,600,000 at the box office.

=== Home media ===
The film was released by The Criterion Collection as a Region 1 DVD on 25 November 2008 and on Blu-ray on 10 September 2013. Extras for this version include: digitally restored picture and sound; an interview with John le Carré; scene-specific commentary by director of photography Oswald Morris; a BBC documentary titled The Secret Centre: John le Carré (2000); an interview with Richard Burton from a 1967 episode of the BBC series Acting in the '60s; a 1985 audio interview with director Martin Ritt; a gallery of set designs; the film's theatrical trailer; and a booklet featuring an essay by film critic Michael Sragow.

== Reception ==
The film holds a score of 86% on Rotten Tomatoes based on 14 reviews, with an average grade of 7.7 out of 10.

Bosley Crowther of The New York Times wrote, "After all the spy and mystery movies of a romantic and implausible nature that we have seen, it is great to see one as realistic, and believable too, as The Spy Who Came In from the Cold." Variety called the film "an excellent contemporary espionage drama of the Cold War which achieves solid impact via emphasis on human values, total absence of mechanical spy gimmickry, and perfectly controlled underplaying." Philip K. Scheuer of the Los Angeles Times wrote: "It is not an easy, certainly not a pleasant, picture to sit through; too impersonal, too objective, to move us to weep, so that its ending can only leave us tremendously depressed." Richard L. Coe of The Washington Post declared: "Not having shared the evidently widespread admiration for The Spy Who Came In from the Cold in its original form as a novel, I nonetheless find it a wholly absorbing picture." Brendan Gill of The New Yorker called it "in every respect an admirable translation [to] the screen of the fantastically popular thriller by Jean [sic] le Carré." The Monthly Film Bulletin wrote, "Concentration is demanded; and earned by the tension and accuracy of the dialogue and the high level of performance ... [the cast] all give performances of a kind which instantly engage attention, even if the characters scarcely develop beyond the point at which we first meet them."

=== Awards and nominations ===
Award	Category	Nominee(s)	Result	Ref.
Academy Awards	Best Actor	Richard Burton	Nominated	
Academy Awards	Best Art Direction – Black-and-White	Art Direction: Hal Pereira, Tambi Larsen, Ted Marshall; Set Decoration: Josie MacAvin	Nominated	
British Academy Film Awards	Best Film	Martin Ritt	Nominated	
British Academy Film Awards	Best British Film	Martin Ritt	Won	
British Academy Film Awards	Best British Actor	Richard Burton (also for Who's Afraid of Virginia Woolf?)	Won	
British Academy Film Awards	Best Foreign Actor	Oskar Werner	Nominated	
British Academy Film Awards	Best British Art Direction – Black and White	Tambi Larsen	Won	
British Academy Film Awards	Best British Cinematography – Black and White	Oswald Morris	Won	
British Society of Cinematographers Awards	Best Cinematography in a Theatrical Feature Film	Oswald Morris	Won	
David di Donatello Awards	Best Foreign Actor	Richard Burton	Won	
Edgar Allan Poe Awards	Best Motion Picture	Paul Dehn, Guy Trosper	Won	
Golden Globe Awards	Best Supporting Actor – Motion Picture	Oskar Werner	Won	
Laurel Awards	Top Male Dramatic Performance	Richard Burton	Won	
National Board of Review Awards	Top Ten Films		5th Place	
Writers Guild of America Awards	Best Written American Drama	Paul Dehn, Guy Trosper	Nominated	
