= The Deadly Affair =

1967 film by Sidney Lumet

- Theatrical release poster
- Directed by: Sidney Lumet
- Written by: Paul Dehn
- Based on: Call for the Dead by John le Carré
- Produced by: Sidney Lumet
- Starring: James Mason; Maximilian Schell; Harriet Andersson; Harry Andrews; Simone Signoret; Kenneth Haigh; Roy Kinnear; Max Adrian; Lynn Redgrave
- Cinematography: Freddie Young
- Edited by: Thelma Connell
- Music by: Quincy Jones
- Production company: Sidney Lumet Film Productions
- Distributed by: British Lion-Columbia (UK); Columbia Pictures (US)
- Release dates: 26 January 1967 (New York City); 2 February 1967 (London-premiere); 7 April 1967 (United Kingdom)
- Running time: 107 minutes
- Country: United Kingdom
- Language: English
- Budget: $1.4 million

The Deadly Affair is a 1967 British spy film based on John le Carré's first novel, Call for the Dead (1961). The film stars James Mason and was directed by Sidney Lumet from a script by Paul Dehn.

As it is a Columbia Pictures production and Paramount owned the film rights to the name George Smiley, the central character is renamed Charles Dobbs; however, his police liaison Mendel and wife Ann's names are retained. Paramount had acquired the film rights to the Smiley character name when filming The Spy Who Came In from the Cold (1965).

The soundtrack was composed by Quincy Jones, and the bossa nova theme song, "Who Needs Forever", was performed by Astrud Gilberto.

== Plot ==
In 1960s London, Charles Dobbs is a staid MI6 operative investigating Foreign Office official Samuel Fennan, a former Communist who apparently commits suicide. Dobbs becomes suspicious about the cause of Fennan's death while visiting Fennan's widow the morning after his death. When a wake-up call is received at Fennan's home, his widow Elsa says the call was for her. Dobbs discovers this to be a lie and as a result suspects that Elsa, a survivor of a Nazi extermination camp, might have some clues regarding Fennan's death.

Other government officials want Dobbs to drop the case. However, Dobbs privately links up with retired police inspector Mendel to continue enquiries and they uncover a network of East European agents, one of whom assaults Dobbs, breaking his hand. Dobbs also discovers that his promiscuous wife Ann is leaving him to go to Switzerland to join a former World War II colleague, Dieter Frey.

Dobbs ultimately decides to set a trap to prove that Elsa is a spy and to uncover her control by arranging a rendezvous which takes place in the Aldwych theatre during a performance of "Edward II". Dobbs, his colleague Bill Appleby and Mendel observe Elsa and wait to see who will sit in the empty seat next to her. Dobbs is sickened to see that it is Dieter who sits down next to Elsa and is her control. When Dieter and Elsa realise they have been set up, Dieter quietly kills Elsa and slips out of the theatre. Mendel follows Dieter to his hideout and summons Dobbs. In the final confrontation, Dieter shoots Mendel but is himself killed bare-handed by the enraged Dobbs, who uses the cast on his hand as a bludgeon.

Dobbs flies to Zurich where he is met at the airport by Ann.

== Cast ==
- James Mason as Charles Dobbs
- Simone Signoret as Elsa Fennan
- Maximilian Schell as Dieter Frey
- Harriet Andersson as Ann Dobbs
- Harry Andrews as Mendel
- Kenneth Haigh as Bill Appleby
- Roy Kinnear as Adam Scarr
- Max Adrian as Advisor
- Lynn Redgrave as Virgin
- Robert Flemyng as Samuel Fennan
- Leslie Sands as Inspector
- Corin Redgrave as Larry
- Sheraton Blount as Eunice Scarr (uncredited)
- Denis Shaw as Wilf the Barman (uncredited)
- David Warner as the actor playing Edward II in the Aldwych Theatre
- Michael Bryant as the actor playing Gaveston in the Aldwych Theatre

== Production ==
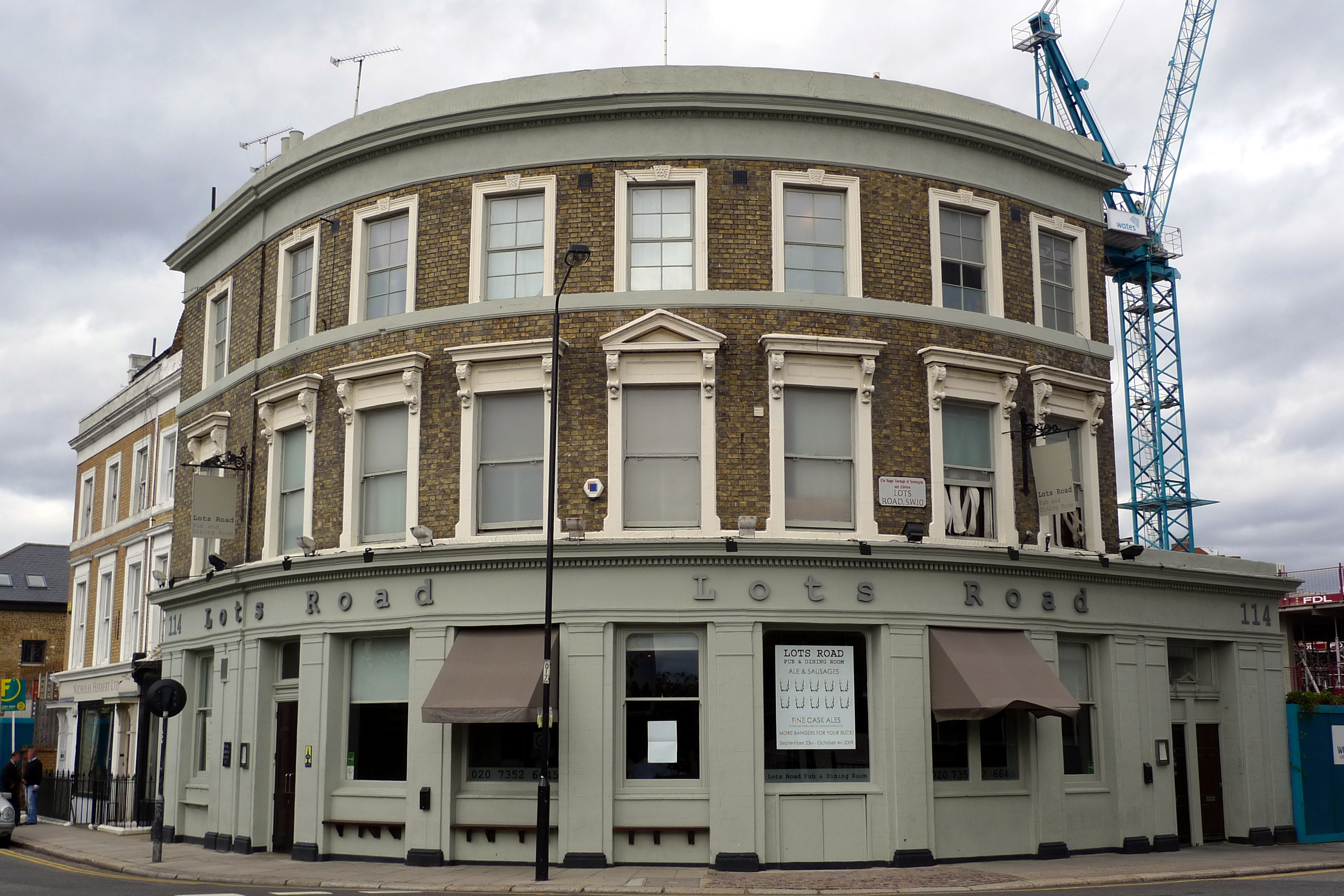
The former Balloon Tavern

Location shooting for The Deadly Affair took place in London, in St. James's Park, at The Balloon Tavern and Chelsea Embankment in Chelsea, in Battersea and Barnes, in Twickenham, and at the Serpentine Restaurant in Hyde Park (demolished in 1990). The exterior of Dobbs's house is in St. George's Square, Pimlico. For the theatre scene a performance of the Royal Shakespeare Company's Edward II (as directed for the stage by Peter Hall) was recreated at its real location of the Aldwych Theatre, London.

Director of photography Freddie Young's technique of pre-exposing the colour film negative to a small, controlled amount of light (known as "flashing" or "pre-fogging") in order to create a muted colour palette was first used in this film. Lumet called the result "colourless colour" and it proved influential, being used by other cinematographers such as Vilmos Zsigmond on McCabe & Mrs. Miller.

The plot is fairly faithful to the book; however, a romantic affair between Ann and Dieter was added and the character of Mendel is shot at the film's climax to provoke Dobbs's brutal beating of Dieter.

== Awards and honours ==
The Deadly Affair received five BAFTA Awards nominations: Best British Film for Sidney Lumet, Best British Screenplay for Paul Dehn, Best British Cinematography (Colour) for Freddie Young, Best Foreign Actress for Simone Signoret, and Best British Actor for James Mason. However, it did not win any of the awards.

== Musical score and soundtrack ==
The Deadly Affair

Soundtrack album by Quincy Jones
- Released: January 1967
- Recorded: December 1966
- Studios: Van Gelder Studio, Englewood Cliffs, NJ
- Genre: Film score
- Length: 28:05
- Labels: Verve; V-8679/V-8679 ST
- Producer: Creed Taylor

Quincy Jones chronology
Walk, Don't Run (1966)	The Deadly Affair (1967)	Enter Laughing (1967)

Professional ratings
Review scores
Source	Rating
Allmusic	4/5 stars

The film score was composed, arranged and conducted by Quincy Jones, and the soundtrack album was released on the Verve label in 1967.

Allmusic's Stephen Cook noted, "Deadly Affair's dreamy mix of bossa nova moods and unobtrusive symphonics still makes for some pleasant, if not always provocative, listening. Plus, one gets to hear Astrud Gilberto in fine fettle on the opening cut". The Vinyl Factory said "This soundtrack to the Sidney Lumet thriller starts off with Astrud Gilberto drizzling her best desultory vocal over ‘Who Needs Forever’, which creates a moody atmosphere that is sustained throughout the entire album. With its languid orchestrations, breezy strings, and airy samba rhythms, this is a perfect Sunday morning record".

=== Track listing ===
All compositions by Quincy Jones

1. "Who Needs Forever" (lyrics by Howard Greenfield) − 3:00
2. "Dieter's First Mistake" − 4:50
3. "Instrumental Main Theme (1)" − 2:05
4. "Postcard Signed "S" / Mendel Tails Elsa / Tickets to "S"" − 5:31
5. "Instrumental Main Theme (2)" − 3:00
6. "Don't Fly If It's Foggy" − 1:11
7. "Blondie-Tails" − 1:13
8. "Instrumental Main Theme (3)" − 2:05
9. "Ridiculous Scene" − 1:48
10. "Body on Elevator" − 0:55
11. "Bobb's at Gunpoint" − 0:45
12. "End Title" − 1:42

=== Personnel ===
- Unidentified orchestra arranged and conducted by Quincy Jones featuring:
  - Hank Jones − piano
  - Astrud Gilberto − vocals (track 1)
