= George Smiley =

Fictional British intelligence officer

- Gary Oldman as Smiley in Tinker Tailor Soldier Spy (2011)
- First appearance: Call for the Dead
- Last appearance: Karla's Choice
- Created by: John le Carré
- Portrayed by: Rupert Davies (1965); James Mason (1966); George Cole (1978, 1981); Alec Guinness (1979, 1982); Peter Vaughan (1983); Bernard Hepton (1988, 1990); Denholm Elliott (1991); Simon Russell Beale (2009–2010); Gary Oldman (2011); John Ramm (2024–2025); Tony Turner (2026); Matthew Macfadyen (TBA)

In-universe information
- Gender: Male
- Occupation: Intelligence officer
- Affiliation: The Circus
- Spouse: Lady Ann Sercomb
- Nationality: British

George Smiley OBE is a fictional character created by John le Carré. Smiley is a career intelligence officer with "The Circus", the British overseas intelligence agency. He is a central character in the novels Call for the Dead, A Murder of Quality, Tinker Tailor Soldier Spy, The Honourable Schoolboy, Smiley's People and Karla's Choice, and a supporting character in The Spy Who Came in from the Cold, The Looking Glass War, The Secret Pilgrim and A Legacy of Spies. The character has also appeared in a number of film, television, and radio adaptations of le Carré's books.

Le Carré created Smiley as an intentional contrast to James Bond, a character who he believed depicted an inaccurate and damaging version of espionage. Short, overweight, balding and bespectacled, Smiley is polite and self-effacing and frequently allows others to mistreat him, including his serially unfaithful wife; these traits mask his inner cunning, excellent memory, mastery of tradecraft and occasional ruthlessness. His genius, coupled with other characters' willingness to underestimate him, allows Smiley to achieve his goals and ultimately become one of the most powerful spies in Britain.

The Guardian has called him "the sort of spy [Britain] believes it ought to have: a bit shabby, academic, basically loyal, and sceptical of the enthusiasms of his political masters."

== Description ==
In contrast to most other fictional spies of the era, Smiley is described as being short, overweight, balding and middle-aged, and he is frequently compared to either a toad or a mole. Whereas cinematic adaptations tend to depict him in dark three-piece suits, the novels describe his clothing as being "really bad", with other characters remarking that he "dresses like a bookie"; characters and narration clarify that this refers to his clothes being very loose and baggy, the result of his tailor taking advantage of Smiley's ignorance of men's fashion to charge him more money for the extra fabric. He wears thick, round glasses and tends to clean the lenses on the 'fat' end of his tie while contemplating something of great significance; the gesture is frequent enough that other characters consider it to be something of a trademark.

The American scholars Norman Polmar and Thomas Allen identified Smiley as the fictional spy most likely to be successful as a real spy, citing le Carré's description of him in A Murder of Quality:

Obscurity was his nature, as well as his profession. The byways of espionage are not populated by the brash and colorful adventurers of fiction. A man who, like Smiley, has lived and worked for years among his country's enemies learns only one prayer: that he may never, never be noticed. Assimilation is his highest aim, he learns to love the crowds who pass him in the street without a glance; he clings to them for his anonymity and his safety. His fear makes him servile—he could embrace the shoppers who jostle him in their impatience and force him from the pavement. He could adore the officials, the police, the bus conductors, for the terse indifference of their attitudes. But this fear, this servility, this dependence had developed in Smiley a perception for the colour of human beings: a swift, feminine sensitivity to their characters and motives. He knew mankind as a huntsman knows his cover, as a fox the woods. For a spy must hunt while he is hunted, and the crowd is his estate. He could collect their gestures, record the interplay of glance and movement, as a huntsman can record the twisted bracken and broken twig, or as a fox detects the signs of danger

Polmar and Allen wrote that Smiley's banal qualities together with his intelligence and a talent for intrigue made him ideal as a spy even though he was very far from the popular stereotype of what a spy should be like. Smiley's wife Ann calls him "breathtakingly ordinary", which Polmar and Allen wrote was an advantage for a spy, the very nature of their profession which requires them to be as inconspicuous as possible. In 1980, le Carré defined Smiley's politics: "I think he stands where I stand; he feels that to pit yourself against any 'ism' is to strike a posture which is itself ideological and therefore offensive in terms of practical decency. In practice almost any political ideology invites you to set aside your humanitarian instincts". The world of espionage presented by le Carré in his novels was a world where lies, betrayal, intrigue and paranoia were the norm for both sides, and much of the appeal of Smiley was that of a moral man trying his best to stay decent in a profoundly amoral world.

=== Age ===
Although Smiley ages through his appearances over a half-century, Le Carré has frequently retconned elements of his backstory so that he exists on something of a floating timeline. In his initial appearance in 1961's Call for the Dead, Smiley is somewhere around 55 years of age; changes to his birth year in Tinker Tailor Soldier Spy, set between 1973 and 1974, make him about 58 during the events of that story. He ages into his sixties during the subsequent two novels, The Honourable Schoolboy and Smiley's People, the latter of which depicts him in declining physical health as he grows older and heavier. However, although no reference is made to his age in 2017's A Legacy of Spies, set in 2014, he does not appear to be substantially older than he was in his last appearance, although he should be 99 years old during the events of the book (or 108 if the Call for the Dead chronology is in effect). This has led Dwight Garner of The New York Times to observe that Smiley is "one of those ashen Englishmen, like the poet Philip Larkin, who seem to be permanently 60 years old."

== Early life ==
Although Smiley has no concrete biography beyond that offered briefly at the beginning of Call for the Dead, le Carré does leave clues in his novels.

Smiley was born to middle-class parents in the South of England in the early part of the 20th century (his birth date is retconned from 1906 to 1915 in Tinker Tailor Soldier Spy), and spent at least part of his childhood in Germany near the Black Forest. He attended a minor public school and an antiquated Oxford college of no real distinction (in the 1982 BBC television adaptation of Smiley's People, he refers to himself as a fellow of Lincoln College, le Carré's alma mater in real life), studying modern languages with a particular focus on Baroque German literature. One July, while considering post-graduate study in that field, he was recruited into the Circus by his tutor, Jebedee.

Smiley underwent training and probation in Central Europe and South America, and spent the period from 1935 until approximately 1938 in Germany recruiting networks under cover as a lecturer. In 1939, with the commencement of World War II, he saw active service not only in Germany, but also in Switzerland and Sweden. Smiley's wartime superiors described him as having "the cunning of Satan and the conscience of a virgin". During this time, he met and recruited Dieter Frey, who would go on to become an East German intelligence operative running the intelligence circle that was the main plot point of Le Carré's first novel, Call for the Dead.

In 1943, he was recalled to England to work at Circus headquarters, and in 1945 successfully proposed marriage to Lady Ann Sercomb, a beautiful, aristocratic, and libidinous young lady working as a secretary there. Ann would soon prove herself chronically unfaithful, engaging in numerous affairs and occasionally leaving Smiley entirely, though she always returned to him after the initial excitement of the separation ended. In the same year, Smiley left the Service and returned to Oxford. However, in 1947, with the onset of the Cold War, Smiley was asked to return to the Service, and in early 1951 moved into counter-intelligence work, where he would remain for the next decade. It is reported with a reference to the real life Gouzenko affair that "the revelations of a young cipher clerk in Ottawa had created a new demand for men of Smiley's experience". In 1945, Igor Gouzenko, a Soviet cipher clerk at the Soviet embassy in Ottawa, defected and revealed a widespread Soviet spying network in the United States, the United Kingdom and Canada that came as a considerable shock to the leaders of western nations. During that period, Smiley first met his Soviet nemesis, Karla, in a Delhi prison. Karla proved impossible to crack, though an increasingly desperate Smiley inadvertently revealed his own weakness – his affection for his wife, Ann – during the interrogation. After he offered Karla the use of his cigarette lighter – a gift from his wife – Karla stole it, keeping it as a symbol of his victory over Smiley. The incident would continue to haunt Smiley for the remainder of his career.

== In the novels ==
=== The early novels ===
Smiley first appears in Call for the Dead, le Carré's 1961 debut novel. After an introductory chapter documenting Smiley's wartime bravery, the narrative moves to 1960, which finds the formerly heroic Smiley working a menial intelligence job, security-clearing civil servants. After a man he interviewed apparently commits suicide in despair over being a suspected communist, Smiley resigns from the Circus in disgust; the revelation that the man's death may in fact have been a murder spurs Smiley to launch an independent investigation with the help of his prôtégé, Peter Guillam, and police detective Oliver Mendel. Smiley's investigation uncovers that the "suicide" was in fact a murder perpetrated by an East German spy ring operating in the UK and being operated by one of his own former agents, whom he accidentally kills in a physical altercation. Although the Circus offers him his job back as a reward, Smiley declines, instead leaving England for a tentative reunion with Ann, who had earlier left him for a racing car driver. Smiley spends much of the story bemoaning the loss of the talented agents who were his mentors prior to the war, and their replacement by such talentless bureaucrats as the current head of service, Maston, who is widely, if secretly, mocked.

It is while pursuing a sedate life of scholastic research in German literature at a university in the West Country (probably Exeter) that he is called upon to investigate a murder at a fictional public school in le Carré's next novel, A Murder of Quality.

Smiley next reappears as a minor but pivotal character in The Spy Who Came in from the Cold, his third novel. Smiley is revealed to have come back into the service of the Circus as the top aide to Control, Maston's mysterious successor as the Circus' chief. It's revealed that, following the events of Call for the Dead, Smiley and Guillam succeeded in turning Mundt, the sole survivor of the spy ring, into a British double agent, and sent him back to East Germany. Fearing that Mundt's cover is about to be blown, Smiley and Control manipulate agent Alec Leamas into posing as a defector and sending him to Germany under the assumption that he is going to orchestrate Mundt's death. Along the way, Smiley learns that Leamas blew his own cover to his girlfriend, a nineteen-year-old communist sympathiser named Liz Gold, and arranges to incorporate her into the plot. Although Liz's unwitting role ultimately ensures the mission's success, it also results in her death, prompting a grief-stricken Leamas to give up and let himself be shot dead at the Berlin Wall as Smiley attempts to extricate him.

Smiley plays a small but pivotal role in The Looking Glass War, le Carré's fourth novel, occupying the "North European desk" at the Circus. He appears sporadically throughout the book as a liaison to The Department, a military intelligence agency, which attempts to surreptitiously conduct a dangerous and unnecessary operation without the Circus' knowledge. Smiley's appearance here is notable in that War is the only book of the series to depict his and Control's personal relationship in great detail. The climax of the novel bears witness to Smiley's ruthlessness, as he is dispatched by the Circus to end the Department's operation and force the abandonment of a Department employee to ameliorate the damage they have caused.

Smiley does not appear in either of le Carré's next two works, only one of which dealt with espionage.

=== Prior to the Karla trilogy ===
Several years pass between Smiley's appearance in The Looking Glass War, set circa 1964, and Tinker Tailor Soldier Spy, which takes place in 1973. During this period, Smiley's position in the Circus comes to be threatened by his contemporary Bill Haydon, proteges Toby Esterhase and Roy Bland, and ambitious newcomer Percy Alleline. Alleline develops a personal feud with Control due to the latter's class and ethnic prejudice against Percy's Scottish heritage, prompting factions to form within the Circus, with Control, Smiley, and Peter Guillam on one side and Alleline, Haydon, Esterhase, and Bland on the other. When Control is eased out of the Circus in late 1972 after the capture of agent Jim Prideaux in Czechoslovakia, Smiley too is forced out. The Circus is taken over by Alleline, with Haydon running "London Station", a branch overseeing all of the service's spy networks. Guillam remains in the Circus as Smiley's sole resource/ally, albeit in a greatly diminished position.

=== The Karla trilogy ===
In September or October 1973, the events of Tinker Tailor Soldier Spy take place, with Smiley successfully managing to expose Haydon as the long-term Soviet agent, or "mole", codenamed "Gerald" and reporting directly to Smiley's nemesis, Karla, head of Moscow Centre. Following the revelation, Alleline is drummed out of the Circus for his failure to identify Haydon himself and for permitting such a breach of national security to occur on his watch. Smiley is installed by Whitehall as the new head of the Circus and tasked with both tying up loose ends left by Haydon's treachery and launching a successful espionage mission to prove the organisation's viability.

The Honourable Schoolboy, set in 1974, finds Smiley having assembled a new team, made up of former colleague Connie Sachs; Doc di Salis, a Jesuit priest who is an expert on communist China; Guillam; and a rehabilitated Esterhase. After learning that Karla has been making exorbitant payments to a heretofore unknown Chinese source, Smiley tasks agent Jerry Westerby with going to Hong Kong disguised as a reporter and identifying the spy. Westerby identifies the man as Nelson Ko, the brother of prominent Triad member Drake Ko. However, he also falls in love with Drake's mistress Lizzie and attempts to betray the Circus as a result. Smiley's bodyguard, Fawn, assassinates Westerby, and then disappears from the Circus, presumably fired by Smiley. Concurrently, the CIA takes Nelson into custody, cutting off Circus access to him. The incident prompts Smiley's dismissal as Circus boss, with Guillam contemplating the possibility that Smiley permitted the CIA to succeed to get himself removed from the position.

Smiley's People, set in late 1977, finds a retired Smiley launching an investigation into the death of an elderly Estonian general, nationalist activist, and former Circus agent. A convoluted trail leads Smiley to discover that Karla has an illegitimate daughter whose existence he has gone to great lengths to hide, and who Karla smuggled through France and into Switzerland to receive desperately needed treatment for a severe case of schizophrenia. Smiley uses his knowledge of Karla's daughter to blackmail him into defecting, and in December 1977 Smiley greets Karla at the Berlin Wall as part of a contingent of Circus agents including Guillam and Esterhase. Karla is taken into British custody, with Esterhase congratulating Smiley on the accomplishment of a lifetime, though Smiley appears to reproach himself for the methods he used to achieve it.

In November of 2023, it was announced that Nick Harkaway would be writing a new George Smiley novel that takes place between the events of The Spy Who Came in from the Cold and Tinker Tailor Soldier Spy.

=== Smiley in retirement ===
Smiley was absent in the three le Carré novels of the 1980s. He re-surfaced for a penultimate time in 1990 when he appeared in The Secret Pilgrim, enjoying a happy retirement and in better spirits than his protege, the novel's narrator Ned, has ever seen him. Ned reveals that, shortly before the events of the book, he temporarily returned to the Circus to chair the "Fishing Rights Committee", a body set up to explore possible areas of co-operation between British and Russian intelligence services. The end of the book finds Smiley politely requesting that he never be brought out of retirement again, and departing for a vacation in Oceania.

In 2010, whilst giving a talk about his life and works at the Sheldonian Theatre in Oxford, le Carré responded to an audience question about what became of Smiley by responding that although he would like to think of him as a Sherlock Holmesian figure, never having really retired, the character would now be "very old and getting past it - certainly in his 90s". He envisaged Smiley to be "keeping bees somewhere" still alive, but very much retired.

The question was later answered definitively. Smiley appears in le Carré's 2017 novel A Legacy of Spies, set in 2014. At the end of the novel, which explores fallout from the events depicted in The Spy Who Came In from the Cold, Smiley meets with the novel's central character, Peter Guillam. The nonagenarian Smiley is now a resident of Freiburg, Germany, where he lives in a small apartment and conducts research at a library. The novel portrays him as still visited occasionally by his wife, Ann, and in touch with his old associate Jim Prideaux. Speaking with Guillam, he contends that his work had ultimately been for the benefit of Europe.

== Models ==
In 1995, le Carré said that the character of George Smiley was inspired by his one-time Lincoln College, Oxford tutor, the former Rev. Vivian Green—a renowned historian and author with an encyclopaedic knowledge. However, other than the thick glasses, loud clothes, and Green's habit of disappearing into a crowd, there were too many dissimilarities between the loquacious Green and the reticent Smiley to make this a clear match, and so other sources for Smiley continued to be named. It has been suggested that le Carré subconsciously took the name of his hero from special forces and intelligence officer Colonel David de Crespigny Smiley. More commonly, it was rumoured that Smiley was modelled on Sir Maurice Oldfield, a former head of British Intelligence, who physically resembled him. Le Carré denied the rumours, citing the fact that Oldfield and he were not contemporaries, although he and Alec Guinness did lunch with Oldfield while Guinness was researching the role, and Guinness adopted several of Oldfield's mannerisms of dress and behaviour for his performance. During the lunch, Oldfield denied to Guinness that he was the inspiration for Smiley, saying he was not like Smiley at all. In 1986, le Carré denied that Oldfield was the inspiration for Smiley, saying: "I never heard of Sir Maurice either by name or in any other way until long after the name and character of George Smiley were in print".

Oldfield himself believed that, although Green probably inspired le Carré, the character of Smiley was primarily based on John Bingham, 7th Baron Clanmorris, who had been le Carré's boss when he originally joined MI5 prior to his career in MI6. In 1999, le Carré confirmed that Bingham was also an inspiration for Smiley, and in 2000 went further, writing in an introduction to a reissue of one of Bingham's novels that "He had been one of two men who had gone into the making of George Smiley. Nobody who knew John and the work he was doing could have missed the description of Smiley in my first novel".

In an introductory essay dated March 1992, le Carré wrote:

And it is no surprise to me that, when I came to invent my leading character, George Smiley, I should give him something of Vivian Green's unlikely wisdom, wrapped in academic learning, and something of Bingham's devious resourcefulness and simple patriotism also. All fictional characters are amalgams; all spring from much deeper wells than their apparent counterparts in life. All in the end, like the poor suspects in my files, are refitted and remoulded in the writer's imagination, until they are probably closer to his own nature than to anybody else's. But now that Bingham is dead ... it seems only right that I should acknowledge my debt to him: not merely as a component of George Smiley, but as the man who first put the spark to my writing career.

== Novels ==
=== By John le Carré ===
- Call for the Dead (1961)
- A Murder of Quality (1962)
- The Spy Who Came in from the Cold (1963)
- The Looking Glass War (1965)
- Tinker Tailor Soldier Spy (1974)
- The Honourable Schoolboy (1977)
- Smiley's People (1979)
- The Secret Pilgrim (1990)
- A Legacy of Spies (2017)

=== By Nick Harkaway ===
- Karla's Choice (2024)
- The Taper Man (2026)

== In other media ==
=== Film ===
- Rupert Davies played Smiley as a minor although important character in the 1965 film adaptation The Spy Who Came in from the Cold.
- James Mason played Smiley (renamed Charles Dobbs) in The Deadly Affair, a 1966 film adaptation of Call for the Dead.
- Gary Oldman plays Smiley in the 2011 film adaptation of Tinker Tailor Soldier Spy. He was nominated for an Academy Award for Best Actor for his portrayal.

=== Television ===
- Alec Guinness portrayed Smiley in two highly successful BBC TV series: Tinker Tailor Soldier Spy (1979), and Smiley's People (1982). The middle story, The Honourable Schoolboy, was not filmed due to the cost of the Indochina setting. The Far Eastern parts of Tinker Tailor Soldier Spy had been relocated to Portugal for the same reason.
- Denholm Elliott played Smiley in a 1991 version of A Murder of Quality.
- Matthew Macfadyen will portray Smiley in a series titled Legacy of Spies, which will be an amalgamation of multiple books, it was announced in March 2025.

=== Radio ===
- George Cole played Smiley in BBC Radio versions of both Call for the Dead (1978) and A Murder of Quality (1981).
- Peter Vaughan played Smiley in a radio version of The Honourable Schoolboy (1983).
- Bernard Hepton, who played the part of Toby Esterhase in the BBC television series, played Smiley in the BBC Radio series of both Tinker Tailor Soldier Spy (1988) and Smiley's People (1990), with Charles Kay taking the part of Esterhase.
- Simon Russell Beale starred in a Radio 4 series titled The Complete Smiley, which dramatised all of the then published novels in the series, beginning on 23 May 2009 on BBC Radio 4 with Call for the Dead.

=== Stage ===
- John Ramm played Smiley in a theatrical adaptation of The Spy Who Came In From The Cold, debuting in 2024.
- A new production of the play is touring the UK as of 2026, with Tony Turner as Smiley.

=== Comics ===
- The 1988 graphic novel Shattered Visage, a sequel to the spy-fi TV series The Prisoner, Smiley is mentioned as having tutored a character in interrogation. (A number of other well-known fictional spies have cameo appearances.)
- Smiley appears as Harry Lime's assistant in Alan Moore's 2007 graphic novel The League of Extraordinary Gentlemen: Black Dossier.

== Parody ==
In the popular TV comedy series The Two Ronnies, Ronnie Barker played Smiley along the lines of Alec Guinness' portrayal in a sketch called Tinker Tailor Smiley Doyle. This was a joint send-up of Tinker Tailor Soldier Spy and The Professionals TV series, with Ronnie Corbett playing a bungling version of Martin Shaw's Doyle. Barker's Smiley provides the brains to the brawn of Corbett's Doyle and actually comes out the better. He is shown as something of an obsessive tea drinker. The sketch guest-starred Frank Williams from Dad's Army. The name of Smiley's enemy Karla can be seen on a secretary's computer screen.

A series of sketches in The Fast Show star John Thomson as a Smiley-like interrogator who finds it incredibly easy to prompt the interrogatee to reveal his crimes, usually simply by introducing himself.

Harry Enfield and Paul Whitehouse performed a sketch in 2012 about there being two George Smileys: a reference to the vastly different portrayals in the filmed versions of Tinker Tailor Soldier Spy.
