= Kika Markham =

British actress (born 1940)

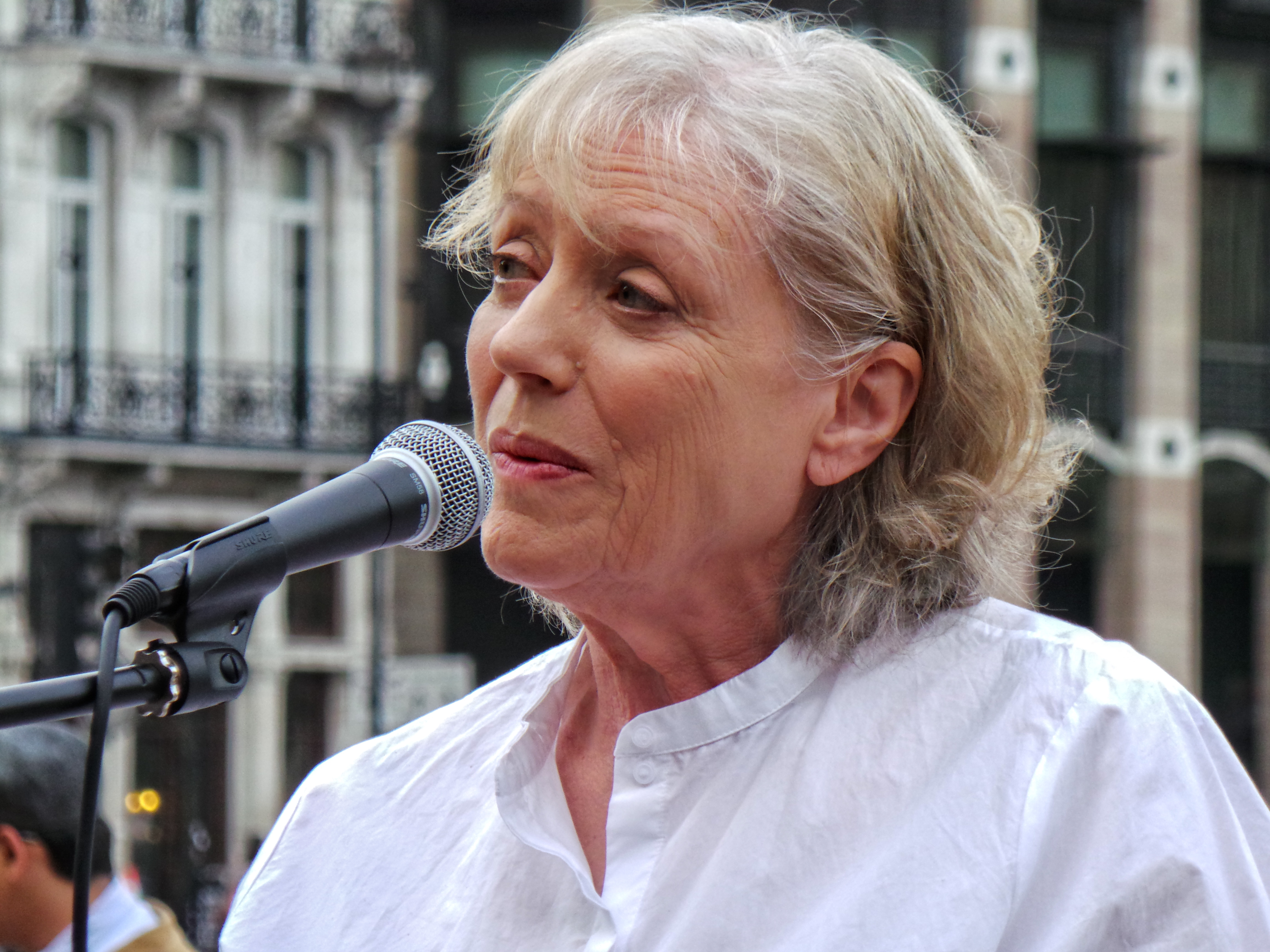
- Markham speaking at the No More War event in 2014
- Born: Erika S. L. Markham; 1940 (age 85–86); Macclesfield, Cheshire, England
- Occupation: Actress
- Years active: 1955–present
- Spouse: Corin Redgrave (m. 1985; died 2010)
- Children: 2
- Parent(s): David Markham; Olive Dehn
- Relatives: Petra Markham (sister); Jemma Redgrave (step-daughter)
- Family: Markham, Redgrave

Erika S.L. "Kika" Markham (born 1940) is an English actress.

== Early life ==
Markham is a daughter of actor David Markham (1913–1983),and writer Olive Dehn (1914–2007). She has three sisters, including Petra and Jehane Markham.

== Career ==
Markham has had a long career in the cinema, television and theatre as an actress. Among her television appearances are roles in Edward & Mrs. Simpson, The Life and Times of David Lloyd George, A Very British Coup, Van der Valk, The Line of Beauty, Minder, Cracker, Agatha Christie's Poirot (The Double Clue), Sherlock Holmes' Wisteria Lodge and Mr Selfridge. Her films include Bunny Lake Is Missing (1965), Futtocks End (1970), François Truffaut's Two English Girls (1971), Operation Daybreak (1975), Noroît (1976), The Blood of Hussain (1980), High Tide (1980), Outland (1981, as Sean Connery's wife), The Innocent (1985), Wonderland (1999), Esther Kahn (2000), Killing Me Softly (2002) and Franklyn (2008). In April 2020, she appeared in an episode of the BBC soap opera Doctors as Grace Wilson.

== Personal life ==
Markham married actor Corin Redgrave in Wandsworth, London, in 1985. The couple have two sons. Markham and Redgrave appeared together twice on screen: first in Lynda La Plante's Trial and Retribution (2000) as a judge and barrister, respectively; and later in the BBC's Waking The Dead (episode "Special Relationship: Part 1") as lovers suspected of the murder of a government advisor. They also appeared on stage together in an acclaimed revival of Noël Coward's A Song at Twilight, along with sister-in-law Vanessa Redgrave. Markham's memoir of her husband, Our Time of Day: My Life with Corin Redgrave, was published in 2014.
