= The Little Drummer Girl =

The Little Drummer Girl is a 1983 novel by John le Carré. It has been adapted into the following:

- The Little Drummer Girl (film), 1984, starring Diane Keaton
- The Little Drummer Girl (TV series), 2018 TV series
