= A Murder of Quality =

1962 novel by John le Carré

- First edition
- Author: John le Carré
- Language: English
- Series: George Smiley
- Genre: Mystery novel
- Publisher: Gollancz
- Publication date: 1962
- Publication place: United Kingdom
- Media type: Print (hardback and paperback)
- Pages: 189
- OCLC: 7699724

A Murder of Quality is the second novel by John le Carré, published in 1962. It features George Smiley, the most famous of le Carré's recurring characters, in his only book set outside the espionage community.

== Plot summary ==
In the early 1960s, having retired from Britain's intelligence service after World War II, Ailsa Brimley is now editor of a small Christian nonconformist magazine in London called Christian Voice. Many of its readers and their families have been supporters of the magazine since its inception. Brimley, who personally runs the magazine's advice column, receives a letter from a reader, Stella Rode, who claims that her husband, a public school junior master in the town of Carne, is plotting to kill her. Because Stella's family has been connected with the magazine for generations, Brimley takes the matter seriously. She approaches her former wartime colleague, retired intelligence officer George Smiley, and asks him to help. Smiley was a good friend of the late brother of Terence Fielding, now a senior master at the Carne School. Fielding must know Stella and her husband, so Smiley telephones him. He learns that Stella was found murdered in her home the previous night. Brimley, horrified that Stella's fears have come true, implores Smiley to go to Carne and look into the matter. Smiley agrees.

Smiley is introduced to Rigby, the local police detective in charge of the investigation. Rigby, learning of Smiley's connection to the school, welcomes his help in getting information from school personnel who have so far been reluctant to talk to the police. Stella was beaten to death in her home; her body found by her husband Stanley when he returned late at night from Fielding's house. The Rodes had been at Fielding's for a dinner party earlier that evening, and Stanley had forgotten his briefcase there. He had to go back to Fielding's to retrieve it because it contained exam papers which needed marking urgently. In his absence, Stella was murdered.

Footprints of large Wellington boots are found approaching the house in the snow, but none are found leaving it. The boot prints and the manner of the killing tell the police that the culprit was a tall, strong man, but Rigby's superior believes that the murder was perpetrated by a homeless madwoman, Janie Lyn, whom Stella had befriended. The apparent murder weapon, a piece of thick electrical cable, is found in a ditch four miles away, stained with blood and Stella's hair. This electrical cable had been used by Stanley several weeks earlier in a science lesson, but he could not have abandoned it in four miles away because he had been under observation the whole time.

Presenting himself as a representative of Brimley's magazine who is writing Stella's obituary, Smiley talks to some of the Carne School faculty and to others in the town who knew the Rodes. Smiley finds a class division between "town and gown" at Carne, as well as religious hostility between adherents of the Church of England among the Carne faculty and Nonconformists like Stella. None of this however seems to provide a credible motive for murder.

While walking back to his hotel from the Rodes' house, he is startled by the appearance of Janie. She tells him that she witnessed the Devil flying on "silver wings" at the time of the murder. The police eventually find her squatting in an abandoned village church, with some beads she took from the body, and they arrest her for the crime.

The examination of the murder scene has told the police that the murderer must have been "covered in blood" and used leather gloves. Smiley learns that Stella had volunteered to collect secondhand clothing for a refugee charity in London. At his request, Brimley goes to the charity's headquarters to examine parcels of clothing sent there from Carne. In one such parcel she finds clothing stained with blood, including a plastic raincoat (the "silver wings" described by Janie), the gloves, and the boots. The killer put the items into one of the parcels that were sent on to the charity.

Another key piece of evidence seems to be Stanley's briefcase containing the exam papers, left unattended for a time at Fielding's house on the night of the murder. When Tim Perkins, a boy in Fielding's school house, achieves a suspiciously high score on the exam, it looks as though he may have cheated by examining the contents of the briefcase before Stanley retrieved it later that night. Perkins is killed in a bicycle accident. Smiley visits Fielding, who appears devastated by the death of Tim Perkins. Smiley was already aware that Fielding was to retire at the end of the current school term. Fielding tells Smiley that he will have to get another job since he will not receive a pension like other retired masters — he was considered a "temporary" master at the school due to a criminal conviction for homosexual acts dating from many years earlier. Fielding tells Smiley that Perkins didn't cheat on the exam, but that he cheated for the boy, who was in danger of losing his place at the school due to his poor academic performance. Fielding himself, he claims, altered the boy's exam paper so that he would get a higher grade. He also says that he saw in Stanley's briefcase the piece of heavy electrical cable, that police believe was the murder weapon.

Smiley returns to London, only to find that Stanley has gone there to see him and Brimley. Stanley reveals that Stella was a pathological liar and a sadist, who delighted in obtaining damaging information about the backgrounds of people at Carne and using the threat of revealing it to torment them.

Later that week Smiley hosts Fielding, who is in London to interview for a job, for dinner at his home. He reveals he has found that Fielding's story about the briefcase is a lie — police examination of Perkins' exam paper shows that everything was written in Perkins' own hand. This means that Fielding was attempting to frame Stanley and is himself the killer of both Stella and Perkins. Fielding was one of the people Stella was blackmailing. She had learned of Fielding's conviction and was threatening to disclose the information to make it impossible for Fielding to get another position. Fielding had planted the apparent murder weapon in advance, and had disposed of the real weapon. Perkins had to die because he had cheated for himself on the exam, meaning that he had seen the contents of the briefcase the night of Stella's murder and could expose Fielding's attempt to frame Stanley. By prearrangement with Smiley, Rigby and his men arrive to arrest Fielding. Beseeching Smiley to intervene and save him, Fielding is taken away as Smiley looks sadly after him.

== Characters in A Murder of Quality ==
- George Smiley – a retired intelligence officer
- Ailsa Brimley – The editor of magazine Christian Voice.
- Stella Rode – A long time subscriber to Christian Voice.
- Stanley Rode – A grammar-school educated teacher at Carne school. Stella Rode's husband.
- Terence Fielding – A history teacher at Carne school.
- Janie Lyn – A homeless woman.
- Tim Perkins – Head boy in Fielding's House.
- Miss Truebody – Housekeeper to Terence Fielding.
- Inspector Rigby – A local police officer investigating the murder.

== Television and radio adaptations ==
John le Carré himself adapted the novel for Thames Television. A Murder of Quality was shown on the ITV network in 1991. It stars Denholm Elliott as George Smiley, Glenda Jackson as Ailsa Brimley, Joss Ackland as Terence Fielding, Billie Whitelaw as Mad Janie, David Threlfall as Stanley Rode and a teenage Christian Bale as Tim Perkins.

The novel was read on BBC Radio 4's Story Time in 1976, and dramatised on the same station in 1981, starring George Cole as George Smiley. The 1981 dramatisation contained a seemingly anachronistic reference to “Vietnamese boat people”. Certainly, nothing in the attitudes on display suggest any attempt to set the story any later than 1962.

More recently, in 2009, BBC Radio 4 broadcast A Murder of Quality as the second in a series which featured all the Smiley novels (The Complete Smiley), with Simon Russell Beale in the main role.
