= Daily Mail National Film Awards =

National Film Awards
- Awarded for: Highest award for most outstanding British film and actor and actress in films.
- Country: United Kingdom
- Presented by: Lord and Lady Rothermere
- First award: 1946; 80 years ago
- Final award: 1951; 75 years ago

The National Film Awards (also known as the Daily Mail National Film Awards, Daily Mail Film Awards, British Film Oscars, Britain's Oscars, and Silver Star) were the first ever national film awards held in Britain. They were sponsored by the Daily Mail newspaper with readers voting at cinemas across the country, for Best Actor, Actress, and Film. The inaugural event was held at the Dorchester Hotel, London in 1946.

The first awards were awarded to James Mason and Margaret Lockwood for most outstanding British actor and actress during the war years.

The award is seen as the predecessor to the British Academy Film Awards (also known as the BAFTA Film Awards) which, although it began in 1947, did not give Best Actor/Actress awards until 1952 and the inspiration behind the National Film Awards UK which is voted on by movie fans and commenced its award ceremonies since 2015.

== Awards ==
The awards ran from 1946 to 1951. It was always held at the Dorchester Hotel in London and was hosted by Lord and Lady Rothermere. It was held in conjunction with the Daily Mail National Film Festival held in Leicester Square, London. The trophy was a silver nymph holding aloft a silver star in its right hand, designed by Juliet Brothers, a schoolmistress from Southport. She won the Daily Mail competition for Best Design. The circular base was inscribed with the winners' details. The trophy stands approximately 60 cm high. In

=== Categories (as voted by the public) ===
- National Film Award for Most popular and outstanding British actor during the war years (1946 only)
- National Film Award for Most popular and outstanding British actress during the war years (1946 only)
- National Film Award for Best Film (1946–1951)
- National Film Award for Best Film Actor of the Year (1947–1951)
- National Film Award for Best Film Actress of the Year (1947–1951)

== Winners ==
=== 1946 ===
- Most popular and outstanding British actor during the war years – James Mason.
- Most Outstanding British actress during the war years – Margaret Lockwood.
- Best Film – Way to the Stars. Collected by Anatole de Grunwald (Producer) and Anthony Asquith (Director)

This inaugural event was the first national film award held in the UK.

=== 1947 ===
- Best Film Actor of the year – James Mason. (Mr. J Arthur Rank Collected the award on his behalf as he was in New York at the time)
- Best Film Actress of the year – Margaret Lockwood.
- Best Film – Piccadilly Incident. Collected by Herbert Wilcox (Producer & Director)

Over 2.2 million members of the public voted during the contest.

=== 1948 ===
- Best Film Actor of the year – John Mills for his role in Great Expectations
- Best Film Actress of the year – Margaret Lockwood for her role in Jassy.
- Best Film – The Courtneys of Curzon Street. Collected by Herbert Wilcox (Producer & Director)

=== 1949 ===
- Best Film Actor of the year – Michael Wilding.
- Best Film Actress of the year – Anna Neagle.
- Best Film – Spring in Park Lane. Collected by Herbert Wilcox (Producer & Director)

=== 1950 ===
- Most popular and outstanding British actor of the year – Richard Todd.
- Most Outstanding British actress of the year – Jean Simmons.
- Best Film – The Hasty Heart.

=== 1951 ===
- Most popular and outstanding British actor of the year – John Mills.
- Most Outstanding British actress of the year – Anna Neagle.
- Best Film – Odette. Collected by Herbert Wilcox (Producer & Director)

== See also ==
- British Academy of Film and Television Arts
- British Academy Film Awards
- National Film Awards UK
- National Film Academy
- National Reality Television Awards
- BAFTA Academy Fellowship Award
- Albert Sustainable Production Certification
