= Point of Return (television play) =

Point of Return is a British television play by M.B. Kingsland. Written for television, it originally aired on British television in 1957 and was produced on Australian television in 1958. It was Kingsland's first script.

== Premise ==
In an RAF control tower, a ghost plane drones overhead from 1917. A 30-year-old message is dropped on the runaway, giving a bearing for a party of survivors from a plane crash. This is heard by a Flight lieutenant who decides to initiate a search for survivors. He fights a court-martial, but in the end, he is vindicated when the mist clears, and they can see a dinghy with survivors.

== 1957 BBC Production ==
The play was performed on British TV on 12 September 1957.

The Daily Telegraph said "suspense was kept going nicely". The Liverpool Echo said "the play was neatly written and the three-man cast was convincing. But the plot! No thank you."

The play was also performed on radio in 1958.

=== Cast ===
- Eric Lander as Flt.-Lt. Upwood
- Glyn Houston as Sgt. Shaw
- Bryan Coleman as C.O.

== 1958 Australian Production ==
The play was filmed for ABC television in its Sydney studios and aired on 15 January 1958. It was directed by Royston Morley. Sets were by Jack Montgomery.

=== Cast ===
- James Condon
- Frank Taylor
- Geoffrey King
