= Edith Carter =

British actress

Edith Carter (died 14 June 1934) was an English stage actress and playwright, who was active in the 1920s-30s. She was the sister of the novelist John L. Carter, the aunt of the mystery and detective novel author Emery Bonett and the sister-in-law of author and playwright Winifred Carter.

Plays

- Treasures in Heaven 1912
- Lass o' Laughter (cowritten with Nan Marriott-Watson) 1922 – Queen's Theatre
- Educating a Husband 1923 – Southend Rep Theatre
- Certified Imam 1924 – Theatre Royal, Castleford
- Uncle Hiram Here (cowritten with Florence Bates) 1925 – "Q" Theatre
- The Lovely Liar 1927
- The Two Mrs. Camerons. A Play in Three Acts (cowritten with Winifred Carter) – Q Theatre, London and Townley Street Sunday School by the CS Players, January 1945; published 1936/1937 (US)
- Wanted-a Wife. A Play in Three Acts (cowritten with Winifred Carter) – Q Theatre, London; published 1936/1937 (US) (possibly originally published 1922 or 1926)
- From Duckling to Swan: Woman Can Be Beautiful 1948

== John L. Carter ==
Edith Carter's brother, John Louis Justin Carter (b. Eccleshall, Sheffield 1880-d. West Byfleet, Surrey 9 February 1959), was also an author and playwright, who wrote under several pseudonyms. He adapted at least one of her plays into a novel.

Known works

- Peggy the Aeronaut 1910 – as J. L. J. Carter
- Nymphet – 1915 as Compton Irving Carter
- Come Day, Go Day 1922 – as John L. Carter
- Educating a Husband: From the Play of that Name by Edith Carter 1926 – as Compton Irving Carter
- White Sheikh. A Novel 1935 – as Compton Irving
- His Lady Secretary. A Comedy in Three Acts 1938 – as Compton Irving
- Daughter of Egypt 1937 – as Compton Irving
- Wings to the Peacock 1939 – as Compton Irving noy
