= Laura Cowie =

Scottish silent film actress (1892–1969)

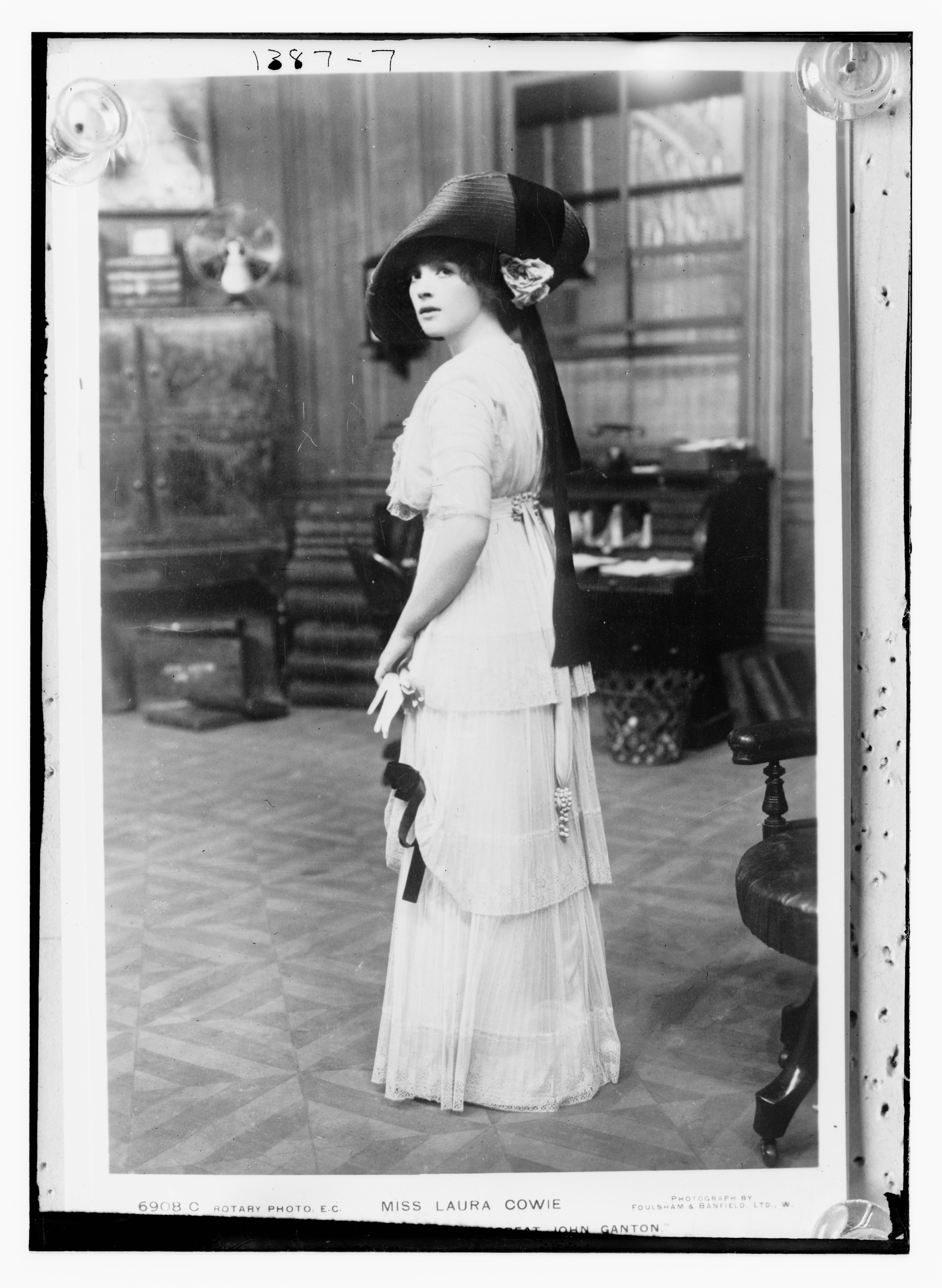
Laura Cowie

Laura Cowie (7 April 1892 – 11 February 1969) was a Scottish actress.

== Early life ==
Cowie was born on 7 April 1892 in Milltown of Rothiemay, Banffshire, Scotland. She was the daughter of farmer Alexander Cowie and his wife Anna Hutcheon. After her parents had married in 1889, they took up a lease on Turtory farm near Marnoch. In 1893, Laura's older brother Alexander was born. When the father died in 1900, following a sudden heart attack, the remaining family moved to Aberdeen, where they lived with two of Laura's cousins and earned some money by taking in two female students as boarders. Cowie went to school in Aberdeen.

In 1902, her mother married her second husband, the elderly Alexander Reid Craib, the Minister of the parish of New Pitsligo. He was 61 at the time.

As a young girl, Cowie wished to become a professional dancer. She was already taking dancing lessons at a local institute in Aberdeen. Both her mother and her step-father decided that she was indeed talented and needed proper training. So Anna took her daughter as well as her son Alexander to London, where Cowie gained a place at the Academy of Dramatic Arts (later RADA) which had been founded in 1904.

== Career ==
The academy's founder, theatre director Herbert Beerbohm Tree, saw great potential in Cowie, but convinced her that she would make a better actress than a dancer. While the young woman embarked on her career, she was chaperoned by her mother, who had decided to stay in London, opening up an agency for housemaids. While Anna Cowie took a flat in Hampstead, Cowie shared an apartment in Great Smith Street with her brother Alexander, who had found a good job in the automobile industry.

After appearing in various stage productions, Laura's first role in a film was in William Barker's Henry VIII (1911). She would later play major parts in Anne de Boleyn (1914) and Queens of France (1938). Laura Cowie played alongside famous actors like John Gielgud, Alec Guinness, Mrs Patrick Campbell or George Fawcett. In 1934 she starred as Katherine Parr in Winifred Carter's The Queen Who Kept Her Head.

On 20 June 1918 she married scriptwriter and director John Hastings Turner. After the marriage, she mostly retired and only occasionally appeared in film productions by the Rank studios.

== Final years and death ==
In 1939, both Laura's mother and her brother died, the latter leaving behind a wife and a young son.

After their marriage Hastings Turner and Cowie bought Blue Tile Farm in Fakenham, Norfolk. Here Turner wrote many of his scripts and novels, and here he died in 1956. Cowie died on 11 February 1969 in the small coastal town of Wells-next-the-Sea, Norfolk, England.
