= John Coulson =

John Coulson may refer to:

- John Coulson (chemical engineer) (1910–1990), British chemical engineering academic
- John Coulson (diplomat) (1909–1997), British diplomat
- John Bonett, pen name of John Hubert Arthur Coulson (1906–1989), English writer
- John Coulson Kernahan (1858–1943), English novelist

== See also ==
- John Coulson Tregarthen (1854–1933), Cornish field naturalist and author
