= The Queen Who Kept Her Head =

1934 historical play by the British writer Winifred Carter

- Original language: English
- Written by: Winifred Carter
- Genre: Historical
- Setting: England, 1540s

Premiere
- Date: 20 February 1934
- Place: Kingsway Theatre, London

The Queen Who Kept Her Head is a 1934 historical play by the British writer Winifred Carter. It is based on the life of Katharine Parr, the sixth and final wife of Henry VIII, who outlived him.

It ran for twenty two performances at the Kingsway Theatre in London West End. The play featured Laura Cowie as Katharine with Raymond Lovell as King Henry. The cast also included Bernard Lee as Sir Thomas Seymour, Felicity Carter and Aubrey Mallalieu, and G. H. Mulcaster as Sir Anthony Knevet.

The play text was published in 1938.

== Bibliography ==
- Wearing, J. P. The London Stage: 1930-1939. Rowman & Littlefield, 2014.
