= Alasdair and Hetty Tayler =

Alexander Norwich Tayler (11 July 1870 – 8 November 1937) and his sister Helen Agnes Henrietta Tayler (24 March 1869 – 10 April 1951) were British historical writers, specialising in 17th and 18th century Scottish and English history.

Helen Agnes Henrietta Tayler, known as Hetty Tayler was born in London. Her brother Alexander, known as Alasdair Tayler was born 16 months later at the family summer home in Rothiemay, Banffshire, Scotland. Their parents, William James Tayler and Georgina Lucy Duff, were descended from noble multi-generational Scottish and English families, whose long aristocratic histories provided much material for the two future historians in their formative years.

Among the books under the joint authorship of Alasdair and Hetty Tayler were:

- Alasdair and Hetty Tayler (1914). The Book of the Duffs. William Brown.,
- Alasdair and Hetty Tayler (1928). Jacobites of Aberdeenshire and Banffshire in the 45. Milne & Hutcheon, Aberdeen.,
- Alasdair and Hetty Tayler (1933). The Ogilvies of Boyne. Aberdeen University Press.,
- Alasdair and Hetty Tayler (1934). Jacobites of Aberdeenshire and Banffshire in the Rising of 1715. Oliver & Boyd, Edinburgh and London. - about Charles, Lord Fraser of Muchalls, William Fraser of Inverallochy, Captain Simon Fraser and the Hon. James Fraser of Lonmay,
- Alasdair and Hetty Tayler (1939). John Graham of Claverhouse. Duckworth, London.
- Alasdair and Hetty Tayler (1937). The House of Forbes. 3rd Spalding Club, Aberdeen. ISBN 0-912951-29-X and Scotpress 1987.

Neither Hetty nor Alasdair ever married. Following Alasdair's death in London at the age of 67, Hetty wrote additional historical works, including:

- Henrietta Tayler (1937). The Child Sovereigns of Scotland. T & A Constable.
- Hetty Tayler (1946). History of the Family of Urquhart. Aberdeen University Press. and
- Hetty Tayler (1949). Bonnie Prince Charlie. Thomas Nelson..

Hetty Tayler died in London at the age of 82.

Another writer in the family, John Hubert Arthur Coulson, the son of Hetty and Alasdair's sister, Constance, who wrote under the pseudonym John Bonett, became a well-known author of detective fiction.
