= Children Galore =

1955 film by Terence Fisher

- Directed by: Terence Fisher
- Written by: John Bonnet; Emery Bonnet; Peter Plaskett
- Produced by: Henry Passmore
- Starring: Eddie Byrne; June Thorburn; Betty Ann Davies
- Cinematography: Jonah Jones
- Edited by: Inman Hunter
- Production company: Grendon Films
- Distributed by: General Film Distributors (UK)
- Release date: February 1955 (UK)
- Running time: 60 minutes
- Country: United Kingdom
- Language: English

Children Galore is a 1955 British comedy film directed by Terence Fisher and starring Eddie Byrne and June Thorburn. It was written by John Bonnet, Emery Bonnet and Peter Plaskett.

== Plot ==
A village squire offers to give away a cottage to a deserving family with the most grandchildren.

== Cast ==
- Eddie Byrne as Zacky Jones
- June Thorburn as Milly Ark
- Betty Ann Davies as Mrs. Ark
- Richard Leech as Harry Bunnion
- Marjorie Rhodes as Ada Jones
- Jack McNaughton as Pat Ark
- Violet Gould as Mrs. Bunnion
- Henry Caine as Bert Bunnion
- Evan Thomas as Lord Redscarfe
- Marjorie Hume as Lady Redscarfe
- Lucy Griffiths as Miss Prescott
- Olive Milbourne as Miss Finch
- Grace Arnold as Mrs. Gedge
- Anna Turner as Louise
- John Peters as plumber
- John Lothar as postman
- Jack Hartman as mate
- David Ludlow as boy

== Critical reception ==
The Monthly Film Bulletin wrote: "The simple rustic humours exploited here prove alogether too simple, and the result is a cheerless and rather tasteless little comedy. A number of character players, affecting a number of rural accents, go down fighting."

In British Sound Films: The Studio Years 1928–1959 David Quinlan rated the film as "mediocre", writing: "Group-3 style comedy has neither depth nor taste; the cast works hard."

In the Radio Times, David Parkinson rated the film two out of five stars, calling it "Fun in a very English sort of way, this programme filler has the advantage of being short and to the point."
