= British Academy of Film and Television Arts =

Independent trade association and charity

- Abbreviation: BAFTA
- Formation: 16 April 1947; 79 years ago (as British Film Academy)
- Type: Trade association
- Purpose: Supporting, promotes and developing the art of film, television and video games
- Headquarters: Piccadilly; London, W1J; United Kingdom
- Region served: United Kingdom
- Members: Approximately 13,500
- Official language: English
- President: The Prince of Wales (since 2010)
- Chairman: Hilary Rosen
- Chief executive: Jane Millichip
- Website: bafta.org

The British Academy of Film and Television Arts (BAFTA, /ˈbæftə/) is an independent trade association and charity that supports, develops, and promotes the arts of film, television and video games (the art forms of the moving image) in the United Kingdom. In addition to its annual award ceremonies, BAFTA has an international programme of learning events and initiatives offering access to talent through workshops, masterclasses, scholarships, lectures, and mentoring schemes in the United Kingdom.

BAFTA's annual film awards ceremony, the British Academy Film Awards, has been held since 1949, while its annual television awards ceremony, the British Academy Television Awards, has been held since 1955. Their third ceremony, the British Academy Games Awards, was first presented in 2004.

== Origins ==
BAFTA started out as the British Film Academy. On 16 April 1947, David Lean chaired a meeting at the Hilton London Hyde Park to discuss creating a UK film organisation and on 11 November 1947 a group of directors (Lean, Alexander Korda, Roger Manvell, Laurence Olivier, Emeric Pressburger, Michael Powell, Michael Balcon, Carol Reed) and other major figures of the British film industry formed a temporary committee to draft the constitution of the Academy. Lean was the founding chairman.

The first Film Awards ceremony took place in May 1949, honouring the films The Best Years of Our Lives, Odd Man Out and The World Is Rich.

The Guild of Television Producers and Directors was set up in 1953 with the first awards ceremony in October 1954, and in 1958 merged with the British Film Academy to form the Society of Film and Television Arts, whose inaugural meeting was held at Buckingham Palace and presided over by the Duke of Edinburgh.

== 195 Piccadilly ==
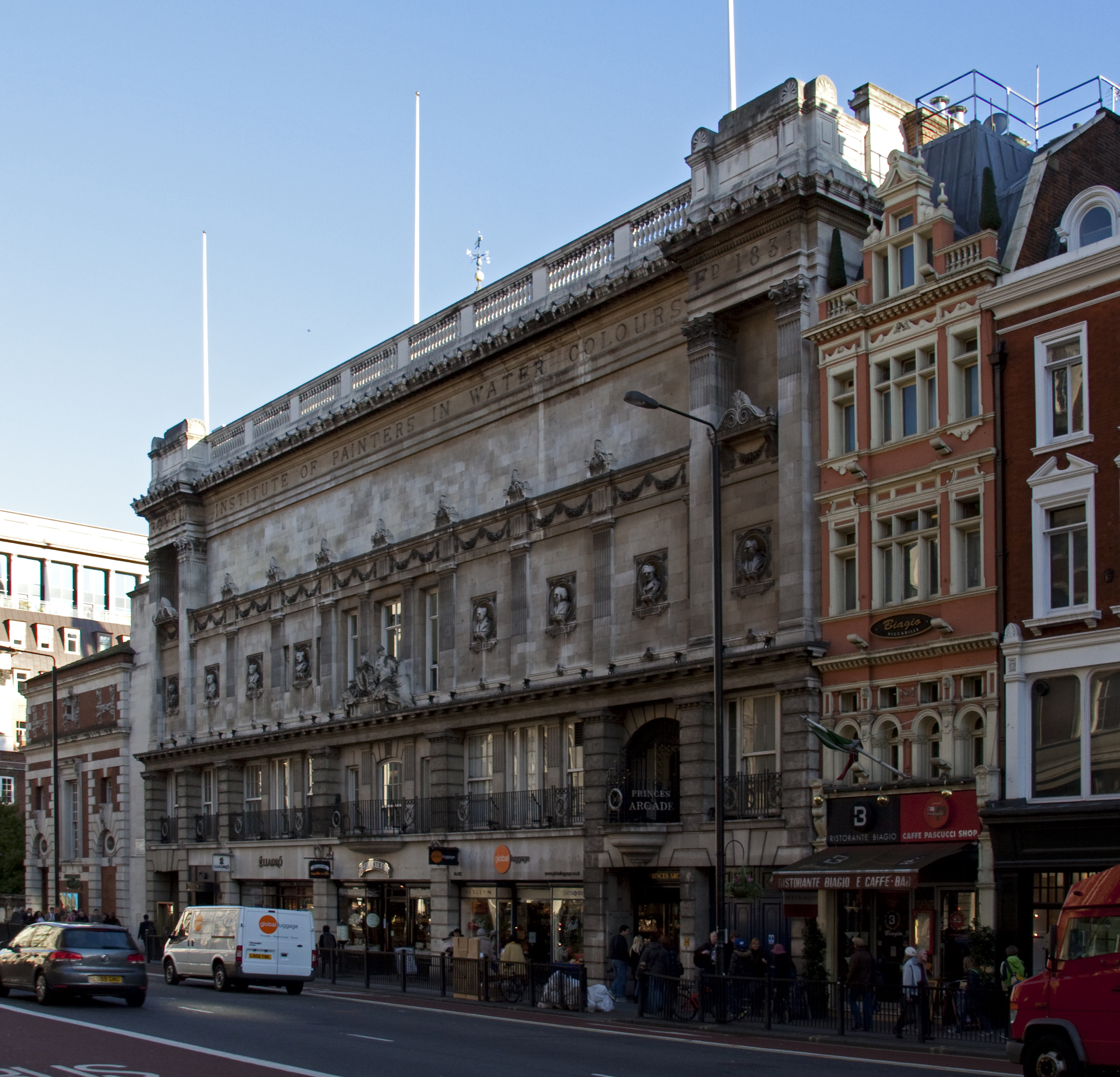
195 Piccadilly in 2010

The Society of Film and Television Arts acquired the historic Prince's Hall facilities at 195 Piccadilly, following the Royal Institute of Painters in Water Colours' move to the Mall Galleries. Queen Elizabeth, The Duke of Edinburgh, The Princess Royal and The Earl Mountbatten of Burma opened the organisation's headquarters in 1976, and it became the British Academy of Film and Television Arts in March 1976.

In 2016 BAFTA embarked on an extensive renovation of the Grade II listed property. Benedetti Architects oversaw a £33M+ remodel, doubling its original capacity with an additional floor, raising and restoring two large Victorian rooflight structures and decorative plasterwork, creating an entire floor devoted to BAFTA's learning and new talent programmes, and revamping the property's food, beverage, and events operations in order to maximize revenue to sustain property maintenance and operations. The new facilities were reopened in 2022.

== Organisational structure ==
BAFTA is a membership organisation comprising approximately 8,000 individuals worldwide who are creatives and professionals working in and making a contribution to the film, television and games industries in the UK. In 2005, it placed an overall cap on worldwide voting membership which stood at approximately 6,500 as of 2017.

BAFTA does not receive any funding from the government; it relies on income from membership subscriptions, individual donations, trusts, foundations and corporate partnerships to support its ongoing outreach work.

BAFTA has offices in Scotland and Wales in the UK, in Los Angeles and New York in the US and runs events in Hong Kong and mainland China.

Amanda Berry was chief executive from December 2000 to October 2022. Jane Millichip has held the position since October 2022.

Krishnendu Majumdar served a term as chair during 2020–2023, and was succeeded by Sarah Putt in 2023. Following Putt's term, Hilary Rosen was promoted to chair in 2026.

== Initiatives ==
In addition to its high-profile awards ceremonies, BAFTA manages a year-round programme of educational events and initiatives including film screenings and Q&As, tribute evenings, interviews, lectures, and debates with major industry figures

=== Scholarships ===
BAFTA runs a number of scholarship programmes across the UK, United States and Asia.

Launched in 2012, the UK programme enables talented British citizens who are in need of financial support to take an industry-recognised course in film, television or games in the UK. Each BAFTA Scholar receives up to £12,000 towards their annual course fees, and mentoring support from a BAFTA member and free access to BAFTA events around the UK. Since 2013, three students every year have received one of the Prince William Scholarships in Film, Television and Games, supported by BAFTA and Warner Bros. These scholarships are awarded in the name of Prince William, Duke of Cambridge in his role as president of BAFTA.

In the U.S., BAFTA Los Angeles offers financial support and mentorship to British graduate students studying in the US, as well as scholarships to provide financial aid to local LA students from the inner city. BAFTA New York's Media Studies Scholarship Program, set up in 2012, supports students pursuing media studies at undergraduate and graduate level institutions within the New York City area and includes financial aid and mentoring opportunities.

Since 2015, BAFTA has been offering scholarships for British citizens to study in China, and vice versa.

=== Albert ===
In 2011 BAFTA founded the organisation Albert, which promotes sustainable film and television production through its carbon footprint calculator and certification. All BBC, ITV, Channel 4, UKTV, Sky and Netflix productions in the UK are required to register their carbon footprint using the Albert carbon calculator, and the BBC requires all television commissions to be Albert certified.

== Awards ==
BAFTA presents awards for film, television and games, including children's entertainment, at a number of annual ceremonies across the UK and in Los Angeles.

=== BAFTA awards ===
The BAFTA award, designed by Mitzi Cunliffe

The BAFTA award trophy is a mask, designed by American sculptor Mitzi Cunliffe. When the Guild merged with the British Film Academy to become the Society of Film and Television Arts, later the British Academy of Film and Television Arts, the first "BAFTA award" was presented to Sir Charles Chaplin on his Academy Fellowship that year.

A BAFTA award – including the bronze mask and marble base – weighs 3.7 kg (8.2 lb) and measures 27 cm (11 in) high × 14 cm (5.5 in) wide × 8 cm (3.1 in) deep; the mask itself measures 16 cm (6.3 in) high × 14 cm (5.5 in) wide. They are made of phosphor bronze and cast in a Middlesex foundry.

In 2017, the British Academy of Film and Television Arts introduced new entry rules for British films starting from the 2018/19 season to foster diversity.

=== Awards ceremonies ===
==== Film Awards ====
BAFTA's annual film awards ceremony is known as the British Academy Film Awards, or "the BAFTAs", and reward the best work of any nationality seen on British cinema screens during the preceding year. In 1949 the British Film Academy, as it was then known, presented the first awards for films made in 1947 and 1948. Since 2008 the ceremony has been held at the Royal Opera House in London's Covent Garden. It had been held in the Odeon cinema on Leicester Square since 2000.

Since 2017, the BAFTA ceremony has been held at the Royal Albert Hall. The ceremony had been performed during April or May of each year, but beginning 2002 it has been held in February to precede the Academy Awards (Oscars) in the United States, making the BAFTA Film Awards a major precursor of the eventual annual results of the Oscar ceremonies since.

In order for a film to be considered for a BAFTA nomination, its first public exhibition must be displayed in a cinema and it must have a UK theatrical release for no fewer than seven days of the calendar year that corresponds to the upcoming awards. A movie must be of feature-length and movies from all countries are eligible in all categories, with the exception of the Alexander Korda Award for Outstanding British Film and Outstanding Debut which are for British films or individuals only.

==== Television Awards and Television Craft Awards ====
The British Academy Television Awards ceremony usually takes place during April or May, with its sister ceremony, the British Academy Television Craft Awards, usually occurring within a few weeks of it.

The Television Awards, celebrating the best TV programmes and performances of the past year, are also often referred to simply as "the BAFTAs" or, to differentiate them from the movie awards, the "BAFTA Television Awards". They have been awarded annually since 1954. The first ever ceremony consisted of six categories. Until 1958, they were awarded by the Guild of Television Producers and Directors.

From 1968 until 1997, BAFTA's Film and Television Awards were presented together, but from 1998 onwards they were presented at two separate ceremonies.

The Television Craft Awards celebrate the talent behind the programmes, such as individuals working in visual effects, production, and costume design.

Only British programmes are eligible – with the potential exception of the publicly voted Audience Award – but any cable, satellite, terrestrial or digital television stations broadcasting in the UK are eligible to submit entries, as are independent production companies who have produced programming for the channels. Individual performances can either be entered by the performers themselves or by the broadcasters. The programmes being entered must have been broadcast on or between 1 January and 31 December of the year preceding the awards ceremony.

Since 2014 the "BAFTA Television Awards" have been open to TV programmes which are only broadcast online.

==== Games Awards ====
The British Academy Games Awards ceremony traditionally takes place in March, shortly after the Film Awards ceremony in February.

BAFTA first recognised video games and other interactive media at its inaugural BAFTA Interactive Entertainment Awards ceremony during 1998, the first major change of its rules since the admittance of television thirty years earlier. Among the first winning games were GoldenEye 007, Gran Turismo and interactive comedy MindGym, sharing the spotlight with the BBC News Online website which won the news category four years consecutively. These awards allowed the academy to recognise new forms of entertainment that were engaging new audiences and challenging traditional expressions of creativity.

During 2003, the sheer ubiquity of interactive forms of entertainment and the breadth of genres and types of video games outgrew the combined ceremony, and the event was divided into the BAFTA Video Games Awards and the BAFTA Interactive Awards. Despite making headlines with high-profile winners like Halo 2 and Half-Life 2 the interactive division was discontinued and disappeared from BAFTA's publicity material after only two ceremonies.

During 2006, BAFTA announced its decision "to give video games equal status with film and television", and the academy now advertises video games as its third major topic in recognition of its importance as an art form of moving images. The same year the ceremony was performed at The Roundhouse by Chalk Farm Road in North London on 5 October and was televised for the first time on 17 October and was broadcast on the digital channel E4.

Between 2009 and 2019, the ceremonies have been performed at the London Hilton Park Lane and Tobacco Dock, and have been hosted by Dara Ó Briain and Rufus Hound. In 2020, as a result of the COVID-19 pandemic, it was announced that the ceremony was changing format from a live red-carpet ceremony at the Queen Elizabeth Hall in London to an online show. The online show was presented by Dara Ó Briain from his home and was watched by 720,000 globally. In 2021 the 17th British Academy Games Awards was hosted by arts and entertainment presenter Elle Osili-Wood and was watched by a global audience of 1.5 million.

==== Children's Awards ====
The British Academy Children's Awards are presented annually during November to reward excellence in the art forms of the moving image intended for children. They have been awarded annually since 1996 except for 2020 and 2021 due to the COVID-19 pandemic.

The academy has a history of recognising and rewarding children's programming, presenting two awards at the 1969 ceremony – The Flame of Knowledge Award for Schools Programmes and the Harlequin Award for Children's Programmes.

As of 2010 the Awards ceremony includes 19 categories across movies, television, video games and online content.

Since 2007 the Children's Awards have included a Kids Vote award, voted by children between seven and 14. The CBBC Me and My Movie award, a children's filmmaking initiative to inspire and enable children to make their own movies and tell their own stories, has been discontinued.

==== BAFTA Student Film Awards ====
BAFTA also hosts the annual BAFTA Student Film Awards as showcase for rising industry talent. The animation award was sponsored in 2017 and 2018 by animation studio Laika.

==== BAFTA Young Game Designer Awards ====
The Young Game Designer (YGD) awards are an initiative to recognise and encourage young talent in the games industry. Founded in 2010 originally for ages 11-16, it expanded to include two awards across two age categories: game making for 10-14 and 14-18; and game concept for 10-14 and 14-18. It has been hosted by Inel Tomlinson in 2024 and 2025, and Jules Harding in 2026.

== Presidents and vice-presidents ==
Presidents

1. The Duke of Edinburgh (1959–1965)
2. The Earl Mountbatten of Burma (1966–1972)
3. The Princess Royal (1973–2001)
4. The Lord Attenborough (2001–2010)
5. The Prince of Wales (2010–present)

Vice-presidents

1. The Lord Attenborough (1973–1995)
2. The Lord Puttnam (1995–2004)
3. Michael Grade (2004–2010)
4. Duncan Kenworthy (film) (2009–2015)
5. Sophie Turner Laing (television) (2010–2015)
6. Greg Dyke (television) (2016–present)

== Royal connections ==
William, Prince of Wales has been the President of the Academy since February 2010.

The Prince's appointment follows a long tradition of royal involvement with the academy. Prince Philip, Duke of Edinburgh, was the first president of the Society of Film and Television Arts (SFTA) in 1959 to 1965, followed by Earl Mountbatten of Burma and the Princess Royal, who was its president from 1972 to 2001. It was the Queen and the Duke of Edinburgh's generous donation of their share of profits from the film Royal Family that enabled the academy to move to its headquarters at 195 Piccadilly. The Prince of Wales succeeded the Lord Attenborough to become the fifth President in the Academy's history.

== BAFTA Los Angeles ==
BAFTA North America, founded in 1987 and currently chaired by Joyce Pierpoline, is the bridge between the Hollywood and British production and entertainment business communities. The BAFTA Los Angeles location hosts a series of events, including the Britannia Awards, the Awards Season Film and Television Tea Parties in January and September, and the annual Garden Party.

BAFTA Los Angeles provides access to screenings, Q&As with creative talent, produces seminars with UK film and television executives and the Heritage Archive, featuring interviews with British members of the film and television industries. The Los Angeles location also hosts the Student Film Awards and has an active Scholarship Program offering financial support and mentorship to UK students studying in the US. It created The Inner City Cinema, a screening program providing free screenings of theatrical films to inner-city areas not served by theatres. The success of Inner City Cinema has led to further free screening programs extended to multiple inner-city parks through the academy's work with both the County of Los Angeles Department of Parks and Recreation (Parks After Dark) and The City of Los Angeles Department of Recreation and Parks (Teen Summer Camps).

=== Britannia Awards ===
The Britannia Awards are BAFTA Los Angeles' highest accolade, a "celebration of achievements honouring individuals and companies that have dedicated their careers to advancing the entertainment arts". The Awards began in 1989 and usually take place in October/November every year. There are no awards given to specific movies or TV programmes, only to individuals. During the first ten years, one award was given at each event, named the 'Britannia Award for Excellence in Film', but since 1999 the number of awards has increased.

Awards given include "The Stanley Kubrick Britannia Award for Excellence in Film" (the original award was renamed during 2000 to honour director Stanley Kubrick), presented to an individual "upon whose work is stamped the indelible mark of authorship and commitment, and who has lifted the craft to new heights"; "The John Schlesinger Britannia Award for Artistic Excellence in Directing" (added during 2003 in honour of John Schlesinger); the "Britannia Award for British Artist of the Year"; and the "Albert R. Broccoli Britannia Award for Worldwide Contribution to Filmed Entertainment". In select years, the evening has included the "BAFTA Los Angeles Humanitarian Award".

The show has been broadcast on TV around the world, including the TV Guide Network and BBC America in the United States.

== BAFTA Scotland ==
BAFTA Scotland is a branch of the academy located in Glasgow, Scotland.

Since 1986, BAFTA has continued to specifically champion the film, television and game industries in Scotland by celebrating excellence, championing new Scottish talent and reaching out to the public.

=== British Academy Scotland Awards ===
The British Academy Scotland Awards are BAFTA Scotland's annual awards ceremony, celebrating and rewarding the highest achievements in Scottish film, television and games.

=== BAFTA Scotland New Talent Awards ===
BAFTA Scotland also produces the annual New Talent Awards ceremony, shining a spotlight on new and emerging Scottish talent in the art forms of moving image. Since they began in 1996, the annual New Talent Awards highlight the creativity that exists in Scotland by recognising and rewarding talented individuals who have started to work in the film, television and games industries.

== BAFTA Wales ==
BAFTA Cymru is a branch of the academy located in Cardiff, Wales. Formed in 1991, BAFTA Cymru extends the charity's mission across the UK in support of Wales' creative communities.

=== British Academy Cymru Awards ===
For over 25 years BAFTA Cymru has celebrated Welsh talent across film and television production and craft and performance roles with the British Academy Cymru Awards, its annual awards ceremony that takes place in Cardiff. In 2016, having reviewed the eligibility criteria for last year's awards, BAFTA Cymru now encourages Welsh individuals who have worked on Welsh or UK productions – rather than solely Welsh productions – to enter into any one of the 16 craft and performance categories, "[ensuring] that BAFTA in Wales can recognise the work of talented individuals who are working on network productions in craft or performance roles across the UK."

== BAFTA New York ==
BAFTA New York founded in 1996, recognises and promotes the achievements of British film and television in New York and all along the East Coast of the US.

It hosts feature film, television and documentary screenings, panel discussions, premieres and co-produced events with other established organisations in the film and television industry, and runs an educational outreach program aimed at underserved youth in New York City that includes the BAFTA New York Media Studies Scholarship Program.

== Controversy ==
On 26 October 2017, Norwegian actress Natassia Malthe accused Harvey Weinstein of raping her in a London hotel after the 2008 BAFTA Awards. On 2 February 2018, BAFTA formally terminated Weinstein's membership.

On 29 March 2021, Noel Clarke received the BAFTA Outstanding British Contribution to Cinema Award. This was suspended on 29 April 2021 following the publication of multiple and detailed accounts of sexual misconduct by The Guardian. Clarke has denied all allegations, except one. Clarke said: "I vehemently deny any sexual misconduct or criminal wrongdoing." The allegations were made by twenty different women. BAFTA was informed about the existence of allegations of verbal abuse, bullying and sexual harassment against Clarke thirteen days before presenting Clarke with his award. BAFTA acknowledges it received anonymous emails and reports of allegations via intermediaries, but, as it was not given evidence that would allow it to investigate, was unable to take action. In March 2022, the Metropolitan Police stated that Clarke would not face a criminal investigation due to a lack of evidence of any crimes having been committed.

== See also ==
- Academy Awards
- BAFTA Academy Fellowship Award
- Albert (organisation)
- National Film Awards UK
- Daily Mail National Film Awards (now defunct 1946–1951)
- British Academy Children's Awards
- British Academy Television Craft Awards
