= Emery Bonett =

English author and playwright (1906–1995)

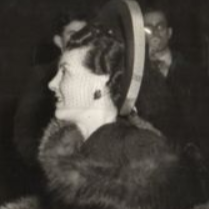
in 1948

Emery Bonett (2 December 1906 – 7 November 1995) was the pen name of Felicity Winifred Carter, an English writer and playwright. Her books were made into films. She wrote several mystery, suspense and detective novels in collaboration with her husband, John Bonett, published during the 1940s-60s.

== Life ==
Felicity Winifred Carter was born in Ecclesall, Sheffield, to John Carter and Winifred (née Naylor). Her father worked in his Sheffield-based family firm of manufacturing chemists, Carter and Sons Ltd. She came from a literary family: her mother, Winifred Carter, was a prolific author, as was her uncle, John L. Carter, and her aunt, Edith Carter, wrote several plays.

Initial success came with A Girl Must Live, which was first serialized in Leisure magazine and later published as a novel in 1936. It was also adapted as a 1939 film of the same name, starring Margaret Lockwood.

She married John Hubert Arthur Coulson (John Bonett), at Westminster Registry Office, London on 21 January 1939. They had one son, Nicholas (Nick) John Coulson, born 2 January 1947, at Queen Charlotte’s Hospital, Hammersmith, London.

She lived in Spain with her husband during her later years.

John planned the books and Emery did most of the actual writing: the partnership is described by the self-penned blurb in the Penguin edition of No Grave for a Lady:

"John and Emery Bonett met at a Spanish language class. Instead of learning Spanish they became engaged. Emery had been a repertory actress, a scene-painter, a showgirl at the Prince of Wales, the back legs of a horse, and finally a writer. She was working as an ‘extra’ in a film studio when she heard that her first novel, A Girl Must Live, had been accepted for publication. The next time she set foot in the same studio was to see the film version of the story being made.
John had been in various disreputable professions: banker, company secretary, Civil Servant, journalist, sales promotion executive. Emery found he had imagination and plot-sense as well as grammar and a distorted sense of humour, not to mention a magnificent grasp of facts – which always eluded Emery. So she brought him into the writing business... Jointly and separately they have written for radio and television, short stories, song lyrics, and film scripts."

== Combined works of John and Emery Bonett ==
Novels (with first UK/US publishing date)

Credited to Emery Bonett:

- A Girl Must Live 1936/—
- Never Go Dark 1940/—
- Make Do With Spring 1941/—
- High Pavement (US title: Old Mrs Camelot) 1944/1944

Credited to John and Emery Bonett:

- Dead Lion 1949/1949
- A Banner for Pegasus (US title: Not in the Script) 1951/1951
- No Grave for a Lady 1960/1959
- Better Dead (US title: Better Off Dead) 1964/1964
- The Private Face of Murder 1966/1966
- This Side Murder? (US title: Murder On the Costa Brava) 1967/1967
- The Sound of Murder 1970/1971
- No Time to Kill 1972/1972

Credited to John Bonett:

- Perish the Thought 1984/—

BBC Radio plays (with first broadcast date)

- One Fine Day 27.10.44 Home Service – included in Radio Theatre: Plays Specially Written for Broadcasting, edited and introduced by Val Gielgud; published: MacDonald & Co, London, 1946
- Mr Beverly Plays God 15.7.46 Home Service
- The Puppet Master 29.1.48 Home Service – included in Five Radio Plays, edited and introduced by Val Gielgud; published: Vox Mundi, London, 1948
- Divorce From Reality 16.11.52 Light Programme
- Deadly Nightingale 15.8.62 Home Service
- Manalive 31.10.62 Home Service – recording now lost
- The Gossamer Syndrome 7.4.75 Radio 4

Television (with first broadcast date)

- One Fine Day UK 14.8.47
- Face to Face UK 11.8.51
- Douglas Fairbanks Jr. Presents: Blue Murder US/UK 24.8.55
- The Puppet Master US 24.1.56

Films

- A Girl Has to Live (US title: A Girl Must Live) UK 1939 – based on eponymous novel
- One Exciting Night aka You Can’t Do Without Love UK 1944 – wrote additional dialogue
- My Sister and I UK 1948 – based on novel: High Pavement
- The Glass Mountain (Italian title: Montagna di cristallo) Italy/UK 1949 – cowrote screenplay; also wrote lyrics to Take the Sun, a Nino Rota song featured in the film
- Children Galore UK 1955 – cowrote screenplay
