= Henrietta Tayler =

Jacobite scholar and First World War nurse

- Born: Helen Agnes Henrietta Tayler; 24 March 1869
- Died: 10 April 1951 (aged 82)
- Other name: known as Hetty
- Known for: Jacobite scholar and World War One nurse
- Relatives: brother and co-author Alistair Tayler

Henrietta Tayler (24 March 1869 – 10 April 1951), known as Hetty, was a London-born Jacobite scholar and First World War Voluntary Aid Detachment nurse.

== Family life ==
Helen Agnes Henrietta Tayler (known as Hetty) was born in London on 24 March 1869, to parents William James Tayler, Laird of Glenbarry, and Georgina Lucy Duff and had an older sister, Constance and younger brother, Alistair Tayler (11 July 1870 – 8 November 1937) who was born at the family home in Rothiemay, Angus. Alistair and Hetty became Jacobite scholars and wrote about Scotland's history, in which their parents' forebears had played a large part. Through regular visits to the historical seat of her grandparents, Duff House, Hetty and her brother found historical materials that stimulated their interest to research and write about Scotland's past.

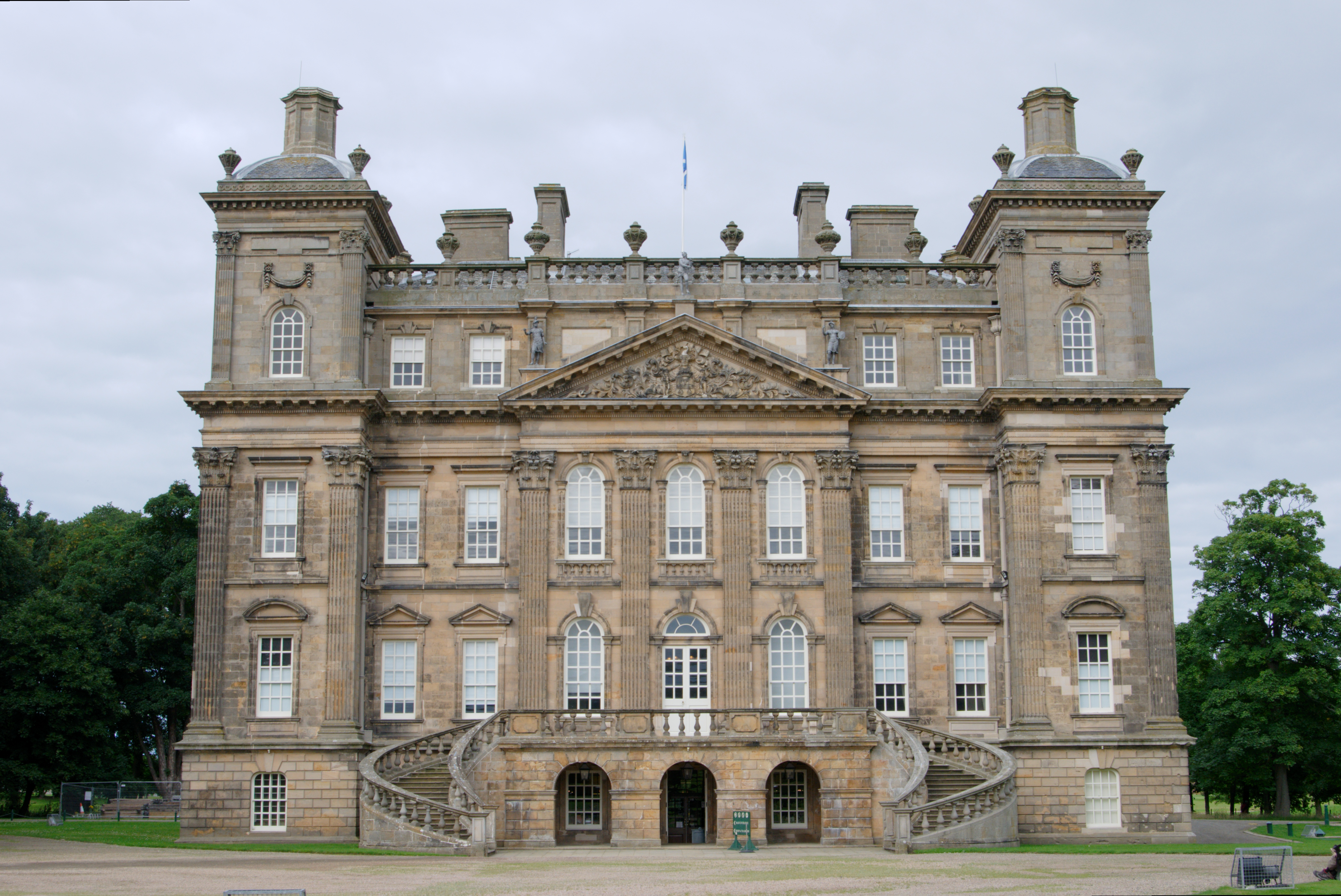
Duff House, Banffshire

The first book that Hetty and Alistair had published was in 1914 in two volumes and covered the Duff family history.

Other families researched in their publications include Forbes and Urquharts.

At that point, World War One broke out, Hetty Tayler joined up as a volunteer nurse (Voluntary Aid Detachment or VAD) with the Red Cross, nursing Belgian refugees from the German invasion, and then Tayler came back in Scotland, was appointed Matron of a VAD hospital established at Earlsmount house, Keith, treating returning wounded servicemen. Tayler wanted to return closer to the front, and went to Belgium again to care for children. She was 'a short woman, barely five feet tall, but she had a big heart, an inquiring mind, a great sense of humour and a ready smile'.

Tayler also served in Italy, nursing civilians and servicemen suffering from the 1918-19 'Spanish flu' influenza pandemic. She wrote in A Scottish Nurse at Work: Being a Record of what One Semi-trained Nurse Has Been Privileged to See and Do During Four and a Half Years of War ‘We did all our work in eucalyptus masks and everything was disinfected, even our letters’.

During her nursing experience, Tayler learned language skills which helped the post-war research work with her brother e.g. researching papers in Paris and the Vatican and indexing and reviewing the 500 volumes of 'Stuart' papers, held at Windsor Castle. Tayler was pleased that her brother and herself were 'the last historians ‘to sail the uncharted seas of the Stuart Papers, making on the way the most thrilling discoveries,’ which had to be all transcribed manually. From this archive, the Taylers were able to write from analysis of the original journal of John William O’Sullivan,(Adjutant-General and Quartermaster-General of the Jacobite army) one of the Seven Men of Moidart, the close supporters who travelled to Scotland with Charles Edward Stuart, Bonnie Prince Charlie.

The Tayler siblings published 30 books with different publishers, and many articles. When Alistair died in 1937, Hetty grieved but continued her historical research and published further books.

== Death and legacy ==
Tayler died on 10 April 1951 and was buried next to family members in Brompton Cemetery, Kensington, London. Tayler's scholarship and approachable style has informed much of what is known about the Jacobites of 1745, to date, as recently as 1995, referred to as 'devoted labours of a remarkable brother and sister'.

== Publications ==
- Alasdair and Hetty Tayler (1914). The Book of the Duffs. William Brown.,
- Alasdair and Hetty Tayler (1928). Jacobites of Aberdeenshire and Banffshire in the 45. Milne & Hutcheon, Aberdeen.,
- Alasdair and Hetty Tayler (1933). The Ogilvies of Boyne. Aberdeen University Press.,
- Alasdair and Hetty Tayler (1934). Jacobites of Aberdeenshire and Banffshire in the Rising of 1715. Oliver & Boyd, Edinburgh and London. - about Charles, Lord Fraser of Muchalls, William Fraser of Inverallochy, Captain Simon Fraser and the Hon. James Fraser of Lonmay,
- Alasdair and Hetty Tayler (1939). John Graham of Claverhouse. Duckworth, London.
- Alasdair and Hetty Tayler (1937). The House of Forbes. 3rd Spalding Club, Aberdeen. ISBN 0-912951-29-X and Scotpress 1987.
- Henrietta Tayler ( 1937). The Child Sovereigns of Scotland. TA Constable.
- Hetty Tayler (1946). History of the Family of Urquhart. Aberdeen University Press
- Hetty Tayler (1949). Bonnie Prince Charlie. Thomas Nelson
- Hetty Tayler (1950). Prince Charlie's Daughter: Being the Life and Letters of Charlotte of Albany. Batchworth Press, London.
