= A Girl Must Live =

1939 film by Carol Reed

- Directed by: Carol Reed
- Written by: Frank Launder
- Based on: novel by Emery Bonett
- Produced by: Edward Black
- Starring: Margaret Lockwood; Renée Houston; Lilli Palmer; Hugh Sinclair
- Music by: Louis Levy; Charles Williams (uncredited)
- Production company: Gainsborough Pictures
- Distributed by: 20th Century Fox
- Release date: 29 April 1939
- Running time: 92 minutes
- Country: United Kingdom
- Language: English

A Girl Must Live is a 1939 British romantic comedy film directed by Carol Reed and starring Margaret Lockwood, Renée Houston, Lilli Palmer, Hugh Sinclair, and Naunton Wayne. It was written by Frank Launder based on the 1936 novel of the same title by Emery Bonett, and was one of a series of films Reed made starring Lockwood. Three chorus line girls compete for the affection of a wealthy bachelor.

== Plot ==
Running away from her finishing school in Switzerland, Leslie James (a false name taken from a musical star of the past) finds a room in a London boarding house. There she learns from two other lodgers, Gloria and Clytie, that there will be an audition for a new musical that day, at which all three win places in the chorus line. Gloria meanwhile, tipped off by her conman cousin Hugo who plans to make plenty of money out of the deal, has caught the eye of the bachelor Earl of Pangborough. Her roommate Clytie, also keen on what profit she can extract, tries to detach him at the first night party but instead of these brash blonde showgirls he prefers the quiet brunette Leslie.

He invites the whole cast to spend the weekend at his country mansion, just so that he can get closer to Leslie. Despite spirited competition from Gloria and Clytie, manipulation from Hugo, and hostility from the Earl's aunt, she keeps his interest. Terrified however that she will be exposed as a runaway schoolgirl using a false name, she flees the house in the middle of the night. Abandoning his guests, the Earl gives chase and his pursuit ends with the two marrying.

== Cast ==
- Margaret Lockwood as Leslie James
- Renée Houston as Gloria Lind
- Lilli Palmer as Clytie Devine
- George Robey as Horace Blount
- Hugh Sinclair as Earl of Pangborough
- Naunton Wayne as Hugo Smythe
- Moore Marriott as Bretherton Hythe
- Mary Clare as Mrs. Wallis
- David Burns as Joe Gold
- Kathleen Harrison as Penelope
- Drusilla Wills as Miss Polkinghome
- Wilson Coleman as Mr. Joliffe
- Helen Haye as Aunt Primrose
- Frederick Burtwell as Hodder
- Muriel Aked as Mme. Dupont, headmistress
- Martita Hunt as Mme. Dupont, assistant
- Kathleen Boutall as Mrs. Blount
- Michael Hordern
- Merle Tottenham as college inmate
- Joan White as college inmate

== Production ==
Gaumont British bought the rights and decided to make the film as one of their 12 "A class" features for 1937–38, made with an eye on the US market, with Anna Lee and Lilli Palmer as the original stars. Eventually Margaret Lockwood and Renée Houston were announced as stars.

== Reception ==
The Monthly Film Bulletin wrote: "This sordid story exploits sex in situation and dialogue. The latter is full of double entendres, and while admittedly amusing at times, is frequently vulgar. The scene in which Clytie and Gloria, scantily clad, fight furiously with brushes, scratch and bite each other and tear out each other's hair is repellent. The characters are almost all unpleasant people."
