= The Gladys Half-Hour =

- Genre: Television play
- Directed by: Royston Morley
- Starring: Spike Milligan; Ray Barrett; John Bluthal; Frank Taylor
- Country of origin: Australia
- Original language: English
- No. of episodes: 1

Production
- Running time: 30 minutes
- Production company: ABC

The Gladys Half-Hour is a 1958 Australian TV play starring Spike Milligan directed by Royston Morley. It aired 27 August 1958 in Sydney. Milligan made it while in Australia appearing on various radio shows.

It aired in Melbourne on 17 October 1958.

== Cast ==
- Spike Milligan
- Ray Barrett
- John Bluthal
- Frank Taylor
