= Albert (organisation) =

Environmental certification for film and television productions

BAFTA Albert
- The current Albert logo
- Standards organization: BAFTA
- Effective region: United Kingdom and Ireland
- Effective since: 2011
- Product category: Television and film production
- Type of standard: Industrial
- Legal status: Advisory
- Website: baftaalbert.org

Albert (stylised as albert) is an environmental organisation aiming to encourage sustainable film and television production. It began as a carbon footprint calculator for productions at the BBC, a tool which was subsequently donated to a new Albert organisation headed by BAFTA in 2011.

Albert's strategy and development is supported by a steering group of industry representatives. The steering group currently includes the BBC, ITV, C4, Netflix, Amazon MGM Studios, Warner Bros. Discovery, PACT, Channel 5 and BAFTA.

== Carbon footprint calculator and certification ==
The Albert carbon footprint calculator allows a production to calculate its predicted carbon footprint from pre- to post-production. Productions can then go through the certification process, where they implement sustainable production techniques to reduce carbon emissions where possible, and offsets where it is not. Productions that successfully complete certification are awarded a 1, 2 or 3 star certificate and given use of the Albert Certified Production logo on their credits.

Currently, all BBC, ITV, Channel 4, UKTV, Sky and Netflix productions in the UK are required to register their carbon footprint using the Albert carbon calculator, and the BBC requires all television commissions to be Albert certified. In 2023, 3,003 productions registered their carbon footprints via Albert, and 2,451 received Albert certification.

== Initiatives ==
=== Green Rider ===
In May 2019, Albert launched the "Green Rider" project in association with Spotlight. The Green Rider takes its name from the inclusion rider, as a way to champion climate action through an actor's contract, calling for good environmental practices to be observed on set. For example, requesting plant-based catering, low energy lighting, or for the production company to agree to a 'zero to landfill' policy for its sets.

=== Creative Energy ===
Albert started the Creative Energy project in 2017, which enables production companies to switch to a 100% renewable energy supplier. The supplier that Albert partners with is reviewed every year based on 'green' criteria. Their previous supplier was Good Energy. However, they are now supplied by the green energy supplier Ecotricity since 2024. Creative Offsets is another upcoming Albert scheme which allows productions to offset/mitigate their environmental impact with carbon offsetting schemes.

=== Planet Placement ===
In 2019 Albert launched "Planet Placement", an initiative to include sustainability messaging in media.

=== Screen New Deal ===
In September 2020, Albert launched the "Screen New Deal" report in association with the British Film Institute and Arup as a route-map to help film production transition to net zero emissions by 2050. The report explores and gives examples of how more sustainable practices can be implemented across the film and TV industries.
