= The Case of Gabriel Perry =

1935 British film by Albert de Courville

- Directed by: Albert de Courville
- Written by: L. du Garde Peach
- Based on: play Wild Justice by James Dale
- Produced by: Herbert Smith
- Starring: Henry Oscar; Olga Lindo; Margaret Lockwood
- Cinematography: Charles Van Enger
- Production company: British Lion Film Corporation
- Distributed by: British Lion Film Corporation (UK)
- Release date: May 1935 (UK)
- Running time: 77 minutes
- Country: United Kingdom
- Language: English

The Case of Gabriel Perry is a 1935 British crime film directed by Albert de Courville and starring Henry Oscar, Olga Lindo and Margaret Lockwood. It was written by L. du Garde Peach based on the 1933 play Wild Justice by James Dale.

== Plot ==
An unstable Victorian doctor murders a woman.

== Cast ==
- Henry Oscar as Gabriel Perry
- Olga Lindo as Mrs Perry
- Margaret Lockwood as Mildred Perry
- Franklin Dyall as Prosecution
- Raymond Lovell as Defence
- John Wood as Godfrey Perry
- Martita Hunt as Mrs Read
- Rodney Ackland as Tommy Read
- Percy Walsh as William Read
- Ralph Truman as Inspector White
- Alastair Sim as minor role

== Reception ==
The Monthly Film Bulletin wrote: "Most of the acting is competent, and the trial scene – a substantial part of the film – is a much better dramatic presentation than most court scenes appearing on the screen to-day. But the direction is at times a little crude, at others lacking in clarity."

The Daily Film Renter wrote: "Engrossing psychological study of murderer, painstakingly presented in drama that works up to strong climax. ... Henry Oscar gives holding portrayal in lead, revealing mind of homicidal maniac with uncanny skill. Unusual offering of pronounced box-office calibre."

Kine Weekly wrote: "A vivid, penetrating psychological study of a vicious, inhuman hypocrite, expressed in terms of arresting, thrilling screen entertainment. There is, however, nothing highbrow about the picture; it is crisp, gripping theatre, treated intelligently from the popular and box-office angle. Henry Oscar, of course, dominates the plot; his part is the fat one, but the director adroitly avoids all the pitfalls of the one-man show."

== Preservation status ==
The British Film Institute National Archive holds a collection of ephemera and stills but no film or video materials.
