= Novelty Theatre =

Former theatre in London, England

- Folies Dramatiques Theatre; Jodrell Theatre; New Queen's Theatre; Eden Palace of Varieties; Great Queen Street Theatre; Kingsway Theatre
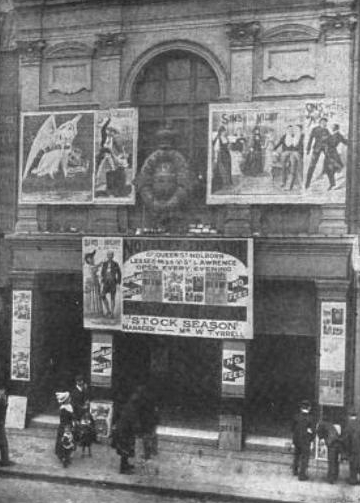
- Photo in The Sketch, 19 August 1896
- Interactive map of Novelty Theatre
- Address: Great Queen Street; Camden, London
- Coordinates: 51.515151°N 0.121212°W
- Type: Theatre
- Designation: demolished
- Current use: site of office block

Construction
- Opened: 9 December 1882
- Closed: 11 May 1941
- Architect: Thomas Verity

The Novelty Theatre (later renamed the Great Queen Street Theatre from 1900 to 1907, and the Kingsway Theatre from 1907 to 1941) was a London theatre. It opened in 1882 at No 8 Great Queen Street. The theatre was accessed from Little Queen Street until 1905 and from the new Kingsway road from 1905 onwards. It hosted the London premiere of A Doll's House in 1889. The theatre closed in 1941, was heavily damaged in the Blitz and was demolished in 1959.

== History ==
The first theatre on the site was built to designs by Thomas Verity with decorations by E. W. Bradwell, and opened on 9 December 1882. Its first show was the comic opera Melita or the Parsee's Daughter, composed by Henry Pontet, with a libretto by Juba Kennerley. It hosted, among other notable works, a revival of Les Cloches de Corneville and Ascot, by Percy Fendall, in 1883. Edward Solomon and James Mortimer's Polly or The Pet of the Regiment played at the theatre in 1884. The Blue Bells of Scotland, by Robert Williams Buchanan, premiered at the theatre in 1887, followed by James Mortimer's The Alderman and Fred Marsden's Bob, both in 1888. The Russian National Opera Company produced The Demon at the Novelty in 1888, and the theatre hosted the London premiere of Henrik Ibsen's A Doll's House in 1889. In August 1896, Wilfred Moritz Franks accidentally stabbed Temple E. Crozier fatally onstage during a performance of Frank Harvey's melodrama, Sins of the Night. The Merchant of Venice was presented at the theatre in 1897.

Its interior was rebuilt in 1898–1900 and 1907, reopening after the two reconstructions as the Great Queen Street Theatre (1900–1907) and Kingsway Theatre (1907–1941) respectively. From 1900 to 1907, W. S. Penley managed the theatre, producing and starring in A Little Ray of Sunshine by Mark Ambient and revivals of The Private Secretary and Charley's Aunt in 1900. It also featured the 1915 premiere of Pearn and Elgar's The Starlight Express and the London premiere of the musical Oh, Boy! in 1919, which ran for 167 performances. In 1934 Winifred Carter's historical play The Queen Who Kept Her Head appeared at the theatre.

In 1939 it hosted the premiere of Rutland Boughton's third symphony and finally closed on 11 May 1941. It was heavily bomb-damaged during the Blitz and remained closed until its demolition in 1959. Its site is now occupied by an extension of Newton Street into Great Queen Street, and an office block.
