= Chance of a Ghost =

1958 Australian television play

- Genre: thriller
- Based on: play by James Carhartt and Nicholas Winter
- Written by: James Carhartt
- Directed by: Royston Morley
- Country of origin: Australia
- Original language: English

Production
- Running time: 60 minutes
- Production company: ABC

Original release
- Network: ABC
- Release: 26 February 1958 (Sydney, live)
- Release: 28 March 1958 (Melbourne, taped)

Chance of a Ghost is a 1958 Australian television play directed by Royston Morley and written by James Carhartt based on a play by Carhartt and Nicholas Winter. It was based on a radio play. Australian TV drama was relatively rare at the time.

== Plot ==
On New Year's Eve, a party of Americans have a celebrations at a penthouse where 20 years before a musical comedy star had been killed. One member of the party, Serena, becomes interested in the story. She becomes so obsessed she is "possessed" by the spirit of the dead woman and begins to look and behave like her.

== Cast ==
- Bert Bertram as Friend
- Jacqueline Knott as Serena
- Moray Powell
- Walter Sullivan

== Production ==
The idea for the plot came from a murder committed at the Medical Arts Building in New York. "For years afterwards no one would rent the place and it became known as the haunted penthouse," said James Carhartt who turned it into a play with Nicholas Winter. Carhartt was an American who moved to Sydney and he adapted the play for Australian television. He wrote such plays for Australian radio as Finger Your Neck.

== See also ==
- List of live television plays broadcast on Australian Broadcasting Corporation (1950s)
