= Pygmalion (TV play) =

- Based on: Pygmalion; 1913 play by George Bernard Shaw
- Produced by: Royston Morley
- Starring: Margaret Lockwood; Ralph Michael; Arthur Wontner
- Production company: BBC
- Release date: 8 February 1948
- Running time: 150 mins
- Country: United Kingdom
- Language: English

Pygmalion is a 1948 British TV production of the 1913 play by George Bernard Shaw. It was the first time the play was done for television and was the longest production done by the BBC to that time.

It starred Margaret Lockwood who was under suspension by the Rank Organisation at the time for refusing a film role.

== Cast ==
- Ralph Michael as Professor Henry Higgins
- Margaret Lockwood as Eliza Doolittle
- Arthur Wontner as Colonel Pickering
- Gordon Harker as Alfred Doolittle
- Helen Cherry as Clara Eynsford-Hill
- Mary Merrall as Mrs. Eynsford-Hill
- Bryan Coleman as Freddie Eynsford-Hill
- Beatrice Varley as Mrs. Pearce

== Reception ==
The production was very well received. It was voted best TV production of the year and Lockwood voted Best Actress.

It was Lockwood's first play on TV and she wrote in her memoirs that "I loved every moment of Pygmalion. After the performance I was like a beginner again waiting nervously for the papers, bracing myself to read the criticism. I had not felt this way about notices since I first went on the stage. Thank goodness they were good ones. I was generously praised."

Lockwood later toured with the play on stage.
