= The Admirable Crichton (1950 TV production) =

- Directed by: Royston Morley
- Written by: J. M. Barrie
- Produced by: Royston Morley
- Starring: Raymond Huntley
- Production company: BBC
- Release date: 11 June 1950
- Country: United Kingdom
- Language: English

The Admirable Crichton is a 1950 British TV adaptation of the 1902 play The Admirable Crichton by J. M. Barrie. It was directed and produced by Royston Morley. It stars Raymond Huntley.

== Cast ==
- Raymond Huntley as Crichton
- Jean Compton as Lady Catherine Lasenby
- Joan Hopkins as Lady Mary Lasenby
- Alvys Maben as Lady Agatha Lasenby
- David Markham as Hon. Ernest Woolley
- Harcourt Williams as Earl of Loam
- Geoffrey Wearing as Reverend John Treherne
- Richard Carr as Monsieur Fleury
