= Winifred Carter =

English author and playwright

not to be confused with Winifred S Carter, an American celebrity chef and cookery author also active from the 1920s to the 1940s.

Winifred Carter (c. 1883–1949) was an English author and playwright, who was particularly active from the 1920s to the 1940s.

== Life ==
Carter was the mother of the mystery and detective novel author Emery Bonett and the wife of novelist John L. Carter, brother of actress and playwright Edith Carter.

Winifred Carter's most successful work was probably her 1945 novel Princess Fitz, which was made into a 1947 film Mrs. Fitzherbert. It is a romance set in 1783, which chronicles the convoluted, yet ultimately doomed, relationship between a prince regent and a Catholic widow (Mrs Fitzherbert).

== Bibliography of novels and short stories (with first UK/US publishing dates) ==
- Ashes of Eden 1915/—
- Lass o' Laughter... The Novel of the Play by Edith Carter and Nan Marriott-Watson 1922/1922
- Sylvia Revolts 1922/—
- Miss Mischief (Ivy Stories no. 7) 1922/— (short story)
- Ashes of Eden 1922/—
- Celia Bound 1923/—
- A Lovable Imp (Ivy Stories no. 78) 1925/— (short story)
- Marriage by Mistake 1925/—
- The Strange Case of Lorna Tallis 1925/— (novella)
- Rosemary the Rebel (Ivy Stories no. 92) 1926/— (short story)
- Jealous Gwen (Ivy Stories no. 110) 1927/— (short story)
- Rose-the Dancer 1928/1929
- The Dead Return 1929/—
- Elizabeth Plays With Fire 1929/—
- The Pretty Governess (Red Letter Novels no. 229) 1929/— (novella)
- A Lost Paradise (Red Letter Novels no. 233) 1929/— (novella)
- Just a Butterfly (Ivy Stories no. 169) 1929/— (short story)
- A Rejected Girl (Red Letter Novels no. 244) 1930/— (novella)
- The Marriage Bargain! 1930/— (short story)
- Whose Sin? 1930/— (short story)
- His Difficult Daughter 1930/—
- The Money Maid 1931/—
- Why Didn't She Tell Him? 1931/— (short story)
- The Dashing Rebel (Ivy Stories no. 239) 1932/— (short story)
- My Year of Love (Red Letter Novels no. 301) 1932/— (novella)
- Sometime-Never (Ivy Stories no. 252) 1932/— (short story)
- Out of the Shadows 1933/— (novella)
- She Thought Herself Loved (Red Letter Novels no. 318) 1933/— (novella)
- Rich Girl Rival 1936/— (novella)
- Golden Bait 1937/— (novella)
- Probationer Pat 1937/—
- Judy-Be Careful! 1939/— (novella)
- The Love Call 1939/— (possibly originally published 1930)
- The Wrong Prince Charming 1939/—
- This Love Business 1941/—
- Sarah. A Novel 1943/—
- Princess Fitz (US title: Princess Fury) 1945/—
- In Scarlet Dress 1946/—
- Tudor Triangle 1947/—
- Enchanted Cup 1948/—
- Dr. Johnson's Dear Mistress 1949/1950
- Troubadour of Love 1950/—
- Son of Arlotte 1951/—

== Plays ==
- A Man's Enemies – Richmond Theatre, London
- High Fever – Arts Theatre, London and repertory
- Sarah-Duchess of Marlborough – Adelphi Theatre, London 1932
- Marriage Harvest – Q Theatre, London 1932
- Moloch. A play in Three Acts aka Escape From Glory (US title: Every Mother's Son) – Players' and Strand Theatres, London and Bard Theater, US; published 1935/—
- The Two Mrs. Camerons. A Play in Three Acts (cowritten with Edith Carter) – Q Theatre, London and Townley Street Sunday School by the CS Players January 1945; published 1936/1937
- Wanted-a Wife. A Play in Three Acts (cowritten with Edith Carter) – Q Theatre, London and repertory; published 1936/1937 (possibly originally published 1922 or 1926)
- The Work-a-Day World. A Comedy in One Act for Eleven Women – published 1936
- Doctor Johnson's Mrs. Thrale – Adelphi, Strand, Little and Kingsway Theatres, London; published 1938/— (possibly originally published 1936)
- The Queen Who Kept Her Head aka The Intriguing Queen – Kingsway and Adelphi Theatres, London and repertory; published 1934/—

== Film ==
- Princess Fitz (US title: Mrs. Fitzherbert) UK 1947/1950 – based on eponymous novel
