= Mrs. Fitzherbert (film) =

- Original Australian daybill
- Directed by: Montgomery Tully
- Written by: Montgomery Tully
- Based on: the novel Princess Fitz by Winifred Carter
- Produced by: Louis H. Jackson
- Starring: Peter Graves; Joyce Howard; Leslie Banks; Margaretta Scott
- Cinematography: James Wilson
- Edited by: Charles Hasse
- Music by: Stanley Black
- Production company: British National Films
- Distributed by: Pathé Pictures International (UK)
- Release date: 3 December 1947 (London)
- Running time: 99 minutes
- Country: United Kingdom
- Language: English

Mrs. Fitzherbert (also known as Princess Fitz and A Court Secret) is a 1947 British black and white historical drama film directed by Montgomery Tully and starring Peter Graves, Joyce Howard and Leslie Banks. It was written by Tully adapted from the 1945 novel Princess Fitz by Winifred Carter. It depicts the relationship between George IV and Maria Fitzherbert.

== Preservation status ==
The British Film Institute National Archive holds a collection of stills but no film or video materials.

== Plot ==
The Duke of Wellington goes to meet an elderly Maria Fitzherbert to inform her of George IV's death and she recalls how she had rebuffed George at their first meeting, in which he saved her from a Protestant rioter on the night on the Gordon Riots. She continues to rebuff him but George pursues marriage with her, even knowing that – as she is a Roman Catholic – this will breach both the Act of Succession and the Royal Marriages Act. She flees to Brighton and George soon follows, where they meet again and agree simply to remain friends. However, scandal soon grows as they attend more and more social occasions together.

Maria initially refuses a renewed offer of marriage from George but soon afterwards relents and agrees to a secret marriage after he makes a suicide attempt. George is summoned from the couple's country retreat by his mother Queen Charlotte to scotch rumours of the marriage - he instead confirms them but fails to win Charlotte round to the marriage. George and Maria move back to Brighton, where he begins work on Brighton Pavilion and moves a House of Commons debate on his finances, though this degenerates into a discussion of the rumoured marriage. Fox quells the debate by presenting a letter from George denying rumours of the marriage, though he omits to add that the letter is not new but was in fact written before the marriage. George goes to meet his father but finds himself forestalled, as the letter has convinced the king that George really has repudiated the marriage. Overjoyed, he arranges to pay off George's debts and George leaves without even mentioning Maria.

George retreats into decadence and depression, acquiescing to a false rumour of an affair between Maria and the Duke of Bedford spread by Lady Jersey, finally repudiating Maria and accepting a political marriage with Caroline of Brunswick, though his first meeting with her goes badly. Maria retires to the country, where George's brother William keeps her informed of developments, whilst George's friends only just manage to stop him running back to Maria even on the morning of his wedding to Caroline. The scene shifts back to the elderly Maria and Wellington discussing George's death, where he informs her that among his last words was "Marguerita", his pet name for her, proving he had not forgotten her.

== Cast ==
- Peter Graves as Prince of Wales
- Joyce Howard as Maria Fitzherbert
- Leslie Banks as Charles James Fox, friend of the Prince
- Margaretta Scott as Lady Jersey, lady-in-waiting and ally to Queen Charlotte
- Wanda Rotha as Princess Caroline of Brunswick
- Mary Clare as the Duchess of Devonshire
- Frederick Valk as George III, the Prince's father
- Ralph Truman as Richard Brinsley Sheridan, friend of the Prince
- John Stuart as Duke of Bedford
- Helen Haye as Lady Sefton, Maria's chaperone
- Chili Bouchier as Norris
- Lily Kann as Queen Charlotte, the Prince's mother
- Lawrence O'Madden as Lord Southampton
- Frederick Leister as Henry Errington, Maria's uncle
- Scott Forbes as Prince William, the Prince's younger brother
- Barry Morse as Beau Brummell, friend of the Prince
- Eugene Deckers as Philippe
- Ivor Barnard as Reverend Robert Burt, priest at Maria and George's wedding
- Henry Oscar as William Pitt
- Arthur Dulac as Franz Joseph Haydn

== Production ==
The movie was shot under the title Princess Fritz. It was made by British National.

== Critical reception ==
The Monthly Film Bulletin wrote: "This fanciful version of a romantic episode in history makes a fairly entertaining costume love story but its period atmosphere, as well as both the psychological and the historical treatment, are somewhat superficial. An excellent performance is given by Leslie Banks as Fox, but Joyce Howard and Peter Graves, however good as a light romantic team, are hardly convincing as the First Gentleman and Mrs Fitzherbert."

The Daily Film Renter wrote: "The famous romance between the Prince Regent and Mrs. Fitzherbert, a commoner and a Catholic, makes a dullish costume play of lovers' meetings, pursuit and refusal which brings in various celebrities of the times including Charles Fox, Sheridan and Haydn. Peter Graves and Joyce Howard are rather unhappily cast in the principal roles, but are supported by a strong team of theatre personalities."

Variety wrote "Production on a modest budget is adequate for the slight story, but the greatest handicap is lack of marquée games although the cast is uniformly first-rate."

In The New York Times, Bosley Crowther wrote, "it is so rigidly played that the whole thing has the appearance of an animated wax-works on the move."
