= Princess Fitz =

1945 novel by Winifred Carter

- Author: Winifred Carter
- Language: English
- Genre: Historical
- Publisher: Selwyn and Blount
- Publication date: 1945
- Publication place: United Kingdom
- Media type: Print

Princess Fitz is a 1945 historical novel by the British writer Winifred Carter. It is based on the life of Maria Fitzherbert, first wife of the future George IV, whose marriage was invalidated by law because she was Catholic.

== Film adaptation ==
In 1947 it was made into a film Mrs. Fitzherbert directed by Montgomery Tully for British National Films and starring Joyce Howard as Fitzherbert and Peter Graves as Prince George.

== Bibliography ==
- Goble, Alan. The Complete Index to Literary Sources in Film. Walter de Gruyter, 1999.
