= Margaret Lockwood =

British actress (1916–1990)

Margaret Lockwood CBE
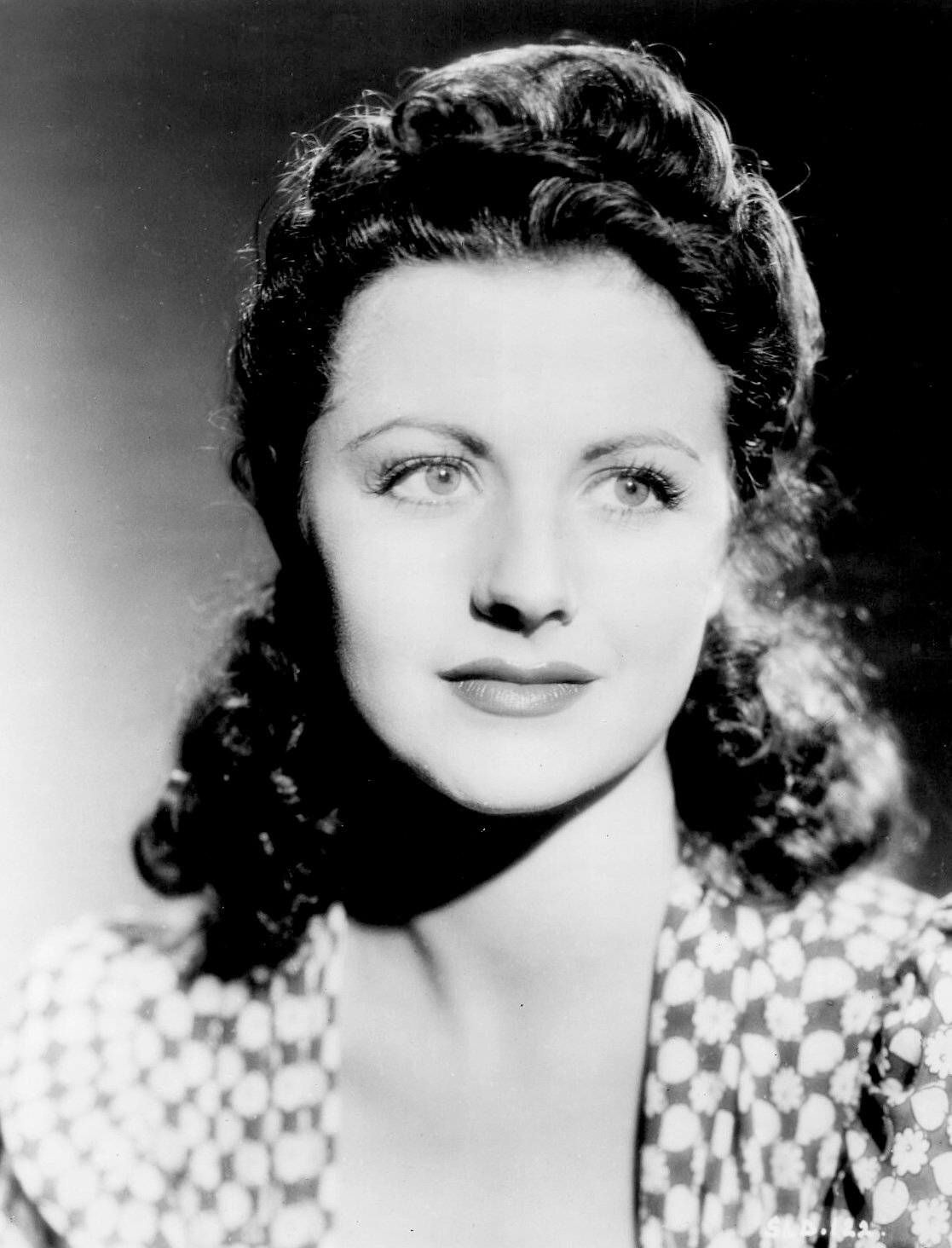
- Lockwood in 1940
- Born: Margaret Mary Day Lockwood; 15 September 1916; Karachi, Bombay Presidency, British India
- Died: 15 July 1990 (aged 73); Kensington, London, England
- Years active: 1928–1980
- Spouse: Rupert Leon (m. 1937; div. 1950)
- Children: Julia Lockwood

Margaret Mary Day Lockwood (15 September 1916 – 15 July 1990) was a British actress. One of Britain's most popular film stars of the 1930s and 1940s, her film appearances included The Lady Vanishes (1938), Night Train to Munich (1940), The Man in Grey (1943), and The Wicked Lady (1945). She was nominated for the BAFTA Award for Best British Actress for the 1955 film Cast a Dark Shadow. She also starred in the television series Justice (1971–1974). Ronald Bergan of The Guardian called her "one of the most beautiful, energetic, and spirited actresses in the history of British cinema."

== Early life ==
Lockwood was born on 15 September 1916 in Karachi, British India (today Pakistan), to Henry Francis Lockwood, an English administrator of a railway company, and his third wife, Scottish-born Margaret Eveline Waugh. She moved to England in 1920 with her mother, brother Lyn and half-brother Frank. Her half-sister Fay joined them the following year, but her father remained in Karachi, visiting them infrequently. She also had another half-brother, John, from her father's first marriage, brought up by his mother in Britain. Lockwood attended Sydenham High School for girls and a ladies' school in Kensington, London.

She began studying for the stage at an early age at the Italia Conti Academy of Theatre Arts, and made her debut in 1928, at the age of 12, at the Holborn Empire where she played a fairy in A Midsummer Night's Dream. In December of the following year, she appeared at the Scala Theatre in the pantomime The Babes in the Wood. In 1932 she appeared at the Theatre Royal, Drury Lane in Cavalcade.

== Career ==
In 1933, Lockwood enrolled at the Royal Academy of Dramatic Art in London, where she was seen by a talent scout and signed to a contract. In June 1934 she played Myrtle in House on Fire at the Queen's Theatre, and on 22 August 1934 appeared as Margaret Hamilton in Gertrude Jenning's play Family Affairs when it premiered at the Ambassadors Theatre; Helene Ferber in Repayment at the Arts Theatre in January 1936; Trixie Drew in Henry Bernard's play Miss Smith at the Duke of York's Theatre in July 1936; and back at the Queen's in July 1937 as Ann Harlow in Ann's Lapse.

=== Films ===
Lockwood began working in films in 1934, and in 1935 she appeared in the film version of Lorna Doone. For this, British Lion put her under contract for £500 a year for the first year, going up to £750 a year for the second year.

For British Lion she was in The Case of Gabriel Perry (1935), then was in Honours Easy (1935) with Greta Nissen and Man of the Moment (1935) with Douglas Fairbanks Jnr. These were standard ingénue roles. She was the female love interest in Midshipman Easy (1935), directed by Carol Reed, who would become crucial to Lockwood's career. She had the lead in Someday (1935), a quota quickie directed by Michael Powell and in Jury's Evidence (1936), directed by Ralph Ince.

Lockwood had a small role in The Amateur Gentleman (1936), another with Fairbanks. Her profile rose when she appeared opposite Maurice Chevalier in The Beloved Vagabond (1936)

She followed it with Irish for Luck (1936) and The Street Singer (1937). She had a small role in Who's Your Lady Friend? (1937), again for Carol Reed and was in Melody and Romance (1937).

=== Gaumont British ===
Gaumont British were making a film version of the novel Doctor Syn, starring George Arliss and Anna Lee with director Roy William Neill and producer Edward Black. Lee dropped out and was replaced by Lockwood. Lockwood so impressed the studio with her performance – particularly Black, who became a champion of hers – she signed a three-year contract with Gainsborough Pictures in June 1937. This was at £4,000 a year. According to writer Alan Wood, "Many people were astonished at the contract Ted Black gave her; but when they asked him about it, he said, "She has something with which every girl in the suburbs can identify herself". Black backed his judgment and built Margaret Lockwood into a star."

For Black and director Robert Stevenson she supported Will Fyffe in Owd Bob (1938), with John Loder.

=== British Stardom: Bank Holiday and The Lady Vanishes ===
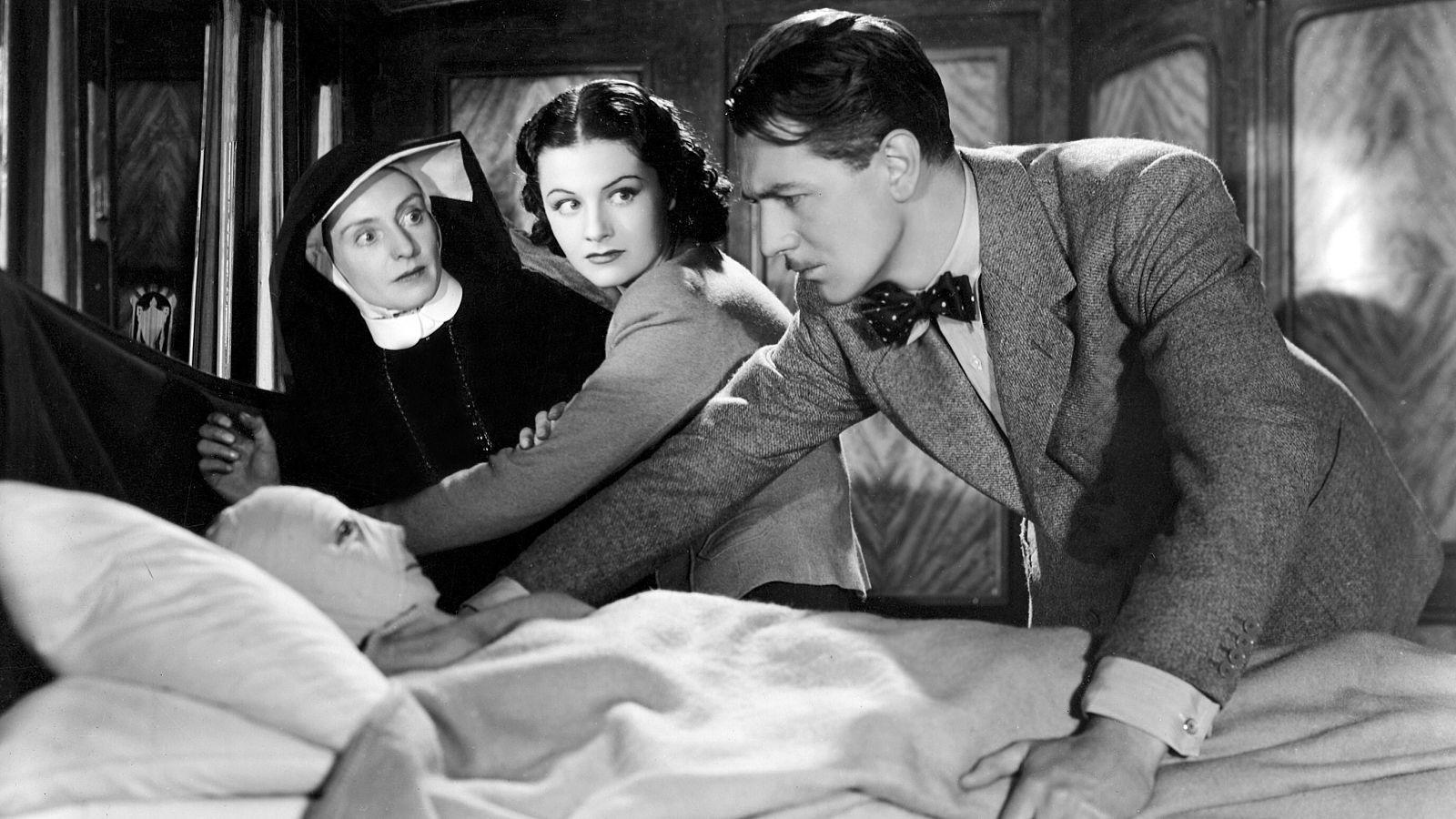
Catherine Lacey, Margaret Lockwood and Michael Redgrave in Alfred Hitchcock's The Lady Vanishes (1938)

Lockwood then had her best chance to-date, being given the lead in Bank Holiday, directed by Carol Reed and produced by Black. This movie was a hit and launched Lockwood as a star. She called it "my first really big picture... with a beautifully written script and a wonderful part for me." Gaumont increased her contract from three years to six.

Even more popular was her next movie, The Lady Vanishes, directed by Alfred Hitchcock, produced by Black and co-starring Michael Redgrave. Lockwood called it "one of the films I have enjoyed most in all my career." Hitchcock was greatly impressed by Lockwood, telling the press:

She has an undoubted gift in expressing her beauty in terms of emotion, which is exceptionally well suited to the camera. Allied to this is the fact that she photographs more than normally easily, and has an extraordinary insight in getting the feel of her lines, to live within them, so to speak, as long as the duration of the picture lasts. It is not too much to expect that, in Margaret Lockwood, the British picture industry has a possibility of developing a star of hitherto un-anticipated possibilities.

In a BFI article, Graham Fuller asserts that the "title of The Lady Vanishes is thought to refer to the kidnapped British spy Miss Froy (May Whitty), but it is the prim lady in Lockwood’s Iris Henderson that vanishes under the influence of Michael Redgrave’s charming musicologist with his battery of phallic symbols. The last flickers of virginal sweetness in Lockwood’s persona were extinguished by her portrayals of Hesther and Barbara Worth in morally ambivalent films based on novels by women".

She followed this with A Girl Must Live, a musical comedy about chorus girls for Black and Reed. It was one of a series of films made by Gaumont aimed at the US market.

=== American films ===
Gaumont British had distribution agreements with 20th Century Fox in the US and they expressed an interest in borrowing Lockwood for some films. She travelled to Los Angeles and was put to work supporting Shirley Temple in Susannah of the Mounties (1939). She was borrowed by Paramount for Rulers of the Sea (1939), with Will Fyffe and Douglas Fairbanks Jr. Paramount indicated a desire to use Lockwood in more films but she decided to go home.

=== Return to Britain ===
Lockwood returned to Britain in June 1939. She was meant to make film versions of Rob Roy and The Blue Lagoon but both projects were cancelled with the advent of war. Instead, she played the role of Jenny Sunley, the self-centred, frivolous wife of Michael Redgrave's character in The Stars Look Down for Carol Reed. Lockwood later admitted "I was far from being reconciled to my role of the unpleasant girl and everyone treated me warily. But as the film progressed I found myself working with Carol Reed and Michael Redgrave again and gradually I was fascinated to see what I could put into the part."

She did another with Reed, Night Train to Munich (1940), an attempt to repeat the success of The Lady Vanishes with the same screenwriters (Launder and Gilliat) and characters of Charters and Caldicott. Rex Harrison was the male star. This movie started filming in November 1939.

She was meant to be reunited with Reed and Redgrave in The Girl in the News (1940) but Redgrave withdrew, and he was replaced by Barry K. Barnes: Black produced and Sidney Gilliat wrote the script. Quiet Wedding (1941) was a comedy directed by Anthony Asquith. She was meant to appear in Hatter's Castle, but she withdrew because of pregnancy. Her return to acting was Alibi (1942), a thriller which she called "anything but a success...a bad film."

In September 1943 Variety estimated her salary at being US$24,000 per picture (equivalent to $357,000 in 2025).

== Career peak ==
=== The Man in Grey ===
Lockwood was well established as a middle-tier name. What made her a front rank star was The Man in Grey (1943), the first of what would be known as the Gainsborough melodramas. Lockwood wanted to play the part of Clarissa, but producer Edward Black cast her as the villainous Hesther. She was featured alongside Phyllis Calvert, James Mason and Stewart Granger for director Leslie Arliss. The film was a massive hit, one of the biggest in 1943 Britain, and made all four lead actors into top stars – at the end of the year, exhibitors voted Lockwood the seventh most popular British star at the box office.

She appeared in two comedies for Black: Dear Octopus (1943) with Michael Wilding from a play by Dodie Smith, which Lockwood felt was a backward step and Give Us the Moon (1944), with Vic Oliver directed by Val Guest. Much more popular than either of these was another melodrama with Arliss and Granger, Love Story (1944), where she played a terminally ill pianist.

Lockwood was reunited with James Mason in A Place of One's Own (1945), playing a housekeeper possessed by the spirit of a dead girl, but the film was not a success. I'll Be Your Sweetheart (1945) was a musical with Guest and Vic Oliver.

=== The Wicked Lady ===
Lockwood had the biggest success of her career to-date with the title role in The Wicked Lady (1945) for director Arliss. The film was the most popular movie at the British box office in 1946. In 1946, Lockwood gained the Daily Mail National Film Awards First Prize for most popular British film actress.

She was offered the role of Bianca in The Magic Bow but disliked the part and turned it down. Instead she was a murderess in Bedelia (1946), which did not perform as well, although it was popular in Britain.

=== Contract with Rank ===
In July 1946, Lockwood signed a six-year contract with Rank to make two movies a year. The first of these was Hungry Hill (1947), an expensive adaptation of the novel by Daphne du Maurier which was not the expected success at the box office. More popular was Jassy (1947), the seventh biggest hit at the British box office in 1947. It was the last of "official" Gainsborough melodramas – the studio had come under the control of J. Arthur Rank who disliked the genre. Filmink argued Lockwood's career never recovered from the death of Ted Black in 1948.

She was a warden in The White Unicorn (1947), a melodrama from the team of Harold Huth and John Corfield. Rank wanted to star her in a film about Mary Magdalene but Lockwood was unhappy with the script. She refused to appear in Roses for Her Pillow (which became Once Upon a Dream) and was put on suspension. "I was sick of getting mediocre parts and poor scripts", she later wrote. "Since 1945 I had been sick of it... there had been little or no improvement to me in the films I was being offered." She later said "I was having fun being a rebel." In December 1947 Kine Weekly wrote "Margaret Lockwood remains the First Lady of the British screen yet for sheer personal popularity she has nothing on Anna Neagle".

During her suspension she went on a publicity tour for Rank. She also appeared in an acclaimed TV production of Pygmalion (1948). then went off suspension when she made Look Before You Love (1948), a comedy for Corfield and Huth.

Lockwood had a change of pace with the comedy Cardboard Cavalier (1949), with Lockwood playing Nell Gwyn. The film was a critical and box-office disappointment. "I was terribly distressed when I read the press notices of the film", wrote Lockwood.

That same year, Lockwood was announced to play Becky Sharp in a film adaptation of Vanity Fair but it was not made.

Lockwood was in the melodrama Madness of the Heart (1949), but the film was not a particular success. When a proposed film about Elisabeth of Austria was cancelled, she returned to the stage in a record-breaking national tour of Noël Coward's Private Lives (1949) and then played the title role in productions of J. M. Barrie's Peter Pan in 1949 and 1950. She also performed in a pantomime of Cinderella for the Royal Film performance with Jean Simmons; Lockwood called this "the jolliest show in which I have ever taken part."

She returned to film-making after an 18-month absence to star in Highly Dangerous (1950), a comic thriller in the vein of Lady Vanishes, written expressly for her by Eric Ambler and directed by Roy Ward Baker. It was not popular. Rank was to put her in an adaptation of Ann Veronica by H. G. Wells but the film was postponed. She turned down the female lead in The Browning Version, and a proposed sequel to The Wicked Lady, The Wicked Lady's Daughter, was never made.

Eventually her contract with Rank ended and she played Eliza Doolittle in George Bernard Shaw's Pygmalion at the Edinburgh Festival of 1951.

=== Herbert Wilcox ===
In 1952, Lockwood signed a two picture a year contract with Herbert Wilcox at $112,000 a year, making her the best paid actress in British films. Lockwood said Wilcox and his wife Anna Neagle promised from signing the contract "I was never allowed to forget that I was a really bright and dazzling star on their horizon. They were going to look after me as no one else had done before. They did. And I loved it."

The association began well with Trent's Last Case (1952) with Michael Wilding and Orson Welles, which was popular. She appeared on TV in Ann Veronica and another TV adaptation of the Shaw play Captain Brassbound's Conversion (1953).

Her next two films for Wilcox were commercial disappointments: Laughing Anne (1953) and Trouble in the Glen (1954). She made no more films with Wilcox who called her "a director's joy who can shade a performance or a character with computer accuracy", but he admitted their collaboration "did not come off."

Lockwood returned to the stage in Spider's Web (1954) by Agatha Christie, expressly written for her.

She then appeared in Cast a Dark Shadow (1955) with Dirk Bogarde for director Lewis Gilbert. Gilbert later said "It was reasonably successful, but, by then, Margaret had been in several really bad films and her name on a picture was rather counter-productive."

== Later career ==
=== Television ===
As her popularity waned in the post war years, she returned to occasional performances on the West End stage and appeared on television; her television debut was in 1948 when she played Eliza Doolittle.

She was in a BBC adaptation of Christie's Spider's Web (1955), Janet Green's Murder Mistaken (1956), (Note: Murder Mistaken was originally a play by Janet Green that was made into the 1955 film Cast a Dark Shadow in which Lockwood appeared) Dodie Smith's Call It a Day (1956) and Arnold Bennett's The Great Adventure (1958).

She had the lead in a TV series The Royalty (1957–1958) and appeared regularly on TV anthology series. She played an aging West End star attempting a comeback in The Human Jungle with Herbert Lom (1965). She starred in the series The Flying Swan (1965).

In 1969 she starred as barrister Julia Stanford in the TV play Justice is a Woman. This inspired the Yorkshire Television series Justice, which ran for three seasons (39 episodes) from 1971 to 1974, and featured her real-life partner John Stone as fictional boyfriend Dr Ian Moody. Lockwood's role as the feisty Harriet Peterson won her Best Actress Awards from the TV Times (1971) and The Sun (1973).

In 1975, film director Bryan Forbes persuaded her out of an apparent retirement from feature films to play the role of the Stepmother in her second last feature film The Slipper and the Rose.

=== Stage ===
Her subsequent long-running West End hits include an all-star production of Oscar Wilde's An Ideal Husband (1965–66, in which she played the villainous Mrs Cheveley), W. Somerset Maugham's Lady Frederick (1970), Relative Values (Noël Coward revival, 1973) and the thrillers Signpost to Murder (1962) and Double Edge (1975).

Her last professional appearance was as Queen Alexandra in Royce Ryton's stage play Motherdear (Ambassadors Theatre, 1980).

=== Legacy ===
Margaret Lockwood was appointed a Commander of the Order of the British Empire (CBE) in the 1981 New Year Honours.

She was the subject on an episode of This Is Your Life in December 1963. She was a guest on the radio show Desert Island Discs on 25 April 1951.

== Personal life and death ==
Lockwood married Rupert Leon, whom she had met in her teens and secretly married in 1937 when she turned 21; they divorced in 1950. She lived her final years in seclusion in Kingston upon Thames, dying on 15 July 1990 at age 73 at the Cromwell Hospital from cirrhosis of the liver, though she was not a drinker. Her body was cremated at Putney Vale Crematorium. She had a daughter, the actress Julia Lockwood (née Margaret Julia Leon).

== Filmography ==
Year	Title	Role	Director	Notes	Ref
1934	Lorna Doone	Annie Ridd	Basil Dean		
1935	The Case of Gabriel Perry	Mildred Perry	Albert de Courville		
1935	Honours Easy	Ann	Herbert Brenon		
1935	Man of the Moment	Vera	Monty Banks		
1935	Midshipman Easy	Donna Agnes	Carol Reed		
1935	Someday	Emily	Michael Powell		
1936	Jury's Evidence	Betty Stanton	Ralph Ince		
1936	The Amateur Gentleman	Georgina Huntstanton	Thornton Freeland		
1936	The Beloved Vagabond	Blanquette	Curtis Bernhardt		
1936	Irish for Luck	Ellen O'Hare	Arthur B. Woods		
1937	The Street Singer	Jenny Green	Jean de Marguenat		
1937	Who's Your Lady Friend?	Mimi	Carol Reed		
1937	Doctor Syn	Imogene Clegg	Roy William Neill		
1937	Melody and Romance	Margaret Williams	Maurice Elvey		
1938	Owd Bob	Jeannie McAdam	Robert Stevenson	To the Victor	
1938	Bank Holiday	Catherine Lawrence	Carol Reed	Three on a Weekend	
1938	The Lady Vanishes	Iris Henderson	Alfred Hitchcock		
1939	Susannah of the Mounties	Vicky Standing	Walter Lang, William A. Seiter		
1939	A Girl Must Live	Leslie James	Carol Reed		
1939	Rulers of the Sea	Mary Shaw	Frank Lloyd		
1940	The Stars Look Down	Jenny Sunley	Carol Reed		
1940	The Girl in the News	Anne Graham	Carol Reed		
1940	Night Train to Munich	Anna Bomasch	Carol Reed		
1941	Quiet Wedding	Janet Royd	Anthony Asquith		
1942	Alibi	Helene Ardouin	Brian Desmond Hurst		
1943	The Man in Grey	Hesther Shaw	Leslie Arliss		
1943	Dear Octopus	Penny Randolph	Harold French		
1944	Give Us the Moon	Nina	Val Guest		
1944	Love Story	Lissa Campbell	Leslie Arliss	A Lady Surrenders	
1945	A Place of One's Own	Annette	Bernard Knowles		
1945	I'll Be Your Sweetheart	Edie Story	Val Guest		
1945	The Wicked Lady	Barbara Worth	Leslie Arliss		
1946	Bedelia	Bedelia Carrington	Lance Comfort		
1947	Hungry Hill	Fanny Rosa	Brian Desmond Hurst		
1947	Jassy	Jassy Woodroofe	Bernard Knowles		
1947	The White Unicorn	Lucy	Bernard Knowles	Bad Sister	
1948	Pygmalion	Eliza Doolittle		television film	
1948	Look Before You Love	Ann Markham	Harold Huth		
1949	Cardboard Cavalier	Nell Gwynne	Walter Forde		
1949	Madness of the Heart	Lydia Garth	Charles Bennett		
1950	Highly Dangerous	Frances Gray	Roy Ward Baker		
1952	Trent's Last Case	Margaret Manderson	Herbert Wilcox		
1953	Captain Brassbound's Conversion	Lady Cicely Wayneflete	Dennis Vance	television film	
1953	Laughing Anne	Laughing Anne	Herbert Wilcox		
1954	Trouble in the Glen	Marissa Mengues	Herbert Wilcox		
1955	Spider's Web	Clarissa Hailsham-Brown	Wallace Douglas	television film	
1955	Cast a Dark Shadow	Freda Jeffries	Lewis Gilbert		
1956	Murder Mistaken	Freda Jeffries	Campbell Logan	television film	
1956	Call It a Day	Dorothy Hilton	Hal Burton	television film	
1965	The Human Jungle			TV series	
1976	The Slipper and the Rose	Stepmother	Bryan Forbes		

=== Unmade films ===
- adaptation of Rob Roy (1939) with Will Fyffe and Michael Redgrave
- adaptation of The Blue Lagoon (1939) with Richard Greene
- The Reluctant Widow – announced 1946
- Mary Magdalene, written by Clemence Dane – Lockwood said she was "really looking forward" to making the film in 1947.
- Trial for Murder (1940s) – proposed Hollywood film from Mark Robson

== Theatre credits ==
- Margaret Hamilton, Family Affairs, Ambassadors Theatre and Phoenix Theatre, London, and other venues, 1934–35
- Helene Ferber, Repayment, Arts Theatre, London, 1936
- The Stars Look Down, Cambridge Arts Theatre, 1940
- Amanda Prynne, Private Lives, Bristol Hippodrome, 1949
- Peter Pan, Peter Pan, Royal Court Theatre, Liverpool, 1950
- Peter Pan, Bristol Hippodrome, 1949–50
- Peter Pan, Peter Pan, Grand Theatre, Leeds, Empire Theatre, Sunderland, and other venues, 1950–51
- Eliza Doolittle, Pygmalion, Bristol Hippodrome, Opera House, Manchester, and other venues, 1951–52
- Clarissa Hailsham-Brown, Spider's Web, Savoy Theatre, London, Theatre Royal, Nottingham, and other venues, 1954–56
- Dinah Holland, Subway in the Sky, Grand Theatre, Hull, Savoy Theatre, London, and other venues, 1957
- Sally Seymour, And Suddenly it's Spring, Duke of York's Theatre, London, New Theatre, Oxford, Bristol Hippodrome, 1959–60
- Barbara Martin, Milk and Honey, Theatre Royal, Newcastle upon Tyne, Alexandra Theatre, Birmingham, and other venues, 1961
- Sally Thomas, Signpost to Murder, Cambridge Theatre, London, New Theatre, Oxford, and other venues, 1961–63
- Caroline, Every Other Evening, New Theatre, Oxford and Phoenix Theatre, London, 1964
- Mrs Cheveley, An Ideal Husband, Alexandra Theatre, Birmingham, Golders Green Hippodrome, and other venues, 1965–67
- Claire Williams, The Others, Strand Theatre, London, 1967
- Diane, On a Foggy Day, St Martin's Theatre, London, Cambridge Arts Theatre, and other venues, 1969
- Lady Frederick Berolles, Lady Frederick, Duke of York's Theatre, London, Vaudeville Theatre, London, Bristol Hippodrome, and other venues, 1970–71
- Felicity, Countess of Marshwood, Relative Values, Ashcroft Theatre, Croydon and Westminster Theatre, London, 1973
- Helen Galt, Double Edge, Vaudeville Theatre and Richmond Theatre, London, and other venues, 1975–76
- Maud Caragnani / Carlotta Grey, Suite in Two Keys, Richmond Theatre, London, Ashcroft Theatre, Croydon, and other venues, 1978
- The Princess of Wales (Alix), Motherdear, Ambassadors Theatre, London and Birmingham Repertory Theatre, 1980

== Awards ==
- 1946 – Daily Mail National Film Awards Most Outstanding British actress during the war years
- 1947 – Daily Mail National Film Awards Best Film Actress of the year
- 1948 – Daily Mail National Film Awards Best Film Actress of the year in Jassy
- 1955 – BAFTA nomination for Best British Actress in Cast a Dark Shadow
- 1961 – Daily Mirror Television Award
- 1971 – TV Times, Best Actress Award
- 1973 – The Sun, Best Actress Award

== Box-office popularity ==
Various polls of exhibitors consistently listed Lockwood among the most popular stars of her era:

- 1943 – 7th most popular British star in Britain
- 1944 – 6th most popular British star in Britain
- 1945 – 3rd most popular British star in Britain
- 1946 – 10th most popular star in Australia, 3rd most popular star and 2nd most popular British star in Britain
- 1947 – 4th most popular star and 3rd most popular British star in Britain
- 1948 – 3rd most popular star and 2nd most popular British star in Britain, most popular female star in Canada
- 1949 – 5th most popular British star in Britain
