= Royston Morley =

John Royston Morley (25 August 1912 – 14 October 1991) was a British television producer, director and writer. He was among the earliest television producers, and also trained new producers for the BBC and in Australia.

== Life and career ==
Morley was born in Kidderminster, Worcestershire, England.

His early work for BBC television, beginning in 1937, included a regular slot in Cecil Madden's "Picture Page", a magazine programme of general and topical interest. In 1937 Morley married a BBC colleague, Isa Benzie. They had one daughter. Morley added television drama to his responsibilities, and produced or directed abbreviated versions of plays by Shakespeare, Wilde, Ibsen, John Webster, J.B. Priestley and P.G. Wodehouse among others. In April 1939 he produced a studio presentation of the Sadler's Wells Ballet in The Rake's Progress.

The fledgling television service was taken off the air during the Second World War, and Morley moved to radio, writing as well as producing programmes. When BBC television returned after the war, Morley resumed his pre-war responsibilities, producing "Picture Page" and a wide range of drama, both classic, such as Pygmalion and King Lear, and modern works by Thornton Wilder, Eugene O'Neill, Luigi Pirandello, Jean Cocteau and others. His own play, The Guilty Party was broadcast in 1953. In addition to directing, Morley was also a trainer. The BBC was interested in recruiting potential directors from people with a theatrical background, and among those who comprised what became known as "Morley's Army" were Kenneth Tynan, Tony Richardson and Peter Cotes.

In 1956 Morley went to Australia to train staff for the Australian Broadcasting Corporation in Sydney. His contribution to the ABC at this time has been described as crucial. While in Australia he directed productions of An Enemy of the People (1958) and Hamlet (1959).

After returning to Britain in the 1960s, Morley produced the long-running BBC television series Dr Finlay's Casebook, followed by two other drama series in the early 1970s, Brett and The Regiment. These were his last work for the BBC. In the 1970s he worked for the commercial station Associated Television, and in 1980 he directed a few episodes of the soap opera Crossroads. As well as his television work, Morley directed Pirandello's play, Six Characters in Search of an Author at the Arts Theatre in 1954, and the 1961 cinema film, Attempt to Kill, based on an Edgar Wallace detective story.

Morley died on 14 October 1991 in Weston-super-Mare, Somerset, England.

== Select credits ==
- Pygmalion (1948)
- The Admirable Crichton (1950)
- Point of Return (1958)
- The Gladys Half-Hour (1958)
- Chance of a Ghost (1958)
- An Enemy of the People (1958)
- Sixty Point Bold (1959)
- The Seagull (1959)
- Hamlet (1959)
