= Hilton London Hyde Park =

London, England hotel built in 1907

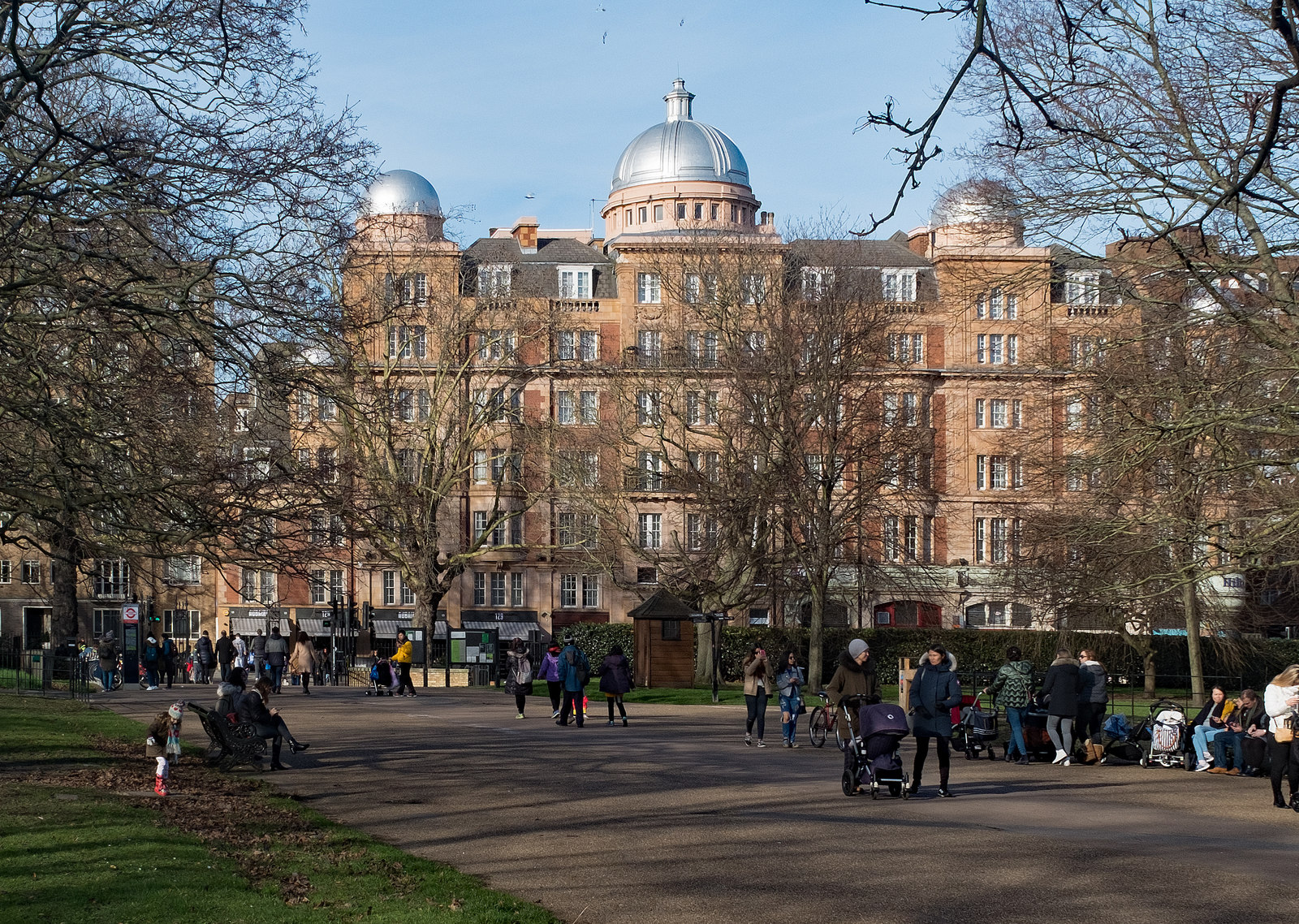
- Hilton London Hyde Park
- Interactive map of the Hilton London Hyde Park area

General information
- Classification: 4 stars
- Location: London, W2; United Kingdom
- Coordinates: 51°30′37.2″N 0°11′15.1″W
- Opening: 1907
- Management: Hilton Hotels

Other information
- Number of rooms: 136

Website
- Official Website

The Hilton London Hyde Park is a historic hotel on Bayswater Road, overlooking Hyde Park and Kensington Gardens in Central London.

== History ==
The Coburg Court Hotel opened in 1907. It was renamed the Coburg Hotel in the early 1960s, and then the Hilton London Hyde Park in July 1999.

The Coburg Hotel was used as a filming location in Alfred Hitchcock's 1972 thriller Frenzy. Characters Richard Blaney and Babs Milligan check into the Coburg as "Mr. and Mrs. Oscar Wilde." Filming took place at the hotel in September 1971. The interiors of the Coburg Hotel were mostly recreated at Pinewood Studios, except for the policemen's point-of-view shot showing the fire escape, which was filmed by assistant director Colin M. Brewer from a fifth-floor room.

== See also ==
- Hotels in London
- London Hilton on Park Lane
