= Nan Marriott-Watson =

British character actress (1899 – 1982)

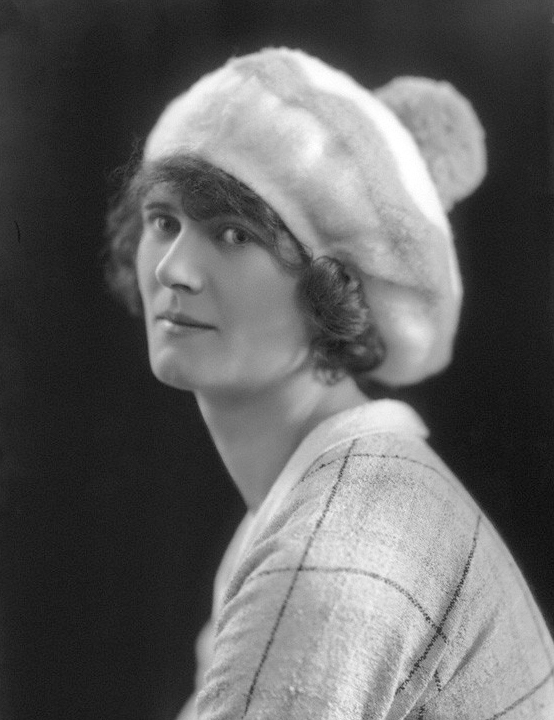
Nan Marriott-Watson in 1922

Hannah Margaret Marriott-Watson (31 August 1899 – 28 August 1982), known as Nan Marriott-Watson, was a British character actress and Broadway theatre performer.

== Early life and career ==
Marriot-Watson was born Hannah Margaret Marriott-Watson in 1899 in West Derby, Lancashire.

She was the original choice to play soap opera icon Ena Sharples in Coronation Street, and she appeared in the second unaired pilot episode in 1960. Nita Valerie was also cast in the role. The part was recast with Violet Carson prior to the recording of the first episode.

Notably, the actress earlier originated another core soap character, appearing as matriarch Doris Archer in the pilot episodes of The Archers in 1950. This character was also recast, with Gwen Berryman going on to play Doris for almost three decades.

She played Norah Gillingham in the soap opera Crossroads from 1967 to 1969.

== Death ==
Marriott-Watson died on 28 August 1982, aged 82, in Puttenham, Surrey.
