= Sustainable film production =

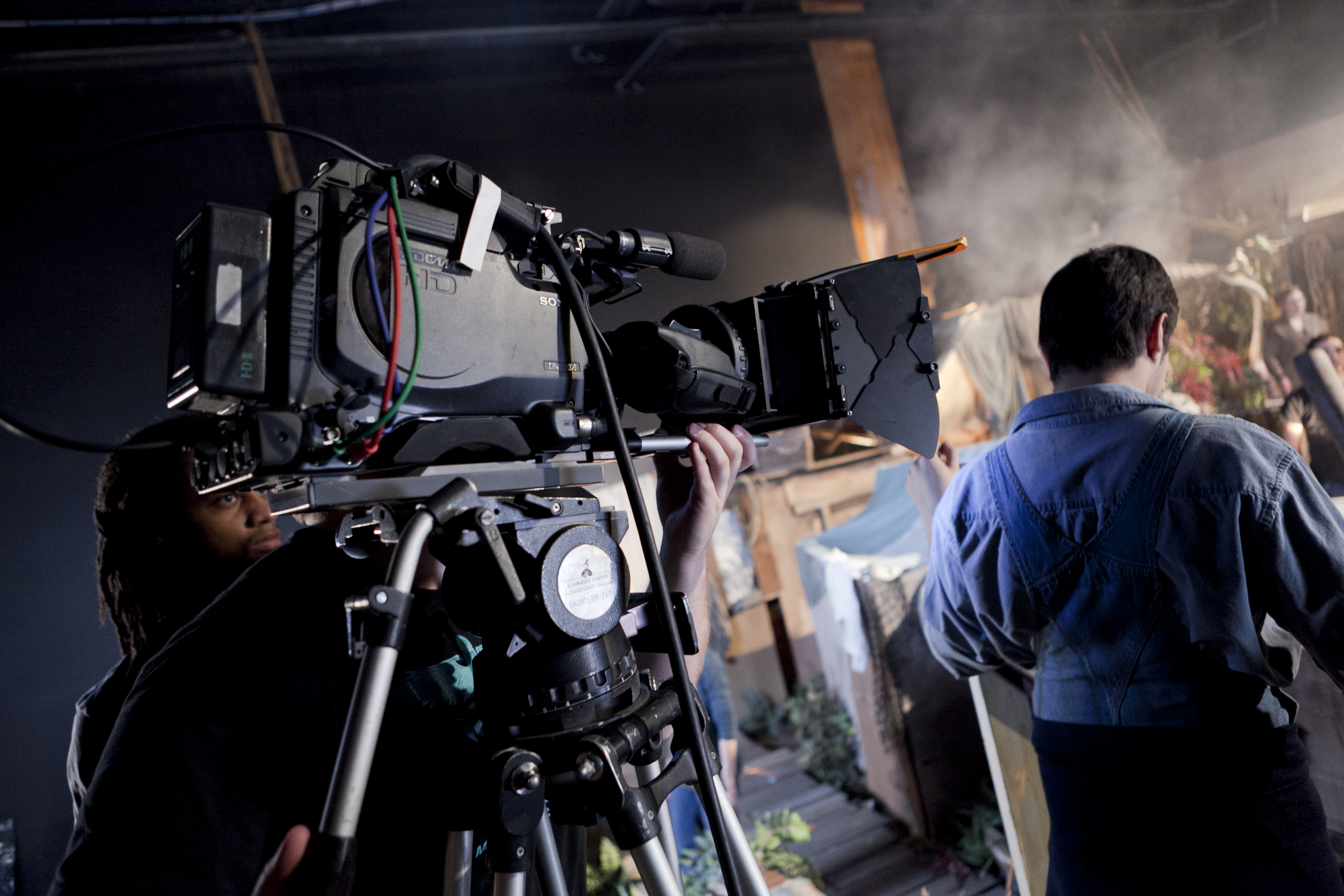
Behind the scenes at VFS Film Production.

Sustainable film production is the concept of film production with particular concern for environmental, economic, and social issues. Sustainability in film production incorporates socially and environmentally responsible decision making into the pre-production and production of the film. It involves sustainable development principles at all levels of filmmaking and is best accomplished in a unified manner with collaboration and cooperation from all departments or participants in making the film. The sustainability of the film production should start at the launch of the project, and involve all of the key stakeholders including the director, film producer, production or costume designer, cast, and crew. Sustainability can be included in all departments of film and media making, including content creation. Writing about sustainability, or including environmental issues in a film is sometimes referred to as Climate Storytelling.

Film production can be sustainable by working with the triple bottom line of environmental, social, and economic factors. Environmentally, for example, by reducing carbon emissions produced by travel arrangements; selecting vehicles with less CO^{2} emissions, improved route planning, carpooling or adopting a more sustainable means of transport can help reduce the environmental footprint. Socially, by establishing clear guidelines for minimizing the impact of the filming schedule on local communities (one way this can be achieved by limiting hours of work and engaging early with communities about the logistical effects on the area) and by integrating social enterprising suppliers in the production's supply chain. Economically, the film production can be intentional about helping communities’ benefit from film activities: for example, by employing local residents and paying them appropriately or utilizing local props, extras and catering. Green shooting encompasses pre-production, production, post-production, distribution, and consumption, advocating for the integration of eco-consultants to ensure compliance with sustainable practices across departments. Digitization efforts, in pre-production especially, aim to reduce paper use and increase energy efficiency and post-production continues these efforts with digital technologies that further reduce the footprint. Green shooting additionally contains concepts outside of the environmental aspect, making changes in the distribution of resources, equity, and social justice.

== History ==
The discussion of sustainability in film began in the early 1990s, as reported in The Hollywood Reporter and Variety. However, the attention was demonstrated in environmental content, environmental activism, and the philanthropy of celebrities rather than the production operations.

In Canada, British Columbia formalized its sustainable production efforts in 2006 through the Reel Green initiative, a "resource centre with a collection of best practices to help productions reduce their environmental impacts and improve their overall environmental footprint". Following those initiatives in Canada, vendors such as Green Spark Group (2014) and Keep it Green Recycling (2017) have emerged to help productions with recycling and greenhouse gas accounting.

In the UK, the British Standard 8909 was announced at the Cannes Film Festival in 2011 to improve the British film industry's environmental, social, and economic impact after seeing how BS8901 helped the British events sector.

Globally, many film studios have adopted sustainability initiatives, including the "Big Five": Universal Pictures, Walt Disney Pictures, Warner Bros., Columbia Pictures, and Paramount Pictures. As well as large television production studios like CBS.

The global dedication to sustainable production by the industry has cultivated in the Sustainable Production Forum annually in Vancouver to gather for collaboration and dedication on sustainable film production. Topics discussed at the forum have included fleet transport in the film industry, compostable plastics and packaging, diversity in film, and the future of energy.

== Awards for sustainable production ==
=== Environmental Media Association ===
The Environmental Media Association (EMA) has a "Green Seal" for various categories, one of which being production. The EMA Green Seal recognizes programs honoring progress in sustainable production. The score for production practices is evaluated on a scale of 200 points, with 75 points being the lowest threshold to receive the Green Seal and 125 needed to receive the Gold Seal label. Evaluations are made on best practices in categories such as: production, accounting, art, assistant directors, camera, catering, construction, costume & wardrobe, craft service, electric, greens, grip, hair, locations, make-up, props, set decoration, special effects, sound, and transportation.

=== Sustainable Production Forum ===
The Sustainable Production Forum is the first and only forum to bring together leaders of the film industry to discuss sustainable practices in production, rather than simply environmental friendly content. This forum gives away two awards annually: Sustainable Production Impact and Sustainable Production Champion. The Sustainable Production Impact Award recognizes productions that "have had measurable reduction in greenhouse gas emissions or waste diversion and contributed positively to the local community". The Sustainable Production Champion award recognizes individuals that "go above and beyond to advance sustainable production in the motion picture industry".

== Impacts of film productions ==
=== Resource consumption ===
The production process generates a variety of emissions and pollutants, including greenhouse gasses, air pollutants, and chemical waste. Aspects like transportation, energy use, and on-set activities contribute to these emissions, which lead to climate change and air quality deterioration. The usage of electricity during filming and post-production contributes substantially to the environmental footprint of film production, a typical tentpole film production consumes enough energy to power New York Times Square for five days. Film production sites are also heavily reliant on energy, water, and raw material consumption. The average production with a budget of $70 million will produce a substantial carbon footprint of 3,370 metric tons. Other factors that can attribute to this emission is the process of set construction, equipment operation, and transportation. Transporting crew, equipment, and cast to remote filming locations significantly increases fuel consumption by 11,478 times of an average car tank, while the air miles equate to 11 one-way trips from Earth to the moon. Another example that contributes to this emission is the number of cameras being utilized, with a larger production scale usually resulting in higher carbon emissions.

== Examples of sustainable film production ==
Several film productions have been able to successfully implement sustainable practices in order to reduce their environmental footprint. Initiatives such as alternative fuels, waste diversion programs, and material reuse have demonstrated significant reductions in carbon emissions and waste generation.

=== The X-Files ===
During the X-Files season 10 reboot, 21st Century Fox utilized alternative fuels and practiced proper recycling which diverted more than 81% of its total waste from landfills. In addition, 100% of the aluminum and steel used in set construction was recycled. A total of 33 tons of CO_{2} emissions were avoided, as well as 45,740 plastic bottles. The switch from bottles to jugs alone saved production by $35,000.

=== Fifty Shades Freed ===
Fifty Shades Freed is the third movie in the "Fifty Shades" phenomenon. The film was filmed mainly in Vancouver, BC and the production worked hard to reduce their footprint. To begin, Fifty Shades Freed was shot consecutively with its predecessor Fifty Shades Darker which helped the production combine and reuse materials. Also, the crew eliminated plastic bottles and saved about 80,000 single use bottles. The set contained a comprehensive recycling and composing program, and had a dedicated Sustainability Production Assistant to take the point on that initiative which resulted in 75% of waste diverted from landfills. Set dressing and materials were donated to Habitat for Humanity ReStore, Great Northern Way Scene Shop, MakerLabs, and Squamish Arts Council at wrap. The Universal Pictures’ Assets Department worked with the Sustainable Lock Up in Vancouver and Recycled Movie Sets in Los Angeles to recirculate the stored sets from the trilogy for reuse and donation to local film schools, non-profits, and other productions. In total, 288 tons of set materials were donated to be reused and 99% of the trilogy's sets were kept out of landfills. Fifty Shades Freed was a recipient of a 2016 EMA Green Seal Award.

=== Downton Abbey ===
When filming in the United Kingdom, the Downton Abbey film's production team did a number of things to reduce their footprint including sending call sheets, scripts, and production documents electronically, no disposable food service products on site, and recycling/composting. In addition, Carnival Films stored sets from the six seasons of the television series Downton Abbey that production was able to re-use or re-purpose to save the consumption of new materials. Disposables were also saved by issuing the crew reusable water bottles and the sound department used reusable batteries. At the conclusion of production, the costume department donated $800 worth of fabric and materials to the Wimbledon College of Arts. Storage boxes and hangers were donated to local sewing and flower shops and set decoration donated produce to The Hounslow Urban Farm to be used to feed animals. Downton Abbey received a 2019 EMA Green Seal.

=== Yesterday ===
Yesterday implemented a strict-no idling policy to reduce CO^{2} emissions and many of the crew utilized public transportation. In addition to the sustainable practices, the set decoration team incorporated green messaging on the posters on the school set. The Yesterday team donated 2,860lbs of excess catering and set decoration to City Harvest London, feeding 2,383 in need. The construction department donated $6,000 worth of leather tapestries to a firefighting charity. Costumes and props were donated to Dress for Success and British Heart Foundation. Yesterday received a 2019 EMA Gold Seal.

=== Call of the Wild ===
In Disney's 2020 adaption of Call of the Wild, with the guidance of sustainability manager Adrienne Pfieffer, the production implemented various initiatives to manage materials and waste effectively. These initiatives resulted in approximately 82% of materials being diverted from landfills, which significantly reduced the film's overall carbon footprint. Small changes around the set made a significant difference in sustainability outcomes. Proper food waste management practices prevented 1,515 pounds of food from ending up in landfills. Disney also opted to make the sets of "Call of the Wild" permanent in order to reuse them in future projects.

=== Jurassic World: Rebirth ===
In this new addition to the Jurassic franchise, Jurassic World: Rebirth was able to practice sustainability thanks to the team led by Mandy Cayford at Sky Studios Elstree. Cayford and her team were able to collaborate with Universal Pictures to reduce waste by helping invest in green technology such as reusable small and large batteries, using electric instead of gas-powered cars to avoid the burning the fossil fuels, reusable dishware, recycling and composting as much as possible, and reusing materials used on previous productions. The set was able to avoid disposing over 100,000 single-use items by having reusable dishware throughout the entire production which could range from around 4,500 to 7,500 pounds of trash.

== Environmental production guides ==
=== Green Production Guide ===
The Green Production Guide was developed by the Producers Guild of America Foundation and PGAGreen.org with primary support from NBCUniversal, Paramount Global, Amblin Partners, Sony Pictures Entertainment, HBO, Netflix, Amazon Studios, Disney, Warner Bros. Discovery, 20th Century Studios, CBS & Participant Media.

The Green Production Guide includes a comprehensive database of vendors including info about their services, experience, and locations. The website additionally offers a Production Environmental Accounting Report (PEAR) that can be downloaded to aid production in analyzing their carbon footprint and the Production Environmental Actions Checklist (PEACH), which clarifies best practices in the industry.

=== Reel Green ===
Reel Green offers free carbon footprint literacy courses to members of the motion picture industry. The 6-hour workshops leave participants with knowledge on how to "have a sound understanding of the science of climate change, understand how to act to reduce their impact, recognize the impact that production has on the environment, and have knowledge of the tools and techniques to lessen this impact". They offer Sustainable Production Training, and Carbon Calculator Training workshops online, taught by Production Sustainability Manager, Noah Rogers (Disney, A24).

Universal Filmed Entertainment Group recently launched their new initiative titled the "GreenerLight Program," which is designed to embed sustainable practices throughout the entire filmmaking process. It will also examine the content and behaviors onscreen through an environmentally friendly lens. All films will include a sustainability plan, and will continue focus on areas such as energy efficiency, fuel-use reduction and donations of food and set material.
