= John Bonett =

English author

John Bonett was the pen name of John Hubert Arthur Coulson (10 August 1906 – 21 January 1989), an English writer, best known for numerous mystery and detective novels written in collaboration with his wife, Emery Bonett.

He was born in Longbenton, North Tyneside and educated at Durham School. In addition to his writing work, after serving in the Admiralty between 1940 and 1945, he worked as a banker from 1924 to 1937, a company secretary from 1937 to 1939, and finally as a sales promotion executive, from 1945 to 1963.

He had one sister, (Desirée Rachel) Helen Coulson, born 12 June 1905. She died in a car accident on the M4, west of London in 1970.

He lived in Spain with his wife during his later years.

A collection of manuscripts is held at the University of Sheffield.

Penguin book cover blurb: ‘'John, besides having imagination and plot-sense, has also grammar, spelling and a sense of humour and from the time they met he has done most of the spadework on his wife’s stories.'’
