= Evil Eye =

Evil Eye may refer to:

- Evil eye, a look that is believed by many cultures to be able to cause injury or bad luck for the person at whom it is directed

== Film ==
- The Evil Eye (1913 film), an American silent short starring Mary Ryan
- The Evil Eye (1917 film), an American silent feature by George Melford
- The Evil Eye (1920 serial), an American silent action film series by J. Gordon Cooper and Wally Van
- The Evil Eye (1937 film), a Belgian feature by Charles Dekeukeleire
- The Evil Eye (1963 film) or The Girl Who Knew Too Much, an Italian giallo by Mario Bava
- Evil Eyes, a 2004 American horror film by Mark Atkins
- Evil Eye (2020 film), a 2020 American horror film from Blumhouse Productions and Purple Pebble Pictures

== Television episodes ==
- "The Evil Eye" (Happy Days)
- "The Evil Eye" (Inhumanoids)
- "Evil Eye" (Seeing Things)
- "Evil Eye" (Taggart)
- "Evil Eyes" (72 Hours: True Crime)

== Songs ==
- "Evil Eye" (Franz Ferdinand song) by Franz Ferdinand from Right Thoughts, Right Words, Right Action
- "Evil Eye" (KT Tunstall song), a 2016 song by KT Tunstall from KIN
- "Evil Eye", a song by Fu Manchu from The Action Is Go
- "Evil Eye", a song by Beady Eye from BE
- "Evil Eyes", a song by Dio from The Last in Line
- "Evil Eye", a song by Yngwie Malmsteen from Rising Force
- "Evil Eye", a song by Takida from ...Make You Breathe
- "Evil Eye", a song by Edward W. Hardy from Three Pieces Inspired by Edgar Allan Poe
- "Evil Eyes", a song by Styx from Man of Miracles
- "Evil Eye", a song by Black Sabbath from Cross Purposes
- "Evil Eye", a song by Motörhead from Bad Magic
- "Evil Eye", a song by Billy Idol from Devil's Playground
- "Evil Eye", a song by MIKE from Disco! (album)
- "Evil Eyes", a song by Architects from The Sky, the Earth & All Between

== Other uses ==
- "The Evil Eye" (1830 short fiction) by Mary Shelley
- Evil Eye (comics), a fictional disembodied eye in Whoopee!! comics
- Evil Eye of Avalon or the Evil Eye, a fictional magical artifact in the Marvel Universe inspired by Arthurian legend
- The Evil Eye (Ravenloft), a 1996 adventure module for Advanced Dungeons & Dragons
- An Evil Eye, a 2011 novel by Jason Goodwin
- The "Evil Eye" Yōkai from the 2021 Japanese manga, Dandadan

== See also ==
- Brown Eye, Evil Eye, a 1967 drama film
- Two Evil Eyes, a 1990 horror film
