= Elen Roger Jones =

Welsh actress and teacher

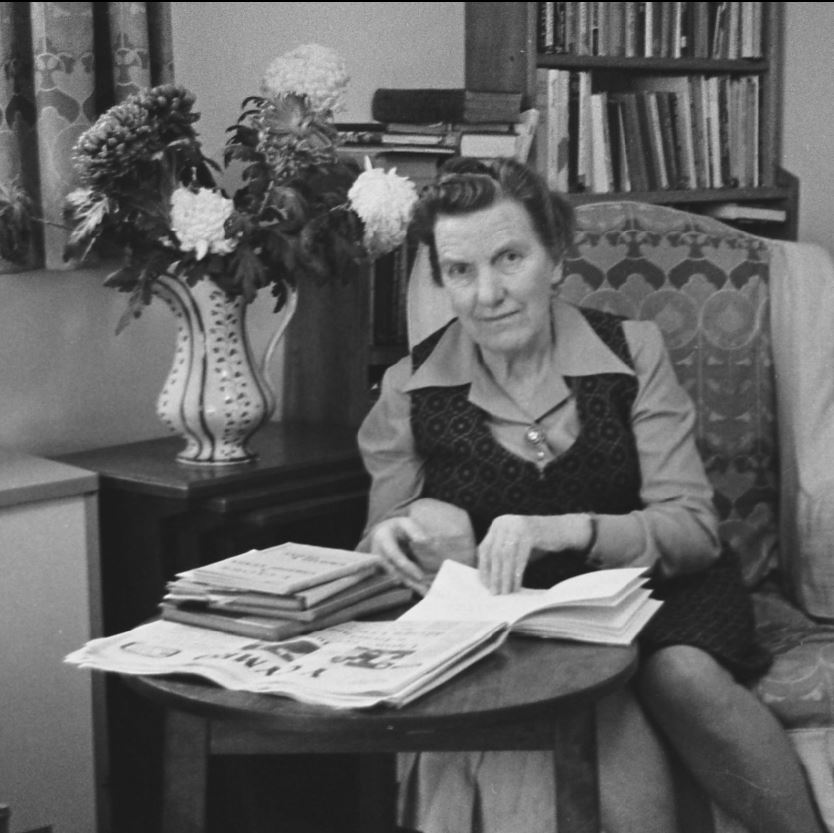
- Born: Elen Griffith; 27 August 1908; Marian-Glas, Anglesey, Wales
- Died: 15 April 1999 (aged 90)
- Resting place: Llaneugrad Church
- Occupations: Teacher, actress
- Years active: 1960–1989
- Spouse: Gwilym Roger Jones (m. 1938; died 1988)
- Children: 2
- Relatives: Hugh Griffith (brother)

Elen Roger Jones (27 August 1908 – 15 April 1999) was a Welsh actress and teacher.

== Early life and education ==
Elen was born in Marian-Glas (Llaneugrad), Anglesey, the daughter of William Griffith (1873–1935), (who was the Anglesey Education Committee Secretary) and his wife Mary (née Williams, d.1961). She was her father's first child and her mother's second. She had an older brother, Thomas, from her mother's previous marriage (which ended due to Thomas' father dying during a storm at sea a few months before Thomas' birth). Elen's younger sister, Siarlot, was born two years later (1910–1993), followed by her brother Hugh Griffith (1912–1980), who became a world-famous actor, winning an Oscar for his part in the movie Ben-Hur.

Jones was educated at Llanallgo school, which was 3/4 mile from her home. She, along with another pupil, Gwilym Roger Jones, the minister's son, had the opportunity to sit a scholarship exam to continue their education at Llangefni County School, which she was able to do. After winning the advanced certificate, she studied for two years at Bangor Normal College At the age of 20 she passed her final examinations and gained a teaching position.

== Personal life ==
In 1938, she married Gwilym Roger Jones (1907–1988), a banker who had just gained a position in Ruthin. Just over a year after settling in Ruthin, Elen gave birth to a daughter, Meri Rhiannon. Towards the end of the Second World War, she gave birth to a son, William Roger.

Elen and Gwilym joined Capel Bethania, with Elen producing and performing and Gwilym in the role of secretary or treasurer. Elen was the main force behind establishing the Ruthin Drama Society 1950.

In 1954 the family moved to Bala for Gwilym's work. Elen competed in the local eisteddfodau. She eventually began judging the acting and recital competitions, and later became a judge at the National Eisteddfod. In the next two years, the family lived in Abersoch and Amlwch, before returning to her home town of Marian-Glas.

== Interests ==
Throughout her life, Jones was interested in music and drama. Her love began for drama began after seeing her first play, The Hunchback of Notre-Dame, performed in the Old School, a building which hosted plays, competitive meetings and concerts. It is still a focal point of the village today. On the wall of the building is a plaque commemorating her brother, Hugh Griffith.

Jones' interest in music was encouraged at home after her parents purchased a piano. She attended tonic sol-fa classes on Sundays in the Capel Paradwys, Llanallgo, where she practiced singing. When she went to Bangor in 1926, she joined the university's music club as well as the College Choral Society.

== Career ==
=== Teacher ===
After her final exams, Jones gained a teaching position at Llanbedr-goch School. She then worked at Amlwch Elementary School. In 1930 she became a teacher at her former primary school, Llanallgo. After her marriage in 1938, she only worked as a supply teacher.

=== Actress ===
Jones was widely known as an actress in stage, radio and television within Wales. The Theatr Fach in Llangefni was an institution of extreme importance to her; she first performed there in 1960. She remained devoted to this theatre for forty years. She performed in plays such as Cartref, Dryd o Ddail and Awel Gref. In the early seventies, she was invited to act in productions by the Welsh Theatre Company, and also acted in theatres throughout Wales. She performed in productions of Byd a Betws and Gwyliwr. She received recognition for her parts in Dwy Briodas Ann in 1973 and Merch Gwern Hywel in 1976, both works by Saunders Lewis.

Jones' first TV part was in a programme on the Welsh novelist Daniel Owen. Seven years later, she played the same part in a production by the Welsh Theatre Company.

After her 70th birthday, Jones became a more prominent face on Welsh television. She played Miss Brooks in Joni Jones and Ann Robaits in Hufen a Moch Bach (Cream and Pigs). She was a cast member on two series on S4C, Minafon and Gwely a Brecwast. In 1983, she played Lady Grey in the TV movie Owain Glyndwr, which was also shown on S4C. In 1984, she starred in the English series The District Nurse. She was described as a 'one take actress' by John Hefin Evans, and Nerys Hughes praised her for her never forgetting her lines and for her professionalism.

== Filmography ==
Year	Title	Role	Notes
1978	Hawkmoor	Cati	TV series
1978	Fallen Hero	Auntie Beth	TV series
1981	The Life and Times of David Lloyd George	Sara	TV series
1982	Joni Jones	Miss Brooks	TV miniseries
1983–1988	Hufen a Moch Bach	Ann Robaits, Heidden Sur	TV series
1983	Owain Glyndwr, Prince of Wales	Lady Grey	TV movie
1984	The District Nurse	Sarah Hopkins	TV series
1985–1989	Minafon	Hannah Haleliwia	TV series
2011	Welsh Greats	Herself	TV documentary series

== Later life ==
Jones continued acting in later life, which was one of the busiest times in her life. She filmed different TV series, held classes for Welsh learners, gave talks, wrote for local newspapers and magazines, and was a judge for the eisteddfodau. Along with her husband, she founded a club for pensioners in the Old School, and belonged to other groups such as the Bro Dyfnan choir and the Merched y Wawr.

Her contributions through her life did not go unrecognised. In 1979 at the Caernarfon National Eisteddfod she became a member of the Gorsedd and was honoured by receiving a white robe. In 1983, when the Eisteddfod was held in Anglesey, she was awarded the Garmon prize and was recognised as the Best Actress of the Year. She was also awarded the Gee Medal due to her unwavering loyalty to the Sunday School and her religion.

Jones died on 15 April 1999 at the age of 90. She is buried in Llaneugrad church.
