= Ann Veronica =

1909 New Woman novel by H. G. Wells

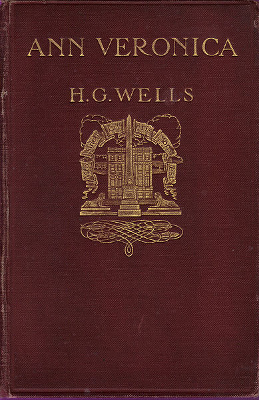
- First Edition Cover
- Author: H. G. Wells
- Language: English
- Genre: Novel, New Woman
- Publisher: T. Fisher Unwin
- Publication date: 1909
- Publication place: United Kingdom
- Media type: Print (hardcover)
- Text: Ann Veronica at Wikisource

Ann Veronica is a New Woman novel by H. G. Wells published in 1909. It describes the rebellion of Ann Veronica Stanley, a 21-year-old woman , against her middle-class father's stern patriarchal rule. The novel dramatizes the contemporary problem of the New Woman. It is set in Edwardian era-London and environs, except for an Alpine excursion. Ann Veronica offers vignettes of the women's suffrage movement in Great Britain and features a chapter inspired by the Grille Incident, a 1908 attempt of suffragettes to storm Parliament.

== Synopsis ==
Mr. Stanley forbids his adult daughter, a biology student at Tredgold Women's College and the youngest of his five children, to attend a fancy dress ball in London, causing a crisis. Ann Veronica is planning to attend the dance with friends of a down-at-heel artistic family living nearby and has been chafing at other restrictions imposed on her for no apparent reason. After her father resorts to force to stop her from attending the ball, she leaves her home in the fictional south London suburb of Morningside Park in order to live independently in an apartment "in a street near the Hampstead Road" in North London. Unable to find appropriate employment, she borrows forty pounds from Mr. Ramage, an older man, without realizing she is compromising herself.

With this money, Ann Veronica is able to devote herself to study in the biological laboratory of the Central Imperial College (a constituent college of London University) where she meets and falls in love with Capes, the laboratory's "demonstrator." But Mr. Ramage loses little time in trying to take advantage of the situation, precipitating a crisis. Distraught after Ramage tries to force himself on her, Ann Veronica temporarily abandons her studies and devotes herself to the cause of women's suffrage; she is arrested storming Parliament and spends a month in prison.

Sobered by the experience, Ann Veronica convinces herself of the necessity of compromise. She returns to her father's home and engages herself to marry an admirer she does not love, Hubert Manning. But she soon changes her mind, renounces the engagement, and boldly tells Capes she loves him.

Though he returns Ann Veronica's love, at first the thirty-year-old Capes insists on the impossibility of the situation: he is a married (albeit separated) man with a sullied reputation because of an affair that became public. They can only be friends, he declares. But Ann Veronica is undeterred by his confession and his prudence, and finally Capes's resistance buckles: "She stood up and held her arms toward him. 'I want you to kiss me,' she said. . . . 'I want you. I want you to be my lover. I want to give myself to you. I want to be whatever I can to you.' She paused for a moment. 'Is that plain?' she asked."

Capes decides to throw over his employment at the college in order to live with Ann Veronica, and they enjoy a glorious "honeymoon" in the Alps. A final chapter shows the happy couple four years and four months later living in London. Capes has become a successful playwright, and Ann Veronica is pregnant and has reconciled with her family.

== Reception ==
H. G. Wells presented this manuscript to his usual publisher Macmillan Publishers who refused to publish it due to its inappropriate nature. Wells was forced to find an alternative publisher for this manuscript which he did in T. Fisher Unwin.

Ann Veronica created a sensation when published in the autumn of 1909 because of the feminist sensibilities of the heroine and also because of the affair Wells was having with Amber Reeves, the woman who inspired the novel's eponymous character.

Although the novel now seems very tame, Ann Veronica was considered a scandalous work by many in its day and was denounced as "capable of poisoning the minds of those who read it" by The Spectator.

Ann Veronica was included in the Modern Library in 1917, the year the publishing company was founded. Subsequent Modern Library editions were published in 1926, 1928, and 1933.

Virginia Quarterly Review published in 1930 a review by Frederick P. Mayer, in which he compared Ann Veronica to Maxim Gorky's novel Bystander, and wrote that ""Ann Veronica" is the type outline, not the individual story, of a young woman rebel... [Wells] preach[es] sermons, and ... debate[s]. But [he] ha[s] no artistic community with the novelist as an artist".

== Adaptations ==
=== Television ===
It was filmed for television in 1952 with Margaret Lockwood in the title role. In 1964 it was adapted again by the BBC as a four-part series Ann Veronica starring Rosemary Nicols.

=== Musical ===
Ann Veronica was made into a musical in 1969; both the musical and one of the numbers within are titled "Ann Veronica".

=== Radio ===
The book was recorded for BBC Radio 4 in two episodes, with Amy Hoggart as Ann Veronica and Geoffrey Whitehead playing Mr Stanley. It was broadcast again on BBC Radio 4 Extra on 5 and 6 January 2021.

== See also ==
- Roman à clef
