= Miniseries =

Television show with few episodes

A miniseries or mini-series, sometimes called a limited-run series, is a television program that tells a story in a predetermined, limited number of episodes (generally 2–12). Many miniseries can also be referred to, and shown, as a television film in several parts.

The term "serial" is used in the United Kingdom and in other Commonwealth nations to describe a show that has an ongoing narrative plotline, while "series" is used for a set of episodes in a similar way that "season" is used in North America.

== Definitions ==
A miniseries is distinguished from an ongoing television series; the latter does not usually have a predetermined number of episodes and may continue for several years. Before the term was coined in the United States in the early 1970s, the ongoing episodic form was always called a "serial", just as a novel appearing in episodes in successive editions of magazines or newspapers is called a serial. In Britain, miniseries are often still referred to as serials or series.

Several commentators have offered more precise definitions of the term. In Halliwell's Television Companion (1987), Leslie Halliwell and Philip Purser suggest that miniseries tend to "appear in four to six episodes of various lengths", while Stuart Cunningham in Textual Innovation in the Australian Historical Mini-series (1989) defined a miniseries as "a limited run program of more than two and less than the 13-part season or half season block associated with serial or series programming". With the proliferation of the format in the 1980s and 1990s, television films broadcast over even two or three nights were commonly referred to as miniseries in the United States.

In Television: A History (1985), Francis Wheen points out a difference in character development between the two: "Both soap operas and primetime series cannot afford to allow their leading characters to develop, since the shows are made with the intention of running indefinitely. In a miniseries on the other hand, there is a clearly defined beginning, middle, and end (as in a conventional play or novel), enabling characters to change, mature, or die as the serial proceeds".

In 2015, the Academy of Television Arts & Sciences changed its guidelines on how Emmy nominees are classified, with shows with a limited run all referred to as "limited series" instead of "miniseries". This was a reversion to 1974, when the category was named "outstanding limited series". It had been changed to "outstanding miniseries" in 1986. Miniseries were put in the same category as made-for-television films from 2011 to 2014, before being given separate categories again.

=== 21st-century definitions ===
The Collins English Dictionary defines a miniseries as "a television programme in several parts that is shown on consecutive days or weeks for a short period; while Webster's New World College Dictionary's (4th ed., 2010, US) definition is "a TV drama or docudrama broadcast serially in a limited number of episodes".

In popular usage, by around 2020, the boundaries between miniseries and limited series have become somewhat blurred; the format has been described as a series with "a self-contained narrative – whether three or 12 episodes long".

== History ==
=== United Kingdom ===
The British television "serial" is rooted in dramatic radio productions developed between the first and second World Wars. In the 1920s, the BBC pioneered dramatic readings of books. In 1925, it broadcast A Christmas Carol, which became a holiday favourite. Later, John Reith, wanting to use radio waves to "part the clouds of ignorance", came up with the idea for Classic Serial, based on a "classical" literary text.

In 1939, the BBC adapted the romantic novel The Prisoner of Zenda for radio broadcast. Its adapter, Jack Inglis, compressed several characters into one and simplified the plotline. The production struck a chord with listeners and served as a prototype for serials that followed it.

Post-war, BBC Television picked up the classic radio serial tradition by broadcasting The Warden by Anthony Trollope over six episodes in 1951. Pride and Prejudice was serialised in 1952, Jane Eyre in 1955. In 1953, the BBC broadcast the first serial written specifically for television: the six-part The Quatermass Experiment. Its success paved the way for two more six-part serials: Quatermass II in 1955 and Quatermass and the Pit in 1958. In November 1960, the BBC televised a 13-episode adaptation of Charles Dickens's Barnaby Rudge. In December of that year, it broadcast a four-episode dramatisation of Jane Austen's Persuasion.

To compete with commercial television, BBC launched BBC2 in 1964. It had a new time slot allocated for classic serial adaptations on Saturday evenings. The late-night broadcast allowed for more risky and sophisticated choices and for longer episodes. In 1967, The Forsyte Saga was broadcast in 26 50-minute episodes. Following its success in Britain, the series was shown in the United States on public television and broadcast all over the world and became the first BBC television series to be sold to the Soviet Union.

=== North America ===
Anthology series dominated American dramatic programming during the Golden Age of Television, when "every night was opening night; one never knew when a flick of the knob would spark the birth of great theatrical literature". A different story and a different set of characters were presented in each episode. Very rarely, the stories were split into several episodes, like the 1955 Mr. Lincoln, from the Omnibus series, which was presented in two parts, or the 1959 adaptation of For Whom the Bell Tolls from the Playhouse 90 series, which was initially planned by the director John Frankenheimer to consist of three parts but was ultimately broadcast in two 90-minute installments. The high price and technical difficulties of staging a new play every week, which would cost as much as—or more than—an episode of a filmed television series, led to the demise of anthology programming by the end of the 1950s. The void was filled with less expensive series like Gunsmoke or Wagon Train, which featured the same characters every week and had higher potential for lucrative rebroadcast and syndication rights. It was the American success in 1969–1970 of the British 26-episode serial The Forsyte Saga that made TV executives realize that finite, multi-episode stories based on novels could be popular and could provide a boost to weekly viewing figures.

According to the Oxford English Dictionary, the earliest known use of the word "miniseries" was in 1963, when it was employed (in hyphenated form) by the Connellsville Daily Courier to describe a limited, five-week run of the CBS music show Your Hit Parade. The Blue Knight, a four-hour, made-for-television movie broadcast in one-hour segments over four nights in November 1973, has elsewhere been credited as the first miniseries on American television. The miniseries form continued in earnest in the spring of 1974, with the Canadian Broadcasting Corporation's eight-part serial The National Dream, based on Pierre Berton's nonfiction book of the same name about the building of the Canadian Pacific Railway, and ABC's two-part QB VII, based on the novel of the same name by Leon Uris. Following these initial forays, broadcasters used miniseries to bring other books to the screen.

Rich Man, Poor Man, based on the eponymous novel by Irwin Shaw, was broadcast in 12 one-hour episodes in 1976 by ABC. It popularized the miniseries format and started a decade-long golden age of television miniseries versions of popular books featuring stars above television class. Alex Haley's Roots in 1977 can fairly be called the first blockbuster success of the format. Its success in the USA was partly due to its schedule: the 12-hour duration was split into eight episodes broadcast on consecutive nights, resulting in a finale with a 71 percent share of the audience and 130 million viewers, which at the time was the highest-rated TV program ever. TV Guide (11–17 April 1987) called 1977's Jesus of Nazareth "the best miniseries of all time" and "unparalleled television". North and South, the 1985 adaptation of a 1982 novel by John Jakes, remains one of the ten highest-rated miniseries in TV history.

=== Japan ===
Japanese serialized television production can be traced back to the Sunday Diary of My Home, which was aired by NTV in 1953 and consisted of 25 half-hour episodes. This "home drama" focused on generational differences and the contradictions of being a loving family in a confined space, outlining a style of drama that lives on to this day. In the same year, NHK tried its own variation of the home drama format in Ups and Downs Toward Happiness, which comprised 13 episodes. Its protagonists, a formerly wealthy family fallen on hard times, is forced to struggle for its own existence. Since then, Japanese television drama, also called dorama (ドラマ), became a staple of Japanese television.

=== South Korea ===
South Korea began to broadcast television series (Korean: 드라마, Hangul transcription of "drama") in the 1960s. Since then, the shows have become popular worldwide, partially due to the spread of the Korean Wave, with streaming services that offer multiple-language subtitles.

Korean dramas are usually helmed by one director and written by one screenwriter, thus having a distinct directing style and language, unlike American television series, where often several directors and writers work together.

=== Soviet Union/Russia ===
While the Soviet Union was among the first European countries to resume television broadcast after the Second World War, early Soviet television did not indulge its viewers with a variety of programming. News, sports, concerts, and movies were the main staples during the 1950s. With state control over television production and broadcast, television was intended not merely for entertainment but also as the means of education and propaganda. Soap operas, quiz shows and games were considered too lowbrow.

In the beginning of the 1960s, television was expanding rapidly. The increase in the number of channels and the duration of daily broadcasts caused a shortage of content deemed suitable for broadcast. This led to the production of television films, in particular multiple-episode television films (Russian: многосерийный телевизионный фильм)—the official Soviet moniker for miniseries.

The 1965 four-episode We Call Fire on Ourselves, a WWII period drama, is considered the first Soviet miniseries. Other popular miniseries of the Soviet era include the 1973 Seventeen Moments of Spring; Days of the Turbins (1976)—an adaptation of the play of the same name by Mikhail Bulgakov, about the fate of intelligentsia during the October Revolution; The Twelve Chairs (1976)—an adaptation of the satirical novel of the same name by Ilf and Petrov; The Meeting Place Cannot Be Changed (1979); Little Tragedies (1979)—a collection of short theatrical plays based on works by Alexander Pushkin; The Suicide Club, or the Adventures of a Titled Person (1981) about the adventures of Prince Florizel, a character from Robert Louis Stevenson's Suicide Club stories; Dead Souls (1984,)—an adaptation of the novel of that name by Nikolai Gogol; and TASS Is Authorized to Declare... (1984).

Numerous miniseries were produced for children in the 1970s–1980s. Among them are The Adventures of Buratino (1976)—an adaptation of The Golden Key, or the Adventures of Buratino by Alexey Tolstoy, which in turn is a retelling of The Adventures of Pinocchio by Carlo Collodi; The Adventures of the Elektronic (1979); and Guest from the Future (1985).

After the dissolution of the Soviet Union in 1991, Russian television experienced a period of privatization and liberalization. Starting from the 2000s, a resurgence of book adaptations took place, such as The Idiot (2003)—an adaptation of the novel by Fyodor Dostoyevsky, and The Master and Margarita (2005)—an adaptation of the novel by Mikhail Bulgakov.

=== Brazil ===
In Brazil, the Rede Globo television network commenced the production of miniseries with the transmission of Lampião e Maria Bonita, written by Aguinaldo Silva and Doc Comparato and directed by Paulo Afonso Grisolli, and broadcast in 1982 in eight episodes.

=== Australia ===
The first locally produced miniseries in Australia was Against the Wind, which aired in 1978. Over one hundred miniseries were produced in Australia over the next decade. Historical dramas were particularly popular with Australian audiences during this period. Between 1984 and 1987, 27 out of a total of 34 Australian-made miniseries had historical themes. Some notable examples included The Dismissal, Bodyline, Eureka Stockade, The Cowra Breakout, Vietnam, and Brides of Christ. The narratives of these miniseries often followed one or two fictionalized individuals in the context of actual historical events and situations. Literary adaptations were also popular, with notable examples including A Town Like Alice, A Fortunate Life, The Harp in the South, and Come in Spinner.

The 1983 miniseries Return to Eden was Australia's most successful to date, with over 300 million viewers around the world. It has been described as "the best Australian example of the melodramatic miniseries".

The number of Australian-made miniseries declined in the 1990s, and many of those that were produced had more of an "international" focus, often starring American or British actors in leading roles and/or being filmed outside of Australia. Some notable examples included The Last Frontier, Which Way Home, A Dangerous Life, Bangkok Hilton, and Dadah Is Death.

=== Egypt ===
In Egypt, the 1980s and 1990s was the golden age of television miniseries, attracting millions of viewers. For example, The Family of Mr Shalash, starring Salah Zulfikar, was the highest-rated at the time.

== Popularity ==
The 1983 American eighteen-hour miniseries The Winds of War was a ratings success, with 140 million viewers for all or part of the show, making it the most-watched miniseries up to that time. Its 1988 sequel, War and Remembrance, won several Emmys and Golden Globes and was considered by some critics the ultimate epic miniseries on American television. However, it also signalled the start of the format's decline, as the $105 million production was a major ratings flop; the advent of VCR and cable television options was responsible for the decrease of length and ratings of most miniseries that continued into the mid-1990s. By 1996, the highest-rated miniseries of the winter season garnered a rating of 19, less than the average of 22 for that same season's top-rated regular series.

In the 21st century, the format made a comeback on cable television and became popular on streaming services. History, for example, has had some of its greatest successes with miniseries such as America: The Story of Us, Hatfields & McCoys, and The Bible. Political Animals by USA Network was honored with a Critics' Choice Television Award for Most Exciting New Series, while HBO's Big Little Lies (which was eventually renewed for a second season) won eight Emmy awards.

To designate one-season shows that are not intended for being renewal, the broadcast and television industries came up with terms like "limited series" or "event series". These terms also apply to multi-season anthology series, such as American Horror Story, Fargo, and True Detective. This makes the self-contained season longer than a miniseries but shorter than the entire run of the multi-season series. This terminology became relevant for the purpose of categorization of programs for industry awards.

Several television executives interviewed by The Hollywood Reporter stated that the term "miniseries" has negative connotations to the public, having become associated with melodrama-heavy works that were commonly produced under the format, while "limited series" or "event series" demand higher respect. The parody miniseries The Spoils of Babylon lampooned many of the negative stereotypes of miniseries.

In the 21st century, two miniseries have had significant impact on pop culture and are often named the two best shows ever made: Band of Brothers, released in 2001, and Chernobyl, which came out in 2019. When the final episode of Chernobyl aired, it was already the highest-rated show in IMDb history.

The miniseries as a format has become more popular than ever before.

== See also ==
- Metaseries
- Telenovela
