= Ann Veronica (film) =

- Based on: Ann Veronica by H.G. Wells
- Screenplay by: Ronald Gow
- Directed by: Campbell Logan
- Starring: Margaret Lockwood
- Country of origin: England
- Original language: English

Original release
- Release: 1952

Ann Veronica is a 1952 British TV version of the 1909 H. G. Wells novel of the same name.

It stars Margaret Lockwood. Lockwood was going to make a film version of this book in 1950 after Highly Dangerous. The project kept being delayed.

She made it after Trent's Last Case. She wrote "I had already developed a great liking for televised plays and this one was an interesting part."

The production was well received.

In 1964 the novel was adapted into a four-part BBC series Ann Veronica starring Rosemary Nicols.
