= Philip Bond (actor) =

British actor (1934–2017)

- Born: 1 November 1934; Burton-on-Trent, Staffordshire, England
- Died: 17 January 2017 (aged 82); Madeira, Portugal
- Education: Royal Central School of Speech and Drama
- Occupation: Actor
- Years active: 1956–2007
- Spouse: Pat Sandys
- Children: 3, including Samantha Bond

Philip George William Bond (1 November 1934 – 17 January 2017) was a British actor. He was best known for playing Albert Frazer in 24 episodes of the 1970s BBC nautical drama The Onedin Line.

== Life and career ==
Bond was born at 189 Uxbridge Street in Burton-on-Trent, Staffordshire, to Welsh parents Matthew William Bond (1899–1951) and Blodwen (née John; 1900–1981); he had an older brother, Ifor John Bond (1929–1992), and a twin sister, Shirley. Bond's first acting experience was at Burton Boys' Grammar School, where he was a pupil, and in addition attended classes at the School of Speech and Drama in Burton. In 1952 he joined the Central School of Speech and Drama (then based in rooms in the Royal Albert Hall), where contemporaries included Delena Kidd, Heather Sears and Ian Hendry. In 1957, he played Sir John Marraby in the musical Zuleika, based on the novel Zuleika Dobson by Max Beerbohm.

His first television role was in the series ITV Television Playhouse (1958–61). He later appeared in, among others, The Saint (1963), Doctor Who (in the serial "The Daleks"; 1964), The Hound of the Baskervilles (1968), The Avengers (1969), Z-Cars (1969–75), Only Fools and Horses (1985), Casualty (2007), and Midsomer Murders (2007).

Bond's film roles include Count Five and Die (1957), Orders to Kill (1958), Foxhole in Cairo (1960), I Want What I Want (1972), and Fever Pitch (1997). He was interviewed in the 2008 documentary The Cult of The Onedin Line.

He married the television producer Pat Sandys (1926–2000) in 1959. The marriage was later dissolved. With Sandys he is the father of actresses Abigail and Samantha Bond, and the film and TV journalist Matthew Bond. He lived in the village of Abergwynfi in his parents' native Wales.

He died at the age of 82 on 17 January 2017, while on holiday in Madeira.

== Filmography ==
=== Film ===
| Year | Title | Role | Notes |
|---|---|---|---|
| 1957 | Count Five and Die | Piet van Wijt | |
| 1958 | Orders to Kill | Nils | Uncredited |
| 1960 | Hell is a City | Headquarters PC | Uncredited |
| 1960 | Foxhole in Cairo | German Signals Sergeant | |
| 1972 | I Want What I Want | Philip | |
| 1990 | Destroying Angel | Desk Clerk | |
| 1997 | Fever Pitch | Turnstile Operator | |

=== Television ===
| Year | Title | Role | Notes |
|---|---|---|---|
| 1956 1958 1961 | ITV Television Playhouse | Leading Seaman Hillbrook Shefford Geoff Stone unknown | Season 1, episode 33: "Morning Departure" Season 3, episode 46: "Cornelius" Season 6: (2 episodes) |
| 1956 1960 1964 | ITV Play of the Week | Private McClelland Mark Elliott Tom Veryan | Season 2, episode 8: "Yellow Jack" Season 5, episode 36: "The Green Pack" Season 9, episode 53: "A Choice of Coward #3: The Vortex" |
| 1960 | The Voodoo Factor | Dr. Tony Wilson | Season 1: (3 episodes) |
| 1960 | Theatre 70 | unknown | Season 1, episode 10: "The Neighbour" |
| 1961 | Walk a Crooked Mile | Fergus Ryder | Season 1, episode 1 |
| 1961 | Storyboard | Johnny | Season 1, episode 3: "The Middle Men" |
| 1961 | The Terrorists | 2nd Lieutenant Hargreaves | TV movie |
| 1961 | BBC Sunday-Night Play | Phillip Barron Lieutenant Mueller | Season 2, episode 17: "The Intervener" Season 3, episode 12: "The Judge and His Hangman" |
| 1963 | Suspense | Colin Bannerman | Season 2, episode 10: "Project Survival" |
| 1963 | It Happened Like This | Bob Tennant | Season 1, episode 13: "The Black Monk" |
| 1963 | Sergeant Cork | George Melrose | Season 1, episode 9: "The Case of the Sleeping Coachman" |
| 1963 | The Saint | Kenneth Ripwell | Season 2, episode 5: "The Elusive Ellshaw" |
| 1963 | Maupassant | unknown | Season 1, episode 12: "Foolish Wives" |
| 1964 | Ann Veronica | Mr. Capes | 3 episodes |
| 1964 | Doctor Who | Ganatus | 5 episodes; serial: The Daleks |
| 1964 | A Choice of Coward | David Veryan | Season 1, episode 3: "The Vortex" |
| 1964 | The Old Wives' Tale | Gerald Scales | 3 episodes |
| 1964 | The Indian Tales of Rudyard Kipling | Holden | Season 1, episode 21: "Without Benefit of Clergy |
| 1965 | Redcap | Captain Pelly | Season 1, episode 12: "A Place of Refuge" |
| 1965 | The Flying Swan | Conrad Stern | Season 1, episode 2: "Trial Plan" |
| 1965 | 199 Park Lane | Tony Ashman | Season 1, episode 1: "The New Tenant" |
| 1965 | No Hiding Place | Julian Forrester Goldie Padgett | Season 7, episode 12: "Music for Murder" Season 8, episode 7: "Run, Johnny, Run" |
| 1966 | Armchair Theatre | unknown | Season 6, episode 27: "The Long Nightmare" |
| 1967 | Sir Arthur Conan Doyle | Arthur Norton | Season 1, episode 11: "The Black Doctor" |
| 1967 | The Revenue | White | Season 1, episode 8: "Sometimes There's a Bonus" |
| 1967 1968 | Man in a Suitcase | Luis Philip Oliver | Season 1: (2 episodes) |
| 1968 | Theatre 625 | Stephen Stephens Andrei | Season 5: (3 episodes) |
| 1968 | BBC Play of the Month | Gilles de Rais | Season 4, episode 1: "St. Joan" |
| 1968 | Sherlock Holmes | Stapleton | Season 2: (2 episodes) |
| 1968 | The Jazz Age | Rupert | Season 1, episode 5: "Lily Christine" |
| 1968 | The Champions | Officer | Season 1, episode 4: "The Experiment" |
| 1969 | The Avengers | Lieutenant Roy Casper | Season 7, episode 14: "The Interrogators" |
| 1969 | Canterbury Tales | Knight | Season 1, episode 5: "The Wife of Bath's Tale/ The Clerk's Tale |
| 1969– 1970 1975 | The Main Chance | Peter Findon | Season 1: (5 episodes) Season 2: (6 episodes) Season 4, episode 4: "Payment by Result" |
| 1969 1975 | Z-Cars | Hatchett Dag Erikson | Season 6, episode 276: "Two for the Record: Part 2" |
| 1970 | Thirty-Minute Theatre | Peter Blakeman | Season 5, episode 14: "The Chief Whip Sends His Compliments" |
| 1971 | Doomwatch | Inspector Drew | Season 2, episode 10: "The Human Time Bomb" |
| 1971 | Jason King | Jaevert | Season 1, episode 11: "Flamingos Only Fly on Tuesdays" |
| 1971– 1972 | The Onedin Line | Albert Frazer | Season 1: (12 episodes) Season 2: (12 episodes) |
| 1972 | The Man Outside | unknown | Season 1, episode 11: "Doubts Are Traitors" |
| 1974 | Justice | Dr. Daniel Richards | Season 3, episode 3: "Duty of Care" |
| 1974 | Dial M for Murder | Simon Page | Season 1, episode 8: "Whatever's Peter Playing At?" |
| 1974 | Marked Personal | Ray Falk | Season 1: (2 episodes) |
| 1974 1976 | Warship | Commander Hilliard Loader | Season 2, episode 2: "Without Just Cause" Season 3, episode 11: "Divert with Despatch" |
| 1975 | Late Call | Timbo Egan | Season 1, episode 4 |
| 1975 | The ITV Play | Major Buxton | Season 1, episode 4: "House in Regent Place: The Barrier" |
| 1977 | Crown Court | Clifford Grant | Season 6, episode 40: "Capers Among the Catacombs: Part 1" |
| 1977 | The Children of the New Forest | Ratcilffe | Season 1: (4 episodes) |
| 1978 | An Englishman's Castle | Inspector | Season 1: (2 episodes) |
| 1979 | Kids | Michael Gibbons | Season 1, episode 13: "David" |
| 1980 | The Sandbaggers | Sir Roderick Hives | Season 3, episode 3: "Unusual Approach" |
| 1980 | Shoestring | Keith | Season 2, episode 9: "Where Was I?" |
| 1981 | Hedda Gabler | Eilert Lovborg | TV movie |
| 1984 | Love and Marriage | Peterson | Season 1, episode 5: "Home Is the Sailor" |
| 1984 | Cold Warrior | Lord Stoneway | Season 1, episode 1: "Bright Sting" |
| 1985 | Travellers by Night | Hugo Schneider | Season 1: (2 episodes) |
| 1985 | Only Fools and Horses | Hendrik Van Kleefe | Season 4, episode 8: "To Hull and Back" |
| 1986 | The Oldest Goose in the Business | Max | TV movie |
| 1987 | Bergerac | Temperley | Season 5, episode 8: "Poison" |
| 1992 | Forever Green | Claud Taylor | Season 2, episode 6 |
| 1993 | Lovejoy | Duncan Strong | Season 4, episode 6: "Second Fiddle" |
| 1994 | Shakespeare: The Animated Tales | Tyrrel Narrator | Season 2: (2 episodes) |
| 1997 | Our Boy | Magistrate | TV movie |
| 2001 | The Life and Adventures of Nicholas Nickleby | Walter Bray | TV movie |
| 2007 | Midsomer Murders | Dr. Wyatt | Season 10, episode 8: "Death in a Chocolate Box" |
| 2008 | The Cult of The Onedin Line | Himself | TV documentary, (final television appearance) |
