= Badger's Bend =

1960s British children's TV series

- Starring: Malcolm Patton; Gay Emma; Kenneth Nash; Hugh Janes
- Country of origin: United Kingdom
- Original language: English
- No. of series: 3
- No. of episodes: 38 (24 missing)

Production
- Running time: 25 minutes
- Production company: Associated-Rediffusion

Original release
- Network: ITV
- Release: 4 January 1963 – 25 February 1964

Badger's Bend is a British children's television series created by Associated-Rediffusion for ITV and aired from 1963 to 1964.

== Overview ==
In series 1, Tim Cordon and his parents have moved to Badger's Bend from London, Tim makes friends with his next door neighbour Betsy Alder, the local veterinarian, Mr Francis and his assistant Sheila Dicken. Tim is given hamsters to look after and soon has an idea to set up an animal hotel in the back garden shed, looking after people's pets when they're away. In series 2, Betsy Alder became the lead after moving to Alemouth to live with her aunt and uncle while her parents are away and meets local boy Oliver Crossley, nicknamed 'Ocky'. In series 3, Betsy returned to Badger's bend and was joined by Dave Banks.

== Cast ==
- Malcolm Patton as Tim Cordon
- Gay Emma as Betsy Alder
- Kenneth Nash as Oliver 'Ocky' Crossley
- Hugh James as Dave Banks
- James Ward as Mr Francis
- Rosemary Nicols as Sheila Dicken
- Pamela Pitchford as Mrs Cordon
- Geoffrey Russell as Mr Cordon
- Jean Alexander as Mrs Alder
- Michael Beint as Mr Alder
- Margaret John as Aunt Madge
- Philip Stone as Uncle Steve
- Geraldine Moffat as Peggy Miller
- George Roubicek as Mr Pym
- Margaret McCourt as Irene Palmer
- Amy Dalby as Mrs Brack

== Episode ==
=== Series 1 ===
No. overall	No. in series	Directed by	Written by	Original release date	Archive Status
1	1	Adrian Brown	John Rhodes & Suzanne Gibbs	4 January 1963	Exists
2	2	Adrian Brown	John Rhodes & Suzanne Gibbs	11 January 1963	Exists
3	3	Adrian Brown	John Rhodes & Suzanne Gibbs	18 January 1963	Missing
4	4	Adrian Brown	John Rhodes & Suzanne Gibbs	25 January 1963	Missing
5	5	Adrian Brown	John Rhodes & Suzanne Gibbs	1 February 1963	Missing
6	6	Adrian Brown	John Rhodes & Suzanne Gibbs	8 February 1963	Missing
7	7	Adrian Brown	John Rhodes & Suzanne Gibbs	15 February 1963	Exists
8	8	Adrian Brown	John Rhodes & Suzanne Gibbs	22 February 1963	Exists
9	9	Adrian Brown	John Rhodes & Suzanne Gibbs	1 March 1963	Missing
10	10	Adrian Brown	John Rhodes & Suzanne Gibbs	8 March 1963	Exists
11	11	Adrian Brown	John Rhodes & Suzanne Gibbs	15 March 1963	Exists
12	12	Adrian Brown	John Rhodes & Suzanne Gibbs	22 March 1963	Missing
13	13	Adrian Brown	John Rhodes & Suzanne Gibbs	29 March 1963	Missing
14	14	Adrian Brown	John Rhodes & Suzanne Gibbs	5 April 1963	Missing
15	15	Eric J. Croall	John Rhodes & Suzanne Gibbs	12 April 1963	Missing
16	16	Eric J. Croall	John Rhodes & Suzanne Gibbs	19 April 1963	Exists
17	17	Eric J. Croall	John Rhodes & Suzanne Gibbs	26 April 1963	Missing

=== Series 2 ===
No. overall	No. in series	Directed by	Written by	Original release date	Archive Status
18	1	Marc Miller	John Rhodes & Jeremy Kingston	1 October 1963	Exists
19	2	Marc Miller	John Rhodes & Jeremy Kingston	8 October 1963	Missing
20	3	Marc Miller	John Rhodes & Jeremy Kingston	15 October 1963	Missing
21	4	Marc Miller	John Rhodes & Jeremy Kingston	22 October 1963	Missing
22	5	Marc Miller	John Rhodes & Jeremy Kingston	29 October 1963	Picture Exists (Sound Missing)
23	6	Marc Miller	John Rhodes & Jeremy Kingston	5 November 1963	Missing
24	7	Marc Miller	John Rhodes & Jeremy Kingston	12 November 1963	Exists
25	8	Marc Miller	John Rhodes & Jeremy Kingston	19 November 1963	Exists
26	9	Marc Miller	John Rhodes & Jeremy Kingston	26 November 1963	Missing
27	10	Bob Gray	John Rhodes & Jeremy Kingston	3 December 1963	Exists
28	11	Marc Miller	John Rhodes & Jeremy Kingston	10 December 1963	Exists
29	12	Marc Miller	John Rhodes & Jeremy Kingston	17 December 1963	Exists

=== Series 3 ===
No. overall	No. in series	Directed by	Written by	Original release date	Archive Status
30	1	Bob Gray	Suzanne Gibbs	31 December 1963	Missing
31	2	Bob Gray	Suzanne Gibbs	7 January 1964	Missing
32	3	Bob Gray	Suzanne Gibbs	14 January 1964	Missing
33	4	Bob Gray	Suzanne Gibbs	21 January 1964	Missing
34	5	Bob Gray	Suzanne Gibbs	28 January 1964	Missing
35	6	Bob Gray	Suzanne Gibbs	4 February 1964	Missing
36	7	Bob Gray	Suzanne Gibbs	11 February 1964	Missing
37	8	Bob Gray	Suzanne Gibbs	18 February 1964	Missing
38	9	Bob Gray	Suzanne Gibbs	25 February 1964	Missing

== Archive status ==
Of the 38 episodes produced, 24 are missing, 13 survive and 1 has surviving picture but no sound.
