= Undermind (TV series) =

1965 British science fiction drama TV series

- Directed by: Bill Bain; Laurence Bourne; Peter Dews; Patrick Dromgoole; Raymond Menmuir; Peter Potter
- Starring: Jeremy Wilkin; Rosemary Nicols; Denis Quilley; John Barron
- Theme music composer: Paul Lewis
- Country of origin: United Kingdom
- Original language: English
- No. of series: 1
- No. of episodes: 11

Production
- Camera setup: Multiple-camera setup
- Running time: 60 minutes 50 minutes (excluding advertisements)
- Production company: ABC Weekend TV

Original release
- Network: ITV
- Release: 1965

Undermind is a science fiction television drama produced by ABC Weekend Television in 1965. It ran for eleven episodes of sixty minutes each. It starred Jeremy Wilkin, Rosemary Nicols and Denis Quilley.

The series was devised by Shoestring and Bergerac creator Robert Banks Stewart, who also went on to write for Doctor Who. Several other writers known for their work on Who also contributed scripts: David Whitaker, Bill Strutton and Robert Holmes.

== Plot ==
Personnel Officer Drew Heriot returns to the United Kingdom after working in Australia to discover his brother, Police Detective Frank Heriot, behaving oddly, to the distress of his sister-in-law Anne. Investigating together, they discover that a disembodied alien force is using high frequency signals to brainwash people – including Drew's brother – into committing subversive acts as a prelude to a full-scale invasion. Together, Drew and Anne battle to stop the acts of sabotage while trying to alert Britain to the danger.

== Recurring cast ==
- Jeremy Wilkin as Drew Heriot (11 episodes (full series))
- Rosemary Nicols as Anne Heriot (11 episodes (full series))
- Denis Quilley as Professor Val Randolph (4 episodes: "Flowers of Havoc", "The New Dimension", "Death in England" and "Too Many Enemies")
- John Barron as Sir Godfrey Tillinger (2 episodes: "Waves of Sound" and "End Signal")
- David Phetheam as Caper (2 episodes: "Waves of Sound" and "End Signal")

== Broadcasts ==
The series was not networked. ABC debuted the series on its Midlands and North franchise on Saturday May 8, 1965. The eleven episodes ran through to July 17. One week later ATV London began screenings. Strangely, ATV played episode 9 out of order, as the 4th episode in its sequence and only showed 10 episodes in all, declining to show "Song of Death".

== Episodes ==
	Episode Title	Episode Plot
1	"Instance One" aka "Onset of Fear"	Police Detective Frank Herriot has attacked a member of Parliament and otherwise behaves strangely. His brother Drew and estranged wife Anne try to understand with the help of a psychiatrist, but he - the psychiatrist - is soon murdered.
2	"Flowers of Havoc"	Drew, Anne and Val search for answers to why a mysterious brass rubbing of a medieval knight was mailed from a small seaside town. They find the place overrun with bikers and young thugs, and the local vicar strangely complacent.
3	"The New Dimension"	Drew is inexplicably on a client list of a murdered call girl, and is put through some high-pressure questioning, and is identified by a girl he's never seen. Anne goes under cover at a shady employment agency.
4	"Death in England"	An old IRA fighter is invited to London to dedicate a statue of a deceased British Army foe. The unlikely request is answered positively, to the shock of his elderly comrades in arms, who bitterly oppose his willing involvement.
5	"Too Many Enemies"	Attempting to foil a plot to steal the 'black boxes' - containing signals from space, possibly from aliens - from the Kimberley Vale radio-telescope observatory, Drew and Anne are horrified to find out who is actually behind the affair.
6	"Intent to Destroy"	In a run down hotel, a stockbroker receives tips from a man who claims he can foretell the future, including the death of "someone famous" in front of many people. Herriot tries to stop it, and nearly dies himself.
7	"Song of Death"	What's the connection between the alarmingly numerous suicides of doctors and musical birthday jingles they all received? And who is masterminding the operation?
8	"Puppets of Evil"	The Underminds gain control over a popular children's story writer, and slowly, her cartoon and puppet creation,"Zoomer", is joined by a monstrous fish-like character, "Mulagatawny" that tells terrible stories that upset children's innocence and beliefs, such as where Father Christmas tries to kill them. The whole thing explodes when against her will, she devises a puppet performance where Zoomer himself is murdered, leaving her career ruined and her reputation disgraced.
9	"Test for the Future"	A push, a scream, a job to be filled. Two men rehearsing - rehearsing a plan with serious consequences for the country's future.
10	"Waves of Sound"	The Underminds have recruited a has-been radio comedian and the staff of cold research hydro to plan a mass hypnosis scheme to spread a deadly disease.
11	"End Signal"	The true and frightening scale of the Undermind plot is revealed. Can communications minister Tillinger's jamming station stop the second signal from completing their plans?

== Release ==
The series survived completely as black and white film telerecordings of the original 405 line master videotapes and was released as such on DVD by Network on 23 July 2012.
