= Traeth Bychan =

Beach on Anglesey, Wales

Coordinates: 53.33241°N 4.25368°W

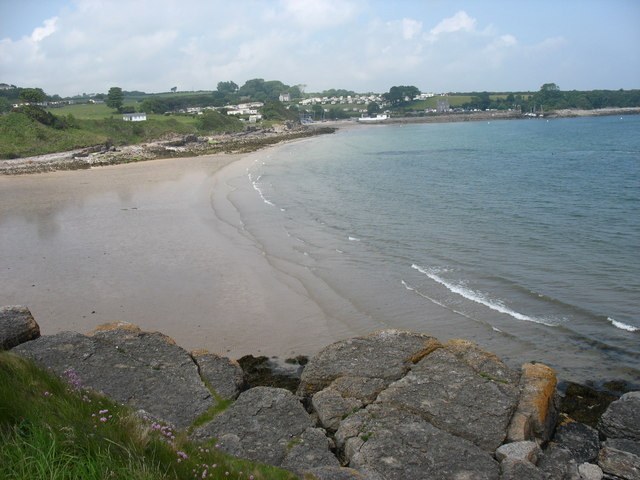

- Location within Anglesey
- OS grid reference: SH 51587 84710
- Principal area: Anglesey
- Country: Wales
- Sovereign state: United Kingdom
- Post town: Marianglas
- Dialling code: 01248
- Police: North Wales
- Fire: North Wales
- Ambulance: Welsh

Traeth Bychan (Traeth = 'beach', Bychan = 'small') is a beach on the isle of Anglesey, Wales.

The beach is between the villages of Benllech and Moelfre. It faces eastwards and so offers shelter from the prevailing southwesterly winds. It is popular with walkers on the Anglesey Coastal Path and is used by members of the Red Wharf Bay Sailing and Watersports Club.

This beach is famous as the spot where the submarine HMS Thetis was beached after a tragic accident which occurred off the coast, when the vessel was carrying out trials in 1939.

There is a cafe and public toilets within the pay & display car park. Nearby, is the small town of Benllech and the village of Marian-Glas.
