= Llaneugrad =

Community in Anglesey, Wales

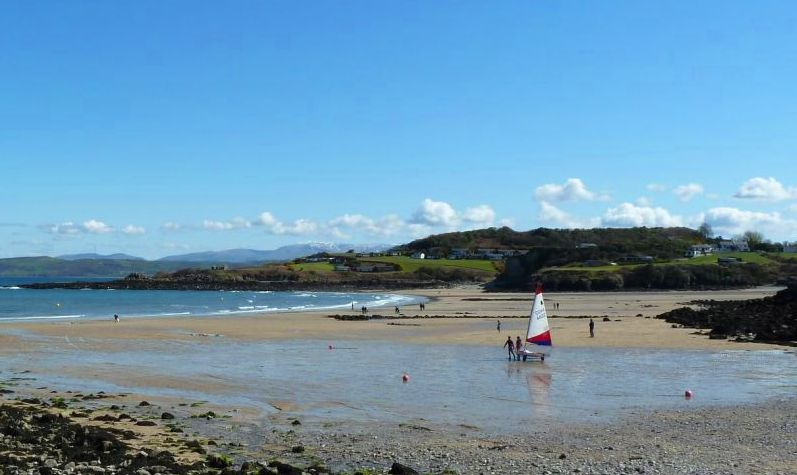
- Traeth Bychan

- Location within Anglesey
- Population: 254 (2011)
- OS grid reference: SH4984
- Community: Llaneugrad
- Principal area: Anglesey
- Preserved county: Gwynedd
- Country: Wales
- Sovereign state: United Kingdom
- Post town: MARIAN-GLAS
- Postcode district: LL73
- Dialling code: 01248
- Police: North Wales
- Fire: North Wales
- Ambulance: Welsh
- UK Parliament: Ynys Môn
- Senedd Cymru – Welsh Parliament: Bangor Conwy Môn
- List of places UK Wales Anglesey 53.336°N 4.262°W Map of the community

Llaneugrad is a community in Anglesey, Wales. It is located on the east coast of the island, 7.2 miles (11.6 km) south east of Amlwch, 9.8 miles (15.8 km) north west of Menai Bridge and 6.7 miles (10.8 km) north east of Llangefni, and includes the village of Marian-glas. At the 2001 census the community had a population of 273.

Saint Eugrad's Church stands in an isolated position at Parciau, some 450m south of the Parciau hill fort. The nave and chancel date from the 12th century, there is a 13th-century carved crucifixion stone, and doorways dating from the 14th and 15th centuries. It was restored in the late 19th century. A stone memorial commemorates John Groome, the fourth officer of the Royal Charter, which was driven onto rocks at Moelfre, with over 450 lives lost, in 1859. It is considered by Cadw to be a simple rural church characteristic of the island, and is Grade II* listed. Nearby in Parciau Park, stands a similarly listed early 17th century dovecote.

The community reaches the coast at Traeth Bychan, a sandy bay backed by cliffs. The bay has been the home of Red Wharf Bay Sailing and Water Sports Club since 1956, and is a venue for dinghy and catamaran sailing. An annual race from Beaumaris, which terminates in the bay, is held each August. In 1939, the Thetis, a Royal Navy submarine built in Birkenhead, sank during sea trials, with the loss of 99 lives. On recovery, the submarine was beached at Traeth Bychan, before being towed to Holyhead, where the bodies were recovered and buried in a mass grave.
