= Campbell Logan =

British television producer and director

- Born: 24 April 1910; Lanarkshire, Scotland, United Kingdom
- Died: 28 November 1978 (aged 68); Spain
- Occupations: Producer, director
- Years active: 1937-1970 (TV)

Campbell Logan (1910–1978) was a British television producer and director. He produced a large number of serials for the BBC, often based on classic works of literature.

== Selected filmography ==
- BBC Sunday-Night Theatre (1950–1959)
- The Warden (1951)
- Ann Veronica (1952)
- Jane Eyre (1956)
- Vanity Fair (1956)
- Precious Bane (1957)
- The Royalty (1957–1958)
- Charlesworth (1959)
- The Naked Lady (1959)
- Emma (1960)
- Persuasion (1960)
- The Men from Room 13 (1961)
- Dr. Finlay's Casebook (1962–1964)
- Kidnapped (1963)
- The Count of Monte Cristo (1964)
- Martin Chuzzlewit (1964)
- Smuggler's Bay (1964)
- Rupert of Hentzau (1964)
- Alexander Graham Bell (1965)
- Poison Island (1965)
- Heiress of Garth (1965)
- Hereward the Wake (1965)
- Silas Marner (1965)
- A Tale of Two Cities (1965)
- David Copperfield (1966)
- The Queen's Traitor (1967)
- Pride and Prejudice (1967)
- Les Misérables (1967)
- St. Ives (1967)
- Great Expectations (1967)
- Treasure Island (1968)
- The Railway Children (1968)
- The £1,000,000 Bank Note (1968)
- The Man in the Iron Mask (1968)
- Nicholas Nickleby (1968)
- Dombey and Son (1969)
- The Elusive Pimpernel (1969)
- Ivanhoe (1970)

== Bibliography ==
- Mary Hammond. Charles Dickens's Great Expectations: A Cultural Life, 1860–2012. Routledge, 2016.
- Andrew J. MacDonald & Gina MacDonald. Jane Austen on Screen. Cambridge University Press, 2003.
