= Hugh Griffith =

Welsh actor (1912–1980)

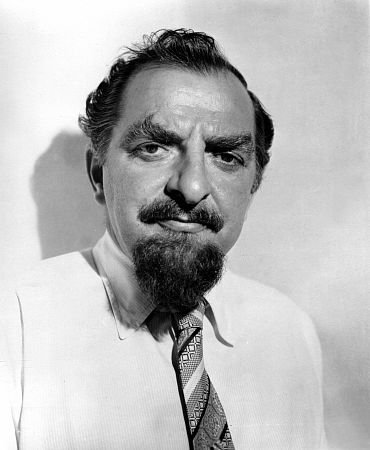
- Griffith in 1960
- Born: Hugh Emrys Griffith; 30 May 1912; Marian-glas, Anglesey, Wales
- Died: 14 May 1980 (aged 67); London, England
- Resting place: Golders Green Crematorium, London, England
- Education: Llangefni County School; Royal Academy of Dramatic Arts
- Occupation: Actor
- Years active: 1939–1980
- Spouse: Adelgunde Margaret Beatrice von Dechend (m. 1947)
- Relatives: Elen Roger Jones (sister)
- Awards: See below
- Military career
- Allegiance: United Kingdom
- Branch: British Army
- Service years: 1940–1946
- Unit: Royal Welch Fusiliers
- Conflicts: World War II; Burma Campaign

Hugh Emrys Griffith (30 May 1912 – 14 May 1980) was a Welsh actor. Described by BFI's Screenonline as a "wild-eyed, formidable character player", Griffith appeared in more than 100 theatre, film, and television productions in a career that spanned over 40 years. He was the second Welsh-born actor to win an Academy Award (following Ray Milland for The Lost Weekend), winning a Best Supporting Actor Oscar for his role in Ben-Hur (1959), with a second nomination for Tom Jones (1963).

As a stage actor, he was a renowned Shakespearean and a member of the Royal Shakespeare Company, and was nominated for Tony Award for Best Actor in a Play for the original production Look Homeward, Angel. He was also a BAFTA Award and a three-time Golden Globe nominee for Best Supporting Actor – Motion Picture (for Tom Jones; 1963, Oliver!; 1968, and The Fixer, also 1968), and a Clarence Derwent Award winner.

== Early life ==
Griffith was born in Marian-glas, Anglesey, Wales, the youngest son of Mary and William Griffith. His sister was actress Elen Roger Jones. He was educated at Llangefni County School and attempted to gain entrance to university, but failed the English examination. He was then urged to make a career in banking, becoming a bank clerk and transferring to London to be closer to acting opportunities.

Just as he was making progress and gained admission to the Royal Academy of Dramatic Arts, he had to suspend his plans in order to join the British Army, serving for six years with the Royal Welch Fusiliers in India and the Burma Campaign during the Second World War. He resumed his acting career in 1946, joining the Royal Shakespeare Company.

== Career ==
=== Stage ===
Between 1946 and 1976, Griffith won acclaim for many stage roles, in particular for his portrayals of Falstaff, Lear and Prospero. Griffith performed on both sides of the Atlantic, taking leading roles in London, New York City and Stratford. In 1952, he starred in the Broadway adaptation of Legend of Lovers, alongside fellow Welsh actor Richard Burton.

In 1958, he was back in New York, this time taking a lead role in the opening production of Look Homeward, Angel, alongside Anthony Perkins. Both he and Perkins were nominated for the Tony Award for Best Actor in a Play.

=== Film ===
Griffith began his film career in British films during the late 1940s, and by the 1950s was also working in Hollywood. He won the Academy Award for Best Supporting Actor for his role in Ben-Hur (1959), and was nominated for his performance in Tom Jones (1963). In 1968, he appeared as the magistrate in Oliver!. His later career was often blighted by his chronic alcoholism.

He played the funeral director Caradog Lloyd-Evans in the 1978 BBC Wales comedy Grand Slam. While visibly unwell at the time of shooting (years of alcohol abuse had taken their toll), Griffith's portrayal received widespread acclaim and helped the movie attain cult status.

Griffith was attached to Orson Welles's unproduced 1960s adaptation of Treasure Island.

=== Television ===
On television, he had major roles in Quatermass II (1955), a miniseries adaptation of A. J. Cronin's The Citadel (1960) and Clochemerle (1972). He also appeared in an episode, 'The Talking Head', of Colonel March of Scotland Yard.

== Honours ==
He received an honorary degree from the University of Wales, Bangor, in 1965.

== Personal life ==
Griffith was married to Adelgunde Margaret Beatrice von Dechend in 1947. He was a lifelong friend and drinking companion of poet Dylan Thomas.

=== Death ===
Griffith, after being unwell for about a year, died in 1980 at his home in Kensington, London, at age 67.

== Filmography ==
=== Film ===
Year	Title	Role	Director	Notes
1940	Night Train to Munich	Sailor	Carol Reed	Uncredited
1940	Neutral Port	Spaniard	Marcel Varnel	Uncredited
1947	The Silver Darlings	Packman	Clarence Elder	
1948	The Three Weird Sisters	Mabli Hughes	Daniel Birt	
1948	So Evil My Love	Coroner	Lewis Allen	
1948	The First Gentleman	Bishop of Salisbury	Alberto Cavalcanti	
1948	London Belongs to Me	Headlam Fynne	Sidney Gilliat	
1949	The Last Days of Dolwyn	The Minister	Emlyn Williams	
1949	Kind Hearts and Coronets	Lord High Steward	Robert Hamer	
1949	Doctor Morelle	Bensall	Godfrey Grayson	
1949	A Run for Your Money	Huw Price	Charles Frend	
1950	Gone to Earth	Andrew Vessons	Powell and Pressburger	
1951	The Galloping Major	Harold Temple	Henry Cornelius	
1951	Laughter in Paradise	Henry Augustus Russell	Mario Zampi	
1953	The Titfield Thunderbolt	Dan Taylor	Charles Crichton	
1953	The Beggar's Opera	The Beggar	Peter Brook	
1954	The Million Pound Note	Potter	Ronald Neame	Uncredited
1954	The Sleeping Tiger	The Inspector	Joseph Losey	
1955	Passage Home	Pettigrew	Roy Ward Baker	
1957	The Good Companions	Morton Mitcham	J. Lee Thompson	
1957	Lucky Jim	Professor Welch	John Boulting	
1959	Ben-Hur	Sheik Ilderim	William Wyler	
1959	The Story on Page One	Judge Edgar Neilsen	Clifford Odets	
1960	The Day They Robbed the Bank of England	O'Shea	John Guillermin	
1960	Exodus	Mandria	Otto Preminger	
1962	The Counterfeit Traitor	Collins	George Seaton	
1962	The Inspector	Van der Pink	Philip Dunne	
1962	Term of Trial	O'Hara	Peter Glenville	
1962	Mutiny on the Bounty	Alexander Smith	Lewis Milestone	
1963	Tom Jones	Squire Western	Tony Richardson	Academy Award for Best Supporting Actor
1964	Hide and Seek	Wilkins	Cy Endfield	
1964	The Bargee	Joe Turnbull	Duncan Wood	
1965	The Amorous Adventures of Moll Flanders	Prison Governor	Terence Young	
1966	How to Steal a Million	Bonnet	William Wyler	
1967	Oh Dad, Poor Dad, Mamma's Hung You in the Closet and I'm Feelin' So Sad	Commodore Roseabove	Richard Quine	
1967	The Sailor from Gibraltar	Llewellyn	Tony Richardson	
1967	On My Way to the Crusades, I Met a Girl Who...	Ibn-el-Rascid	Pasquale Festa Campanile	
1967	Brown Eye, Evil Eye	Tadeusz Bridges	Robert Angus	
1968	Oliver!	The Magistrate	Carol Reed	
1968	Il marito è mio e l'ammazzo quando mi pare	Ignazio	Pasquale Festa Campanile	
1968	The Fixer	Lebedev	John Frankenheimer	
1970	Start the Revolution Without Me	King Louis XVI	Bud Yorkin	
1970	Cry of the Banshee	Mickey	Gordon Hessler	
1970	Wuthering Heights	Dr. Kenneth	Robert Fuest	
1971	Whoever Slew Auntie Roo?	"The Pigman" Harrison	Curtis Harrington	
1971	The Abominable Dr. Phibes	Rabbi	Robert Fuest	
1972	Dr. Phibes Rises Again	Harry Ambrose	Robert Fuest	
1972	The Canterbury Tales	Sir January	Pier Paolo Pasolini	
1972	What?	Joseph Noblart	Roman Polanski	
1973	Crescete e moltiplicatevi	Monsignor Casadei	Giulio Petroni	
1973	The Final Programme	Professor Hira	Robert Fuest	
1973	Take Me High	Sir Harry Cunningham	David Askey	
1974	Luther	John Tetzel	Guy Green	
1974	The Visitor	Barone di Roccadura	Sergio Martino	
1974	Craze	Solicitor	Freddie Francis	
1975	Legend of the Werewolf	Maestro Pamponi	Freddie Francis	
1976	The Passover Plot	Caiaphas	Michael Campus	
1977	Casanova & Co.	The Caliph	Franz Antel	
1977	Joseph Andrews	Squire Western	Tony Richardson	
1977	The Last Remake of Beau Geste	Judge	Marty Feldman	
1978	The Hound of the Baskervilles	Frankland	Paul Morrissey	
1979	A Nightingale Sang in Berkeley Square	Sid Larkin	Ralph Thomas	

=== Television ===
Year	Title	Role	Notes
1952	Goodyear Television Playhouse		Episode: "Tour of Duty"
1952	Lux Video Theatre	Constantine / Man with Cello	Episodes: "The Game of Chess" & "The Sounds of Waves Breaking"
1952	Lights Out		Episode: "The Borgia Lamp"
1953	Saturday Special		4 episodes
1953	Rheingold Theatre		Episode: "Outpost"
1955	Sunday Night Theatre	Photographer	Episode: "The Moment of Truth"
1955	Colonel March of Scotland Yard	Dr. Ivy	Episode: "The Talking Head"
1957	Armchair Theatre	Simon Kendall	Episode: "Now Let Him Go"
1959	Omnibus		Episode: "Ah Sweet Mystery of Mrs. Murphy"
1959	ITV Play of the Week	M. Tarde / Gen. Léon Saint-Pé	Episode: "The Wild Bird" & "The Waltz of the Toreadors"
1959	Playhouse 90	Jaggers / Reverend Light	Episode: "The Second Man" & "The Grey Nurse Said Nothing"
1960	The DuPont Show of the Week	Long John Silver	Episode: "Treasure Island"
1963	Comedy Playhouse	Luther Flannery	Episode: "The Walrus and the Carpenter"
1967	ABC Stage 67	Herr Hoffman	Episode: "Dare I Weep, Dare I Mourn?"
1971	Tomorrow's World	The Baron	Episode: "Tomorrow's World Meets Yesterday's World"
1971-72	Thirty-Minute Theatre	Choobukov / Uncle Rollo	Episodes: "The Proposal" & "Uncle Rollo"
1973	Owen, M.D.	John Owen	Episode: "September Song!"
1973	Orson Welles Great Mysteries	The Man	Episode: "The Inspiration of Mr. Budd"
1974	BBC2 Playhouse	Dr. Walden	Episode: "The Joke"

==== TV films, miniseries, and specials ====
Year	Title	Role
1939	Johnson Was No Gentleman	Footman
1947	The Wandering Jew	Juan de Texeda
1947	Maria Marten or, the Murder at the Red Barn	Ishmael
1947	The Tragical History of Doctor Faustus	Mephistophilis
1948	A Comedy of Good and Evil	The Rev. John Williams
1952	Back to Methuselah	
1953	Escapade	Andrew Deeson
1953	The Broken Jug	Judge Adam
1953	The Teddy Bear	Charley Delaney
1955	The Merry Christmas	Scrooge
1955	Quatermass II	Dr. Leo Pugh
1960	The Citadel	Philip Denny
1960	Point of Departure	Father
1966	The Poppy Is Also a Flower	Salah Rahman Khan
1972	Clochemerle	Alexandre Bourdillat
1975	A Legacy	Baron Felden
1978	Grand Slam	Caradog Lloyd-Evans

== Partial theatre credits ==
Year	Title	Role	Director	Venue	Ref.
1940	The Venetian	Concini	Hugh Miller	St Martin's Theatre, London	
1946	The Tempest	Trinculo	Eric Crozier	Royal Shakespeare Theatre, Stratford-upon-Avon	
1946	Love's Labour's Lost	Holofernes	Peter Brook	Royal Shakespeare Theatre, Stratford-upon-Avon	
1946	Henry V	Charles VI	Dorothy Green	Royal Shakespeare Theatre, Stratford-upon-Avon	
1946	As You Like It	Touchstone	Herbert Prentice	Royal Shakespeare Theatre, Stratford-upon-Avon	
1946	Macbeth	First Witch	Michael Macowan	Royal Shakespeare Theatre, Stratford-upon-Avon	
1946	Doctor Faustus	Mephistopheles	Walter Hudd	Royal Shakespeare Theatre, Stratford-upon-Avon	
1947	The White Devil	Cardinal Monticelso	Michael Benthall	Duchess Theatre, London	
1948	A Comedy of Good and Evil	The Rev. John Williams	Vivienne Bennett	Arts Theatre, London	
1950-51	Point of Departure	Father	Peter Ashmore	Lyric Theatre, London	
1950-51	Point of Departure	Father	Peter Ashmore	Duke of York's Theatre, London	
1951	Richard II	John of Gaunt	Anthony Quayle	Royal Shakespeare Theatre, Stratford-upon-Avon	
1951	Henry IV, Part 1	Owen Glendower	Anthony Quayle	Royal Shakespeare Theatre, Stratford-upon-Avon	
1951	The Tempest	Caliban	Michael Benthall	Royal Shakespeare Theatre, Stratford-upon-Avon	
1951-52	Henry V	Canterbury	Anthony Quayle	Royal Shakespeare Theatre, Stratford-upon-Avon	
1951-52	Legend of Lovers	His Father	Peter Ashmore	Plymouth Theatre, New York City	
1952-54	Escapade	Andrew Deeson	John Fernald	Theatre Royal, Brighton	
1952-54	Escapade	Andrew Deeson	John Fernald	St James's Theatre, London	
1952-54	Escapade	Andrew Deeson	John Fernald	Strand Theatre, London	
1954	The Dark Is Light Enough	Belmann	Peter Brook	Aldwych Theatre, London	
1954	The Dark Is Light Enough	Belmann	Peter Brook	The Alexandra, Birmingham	
1956-57	The Waltz of the Toreadors	Gen. Léon Saint-Pé	Peter Hall	Arts Theatre, London	
1956-57	The Waltz of the Toreadors	Gen. Léon Saint-Pé	Peter Hall	Criterion Theatre, London	
1956-57	The Waltz of the Toreadors	Gen. Léon Saint-Pé	Peter Hall	Royal Lyceum Theatre, Edinburgh	
1957-59	Look Homeward, Angel	W.O. Gant	George Roy Hill	Ethel Barrymore Theatre, New York City	
1959	The Cenci	Francesco Cenci	Michael Benthall	The Old Vic, London	
1962	The Caucasian Chalk Circle	Azdak	William Gaskill	Aldwych Theatre, London	
1963	Andorra	The Teacher	Michael Langham	Biltmore Theater, New York City	
1964	Henry IV, Part 1	John Falstaff	Peter Hall	Royal Shakespeare Theatre, Stratford-upon-Avon	
1964	Henry IV, Part 2	John Falstaff	Peter Hall	Royal Shakespeare Theatre, Stratford-upon-Avon	

== Awards and nominations ==
Award	Year	Category	Work	Result	Ref.
Academy Award	1960	Best Supporting Actor	Ben-Hur	Won	
Academy Award	1964	Best Supporting Actor	Tom Jones	Nominated	
British Academy Film Award	1964	Best British Actor	Tom Jones	Nominated	
Clarence Derwent Award	1952	Best Supporting Male (UK)	Legend of Lovers	Won	
Golden Globe Award	1964	Best Supporting Actor – Motion Picture	Tom Jones	Nominated	
Golden Globe Award	1969	Best Supporting Actor – Motion Picture	Oliver!	Nominated	
Golden Globe Award	1969	Best Supporting Actor – Motion Picture	The Fixer	Nominated	
Laurel Award	1960	Top Supporting Male Performance	Ben-Hur	Nominated	
Laurel Award	1964	Top Supporting Male Performance	Tom Jones	5th place	
National Board of Review	1959	Best Supporting Actor	Ben-Hur	Won	
Tony Award	1958	Best Actor in a Play	Look Homeward, Angel	Nominated	
