= Nicholas Nickleby (1968 TV series) =

- Radio Times cover with Martin Jarvis
- Genre: Historical drama
- Based on: Nicholas Nickleby by Charles Dickens
- Written by: Hugh Leonard
- Directed by: Joan Craft
- Starring: Martin Jarvis
- Country of origin: United Kingdom
- Original language: English
- No. of series: 1
- No. of episodes: 13

Production
- Producer: Campbell Logan
- Running time: 25 minutes
- Production company: BBC

Original release
- Network: BBC 1
- Release: 11 February – 5 May 1968

Nicholas Nickleby is a British thirteen-part television series that first aired on BBC 1 in 1968. It is based on the novel Nicholas Nickleby by Charles Dickens, following a compassionate young man who, after the death of his father, tries to save his friends and family from his wicked uncle, and earn a living strong enough to support them.

== Cast ==
- Martin Jarvis as Nicholas Nickleby (13 episodes)
- Susan Brodrick as Kate Nickleby (12 episodes)
- Hugh Walters as Smike (12 episodes)
- Derek Francis as Ralph Nickleby (11 episodes)
- Gordon Gostelow as Newman Noggs (11 episodes)
- Thea Holme as Mrs Catherine Nickleby (11 episodes)
- Ronald Radd as Wackford Squeers (7 episodes)
- Maxwell Shaw as Mr Mantalini (7 episodes)
- Thelma Ruby as Madame Mantalini (6 episodes)
- Terence Alexander as Sir Mulberry Hawk (5 episodes)
- Raymond Clarke as Lord Frederick Verisopht (5 episodes)
- Hazel Coppen as Miss La Creevy (5 episodes)
- Sharon Gurney as Madeline Bray (5 episodes)
- John Bailey as Brooker (4 episodes)
- Geoffrey Bayldon as Arthur Gride (4 episodes)
- Malcolm Epstein as Wackford Junior (4 episodes)
- John Gill as Ned Cheeryble (4 episodes)
- Bartlett Mullins as Tim Linkinwater (4 episodes)
- Paul Shelley as Frank Cheeryble (4 episodes)
- Rosalind Knight as Miss Snevellicci (2 episodes)
- Daphne Heard as Peg Silderskew (2 episodes)

== Archive status ==
The original black and white master videotapes for the serial were wiped sometime after broadcast, although all episodes survived as 16mm telerecordings. The full serial is unavailable online and was not included on DVD by Simply Media when the company released other surviving Dickens serials produced by the BBC between 1958 and 1969 (such as versions of Bleak House and Great Expectations). As of 2024, it remains unreleased in any format.

== See also ==
- Nicholas Nickleby (1957 TV series) – 10-part BBC serial

== Bibliography ==
- Michael Pointer. Charles Dickens on the Screen: The Film, Television, and Video Adaptations. Scarecrow Press, 1996.
