= Don Safran =

American film and television screenwriter, producer and marketing executive

Donald Bernard Safran (January 17, 1930 – February 17, 2014) was an American film and television screenwriter, producer and marketing executive. He was also a reporter, film critic and arts and entertainment editor for the Dallas Times Herald, as well as a reporter for The Hollywood Reporter.

== Early years and journalism ==
Born in Bensonhurst, Brooklyn, New York, he graduated from Lafayette High School. He served two years in the United States Marine Corps before studying journalism at Mexico City College and Arizona State University. He joined the Times Herald in 1956 as a movie critic, as well as covering nightclubs in Dallas. The latter ultimately led to him speaking with Jack Ruby via telephone. Their conversations were cited in the Warren Report, following John F. Kennedy's assassination in 1963 and Ruby's shooting of Lee Harvey Oswald.

Safran also hosted a radio program, Night Scene on KRLD, during which he interviewed celebrities, and was one of the founders of the USA Film Festival. In the 1970s, his passion for films and writing led him to Los Angeles, where he reported for The Hollywood Reporter and the Los Angeles magazine.

== Film and television executive ==
Safran served as vice president of publicity for Columbia Pictures and then as executive vice president of marketing for Rastar Productions, promoting such films as Biloxi Blues, Blue Thunder, Peggy Sue Got Married, Smokey and the Bandit and Steel Magnolias. His television credits include executive producing of The Goodbye Girl, writing for Blue Thunder and writing a 1978 episode of Happy Days. He later became a member of the Writers Guild of America and the Academy of Motion Picture Arts and Sciences.

== Personal life ==
In 2005, he retired and moved to Tumwater, Washington, with his wife Jill Elledge, whom he married in 1990. They had three daughters. In retirement, Safran wrote novels and short stories. After his wife died in 2013, he moved back to Dallas to be closer to two of his daughters. He died, aged 84, of congestive heart failure in February 2014.
