= Julian Curry =

English actor (1937–2020)

Julian Burnlee Curry
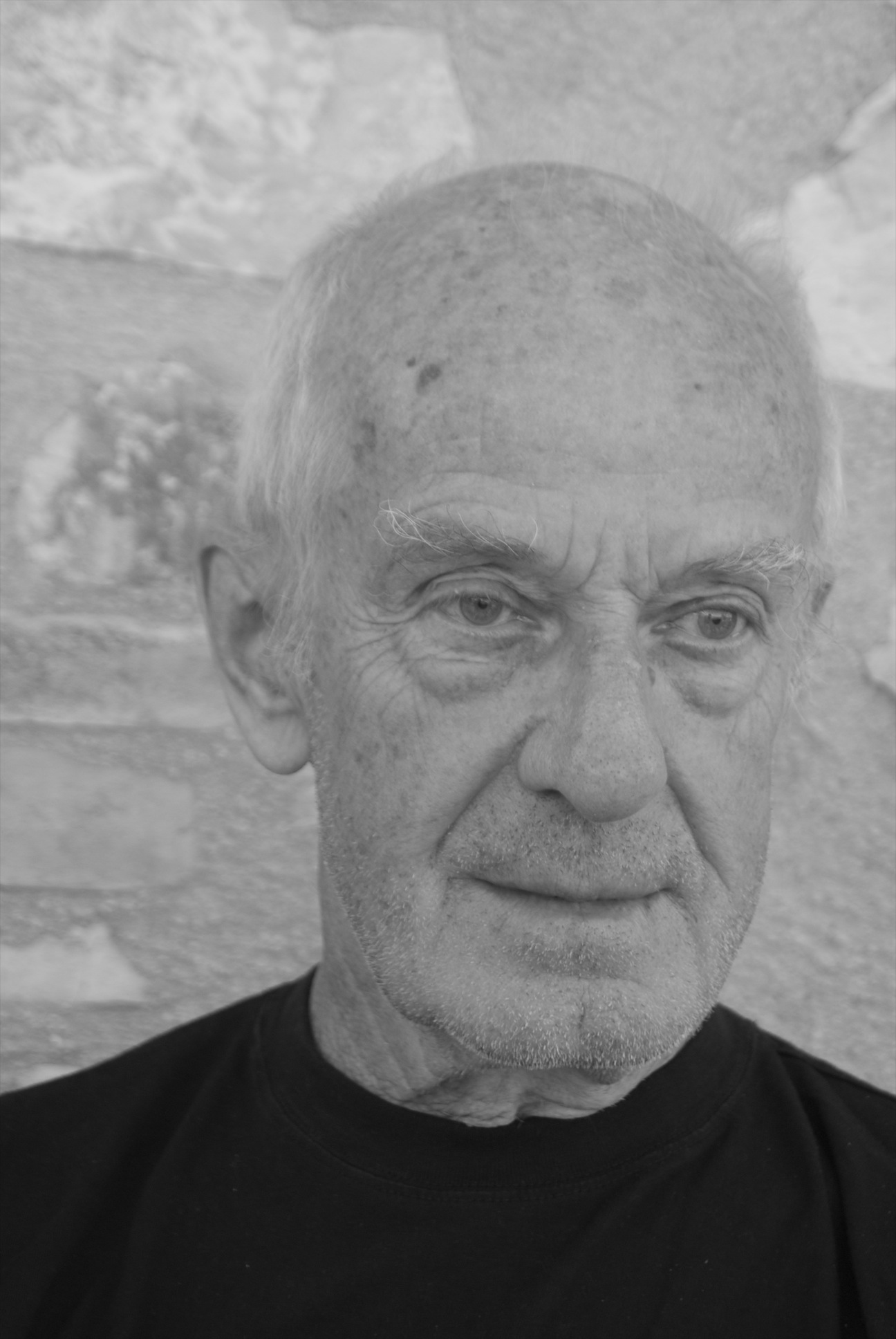
- Julian Curry at the STR annual Theatre Book Prize presentation in May 2011
- Born: 8 December 1937; Devon, England
- Died: 27 June 2020 (aged 82)
- Years active: 1965-2008
- Height: 6"0
- Spouse(s): Sheila Reid 1967 (dissolved); Josephine Edmunds (dissolved); two sons Mary Chater

Julian Burnlee Curry (8 December 1937 – 27 June 2020) was an English actor best known for playing Claude Erskine-Browne in ITV's legal comedy-drama Rumpole of the Bailey.

== Early life ==
The son of William Burnlee Curry (1900–1962), headmaster of Dartington Hall School from 1930 to 1957, and Marjorie Graham (née McIldowie), Curry was educated at Dartington Hall School and King's College, Cambridge.

== Television appearances ==
Curry made his first television appearance in 1965 in an episode of the series For Whom the Bell Tolls. Other TV appearances include roles in Pride and Prejudice (1967), Softly, Softly (1968), Nicholas Nickleby (1968), Z-Cars (1965 & 1975), The Floater (1975), The Way of the World (1975), Brassneck (1975), The Glittering Prizes (1976), Trilby (1976), The Onedin Line (1976), Campion's Interview (1977), Rumpole of the Bailey (1977–1992), The Life of Shakespeare (1978), Prince Regent (1979), The Vanishing Army (1980), Psy Warriors (1981), A Fine Romance (1982), the BBC Television Shakespeare production of King Lear (1982), The New Statesman (1984), Three Up, Two Down (1985), Lytton's Diary (1985–86), Death of a Son (1989), Around the World in 80 Days (1989), Sherlock Holmes (1991), Thatcher: The Final Days (1991), Inspector Morse (1993), Bugs – Assassins Inc (1995), It Might Be You (1995), Kavanagh QC (1997), The Wyvern Mystery (2000), Adrian Mole: The Cappuccino Years (2001), The Hunt (2001), Prince William (2002), Stig of the Dump (2002), Midsomer Murders (2004), The Brief (2005), and The Queen's Sister (2005).

== Film roles ==
Curry's film appearances included The Mini-Affair (1968), The Brontë Sisters (1979), Manions of America (1981), Escape to Victory (1981), The Missionary (1982), Baby: Secret of the Lost Legend (1985), Fall From Grace (1994), Loch Ness (1996), Rasputin: Dark Servant of Destiny (1996), Seven Days to Live (2000), and Sky Captain and the World of Tomorrow (2004).

== Theatre work ==
His appearances with the Royal Shakespeare Company included roles in Doctor Faustus (1969), Much Ado About Nothing (1969), The Hollow Crown (1976), Pleasure and Repentance (1976), The Winter's Tale, (1984), The Crucible (1984), Krapp's Last Tape (1984), The Danton Affair (1986), King John (1989), Henry VI (1989), The Merchant of Venice (1997), Talk of the City (1998), Back to Methuselah (2001) and Women Beware Women (2006). At the National Theatre he appeared in Measure for Measure (1973), The Bacchae (1973), and The Alchemist (2006). Other major stage appearances include roles in Hamlet (1971), The Black and White Minstrels (1973), Donkey's Years (1976), The Importance of Being Earnest (1977), The Achurch Letters (1978), Outside Edge (1979), The Duchess of Malfi (1981), Nightshade (1984), Samuel Beckett's Company (1987), Timon of Athens (1991), Cyrano de Bergerac (1992), Lust - the musical (1993), Richard 2nd (2006) and Love - the musical (2008). He toured with the Old Vic Company, the RSC and Prospect Theatre Company.

== Other work ==
Curry also held a diploma from the Wine and Spirit Education Trust, and was for some years a freelance member of the Circle of Wine Writers. He performed his one-man entertainment Hic! or The Entire History of Wine (abridged) over 150 times in many parts of the world. He wrote and recorded the Naxos audiobook A Guide to Wine. He was also the author of Shakespeare on Stage, a collection of interviews with thirteen leading actors focussing on specific Shakespearean roles. It was nominated as 2011 Theatre Book of the Year. In "Shakespeare on Stage" Curry interviewed Brian Cox (about the title role of Titus Andronicus), Judi Dench (Juliet), Ralph Fiennes (about the title role of Coriolanus), Rebecca Hall (Rosalind from As You Like It), Derek Jacobi (Malvolio from Twelfth Night), Jude Law (Hamlet), Adrian Lester (Henry V), Ian McKellen (Macbeth), Helen Mirren (Cleopatra), Tim Pigott-Smith (Leontes from A Winter's Tale), Kevin Spacey (Richard II), Patrick Stewart (Prospero from The Tempest), and Penelope Wilton (Isabella from Measure for Measure. A second volume of Shakespeare on Stage was published in 2017.

== Personal life ==
He was married on three occasions:

- Actress Sheila Reid (dissolved).
- Josephine Edmunds (dissolved);
  two sons, Finn and Patrick.
- Actress and writer Mary Chater until his death.

== Partial filmography ==
- Smashing Time (1967)
- The Mini-Affair (1968) – Ronnie
- The Brontë Sisters (1979) – Mr. Smith
- Big Wheels and Sailor (1979) – Dave Adams
- Escape to Victory (1981) – Shurlock – The English
- The Missionary (1982) – Portland, first friend of Raggy Masterson
- Baby: Secret of the Lost Legend (1985) – Etienne
- Terry on the Fence (1986) – Clerk of the Court
- Hollywood Monster (1987) – Lawyer
- The Case-Book of Sherlock Holmes: The Disappearance of Lady Frances Carfax (1991) - Albert Shlessinger
- Fall From Grace (1994) – Cavendish
- Loch Ness (1996) – Englishman
- Rasputin: Dark Servant of Destiny (1996) – Dr. Lazovert
- Vanished! A Video Seance (1999) – Father
- Seven Days to Live (2000) – Prof. Ed Saunders
- Sky Captain and the World of Tomorrow (2004) – Dr. Vargas
