= Ann Veronica (TV series) =

- Genre: Period drama
- Based on: Ann Veronica by H. G. Wells
- Written by: Denis Constanduros
- Directed by: Christopher Barry
- Starring: Rosemary Nicols
- Country of origin: United Kingdom
- Original language: English
- No. of series: 1
- No. of episodes: 4

Production
- Producer: Douglas Allen
- Running time: 45 minutes
- Production company: BBC

Original release
- Network: BBC Two
- Release: 23 May – 13 June 1964

Ann Veronica is a 1964 British television drama series which first aired on BBC 2. It is an adaptation of the 1909 novel of the same title by H. G. Wells. The title role of the Edwardian suffragette was played by Rosemary Nicols. An earlier television film of the novel had been made, starring Margaret Lockwood.

== Cast ==
- Rosemary Nicols as Ann Veronica
- Gay Cameron as Hetty Widgett
- Jean Conroy as Emily
- Margaret Gordon as Miss Miniver
- Laurence Hardy as Mr. Stanley
- Gillian Lind as Miss Stanley
- Sheila Ballantine as Kitty Brett
- Philip Bond as Mr. Capes
- Barrie Ingham as Hubert Manning
- Kay Patrick as Miss Garvice
- Alan Tilvern as Edwin Ramage
- Kitty Atwood as Mrs. Mudge
- Agnes Lauchlan as Lady Palsworthy
- George A. Cooper as Hotel Manager
- Ivor Salter as Police Sergeant Watts

== Bibliography ==
- Ellen Baskin. Serials on British Television, 1950-1994. Scolar Press, 1996.
