= Count Five and Die =

1957 film by Victor Vicas

- Theatrical release poster
- Directed by: Victor Vicas
- Written by: Jack Seddon; David Pursall
- Based on: Count Five and Die by Barry Wynne
- Produced by: Ernest Gartside
- Starring: Jeffrey Hunter; Nigel Patrick; Annemarie Düringer
- Cinematography: Arthur Grant
- Edited by: Russell Lloyd
- Music by: John Wooldridge
- Production company: Zonic Productions
- Distributed by: 20th Century Fox
- Release date: 23 December 1957
- Running time: 92 minutes
- Country: United Kingdom
- Language: English

Count Five and Die is a 1957 British war thriller film directed by Victor Vicas and starring Jeffrey Hunter, Nigel Patrick and Annemarie Düringer. It was made by Zonic Productions and released in Britain and the US by Twentieth Century Fox. It was produced by Ernest Gartside with the screenplay by Jack Seddon and David Pursall, based on the non-fiction book of the same title by Barry Wynne.

== Plot ==
In 1944 London, Major Julien Howard, a British MI6 intelligence agent, meets Captain Bill Ranson, his new American security officer. As Howard was previously picked up by German Abwehr counter-intelligence, Ranson soon realizes that their assignment is to feed misinformation to the Germans about the location of the D-Day landings so they'll believe the Netherlands is the target. Howard tells him the rest of the unit must not know the truth.

While on a date with Rolande Hertog, the unit's radio operator, Ranson returns to the offices where he's shot at by an intruder. He renders his assailant unconscious but Ransan and Hertog fail to prevent the man's accomplice from escaping. Hertog kills the captive, claiming he tried to grab her gun. Howard later criticises Ranson's actions since MI5 had tipped him off the Germans were planning to search his offices. He had hoped to make it easy for the Germans to retrieve planted misinformation. Howard suspects Hertog is a German agent after Jan Guldt, their Dutch underground liaison, was captured immediately on return to the Netherlands.

Howard tests Hertog by sending Piet van Wijt to the Netherlands. He's not heard from again. Howard receives news the Germans are redeploying troops to the Netherlands and orders Ranson to keep seeing Hertog so she won't become suspicious. It doesn't work and Hertog contacts her sector commander, Hauptmann Hans Faber, who is posing as a British dentist. Faber isn't convinced the Netherlands are a ruse and kidnaps the son of Doctor Mulder, Howard's psychological warfare expert. Mulder is forced to reveal the supposed invasion location to save his boy's life.

Mulder confides to Hertog that he still doesn't believe the Netherlands is the place because the two men who were sent behind enemy lines weren't given poisonous cyanide capsules to avoid capture and interrogation. If they had, they could have taken them; then they could "count five and die". Hertog tells Muller to go home, that she will alert Ranson. Instead, she tries once more, and fails, to persuade Faber to change his mind.

Howard and Ranson speak to Mulder and realise the situation. They capture Faber and free Mulder's son although Martins gets away and Faber bites his cyanide capsule. Ranson tracks down Hertog too late to prevent her radio message unmasking the deception. Ranson tries telling her she did exactly what they wanted her to do and that it was all a "double bluff", then forces her to shoot him. She transmits a second message and leaves Ranson for dead. Martins shoots Hertog, who doesn't realize Ranson was still alive.

The epilogue states that on D-Day, "ten German divisions were not in the line. They were north in Holland, waiting for an invasion that never came."

== Cast ==
- Jeffrey Hunter as Captain Bill Ranson
- Nigel Patrick as Major Julien Howard
- Annemarie Düringer as Rolande Hertog
- David Kossoff as Dr. Mulder
- Rolf Lefebvre as Hans Faber
- Larry Burns as Martins, the building porter and German spy
- Philip Bond as Piet van Wijt, in charge of radio operations
- Arthur Gross as Jan Guldt
- Robert Raglan as Lieutenant Miller, a member of Howard's unit
- Peter Prouse as Sergeant Bill Parrish, a member of Howard's unit
- Otto Diamant as Mr. Hendrijk, who prints what his wife writes
- Wolf Frees as Brauner, the spy killed by Hertog
- Anthony Ostrer
- Marianne Walla as Mrs. Hendrijk, a writer on Howard's staff
- Philip Ray
- Beth Rogan as Mary Ann Lennig, Howard's curvaceous decoder

== Production ==
Jeffrey Hunter was under contract to Fox at the time.

== Bibliography ==
- Clinton, Franz Anthony. British Thrillers, 1950-1979: 845 Films of Suspense, Mystery, Murder and Espionage. McFarland, 2020.
