= Marianne Walla =

Austrian film and theater actress

Marianne Walla was an Austrian film and theater actress. After Hitler's Anschluss of Austria she was forced to emigrate to Great Britain.

== Career ==
Little is known about the life and work of Marianne Walla. She performed the role Good Works in Jedermann by Hugo von Hofmannsthal at the Salzburg Festival from 1930 to 1937. Only two further productions in Austria are documented, both at ABC im Regenbogen in Vienna, both in plays by Jura Soyfer. In 1937, she was seen in Die Botschaft von Astoria, in 1938 she embodied the Queen in Broadway-Melodie 1492, directed by Rudolf Steinböck.

After her emigration to London, she participated in the opening of the Austrian exile stage Das Laterndl on 27 June 1939. The performances took place at the Austrian Center and were directed by Martin Miller, another emigrant from Austria. Again she performed in a play by Soyfer, she played Fritzi in The Lechner Edi looks into paradise. In 1943, she married British citizen John M. Brice.

In the post-war years, she performed in several film and television productions.

== Filmography ==
Title	Year	Role	Director
Odette	1950	SS Wardress	Herbert Wilcox
The Divided Heart	1954		Charles Crichton
Breakaway	1955		Henry Cass
Overseas Press Club: Two Against the Kremlin	1957		
A Time of Day	1957		
Count Five and Die	1957	Mrs. Hendrijk	Victor Vicas
The Captain of Koepenick	1958		
Carve Her Name with Pride	1958		Lewis Gilbert
Magnolia Street	1961		
Storyboard	1961		
