= The Pleasure Girls =

1965 British film by Gerry O'Hara

- DVD cover
- Directed by: Gerry O'Hara
- Written by: Gerry O'Hara
- Produced by: Harry Fine; Michael Klinger; Robert Sterne
- Starring: Ian McShane; Francesca Annis; Klaus Kinski; Mark Eden; Tony Tanner; Suzanna Leigh; Rosemary Nicols
- Cinematography: Michael Reed
- Edited by: Anthony Palk
- Music by: Malcolm Lockyer
- Production companies: Compton Films (UK), Tekli British Productions (UK)
- Distributed by: Compton-Cameo Films
- Release date: 3 December 1965
- Running time: 88 minutes
- Country: United Kingdom
- Language: English
- Budget: £30,000

The Pleasure Girls is a 1965 British drama film directed and written by Gerry O'Hara and starring Francesca Annis, Ian McShane and Klaus Kinski.

== Plot ==
When Sally moves to London to pursue a modelling career, she moves in with Angela and Dee and discovers the world of the carefree "bachelor girl" in the Swinging London of the 1960s. Over one weekend – filled with parties, blossoming friendships, and romantic encounters with Keith and Nikko – the vivacious women learn about life's pleasures and pains.

== Cast ==
- Francesca Annis as Sally
- Ian McShane as Keith Dexter
- Klaus Kinski as Nikko Stalmar
- Tony Tanner as Paddy
- Mark Eden as Prinny
- Suzanna Leigh as Dee
- Anneke Wills as Angela
- Rosemary Nicols as Marion
- Carol Cleveland as Ella
- Peter Diamond as Rat-Face
- Tony Doonan as Reilly
- Colleen Fitzpatrick as Cobber
- Hugh Futcher as Pablo
- Hal Hamilton as Peter 'E'-Type
- Jonathan Hansen as Ivor
- Yvonne Antrobus as waitress
- David Graham as 1st gambler
- Julian Holloway as hanger-on
- Brian Cant as man in pub (uncredited)

== Production ==
The film was based on a script by Gerry O'Hara. Film producer Raymond Stross liked the dialogue of one of O'Hara's other scripts and asked to read anything else the writer-director had. Stross suggested O'Hara write something set in Chelsea, so he wrote his script "A Time and a Place", which became The Pleasure Girls.

In a 2010 interview O'Hara said: "Probably our biggest star was Klaus Kinski, who got £900 for 10 days work in the film, just before he went off to appear in Dr. Zhivago. The entire shoot was only 20 days. It was shot in a house in Kensington; we didn’t have the money for a studio. Plus, it made the whole thing that much more realistic. Michael Reed shot it; he was very fast, very good. ... I hated the title, and I hated the title music. It had nothing to do with the film! But they didn’t consult me about it, so that’s what happened. Still, I think the movie is rather good."

== Release ==
=== Critical reception ===
On the film's release Kine Weekly said: "This is very nearly a very good film, but it lacks the essential fullness of construction. However with the aid of a title that promises more than the story provides, it should please quite a large public. ... Points of appeal: sex, pretty girls, saucy title and quota ticket".

Variety reviewed the film as "Slim, superficial yarn about young femme problems amid the bright lights; familiar situations, but some fair budding talent and occasional crisp direction of a routine pic".

Sight and Sound wrote: "The London portrayed here is in transition and full of contradictions; we're on the cusp of the permissive Swinging 60s, and there are new freedoms for bachelor girls sharing a flat. At the same time, the old hierarchies are still in place – 'nice' girls don't have sex before marriage. ... It's a fascinating social document and is less dated than might be expected. Some of the dialogue may now grate a little but there is menace and intensity to the storytelling."

Leslie Halliwell said: "The road to ruin sixties style, hackneyed but quite well observed."

David Parkinson in The Radio Times Guide to Films gave the film 2/5 stars, writing: "This attempt to show the problems facing a young model in the Swinging Sixties is an exasperating effort from writer/director Gerry O'Hara, who seems to think that incessant references to sexual freedom are enough to sustain a paper-thin story about the ever-changing relationships of Francesca Annis and her flatmates. The script strains every sinew to be gear and fab."

=== Home media ===
The film was published in dual format edition (containing both DVD & Blu-ray on the one disc) by the BFI. It was released as part of the "Flipside" strand. It was produced in an alternative export cut (Blu-ray only) and export version scenes (DVD only).
