= Odette (1950 film) =

British war film

- Directed by: Herbert Wilcox
- Screenplay by: Warren Chetham-Strode
- Based on: Odette: The Story of a British Agent by Jerrard Tickell
- Produced by: Herbert Wilcox; Anna Neagle
- Starring: Anna Neagle; Trevor Howard; Marius Goring; Bernard Lee; Peter Ustinov
- Cinematography: Mutz Greenbaum (credited as Max Greene)
- Edited by: Bill Lewthwaite
- Music by: Anthony Collins
- Production company: Wilcox-Neagle Productions
- Distributed by: British Lion Films
- Release dates: 6 June 1950 (UK); 27 March 1951 (US)
- Running time: 124 minutes
- Country: United Kingdom
- Language: English
- Box office: £269,463 (UK); 2,251,983 admissions (France)

Odette is a 1950 British war film based on the true story of Special Operations Executive French agent, Odette Sansom, living in England, who was captured by the Germans in 1943, condemned to death and sent to Ravensbrück concentration camp to be executed. However, against all odds she survived the war and testified against the prison guards at the Hamburg Ravensbrück trials. She was awarded the George Cross in 1946; the first woman ever to receive the award, and the only woman who has been awarded it while still alive.

Anna Neagle plays Odette Sansom and Trevor Howard plays Peter Churchill, the British agent she mainly worked with and married after the war. Peter Ustinov plays their Jewish radio operator Alex Rabinovitch, Cr de Guerre, OBE, MiD. Colonel Maurice Buckmaster, who was head of the SOE's French Section, played himself in the film, as did Paddy Sproule, another FANY female SOE agent.

== Plot ==
In response to a radio broadcast request for photographs of France, mother of three Odette Sansom sends a letter to the Admiralty, but an addressing mistake brings her to the attention of the Special Operations Executive, who need French people to go back to their homeland as espionage agents. She completes her training in September 1942 and is sent to France.

She travels to Cannes, where she is met by Captain Peter Churchill, her superior. She also meets "Arnaud" (Adolphe Rabinovitch), another agent. Her first assignment is to go to Marseilles to pick up plans for the docks there.

Barely warned in time of a raid organized by Abwehr Colonel Henri (Hugo Bleicher) in Cannes, Odette, Peter and Arnaud are forced to relocate to Annecy, where they rendezvous with Jacques. Learning of the Maquis, Peter requests arms, medicines, etc. for them. He is then recalled to London. A large airdrop of supplies is arranged.

Later, however, Henri finds Odette in Annecy. From a captured agent, he has learned all about Odette's network and claims that he and others, disaffected with Hitler, wish to make contact with the British. However, she suspects otherwise and orders the other agents to disperse. Shortly after Peter returns to France, she and Peter are captured in Annecy by Henri and eventually taken to Fresnes Prison, near Paris; Arnauld was away when the hotel where they were staying was raided.

Odette is tortured by the Gestapo, but does not break and is sentenced to death. An apologetic Henri visits her; at her request, he arranges for her to see Peter one last time, though she hides her fate from him. She is then taken to Ravensbrück concentration camp on 26 July 1944 and immediately placed in solitary confinement. The Germans believe Odette's lies about Peter, that he is related to Winston Churchill and that she was the brains of the network, while he was a playboy dilettante, and he is merely imprisoned.

With Germany invaded and collapsing, on 16 April 1945, the camp commandant is ordered to execute his prisoners, but he orders a subordinate to see to Odette's safety. When the inmates learn that Hitler is dead, they riot. A guard comes for Odette; she believes she is to be executed, but the commandant instead takes her to the advancing Americans, believing another of her lies, that she is Peter's wife and therefore related to the British Prime Minister. Back in England, she is reunited with Peter.

The end of the film contains a title card saying as follows:

"It is with a sense of deep humility that I allow my personal story to be told. I am a very ordinary woman to whom a chance was given to see human beings at their best and at their worst. I knew kindness as well as cruelty, understanding as well as brutality. My comrades, who did far more than I and suffered far more profoundly, are not here to speak. It is to their memory that this film has been made and I would like it to be a window through which may be seen those very gallant women with whom I had the honour to serve."
Odette Churchill

== Cast ==
- Anna Neagle as Odette Sansom
- Trevor Howard as Captain Peter Churchill
- Marius Goring as Colonel Henri (Hugo Bleicher)
- Peter Ustinov as "Arnaud" (Alex Rabinovitch)
- Bernard Lee as Jack
- Maurice Buckmaster as Himself
- Alfred Schieske as Camp Commandant Fritz Suhren
- Gilles Quéant as Jacques
- Marianne Walla as SS Wardress
- F. R. Wendhausen as Colonel

== Production ==
The film was directed by Herbert Wilcox, and the screenplay by Warren Chetham-Strode was based on Jerrard Tickell's non-fiction book Odette: The Story of a British Agent. It was jointly produced by the husband and wife team Herbert Wilcox and Anna Neagle.

Neagle was originally reluctant to play the role so Wilcox offered it to Michèle Morgan and Ingrid Bergman, both of whom turned it down. Eventually when the real Odette suggested Neagle play her, Neagle agreed.

Both Odette Sansom (by then Odette Churchill) and Peter Churchill served as technical advisors during the filming, and the film ends with a written message from Odette herself. Sansom and Neagle spent considerable time in France, visiting locales associated with the story. Sansom later said that Neagle "was absolutely into it. In fact it took one year after the end of the film to get back to normal, she was more upset by doing that film than I was reliving the experience." Sansom said that she lobbied intensely for the film not to be made in Hollywood, for fear that it would be fictionalised, and that she was pleased by the result.

== Reception ==
It premiered at a Royal Command Film Performance before King George VI and Queen Elizabeth at the Plaza Cinema, London on 6 June 1950.

=== Box office ===
The film was the fourth most popular movie at the British box office in 1950. According to Kinematograph Weekly the 'biggest winners' at the box office in 1950 Britain were The Blue Lamp, The Happiest Days of Your Life, Annie Get Your Gun, The Wooden Horse, Treasure Island and Odette, with "runners up" being Stage Fright, White Heat, They Were Not Divided, Trio, Morning Departure, Destination Moon, Sands of Iwo Jima, Little Women, The Forsythe Saga, Father of the Bride, Neptune's Daughter, The Dancing Years, Red Light, Rogues of Sherwood Forest, Fancy Pants, Copper Canyon, State Secret, The Cure for Love, My Foolish Heart, Stromboli, Cheaper by the Dozen, Pinky, Three Came Home, Broken Arrow and The Black Rose.

Wilcox later said it was his most profitable film.

=== Critical ===
New York Times critic Bosley Crowther said that the film portrays "a pretty punk secret agent" who "lacks the wit or caution to avoid a most obvious trap that is set for her" by Henri. Crowther wrote that "the point of the picture, so far as we can see, is to get Miss Neagle into prison, as quickly as possible, so she can suffer elaborately. And this she does, like the stalwart and noble lady-actress that she is. For the rest of the picture, Miss Neagle is tortured—and so are we."

According to Sue Harper and Vincent Porter, although Wilcox's "direction is uninspired and the production values inert, the film was probably successful because of its novelty value in dealing with female war heroism. At the same time, it may have made the audience feel secure by its old-fashioned practice of flashing dates and places on the screen."
