= The Mini-Affair =

1967 British film by Robert Amram

- Directed by: Robert Amram
- Written by: Robert Amram; Richard Herland
- Produced by: Geoffrey Forster; Richard Herland; Thomas Vickers
- Starring: Georgie Fame; Rosemary Nicols; John Clive
- Cinematography: Derek Waterman
- Edited by: John Ireland
- Music by: Alan Blaikley; Ken Howard
- Production company: United Screen Arts
- Release date: 1968
- Running time: 92 minutes
- Country: United Kingdom
- Language: English

The Mini-Affair (originally titled The Mini-Mob) is a 1968 British romantic comedy film directed by Robert Amram and starring Georgie Fame, Rosemary Nicols and John Clive. Music is provided by the Bee Gees.

== Plot summary ==
A leading pop star and a pirate DJ are kidnapped by a trio of girls in swinging London who are desperate for marriage.

== Cast ==
- Georgie Fame as Georgie Hart
- Rosemary Nicols as Charlotte
- John Clive as Joe
- Bernard Archard as Sir Basil Grinling
- Lucille Soong as Lucille
- Rick Dane as Mike Maroon
- Julian Curry as Ronnie
- Gretchen Regan as Marianne
- Madeline Smith as Samantha
- Clement Freud as Stephen Catchpole
- Totti Truman Taylor as Aunt Grace
- Clive Dunn as Tyson
- Roy Kinnear as fire extinguisher salesman
- Eric Pohlmann as world banker
- William Rushton as Chancellor of the Exchequer
- Irene Handl as cook in Chinese restaurant
- Guy Middleton as Colonel Highwater
- Ben Aris as TV producer
- Milton Reid as fisherman
