= Thea Holme =

British actress and writer (1904–1980)

Thea Holme (nee Johnston, 1904–1980) was a British actress and writer.

Holme was born Thea Johnston in 1904. Her father was the architect Philip Mainwaring Johnston. She studied art at The Slade and then theatre at the Central School of Drama. She made her professional stage debut in 1924 as Hippolyta in A Midsummer Night's Dream, at the Richmond Theatre.

She was in repertory at the Oxford Playhouse, where her husband Stanford Holme was producer, in the 1930s. She performed for both the Council for the Encouragement of Music and the Arts and the BBC Repertory Company during World War II, as well as directing at the Open Air Theatre in Regent's Park. Holme also appeared for BBC television in several adaptations of classic novels including The Warden, Emma, Persuasion and Nicholas Nickleby. She was also a dramatist, adapting works for stage and radio, including Jane Austen's Mansfield Park and Northanger Abbey. She subsequently moved with her husband to Carlyle's House in Cheyne Row, Chelsea, London, when he became its curator, working for the National Trust. She took up writing, beginning with a book about the lives of Thomas Carlyle and his wife Jane Welsh Carlyle at the house, The Carlyles at Home (1965).

She appeared as a castaway on the BBC Radio programme Desert Island Discs on 4 October 1969, and was made a Fellow of the Royal Society of Literature.

She died in 1980. An obituary was published in The Times on 9 December. Her husband survived her, as did their son, Timothy Holme, an author of fiction.

== Bibliography ==
- —— (1965). The Carlyles at Home. Oxford University Press. ISBN 978-0192121592.
- —— (1972). Chelsea. Hamish Hamilton. ISBN 978-0241016923.
- —— (1976). Prinny's Daughter: Biography of Princess Charlotte of Wales. Hamish Hamilton.
- —— (1979). Caroline: Biography of Caroline of Brunswick. Hamish Hamilton. ISBN 978-0241101629.
