= Brown Eye, Evil Eye =

1967 film

- Film poster
- Directed by: Robert Angus
- Written by: Robert Angus
- Produced by: Kay Lewis
- Starring: Hugh Griffith; Rosemary Nicols; Ron Thompson; Jojo Munroe
- Cinematography: Nenad Jovicic
- Edited by: Marija Fuks
- Music by: Michael Colicchio
- Release date: 1967
- Running time: 80 minutes
- Countries: United States; Yugoslavia
- Language: English

Brown Eye, Evil Eye (also known as Smede Oko Zlo Oko) is a 1967 film starring Hugh Griffith, Rosemary Nicols, Ron Thompson and directed by Robert Angus.

== Plot ==
The story of the strange friendship between a seventy-year-old man and a six-year-old girl.

== Cast ==
- Hugh Griffith as Tadeusz Bridges
- Rosemary Nicols as Mrs. Wilson
- Ron Thompson as Freddy St. Claire
- Jojo Munroe as Hildi Wilson
