= Marian-glas =

Village in Anglesey, Wales

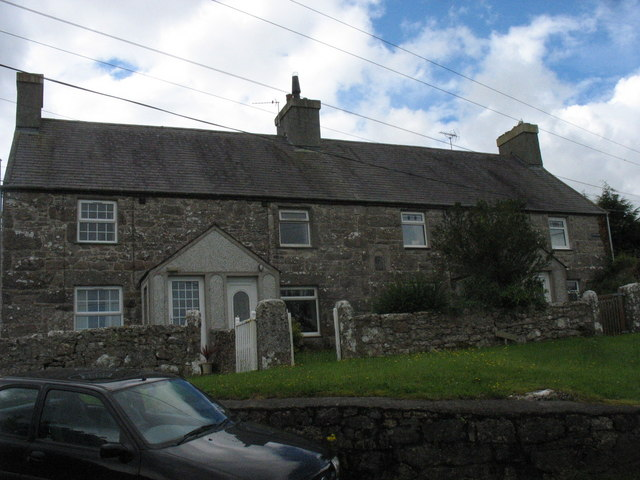
- Henefail Cottages in Marian-glas

- Location within Anglesey
- OS grid reference: SH503843
- Community: Llaneugrad
- Principal area: Anglesey
- Preserved county: Gwynedd
- Country: Wales
- Sovereign state: United Kingdom
- Post town: MARIANGLAS
- Postcode district: LL73
- Dialling code: 01248
- Police: North Wales
- Fire: North Wales
- Ambulance: Welsh
- UK Parliament: Ynys Môn
- Senedd Cymru – Welsh Parliament: Bangor Conwy Môn

Marian-glas or Marianglas (Welsh pronunciation) is a small village in Anglesey, north-west Wales. It lies between the larger villages of Moelfre and Benllech and just off the A5025. There is a large caravan park on the edge of the village and several camp sites. There is a church and pub but no shop. It has a memorial to those killed in the two world wars, including a list of 17 seamen from the Merchant Navy.

Marian-glas Hut Group is an unenclosed hut circle (53.3379°N 4.2516°W, SH501846). This Scheduled Ancient Monument (Cadw SAM No. AN093) is a roundhouse settlement dating at least back to Roman times. It is also called Cae Marh Hut Group. There are several huts with thick walls, some standing up to 1.4m high. Some of the huts' walls are now obscured by a thicket, while others are visible as wall lines in the lawns of Marianglas caravan park. The location is indicated on the ground through a signboard by the Ministry of Public Building and Works (which dates the sign to 1962–70).

== Notable people ==
- Elen Roger Jones (1908–1999) a Welsh actress and teacher.
- Hugh Griffith (1912–1980) Academy Award-winning film, stage, and TV actor; Elen Roger Jones' brother.

== Gallery ==
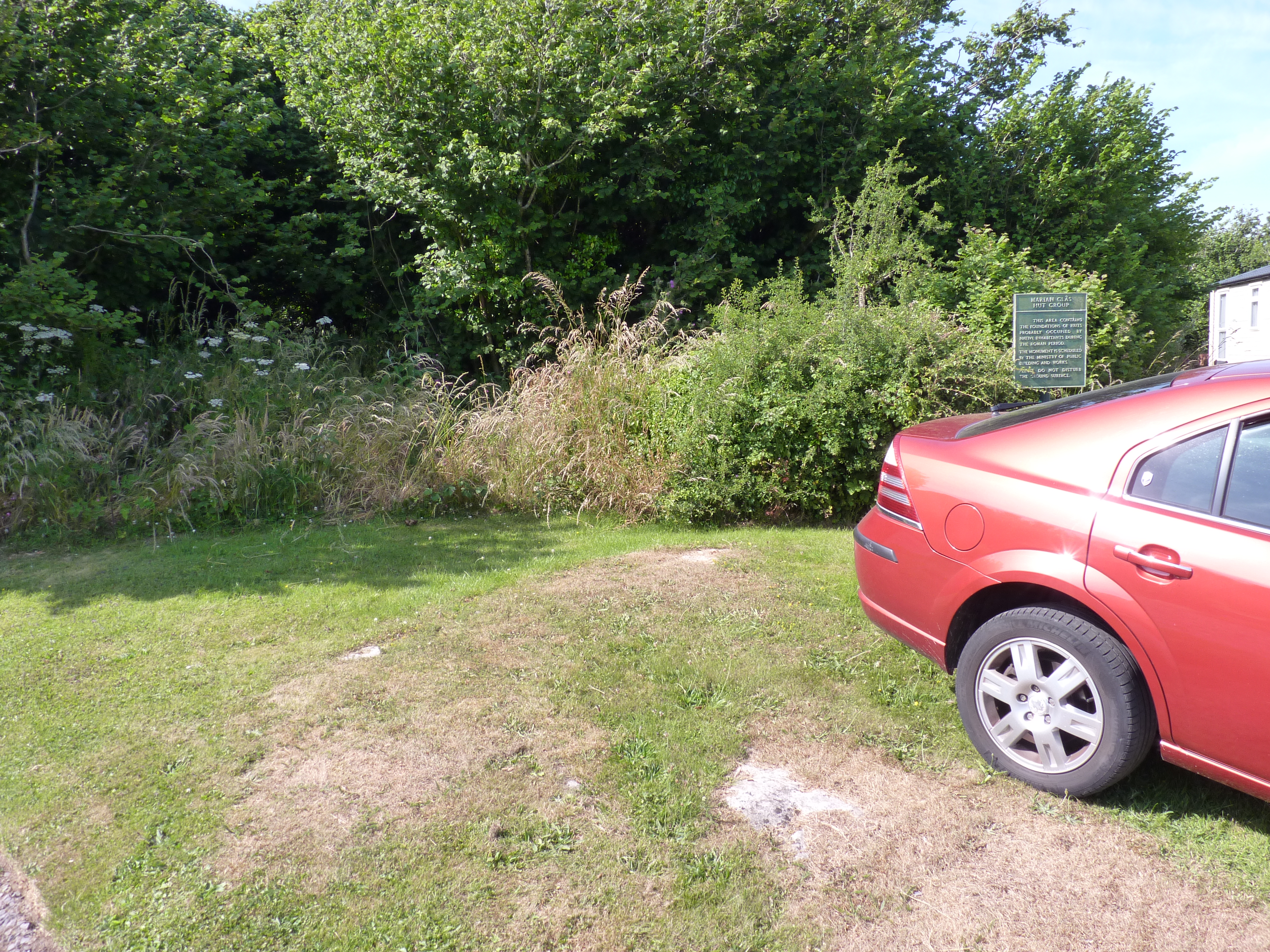
Marian-glas Hut Group and Ministry of Works sign

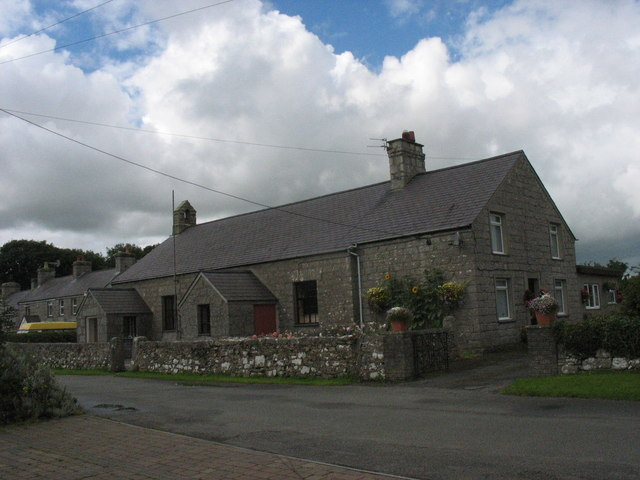
Yr Hen Ysgol - a former school building facing the green at Marian-Glas
