= Happy Days season 6 =

Season 6 of the television series Happy Days

Happy Days
- Season 6
- No. of episodes: 27

Release
- Original network: ABC
- Original release: September 5, 1978 – May 15, 1979

Season chronology
- ← Previous; Season 5 Next → Season 7

This is a list of episodes from the sixth season of Happy Days.

== Main cast ==
- Ron Howard as Richie Cunningham
- Henry Winkler as Arthur "Fonzie" Fonzarelli
- Marion Ross as Marion Cunningham
- Anson Williams as Warren "Potsie" Weber
- Don Most as Ralph Malph
- Erin Moran as Joanie Cunningham
- Al Molinaro as Alfred "Al" Delvecchio
- Scott Baio as Chachi Arcola
- Tom Bosley as Howard Cunningham

== Guest stars ==
- Lynda Goodfriend as Lori Beth Allen
- Ed Peck as Officer Kirk
- Suzi Quatro as Leather Tuscadero
- Lorrie Mahaffey as Jennifer Jerome
- Pat Morita as Arnold
- Penny Marshall as Laverne De Fazio
- Cindy Williams as Shirley Feeney
- Robin Williams as Mork
- Michael McKean as Leonard "Lenny" Kosnowski
- David L. Lander as Andrew "Squiggy" Squiggman
- Eddie Mekka as Carmine Ragusa

== Broadcast history ==
The season aired Tuesdays at 8:00-8:30 pm (EST).

== Episodes ==
No. overall	No. in season	Title	Directed by	Written by	Original release date
116 117	1 2	"Westward Ho!: Parts 1 and 2"	Jerry Paris	Walter Kempley	September 12, 1978
The dude ranch operated by Marion's Uncle Ben is in danger of being taken over by crooked neighbor H.R. Buchanan; so the Cunninghams set off for Colorado to come to the rescue; with Potsie, Ralph, Al and Fonzie all in tow. The gang needs to come up with enough money in five days to save the ranch, and they enter the 7th Annual Bar-A-Rodeo to try to win the prize money to defray the payment. Absent: Scott Baio as Chachi Arcola.
118	3	"Westward Ho!: Part 3"	Jerry Paris	Fred Fox, Jr.	September 19, 1978
With the deadline for payment looming, the gang is still trying to raise the money to save Uncle Ben's Colorado ranch. In a desperate last-ditch effort—and trying to reassert his coolness—Fonzie volunteers to try to ride a killer bull for the $1,000 prize money. Absent: Scott Baio as Chachi Arcola.
119	4	"Fonzie's Blindness"	Jerry Paris	Ron Leavitt & Richard Rosenstock	September 26, 1978
When Al accidentally strikes him on the head with a metal tray, Fonzie loses his sight. With the possibility of his blindness being permanent, Fonzie struggles to come to terms with it; but Richie is determined to make his friend face the situation and revive his morale. So he has Potsie and Ralph take apart Fonzie's motorcycle, and leaves a helpless Fonzie in his apartment to conquer his blindness and repair the motorcycle, which he ultimately does. Absent: Scott Baio as Chachi Arcola.
120	5	"Casanova Cunningham"	Jerry Paris	Bob Brunner	October 3, 1978
Richie concocts a cover story to tell Lori Beth when he's actually escorting a baton twirler to the fraternity dance. Does this mean the end of their relationship? Absent: Scott Baio as Chachi Arcola.
121	6	"Kid Stuff"	Jerry Paris	Fred Fox, Jr.	October 10, 1978
Fonzie has developed a very close bond with Bobby, the young son of his latest flame Peggy. But when Peggy tells Fonzie that she plans to try to patch up the relationship with her estranged husband (Bruce Weitz), Fonzie must face not seeing Peggy's son anymore. Absent: Scott Baio as Chachi Arcola.
122	7	"Sweet Sixteen"	Jerry Paris	Brian Levant	October 17, 1978
A party is planned for Joanie's sixteenth birthday. Everyone except Marion is pleased that she intends to date high school football star Tip Corrigan (Ray Underwood), until Joanie finds that he is a liar and a cheat. With the big party looming, will she be able to find her dream date in time? Note: Although out of order, this was the first episode of the season produced. Absent: Scott Baio as Chachi Arcola.
123	8	"Fearless Malph"	Jerry Paris	Walter Kempley	October 24, 1978
When Richie begins a writing project on people's phobias; he, Potsie, and Ralph visit an eccentric Austrian professor (Leon Askin) to try to cure Ralph's numerous neuroses. When the professor predicts an imminent tornado, Ralph panics—until the professor hypnotizes him, bringing out a completely different side of Ralph's personality. Absent: Scott Baio as Chachi Arcola.
124	9	"The Evil Eye"	Jerry Paris	Allen Goldstein	October 31, 1978
In the season's Halloween episode, Al is cowering in terror at a curse he believes he has received from an old lady. So at Fonzie's suggestion; Richie, Ralph, and Potsie arrange a mock exorcism to banish Al's demons. Absent: Scott Baio as Chachi Arcola.
125	10	"The Claw Meets the Fonz" "The Godfonzer"	Jerry Paris	Susanne Gayle Harris	November 3, 1978
Al is thinking about taking on a partner to create an Arnold's franchise, but his supposed partner turns out to be a gangster who, with his henchmen, try to intimidate Al into signing them up as partners whether he likes it or not. Fonzie and the gang try to come up with a plan to put the goons out of business. Absent: Scott Baio as Chachi Arcola. Side note: Episode aired on Friday instead of Tuesday.
126	11	"The Fonz Is Allergic to Girls"	Jerry Paris	Mary-David Sheiner & Sheila Judis Weisberg	November 14, 1978
Fonzie becomes convinced that he is allergic to girls, and decides to give up his dating life. Richie tries to find a cure to help his best friend get back to normal. Side note: This episode marks the first time Chachi appears this season. Scott Baio is billed as Chachi Arcola for the first time in the closing credits; a variant of the opening credits featuring Baio would be introduced later in the season.
127	12	"The First Thanksgiving"	Jerry Paris	Bob Howard	November 21, 1978
Upset that the family is set on watching football on television at Thanksgiving instead of celebrating in a more traditional manner, Marion tells the story of the first Thanksgiving with the cast playing various historical characters. Absent: Scott Baio as Chachi Arcola.
128	13	"The Kissing Bandit"	Jerry Paris	Beverly Bloomberg	November 28, 1978
After Richie is mistakenly arrested for being the "kissing bandit," Fonzie helps him set a trap to expose the real culprit. Absent: Scott Baio as Chachi Arcola.
129	14	"The Magic Show"	Jerry Paris	Don Safran	December 5, 1978
Howard and Al have a big magic act booked for their lodge meeting. But when the magician is injured, who will take his place? Absent: Scott Baio as Chachi Arcola.
130	15	"Richie Gets Framed"	Jerry Paris	Fred Maio	December 12, 1978
Richie is running for student council president, but is unwittingly photographed in a compromising position at a massage parlor. Ralph and Potsie devise a plan to get the potentially scandalous photo back from Richie's election rival—but are they doing the right thing? Absent: Scott Baio as Chachi Arcola.
131	16	"Christmas Time"	Jerry Paris	Beverly Bloomberg	December 19, 1978
It's Christmas 1960, and Fonzie refuses to accept a Christmas gift that arrived from his estranged father. Absent: Scott Baio as Chachi Arcola.
132	17	"Smokin' Ain't Cool"	Jerry Paris	Michael Loman	January 16, 1979
When Joanie starts smoking to retain her membership in a club called the Magnets, both Richie and Howard try to convince her to stop, but to no avail. Fonzie is then called upon to intervene and break Joanie's nasty habit. Guest Stars: Anna Garduno and Michael Dudikoff. Absent: Scott Baio as Chachi Arcola.
133	18	"Ralph vs. Potsie"	Jerry Paris	Michael Loman	January 23, 1979
Richie, in the guise of a magazine agony aunt, gives Ralph and Potsie some bad advice, which leads to the pair falling out and dividing their apartment in half.
134	19	"Stolen Melodies"	Jerry Paris	Brian Levant	January 30, 1979
Leather Tuscadero and the band audition for a popular television music show. They are turned down, whereupon their song is stolen and performed by another band. The gang hatches a plan to make things right.
135	20	"Married Strangers"	Jerry Paris	Bob Howard	February 6, 1979
It's Howard and Marion's 23rd wedding anniversary, but what should be a happy event is spoiled by the couple falling out. Richie and Joanie have arranged for them to go away on a second honeymoon, but will it be enough to turn the situation around?
136	21	"Marion: Fairy Godmother"	Jerry Paris	Fred Maio	February 13, 1979
Leather and Ralph, both lonely and lovelorn, agree to go on a date with each other to a big upcoming party. Leather is concerned that her image turns men off, and asks Marion for some lessons in how to be a lady. Meanwhile, Ralph tries hard to lose his humorous image. Note: Final appearance of Suzi Quatro as Leather Tuscadero.
137	22	"Fonzie's Funeral: Part 1"	Jerry Paris	Michael Loman	February 20, 1979
Fonzie finds a stack of $100 bills in a hearse he is repairing and turns it in to the police, unaware that he is treading on the toes of local crime lord, the "Candyman," who vows to get even.
138	23	"Fonzie's Funeral: Part 2"	Jerry Paris	Michael Loman	February 27, 1979
With Fonzie believed to be dead by the Candyman and his goons, and Ralph and Potsie kidnapped; Richie and company devise a plan to put the criminals out of business by faking Fonzie's funeral. Note: This episode features guest appearances by Arnold (Pat Morita) and a number of Laverne & Shirley cast members, who attend Fonzie's "funeral."
139	24	"Mork Returns" "The Fifth Anniversary Show"	Jerry Paris	Walter Kempley	March 6, 1979
Mork returns from 1979 to revisit Richie, this time to learn about the human concept of friendship in the 1950s from Richie's memories, which are shown through clips from past episodes. Note: Although out of order, this was the last episode of the season produced.
140	25	"The Duel"	Jerry Paris	Fred Fox, Jr.	March 13, 1979
A French fencing champion comes to stay with the Cunninghams, and offends many with his rude attitude. But when he insults America—and Joanie—Fonzie reveals that he is a "black belt" in fencing.
141	26	"Chachi's Incredo-Wax"	Jerry Paris	Dave Ketchum & Tony Di Marco	May 8, 1979
Chachi is swindled by a scam artist into buying a wax spray that turns out to be corrosive; damaging Al's tables, Potsie's hair, Richie's bowling ball, the Cunninghams' chairs, Lori Beth's shoes, and—worst of all—Fonzie's motorcycle seat. Richie and Fonzie plan to get even with the fraudster. Absent: Donny Most as Ralph Malph; Erin Moran as Joanie Cunningham.
142	27	"Potsie Quits School"	Jerry Paris	Story by : James P. Dunne; Teleplay by : David Reo	May 15, 1979
Worried about a big upcoming exam, and not helped by his ferocious professor, Potsie dramatically quits school. Fonzie comes up with an unorthodox way of helping him, to try to persuade him to take the exam. Guest Stars: James Millhollin and Allan Rich. Note: Final appearance of Lorrie Mahaffey as Jennifer Jerome (Potsie's girlfriend). Side note: This episode features the song "Pump Your Blood," performed by Anson Williams, which would later be used as an advertising jingle for St. Joseph's Aspirin.
