= The Warden (TV series) =

1951 British TV drama series

- Genre: Period drama
- Based on: The Warden by Anthony Trollope
- Written by: Cedric Wallis
- Starring: J.H. Roberts; Thea Holme; Lockwood West; Avice Landone; David Markham
- Narrated by: Leonard Sachs
- Country of origin: United Kingdom
- Original language: English
- No. of episodes: 6 (all missing)

Production
- Producer: Campbell Logan
- Running time: 30 minutes
- Production company: BBC

Original release
- Network: BBC Television Service
- Release: 12 May – 16 June 1951

The Warden is a British television drama broadcast by the BBC in 1951 in six parts. An adaptation by Cedric Wallis of Anthony Trollope's 1855 novel The Warden, it was produced by Campbell Logan and sets were designed by Roy Oxley. Cast included J.H. Roberts, Thea Holme, Lockwood West, Avice Landone, David Markham, Arthur Hambling, Christopher Steele, Arthur Wontner, Lucille Lisle and Horace Sequiera, with Leonard Sachs as the narrator.

The series was broadcast live and is lost.
