= Rosemary Nicols =

British actress (born 1940)

- Born: Rosemary Claxton; 28 October 1940 (age 86); Bradford, England
- Occupations: Actress, writer
- Spouse: Frederic Mullally (m. 1971–2014)
- Father: Hedley Claxton

Rosemary E Mullally (née Claxton; 28 October 1940), known professionally as Rosemary Nicols, is an English actress and writer. On television, she starred as the titular character of the BBC Two serial Ann Veronica (1965) and Annabelle Hurst in the ITV cult classic series Department S (1969–1970). She comes from a theatrical family and authored the book The Loving Adventures of Jaby (1970).

== Biography ==
Rosemary E Claxton was born in Bradford and grew up on Scarlet Road in Wembley. Her father was music hall entertainer turned impresario Hedley Claxton (1899–1980). She was educated at Haberdashers' Aske's School for Girls in Acton, west London. She made appearances as a child actress, before studying at the Central School of Speech and Drama, graduating in 1961. She went into rep at Harrogate, Frinton-on-Sea and Wimbledon amongst others. Her first London lead was in Something Nasty in the Woodshed.

In films, she had roles in The Blue Lamp (1950), The Pleasure Girls (1965) and The Mini Affair (1968). On stage, she starred in the 1966 West End production Fiddler on the Roof. She played assistant vet Sheila Dicken in Badger's Bend in 1963, and played the title role in the 1964 BBC series Ann Veronica based on a novel by H. G. Wells. She appeared in numerous television series such as the sci-fi drama Undermind in 1965, and Man in a Suitcase in 1968 but her best-known role was as computer expert Annabelle Hurst in the television series Department S.

Later roles included Anna Sergeyevna in a 1971 adaptation of Ivan Turgenev's Fathers and Sons, and appearances in shows like The Persuaders!, General Hospital and The Cedar Tree. Nicols had a folk music programme on TV before quitting acting.

Nicols married writer Frederic Mullally in 1971 and moved to Malta to concentrate on writing. She completed an astrology diploma at London's Faculty of Astrological Studies in 1974.

Nicolas contributed to the 2008 documentary Wanna Watch a Television Series?.

== Filmography ==
=== Film ===
Year	Title	Role	Note
1950	The Blue Lamp	Cockney Urchin Girl	
1965	The Pleasure Girls	Marion	
1967	Brown Eye, Evil Eye	Mrs. Wilson	
1967	The Mini-Affair	Charlotte	

=== Television ===
Year	Title	Role	Notes
1963	Badger's Bend	Sheila Dicken	
1963	Armchair Theatre	Jean	Episode: "A Way of Living"
1964	Detective	Mary Hume	Episode: "The Jesus Window"
1964	Ann Veronica	Ann Veronica	Miniseries
1964	No Hiding Place	Mary Tovey	Episode: "Trained to Kill"
1964	Love Story	Sally	Episode: "The Truth Game"
1965	Hugh and I		Episode: "The Critics"
1965	Undermind	Anne Heriot	
1966	The Likely Lads	Sally West	Episode: "Anchors Aweigh"
1967	Man in a Suitcase	Moira	Episode: "Day of Execution"
1969–1970	Department S	Annabelle Hurst	
1970	The Wednesday Play	Nita/Betty	2 episodes
1971	The Persuaders!	Melanie Sadler	Episode: "Greensleeves"
1977	General Hospital	Dr. Sara Lacey	5 episodes
1978	The Cedar Tree	Angela Scott	
