= Joseph Parry (disambiguation) =

Joseph Parry (1841–1903) was a Welsh composer and musician.

Joseph Parry may also refer to:

- Joseph Parry (artist) (1756–1826), British painter and engraver
- Joseph Parry (politician), politician

== See also ==
- Joseph Parry's Cottage, birthplace of the Welsh composer Joseph Parry
