= The Life and Times of David Lloyd George =

BBC Wales drama serial

- Genre: Historical drama
- Written by: Elaine Morgan
- Directed by: John Hefin (uncredited)
- Starring: Philip Madoc; Lisabeth Miles; William Thomas; Rachel Thomas
- Composers: Ennio Morricone (theme); Kenyon Emrys-Roberts (original music)
- Country of origin: United Kingdom
- Original language: English
- No. of episodes: 9

Production
- Producer: John Hefin
- Camera setup: Multi-camera video (studio); Film and OB video (locations)
- Running time: 60 minutes (episodes 1-8), 70 minutes (episode 9)

Original release
- Network: BBC Two
- Release: 4 March – 29 April 1981

The Life and Times of David Lloyd George is a BBC Wales drama serial first broadcast in 1981 on BBC Two. It stars Philip Madoc as David Lloyd George, the final Liberal prime minister of the UK. The cast also includes Lisabeth Miles, Kika Markham and David Markham. It was written by Elaine Morgan and produced and directed by John Hefin.

The serial is in nine hour-long episodes, covering most of the major events of Lloyd George's life, from his birth in Manchester in January 1863 until his death in 1945 in Llanystumdwy. It covers his personal life, specifically the running of two families. The duration of Lloyd George's political career, of over 54 years, combined with the length of the series, means that certain periods of history have been skirted over. This is particularly the case with the various Liberal Party splits from 1918 onwards. The historical consultant for the series was the historian A. J. P. Taylor.

The serial featured music by Ennio Morricone, including the theme music ("Chi Mai"), which was a surprise hit on the UK Singles Chart, reaching number 2. The opening titles showed an elderly Lloyd George walking through the Welsh countryside near Criccieth remembering his Uncle Lloyd baptising the young David George (later Lloyd George) in a mountain stream.

== Cast ==
- Philip Madoc - David Lloyd George
- Dylan Jones - David Lloyd George (as a boy)
- Euros Jones - William George (as a boy)
- Lisabeth Miles - Margaret Lloyd George
- William Thomas - William George
- Kika Markham - Frances Stevenson
- William Hootkins - Winston Churchill
- Meredith Edwards - Richard Lloyd
- David Markham - Herbert Henry Asquith
- Sue Jones-Davies - Megan Lloyd George
- Gillian Elisa - Anita George
- Ietsyn Garlick - Richard Lloyd George
- Elen Roger Jones - Sara
- Lisa Grug - Megan Lloyd George (older age)
- Denys Hawthorne - John Dillon
- Hugh Morton - Reginald McKenna
- Jonathan Elsom - Maurice Hankey
- Ioan Meredith - J. T. Davies
- Berly Williams - Betsy George
- Rachel Thomas - Mrs. Richard Owen
- Jack Wynne-Williams - Richard Lloyd George
- John Gill - Lord Curzon
- Anthony Sharp - Lord Grey
- Ed Devereaux - Max Aitken (later Lord Beaverbrook)
- Fulton Mackay - Andrew Bonar Law
- Michael Anthony - Georges Clemenceau
- Michael Cochrane - Charles Masterman
- Dermot Tuohy - John Redmond
- John Boxer - Murray of Elibank
- John H. Francis - Gwilym Lloyd George
- David Troughton - A. J. Sylvester
- Ruth Madoc - Lizzie Davies
- Glyn Williams - Returning officer
- Donna Edwards - Mair Lloyd George
- Kevin Flood - Edward Carson
- Ray Smith - Aneurin Bevan
- Paul Curran - Stanley Baldwin
- Lockwood West - Edward VII
- Roland Culver - William Ewart Gladstone
- Wendy Williams - Emmeline Pankhurst
- David Lyn - Sam Evans
- Richard Beale - Lord Kitchener
- Terence Brook - George V
- Shane Connaughton - Éamon de Valera
- Morris Perry - Lord Birkenhead
- Gabriel Connaughton - Michael Collins
- Desmond Llewelyn - Lord Lansdowne
- Angus MacKay - Sir Francis Hopwood
- Jack May - Lord Runciman
- David Garfield - Tom Bell
- Edward Judd - LNER Director
- Ray Handy - Reverend Ellis
- Gilbert Wynne - Tim Davies
- William Squire - Dr. Clifford
- Roger Nott - Aide

== Episodes ==
The series was first broadcast on BBC Two in 1981 and was repeated on BBC One in 1983.
Episodes 1 to 8 are approximately 60 minutes long, and episode 9 is approximately 70 minutes long.

| Episode | Title | First Broadcast | Synopsis |
|---|---|---|---|
| 1 | Don't Try, Do It... | Wednesday 4 March 1981, 9.25pm | David Lloyd George's career as a lawyer takes a fateful turn when he marries. |
| 2 | A Wicked War | Wednesday 11 March 1981, 9.25pm | Lloyd George makes a barnstorming start as an MP, but his private life becomes complicated. |
| 3 | He Is Wise And Merciful | Wednesday 18 March 1981, 9.25pm | A family tragedy leaves Lloyd George, now a cabinet minister, distraught. |
| 4 | All Flesh And Grass | Wednesday 25 March 1981, 9.25pm | Lloyd George gets close to his daughter's new governess. |
| 5 | Well, We're In | Wednesday 1 April 1981, 9.25pm | With Europe descending quickly into war, Lloyd George battles to provide enough arms. |
| 6 | Number Ten | Wednesday 8 April 1981, 9.25pm | Lloyd George becomes Prime Minister, determined to banish defeatism and shake up decision-making. |
| 7 | An Honourable Peace | Wednesday 15 April 1981, 9.25pm | Amid the victory celebrations, Frances learns a harsh truth. |
| 8 | Win Or Lose | Wednesday 22 April 1981, 9.25pm | At Versailles, Lloyd George argues against punitive treatment for Germany. |
| 9 | Footnotes of History | Wednesday 29 April 1981, 9.25pm | Lloyd George finds he can no longer split his time between the two women in his life. |
