= David Lyn =

Welsh television, film, stage actor and director (1927–2012)

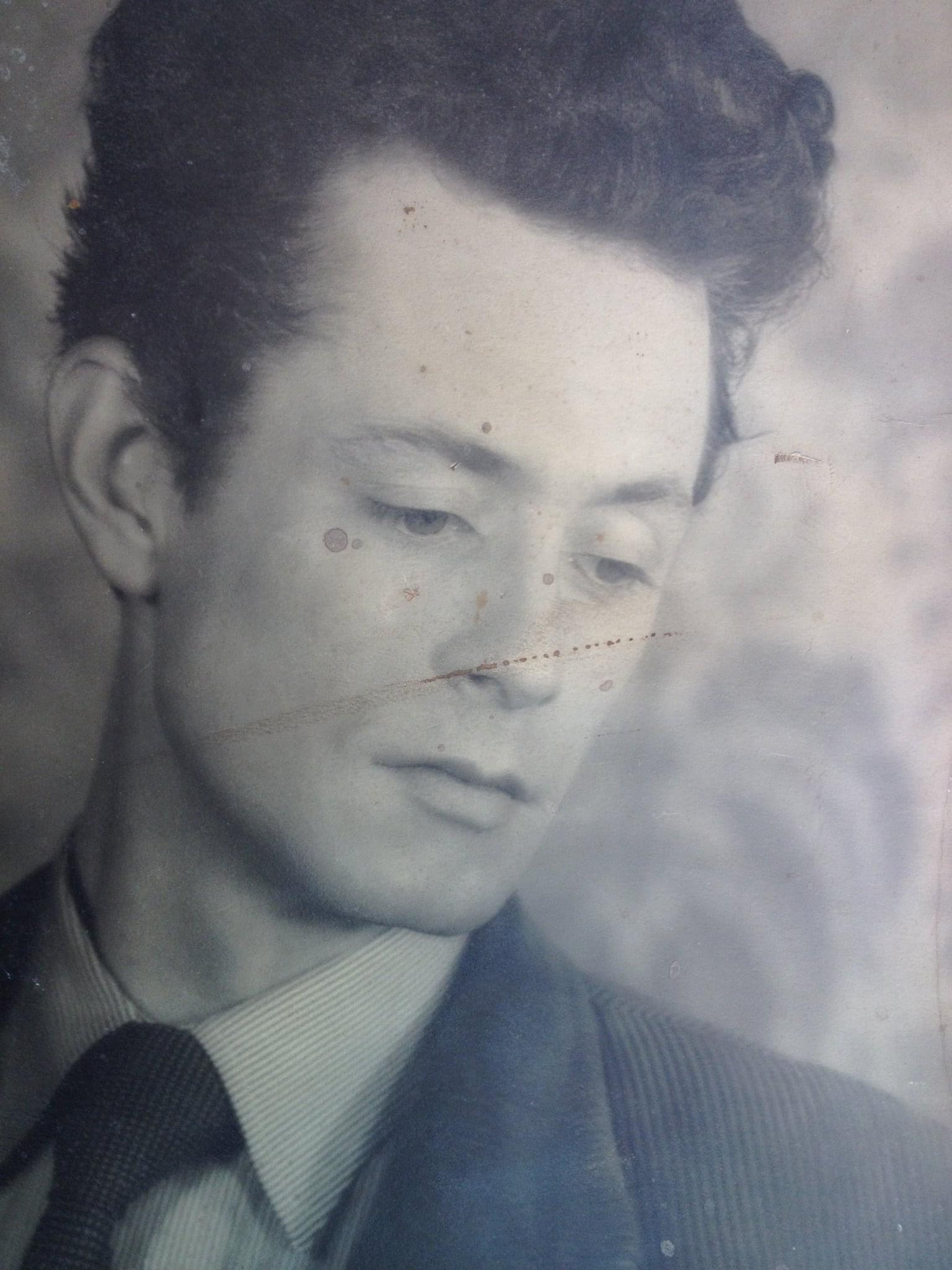
- Lyn in 1965
- Born: David Lyn Jenkins; 30 April 1927; Porth, Rhondda Cynon Taf, Wales
- Died: 4 August 2012 (aged 85); University Hospital of Wales, Cardiff, Wales
- Resting place: St Ystyffan, Llansteffan, Carmarthenshire, Wales
- Education: Trinity University College
- Occupation: Actor
- Years active: 1958–2012
- Notable work: Off to Philadelphia in the Morning
- Spouses: Faith Owen (m. 1950; div. 1965); Sally Pepper (m. 1965; died 2011)
- Children: 5

David Lyn Jenkins (30 April 1927 – 4 August 2012), known professionally as David Lyn, was a Welsh television, film and stage actor and director who in his 40-year career was at the forefront in the development of professional Welsh language theatre in Wales in the 1960s and 70s and won a BAFTA Cymru.

== Early life ==
David Lyn Jenkins was born on 30 April 1927 in Porth, Rhondda Cynon Taf, one of three children and the only son of Violet Margaret née Evans (1904–1992) and David Jenkins (1896–), Theirs was an English-speaking family, although the children picked up the rudiments of the Welsh language. Lyn was raised on a smallholding in Cynwyl Elfed in Carmarthenshire, an area steeped in poverty, and his own early family life was one of struggle; after winning a place at the local grammar school he went on to attend the teacher-training course at Trinity College, Carmarthen. He later joined a weekend drama course where a tutor from the Royal Academy of Music (RAM) recognised his dramatic gifts and persuaded him to move to London to study. Lyn spent two years at the RAM and decided to take a career as an actor, making his début in experimental theatre clubs such as the Watergate Theatre, where the actors would on occasion improvise and where directors were not afraid to take risks.

== Career ==
=== Early career ===
In 1964 Lyn acted in The Wars of the Roses, the Royal Shakespeare Company's production of Shakespeare's Henry VI trilogy (1 Henry VI, 2 Henry VI, 3 Henry VI) and Richard III - the four plays having been conflated into a trilogy. The production was filmed by the BBC and shown on television in 1965. Also in the RSC's 1964 season Lyn appeared in Edward IV, Richard II, played the Earl of Cambridge in Henry V and the Doctor in Henry IV, Part 1 and Henry IV, Part 2.

=== Theatre in Wales ===
Lyn took the step of leaving London to try his hand at acting in his native Wales. Throughout this period alongside his acting Lyn also developed a side-line in renovating houses and when he moved his family to North Wales he bought five derelict cottages and knocked them through into one long house, fitting a large church window in the front of the last cottage giving the building the appearance of an old chapel. In 1965 Lyn toured Ireland in a production of Pinter's The Caretaker with the Welsh Theatre Company. In 1966 he joined Cwmni Theatr Cymru, the Welsh-language wing of the Welsh Theatre Company, in the Absurdist Saer Doliau (Doll Mender or Doll Doctor), a play by the Welsh playwright Gwenlyn Parry. In 1972 Lyn purchased a 55 ft 50 ton Norwegian trawler, the Tolga, which he intended to renovate to fulfil a promise to his father to take him up the Zambezi. He and his family worked on making the trawler seaworthy.

As a boy Lyn had gained only a smattering of the Welsh language, and during this period he worked hard at the script to get his Welsh up to the standard necessary for him to be able to deliver the long speeches fluently. In this he was supported by his fellow cast members who made allowances for him at rehearsals. Over the ensuing years Lyn improved his knowledge of Welsh to such an extent that eventually he was able to act in and direct plays for Cwmni Theatr Cymru fluently in that language; among the plays he directed were: Pethe Brau (1972), a Welsh language version of The Glass Menagerie by Tennessee Williams; Esther by Saunders Lewis (1973) and Y Twr (1978) by Gwenlyn Parry.

Lyn became both impatient with the attitude of some of the older members of the drama committee of the Welsh Arts Council who expressed the hope that internationally acclaimed Welsh actors might be persuaded to return to perform in Wales, as well with the Welsh Theatre Company which produced plays with English actors and Welsh actors who lived and mainly worked in England but who acted in Wales only when they couldn't find work in England.

Lyn as Joseph Parry in Off to Philadelphia in the Morning (BBC, 1978)

To promote a professionalism in Welsh theatre Lyn founded a Welsh Actors' Society, of which he wrote in 1977, "Whenever it spoke it almost frightened itself to death. It eventually made itself articulate on some important union matters after it had converted itself into the Welsh Committee of Equity. On theatre policy it was quite without courage." In the 1960s he was at the forefront of a group of Welsh actors who worked towards founding a National Theatre in Wales. Lyn almost succeeded in this aim when in 1966 he was among those who founded Theatr yr Ymylon, a bilingual touring theatre company based in Bangor which it was intended would grow into a national theatre for Wales. Lyn was the artistic director but the company folded in 1978 as the result of in-fighting over what constituted a "national theatre". Lyn returned to acting in television, most notably playing Joseph Parry in Off to Philadelphia in the Morning (1978) for the BBC.

By now disillusioned with the theatre scene in Wales he and his family sailed their trawler the Tolga from Barry to St Katharine Docks by Tower Bridge. Lyn turned his back on acting, preferring to work in London as a taxi driver while his wife Sally worked as a picture editor on Newsnight, with the couple living on the boat in the wheel house. In 1982 with the advent of S4C the two returned to Wales where Lyn learned how to direct for television and film. The Tolga sank in a dock in Wapping and later was raised and taken to a dock on the Thames where eventually she was scuttled. In 1984 Lyn founded Penadur, his television and film company.

== Later years ==
Lyn produced plays for Theatr Powys and also produced and directed dramas for the stage and television, sometimes with Hannah and Tim Lyn, two of his five children. For Welsh television Lyn directed a 1993 adaptation of the novel Traed mewn cyffion and various other series and dramas. In 1994 Lyn purchased Pilroath, a rundown mansion in Llangain in Carmarthenshire which had large outbuildings in which he built studios and back stage areas. Here he based Penadur, which produced the acclaimed Welsh-language series Pris y Farchnad (1995) about auctioneers in Carmarthen and which won him a BAFTA Cymru award.

Lyn's television company Penadur was doing well until Huw Jones, the new chief executive of S4C who had been appointed in 1994, had the idea to create large production companies, created from the amalgamation of smaller companies. Lyn was not in favour of this move, arguing that it would create a 'jobs for the boys' environment that would impact on truly Welsh programme making. He was concerned that S4C would produce bi-lingual carbon-copies of television programmes from other countries instead of producing original Welsh dramas. He was also concerned that, as in the 1970s, actors and television makers would come to work in Wales only for their own personal gain - at the expense of home-grown talent.

After the changes at S4C Penadur did not get any more work which resulted in the company folding in January 1999 following which Lyn returned to renovating old houses. He sold Pilroath, the family home with its outbuildings and used the money to support himself and his wife, with the two moving into one of the outbuildings. His career as a pioneer and campaigner for Welsh-language drama and theatre was largely forgotten. His son Tim Lyn directed him in the 2001 S4C television drama series Fondue Rhyw a Dinasors (Fondue, Sex and Dinosaurs) which followed the plight of six people in their thirties living in the fictional rural Welsh village of Llaneden and in which he played John Prosser.

== Personal life ==
Lyn lived in London for 15 years married to Faith Owen in 1950, and with whom he had a son, Adam. He married again in 1965 to Sally Pepper (1937–2011), with whom he had four children: Sian, Timothy, Bronwen and Hannah Lyn. David had 13 grandchildren and was fondly known as Papa.

== Ill health and death ==
David Lyn was diagnosed with early onset dementia.

Lyn later died at the University Hospital of Wales in Cardiff in August 2012 aged 85. His funeral service was held at St Ystyffan's Church in Llansteffan in Carmarthenshire where he was buried in the churchyard with his late wife.

He lived to see the founding of Theatr Genedlaethol Cymru, the Welsh language national theatre of Wales, founded in 2003, and its counterpart in National Theatre Wales, the English language national theatre company of Wales, founded in 2009. Together the two theatre companies provide a national platform for professional drama in Wales.

== Television and film credits ==
Title	Year	Role
Murder Bag (1958)	1958	P.C. Thomas/Police photographer/Maroso
Saturday Playhouse	1959	Gwyn Davies
The Vagrant Heart	1959	Vicar
Garry Halliday	1959-1960	Sergeant/French Inspector/Sergeant Schlumpieter
How Green Was My Valley	1960	Ivor Morgan
Scotland Yard	1960	Detective Sergeant Turner
St. Ives	1960	Dubois
The Citadel	1960	Mr Griffiths
The House Under the Water	1961	Charles Lingen
Dixon of Dock Green (1957–1961)	1957-1961	PC Jenkins/Godfather
Walk a Crooked Mile	1961	Fingerprint Man
Z-Cars	1963	Edwards
ITV Play of the Week	1964	Eynon
The Wars of the Roses	1965	Unnamed roles
Centre Play	1974	Derryk
Pobol y Cwm	1975–1976, 1981–1982	Colin Griffiths
Off to Philadelphia in the Morning	1978	Joseph Parry
The Life and Times of David Lloyd George	1981	Sam Evans
Coming Home	1981	Headmaster
Ennal's Point	1982	Geoffrey Hannah
Owain Glendower, Prince of Wales	1983	King Henry IV
The Magnificent Evans	1984	Preacher
Cold Warrior	1984	Sir Robert Constable
Yr Alcoholig Llon	1984	Maestro
Eh Brian! It's a Whopper	1984	Jack
Dramarama	1987	Wallace Burke
Bloody New Year	1987	Interviewer
A Mind to Kill	1997	Sir Isaac Gwillym
