= Wyn Jones =

Wyn Jones may refer to:

- Wyn Jones (colonial administrator) (1926–1993), British colonial administrator
- Wyn Jones (police officer) (born c. 1943), British police officer, Assistant Commissioner of the Metropolitan Police
- Wyn Jones (rugby union) (born 1992), Welsh rugby union player

== See also ==
- Alun Wyn Jones (born 1985), Welsh rugby union player
- David Wyn Jones (born 1950), British musicologist
- Enid Wyn Jones (1909–1967), Welsh nurse
- Ieuan Wyn Jones (born 1949), Welsh politician
- Richard Wyn Jones (born 1966), Welsh political scientist
