= Welsh Theatre Company =

The Welsh Theatre Company was a professional theatrical company that performed in English in Wales. The Welsh language section of the company was Cwmni Theatr Cymru and the two shared workshops and technical facilities until 1973.

The Welsh Theatre Company was established in 1962 in Cardiff in Wales by the Welsh Arts Council; its first director was Warren Jenkins. The majority of the company's productions were performed in English. The company received some criticism for producing plays with English actors and Welsh actors who lived and mainly worked in England but who acted in Wales only when they couldn't find work in England instead of employing Welsh actors who were based in their native land. The company's touring productions included Molière's The Miser (1962); A Man for All Seasons (1962) with Philip Madoc as Thomas Cromwell; Period of Adjustment (1963) by Tennessee Williams; Jackie The Jumper (1965), Hamlet (1969) with Angharad Rees as Ophelia and House of Cowards by Dannie Abse. In 1970 the company intended to make the Prince of Wales Theatre, Cardiff its base, but the plan was abandoned.

== Cwmni Theatr Cymru ==
Wilbert Lloyd Roberts, Head of Drama at the BBC in Cardiff, had directed Welsh language productions with a troupe of Welsh actors who worked for both the BBC and the Welsh Theatre Company. Roberts left the BBC to become director of the Welsh language section of the Welsh Theatre Company - Cwmni Theatr Cymru. Founded and based in 1968 in Bangor in Caernarfonshire, Cwmni Theatr Cymru was a touring theatre company which performed in small venues such as school and village halls in the towns of Wales. Its management committee included Dr Thomas Parry, Alun Llywelyn-Williams and Helen Ramage while the Marquess of Anglesey was the honorary president. In 1966 the company toured the Absurdist Saer Doliau (Doll Mender or Doll Doctor), a play by the Welsh playwright Gwenlyn Parry with a cast that included David Lyn. In 1972 the company toured in a Welsh language version of Molière's Le malade imaginaire which toured Wales and played at the Liverpool Playhouse. The company toured in Pethe Brau (1972), a Welsh language version of The Glass Menagerie by Tennessee Williams, in Esther by Saunders Lewis and Y Twr by Gwenlyn Parry, all three productions directed by David Lyn. The Welsh actress and teacher Elen Roger Jones performed with the company in the early 1970s.

In 1973 Cwmni Theatr Cymru obtained a disused chapel in Bangor for use as its technical base making it independent from its parent company. It was the only fully professional Welsh language theatre company in Wales and it toured plays to all parts of Wales where Welsh was spoken. From 1975 the company was based in Theatr Gwynedd in Bangor and was managed by members of both the theatre and the theatre company. When a group of young Welsh-speaking actors wanted to produce more experimental plays Cwmni Theatr Cymru founded 'Adran Antur'. Cwmni Theatr Cymru also formed Cymdeithas Theatr Cymru (The Welsh Theatre Society) which was designed to publicise Welsh theatre through local representatives and committees. Cwmni Theatr Cymru closed in 1984 owing to financial problems.

A collection of Cwmni Theatr Cymru programmes and posters are held in the archive of Bangor University while the company's archive is held by the National Library of Wales.
