= Albert Sylvester =

Albert Sylvester may refer to:

- Albert Hale Sylvester (1871–1944), surveyor, explorer, and forest supervisor in the U.S. state of Washington
- A. J. Sylvester (Albert James Sylvester, 1889–1989), Principal Private Secretary to British politician David Lloyd George
