= Off to Philadelphia in the Morning (TV series) =

British television series

The opening titles for Off to Philadelphia in the Morning ( BBC, 1978)

Off to Philadelphia in the Morning is a 1978 BBC three-part television drama series based on the book of the same name by Jack Jones to a screenplay by Elaine Morgan. It is a fictionalised account of the life of the Welsh composer and academic Joseph Parry.

The series of three 50 minute episodes was made by BBC Cymru Wales and produced and directed by John Hefin. The cast primarily featured Welsh actors while Gareth Ridgewell Whiley (born 1967), who played Joseph Parry as a boy, was living in Merthyr Tydfil in Wales where he was attending school.

== Synopsis ==
=== Part 1 ===
Life in the fearsome industrial coal and iron town of Merthyr Tydfil is harsh and dangerous and in the iron works Dick Llewellyn is blinded and disfigured in a splash of molten metal. Young Joseph is inspired when he hears a brass band playing at Cyfarthfa Castle. Daniel Parry dreams of escaping the rigours of his life to a new life in the United States, but his wife does not want to go.

=== Part 2 ===
Having persuaded his wife, Daniel Parry and his family have settled in America, but young Joseph Parry's ambitious wife Jane urges him to seek musical fame in London where during a performance of Rigoletto he encounters his old boyhood friend Myfanwy Llewellyn, who now calls herself Lina Van Elyn.

=== Part 3 ===
Joseph Parry collapses near the end of a long and strenuous tour of conducting his works in the United States. As his wife becomes more difficult and demanding Parry's thoughts increasingly turn to his childhood sweetheart, Myfanwy Llewellyn. In London he ignores the advice of Sir William Sterndale Bennett and returns to Wales as Professor of Music at Aberystwyth. Parry clashes with the Principal, and the newly-founded University College Wales, Aberystwyth, wonders what it has let itself in for.

== Cast ==
- Gerald James ... Mr. Thomas (Ieuan Ddu)
- William Squire ... Daniel Parry
- Rachel Thomas ... Betty Parry
- Connie Booth ... Jane Parry
- Donna Edwards ... Myfanwy Llewellyn
- Dafydd Hywel ... Henry Parry
- Delme Bryn-Jones ... Dick Llewellyn
- David Lyn ... Joseph Parry
- David Markham ... Sir William Sterndale Bennett
- Gaynor Morgan Rees ... Anne Parry
- Dewi Morris ... Robbie Jones
- Siân Phillips ... Lina Van Elyn
- Gareth Ridgewell Whiley ... young Joseph Parry
- Dennis Burgess ... Sir William Crawley
- Meredith Edwards ... Principal Thomas Charles Edwards
- Michael Forrest ... Sergeant
- Geraint Jarman ... Student
- Fidelma Murphy ... Cathy Llewellyn
- Dillwyn Owen ... Professor Jones

== Locations ==
Among the filming locations were: the Thames Embankment; Cyfarthfa Castle in Merthyr Tydfil; Constitution Hill, Aberystwyth; the Old College, Aberystwyth and the seafront at Aberystwyth.

== See also ==
- List of Welsh television series
