= Elvis Rock =

Graffiti in Wales

Coordinates: 52.4409°N 3.7654°W

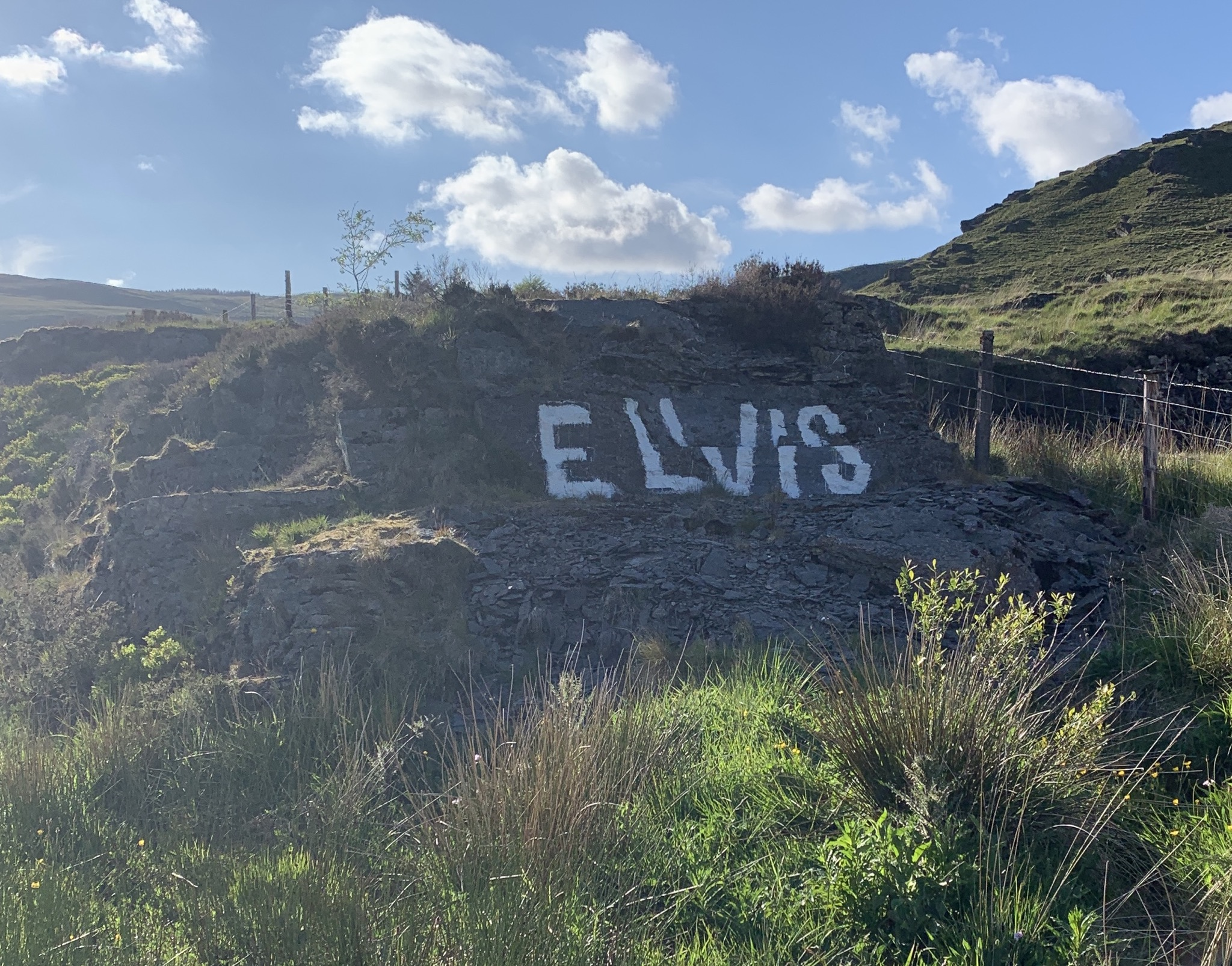
The 'Elvis Rock' beside the A44 road in mid Wales

The Elvis Rock is a rock alongside the A44 in Powys, Wales, near its border with Ceredigion. It is one of the most well-known pieces of graffiti in Wales, with the word "ELVIS" written on it. The rock is located beside the main trunk road through the country and appears out of context with the surrounding landscape.

== History ==
The graffiti on the rock allegedly originally read “Ellis” and was written in 1962 by John Hefin and David Meredith in support of a local Plaid Cymru candidate, Islwyn Ffowc Elis, but was misspelt. The rock has been repainted several times; at one point, the text was obliterated. However, the word "Elvis" later reappeared on the rock and is still visible today.
