= Heaven on Earth (1987 film) =

British and Canadian television film

- Genre: Drama
- Written by: Margaret Atwood; Peter Pearson
- Directed by: Allan Kroeker
- Starring: Torquil Campbell; Sarah Polley; Fiona Reid; R. H. Thomson
- Countries of origin: Canada; United Kingdom
- Original language: English

Production
- Producer: W. Paterson Ferns
- Cinematography: Rodney Charters
- Editor: Lara Mazur
- Running time: 100 minutes
- Production company: Opix Films

Original release
- Network: BBC; CBC Television
- Release: March 1, 1987

Heaven on Earth is a British and Canadian dramatic television film, directed by Allan Kroeker and released in 1987. A coproduction of the BBC and CBC Television, the film centres on a group of orphaned children from the United Kingdom who are sent to Canada as Home Children in the 1910s.

The film's screenplay was written by Margaret Atwood and Peter Pearson. However, Atwood was critical of the finished product, as Kroeker and Nancy Botkin inserted a sexual assault scene she had not written and did not endorse as it did not fit her historical research into the Home Children.

The cast included Torquil Campbell, Sarah Polley, Fiona Reid, Sian Leisa Davies, Nathan Adamson, Amos Crawley, Huw Davies, Donna Edwards, David Hughes, Alison MacLeod, Loreena McKennitt, Maureen McRae, Nicholas Rice, Judy Sinclair, Cedric Smith and R.H. Thomson.

The film was broadcast on March 1, 1987, both as an episode of the anthology series Screen Two on the BBC and as a standalone television film on the CBC. In 1988 it was broadcast in the United States as an episode of Masterpiece Theatre, the first Canadian production ever anthologized by that series.

Thomson received a Gemini Award nomination for Best Actor in a Television Film or Miniseries at the 2nd Gemini Awards.
