= Traed mewn cyffion =

Book by Kate Roberts

Traed mewn cyffion ("Feet in the stocks") is a novel by Kate Roberts, written in the Welsh language and first published in 1936.

== Plot summary ==
The action takes place in the period between 1880 and 1914 against the background of the slate quarries of north Wales, the region where the author was brought up. The main character, Jane Gruffydd, is a mother of six forced to overcome many hardships in order to bring up her family.

An adaptation of the novel for Welsh television was directed by David Lyn.
