= Grand Slam (1978 film) =

- DVD cover
- Directed by: John Hefin
- Written by: Gwenlyn Parry; John Hefin
- Produced by: John Hefin
- Starring: Hugh Griffith; Windsor Davies; Sion Probert; Dewi "Pws" Morris; Sharon Morgan
- Edited by: Chris Lawrence
- Production company: BBC Wales
- Release date: 17 March 1978
- Running time: 62 minutes
- Country: United Kingdom
- Languages: English; Welsh; French

Grand Slam is a 1978 sports comedy film produced by BBC Wales. The film starred Oscar-winning actor Hugh Griffith, Windsor Davies, Dewi "Pws" Morris and Sion Probert. The play was written for television by Gwenlyn Parry and then-head of drama for BBC Wales, John Hefin.

== Plot ==
Four men, members of a Welsh rugby union club, fly to Paris as part of a weekend outing to see Wales play France in the Five Nations Championship match that will decide the Grand Slam title.

One of the party is funeral director Caradog Lloyd-Evans, who briefly served in occupied Paris near the end of World War II. Caradog pays for his son Glyn's air ticket on the proviso that Glyn comes on a 'pilgrimage' to find his 'little butterfly' who he spent a short romantic period with during the war. This pilgrimage is successful and although the right place is found, it is no longer the innocent bistro of his youth but one of many strip club joints. Mr Lloyd-Evans mistakes a young girl in the club (who is a spitting image of his 'little butterfly') for the real thing and finds that the girl is actually Odette, the daughter of his old flame. He is (naturally) disappointed but Glyn gets himself acquainted with Odette while Caradog reminisces with his 'butterfly'.

A quick call to the hotel brings the entire tour party to the club where fun and frolicking takes place led by club secretary Mog Jones, a retired player whose dreams of playing for his country were never realised. Some locals take exception and a mass brawl starts which ends with the arrival of the police. The whole party is arrested except Caradog (protected by his 'butterfly' Madame) and Glyn (hidden in Odette's bedroom).

Sion Probert plays camp boutique owner Maldwyn Pugh, who is the only one of the main four characters who makes the start of the match, because Mog is still in jail as he was considered the ringleader (the others were released), Caradog has collapsed near his strip club table while Glyn is trying for his own sexual 'Grand Slam' with Odette, taking a rest to watch the game on TV.

Mog is eventually released halfway through the first half of the match, but when he finally arrives at the stadium, there's only seconds of the game left, which Wales lose, leaving Maldwyn without a prized signature from Gareth Edwards and Mog still yet to witness a Welsh Grand Slam triumph. Caradog is found after the match, and Madame thinks he has died, but Odette fires a soda siphon on his face, and the story ends with Caradog warning his son of the dangers of overseas travel.

== Cast ==
- Hugh Griffith as Caradog Lloyd Evans
- Windsor Davies as Mog Jones
- Sion Probert as Maldwyn Novello-Pughe
- Dewi "Pws" Morris as Glyn Lloyd-Evans
- Sharon Morgan as Odette
- Elizabeth Morgan as Josephine
- Marika Rivera as the Madame
- Dillwyn Owen as Will Posh
- Kim Karlisle as the Stripper
- Mici Plwm and Malcolm Williams as the Gendarmes
- Clive Gilvear as the big Frenchman

== Production ==
=== Writing ===
Wales' 16-9 defeat on the day of the match led to a rewrite of some of the film's closing scenes and a new scene with Mog and Maldwyn contemplating next year's Wales v France fixture at Cardiff Arms Park (which saw Wales beat France 16-7 to win the Grand Slam and the 1978 Five Nations).

=== Filming ===
Many of the film's interior scenes were filmed at the BBC Wales club in Newport Road, Cardiff with filming in Paris taking place over several days in February 1977, when Wales' match with France took place at Parc des Princes during the second round of matches in the 1977 Five Nations Championship. The airport scenes were filmed at Broadcasting House, Cardiff and Cardiff Airport.

== Release ==
Originally the film was to run for 75 minutes, but just a few days before its first network broadcast on 17 March 1978, it was ordered to be cut down to an hour as a result of industrial action (a prelude to the Winter of Discontent). The film, which remains iconic in Wales, marked the penultimate role of actor Hugh Griffith, who died in 1980.

== Legacy ==
In 2017, it was named as the greatest Welsh film of all time, praising the "great naturalistic comic performances."

== Sequel ==
In 2026, comedian and writer, Mike Bubbins announced he was teaming up with actor Steve Speirs to write a follow-up. Bubbins said: "I'm going to write a sequel that is a homage to the original. The option's been paid for."

== See also ==
- Cinema of Wales
- List of Welsh films
