= Blodwen =

Welsh-Language opera

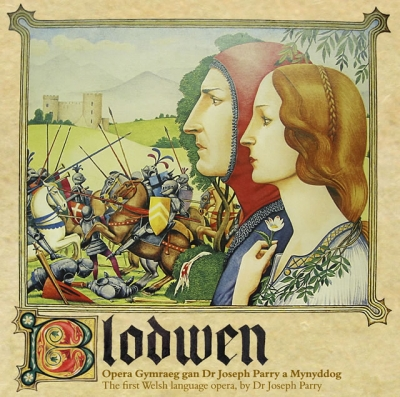
Album cover (1978)

Blodwen (Welsh pronunciation: [ˈblɔdwɛn]) is an opera in three acts composed in 1878 by Dr Joseph Parry to a libretto by Richard Davies. It was the first opera written in the Welsh language.

== Reception ==
The opera premiered on 21 May 1878 at the Temperance Hall in Aberystwyth, with Parry himself conducting.

It was well-received, with one reporter from the Welsh-language magazine Y Faner heavily praising it.

Following the first performance in Aberystwyth, Blodwen was taken on tour through the counties of Glamorgan and Monmouthshire, and was performed by the Welsh Representative Choir in Bristol and at Alexandra Palace in London. They travelled by train from Aberdare to London, and Parry wrote to the press to say that people were welcome to join the singers on the journey.

By the summer of 1879, the composer claimed that his opera had been performed approximately fifty times, and that his next aim was a grand, full-scale performance "with costumes and appropriate appearance". That occurred in Aberdare on 26 December 1879, when the work was performed by the Choral Union under the direction of Rees Evans, and with Llew Llwyfo as one of the singers.

The opera had received 500 performances by 1896.

In 1963, Qualiton published a record titled 'Blodwen, Highlights From The Opera Blodwen' performed by the Pontarddulais Choral Society, the cover image was that of Gwrych Castle.

The opera was performed at the 1978 Menai Music Festival, in a version re-orchestrated by Dulais Rhys. A CD recording of the performance was issued. In 2016 Dulais Rhys published a chamber version of the opera. In 2019, it was performed in the US.

== Synopsis ==
Apart from the last scene, which is set in Chester Castle, the action of Blodwen takes place in 14th century Wales, in and around Castell Maelor (Maelor Castle) in the north-east of the country.

=== Act 1 ===
Scene 1: The opera opens on the eve of the marriage of Elen, daughter of Lady Maelor, with the Welsh warrior Arthur, of Castell Berwyn (Berwyn Castle). News arrives that Syr (Sir) Hywel Ddu and his beautiful adopted daughter, Blodwen, will shortly be arriving. Lady Maelor sings of her pleasure that they, and others, are coming to the wedding and prays for peace and God's protection for Elen and Arthur. A chorus of servants sings of their joy as they decorate the castle walls and Elen's chamber with lilies and roses. Iolo the Bard proclaims peace on Lady Maelor and the castle and blesses Elen and Arthur. Blodwen and Hywel arrive; they sing greetings and wish good luck to Elen. Blodwen laments that her mother is dead and her father lost in battle but expresses her happiness at being able to make her home in Hywel's castle: Castell yr Wyddfa (Snowdon Castle). Lady Maelor sings of Blodwen's father's bravery and assures her that she is welcome to stay in Castell Maelor; Hywel urges her to stay because he fears war is coming and he will be away fighting. Iolo predicts that the English king's power will be overturned and that 'a morning star of better times is rising in the east'.

Scene 2: Elen's wedding celebration is interrupted by the arrival of three Plantagenet soldiers, who demand the keys of the castle in the name of King Henry of England. (Note: King Henry was often known as 'Harry' and is called Harri in the Welsh libretto.) Lady Maelor and the chorus send them away with a defiant message for their master.

=== Act 2 ===
Scene 1: At dawn in front of Castell Maelor, huntsmen sing as they leave for the chase. Iolo then appears, singing of the dreadful portents to be seen in the stars. Hywel next appears and sings of his love for Blodwen (who is out of sight) in one of best-known arias in the opera. She responds that she is in love with him and, making herself known, teases Hywel that he has not gone hunting. The following short love duet, colloquially known as 'Hywel a Blodwen', remains one of Wales's most beloved pieces of music. The huntsmen return but their joy is interrupted by a messenger from the Prince of Wales, who asks for the men of Maelor to defend their country and prepare immediately for battle with Harry's forces.

Scene 2: Inside Castell Maelor, Hywel and Arthur sing a rousing duet as they prepare for battle. Elen and Blodwen take leave of the warriors, each of them pinning a white ribbon on their lover's breast.

Scene 3: In Lady Maelor's chamber, a messenger arrives and describes the ferocity of the battle and the exceptional bravery of Hywel and Arthur. She calls on Iolo to foretell the outcome of the battle. He replies that disaster is at hand and that she should comfort and support Elen and Blodwen.

=== Act 3 ===
Scene 1: Arthur is back in Castell Maelor, mortally wounded. He sings a last farewell to Elen and the scene closes with a choral funeral procession.

Scene 2: A messenger arrives to tell Lady Maelor of the defeat of the Welsh army and the death of many of its leaders. Hywel was one of the bravest warriors but the messenger does not know whether he is still alive. Blodwen then calls on 'heaven's breezes' to bring her news and sings of the loss of her parents, brother and now possibly of Hywel. Iolo then arrives, bringing the news that Hywel has been captured and is in Chester Castle awaiting execution.

Scene 3: The final scene takes place in Chester Castle jail, where the Welsh prisoners sing a defiant chorus. Lady Maelor, Blodwen and Iolo have been allowed into Hywel's cell to see him for the last time. Hywel sings a song of farewell to Blodwen, an aria that remains a favorite with Welsh tenors to this day. A crowd outside the castle walls is heard celebrating the English victory. A stranger appears at the cell door and Iolo demands that he reveals his identity. The stranger is none other than Rhys Gwyn, Blodwen's father, thought to have been killed twenty years before. Father and daughter reunite as Rhys Gwyn announces good news: the King is dead and, as a consequence, he has been released from captivity and brings a command from the court that all prisoners are to be set free. The opera closes with a chorus of rejoicing, during which Parry weaves into his music the well-known traditional march 'Men of Harlech'.
