= Delme Bryn-Jones =

Welsh opera singer (1934–2001)

Delme Bryn-Jones (né Delme Jones; 29 March 1934 – 25 May 2001) was a Welsh baritone.

== Biography ==
One of five siblings, a son of bootmaker William John Jones, Bryn-Jones was born Delme Jones in Brynamman, South Wales in 1934. He was schooled at Brynamman Primary School and later at Ammanford Technical College.

Originally a coal miner, he abandoned his work, as well as the prospect of a potential rugby career, when he was an under-21 international, to study music. He was a promising under 21s rugby player, being capped for wales before he moved on to studying music. He studied under Redvers Llewellyn and then at the Guildhall School of Music and Drama from where he went on to the Vienna Music Academy. As a professional singer he took the stage name "Delme Bryn-Jones" ("Bryn from his birthplace). He made his professional stage debut in 1959 at Sadler's Wells Theatre.

Bryn-Jones' journey to the great opera houses of the world was not a conventional one, for it coincided with the golden age of Welsh opera. His débuts with the major opera companies were as follows: Début with New Opera Company in 1959 (Maconchy's The Sofa). He sang Macbeth opposite Gwyneth Jones for the Welsh National Opera in 1963 while also making his Glyndebourne début as Nick Shadow in The Rake's Progress. He also made his Covent Garden début in 1963 who engaged him again in 1965 to sing Paolo opposite Tito Gobbi's Boccanegra and a year later he sang Marcello in Puccini's La Bohème. His American début was in 1967 at the San Francisco Opera as Lescaut in Manon and Donner in Das Rheingold. The Vienna State Opera heard him first in 1969 as Renato in Verdi's Un ballo in maschera.

He privately battled alcoholism. In his final years, he became President of the Rushmoor Oddfellows Male Voice Choir from Aldershot in Hampshire, and in 2000 enjoyed great critical acclaim for a series of masterclasses and radio recitals in Canada. Jones' television and radio appearances run into many hundreds and include several TV series of his own, such as Y Gelli Aur (The Golden Grove; BBC Wales) and Delme (S4C). He also acted, appearing as Captain Cat in Under Milk Wood, and as Blind Dick Llewellyn in the BBC production of Jack Jones's Off to Philadelphia in the Morning.

== Selected roles ==
- Beethoven – Fidelio (Don Pizarro)
- Berlioz – La Damnation de Faust (Méphistophélès)
- Bizet – Les pêcheurs de perles (Zurga)
- Britten – A Midsummer Night's Dream (Demetrios)
- Cilea – Adriana Lecouvreur (Michonnet)
- Donizetti – Don Pasquale (Malatesta)
- Giordano – Andrea Chénier (Gerard)
- Gluck – Alceste (Hercule)
- Mascagni – Cavalleria rusticana (Alfio)
- Mozart – Così fan tutte (Guglielmo)
- Mozart – Le nozze di Figaro (Almaviva)
- Mozart – Die Zauberflöte (Papageno, speaker)
- Puccini – Madama Butterfly (Sharpless)
- Puccini – Il tabarro (Michele)
- Verdi – Aida (Amonasro)
- Verdi – Falstaff (Ford)
- Verdi – Otello (Iago)
- Verdi – Rigoletto (title role)
- Verdi – La traviata (Giorgio Germont)
- Verdi - Nabucco (title Role)
- Weber – Abu Hassan (Omar)
