= Tir Newydd =

Tir Newydd (English: new land) was a Welsh-language quarterly literary magazine containing cultural essays, book reviews, short stories, poems and political comment. It also includes publisher's advertisements. It was published between 1935 and 1939 by Hugh Evans a’i Feibion, Gwasg y Brython, Liverpool; it was edited by Alun Llywelyn-Williams.

It has been digitised by the Welsh Journals Online project at the National Library of Wales.
