= Donna Edwards (actress) =

Welsh actress (born 1963)

- Born: Donna Edwards; 1963 (age 62–63); Merthyr Tydfil, Wales
- Occupation: Actress
- Years active: 1978–present
- Notable work: Dinas; Belonging; Pobol y Cwm Stella
- Spouse: Ray Borja
- Children: 2

Donna Edwards (born 1963) is a Welsh actress. Edwards is a Bafta Cymru award-winning for Best Actress.

== Early life and education ==
She was born in Merthyr Tydfil and raised in the village of Trefechan. She was a pupil at Vaynor and Penderyn High School where she took an early interest in drama. At 14 she was chosen as the lead role of Myfanwy Llewellyn in Off to Philadelphia in the Morning, a 1978 BBC drama series about the composer Joseph Parry. She studied Welsh and Drama at Aberystwyth University and graduated in 1984.

== Career ==
In 1985 she was given the role of Miriam Ambrose in the Welsh-language TV drama Dinas. She has appeared in other Welsh-language productions such as Tair Chwaer and Yr Aduniad, although she may be most famous for playing Britt Monk in Pobol y Cwm.

She has also starred in a number of Welsh-based TV dramas in English such as Nuts and Bolts on ITV Wales and Belonging on BBC Wales. She has also appeared in the BBC comedy Gavin & Stacey. She has appeared in plays at the Royal Court, Clwyd Theatr Cymru and the Sherman in Cardiff.

In 2012 she played 'Mo the Bap' in the Sky1 TV comedy drama series Stella. She reprised this role for the second series. Two of her daughters have also acted, Lucy Borja who played Chloe Branagh in the first two series of Young Dracula and Sophie Borja who appeared in series four and five of The Story of Tracy Beaker as Roxy Wellard.

In 2015 she played Yvette in the National Theatre Wales production of Mother Courage at Merthyr Tydfil Labour Club.

=== Awards ===
She has won the BAFTA Cymru Best Actress Award twice – for her roles in Tair Chwaer and Belonging.

== Personal life ==
She lives in Dinas Powys, Cardiff with her husband Ray Borja, a photographer, and two children. She has two brothers twenty years her senior; John, a policeman and Ken. She is an ambassador for the learning disability charity Mencap Cymru.

== Filmography ==
=== TV ===
Year	Title	Character	Production	Notes
1978	Off to Philadelphia in the Morning	Myfanwy Llewellyn	BBC Wales	
1985–1991	Dinas	Miriam Ambrose	HTV Wales for S4C	
1987	Heaven on Earth	Sophie Payne	BBC/CBC Television	
1997–1999	Tair Chwaer	Sharon	Ffilmiau Gaucho for S4C	3 series
2000	Nuts and Bolts	Andrea Griffiths	ITV Wales	
2002–	Pobol y Cwm	Britt Monk	BBC Wales for S4C	
2003–2009	Belonging	Ruth	BBC Wales	7 series
2008	Gavin & Stacey	Sian (midwife)	BBC Three	Episodes 2.3 and 2.7
2012–2013	Stella	Mo the Bap	Sky 1	Series 1 and 2

=== Film ===
Year	Title	Character	Production	Notes
1992	Rebecca's Daughters	Bessy		
1997	House of America	Receptionist		
1998	Yr Aduniad (The Reunion)		TV film for S4C	
1999	Cymer dy Siâr	Sharon	TV film for S4C	Film concluding the TV series Tair Chwaer
2000	Very Annie Mary	Mrs. Bevan		
