= John Hefin =

Welsh television producer and director

John Hefin MBE (born John Hefin Evans; 14 August 1941 – 19 November 2012) was a Welsh television producer and director who served as head of drama at BBC Wales. He began working for the BBC in 1960, and his career at the corporation included devising the long-running Welsh soap opera Pobol y Cwm, co-writing and directing the comedy film Grand Slam, and producing the 1981 biopic The Life and Times of David Lloyd George. He was later involved with the work of Film Cymru, the Film Commission Wales, and the media journal Cyfrwng. He also worked in the Department of Theatre, Film and Television Studies at Aberystwyth University. He died from cancer in November 2012.

== Early life ==
Hefin was born in Aberystwyth in 1941, the youngest son of Huw Evans, the headmaster of a local primary school. Educated at Ardwyn Grammar School, he trained as a teacher at Trinity College, Carmarthen. He also became involved in amateur dramatics, as his parents had been.

In 1962, he was one of two people responsible for painting the graffito "Elis" on a prominent roadside rock in mid Wales, in support of a local Plaid Cymru electoral candidate. The wording was later changed from Elis to Elvis, and it became known as the Elvis Rock.

== Career ==
Hefin first became involved in television work in 1960, when he responded to a newspaper advertisement for apprentice production assistants. During the 1960s, he worked as a producer and director for BBC Wales. In 1974, he helped create the Welsh language soap opera Pobol y Cwm, the longest-running television soap opera produced by the BBC. He also co-wrote and directed the 1978 TV rugby comedy film Grand Slam, and produced the 1981 drama series The Life and Times of David Lloyd George. This nine-part series, a biopic based on the Welsh PM, drew on conversations with Lady Olwen Carey Evans, his eldest daughter, and A J Sylvester, his personal secretary. In 1984, Hefin was the director for the narration for an animated version of Prince Charles's children's story The Old Man of Lochnagar.

Following his post as Head of Drama with BBC Wales, he worked in the Department of Theatre, Film and Television Studies at Aberystwyth University from 1996 to 2001. There, along with Elan Closs Stephens, Jamie Medhurst and Benjamin Halligan, he established a degree in Film and Television Studies (in both Welsh and English). In 1988, he became the artistic director of Film Cymru (which was later renamed the Wales Film Council), entrusted with the responsibility of commissioning films from independent Welsh producers using S4C funds. He was also Chairman of the Film Commission Wales, and Chair of Cyfrwng, a Welsh media journal and network. He retired from the BBC in 1993. In 2004, he directed and filmed part of a documentary featuring the artist Sir Kyffin Williams, Reflections in a Gondola.

== Personal life ==
Hefin was married twice. He had two children with his first marriage, to Non, and a daughter with his second wife, Elin. He died at his home in Borth, Ceredigion, from cancer on 19 November 2012.

== Awards ==
He was awarded the MBE in 2009, for "services to Welsh film and drama". In 2012, he was awarded the BAFTA Cymru Special Award for Outstanding Contribution to Television Drama. New award for Welsh language short film in honor John was announced by Carmarthen Bay Film Festival.
