= Joseph Parry's Cottage =

Grade II listed building in Merthyr Tydfil, Wales

Coordinates: 51.750485°N 3.385596°W

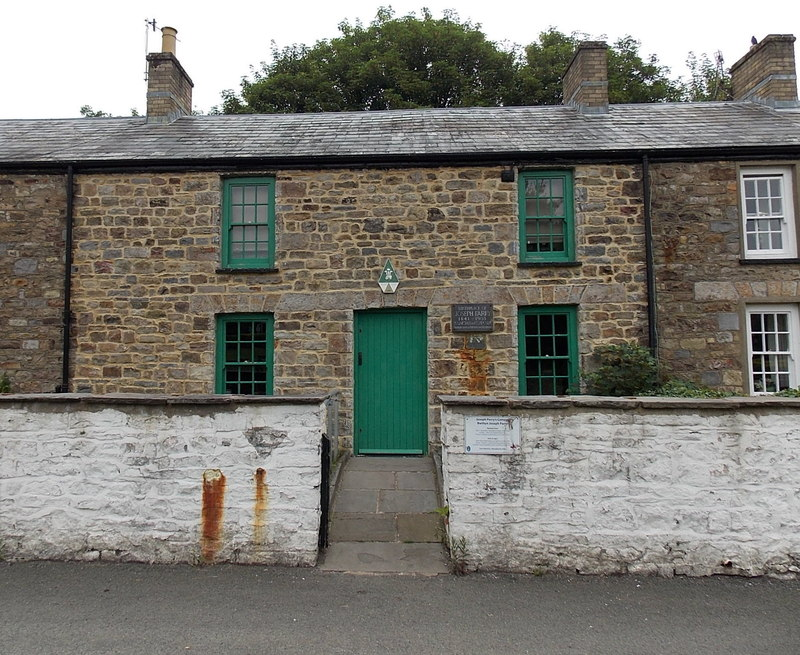
Joseph Parry's Cottage

Joseph Parry's Cottage, also known as 4 Chapel Row, is a cottage located in Merthyr Tydfil, in South Wales. Built in the early 19th century for ironworkers, the cottage is best known as the birthplace of the famous Welsh composer Joseph Parry (1841–1903). It is now open to the public as a museum.

== Location ==
The cottage is located on the north-western edge of Merthyr Tydfil, directly west of the River Taff. The Chapel Row cottages have historical links to the former Cyfarthfa Ironworks, which was a major source of local employment in the 19th century. Such was the significance of the ironworks that it attracted many from over the country, who were seeking employment at the works. As a result, the Chapel Row cottages were built in the 1820s to house the burgeoning population of local workers, particularly those employed by the industrial Crawshay family. Built specifically for skilled workers, the cottages contained features such as large outdoor spaces to allow for future expansion of the cottages.

== Structure ==
4 Chapel Row is a strong example of a skilled ironworker's’ cottage. The architectural style is consistent with prevailing construction norms of the day. The cottage is a typical two storey house located in a terraced row with exterior features such as a continuous slate roof, small pane windows and pale quoins. Much of the materials used in the construction of the cottage came from nearby areas. In the valleys above the area, located in the Brecon Beacons, many natural resources could be found such as limestone, ironstone, sandstone. These locally sourced materials were used to construct the cottages, which were then leased to Crawshay family workers.

== Features ==
Many of the interior features in the modern day cottage have been restored, and now represent a typical 19th-century Victorian cottage.

The interior also acts as a reflection of the living conditions for those who were employed at the ironworks. The first and most obvious feature of the cottage is the restored living room, which acted as the heart of Victorian households. Not only was it a living area, but it was also where domestic activities such as cooking, washing and ironing took place. Typical features of the living room include the stove, which contained a bread oven; it was this that was used for cooking, providing heat for the cottage and for heating the iron in order to perform domestic tasks. The living room also contains a dining table along with basic kitchen utensils such as a kettle and cutlery. A traditional longcase clock is also located at the centre of the room, although now out of use it was a common aesthetic in the 19th century. Also located on the ground floor is the bedroom in which Joseph Parry was born, also restored; it contains an old-fashioned wooden cradle and also a linen chest. Outdoors features included the outdoor toilet in the garden. This was a common sanitary feature of contemporary time; inevitably contributing to the spread of disease in the area.

The cottages features continued to be maintained in the modern day.

== Modern day ==
The cottage on Chapel Row is now a museum dedicated mainly to the life of Joseph Parry, but also to act as a snapshot of the living conditions in the 19th century in Merthyr Tydfil. Many of the traditional features of the cottage been restored and are now on display at the museum. The cottages on Chapel Row were reprieved from demolition in the early 1970s and were restored between 1976 and 1977. The first floor of the cottage today has been converted into a tribute of the career of Joseph Parry, with many of his photos and other documents framed for the public to view. Other items include an organ and copies of some of his compositions. The first floor also gives further background to Merthyr Tydfil's industrial past. Parry's home was recently refurbished through funds from a local company and was reopened to the public beginning on what would have been the composer's 175th birthday. The home is now part of the Cyfarthfa Heritage Area.
