= Alun Llywelyn-Williams =

Welsh writer and literary critic (1913–1988)

Alun Llywelyn-Williams (27 August 1913 – 9 May 1988), born Alun Rhun Llewelyn Williams, was a poet, critic, academic and arts administrator. He was for more than 30 years on the faculty of the University College of North Wales, Bangor. His three Welsh-language verse collections – Cerddi 1934–1942 (1944), Pont y Caniedydd (1956), and Y Golau yn y Gwyll (1979) – secured him a distinctive place in the poetry of his country as a thoughtful observer of 20th-century Welsh life in the context of the wider European experience. The novelist and scholar Gwyn Jones wrote that he "says much to men of my generation that we dearly wish we could say ourselves about the course and aftermath of wars and depressions, the changing vistas of Wales and Welsh society, the hard-held hopes and ideals that no one else can carry for us, our regrets for good things lost and ploughed-in illusions." His work can be found in The Penguin Book of Welsh Verse, The Oxford Book of Welsh Verse, and The Oxford Book of Welsh Verse in English.

== Early life ==
He was born on 27 August 1913 in Cardiff, the son of David Llewelyn Williams, a surgeon and medical administrator who became chief medical officer of the Welsh Board of Health. He had a brother, Eric, and sister, Enid. The main language spoken in the family was English, but in the sixth form of Cardiff High School for Boys he was taught Welsh by R. T. Jenkins, and went on to study Welsh and History at the University College of South Wales and Monmouthshire from 1931 to 1934, there coming under the influence of W. J. Gruffydd. After graduating he became known as a poet and as the co-founder and editor, from 1935 to 1939, of Tir Newydd (New Ground), a magazine which examined literature, the other arts and global current affairs from an urban, socialist viewpoint. He also wrote for Gruffydd's magazine Y Llenor and took jobs first with the BBC and then with the National Library of Wales. In 1940, despite misgivings about the social order he was defending, he volunteered for the Royal Welch Fusiliers, with whom he served as an officer. After the war he for two years worked for the BBC again as a radio producer.

== Academic and public life ==
In 1948 he took up the post of Director of Extra-Mural Studies at the University College of North Wales, Bangor, and in 1975 was given the title of Professor there. He retired in 1979. During these years he wrote much literary criticism, notably his 1960 volume Y Nos, Y Niwl a'r Ynys: Agweddau ar y Profiad Rhamantaidd yng Nghymru 1890-1914 [The Night, the Mist and the Island: Aspects of the Romantic Experience in Wales 1890-1914] (1960). Other critical writings were collected in Nes Na'r Hanesydd [Closer Than the Historian] (1968) and Ambell Sylw [A Few Observations] (1988). He also published two travel books, Crwydro Arfon [Wandering Arfon] (1959) and Crwydro Brycheiniog [Wandering Breconshire] (1964). One volume of his autobiography, Gwanwyn yn y Ddinas [Spring in the City], appeared in 1975.

Llywelyn-Williams took an active part in the administration of the arts in Wales. He was at various times a member of the Welsh Committees of the Arts Council and of the Independent Broadcasting Authority, a board member of Cwmni Theatr Cymru and of the Welsh Films Board, vice-president of the North Wales Arts Society and Coleg Harlech, Chair of the Welsh Academy, and co-founder of Harlech Television.

== Poetry ==
Llywelyn-Williams published three collections of poems. The first, Cerddi 1934–1942 [Poems 1934–1942] (1944) reflects on his experience of the Great Depression and the Second World War. The second, Pont y Caniedydd (1956), includes some of his best-known poems, including "Pan Oeddwn Fachgen" (When I Was a Boy), "Ar Ymweliad" (On a Visit), "Ym Merlin – 1945" (In Berlin – 1945), and the title poem, named after a bridge in Breconshire. His concerns in this volume centre on the artist's role in an increasingly barbaric world. The third, Y Golau yn y Gwyll (1979) is a collected edition of his poems including some new ones. It cemented his reputation, won the Main Poetry Prize of the Arts Council of Wales, and was translated into English by Joseph P. Clancy in 1988 under the title The Light in the Gloom.

He was in several ways very different from most Welsh-language poets of his generation, coming from a bourgeois Cardiff background and having an urban, European outlook, taking up Welsh by choice rather than as a result of his upbringing, and aligning himself with the English poets of the Auden and MacNeice school more than with his Welsh contemporaries. He felt ambivalent about the use of cynghanedd (an intricate system of alliteration used for centuries past) in modern poetry, and about the element of competition in the eisteddfod. Yet his idiom also owes obvious debts to the Romantic Welsh poets of the generation before his own: W. J. Gruffydd, T. Gwynn Jones, and R. Williams Parry. Idris Bell called him

One of the outstanding poets of [his] time...An intellectual poet, he has experimented both formally and in his treatment of ideas, and his verse in consequence is not always easy, but it repays study, revealing an honest and deeply thoughtful mind, and a vision that extends beyond the borders of Wales to wider horizons.

His poems have been translated into German, Danish, French, English, Chinese and Japanese.

== Personal life ==
In 1938 he married Alis Stocker; they had two daughters, Eryl and Luned. Ill-health during his last nine years prevented him from writing, and he died in Bangor of a heart attack on 9 May 1988.

== List of publications ==
=== In Welsh ===
- Cerddi, 1934–1942. Llundain: Gwasg Gymraeg Foyle. 1944. Poems.
- Pont y Caniedydd: Cyrfol o Fydryddiaeth. Dinbych: Gwasg Gee. 1956. Poems.
- Crwydro Arfon. Llandybie: Llyrfau'r Dryw. 1959. Travel book.
- Y Nos, y Niwl, a'r Ynys. Agweddau ar y Profiad Rhamantaidd yng Nghymru 1890-1914. Caerdydd: Gwasg Prifysgol Cymru. 1960. Literary criticism.
- Crwydro Brycheiniog. Llandybie: Llyfrau'r Dryw. 1964. Travel book.
- Y llenor a'i gymdeithas. Llundain: Y Gorfforaeth Ddarlledu Brydeinig. 1966. BBC Wales Annual Radio Lecture, 1966.
- Nes na'r Hanesydd? Ysgrifau Llenyddol. Dinbych: Gwasg Gee. 1968. Literary criticism.
- Gwanwyn yn y Ddinas: Darn o Hunangofiant. Dinbych: Gwasg Gee. 1975. ISBN 0707400821. Memoir.
- R. T. Jenkins. Cardiff: University of Wales Press. 1977. ISBN 0708306535. Critical essay.
- Y Golau yn y Gwyll: Casgliad o Gerddi. Dinbych: Gwasg Gee. 1979. ISBN 0707403081. Poems.
- Ambell Sylw. Dinbych: Gwasg Gee. 1988. ISBN 0707401542. Literary criticism.

=== English translation ===
- The Light in the Gloom: Poems and Prose. Translated by Clancy, Joseph P. Denbigh: Gee. 1998. ISBN 0707403081.
