= Building stones of Wales =

Stones used for structures in Wales

The building stones of Wales are many and varied reflecting the diverse geology of the country. Some of the earliest known use of natural stone for building purposes was the sourcing of Ordovician dolerite in the Preseli Hills for the 'bluestone' lintels of Stonehenge. Other early use was in the construction of dolmens, burial cairns and stone circles in the late Stone Age and Bronze Age. The tradition of building in stone was continued into Iron Age with the establishment of such hill forts as those at Tre'r Ceiri in North Wales and Garn Goch in the south.

The Welsh Stone Forum was established in 2003 to raise the profile of building stone in Wales.

== Lower Palaeozoic stone ==
The Lower Palaeozoic (Cambrian, Ordovician and Silurian) geological periods have each provided Wales with sources of building stone. The Cambrian Caerbwdi sandstones may be seen in St David's Cathedral whilst Ordovician slates from northern Pembrokeshire were once an important local roofing stone. The Cambrian and Ordovician slates of North Wales were once worked on a huge scale and the evidence of the former industry is considerable, especially around Llanberis, Bethesda and Blaenau Ffestiniog. Whilst most of this material was used for roofing, having excellent qualities in this respect, it was also used locally for building, for dry stone walls and slate fencing.

== Old Red Sandstone ==
The Old Red Sandstone of the Anglo-Welsh Basin comprises a variety of Devonian age sandstones (alongside other rocks unsuitable for building purposes) of different colour and texture which have been widely employed for building locally. Such towns as Brecon, Hay-on-Wye and Abergavenny owe much of their character to the chestnut brown, or occasionally green hue of these rocks. Llanthony Priory and Tintern Abbey are two notable ecclesiastical buildings constructed from different varieties of this rock. It is also found favour with the builders of Goodrich and Raglan Castles for example.

== Carboniferous Limestone ==
The Carboniferous Limestone has been used in castles at Chepstow, Pembroke and Carreg Cennen in South Wales and Penrhyn, Caernarfon, Beaumaris and Denbigh Castles in the north, amongst others. The 'Marble Church' at Bodelwyddan is built from locally sourced limestone (not marble).

== Pennant Sandstone ==
The Pennant Sandstone is widespread around the South Wales Coalfield where it has been extensively worked to provide building stone for everything from field walls, though the terrace housing typical of places like the Rhondda to edifices such as Crawshay's Cyfarthfa Castle at Merthyr Tydfil. Both Swansea and Caerphilly Castles make use of 'Pennant Blue'. Basingwerk Abbey uses a northern equivalent of the Pennant, the Cefn Sandstone.

== Triassic sandstones ==
Rocks of Triassic age are found in southern Monmouthshire and Glamorgan and some quarries have been worked here for building stone. The Quarella Stone from Bridgend has been used at Kidwelly Castle for example whilst a red conglomerate from Radyr quarries is to be found in service at Penarth docks. The Sudbrook stone, a sandy limestone, was used in the construction of Caldicot Castle in Monmouthshire and by the Romans when they constructed their forts at Caerleon and Caerwent.

== Jurassic limestone ==
The limestone of the Lias Group occurs along the south coast of Glamorgan and it has been used in vernacular building locally.

== See also ==
- Geology of Wales
- Architecture of Wales
