= Crawshay =

Crawshay is a surname. Notable people with the surname include:

- Crawshay Bailey (1789–1872), English industrialist who became one of the great iron-masters of Wales
- David Crawshay (born 1979), Australian rower
- Eliot Crawshay-Williams (1879–1962), British author, officer, and Liberal Party politician
- Geoffrey Crawshay (1892–1954), Welsh soldier and social benefactor who is most notable for his connections to rugby union
- Joseph Edward Crawshay Partridge (1890–1969), Welsh born international rugby union player
- Richard Crawshay (1739–1810), London iron merchant and then South Wales ironmaster
- Robert Thompson Crawshay (1817–1879), British ironmaster
- Rose Mary Crawshay (1828–1907), English philanthropist, wife of Robert Thompson Crawshay
- William Crawshay I (1764–1834), South Wales industrialist
- William Crawshay II (1788–1867), the son of William Crawshay I

== See also ==
- Crawshay's zebra (Equus quagga crawshayi), a subspecies of the plains zebra
- Rose Mary Crawshay Prize, literary prize for female scholars
