= Enid Wyn Jones =

Welsh nurse

Enid Wyn Jones (17 January 1909 – 15 September 1967) was a Welsh nurse, pacifist and Justice of the Peace.

Jones was born in Wrexham, the daughter of Dr. David Llewelyn Williams and Margaret Williams. Her younger brother Alun went on to become a poet. Just before World War I, she moved with her family to Cardiff but re-located to Rhyl where she was brought up during the war. She attended Ashford Welsh Girls' school from 1919-1926 and trained as a nurse at Cardiff Royal Infirmary.

On 9 September 1936, she married Emyr Wyn Jones of Waunfawr, Caernarfon, who was a cardiologist and physician at Liverpool Royal Infirmary. They had a son and a daughter. She travelled extensively throughout Wales and England due to her work but her home was at Llety'r Eros, Llansannan. She was a Justice of the Peace in Denbighshire for 12 years until her death and her work primarily surrounded religious, social and medical fields in England and Wales. She was a member of the Quaker church.

== Young Women's Christian Association ==
Jones was heavily involved with the Young Women's Christian Association (YWCA). Through this connection she was:

- Involved with the Presidency of the Welsh Council and Vice-Presidency of the British Council from 1959-1967
- Representative the Welsh Council at meetings/conferences abroad and was a member of the World Council
- President of the Women's Section of the National Free Church Council of England and Wales, 1958-1959
- President of the Women's Branch of the New Wales Union, 1966-1967

== Medical career ==
Jones made meaningful and considerable contributions towards the field of nursing and medical administration. She was:

- Vice-chairman of the Nursing Advisory Council
- Member of the Welsh Hospital Board
- Member of North Wales Mental Hospital administration
- Contributor to the Clwyd and Deeside Hospital Management Committees
- Member of the Medical Executive Committee of Denbighshire and Flintshire, plus in the Central Committee of the Royal Medical Benevolent Fund
- County Vice-President and Commandant of the Denbighshire Branch of the British Red Cross Society.

Jones attended various meetings regarding social, religious and medical matters all over the world representing YWCA and was a member of BBC Religious Committee. While on a flight home from Melbourne, where she had been representing Wales at the World Council of YWCA, she died on 15 September 1967. She was buried in Llansannan.

Her husband published a book of her life in 1968.
