= Edward-Rhys Harry =

- Born: November 22, 1973 (age 52); Swansea, Wales
- Education: Bangor University (BMus), London College of Music (MMus), Royal Welsh College of Music & Drama (MA), University of Aberdeen (PhD)
- Genres: Classical music, contemporary music
- Occupations: Conductor, composer, musical director
- Website: www.edwardrhysharry.com

Edward-Rhys Harry (born 22 November 1973) is a Welsh choral conductor and composer. He is the musical development and wellbeing manager for the Military Wives Choirs and the musical director of the London Welsh Male Voice Choir. He also serves as composer-in-residence for the "Music for Life" charity.

== Education ==
Harry was educated at Gowerton School. He graduated with a BMus from Bangor University and an MMus in Composition from the London College of Music. He received an MA in Choral Conducting from the Royal Welsh College of Music & Drama, where his studies were supported by the Glynne Jones and Laura Ashley Foundation scholarships. During this period, he also gained professional experience working with the British Sinfonietta.

In 2014, he completed a PhD in composition at the University of Aberdeen under the supervision of Paul Mealor. He was the first recipient of the university's Elphinstone Scholarship in Music.

== Career ==
In 2012, Harry was appointed the musical director of the London Welsh Male Voice Choir, succeeding Haydn James. In this role, he has conducted various events, including the biennial festival at the Royal Albert Hall. In 2019, he conducted a festival performance featuring over 800 singers and bass-baritone Bryn Terfel.

He has also been involved in the development of choral competitions, including new categories for the Llangollen International Musical Eisteddfod.

In 2024, he was appointed Musical Development and Wellbeing Manager for the Military Wives Choirs, where he is responsible for the musical direction of approximately 70 choirs. During the COVID-19 pandemic, he spoke to media outlets, including NME, regarding the role of choral singing in community mental health.

== Awards and honors ==
- Glanville Jones Award (2020): Awarded by the Welsh Music Guild for outstanding contributions to music in Wales.
- Tlws y Cerddor (The Musicians’ Medal, 2022): Awarded at the National Eisteddfod of Wales for the chamber opera Yr Islawr (The Basement).
- Classic FM Queen's Platinum Jubilee Competition (2022): Winner in the "Britain’s Big Platinum Performance" category.

== Professional recognition ==
Harry is a Fellow of the Royal Society of Arts (FRSA) and a member of the Royal Society of Musicians. He is the author of the book The Listening Conductor (2022) and contributes regularly to choral conducting literature. His compositions are published by prominent houses, including Oxford University Press and Boosey & Hawkes.
