= Gwenlyn Parry =

Welsh dramatist

William Gwenlyn Parry (8 June 1932 – 5 November 1991) was a Welsh dramatist, the author of several plays in Welsh, including Saer Doliau (1966), Ty ar y Tywod (1968), Y Ffin (1973), Panto, Sal and Y Tŵr (1978).

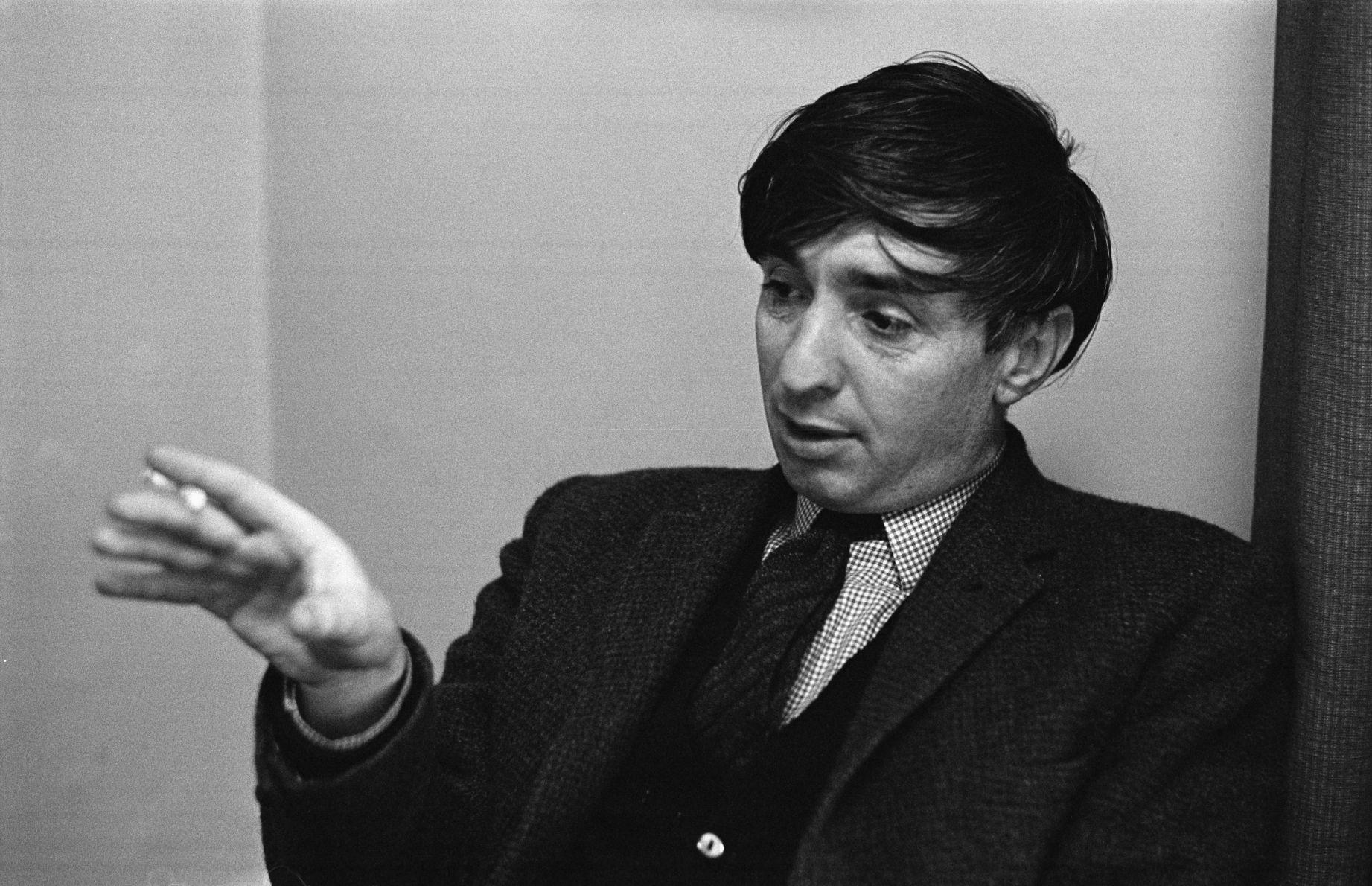
Image of Gwenlyn Parry

== Early life ==
Parry was born in the Welsh slate-quarrying village of Deiniolen, Caernarfonshire (Gwynedd). He initially worked as a teacher, teaching mathematics at a school in London and later science through the medium of Welsh in Bethesda, Wales.

== Drama ==
Parry joined BBC Wales in 1966 and helped to establish the scripts department, where he worked on Welsh programmes such as Pobol y Cwm. He also has writing credits for the TV play Grand Slam and the feature film Un Nos 'Ola Leuad (based on the book by Caradog Prichard).

Parry's early work has been called Absurdist. He created and co-wrote the comedy series Fo a Fe with Rhydderch Jones.

== Family ==
Parry was married twice, first to Joy and then to Ann Beynon. He had two daughters from his first marriage and a son and a daughter from his second. He died in the Cardiff area of South Wales in 1991. He is buried in Macpela, Penygroes, Gwynedd.
