= A. J. Sylvester =

British Official

Albert James Sylvester CBE JP (24 November 1889 – 27 October 1989) served as Principal Private Secretary to British statesman David Lloyd George from 1923 until Lloyd George's death in March 1945.

== Life and career ==
Albert James Sylvester was born in Harlaston, Staffordshire, where his father was a farmer. By 1901 the family had relocated to Burton upon Trent, where his father worked as a labourer at a brewery.

Sylvester worked as a freelance shorthand writer. At the age of 21 he won a competition to find the fastest typist in Britain.

Sylvester served as private secretary to the Secretary to the Committee of Imperial Defence, 1914–1921, to the Secretary of the War Cabinet and the Cabinet, 1916–1921, to the Secretary of the Imperial War Cabinet, 1917, to the British Secretary of the Paris Peace Conference, 1919, and to three successive Prime Ministers, 1921-3: Lloyd George, Bonar Law and Stanley Baldwin. He ran Lloyd George's private office in London.

After Lloyd George's death, A. J. Sylvester earned his living as a member of Lord Beaverbrook's staff from 1945 until 1948, and spent a further year as unpaid assistant to the Liberal Party leader, Clement Davies.

In 1947, he published The Real Lloyd George, based on his diaries. In 1949, he retired from political life, and moved to a farm at Corsham, Wiltshire, England, where he served as JP. His ambition to publish a full-scale autobiography, upon which he was actively engaged in extreme old age, never came to fruition. His papers provide an insight into the life of Lloyd George after his fall from power in 1922.

== Honours ==
He was appointed a Member of the Order of the British Empire in the 1918 Birthday Honours, an Officer in the 1919 New Year Honours, and a Commander of the Order in the 1920 New Year Honours. He was made a Commander of the Order of the Crown of Italy in 1921.
