= Smiley's People (TV series) =

British television miniseries

- Opening title
- Based on: Smiley's People by John le Carré
- Written by: John Hopkins
- Screenplay by: John le Carré
- Directed by: Simon Langton
- Starring: Alec Guinness; Michael Byrne; Anthony Bate; Bernard Hepton
- Theme music composer: Patrick Gowers
- Country of origin: United Kingdom
- Original language: English
- No. of series: 1
- No. of episodes: 6

Production
- Producer: Jonathan Powell
- Cinematography: Kenneth MacMillan
- Editors: Chris Wimble; Clare Douglas
- Running time: 360 min (UK)
- Production companies: BBC Worldwide; Paramount Domestic Television

Original release
- Network: BBC2
- Release: 20 September – 25 October 1982

Related
- Tinker Tailor Soldier Spy

Smiley’s People is a 1982 British six-part spy drama by the BBC. Directed by Simon Langton and produced by Jonathan Powell, it is the television adaptation of the 1979 spy novel Smiley's People by John le Carré, and a sequel to Tinker Tailor Soldier Spy (missing out the second book in the trilogy, The Honourable Schoolboy, which was not filmed for cost reasons). Starring Alec Guinness, Michael Byrne, Anthony Bate and Bernard Hepton, it was first shown in the United Kingdom from 20 September to 25 October 1982, and in the United States beginning on 25 October 1982.

== Plot ==
George Smiley is called out of retirement when one of his former assets, an émigré general, is found murdered. In tidying up loose ends for the "Circus", his former employer, he discovers a clandestine operation run by his nemesis.

== Cast ==
- Alec Guinness as George Smiley
- Eileen Atkins as Madame Ostrakova
- Michael Byrne as Peter Guillam
- Bernard Hepton as Toby Esterhase
- Anthony Bate as Sir Oliver Lacon
- Barry Foster as Sir Saul Enderby
- Michael Lonsdale as Anton Grigoriev
- Beryl Reid as Connie Sachs
- Bill Paterson as Lauder Strickland
- Siân Phillips as Ann Smiley
- Mario Adorf as Claus Kretschmar
- Tessy Kuhls as Frau Kretzschmar
- Patrick Stewart as Karla
- Curd Jürgens as Gen. Vladimir
- Vladek Sheybal as Otto Leipzig
- Rosalie Crutchley as Mother Felicity
- Maureen Lipman as Stella Craven
- Dudley Sutton as Oleg Kirov
- Michael Gough as Mikhel
- Michael Elphick as Detective Chief Superintendent
- Paul Herzberg as Villem Craven
- Stephen Riddle as Nigel Mostyn
- Tusse Silberg as Alexandra/Tatiana
- Norma West as Hilary
- Ingrid Pitt as Elvira
- Lucy Fleming as Molly Meakin
- Andrew Bradford as Ferguson
- Joe Praml as Paul Skordeno
- Alan Rickman as Mr Brownlow
- Tanya Rees as Beckie Craven
- Alex Jennings as PC Hall

== Production ==
The series was produced in partnership with the BBC and Paramount Pictures with a budget of $3 million. Due to the success of Tinker, Tailor, Soldier, Spy, director John Irvin had begun making movies and was unavailable. Later in pre-production, Simon Langton replaced John MacKenzie, Irvin's initial successor as director of the series. According to Michael Jayston (who himself could not reprise his role from Tinker, Tailor, Soldier, Spy for various reasons), this was at the behest of Guinness, who was unhappy with MacKenzie. During filming, Guinness was not satisfied with Langton either, writing; "I felt dubious about Simon's work... I greatly miss John Irvin's grip and inner tension." Arthur Hopcraft declined the offer to write the screenplay and was replaced by John Hopkins. Author le Carré was called in to help resolve technical difficulties within the script. In contrast to the public television broadcast of Tinker Tailor Soldier Spy, Smiley's People was telecast in the U.S. in November 1982 as an Operation Prime Time presentation on some 100 independent commercial stations across the country.

The bridge leading from East to West Berlin for the defection scene was Lady Bay Bridge, located in the Midlands city of Nottingham. Other location shooting was done in Berne, Hamburg, Paris, and London.

== Reception ==
The initial reviews were good, but the enthusiasm decreased as the series progressed. A contemporary review in The New York Times described the production as a "marvelously riveting television film" and referred to Guinness's performance as stunning and the supporting company as outstanding. The review summarized the series as "the best show you are likely to see on television for the time being." In a retrospective review, Neal Justin of the Star Tribune called Guinness's portrayal of Smiley as "a master class in subtle acting." Mark Lawson of The Guardian called the adaptation, "among the most beautiful and enduring achievements of TV drama."

== Awards ==
In 1983 Smiley's People won four BAFTA awards, including Best Actor (for Alec Guinness), Best Actress (for Beryl Reid), best cinematography (Kenneth MacMillan), and was nominated for six others. The series also won a Peabody Award, for "excellence in story telling". In 2010, The Guardian ranked the series at number 17 in their list of "The Top 50 TV Dramas of All Time".

== Commercial releases ==
Smiley's People was released on VHS in 1991 (BBCV 4606) and 1999 (BBCV 6767). It was released on Region 2 DVD in 2004 (BBCDVD 1183), and in 2011 bundled with Tinker Tailor Soldier Spy (BBCDVD 3535). A remastered Blu-ray edition was released in 2020 (BBCBD0502).

Patrick Gowers' soundtrack was released by BBC Records in 1982 (REP 439, vinyl and ZCH439, cassette), and re-released on blue vinyl (DEMREC710) and as MP3 in 2020 by Demon Records.
