= A Legacy of Spies =

2017 spy novel by John le Carré

- Hardback edition cover
- Author: John le Carré
- Language: English
- Genre: Spy fiction
- Publisher: Viking Press
- Publication date: 5 September 2017
- Publication place: United Kingdom
- Media type: Print (hardcover and paperback)
- Pages: 272
- ISBN: 978-0735225114
- LC Class: PR6062.E33 L43 2017

A Legacy of Spies is a 2017 spy novel by British writer John le Carré. It is both a prequel and a sequel to John le Carré's The Spy Who Came in from the Cold and Tinker Tailor Soldier Spy. It was the last of le Carré's novels to include his regular protagonist George Smiley, although le Carré's son Nick Harkaway would subsequently pen the continuation novel Karla's Choice which features Smiley and many of the father's other characters.

As of 2026, a BBC television adaptation using the novel's title and material from the novel and The Spy Who Came in from the Cold is currently in production.

== Background ==
In The Spy Who Came in from the Cold, Alec Leamas, an agent of the British overseas intelligence agency called "The Circus", who is motivated by the death of his operative Karl Riemeck while crossing from East Berlin to West Berlin, agrees to undertake one final mission to get revenge on the man he believes to be Riemeck's murderer, a high-ranking member of the Stasi named Hans-Dieter Mundt. In the course of Leamas's mission, which finds him unexpectedly extracted to East Berlin, he – along with his lover, a young British Communist sympathiser named Liz Gold – is shot dead at the Berlin Wall, on orders of Mundt. The men responsible for dispatching Leamas – intelligence chief Control, Control's right-hand-man George Smiley, and Smiley's protégé Peter Guillam – escape unscathed, and it is revealed that Mundt was a double agent whom the entire mission (except for the murders of Gold and Leamas, which were done by Mundt on his own) was designed to protect, which was never told to Leamas.

In Tinker Tailor Soldier Spy, a retired Smiley is clandestinely brought back to The Circus about a year after the failure of "Operation Testify" (followed closely by the replacement and death of Control) to locate a Soviet double agent ("mole") within the agency from among the four possibilities known to Guillam, who was still an active agent (although demoted). After an investigation, the most likely candidate, Smiley's rival Bill Haydon, is captured while meeting with his Soviet handler . . . and then is murdered, apparently by former Circus agent Jim Prideaux, who had been a close friend (and perhaps lover) of Haydon's at Oxford -- and was the agent working for Control on Operation Testify who was betrayed to the Soviets by Haydon, resulting in torture and injuries that left Prideaux permanently crippled.

== Plot overview ==
Now retired to his family farm in his native Brittany, Peter Guillam – who narrates the story in the first person – is summoned to Circus headquarters to account for his actions during Operation Windfall, the espionage mission depicted in The Spy Who Came in from the Cold. During hostile interrogation by two Circus lawyers (who take Guillam's British passport and keep it so that he can't flee, not knowing that he had already stashed his French passport in London), Guillam learns that Alec Leamas's adult son, Christoph (whom Guillam had met as a sullen boy), and Liz Gold's adult daughter, Karen (whom Liz had given up for adoption), are suing the British government for the wrongful deaths of their parents and have already turned down a £1,000,000 settlement offer (which Christoph later tells Guillam has been increased to £2,000,000 along with a secrecy requirement, which has been turned down by Karen's nonprofit lawyers). From there, the book alternates between the past, told through written reports and Guillam's recollections, and the present, in which The Circus's lawyers are portraying Guillam as the chief villain to a pending parliamentary inquiry.

Guillam's recollections of The Circus under Control focus on its division into two working groups: (1) Joint Steering ("Joint"), headed by Haydon, which had control of most facilities and The Circus's overseas outposts, and (2) Covert, headed by Smiley, which (as the name implied) ran ultra-secret covert operations due to a nagging belief that the Soviets had penetrated The Circus. As a result, most of the Covert historical records within The Circus, to the extent they still exist, hide the real truth of the operations, making them similar to the records that emerged from Stasi files after the fall of East Germany (which were the basis of the lawsuit). Key to the story are Guillam's ruminations on the events that led to the death of Riemeck and his agent Doris Gamp, code-named "Tulip", a Stasi clerk married to one Stasi officer but having an affair with a more senior one, who had, on her own initiative, provided Riemeck with photos of many top-secret Stasi and Soviet documents.

Leamas, head of station in West Berlin, had informed both Covert and Joint about his initial approach by an unknown East German with top-secret photos, and the subsequent search in East Berlin for the source of these photos convinced Smiley, Guillam, and Leamas that the Soviet penetration was within Joint. However, when Tulip needed to be extracted from East Berlin on an emergency basis due to her husband's suspicions about her triggered by the search, Joint denied permission for use of its overseas stations for the exfiltration -- but Leamas conducted it anyway, getting Tulip into the British embassy in Prague, which is where Guillam (her handoff contact, to whom she had been romantically attracted from their first meeting) appeared as both a French delegate to a farming convention and her husband -- and Guillam and Tulip successfully flew from there to France after the convention. Tulip was then flown to England and taken to a covert farm run by Joint (due to its participation in her exfiltration), where she was promptly murdered by Stasi hitman Mundt, who was then captured after stepping into an ancient leg-hold trap on site while escaping. Because Smiley knew Mundt (Call for the Dead), he knew that Mundt's cover story was false and was able to arrange for Mundt to become a British mole and receive help from Covert to advance to higher levels in the Stasi (thus, "Operation Windfall"). The other agents at the safe house were told only that Tulip had killed herself, and that the unidentified person caught in the leg-hold trap worked for internal Circus security. The only people who knew the truth were the handful from Covert who had been "read into" Operation Windfall, including Control, Smiley, Guillam, and Prideaux (who was the handoff contact for Mundt). Later, after Control came up with a plan to remove Mundt's main competitor, Guillam scouted Liz Gold for Smiley, and it was during this research that (after a tip from Smiley) Guillam told Liz about the librarian job that she held when she met Leamas.

Because the Stasi files show Tulip's infatuation with Guillam (discussed in letters she sent to her sister) and Circus records show Liz's strong attraction to Guillam (which she discussed in her diary), Guillam's defense lawyer informs him that Circus lawyers have concocted a narrative with Guillam as a Lothario, who seduced an unwilling and unhappy Tulip to come to England, also seduced Liz into an ill-conceived attempt to undermine the Stasi with false evidence, and bribed or otherwise persuaded his friend Leamas to lead that operation. However, in the course of her defense, the lawyer covertly acquires secret reports compiled by Special Branch (apparently requested by Joint in an effort to identify the source of Operation Windfall), who had tailed Leamas after he was pensioned by The Circus. After reading them, she concludes correctly that Leamas's descent after pensioning was faked under orders from Control, that Liz's inadvertent "betrayal" of Leamas had been planned by Control and Smiley, and that, if certain perhaps-nonexistent covert records that would confirm this could be produced, the parliamentary inquiry would immediately terminate without Guillam even having to testify. That night, Christoph Leamas finds Guillam and tries to murder him at gunpoint but breaks down before pulling the trigger.

Guillam, who knows the whereabouts of those "nonexistent" records (including a tape-recording of Smiley's deal with Mundt), then retrieves his French passport and talks to the records' keeper, who tells him (as he expected) that she still has them but needs an OK from Smiley before she could release them. Guillam then locates Prideaux, still at the same prep school as in Tinker Tailor Soldier Spy, who tells him to contact Smiley at a particular library at the University of Freiburg in Germany, near both the French and Swiss borders. Upon arriving in Freiburg, Guillam learns that, as he expected, Smiley has never been contacted by The Circus during the investigation but is furious about the focus on Guillam (noting that "I was too high up in the pecking order for their tastes"). Smiley agrees to not only authorize the release of the covert records but to also provide a deposition about the events, noting to Guillam that everything he had done had been motivated by his vision of "leading Europe out of her darkness toward a new age of reason". After that all happens, Guillam returns to his farm in Brittany.

== Updates ==
During the events of the book, updates are provided on several characters from earlier books:

- Shortly after the events of The Spy Who Came in from the Cold, Mundt was summoned to Moscow for a meeting and disappeared, apparently murdered.
- The male head of the prep school at which Prideaux taught ran off with a male lover and took all the school funds, but Prideaux (with Smiley's help) used his savings to keep the school operating through the crisis, resulting in him having a teaching job there for life.
- After the events of Smiley's People, Karla was resettled in South America teaching Russian, but he fatally shot himself after a year.
- Smiley still had occasional visits from his estranged wife Ann, during which they walked in the Black Forest.

== Themes ==
In an interview with the NPR series Fresh Air broadcast in the United States on 5 September 2017, le Carré told host Terry Gross that one of the reasons for writing the novel was "to make a case for Europe" in the wake of the 2016 British referendum, which resulted in a slim majority voting in favour of leaving the European Union. One conversation in the novel sounds like an emotional case for Remain and against Brexit: "'So was it all for England, then?' [Smiley] resumed. 'There was a time, of course there was. But whose England? Which England? England all alone, a citizen of nowhere? (Note: In a speech to the Conservative Party Conference on 4 October 2016, British Prime Minister Theresa May said "if you believe you're a citizen of the world, you're a citizen of nowhere". The sentence has attracted continuing criticism.) I'm a European, Peter."

== Critical reception ==
Writing in The Guardian, reviewer Robert McCrum called the novel "poignant and brilliant". Despite some misgivings, The New York Times reviewer Dwight Garner described it as "simmering".

== Television adaptation ==
In March 2025, it was announced that the series Legacy of Spies, which would be based on multiple Smiley novels, was in the works, with Matthew Macfadyen playing Smiley.

In December 2025, the television series was announced as officially picked up by BBC in the UK, and MGM+ in the United States. It was also announced that the first season would be based on John le Carré's 1963 novel The Spy Who Came in From the Cold while also drawing on material from his 2017 novel A Legacy of Spies, with the author's son Stephen Cornwell and Clarissa Ingram writing the adaptation. Additions to the cast include Charlie Hunnam as Alec Leamas, Devrim Lingnau as Doris Quinz aka Agent Tulip and Daniel Brühl as East German spy Jens Fiedler. In March 2026, the series was reported to be filming in Prague, Czech Republic.

Subsequent casting includes Dan Stevens as Bill Haydon, Felix Kammerer as Hans-Dieter Mundt, Agnes O'Casey as Liz Gold, Volker Bruch as Emmanuel Rapp, Saskia Rosendahl as Lotte Gamp, Patrick Güldenberg as Dr. Karl Riemeck, Safia Oakley-Green as Molly Gibson, Jake Dunn as Peter Guillam, Ariyon Bakare as Cy Aflon, Hugh Laurie as Control, Joe Alwyn as Jim Prideaux, Anjana Vasan as Connie Sachs, Charlotte Ritchie as Ann Smiley, Lee Ross as Inspector Oliver Mendel, James McArdle as Percy Alleline, John Dagleish as Roy Bland, Goran Bogdan as Toby Esterhase, and Adam Hugill as Fawn, with Michael Lennox and Claudia Llosa directing the episodes.
