= Karla's Choice =

Spy novel by Nick Harkaway

- Author: Nick Harkaway
- Language: English
- Series: George Smiley
- Genre: Spy novel
- Publisher: Viking Press (UK)
- Publication date: 2024
- Publication place: United Kingdom
- Media type: Print (Hardback)
- Pages: 320
- ISBN: 978-0241714904 First edition hardback

Karla's Choice is a novel by Nick Harkaway published by Viking Press on 24 October 2024. Karla's Choice is the first George Smiley continuation novel published after John le Carré's 2020 death. The novel is set in the time period between The Spy Who Came in from the Cold and Tinker Tailor Soldier Spy.

Nick Harkaway is the pen name of Nicholas Cornwell, the son of David Cornwell who wrote the original Smiley novels under the John le Carré pen name. While the cover identifies Harkaway as the author it also describes the book as "a John le Carré novel".

== Development ==
In 2023, Penguin Random House announced that their imprint, Viking Press, would be publishing a novel (at the time untitled) written by Cornwell's son and set in the world of George Smiley. Both Harkaway and le Carré were to be credited on the cover of the new work.

Harkaway said in newspaper interviews that his father had wanted his legacy to be continued, and that he had undertaken the novel on that basis despite initial misgivings.

== Characters ==
- George Smiley - a career intelligence officer with "The Circus", the British overseas intelligence agency. He is a central character in the novels Call for the Dead, A Murder of Quality, Tinker Tailor Soldier Spy, The Honourable Schoolboy and Smiley's People.
- László Bánáti - London based Hungarian émigré and literary agent, actually a cover identity for Toby Esterhase.
- Ferencz Róka - a Soviet agent.
- Szusanna Gero - assistant to Bánáti, recruited as an agent by Smiley.
- Miki Bortnik - Moscow Centre hitman, sent to kill Róka.
- Control - head of "The Circus".
- Irén - Róka's lover, academic and poet, still living in Hungary.
- Léo - Róka's son by Irén, living in East Germany, and frequently getting into trouble with the authorities.
- Karla - codename of a Soviet Intelligence officer, he is the head of the Thirteenth Directorate of Moscow Centre, le Carré's fictional version of the KGB, and the nemesis of Smiley. Karla is the central antagonist in Tinker Tailor Soldier Spy, The Honourable Schoolboy, and Smiley's People.
- Connie Sachs - works in the research department at "The Circus".
- Peter Guillam - Circus officer based in Berlin, tasked with handling Mundt, under the cover of a fur import business.
- Hans-Dieter Mundt - Stasi officer based in East Berlin and double agent of The Circus.
- Tom Lake - Circus 'scalphunter'.
- Jim Prideaux - Circus 'scalphunter' normally resident in Czechoslovakia.

== Plot ==
Karla's Choice is set in 1963, during the immediate aftermath of the events described in The Spy Who Came in from the Cold and almost ten years before the events depicted in Tinker Tailor Soldier Spy. Troubled by the death of field agent Alec Leamas and disaffected with The Circus (le Carré's fictional version of the British Secret Intelligence Service MI6), spymaster George Smiley has retired, apparently happily with his wife, Ann.

In the office of a small London literary agent, Szusanna Gero discovers that her fellow Hungarian émigré and employer László Bánáti has gone missing. On the same day, professional killer Miki Bortnik arrives at the office with the intention of killing Bánáti, but apparently has a religious vision, and allows himself to be taken into The Circus by Gero, who acts with remarkable initiative and calmness under pressure. Smiley is once again brought out of retirement by Control and assigned the task of tracking down Bánáti.

Smiley quickly discovers that Bánáti is the pseudonym of Soviet agent Ferencz Róka and that Bortnik had been sent by Moscow Centre to kill him. Smiley initially focuses on understanding why they would be trying to kill one of their own. His investigations reveal that Róka has a son Léo, who lives behind the Iron Curtain in East Germany. The boy's mother Irén has been writing to Róka with increasing urgency as Léo keeps getting into trouble with the authorities, and Róka has been pulling strings to get him released from custody. For reasons Smiley cannot understand, he has sought the assistance from Bogdan, a former friend he attempted to falsely betray many years before during a wave of purges, necessitating his exile from Hungary. Róka makes increasingly desperate appeals to his Russian handler after Léo's latest arrest, from which, this time, he has failed to get him released. Róka, realising his life was in danger, went on the run. A document forger used by Róka leads Smiley to believe Róka may be using fake passports to head to East Germany to rescue his son.

Meanwhile Bortnik seems willing to defect and Smiley persuades him to propose a final crash meeting with his Moscow Centre handler before disappearing (into a Circus safe house). At the meeting, following Smiley's instructions, Bortnik explains that the killing has not yet happened because somehow Róka ran before it could be achieved, but gives the impression that he intends to complete the job. The forger has also revealed that Róka partly paid for his fake passports with his own Moscow Centre issued one. The forger sold it on to a third party who, while using the document to enter Switzerland, is killed by Moscow Centre believing the bearer to be Róka. Smiley realises he has a short window of opportunity to find Róka before Moscow deduces that Bortnik has been turned and that Róka is still alive.

Smiley and Circus "scalphunter" Tom Lake head to West Berlin, where they meet Circus officer Peter Guillam, currently assigned the task of handling Stasi officer and Circus double agent Hans-Dieter Mundt. They are joined by Gero, who has been recruited by Control, to the disapproval of Smiley, who has fears for her safety. Smiley hopes to use Mundt to exfiltrate Róka from East Berlin, if and when he arrives. Guillam asks Mundt to trace Léo and he reports back that the Stasi paper trail implies that he was arrested but released. However, there is a strong suspicion that he may actually have died in custody. Further, Karla has arrived from Moscow Centre's Thirteenth Directorate, aiming to expunge the record of the arrest. Smiley considers it likely that Róka's murder was ordered by Karla to tie up a possible loose end. Realising they have lost their advantage, and unable to do anything further in Berlin, Smiley, Gero and Lake travel to Vienna, with the intention of approaching Irén across the border in Budapest.

Smiley, Lake and Gero formulate a plan to contrive a supposedly accidental meeting between Lake and Irén, in which he would make vague promises to rescue Léo in return for her assistance in facilitating a meeting with Róka and his possible defection to the west. However, Gero is unhappy with the idea of giving Irén false hope that her son is still alive, so instead formulates her own plan to approach Irén, and quickly crosses the border before Smiley knows of her change of heart. Meanwhile, still in Vienna, Smiley realises that he is being followed and possibly has had his cover blown.

Gero meets Irén who explains that Róka, despite the danger, approached Bogdan for assistance because he had been a father figure to a senior Moscow Centre operative, implied to be Karla. Róka knows that Karla has sufficient seniority to get Léo released, and with no other options, hopes to appeal to his former friend's paternal feelings. No sooner has Irén made this revelation to Gero than Smiley and Lake arrive to extricate them both, pursued by the Hungarian security services. During their escape, facilitated by Jim Prideaux, Lake is shot and left behind.

Smiley, Gero and Irén escape via Czechoslovakia and Austria back to London. With the information Irén had recounted to Gero, Smiley works out that by reaching out for Karla's assistance in securing the release of Léo, Róka risked revealing Karla's actual identity, and consequently Karla decided to eliminate him. The Circus researchers track Bogdan down to Portugal, and Smiley attempts to trade that knowledge for Lake's safe return. Karla's response is simply to kill Bogdan and Róka and it transpires that Lake is already dead from his gunshot wounds. Léo's fate is uncertain, but it is likely he died under interrogation. Gero is not permitted to know what happened to Irén, but accepts a job with The Circus.

Karla is revealed to be a ruthless fanatic, hardening both Control and Smiley's resolve to unmask him. Smiley is faced with the choice of a happy retirement with Ann, or a return to his life with his "grey mistress", The Circus, in pursuit of Karla. He chooses the latter.

== Reception ==
The Guardian reviewer Steven Poole says the novel "expertly evokes the atmosphere of the originals." In a five star review in The Daily Telegraph, Jake Kerridge says "Harkaway's new recreation of the Smiley milieu, is note-perfect."
