= Control (fictional character) =

Character by John le Carré

- George Smiley character
- First appearance: The Spy Who Came in from the Cold
- Last appearance: Karla's Choice
- Created by: John le Carré

In-universe information
- Gender: Male
- Occupation: Intelligence officer
- Affiliation: The Circus
- Nationality: British

Control is a fictional character, created by John le Carré, who is the head of the British overseas intelligence agency (nicknamed "The Circus" after its location in Cambridge Circus, London). He is a character in the novels The Spy Who Came in from the Cold and The Looking Glass War, and is referred to in Tinker Tailor Soldier Spy and several others, usually by le Carré's recurring protagonist George Smiley, who served as Control's right-hand man.

"Control" is a nom de guerre, based on the real codename for the head of MI6, 'C'. The character's real name is never given, and it is suggested that he successfully kept his true identity secret even from his inner circle of advisors. His wife believes him to be a minor civil servant in the Ministry of Agriculture and Fisheries. In the original screenplay for the film adaptation of Tinker Tailor Soldier Spy, Smiley muses that Control had once told him that Howard Staunton was the greatest chess master Britain had ever produced. "Staunton" later turns out to be the name that Control used for the rental of a flat he uses.

== In the novels ==
Control is not featured in the first two George Smiley novels, with his role instead being filled by a manipulative civil servant named Maston. Smiley clashes with Maston on multiple occasions, most notably in Call for the Dead. It is unclear what circumstances led to Control's replacement of Maston and the exact extent of Control's background in the Service. Control is depicted as liked by Smiley, who becomes his right hand man. The two characters share an affinity for deception and penchant for ruthlessly pragmatic strategy.

=== The Spy Who Came in from the Cold ===
Control first appears in Le Carré's third book, The Spy Who Came in from the Cold, co-ordinating the simulated defection of Alec Leamas, a former West Berlin station chief who witnesses the killing of his source by Hans-Dieter Mundt. After killing Samuel Fennan in Call for the Dead, Mundt gained significant power in East German Counterintelligence that instigated a power struggle with his deputy, Jens Fiedler. Control organises Leamas' demotion and dismissal, enabling Leamas to be approached to defect by East Germany. Control, however, orchestrates the escalation of the power struggle by secretly having Smiley leave a trail indicating Leamas is still an agent. Following the submission of arrest warrants by Fiedler and Mundt for each other, Leamas is blown and offers to blow the mission to save Liz Gold, a visiting CPGB member who is also Leamas' lover. Mundt triumphs over Fiedler, whilst Leamas and Gold are arrested. When Mundt frees them however, the actual mission is revealed: Control orchestrated Fiedler's downfall to protect Mundt, who is secretly a British asset.

=== The Looking Glass War ===
Control next appears during The Looking Glass War, undermining The Department, a military intelligence directorate and rival to The Circus who are barely afloat and receive funding predominantly due to their research work. Control arranges material support for The Department in an operation to verify an alleged missile battery development in Germany, providing surplus radio equipment for the operation. Secretly, however, Control works with Smiley to orchestrate the downfall of The Department and sacrifice its agent, Fred Leiser, leaving him to be captured by the East Germans.

=== Tinker Tailor Soldier Spy ===
The backstory of Tinker, Tailor, Soldier, Spy focuses on the end of Control's tenure. Seriously ill, Control spent his final months at the Circus losing power to his underling Percy Alleline and desperately hunting a mole within the Circus's senior ranks working for Soviet spymaster Karla.

Control's fixation with finding the mole ultimately proved to be his downfall. In 1973, he authorised "Operation Testify," an off-book operation to help a Czech general, who knew the mole's identity, defect. Unbeknownst to Control, however, the operation was actually a dangle. This led to the capture of field agent Jim Prideaux, after which Control was forced to retire in disgrace, and Alleline became head of the Circus.

Shortly after being ousted, Control died of an unidentified illness. However, other characters such as Roddy Martindale claim Control is actually alive; that he faked his death at the shame of being "driven out" by Alleline and has been spotted in South Africa. Martindale has heard this second-hand, and tells Smiley, who attended Control's cremation. Smiley rejects it as "the most idiotic story [he] has ever heard."

=== A Legacy of Spies ===
In A Legacy of Spies, during Peter Guillam's initial interview, it is revealed that there have been at least four "Controls" over the years.

== Inspiration ==
The real chief of the Secret Intelligence Service (the equivalent of Le Carre's Circus) is known by a similar name: "C". This originates from the initial used by Captain Sir Mansfield Smith-Cumming, RN, an early chief of the service, who signed his letters "C" in green ink. This custom has been upheld throughout the history of the service.

== In other media ==
=== Film ===
- Cyril Cusack portrayed Control in the 1965 film adaptation of The Spy Who Came In from the Cold.
- In the 2011 adaptation of Tinker Tailor Soldier Spy, Control was played by John Hurt. He is shown signing himself as "C", and a photograph is briefly shown of a younger Control in uniform as a brigadier during the Second World War.

=== Television ===
- Alexander Knox portrayed Control in the 1979 television drama adaptation of Tinker Tailor Soldier Spy.
- Stephen Fry played a surrealistically milquetoast parody of the character several times in the 1987 sketch comedy series A Bit of Fry & Laurie.
- Hugh Laurie will portray Control in the upcoming series Legacy of Spies.
