= Legacy of Spies =

Upcoming British spy drama series

- Based on: George Smiley works by John le Carré
- Written by: Stephen Cornwell; Clarissa Ingram
- Directed by: Michael Lennox; Claudia Llosa
- Starring: Matthew Macfadyen
- Country of origin: United Kingdom
- Original language: English

Production
- Executive producers: Stephen Cornwell; Graham Yost; Simon Cornwell; Michele Wolkoff; Malte Grunert; Chris Rice; Matthew Macfadyen; Charlie Hunnam; Michael Lennox; Joe Tsai; Arthur Wang; Susanne Bier; Mike Lesslie; Gaynor Holmes; Nick Lambon; Nick Cornwell
- Producer: Nancy Bray
- Production company: The Ink Factory

Original release
- Network: BBC (United Kingdom); MGM+ (United States)

Legacy of Spies is an upcoming British spy thriller television series. The series adapts several George Smiley novels by John le Carré including The Spy Who Came in from the Cold, Tinker Tailor Soldier Spy, The Honourable Schoolboy, A Legacy of Spies and other works. Matthew Macfadyen stars as George Smiley. The series is produced by The Ink Factory, and distributed by Fifth Season.

== Cast ==
- Matthew Macfadyen as George Smiley
- Charlie Hunnam as Alec Leamas
- Daniel Brühl as Jens Fiedler
- Devrim Lingnau as Doris Quinz / Agent Tulip
- Dan Stevens as Bill Haydon
- Felix Kammerer as Hans-Dieter Mundt
- Agnes O'Casey as Liz Gold
- Volker Bruch as Emmanuel Rapp
- Saskia Rosendahl as Lotte Gamp
- Patrick Güldenberg as Dr. Karl Riemeck
- Safia Oakley-Green as Molly Gibson
- Jake Dunn as Peter Guillam
- Ariyon Bakare as Cy Aflon
- Hugh Laurie as Control
- Joe Alwyn as Jim Prideaux
- Anjana Vasan as Connie Sachs
- Charlotte Ritchie as Ann Smiley
- Lee Ross as Inspector Oliver Mendel
- James McArdle as Percy Alleline
- John Dagleish as Roy Bland
- Goran Bogdan as Toby Esterhase
- Adam Hugill as Fawn

== Production ==
=== Development ===
As of March 2025, The Ink Factory was developing a television series titled Legacy of Spies with Fifth Season attached to distribute. It was announced in March 2025 that the series would adapt several works by John le Carré featuring the character George Smiley such as The Spy Who Came in from the Cold, Tinker Tailor Soldier Spy, The Honourable Schoolboy, and others. Graham Yost came on board as an executive producer, with Stephen Cornwell and Clarissa Ingram serving as writers and Matthew Macfadyen playing Smiley. The series was pitched and had received offers from potential buyers for continued development. In December 2025, Legacy of Spies received a series order to premiere on the BBC in the United Kingdom and on MGM+ in the United States. It was also announced that the first season would be based on John le Carré's 1963 novel The Spy Who Came in From the Cold while also drawing on material from his 2017 novel A Legacy of Spies.

Michael Lennox and Claudia Llosa serve as directors of the series. Stephen Cornwell who also showruns and Simon Cornwell executive produce the series alongside Yost, Macfadyen, Lennox, Charlie Hunnam who also stars, Michele Wolkoff, Malte Grunert, Chris Rice, Steve Clark-Hall, Joe Tsai, Arthur Wang, Susanne Bier, Mike Lesslie, Gaynor Holmes and Nick Lambon for the BBC, and Nick Cornwell for the John le Carré estate. Llosa and Sam Costin serve as co-executive producers and Nancy Bray produces the series. “Legacy of Spies” is produced by The Ink Factory in a co-production with Amusement Park Film and in association with 127 Wall Productions and Paramount Television Studios, with Fifth Season handling global sales.

=== Casting ===
Hunnam, Daniel Brühl, and Devrim Lingnau's castings were announced with the series order in December 2025. Dan Stevens, Felix Kammerer, Agnes O'Casey, Volker Bruch, Saskia Rosendahl, Patrick Güldenberg, Safia Oakley-Green, Jake Dunn, and Ariyon Bakare joined the cast in April 2026.

In June 2026, Hugh Laurie, Joe Alwyn, Anjana Vasan, Charlotte Ritchie, Lee Ross, James McArdle, John Dagleish, Goran Bogdan, and Adam Hugill were cast in the series.

=== Filming ===
Production began in April 2026 in Prague, Czech Republic. Filming took place in Liverpool in August 2026, utilising locations on Old Hall Street and St. George's Hall. It was announced in September 2026 that the filming had wrapped.
