= Gerald Westerby =

Character by John le Carré

- First appearance: Tinker Tailor Soldier Spy
- Last appearance: The Honourable Schoolboy
- Created by: John le Carré

In-universe information
- Gender: Male
- Occupation: Journalist, intelligence asset
- Affiliation: The Circus
- Nationality: British

The Honourable Clive Gerald Westerby, or Jerry Westerby, is a fictional character created by spy novelist John le Carré. He first appeared in Tinker Tailor Soldier Spy (1974), and is the titular figure in The Honourable Schoolboy (1977).

Son of ennobled newspaper magnate Samuel ("Sambo") Westerby, who died leaving little wealth, Westerby, a former cricketer and international sports journalist, is an "occasional" asset of British intelligence ("the Circus"). He was initially recruited by George Smiley, for whom he holds great respect. In Tinker Tailor Soldier Spy, he is approached by Smiley regarding information concerning the betrayal of Jim Prideaux on an assignment in Czechoslovakia. In The Honourable Schoolboy, Westerby is recalled from his semi-retirement in Italy and despatched to Hong Kong, in an effort to flush out a deep-cover Soviet spy in China.

== Portrayals ==
Westerby was played by Joss Ackland in the 1979 television adaptation of Tinker Tailor Soldier Spy. Played by Stephen Graham in the 2011 film adaptation, his role in the plot was amalgamated with that of Sam Collins from the novel.

Hugh Bonneville played the role of Westerby in the BBC Radio 4 dramatisation The Honourable Schoolboy, first broadcast in January 2010.
