= The Incongruous Spy =

Book by John le Carré

- First edition
- Author: John le Carré
- Language: English
- Series: George Smiley
- Genre: Crime, Spy novel
- Publisher: Walker and Company
- Publication date: 1964
- Publication place: United Kingdom
- Media type: Print (hardback & paperback)

The Incongruous Spy: Two Novels of Suspense (1964), by John le Carré, is an omnibus edition of le Carré's first two novels Call for the Dead (1961) and A Murder of Quality (1962). The omnibus, about George Smiley, was released after his third novel, The Spy Who Came in from the Cold (1963).

== See also ==
- Smiley Versus Karla
