= A Small Town in Germany =

1968 novel by John le Carré

- First edition cover
- Author: John le Carré
- Language: English
- Genre: Spy fiction
- Publisher: William Heinemann
- Publication date: October 1968
- Publication place: United Kingdom
- Media type: Print (hardback and paperback)
- Pages: 304
- ISBN: 0-434-10930-4
- OCLC: 887880
- Dewey Decimal: 823/.9/14
- LC Class: PZ4.L4526 Sm PR6062.E33

A Small Town in Germany is a 1968 espionage novel by the British author John le Carré. It is set in Bonn, the "small town" of the title, against a background of concern that former Nazis were returning to positions of power in West Germany. It is notable for being le Carré's first novel not to feature his recurring protagonist George Smiley or "The Circus," le Carré's fictionalised version of MI6.

== Setting ==
Bonn, the "small town" of the title, was chosen as West Germany's capital after the Second World War mainly due to the advocacy of Konrad Adenauer, the Chancellor of West Germany.

== Plot summary ==
The novel is set in the late 1960s, in Bonn, the capital of West Germany. The UK is hoping to gain support from the West German government in a bid to enter the European common market. From London, Alan Turner, an official from the British Foreign Office, arrives to investigate the disappearance of minor British Embassy officer Leo Harting, along with a number of secret files. The embassy's head of Chancery, Rawley Bradfield, is hostile to Turner's investigation. Despite that, he is dinner party host to Turner and Ludwig Siebkron, head of the German Interior Ministry; the latter is close to industrialist Klaus Karfeld, who is successfully building a new nationalist political movement which is anti-British and anti-Western European, and which seeks to turn West Germany away from Western Europe and bring it closer to Communist Eastern Europe. Great Britain's diplomatic mission perceives growing support for Karfeld's movement as a threat to obtaining support for Britain's entry into the Common Market.

Initially, Turner suspects Harting is a spy, probably working for a Communist government. He comes to discover that Harting had once been a war crime investigator in Germany and he has been secretly using Chancery resources to continue investigating Karfeld's career as the war-time administrator of a Nazi laboratory that poisoned 31 half-Jews, crimes for which Karfeld had been investigated but for which he escaped responsibility. Harting is, in fact, hiding from Siebkron, who is aware of Karfeld's crimes and seeks to protect him from being exposed. To Turner's chagrin, Bradfield is unsympathetic to Harting's circumstances and uninterested in protecting him because he considers him a criminal and a political embarrassment.

Turner discovers that Harting recently learned Karfeld is immune from prosecution due to the statute of limitations. Turner deduces that a violent incident at a recent Karfeld rally, in which a mob stormed a British library and fatally assaulted the female librarian—revealed to be Harting's ex-girlfriend—occurred because Harting had attempted to shoot Karfeld from a window of the library. Turner believes Harting may try again to assassinate Karfeld at his next rally, which Turner and Bradfield attend.

The novel ends with Karfeld addressing the rally and delivering an anti-Western European, Nazi-apologist speech until violence erupts between his supporters and a group of socialist counter-protestors. In the ensuing chaos, Harting attempts to shoot Karfeld but misses; Karfeld's supporters kill him as Turner rushes to his aid. As Turner watches helplessly, they search his body for the last pieces of incriminating evidence against Karfeld.

== Major characters ==
- Rawley Bradfield – Head of Chancery at the British Embassy in Bonn
- Leo Harting – long-term temporary employee at the British Embassy
- Alan Turner – British Foreign Office official
- Ludwig Siebkron – German Interior Ministry official
- Klaus Karfeld – German industrialist and politician

== Writing ==
Le Carré was initially unhappy with the book, later writing in the foreword to a 1991 reprinting that the novel "is printed with aversion in my memory". In the same foreword, le Carré revealed that he based the hostile, reactionary Turner on himself, admitting that he was going through a nervous breakdown at the time of writing due to the dissolution of his marriage; he would ultimately stop work on the book for a period to deal with his personal life before returning to it later. For a period, he believed the book would be his farewell to espionage fiction, following it up with a semi-autobiographical literary novel he intended to restart his career, The Naïve and Sentimental Lover. In retrospect, he wrote there that "the novel is not the eyesore I always imagine it to be".

Le Carré said that his intention was "to write something close to a black comedy about British political manners, and yet the result was widely perceived to be ferociously anti-German". He said that he wanted to write "an informed nightmare, not an accurate prophecy. My aim was to tell what I might best call a political ghost story". Harting is the ghost, Turner is his exorcist and Bradfield is the owner of the haunted house. While most of the characters were original creations, le Carré wrote that Leo was directly based on a man he knew during his diplomatic service whom he referred to only as "Herr Junger," an "embassy fixer" who was able to acquire discount goods for the staff using his various contacts in other embassies.

Le Carré created the first drafts of the book in Vienna, where Simon Wiesenthal helped him with Karfeld's background.

With the book in a confused state of rewriting, Jane Eustace gave le Carré significant help with rescuing it. Soon after publication, he wrote "When the book was in shreds, it was she who helped me piece it together and make something of it. I find her compassionate, understanding, and remarkably intelligent". After Le Carré divorced his first wife in 1971, Eustace became his second.

== Allusions/references to actual events ==
- David Cornwell (John le Carré) worked as an intelligence officer for MI6 under diplomatic cover as the 'Second Secretary' of the British embassy in Bonn, during the period depicted in this novel.
- At the time of publication there were worries that the extreme right was rebuilding in West Germany, particularly with the success of the far-right National Democratic Party in various state and municipal elections after its founding.
- The West German Chancellor Kurt Georg Kiesinger was, like Karfeld, a former Nazi, who had joined the Nazi Party in 1933. Although Kiesinger was cleared of war crimes by the denazification courts, radical groups such as the Red Army Faction argued that an informal but powerful network of ex-Nazis, including Kiesinger, controlled the country.
- Real locations in Bonn such as the British Embassy feature prominently.

== Release details ==
- 1968, UK, William Heinemann, ISBN 0-434-10930-4, October 1968, Hardback
- 1970, UK, Pan, ISBN 0-330-02306-3, 3 July 1970, Paperback

== Dramatisation ==
- Serialised in seven episodes for BBC Radio 4, broadcast in Summer 1982.
