= Simon Langton (television director) =

English television director and producer

Simon Langton (born 5 November 1941 in Amersham, Buckinghamshire) is an English television director and producer. He is the son of David Langton, the actor who played Richard Bellamy in Upstairs, Downstairs.

After he had directed many TV drama series and serials during the 1970s, his version of the John le Carré novel Smiley's People (1982, adapted by John Hopkins) was nominated for both a BAFTA Award in the UK, and an Emmy Award in the US. He also received a BAFTA nomination for the series Mother Love (1989), starring Diana Rigg.

He is perhaps best known for directing the adaptation of Pride and Prejudice (1995) starring Jennifer Ehle and Colin Firth, for which he was again nominated for a BAFTA. He directed episodes of Rosemary and Thyme and Midsomer Murders.

== Filmography ==
TV movies

- The Widowing of Mrs. Holroyd (1976)
- The Lost Honor of Kathryn Beck (1984)
- Act of Passion (1984)
- Anna Karenina (1985)
- Casanova (1987)
- Laguna Heat (1987)
- Forbidden Territory: Stanley's Search for Livingstone (1997)
- Nancherrow (1999)

Feature film

- The Whistle Blower (1986)

TV series

- Supernatural (1977) (4 episodes)

Miniseries

- Rebecca (1979)
- Thérèse Raquin (1980)
- Smiley's People (1982)
- I Remember Nelson (1982)
- Mother Love (1989)
- Headhunters (1994)
- The Cinder Path (1994)
- Pride and Prejudice (1995)
