= Anthony Bate =

English actor (1927–2012)

- Bate in the television series Intimate Strangers
- Born: 31 August 1927; Stourbridge, Worcestershire, England
- Died: 19 June 2012 (aged 84); Newport, Isle of Wight, England
- Education: King Edward VI School, Stourbridge; Central School of Speech and Drama
- Occupation: Actor
- Years active: 1953–2005
- Known for: Tinker Tailor Soldier Spy; Smiley's People
- Spouse: Diana Fay Watson (m. 1954)
- Children: 2

Anthony Bate (31 August 1927 – 19 June 2012) was an English actor.

He is possibly best known for his role as Oliver Lacon in the BBC television adaptations of the John le Carré novels Tinker Tailor Soldier Spy and Smiley's People, and his role as Bret Renssalaer in Len Deighton's trilogy Game, Set and Match.

Bate's other credits include Dixon of Dock Green, The Saint, The Avengers, Prime Suspect, Inspector Morse, A Touch of Frost and Midsomer Murders.

== Early life ==
Bate was born the third son of Isle of Wight hoteliers Hubert George Cookson Bate (son of George Harry Bate, a hairdresser and trichologist, of Stourbridge; died 1986) and Cecile Marjorie Canadine (died 1973). Bate was educated at King Edward VI School, Stourbridge, and trained at the Central School of Speech and Drama (gold medal). During his National Service he served with the Royal Navy Volunteer Reserve from 1945 to 1947.

== Theatre ==
From his professional theatre debut in 1953, Bate's theatre roles include his first West End appearance in Inherit the Wind (St Martin's, 1960), Treasure Island (Mermaid, 1960), Happy Family (Hampstead, 1966), Much Ado About Nothing and Silence (RSC Aldwych, 1969), Find Your Way Home (Open Space Theatre, 1970), Eden End (tour, 1972), Economic Necessity (Haymarket Leicester, 1973), Getting Away with Murder (Comedy, 1976), Shadow Box (Cambridge, 1979), The Old Jest (tour, 1980), A Flea in her Ear (Plymouth Theatre Co, 1980), Little Lies (Wyndhams, 1983), Master Class (tour, 1984), The Deep Blue Sea (Theatre Royal Haymarket, 1988), and Relative Values (Chichester Festival Theatre and Savoy, 1993–1994).

== Television ==
Bate's first television appearance was in 1955 and from then he appeared as James in Pinter's The Collection, Rogojin in The Idiot, MacDuff in Macbeth, Ray Underwood in the 1963 Edgar Wallace Mysteries film The Set Up, Javert in Les Misérables, the title role in Grady (a trilogy), T H Huxley in Darwin's Bulldog, Nikolai in Fathers and Sons, Creon in King Oedipus, Victor Hugo in Ego Hugo, Harry Paynter in Intimate Strangers, The Dutch Train Hijack 1976, Dr Dorn in The Seagull (1977), Kim Philby in Philby, Burgess and Maclean (1977, nominated Best Actor Monte Carlo Festival 1978), An Englishman's Castle (1978), the title role in The Trial of Uri Urlov (1978), Tinker Tailor Soldier Spy (1978), Crime and Punishment (1979), 'Tis Pity She's a Whore (1980), The Human Crocodile (1980), Fanny by Gaslight (1981), Smiley's People (1982), A Woman Called Golda (with Ingrid Bergman, 1982), J A D Ingres in Artists and Models (1983), Shackleton, Game, Set and Match (TV mini-series, 1988), War and Remembrance (1988), Inspector Morse (Dr Crowther in "Last Bus to Woodstock", 1988), Countdown to War (1989), Agatha Christie's Poirot (1990), Medics (1991 and 1992), Prime Suspect (1994), Rebecca (1996), Bodyguards (1996), A Touch of Frost (1997), Silent Witness (1997) and Midsomer Murders (2000). He also appeared in Spindoe and Beasts.

== Films ==
Bate's film credits include Dentist in the Chair (1960), Dentist on the Job (1961), Payroll (1961), A Prize of Arms (1962), Act of Murder (1964), Ghost Story (1974), Give My Regards to Broad Street (1984), Eminent Domain (1990) and Nowhere in Africa (2001, winner Oscar for Best Film in a Foreign Language). He was a member of BAFTA from 1985.

== Personal life ==
On 22 May 1954, he married Diana Fay Watson, the daughter of Kenneth Alfred Charles Caws Watson (died 29 October 1940), of Seaview, Isle of Wight. His two sons are Gavin Watson Bate (born 1961) and Mark Hewitt Bate (born 1963).

== Death ==
Bate died at St. Mary's Hospital, Isle of Wight, on 19 June 2012 at the age of 84, after a brief illness. He had been rushed into the hospital on 17 June because of his condition. He was survived by his wife, Diana, and his two children.
