= Tinker Tailor Soldier Spy (TV series) =

1979 BBC programme based on John le Carré's spy novel

- Opening title
- Genre: Spy; Drama
- Based on: Tinker Tailor Soldier Spy by John le Carré
- Written by: Arthur Hopcraft
- Directed by: John Irvin
- Starring: Alec Guinness; Michael Jayston; Anthony Bate; George Sewell
- Music by: Geoffrey Burgon
- Country of origin: United Kingdom
- Original language: English
- No. of episodes: 7 (original)

Production
- Producer: Jonathan Powell
- Cinematography: Tony Pierce-Roberts
- Editors: Chris Wimble; Clare Douglas
- Running time: UK: 315 min; US: 290 min
- Production company: BBC Television

Original release
- Network: BBC2
- Release: 10 September – 22 October 1979

Related
- Smiley's People

Tinker Tailor Soldier Spy is a 1979 British spy drama television serial from the BBC, based upon John le Carré's 1974 novel. It is directed by John Irvin and produced by Jonathan Powell, written for the screen by Arthur Hopcraft. It stars Alec Guinness as George Smiley, along with Alexander Knox, Ian Richardson, Michael Jayston, Bernard Hepton, Anthony Bate, Ian Bannen, George Sewell, Michael Aldridge and Beryl Reid.

The serial was originally shown in the United Kingdom in seven installments, aired from 10 September to 22 October 1979 on BBC Two. In the United States, the serial was re-edited from the original seven episodes to fit into six episodes, beginning on 29 September 1980 as a part of PBS's Great Performances.

Tinker Tailor Soldier Spy received widespread acclaim from both critics and audiences. It won BAFTA TV Awards for Best Actor (for Guinness) and Best Film Cameraman (for Tony Pierce-Roberts), with seven other nominations. In the United States, the serial was nominated for a Outstanding Limited Series. It was followed by Smiley's People in 1982.

== Plot ==
George Smiley is deputy to the head of the British Secret Intelligence Service, known as the Circus because of its headquarters at Cambridge Circus in London. Smiley is forced into retirement in the wake of Operation Testify, a failed spy mission in Czechoslovakia. The Chief of the Circus, known only as Control, sent veteran agent Jim Prideaux to meet a Czechoslovak general who supposedly had information identifying a deep-cover Soviet spy planted in the highest echelons of the SIS. The mission was a trap, and Prideaux was shot in the back, captured and tortured by the Soviets. Control is disgraced by Testify and replaced by his rival Percy Alleline.

Control's obsession with the possibility of a Soviet mole at the Circus is not shared by others in the organisation, who insist that any leaks and failures at the Circus are due to Control's incompetence. The new leadership team believes that they have a mole, code-named Merlin, working for them in Moscow Centre, the KGB headquarters, passing them secrets in an operation code-named Witchcraft. Others in the British and American intelligence communities are impressed with the information produced by Witchcraft, and feel Alleline and his team represent a refreshing change from Control.

More than a year after Testify and the shake-up at the Circus, Ricki Tarr, a British agent gone missing in Lisbon, turns up in England with new evidence backing up Control's theory of a mole at the Circus. During a routine mission Tarr had been approached by Irina, a low-level Soviet agent who wanted to use the identity of the mole as leverage in her personal defection. When Tarr informs the Circus of Irina's offer, she is abducted by the KGB and spirited back to Russia. Tarr, convinced he had been betrayed by the mole Irina was going to identify, fears he will be murdered and returns to London in secret to contact Oliver Lacon, the civil servant who liases between the Circus and the British Cabinet.

Before his ousting, Control had identified five high ranking suspects: Roy Bland, Toby Esterhase, Bill Haydon, Percy Alleline and Smiley. Knowing the Soviet spy is highly placed in the Circus, Lacon can't trust the Circus to uncover the mole or even allow its personnel to know of the investigation. Smiley, who had been fired along with Control while Control's other four suspects were promoted, is recalled by Lacon and given instructions to expose the mole. With the help of his protégé, Peter Guillam, who is still in the Circus, Smiley begins a secret investigation into Operation Testify, believing it will lead him to the identity of the mole, whom Moscow Centre has given the cover name Gerald.

Smiley learns that Operation Witchcraft uses a safehouse to meet with Aleksey Aleksandrovich Polyakov, a Soviet agent. Polyakov appears to hand over valuable intelligence material that is actually worthless, and the operation is a cover by which Gerald passes valuable material to Polyakov. Smiley forces Toby Esterhase to reveal the location of the safe house. Tarr is sent to Paris, where he sends a coded message to Alleline about "information crucial to the safeguarding of the Circus". This triggers an emergency meeting between Gerald and Polyakov at the safehouse, where Smiley and Guillam lie in wait.

The mole is revealed to be Bill Haydon. Haydon is debriefed by Smiley, but is killed by Jim Prideaux before he can be exchanged with the Soviets.

== Cast ==
- Alec Guinness as George Smiley ("Beggarman")
- Alexander Knox as Control
- Michael Jayston as Peter Guillam
- Anthony Bate as Oliver Lacon
- Bernard Hepton as Toby Esterhase ("Poorman")
- Ian Richardson as Bill Haydon ("Tailor")
- Ian Bannen as Jim Prideaux
- Hywel Bennett as Ricki Tarr
- Michael Aldridge as Percy Alleline ("Tinker")
- Terence Rigby as Roy Bland ("Soldier")
- George Sewell as Mendel
- Beryl Reid as Connie Sachs
- Joss Ackland as Jerry Westerby
- Siân Phillips as Ann Smiley
- Frank Moorey as Lauder Strickland
- Nigel Stock as Roddy Martindale
- John Standing as Sam Collins
- Thorley Walters as Tufty Thessinger
- John Wells as Headmaster
- Patrick Stewart as Karla
- Mandy Cuthbert as Molly Purcell
- Warren Clarke as Alwyn
- Joe Praml as Paul Skordeno
- Susan Kodicek as Irina
- Alec Sabin as Fawn
- Hilary Minster as Boris
- George Pravda as Aleksey Aleksandrovich Polyakov
- Duncan Jones as "Jumbo" Roach

== Episodes ==
No.	Title	Directed by	Written by	Original release date
1	"Return to the Circus"	John Irvin	Arthur Hopcraft	10 September 1979
2	"Tarr Tells His Story"	John Irvin	Arthur Hopcraft	17 September 1979
3	"Smiley Tracks the Mole"	John Irvin	Arthur Hopcraft	24 September 1979
4	"How It All Fits Together"	John Irvin	Arthur Hopcraft	1 October 1979
5	"Tinker Tailor"	John Irvin	Arthur Hopcraft	8 October 1979
6	"Smiley Sets a Trap"	John Irvin	Arthur Hopcraft	15 October 1979
7	"Flushing Out the Mole"	John Irvin	Arthur Hopcraft	22 October 1979

== Production ==
Shortly before filming began, Alec Guinness asked author John le Carré to introduce him to a real spy to aid him in preparing for his role. Le Carré invited Guinness to lunch with Sir Maurice Oldfield, who served as Chief of the British Intelligence Service from 1973 to 1978. During their meal, Guinness intently studied Oldfield for any mannerisms or quirks that he could use in his performance. When he saw Oldfield run his finger around the rim of his wine glass, he asked whether Oldfield was checking for poison—much to Oldfield's astonishment, as he was only checking how clean the glass was.

The series was shot on location in London, including some of the intelligence agency scenes which were shot in the BBC offices; in Glasgow for scenes in Czechoslovakia, at Oxford University, at Bredon School in Gloucestershire where the character Jim Prideaux was a master, and elsewhere.

== Music ==
The end credits music, a setting of "Nunc dimittis" ("Lord, now lettest thou thy servant depart in peace") from the Book of Common Prayer (1662), was composed by Geoffrey Burgon for organ, strings, trumpet, and treble; the score earned Burgon the Ivor Novello Award for 1979 and reached 56 on the UK Singles Chart. The treble on the original recording, Paul Phoenix, was a tenor in the King's Singers later in his career.

== Broadcast ==
The series was shown in the United Kingdom from 10 September to 22 October 1979, and in the United States beginning on 29 September 1980. In the US it was broadcast on PBS as part of its Great Performances series, and included commentary from Robert MacNeil and le Carré.

In the US, the syndicated broadcasts were re-edited from the seven original episodes broadcast in the UK to fit into six episodes. The overall running time is about the same.

== Reception ==
At the time of its release in the United States in 1980, Washington Post, television critic Tom Shales called the series "intricate and fascinating", and described its episodes as "six scintillating and delectable hours."

New York Times television critic John J. O'Connor called Guinness's performance "uncommonly brilliant." Guinness, he said, could "say more with a slight parting of his lips than most actors can say while shouting from the rafters." He pointed out that Guinness was superb in the role even though he was older and not as heavy as Smiley was described in the novel. O'Connor praised the supporting cast and said that Hopcroft's script was "tenaciously faithful to the spirit of the novel."

== Awards and honours ==
Award	Year	Category	Nominee(s)	Result	Ref.
British Academy Television Awards	1980	Best Drama Series or Serial	Jonathan Powell, John Irvin	Nominated	
British Academy Television Awards	1980	Best Actor	Alec Guinness	Won	
British Academy Television Awards	1980	Best Actress	Beryl Reid	Nominated	
British Academy Television Awards	1980	Best Design	Austen Spriggs	Nominated	
British Academy Television Craft Awards	1980	Best Costume Design	Joyce Mortlock	Nominated	
British Academy Television Craft Awards	1980	Best Film Cameramen	Tony Pierce-Roberts	Won	
British Academy Television Craft Awards	1980	Best Film Editor	Chris Wimble, Clare Douglas	Nominated	
British Academy Television Craft Awards	1980	Best Film Sound	Malcolm Webberley	Nominated	
British Academy Television Craft Awards	1980	Best Graphics	Doug Burd	Nominated	
Broadcasting Press Guild Awards	1980	Best Drama Series	—N/a	Won	
Broadcasting Press Guild Awards	1980	Best Actor	Alec Guinness	Won	
Primetime Emmy Awards	1981	Outstanding Limited Series	Jac Venza, Jonathan Powell, Samuel Paul	Nominated	

== Legacy ==
Writing in 2011, Guardian critic Toby Manning wrote that the series "is still unmatched in its evocation of the chilly, cynical cold war era".

In a retrospective review in The New York Times, Mike Hale lauded Guinness's performance, and cited the production's pacing versus current techniques, stating: "Audiences used to the pace of the modern TV crime or espionage drama will need to reorientate themselves." Retrospective reviewers favourably compared the series with the 2011 film version, also citing le Carré's praise of the original and referring to Guinness's performance.

Le Carré cited the series as his favourite filmed adaptation of his work, attributing this to his experience collaborating with Guinness.

== Home media ==
Tinker, Tailor, Soldier, Spy was released on VHS in 1991 (BBCV 4605) and 1999 (BBCV 6788). It was released on Region 2 DVD in 2003 (BBCDVD 1180), and in 2011 bundled with Smiley's People (BBCDVD 3535). A remastered Blu-ray edition was released in 2019 (BBCBD0465).

== See also ==
- Tinker, Tailor
