= TTSS =

The abbreviation TTSS may refer to:

- Tinker, Tailor, Soldier, Spy, a novel by John le Carré
  - Tinker Tailor Soldier Spy (miniseries), a 1979 miniseries based on the novel
  - Tinker Tailor Soldier Spy (film), a 2011 film based on the novel
- Type three secretion system, a protein appendage found in several gram-negative bacteria
