= Jim Prideaux =

Fictional character in the works of John le Carré

- George Smiley character
- First appearance: Tinker Tailor Soldier Spy
- Last appearance: Karla's Choice
- Created by: John le Carré

In-universe information
- Gender: Male
- Occupation: Spy
- Affiliation: The Circus
- Nationality: British

Jim Prideaux is a fictional character created by John le Carré. He plays a major role in Tinker Tailor Soldier Spy, and is a minor character in A Legacy of Spies and Karla's Choice. His career in British intelligence (called "The Circus" in Le Carré's books) spans from World War II to 1972, when it is cut short by a botched mission in the Czechoslovak Socialist Republic. This mission, known as "Operation Testify," is the inciting event for Tinker Tailor Soldier Spy.

== Fictional biography ==
Born to "parents in European banking" with a "small aristo" background Prideaux was raised abroad and attended Oxford. Smiley recalls that Jim was at first more athletically gifted than academically, but he came to excel in linguistics and was a polyglot. During his time at Oxford, Prideaux was befriended by Bill Haydon, a young Circus agent who recruited him to the organization. The two were lovers and remained close friends throughout their careers in the Circus.

Prideaux has a gruff demeanor, which Smiley likens to that of a soldier, and speaks in short, clipped sentences; this demeanor disguises an intelligent mind, and he is essentially kind, especially towards children. Following World War II, Prideaux briefly works as a teacher before rejoining the intelligence services. He works at the Circus for three decades, primarily in Czechoslovakia, and is head of the Balkans desk by 1960. By 1972, he has been transferred to the "scalp-hunters," a division of the Circus dedicated to more dangerous counterintelligence missions, especially involving coercion, violence, or assassinations.

In October 1972, Control, the head of the Circus, sends Prideaux on an off-the-books mission to Czechoslovakia, codename "Operation Testify." Control believes that the Circus has been infiltrated by a highly placed KGB mole, and sends Prideaux to Brno to interview a Czech general claiming to know the mole's identity. Though Prideaux later claims he did not believe the mole theory, he goes on the mission, and is shot and captured, creating an international scandal. "Testify" was a trap, meant to disgrace Control and discredit the Circus. While imprisoned, Prideaux is interrogated for several months by Karla.

After several months, Haydon arranges to have Prideaux repatriated to England. Prideaux is permanently disabled from the bullet to his back, and discharged from the Circus without any debriefing. He is given a gratuity and set up with a post as a supply teacher, teaching French at a remote prep school in Somerset.

A year after Testify, retired Circus agent George Smiley is tasked by Whitehall with identifying the Soviet mole. Tinker Tailor Soldier Spy alternates between Smiley's investigation and Prideaux's life as a schoolteacher, where he attempts to adjust to civilian life while dealing with the PTSD and injury from Operation Testify. He is well-liked by his students, who nickname him "Rhino." He is especially beloved by Bill Roach, an anxious, unpopular child of a broken home. Prideaux nicknames Roach "Jumbo" rather than referring to him by his given name.

In the final stage of his investigation, Smiley travels to the prep school to interview Prideaux about Operation Testify. He finds Prideaux leading a peaceful but uneasy life at the school, living in a self-maintained caravan on the school grounds. During Smiley's interview, Prideaux details the mission, the trap, and his months-long interrogation, but he vehemently denies Smiley's suggestion that he was set up or betrayed by anyone at the Circus—least of all by Haydon, his oldest, closest friend.

In the days following his conversation with Prideaux, Smiley has an instinctive "feeling" that he is being followed, but is unable to identify any particular watcher. Smiley proves that Haydon is indeed the mole. Once Haydon is arrested and interviewed, the British government arranges a prisoner exchange with the Soviet Union. The night before his scheduled transfer, however, Haydon is found dead on the prison grounds. His neck has been broken. The book implies that Prideaux, after following Smiley to the mole, killed Haydon himself.

In A Legacy of Spies, written over 40 years later, Circus retiree Peter Guillam visits Prideaux at the same school. Prideaux is still in intermittent contact with Smiley, and still living in the same caravan on the grounds. He tells Guillam that the school almost went under when the former headmaster, Thursgood, fled on a "moonlight flit with the school chef," taking all the tuition money with him; Prideaux, with help from Smiley and some parents, kept the school running. Mostly retired, he lives on the grounds and coaches junior rugby.

== Development ==
In his introduction to the 1991 edition of Tinker Tailor Soldier Spy, Le Carré wrote that an early prototype of the book began with a character who later evolved into Prideaux, "a solitary and embittered man living alone on a Cornish cliff, staring up at a single black car as it wove down the hillside towards him. [...] He had a limp, as Jim Prideaux has a limp in the version you are about to read, and like Jim he was a former British agent who had walked into a trap set for him by a traitor inside his own service." Originally, this character was to uncover the mole himself, rather than George Smiley, but Le Carré abandoned this concept and rewrote the story.

In creating Prideaux's character, Le Carré took inspiration from his own experiences as a schoolteacher. In a 1996 interview with The Paris Review, he elaborated further on the development of Prideaux, and his foil character, the student, Roach:

Jim Prideaux was a schoolmaster who had been terribly betrayed by a man he greatly loved in the British secret services. I taught quite a lot when I was young. Before I taught at Eton I taught at a school for disadvantaged kids. During that time I met a lot of the strange underlife of Brits who go into private-school teaching. There was a very good schoolmaster at one of the schools where I taught—a big, rugged fellow with a limp. I used to think that that was the outer shell for Jim. And in that story Jim was set against a little boy who was a watcher, a little spy fellow. In fact, that child was written into my life because I was a duty master one night at this school for disadvantaged kids, and somebody came to me and said, Please, Jameson is trying to kill himself. They took me to this stairwell in a big Victorian house, and there was a little kid standing on the banister at the top, with a marble floor forty feet below. Everyone was petrified. And I just went and scooped him up. He didn’t jump. And when we were alone I said, Why did you do that? He said, I just can’t do the routine. I can’t make my bed. I can never make it to class promptly. Everybody teases me. It was that little child in Tinker, Tailor, Soldier, Spy whom Jim Prideaux espoused; they make a common bond. I love people who can spot a victim, and Jim could because he was one himself.

== Portrayals ==
Prideaux was played by Ian Bannen in the 1979 television serial based on the novel. His portrayal is in keeping with the Prideaux of the book, a gruff military man who speaks in short sentences, but was considered a "serious disappointment" by author Le Carré. The series also shows the final encounter between Jim and Bill (Ian Richardson), including Prideaux's killing of Haydon by breaking his neck.

In the 2011 film adaptation, Prideaux was played by Mark Strong. This adaptation emphasizes Prideaux's linguistic and intellectual abilities. At the end of the film, rather than killing Haydon (Colin Firth) by breaking his neck, he shoots him with a rifle from a distance.

In the upcoming series Legacy of Spies, Prideaux is played by Joe Alwyn.
