= The Naïve and Sentimental Lover =

1971 novel by John le Carré

- First edition
- Author: John le Carré
- Cover artist: Tony Geddes
- Language: English
- Published: 1971 (Hodder & Stoughton)
- Publication place: United Kingdom
- Media type: Print (hardback and paperback)
- Pages: 416
- ISBN: 9780792710059 Hardcover
- Dewey Decimal: 823/.914 L456
- LC Class: PR6062.E33 L43 1971

The Naïve and Sentimental Lover is John le Carré's sixth novel, published in 1971. It is one of only two non-spy novels in his oeuvre, along with A Murder of Quality (1962).

== Background and plot ==
The novel follows Aldo Cassidy, a young entrepreneur. As the Penguin Random House webpage summarizes, Aldo soon meets a "writer whose first and only novel blazoned across the firmament twenty years earlier. The two develop a passionate friendship that draws Aldo—smitten also with his new friend’s luscious wife—into a life of reckless hedonism that threatens to consume them all." The story has autobiographical elements, as it is based on the author's relationship with James and Susan Kennaway following the breakdown of le Carré's first marriage. The novel was published in the year of his divorce from Ann Sharp, his first wife.

== Reception and legacy ==
Upon its release, the novel was poorly reviewed by critics. The New York Times book review felt that by abandoning the spy novel, le Carré was not playing to his strengths. They wrote that "it isn't that le Carré is out of his depth here, or that he has lost his way with apposite atmospherics and scene‐settings; it isn't that his prose has surrendered its characteristic irony and tough precision. It is rather that he has chosen to relinquish his fundamental perception, to unhand the lever that lifted his tales—the truth that in this world of gray little men, gray little men shake the world." In an interview in 1983, le Carré reflected on the novel's poor reception and how he responded in his career. He told The New York Times: "I thought, they [the negative reviewers] were right. And if you can do one thing well, stick with it." After the failure of this novel, he returned to the spy genre and his most famous character George Smiley with the acclaimed Tinker Tailor Soldier Spy and subsequent sequels in The Quest for Karla trilogy.
