= Absolute Friends =

2003 novel by John le Carré

- First edition
- Author: John le Carré
- Language: English
- Genre: Spy fiction
- Publisher: Hodder & Stoughton
- Publication date: 2003
- Publication place: United Kingdom
- Media type: Print (hardback and paperback)
- Pages: 383
- ISBN: 0-340-83287-8
- OCLC: 53124233
- Dewey Decimal: 823/.914 22
- LC Class: PR6062.E33 A65 2004

Absolute Friends is an espionage novel by British writer John le Carré, published in December 2003.

== Plot summary ==
The book tells the story of Ted Mundy, the Pakistan-born son of a British army officer, who as a student becomes proficient in the German language. He joins a 1960s-era student protest group in West Berlin and becomes a lifelong friend of a West German student anarchist named Sasha. Having been brutally beaten by West Berlin police and ejected from Germany, Mundy fails at several careers; as a teacher at an English prep school, as a newspaper reporter, a radio interviewer, and a novelist.

Eventually Mundy obtains a position with the British Council. Meanwhile, Sasha has defected to East Germany to become a member of the notorious Stasi secret police. On a trip to East Germany with a youth theatre group, Mundy and Sasha meet again. By this time Sasha has become totally disillusioned with the Communist Bloc and enlists the naïve Mundy to become a double agent. Sasha has access to state secrets and he recruits Mundy to help him smuggle them out of East Germany and deliver them to MI6, the British Secret Service. Their efforts contribute to the collapse of the GDR and eventual destruction of the Berlin Wall. After the wall comes down, Sasha asks Mundy to continue engaging in geopolitics with him, but Mundy – whose marriage has collapsed as a result of his secret life – refuses, and the two part ways. In the ensuing decade, Mundy moves to Germany and becomes a tour guide at Linderhof Palace, begins dating a Turkish refugee, and considers converting to Islam to marry her and help raise her son.

Following 9/11, Sasha resurfaces to tell Mundy that he's become involved in an organization to combat American military and industrial globalization. Fearing that Sasha has been radicalized, Mundy is relieved to discover that he in fact wants Mundy to help him set up a Socialist think-tank that will be financed by a Russian oligarch with left-leaning sympathies. Initially excited to participate, Mundy becomes skeptical when he learns that he and Sasha's former CIA contact is somehow involved in the scheme. Going to the schoolhouse one night, Mundy realizes too late that the boxes of books he and Sasha have been receiving in fact contain bomb-making materials and military grade weaponry; he and an arriving Sasha are both shot to death by a waiting American strike force. After their deaths, Sasha's past with the Stasi and Mundy's Islamic sympathies are used by the CIA and right-leaning American press outlets to portray them as terrorists "with connections to Al-Qaeda", in efforts to convince the German government to support the United States in its war on terror. After Mundy's death, Amory, his controller from the British intelligence service during his espionage years, tries to publicize the truth, but slander by the British government results in his story being totally discredited. Mundy's girlfriend and her son are deported, and Germany enters the war on terror; per their wills, Mundy and Sasha are each buried beside their mothers in their respective home countries.

== Characters ==
- Ted Mundy: The student activist, British spy and naïve ideologue.
- Sasha: His "Absolute friend"
- The Major: Mundy's alcoholic father
- Kate: Mundy's ex-wife
- Zara: Mundy's Turkish girlfriend.
- Mustafa: Zara's 11-year-old son
- Nicholas Amory: Mundy's MI6 case officer
- Jay O'Rourke: Amory's CIA counterpart
