= Peter Guillam =

Fictional intelligence officer

- George Smiley character
- First appearance: Call for the Dead
- Last appearance: Karla's Choice
- Created by: John le Carré

In-universe information
- Gender: Male
- Occupation: Intelligence agent
- Affiliation: The Circus
- Spouse: Marie-Clare
- Nationality: French; British

Pierre Guillame, better known by the anglicised form Peter Guillam, is a fictional character in John le Carré's series of espionage novels. He first appears in Call for the Dead. He is the trusted right-hand man of George Smiley, the protagonist of many of le Carre's novels, and is often the person Smiley turns to for assistance when he fears he cannot trust his peers or subordinates.

== Character ==
Guillam is half-French and half-English, and comes from a family that has worked for The Circus (le Carre's name for MI6) for generations. Although Call for the Dead indicates that he served in the Second World War, the later books in the series indicate that he was born around 1933. Although he has done observational "field work" in the past and recruited spies that report to him, Guillam himself is uncomfortable with getting personally involved in spying operations, preferring an administrative role. His hands-off approach to spy work places him on the periphery of the numerous cliques and rivalries that form within the Circus, allowing him to survive multiple bureaucratic shakeups that occur throughout the 1960s and 1970s; nevertheless, he retains a secret loyalty to George Smiley, who functions as his mentor. He constantly finds himself reassigned to divisions and assignments considered mediocre or undesirable, including running the Scalphunters, the division of the Circus responsible for espionage operations requiring violence or assassinations. Guillam goes through a number of failed relationships, including an affair with a married musician twenty years his junior.

== In the novels ==
=== Call For the Dead ===
Guillam first appears as a minor character in Call for the Dead. He is described as having been recruited and trained by Smiley during the Second World War. In the aftermath of the apparent suicide of a suspected communist whom Smiley had previously exonerated, Smiley quits the Circus in order to conduct his own private investigation, relying on Guillam to provide him inside information pertinent to the case. He appears again in a minor role in The Spy Who Came in From the Cold, again in the role of Smiley's assistant.

=== Tinker Tailor Soldier Spy ===
Guillam is a major character in Tinker Tailor Soldier Spy, which retcons the chronology of Call for the Dead to make Guillam only forty in 1973. At the outset of the book, the failure of a major operation called "Testify" has resulted in Smiley and the former head of the Circus, Control, being fired. Guillam survives the purge of personnel loyal to Smiley, but is demoted to the head of the Brixton "scalphunters", fieldmen used in operations that require physical action and/or violence. The position is seen as one of the least desirable in the Circus, described humorously by Smiley as "cosh and carry". One of Guillam's agents, Ricki Tarr, inadvertently learns that the failure of Operation Testify—and Smiley's subsequent termination from the Circus—was due to the presence of a mole in the highest echelons of British intelligence. When contacted by Tarr and unsure of whom to trust, he goes to senior civil servant Oliver Lacon and, acting as his link man, Guillam facilitates Smiley's secret return from retirement in order to conduct a surreptitious investigation into the identity of the mole. Guillam is motivated not only by his loyalty to Smiley but also because, as a result of the mole's actions, a network of secret agents he ran in the former French North Africa were identified and executed. Guillam acts as Smiley's man on the inside in the investigation, which involves his stealing files from the Circus Registry at Smiley's request. Over the course of the novel, Guillam grows progressively paranoid and anxious regarding the investigation, at one point doubting the veracity of Tarr's allegations. When the mole is finally identified as Bill Haydon, Guillam loses his temper and physically attacks him, having to be restrained by the other men in the room.

=== The Honourable Schoolboy ===
Reappearing in The Honourable Schoolboy, Guillam is brought into Smiley's "inner circle" in the "post-Fall" Circus, along with Connie Sachs and "China watcher" Doc di Salis, as they investigate a Soviet "gold seam" in Hong Kong. Guillam begins to suspect that the operation is being undermined by their nominal allies in the CIA, in cooperation with certain elements of the British government. Though the operation is a success, his suspicions are proven correct when Smiley is removed from head of the Circus, and Guillam himself is demoted once again to the Brixton outstation.

=== Smiley's People ===
By the time of the events in Smiley's People (the third book in the Karla trilogy) Guillam is married to a young Frenchwoman called Marie-Clare and is head of Circus operations in Paris, though this too is considered to be a minor post.

=== The Secret Pilgrim ===
In The Secret Pilgrim Guillam appears as the Head of Secretariat for Leonard Burr, the chief of the Service, but their working relationship is conflicted. Burr describes Guillam as "a thoroughly idle officer", while Guillam says of Burr, "Bloody man seems to expect me to work in my sleep." Guillam is replaced by Ned, the protagonist of the novel.

=== A Legacy of Spies ===
Guillam is the protagonist and narrator of the events described in A Legacy of Spies, which greatly expand the scope of his involvement in The Spy Who Came in From the Cold.

== In other media ==
=== Television ===
In the 1979 BBC miniseries of Tinker Tailor Soldier Spy, Guillam was portrayed by Michael Jayston. In 1982, the followup adaptation of Smiley's People featured Michael Byrne in the role due to Jayston's unavailability.

Guillam will be played by Jake Dunn in Legacy of Spies.

=== Radio ===
Douglas Blackwell voiced Guillam for BBC Radio in the 1977 adaptation of Call for the Dead, the 1988 dramatisation of Tinker Tailor Soldier Spyand the 1991 version of Smiley's People.

John Rowe portrayed the role in The Honourable Schoolboy in 1983.

In BBC Radio's 2009/10 adaptation of the novel, Guillam was played by Ewan Bailey.

=== Film ===
In the 2011 film version of Tinker Tailor Soldier Spy, Guillam is played by Benedict Cumberbatch. The character is portrayed as homosexual in the film (a departure from the novels), and as making the painful decision to break up with his boyfriend.
