= Smiley's People =

1979 novel by John le Carré

- First edition
- Author: John le Carré
- Cover artist: Stephen Cornwell
- Language: English
- Series: The Quest for Karla
- Genre: Spy fiction
- Publisher: Hodder & Stoughton (UK)
- Publication date: November 1979
- Publication place: United Kingdom
- Media type: Print (hardback & paperback)
- Pages: 384 (hardback edition)
- ISBN: 0-340-24704-5 (UK hardback edition)
- OCLC: 6102346
- Preceded by: The Honourable Schoolboy

Smiley's People is a 1979 spy novel by John le Carré. The novel features a British master-spy George Smiley. It is the third and final novel of the "Karla Trilogy", following Tinker Tailor Soldier Spy and The Honourable Schoolboy. George Smiley is called out of retirement to investigate the death of one of his old agents: a former Soviet general, the head of an Estonian émigré organisation based in London. Smiley learns the general had discovered information that will lead to a final confrontation with Smiley's nemesis, the Soviet spymaster Karla.

== Plot ==
Maria Ostrakova is a Soviet émigrée in Paris. She is told by a Soviet agent calling himself "Kursky" that her daughter Alexandra, whom she was forced to leave behind, may be permitted to join her. Maria applies for an exit permit for her daughter. Hearing nothing more, she writes to General Vladimir, a former Soviet general and British agent, for help. Vladimir realises that Maria was used to provide a false identity for an unknown young woman, a ploy associated with KGB spymaster Karla, and that this is probably an unofficial operation.

Vladimir contacts Toby Esterhase, his old handler in the Circus, but Esterhase, now retired, refuses to help. Next Vladimir sends a confidant, Otto Leipzig, to Paris to interview Maria, who identifies "Kursky" in a photograph. Vladimir contacts the Circus again and insists on speaking to his former case officer, George Smiley, who is also retired. The Circus personnel are sceptical and uncooperative. Meanwhile, Vladimir is betrayed to Karla and assassinated on Hampstead Heath while on his way to meet a junior Circus contact.

Circus head Saul Enderby and Civil Service undersecretary Oliver Lacon, wanting to bury the matter quickly to protect the Circus from scandal, recall Smiley from retirement. Smiley takes Vladimir's claims seriously and investigates. He recovers a second letter from Maria, who fears for her life. Near the site where Vladimir was killed, he discovers the negative of a compromising photograph of Leipzig and another man with prostitutes. Smiley identifies the second man as Oleg Kirov and then consults dying former Circus researcher Connie Sachs who recounts rumours that Karla had a daughter by a mistress whom he had later sent to the Gulag. The daughter, Tatiana, was unstable and was confined to a mental institution.

Smiley flies to Hamburg and tracks down Claus Kretzschmar, an old associate of Leipzig and owner of the night club where the photograph was taken. He finds that Leipzig has been murdered by Karla's agents but manages to locate a recognition sign, in return for which Kretzschmar gives Smiley tape recordings of Leipzig and Kirov. Smiley hastens to Paris where, with help from his old colleague Peter Guillam, he gets Maria to safety before Soviet agents can murder her too. He also learns that Kirov has been summoned to Moscow and probably killed for his indiscretions.

The transcribed tape of Kirov's confession to Leipzig shows that Karla is secretly diverting funds to a Swiss bank account using a commercial attaché named Grigoriev, of the Soviet Embassy in Bern. The money is used for the care of Karla's daughter, who has been committed to a Swiss psychiatric sanatorium under the faked citizenship papers of Maria's daughter. Smiley explains to Enderby that they may be able to blackmail Karla and force him to defect. Enderby authorises Smiley to mount an operation to secure the evidence from Grigoriev, but makes clear to Smiley that he will disavow him if the mission fails.

Smiley and Esterhase set up a covert team in Bern to keep Grigoriev under observation. They soon obtain evidence of his unofficial handling of funds for Karla and of an affair with an Embassy secretary. Smiley presents Grigoriev with the choice of cooperating or being reported to the Swiss authorities and, later, Karla. Grigoriev quickly confesses all he knows of the arrangements regarding Alexandra's care and of the weekly visits he makes to her. Among her "symptoms" is her insistence that she is actually called Tatiana and is the daughter of a powerful man who can make people disappear. Smiley writes a letter to Karla, which Grigoriev passes on instead of his usual report on Alexandra's treatment. The letter details Karla's illegal activities and offers him defection to the West and protection for Tatiana, or elimination by his rivals in Moscow Centre.

In a final scene, Karla, posing as a labourer, defects using one of the bridge crossings between East and West Berlin. Before giving himself up to the waiting Western agents, Karla stops and lights a cigarette. As he passes near Smiley he drops a gold cigarette lighter, a gift to George from his wife Ann, that Karla purloined from Smiley 20 years earlier in a Delhi prison. Smiley is sickened at having to use Karla's methods against him and does not pick up the lighter.

== Characters ==
- Maria Andreyevna Ostrakova – a Russian émigrée in Paris
- Oleg Kirov alias Oleg Kursky – an agent deputed to find a suitable legend for Karla's daughter
- General Vladimir – Estonian émigré, former Soviet general, now a British spy
- Otto Leipzig – "The Magician", Estonian small-time crook who works with Vladimir
- George Smiley – retired, former Acting Chief of British intelligence service, "the Circus".
- Peter Guillam – Smiley's former lieutenant, now head of the British Intelligence section in the Paris embassy
- Connie Sachs – retired former analyst, now terminally ill in her Oxford "dacha"
- Hilary – Former Circus secretary and Connie Sachs' lover
- Sir Oliver Lacon – Whitehall's Head Prefect to the intelligence service, aka Cabinet Office factotum
- Nigel Mostyn – young intelligence officer who took Vladimir's calls to the Circus
- Lauder Strickland – Circus fixer and Head of Personnel
- Karla – Chief of the Thirteenth Directorate within Soviet Intelligence
- Sir Saul Enderby – Chief of The Circus
- Sam Collins – Current Head of Operations and Enderby's underling
- William (Villem) Craven – long-distance lorry driver and son of a deceased Estonian émigré who performs a courier job for Vladimir
- Mikhel – Vladimir's émigré friend and former aide-de-camp at the Free Baltic Library in Bloomsbury
- Elvira – Mikhel's wife
- Toby Esterhase – formerly head of the Circus's "Lamplighter" section, now a dubious art gallery owner
- Claus Kretzschmar – Otto Leipzig's old associate, owner of a seedy night club in Hamburg
- Grigoriev – Soviet bureaucrat in Bern
- Krassky – Moscow courier who handles correspondence between Grigoriev and Karla
- Alexandra – Karla's schizophrenic daughter
- Mother Felicity – mother superior of the psychiatric facility in Thun

== Analysis ==
David Cornwell (a.k.a. John le Carré) writes out of his experience as an intelligence officer for both MI5 and the SIS (MI6). The character General Vladimir was partly modelled on Colonel Alfons Rebane, an Estonian émigré who led the Estonian portion of SIS's Operation Jungle in the 1950s.

One review speaks of the book's "purposefully quiet, slow, downright claustrophobic austerity", through which emerges "perhaps the greatest variety, texture, and integrity ever bestowed upon a series character". Though short sections deal with the experience of a few other characters, the main focus of the novel is upon Smiley himself, using different sorts of narrative to do so.

Le Carré portrays all those involved in espionage, on whichever side, as flawed people, and it is their human weaknesses which interest him and keep the narrative moving. As one critic notes of this novel, "Ultimately Smiley's people are all those who choose humanity over ideology and individuals over institutions".

== Adaptations ==
=== Television ===
US DVD cover for the 1982 BBC series of Smiley's People.

Smiley's People was dramatized as a six-part serial for television for the BBC in 1982 as a sequel to Tinker Tailor Soldier Spy (1979), again starring Alec Guinness as George Smiley. The screenplay was written by John le Carré and John Hopkins and was directed by Simon Langton. Two versions of this series exist: 1) the six-part UK version, which expands upon several important aspects of Smiley's objectives and Enderby's endorsement of these, and 2) the six-part PBS version in which much of the "back story" had been excised, for time.

=== Radio ===
In 2009–2011, BBC Radio 4 also broadcast new dramatisations, by Shaun McKenna, of the eight George Smiley novels by John le Carré, featuring Simon Russell Beale as Smiley. Smiley's People was broadcast as three, one-hour episodes, from Thursday 20 October to Sunday 24 October 2011.

=== Possible cinema version ===
Following the success of the 2011 Tinker Tailor Soldier Spy, Gary Oldman, who plays George Smiley in the film, said "I think they're whispering now that they might do Smiley's People." Though nothing has yet come of the idea, it was still being refloated a decade later.
