= Alec Sabin =

British actor (born 1947)

- Born: John Charles Sabin; 28 August 1947 (age 79); Yorkshire, England
- Occupations: Actor; Journalist; Newsreader; Presenter; Voice Artist; Voice and Presentation Trainer

John Charles Sabin (born 28 August 1947), known as Alec Sabin, is an English actor, journalist, and presenter.

== Early life ==
Sabin spent his early years living in Kirk Ella and attending Pocklington School before going to read philosophy at Newcastle University. He started his career at Nottingham Playhouse, working as an assistant stage manager for a year before studying acting at Manchester University, acting in plays there as well as Gateway Theatre, Chester.

== Career ==
Not long after completing his drama course in 1971, Sabin was interviewed for the lead role in The Panel, an edition of anthology series ITV Playhouse. Not thinking he'd get the part, he took himself off to Sweden for a holiday when suddenly, Granada Television sent him six telegrams to Stockholm to inform him he had been cast. As a result, the actor rushed home and had bowling lessons a week before filming began, learning quickly in time to make his TV debut.

Further television appearances include Coronation Street, When the Boat Comes In, Tinker Tailor Soldier Spy, Maybury, Doctor Who, Bergerac, Call Me Mister and Birds of a Feather.

His theatre credits include the Royal Court Theatre and the Royal Shakespeare Company.

== Later life ==
By 1984, Sabin trained as a radio journalist, working in radio stations in the United Kingdom and Europe, as well as spending six months in Saudi Arabia. From 1990-2003, he was an announcer for BBC World Service.

Come the start of the new millennium, Sabin decided to become a voice and presentation trainer, training others with the skills they need to come across effectively in the media. His clients have included journalists, media students, advocates, doctors, corporate executives and even MPs. In addition, he wrote You're On!, a book to provide expert coaching on the subject, published in 2008.

== Partial filmography ==
- La 7ème compagnie au clair de lune (1977)
- S.O.S. Titanic (1979) - Crow's Nest Lookout: Frederick Fleet
- Antony and Cleopatra (1981) - Dercetas
- L'étincelle (1986) - Linsay
