= Rem Krassilnikov =

KGB general (1927–2003)

Major General Rem Krassilnikov (Krasilnikov, Russian: Рэм Сергеевич Красильников, (1927 - 2003) was a counter-intelligence officer of the Soviet Union's State Security Committee (KGB).

Krasilnikov was born in the family of a senior intelligence officer. His first name was taken from the Russian phrase Revolutsia mirovaya (Революция мировая -"World Revolution"). His wife's name was Ninel (Lenin spelled backwards).

During the 1980s, he was Chief of the First Department within the KGB's Second Chief Directorate, which placed him in charge of investigating and disrupting the operations of the Central Intelligence Agency in Moscow. Prior to that he headed up the Second Department of the SCD, which targeted the intelligence operations of the United Kingdom.

His book "KGB protiv MI6" ("KGB Against MI6") was a bestseller in Russia, and was reissued in 2020.

He died in March 2003.
