= The Honourable Schoolboy =

1977 novel by John le Carré

- First edition
- Author: John le Carré
- Language: English
- Series: The Quest for Karla
- Genre: Spy fiction
- Publisher: Hodder & Stoughton
- Publication date: 1977
- Publication place: United Kingdom
- Media type: Print (hardback & paperback)
- Pages: 533 (first edition, hardback)
- ISBN: 1-135-43056-X (first edition, hardback)
- LC Class: PR6062.E33 L43 1977
- Preceded by: Tinker Tailor Soldier Spy
- Followed by: Smiley's People

The Honourable Schoolboy is a 1977 spy novel by the English author John le Carré. It follows the spymaster George Smiley and his agents as they attempt to carry out a successful offensive espionage operation in Southeast Asia while rebuilding the Circus following the events of Tinker Tailor Soldier Spy.

The Honourable Schoolboy was followed by Smiley's People, which together with Tinker Tailor Soldier Spy, make up the "Karla Trilogy". All three novels were later published as an omnibus edition titled Smiley Versus Karla or The Quest for Karla in 1982.

== Plot ==
In 1974 George Smiley, the chief of the British secret intelligence service referred to as The Circus, is repairing the damage done to their operations by double agent Bill Haydon and looking for opportunities to target Karla, the Moscow Centre spymaster. The Circus is operating in a minimal way with most of its overseas facilities closed, its agents withdrawn and its operations under close political supervision. Smiley and analysts Connie Sachs and Doc di Salis look into investigations suppressed by Haydon and find that a historic investigation by Sam Collins of a money laundering operation in Laos could indicate a Moscow intelligence operation.

Through code and contacts already in Southeast Asia, Smiley dispatches Jerry Westerby, a newspaper reporter now living in Tuscany and occasional Circus operative, to Hong Kong under the guise of a sports journalist. Westerby traces the Soviet money to Drake Ko, a local businessman with links to both the criminal underworld and the British establishment. London establishes that Drake has a brother, Nelson, who is a high-ranking Chinese official and who has been spying on the Chinese for the Soviets.

Westerby, following up leads provided by Smiley in London, interviews Drake's English mistress Lizzie Worthington; undercover, Smiley had interviewed both her parents and the husband she had walked out on. Westerby discovers that Drake has been attempting to set up an illicit air route into China. Charlie Marshall and Tiny Ricardo (both pilots and smugglers) were approached by Drake to carry opium into China and return with a package. The flights were never completed, and Smiley surmises that the package was Nelson, who wished to defect from China. The money supplied by Moscow to Drake was intended for Nelson, to be accessed after he left China. Sam Collins, who had previously employed Lizzie in Laos as a minor field agent, is brought back into the Circus. Peter Guillam, Smiley's right-hand man, is suspicious of Collins, especially when he discovers Collins has been having extended meetings with Saul Enderby of the Foreign Office and Oliver Lacon, the permanent Cabinet secretary currently overseeing the Circus for the government. It is Enderby and Lacon who are supplying Smiley with the permissions and funds to run Westerby in Asia.

Nelson would be a prime intelligence source on both Soviet and Chinese capabilities, but political maneuverings between London and Washington hamper the investigation. It is finally agreed that the Circus will run the operation to capture Nelson and interrogate him afterwards, with all information shared with the United States. However, the Circus is given a limited time to carry out the operation and if Nelson is not captured by the time limit set, Drake Ko will be arrested and handed over to the US to face drug-related charges.

Smiley instructs Westerby to become more proactive in his investigations, referred to as "shaking the tree," to force Drake into moving forward more quickly with his plans to extract Nelson. Frost, the banker from whom Westerby had acquired Ko's identity, is brutally murdered; Westerby and his Hong Kong colleague Luke are shown the mutilated body. Westerby travels on his own through war-torn Cambodia, Vietnam and Thailand searching for Ricardo, who he eventually finds. Ricardo says he had been told Westerby was dead; Westerby ignores this and convinces Ricardo that he knows enough about Drake's attempts to bring opium into China to, under his sports writer's cover, blackmail Drake with Ricardo's help. Ricardo agrees but then tries to kill him with a car bomb as Westerby leaves his compound. On his return to Hong Kong, Westerby finds Luke murdered in his apartment; Drake's right-hand man, Tiu, has confused the two Westerners and murdered the wrong journalist. Westerby becomes increasingly stressed, guilty over Luke's death, and begins to obsess romantically over Lizzie.

Collins is instructed to blackmail Lizzie into bugging and informing on Drake. The Circus now has enough information to predict Drake's plan, which replicates his own escape from China decades earlier via sea. Westerby ignores orders to return to London and contacts Lizzie to profess his love. Smiley, along with Guillam and Circus and CIA operatives, arrives in Hong Kong to oversee the final stages of the operation. Smiley and Guillam catch Westerby at Lizzie's apartment, where Smiley has come to question Lizzie personally about Drake's plans. Smiley sends Guillam and body-man Fawn with Westerby to force him to board a plane out of Hong Kong, but Westerby assaults them and escapes. He then abducts Lizzie and, through questioning her, realizes Drake's plan. He and Lizzie travel to Po Toi island where Drake will meet with Nelson, and Westerby sends Lizzie back, arranging a time and place to meet with her that evening to escape the country. At the inlet where Drake intends to rendezvous with his brother, Westerby ambushes and warns Drake of Smiley's plans in an effort to make a deal which would protect Lizzie from reprisal. Just as the brothers reunite on the beach, CIA forces seize and abduct Nelson in a helicopter operation and Westerby is killed.

In the aftermath, it is revealed that the British government (Lacon, Collins and Enderby) have made a deal behind the scenes where the CIA will interrogate Nelson alone, freezing out Smiley and the Circus. The success of the operation yields top promotions for Enderby, who becomes Chief, and Collins, who becomes Head of Operations. Smiley and Connie Sachs are retired and most of the older generation of Circus personnel are moved on, even as Smiley is revered within the Circus for getting the agency back in the government's favour. In the aftermath of the debacle, Guillam contemplates the possibility that Smiley allowed the CIA to gain the upper hand so as to have himself removed as head of the Circus.

== Characters ==
The Circus

- The Hon. Jerry Westerby – a reporter and retired secret agent
- George Smiley – (temporary) chief of the Circus
- Peter Guillam – Smiley's right-hand man and his "cup-bearer"
- Fawn – "Scalphunter" and Smiley's bodyguard
- Connie Sachs – chief "Moscow-gazer", head of the Soviet research section
- Doc di Salis – chief "China-watcher", head of the Chinese research section
- Molly Meakin – junior research staff who eventually becomes Peter Guillam's lover
- Sam Collins – an "old Circus" field officer, formerly based in Vientiane, Laos. Work name: "Mellon"
- Stubbs – Westerby's managing editor at the newspaper

The Steering Committee (authorising further operations after the Ko bank account papers are obtained)

- Oliver Lacon – Permanent Secretary from the Cabinet Office
- Roddy Martindale – of the Foreign Office, a gossiping poseur
- Saul Enderby – of the Foreign Office, was ambassador to Indonesia; the chief pundit on South East Asia
- Wilbraham – of the Colonial Office
- Pretorius – of the Security Service
- The Welsh Hammer – a Treasury banker

Other characters

- Ann – Smiley's unfaithful wife
- Peter Worthington – the husband Elizabeth Worthington abandoned
- Mr. and Mrs. Pelling – Elizabeth Worthington's parents
- Mrs. Matthews – unofficial widow of Control
- Mr. Hibbert – as a missionary in Shanghai, knew Drake Ko and his brother Nelson
- Martello – CIA chief in London (COS London)
- Murphy – Martello's assistant
- Tiny Ricardo – Mexican frontman for Indocharter Vientiane S.A.
- Elizabeth Worthington, alias Lizzie, alias Lizzie Ricardo, alias Liese Worth – first, common-law wife of Tiny Ricardo; then, mistress of Drake Ko
- Charlie Marshall – sometime business partner of Tiny Ricardo
- Luke – Californian journalist in Hong Kong
- Big Moo – local journalistic jargon for the governor of Hong Kong
- Rockhurst ("The Rocker") – Superintendent of Police in Hong Kong
- William Craw – an ageing journalist working for the Circus, character based on Richard Hughes
- Jake Chiu – Luke's landlord, a real-estate entrepreneur
- Major Tufty Thesinger – Erstwhile SIS Head of Station, Hong Kong
- Frost – works at a Hong Kong bank, is blackmailed by Westerby
- Drake Ko – Hong Kong fat cat, receiving US$25K a month from the Soviets
- Nelson Ko – Drake's brother; also the name of Drake's deceased son
- Tiu – Ko's assistant
- Arpego – wealthy Filipino, friend of Ko
- Phoebe Wayfarer – half-English, half-Chinese agent for Brit Intel
- Sally Cale – art faker, illicit bullion dealer, occasional heroin trafficker, business partner or employee of Ko, introduced Liese to him
- Max Keller – veteran journalist whom Westerby meets in Phnom Penh
- Lorraine – American journalist in Phnom Penh

== Reception ==
In 1977, the novel won the Gold Dagger award for the best crime novel of the year and the James Tait Black Memorial Prize.

Some reviewers criticised the book's length including Clive James in the New York Review.

== Adaptations ==
Jonathan Powell, producer of Tinker, Tailor, Soldier, Spy (1979), said the BBC considered producing The Honourable Schoolboy but a production in Southeast Asia was considered prohibitively expensive and therefore the BBC instead adapted the third novel of the Karla Trilogy, Smiley's People (1979), which was broadcast in 1982.

In 1983 the BBC adapted The Honourable Schoolboy to radio; Martin Jarvis played Jerry Westerby and Peter Vaughan played George Smiley. A subsequent BBC radio adaptation, first broadcast in 2010 in the Classic Serial slot, featured Simon Russell Beale as George Smiley and Hugh Bonneville as Jerry Westerby, as part of Radio 4's year-long project to adapt all eight Smiley novels.
