= Jonathan Powell (producer) =

British television producer (born 1947)

- Born: Jonathan Leslie Powell; 25 April 1947 (age 79); Sittingbourne, Kent, England
- Education: Sherborne School
- Alma mater: University of East Anglia
- Occupations: Television producer, television executive, professor
- Years active: 1968–present
- Title: BBC Television Head of Drama (1985–1987); Controller of BBC1 (1987–1993)

Jonathan Leslie Powell (born 25 April 1947) is an English former television producer and executive. His senior positions in television included serving as the Head of BBC Drama Series and Serials and Controller of BBC1. He later became a professor and head of department of Media Arts at Royal Holloway, University of London.

== Biography ==
Powell was educated at Sherborne School and the University of East Anglia where he studied English literature. In 1968, he began working in television drama, producing programmes such as Crown Court. Working for the BBC, he produced several drama series during the 1970s and 1980s, including literary adaptations such as A Christmas Carol (1977), Wuthering Heights (1978), Testament of Youth (1979), Pride and Prejudice (1980), The Barchester Chronicles (1982) and The Old Men at the Zoo (1983). He was also the producer of Tinker Tailor Soldier Spy (1979) and its sequel Smiley's People (1982), both starring Alec Guinness as George Smiley.

In late 1983, he was made Head of Drama Series and Serials at BBC Television. He oversaw a period of change in BBC drama, with more original programmes being produced as well as classic adaptations, and more programmes being made on film rather than in the BBC TV studios on videotape. While Powell was heading BBC drama series, the soap operas EastEnders and Howards' Way were launched (both in 1985) and the medical drama Casualty (1986). In 1985, he and BBC1 controller Michael Grade attempted to cancel Doctor Who. In common with Grade, Powell had a low opinion of the series and especially despised its producer, John Nathan-Turner, whom, he later said, he wanted to "fuck off... or die, really". After an outcry from the series' fans and a tabloid campaign, this decision became an 18-month hiatus instead.

His most prominent television post came in 1987 when he succeeded Grade as the Controller of BBC1. While he was Controller, Doctor Who came to the end of its first run in 1989, although Head of Series Peter Cregeen cancelled the programme. Powell was responsible for commissioning Eldorado, a new soap opera that debuted in 1992. It lasted only a year, becoming critically and popularly regarded as a costly fiasco and an embarrassment for the BBC. He remained channel controller until 1993, when he left the BBC to join the independent company Carlton Television as Director of Drama and Co-Production.

After he retired from television, Powell became Head of the Department of Media Arts at Royal Holloway, University of London.

Media offices
Preceded by Graeme MacDonald	BBC Television Head of Drama; 1985–1987	Succeeded by Mark Shivas
Preceded by Michael Grade	Controller of BBC1; 1987–1993	Succeeded by Alan Yentob
