= Jake Dunn (actor) =

English actor

- Dunn in 2024
- Born: Jake Laurence Dunn; 2000 (age 25–26); Nottingham, England
- Education: Guildhall School of Music and Drama
- Years active: 2011–present

Jake Laurence Dunn (born 2000) is an English actor and filmmaker who began his career on YouTube. On television, he is known for his roles in the BBC series Get Even (2020) and What It Feels Like for a Girl (2025), the Disney+ series Renegade Nell (2024), and the Netflix series My Brilliant Career (2026).

== Early life and education ==
Dunn was born in Nottingham. Dunn joined the local Television Workshop. He went on to graduate from the Guildhall School of Music and Drama in 2022.

== Career ==
Beginning at age 11 and continuing into his teen years, Dunn had multiple YouTube channels, the most notable of which was radwolves, which he started in 2014. His content included sketches and the short films The Skin That Burns (2015) soundtracked by Tom Rosenthal, Paroxysm (2016) and The Complex (2017).

In 2020, Dunn had his first main television role as Christopher Beeman in the BBC iPlayer teen thriller Get Even. He reprised his role in an episode of the 2022 spinoff Rebel Cheer Squad. That same year, Dunn appeared in the Netflix series The Bastard Son & The Devil Himself as David and on stage in Kes at the Octagon Theatre, Bolton. The following year, he appeared in the second series of the Channel 4 comedy-drama Big Boys as Oscar.

Dunn appeared in the 2024 film William Tell as Stussi and played Thomas Blancheford in the Disney+ fantasy action series Renegade Nell. In 2025, he starred Liam in the 2025 BBC Three drama What It Feels Like for a Girl and Stanley Kowalski in A Streetcar Named Desire at the Crucible Theatre, Sheffield and made his Royal Opera House debut in a revival of the opera Last Days. He appeared in the Road revival at the Manchester Royal Exchange Theatre.

In 2026, Dunn has a role as Frank Hawden in the Netflix period drama My Brilliant Career. He has an upcoming role in the BBC adaptation of Legacy of Spies.

== Personal life ==
Dunn is in a relationship with actress Nicola Coughlan.

== Filmography ==
=== Film ===
Year	Title	Role	Notes
2015	The Skin That Burns		Short film; filmmaker
2015	Anhedonia	Zach	Short film
2016	Paroxysm		Short film; filmmaker
2016	Rubix	Hyena	Short film
2017	The Complex	—N/a	Short film; director, writer, editor
2019	Pleasure		Short film
2021	Muse	Frankie	
2024	William Tell	Stussi	

=== Television ===
Year	Title	Role	Notes
2017	The Internet Explorers		Web series, 3 episodes
2020	Get Even	Christopher Beeman	10 episodes
2022	Rebel Cheer Squad	Christopher Beeman	1 episode
2022	The Bastard Son & The Devil Himself	David	2 episodes
2023	Big Boys	Oscar	2 episodes
2024	Renegade Nell	Thomas Blancheford	6 episodes
2025	What It Feels Like for a Girl	Liam	5 episodes
2026	My Brilliant Career	Frank Hawden	6 episodes
TBA	Legacy of Spies	Peter Guillam	

=== Music video ===
Song	Year	Artist	Notes
"You Me at Six"	2021	Mixed Emotions	

== Stage ==
Year	Title	Role	Notes
2022	Kes	Billy Caspar	Octagon Theatre, Bolton
2025	A Streetcar Named Desire	Stanley Kowalski	Crucible Theatre, Sheffield
2025	Last Days	Blake	Royal Opera House, London
2026	Road	Joey	Royal Exchange, Manchester
