= Karla (character) =

Character by John le Carré

- George Smiley character
- First appearance: Tinker Tailor Soldier Spy
- Last appearance: Karla's Choice
- Created by: John le Carré

In-universe information
- Gender: Male
- Occupation: Intelligence officer
- Affiliation: KGB
- Nationality: Soviet

Karla is a recurring character in the works of John le Carré. A Soviet Intelligence officer, he is the head of the Thirteenth Directorate of Moscow Centre, le Carré's fictional version of the KGB, and the nemesis of le Carré's frequent protagonist George Smiley. Karla is nominally an unseen character who operates either through functionaries, hitmen, or by turning his enemies into double agents. Although other characters recount their past meetings with him, he only appears once during the events of the books. His real name is never revealed; instead, he takes his code name from that of the first spy network that he recruited.

Karla is the central antagonist in Tinker Tailor Soldier Spy, The Honourable Schoolboy, and Smiley's People, three novels which were later published as a single omnibus edition entitled Smiley Versus Karla, or The Quest for Karla in the US. He is also the title character in the first George Smiley continuation novel, Karla's Choice by Nick Harkaway, which is set some time before Tinker Tailor Soldier Spy.

In the BBC's television adaptations of both Tinker Tailor Soldier Spy and Smiley's People, Karla is played by British actor Patrick Stewart. Karla is seen only in one extended scene in each of the productions, and he does not speak in either.

== Fictional biography ==
Much of Karla's history is unconfirmed rumour, passed by Smiley to his protégé Peter Guillam. Among the rumours are:

- that his father was a professional intelligence officer, first for the Czarist Okhranka and later for the Bolshevist Cheka;
- that as a boy Karla worked as a kitchen boy on a train in occupied Siberia during the Russian Civil War;
- and that he was trained in espionage by "Berg" (a possible reference to the alias "Igor Konstantinovich Berg" used by Alexander Orlov), which Smiley compares to "being taught music by a great composer."

The first recorded Karla activities came during the Spanish Civil War, when he entered Nationalist territory in Spain posing as a White Russian journalist, and recruited a large number of German agents. The network was code-named "Karla", and the agent was later known only by that name. It was an outstanding achievement for such a young man and would become characteristic of Karla in the series.

He next appeared during the German invasion of Russia, running networks of partisans behind German lines. He discovered that his radio operator was a double agent for the Germans and so fed him false information that confused the Germans. According to one legend, at "Yelnya", Karla caused the Germans to shell their own forward line (presumably a reference to either the Yelnya Offensive during the first Battle of Smolensk, or the second Battle of Smolensk).

During his years as a field agent, Karla traveled in several countries, recruiting agents who would later become highly placed in their respective national regimes. He traveled to England in 1936 and 1941 and recruited Bill Haydon, code-named "Gerald", who eventually became the number-two man in the "Circus" (the British Secret Intelligence Service). At another time he recruited Nelson Ko, a high-ranking technocrat in the People's Republic of China (according to Connie Sachs, Karla was one of the few Soviets to predict the souring of Sino-Soviet relations).

In 1948, Karla was snagged in one of Stalin's random purges of the Soviet military and intelligence organisations and sent to prison in Siberia. His wife, a student from Leningrad, killed herself. However, Karla served his time and returned to intelligence work; the experience did nothing to dull his devotion to the communist cause.

In 1951, while setting up a network in California under the name "Gerstmann," Karla was unexpectedly caught when his radio codes were broken. Though he escaped the United States, he was arrested in New Delhi on his way back to Moscow. Smiley attempted to convince Karla to defect to the United Kingdom. Smiley felt that his case was ironclad: Karla's superiors at Moscow Centre were clearly looking to make him the scapegoat for the failure in California, and he was facing certain execution. Rather than giving in, Karla instead studied Smiley's words for signs of a hidden weakness, correctly deducing Smiley's insecurity regarding his unfaithful wife, Ann. Ultimately, Karla insisted on his return to the Soviet Union, taking with him Smiley's lighter (a gift from Ann) prior to departure. He returned to Moscow and somehow contrived to have his superiors dismissed and executed, with himself appointed in their place.

After being promoted away from active fieldwork, Karla sought to create his own independent apparatus inside Moscow Centre, believing that his personal agents were too important to leave to others. After several years, he finally became senior enough to create this apparatus (named in Smiley's People as the Thirteenth Directorate). He founded a special camp outside Moscow (towards Kiev) and trained a selection of handpicked men (usually ex-military officers) to act as handlers of his various moles.

== Role in the novels ==
=== Tinker Tailor Soldier Spy ===
Karla is first mentioned in Tinker Tailor Soldier Spy as the spymaster who recruited and controls "Gerald", a mole inside the Circus. By the time of the novel, the mole—Bill Haydon—has become The Circus' number-two man; Karla uses his handler, Alexei Polyakov, to deliver fabricated intelligence that appears highly valuable. This allows the Circus (and, thus Karla) to gain access to highly valuable intelligence from the American CIA and also creates a perfect cover for Gerald's activities: Polyakov must pretend to his superiors that he is running a mole inside the Circus to meet with the Circus officials, so the Circus itself ignores and suppresses any indications that there is a mole, not realising that there really is.

Smiley recounts what little he knows of Karla's history to his protege, Peter Guillam, including his interview with Karla in Delhi, and opines that Karla is a "fanatic", which he hopes will one day cause his downfall. After Jim Prideaux is freed from capture by the Soviets, Smiley interrogates him, learning that Karla came to visit Prideaux in prison and showed him that he still had Smiley's lighter.

After Smiley reveals that Haydon is the mole, Haydon reveals that Karla has directed all of his activities, including encouraging Haydon to cuckold Smiley. He tells him that Karla regarded Smiley as the person most likely to uncover Haydon and that the affair was calculated to cloud Smiley's judgement and cast any accusations he may make as the vengeance of a wronged husband.

As Smiley drives to break the news to his cheating spouse, he reflects that Haydon's self-justifying "confession" was an inadequate explanation for becoming a traitor in the first place, and only Karla discerned the quality in Haydon that allowed him to be turned. In Smiley's words, only Karla saw "the last little doll inside Bill Haydon."

=== The Honourable Schoolboy ===
In the aftermath of Haydon's exposure, Karla moves ruthlessly to arrest and execute those Circus agents behind the Iron Curtain that Haydon betrayed. Smiley, appointed temporary chief of the Circus, scrambles to contain the disaster and save who can be saved, but with only minimal success. Karla's aggressive targeting of operatives all over the world necessitates the Circus to shut down safe houses and recall spies even in non-Soviet countries, including one in Vietnam.

However, Smiley quickly takes the offensive. On the theory that Haydon's activities for the Circus were entirely directed by Karla, Smiley reasons that Haydon's record can lead them to other possible moles of Karla in other countries, who can yield valuable intelligence to restore the Circus's prestige. He is proven right, as evidence of Haydon's refusal to investigate a possible money laundering operation in Laos leads them to unmask Nelson Ko, Karla's mole inside the People's Republic of China. Karla does not appear to have a direct hand in protecting his mole. Instead, the Circus's main opponent is Nelson's brother Drake, a powerful Hong Kong crime lord. Although the Circus fails to capture Nelson themselves, their joint cooperation with the CIA leads to the Americans seizing him as he attempts to escape to Hong Kong from mainland China.

During his tenure as Chief, Smiley keeps a photograph of Karla on his wall, seemingly as an object of obsession. It is an uncharacteristically symbolic and personal gesture for Smiley that unsettles his subordinates. Over the course of the novel, Ann takes to calling Karla "Smiley's Black Grail," which becomes a recurring phrase.

=== Smiley's People ===
In Smiley's People, it is revealed that Karla had a young daughter, Tatiana, by a mistress whom he met during the Great Patriotic War. His mistress was Estonian, and in his daughter's incoherent memory, Karla had her mother killed after he overheard her praying (contrary to communism's atheist views). Eventually, Tatiana began to demonstrate symptoms of schizophrenia.

Unable to get her proper treatment, Karla uses a set of amateur agents to find or create a false identity that would allow him to send her to Western Europe to an adequate mental health clinic. As new Circus Chief Saul Enderby comments, Karla had to use amateurs because he had trained his own agents to be both too smart and too fanatically devoted to his ideals to be trusted with his private scheme.

Because these agents are amateurs, they make several mistakes that allow Smiley to pick up on Karla's scheme. In desperation, Karla orders several assassinations, which only galvanises Smiley's investigation. Finally, Smiley gathers damning proof of Karla's activities that will ensure his destruction by his rivals at Moscow Centre, and offers Karla a choice: defect or be destroyed. Knowing that his fall will also be Tatiana's, Karla agrees to defect.

In his only personal appearance in the novels, Karla crosses into West Berlin disguised as a laborer and is taken into custody by Circus officers. As he leaves, he drops Ann's cigarette lighter on the ground, but Smiley feels no urge to pick it up. Watching Karla be taken away, Smiley contemplates that he has won at last, but by a cruel irony, he and Karla have switched roles: Smiley has become the ruthless exploiter of Karla's vulnerability, while Karla has been defeated not through his fanaticism, but his love for his daughter.

=== Karla's Choice ===
Karla is the title character in the first George Smiley continuation novel written by le Carré's son, Nick Harkaway. It is set during the immediate aftermath of the events depicted in The Spy Who Came in from the Cold and almost a decade before the events depicted in Tinker Tailor Soldier Spy. Smiley is offered an opportunity to entrap Karla, which ultimately fails. However, he comes to realise Karla is a fanatic, providing him the resolution to return to the Circus, and setting him up for the series of confrontations recounted through Tinker Tailor Soldier Spy, The Honourable Schoolboy, and Smiley's People.

=== Other ===
Karla does not appear again in le Carré's novels, except a brief mention in The Secret Pilgrim, when Smiley tells a group of probationary intelligence officers that he was the one who debriefed Karla in captivity. Speaking in general about the nature of interrogations, Smiley says that sometimes they are "communions between damaged souls." The date of Smiley's first encounter with Karla, in the jail in New Delhi, is unclear. In Tinker Tailor Soldier Spy, we are told that the interrogation took place in the fifties. But in Smiley's People, Smiley recalls the meeting as having occurred in the sixties. Karla's ultimate fate is revealed in 2017's A Legacy of Spies, in which Jim Prideaux recounts to Guillam that following his debriefing, Smiley arranged for Karla to teach Russian at a university in Latin America. Roughly a year later, Karla committed suicide; according to Prideaux, Smiley became grief-stricken at his death, a response he doesn't understand given the nature of their relationship.

== Appearance and identity ==
Karla is described as a small, spare man in middle age with an extraordinary composure and ascetic habits. Smiley describes him as modest and avuncular, Mediterranean in appearance, and resembling a priest or schoolmaster. His most identifiable characteristic is his habit of chain smoking Camels.

== Real-life influences ==
Several real-life intelligence figures have been postulated as models for Karla, including KGB General Rem Krassilnikov, whose obituary in the New York Times stated that his CIA opponents viewed him as a real-life Karla.

== Film and television adaptations ==
Karla appears briefly in the BBC adaptations of Tinker Tailor Soldier Spy and Smiley's People, though he does not speak in either. He is played by Patrick Stewart.

Karla appears briefly in the 2011 film adaptation of Tinker Tailor Soldier Spy as a voice, provided by Michael Sarne, as well as in a partial shot in a Budapest coffee shop holding Smiley's lighter.

== Legacy ==
Karla inspired the name of the Moldovan music project Carla's Dreams.
