= Smiley Versus Karla =

1982 omnibus book by John le Carré

First US edition (publ. Knopf) under original title

Smiley Versus Karla (1982), by John le Carré, originally published as The Quest for Karla, and also published as John Le Carré: Three Complete Novels, is an omnibus edition of three novels concerning George Smiley's primary antagonist, Karla, his counterpart in Moscow Centre (the Soviet KGB). The "Karla Trilogy" comprises:

- Tinker Tailor Soldier Spy – (1974)
- The Honourable Schoolboy – (1977)
- Smiley's People – (1979)

== See also ==
- The Incongruous Spy
