= Connie Sachs =

Fictional character

- George Smiley character
- First appearance: Tinker Tailor Soldier Spy
- Last appearance: Karla's Choice
- Created by: John le Carré

In-universe information
- Gender: Female
- Occupation: Intelligence operative
- Affiliation: The Circus
- Nationality: British

Connie Sachs is a fictional character created by John le Carré. Sachs plays a key supporting role in the Karla Trilogy, Tinker Tailor Soldier Spy, The Honourable Schoolboy, and Smiley's People.

== Biography ==
Sachs is an eccentric alcoholic with an incredible memory and intellect who works in the research department of the Circus. "A don's daughter", her brothers were also dons, and she herself "some sort of academic". Her family lived at Millponds, a "beautiful Palladian house" with "lovely grounds, near Newbury", later owned by one of her brothers. According to legend, Control met her while she was at university and was so impressed that he invented a job so as to hire her. Her personal and professional life is devoted to the study of Soviet intelligence and most notably the Soviet spymaster known as Karla.

She is close to spymaster George Smiley and forced into early retirement at the same time he is. From her vast memory, she provides him with important clues in Tinker Tailor; when he must rebuild the Circus after its betrayal, Sachs returns happily to her work despite her failing health. She is crucial to the unravelling of the paper trail at the centre of The Honourable Schoolboy and retires after their success against Karla, this time permanently. When Smiley visits her for the last time in Smiley's People, she is dying from old age and alcoholism. She is taken care of by her female lover, a former Circus agent named Hilary; despite her objections, Connie agrees to speak with Smiley, and provides a key that leads to the eventual victory over Karla.

== Background ==
Sachs was widely reputed (in outline at least) to be based on the legendary real-life MI5 Soviet watcher Milicent Bagot. Although she worked in domestic intelligence (unlike the fictional Connie), she was reportedly the first to alert British authorities that double agent Kim Philby had past associations as a Communist. Bagot died, aged 99, in 2006.

== Portrayals ==
In the BBC's 1979 television adaptation of Tinker Tailor and the 1982 adaptation of Smiley's People which followed it, Sachs was played by Beryl Reid. Reid won two BAFTAs for her performance in each miniseries. In BBC Radio 4's 2009-10 adaptation of the Karla trilogy, Sachs was played by Maggie Steed. In the 2011 film adaptation Tinker Tailor Soldier Spy, Sachs was played by Kathy Burke. In the upcoming series Legacy of Spies, Sachs is played by Anjana Vasan.
