= Call for the Dead =

1961 novel by John le Carré

- First edition
- Author: John le Carré
- Language: English
- Series: George Smiley
- Genre: Crime, spy novel
- Published: 1961
- Publisher: Gollancz
- Publication place: United Kingdom
- Media type: Print (hardback & paperback)
- Pages: 157
- OCLC: 8463189

Call for the Dead is John le Carré's first novel, published in 1961. It introduces George Smiley, the most famous of le Carré's recurring characters, in a story about East German spies inside Great Britain. It also introduces a fictional version of British Intelligence, called "the Circus" because of its location in Cambridge Circus, which is apparently based on MI6 and recurs throughout le Carré's spy novels. Call for the Dead was adapted for film as The Deadly Affair (1966).

== Plot summary ==
Following a wartime excursion undercover in Germany, George Smiley returns to England and marries Lady Ann Sercombe. Although Smiley is a devoted husband, Ann's fidelity wavers, and she begins an affair with a Cuban racing driver before leaving the country with him. Smiley, infinitely self-controlled and self-deprecating, does nothing, and instead lets Ann continue to use their finances while he continues to live at their home in Bywater Street in the London borough of Chelsea, distracting himself with a love of German poetry and his work as a member of the Circus, the headquarters of the SIS named after its location on Cambridge Circus.

Smiley is abruptly summoned in the early hours of the morning by the Circus' advisor, Maston. Unsure about the meeting's purpose, he travels in by taxi to learn that Foreign Office civil servant Samuel Fennan has killed himself following a routine security check. Smiley, the interviewer, had cleared Fennan, despite only a few days earlier receiving an anonymous letter regarding Fennan's past membership of the Communist Party of Great Britain. Because Fennan did not have a private office, Smiley had suggested the interview take place in an informal manner on a lunchtime walk through London. Maston informs him that an inquiry will be convened and begins to set Smiley up for the blame for the suicide.

Smiley travels to Fennan's home, where he meets Fennan's wife Elsa. She, like her husband, was a Jewish immigrant from Europe after the Second World War, and had been interned in a concentration camp by the Nazis during the war. While at the Fennans' home, Smiley answers a telephone call, believing it to be for him from the Circus. Instead, he finds it is a requested 8:30 am call from the telephone exchange, which Smiley feels is suspicious.

Smiley meets Inspector Mendel during the course of the interview and investigation. Mendel is on the verge of retirement, and is set to retire once the Fennan case is closed. He obtains information from telephone exchange staff that confirm it was Fennan who had requested the call the night before, furthering Smiley's suspicion around Elsa. Despite this, Maston orders Smiley to refrain from investigating the death any further. Working late at his office the same day, Smiley receives a letter from Fennan from the previous night requesting they meet urgently the next day. Smiley, now believing that Fennan was murdered to prevent a meeting from occurring, writes an abrupt letter of resignation and attaches it to Fennan's letter, leaving it in his out-tray to be forwarded to Maston.

After running some errands, such as going to the dry cleaners, Smiley returns home, but notices movement in the drawing room of his house. He rings his own doorbell, and is met by a tall, fair, handsome stranger. Pretending to be part of a laundrette delivery service, he avoids entering his house, and notes the number plates of the seven cars parked in the road. Now staying with Mendel, who agrees to help him work the case independently, the pair track one car to a dealer called Adam Scarr. Scarr, a semi-professional criminal, tells Mendel that he rents the car out on anonymous agreement to a stranger known as "Blondie", who matches the description of Smiley's intruder. However, while Mendel and Scarr are conversing, Smiley is attacked while tracking "Blondie's" car and hospitalised, while Scarr is murdered after Mendel's departure.

Now hospitalised, Smiley directs the case direction from bed rest. Mendel discovers that Elsa attended a local theatre twice a month, in which she liaises with someone the theatre staff believe is her husband. Upon further investigation, this turns out to be "Blondie", and Mendel learns that the two always carry music cases to each performance, which they trade. With assistance from fellow Circus agent and Smiley's protégé Peter Guillam, the men learn that "Blondie" is actually called Hans-Dieter Mundt, and is an East German agent working undercover as a diplomatic member of the East German Steel Mission for one Dieter Frey. Smiley becomes concerned at this revelation, as Frey was one of his operatives during the war. Fanatically opposed to the Nazis, Frey was repeatedly antagonistic about them at great risk to himself. Not only was he a dissident, but he was physically disabled in one leg and needed a cane for most of his life, at a time where the Nazis executed many physically and mentally disabled people. Smiley recommended Frey to the Circus. Frey was later captured by the Nazis and sentenced to a stretch in a political prison camp doing hard labour. Later during the war, Smiley worked directly with Frey as an agent for the Circus. After the war, however, Frey rose through the ranks of East German government service and became one of its most important agents. Smiley also concludes that Frey is likely using a courier service to access only one highly placed domestic agent. Shortly after this revelation, Guillam reports that Mundt has fled to East Germany. He was subsequently identified by cabin crew.

After abruptly discharging himself from hospital, Smiley returns to confront Elsa Fennan. When pushed, she breaks, and confesses that her husband was actually a spy for East Germany, and that she was unwillingly involved in passing secret documents to the East Germans in the music case she took to the theatre. She reveals that Fennan was killed by Mundt after Frey saw him talking to Smiley during their walk through the park, believing that Fennan had cracked under the pressure of passing information to them. When she returned home, she had found Mundt and her husband's corpse, and had typed a suicide note out of fear for her own life.

Guillam, however, adds another turn to the investigation shortly after this. In an attempt to verify Elsa's claims, he examines the files that Fennan had been taking home from the Foreign Office. On closer inspection, in the period before his death he had been taking home only declassified files of little significance to British security. Smiley then realises that Elsa, not Samuel, is the East German spy, and that the accusation about Fennan had been self-composed in order to allow him to meet someone with whom he could discuss his concerns about his wife. Using his knowledge of Frey's tradecraft, Smiley, Guillam, and Mendel stage a trap to inspire a theatre rendezvous between Frey and Elsa, where Frey stealthily kills her. After being trailed by Mendel, Smiley pursues Frey. In the ensuing struggle, Frey falls into the river Thames where he drowns.

Back on bed rest in Mendel's house, Smiley turns down Maston's offer to reinstate him to the Circus with a promotion, and flies to Zürich in the hope that he can repair his relationship with Ann.

== Characters in Call for the Dead ==
- George Smiley – an officer of the Circus
- Samuel Fennan – a British civil servant, who committed an apparent suicide
- Elsa Fennan – his wife, formerly a refugee from Nazi Germany
- Inspector Mendel – Smiley's contact with the Metropolitan Police
- Peter Guillam – an officer of the Circus subordinate to Smiley
- Maston ("The Ministers' Adviser on Intelligence") – head of service for the Circus
- Adam Scarr – a semi-criminal "businessman"
- Hans-Dieter Mundt, aka "Blondie" – an agent of East German intelligence
- Dieter Frey – an agent of East German intelligence, and a former wartime agent of Smiley's

== Adaptations ==
Call for the Dead was filmed as The Deadly Affair (1967). It was directed by Sidney Lumet from a script by Paul Dehn, and starred James Mason as Charles Dobbs, (not George Smiley, as le Carré had sold the rights to use the name "George Smiley" to The Spy Who Came in from the Cold), Harry Andrews as Mendel, Simone Signoret as Elsa Fennan and Maximilian Schell as Dieter Frey. The major change in the script from the book is the addition of an affair between George's wife Ann and Dieter Frey, which presages the events of Tinker Tailor Soldier Spy.

Call for the Dead was first adapted as a BBC Radio drama in 1977, with George Cole as Smiley and Alfred Burke as Mendel. Subsequently, it was the first story to be broadcast in BBC Radio 4's major series to feature all the Smiley novels ("The Complete Smiley"), with Simon Russell Beale in the main role. Other characters and actors are as follows; Inspector Mendel—Kenneth Cranham, Elsa Fennan—Eleanor Bron, Ann Smiley—Anna Chancellor, Peter Guillam—Richard Dillane, Maston—James Laurenson, Dieter Frey—Henry Goodman, Adam Scarr/Mundt—Sam Dale, Ludo Oriel—Janice Acquah, Nursing Sister—Caroline Guthrie with Benjamin Askew and Jonathan Tafler. The novel was adapted as a 90-minute drama by Robert Forrest, produced by Patrick Raynor, and was transmitted, also on BBC Radio 4, on 23 May 2009.
