= John le Carré =

Irish-British novelist and former spy (1931–2020)

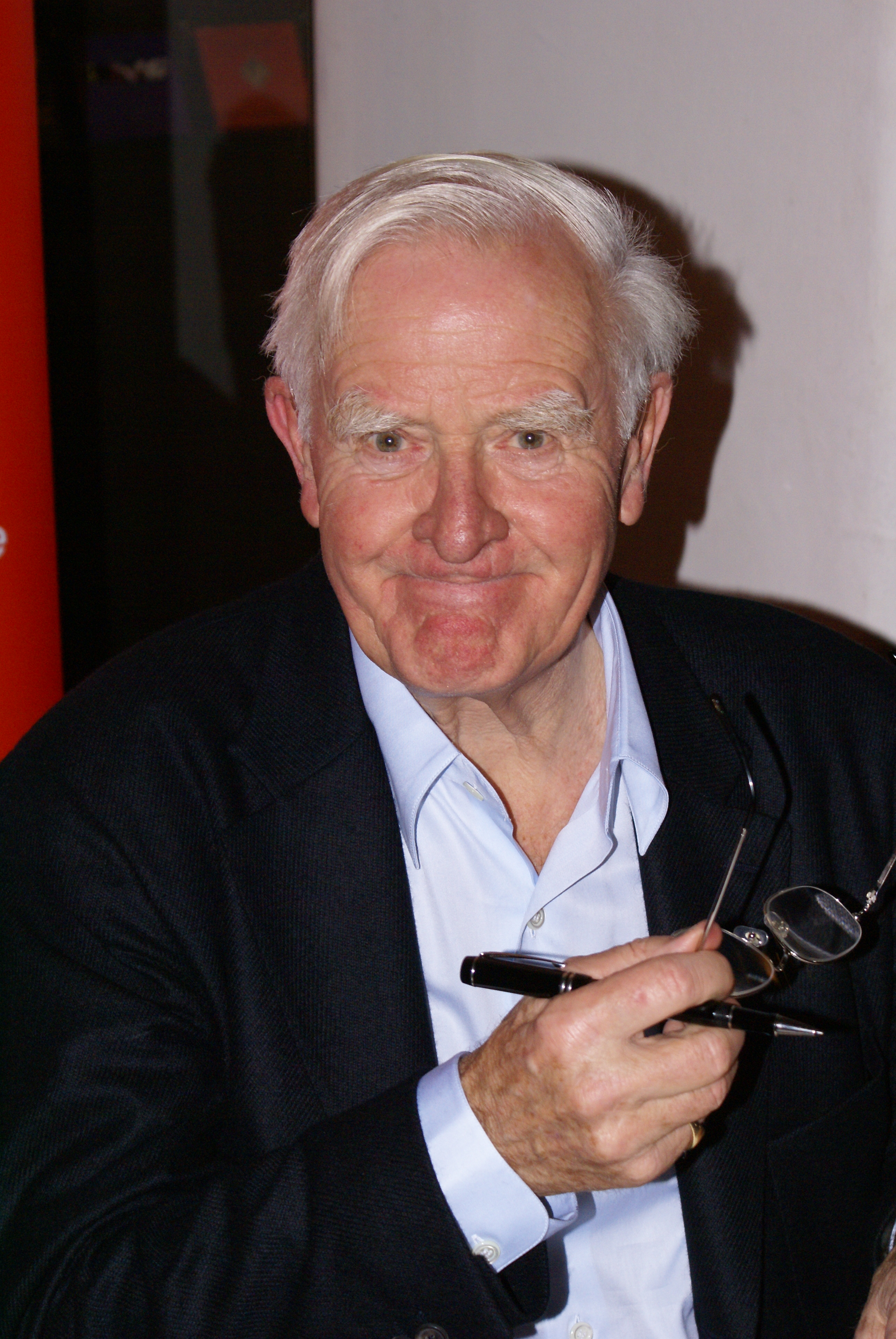
- Le Carré in 2008
- Born: David John Moore Cornwell; 19 October 1931; Poole, England
- Died: 12 December 2020 (aged 89); Truro, England
- Citizenship: United Kingdom; Ireland (c. 2020)
- Education: University of Oxford (BA)
- Occupations: Novelist; intelligence officer
- Spouses: Alison Sharp (m. 1954; div. 1971); Jane Eustace (m. 1972)
- Children: Simon Cornwell; Stephen Cornwell; Tim Cornwell; Nick Harkaway
- Relatives: Ronnie Cornwell (father); Anthony Cornwell (brother); Rupert Cornwell (half-brother); Charlotte Cornwell (half-sister)
- Writing career
- Genre: Spy fiction
- Notable works: The Spy Who Came in from the Cold; Tinker Tailor Soldier Spy; The Honourable Schoolboy; Smiley's People; The Little Drummer Girl; A Perfect Spy; The Night Manager; The Tailor of Panama; The Constant Gardener
- Website: Official website

David John Moore Cornwell (19 October 1931 – 12 December 2020), known by his pen name John le Carré (/ləˈkæreɪ/ lə-KARR-ay), was an English author. Many of his espionage novels have been adapted for film or television. He has been described as a "sophisticated, morally ambiguous writer", and is considered one of the greatest novelists of the postwar era. During the 1950s and 1960s, he worked for both the Security Service (MI5) and the Secret Intelligence Service (MI6). Near the end of his life, le Carré became an Irish citizen.

Le Carré's third novel, The Spy Who Came in from the Cold (1963) became an international best-seller, and was adapted into an award-winning film. This success allowed him to leave MI6 to become a full-time author.

His other novels that have been adapted for film or television include The Looking Glass War (1965), Tinker Tailor Soldier Spy (1974), Smiley's People (1979), The Little Drummer Girl (1983), A Perfect Spy (1986), The Russia House (1989), The Night Manager (1993), The Tailor of Panama (1996), The Constant Gardener (2001), A Most Wanted Man (2008) and Our Kind of Traitor (2010). In 2008, The Times named le Carré one of the "50 greatest British writers since 1945". Philip Roth said that A Perfect Spy (1986) was "the best English novel since the war".

== Early life and education ==
David John Moore Cornwell was born on 19 October 1931 in Poole, Dorset, England, son of Ronald Thomas Archibald Cornwell (Ronnie Cornwell), and Olive Moore Cornwell (née Glassey). His older brother, Tony, was an advertising executive and county cricketer (for Dorset), who later lived in the United States. His younger half-sister was the actress Charlotte Cornwell, and his younger half-brother, Rupert Cornwell, was a former Washington bureau chief for The Independent. Cornwell had little early memory of his mother, who had left their family home when he was five years old. His maternal uncle was Liberal MP Alec Glassey. When Cornwell was 21 years old, Glassey gave him the address in Ipswich where his mother was living; mother and son reunited at Ipswich railway station, at her written invitation, following Cornwell's initial letter of reconciliation.

Cornwell's father – who escaped from his "orthodox but repressive upbringing" as son of "a respectable nonconformist bricklayer who became a house builder and mayor of Poole" – had been jailed for insurance fraud and was a known associate of the Kray twins. The family was continually in debt. The father–son relationship has been described as "difficult". The Guardian reported that Le Carré recalled that he had been "beaten up by his father and grew up mostly starved of affection after his mother abandoned him at the age of five". Rick Pym, a scheming con man and the father of A Perfect Spy protagonist Magnus Pym, was based on Ronnie. When his father died in 1975, Cornwell paid for a memorial funeral service but did not attend, a plot point repeated in A Perfect Spy.

Cornwell's schooling began at St Andrew's Preparatory School, near Pangbourne, Berkshire, and continued at Sherborne School. He grew unhappy with the typically harsh English public school regime of the time and disliked his disciplinarian housemaster. He left Sherborne early to study foreign languages at the University of Bern from 1948 to 1949.

In 1950, he was called up for National Service in the British Army, and was commissioned in the Intelligence Corps as a second lieutenant on 21 October 1950. He was garrisoned in Allied-occupied Austria, serving as a German language interrogator of people who had crossed the Iron Curtain to the West. He transferred to the Supplementary Reserve of Officers on 1 July 1952, and was promoted to acting lieutenant on that date with seniority from 29 June 1952. In 1952, he returned to England to study at Lincoln College, Oxford, where he worked covertly for the Security Service, MI5, spying on far-left groups for information about possible Soviet agents. During his studies, he was a member of The Gridiron Club and a college dining society known as The Goblin Club. He was promoted to substantive lieutenant on 19 October 1954, with seniority from 29 June 1952.

When his father was declared bankrupt in 1954, Cornwell left Oxford to teach at Millfield Preparatory School; however, a year later, he returned to Oxford, and graduated in 1956 with a first-class degree in modern languages with a German literature concentration. He then taught French and German at Eton College for two years, before becoming an MI5 officer in 1958.

== Work in security services ==
Cornwell ran agents, conducted interrogations, tapped telephone lines and effected break-ins. Encouraged by Lord Clanmorris (who wrote crime novels as "John Bingham"), and while being an active MI5 officer, he began writing his first novel, Call for the Dead (1961). Cornwell identified Lord Clanmorris as one of two models for George Smiley, the spymaster of the Circus, the other being Vivian H. H. Green. As a schoolboy, Cornwell first met the latter when Green was the Chaplain and Assistant Master at Sherborne School (1942–51). The friendship continued after Green's move to Lincoln College, where he tutored Cornwell.

In 1960, Cornwell transferred to MI6, the foreign-intelligence service, and worked under the cover of Second Secretary at the British Embassy in Bonn. He was later transferred to Hamburg as a political consul. There, he wrote the detective story A Murder of Quality (1962) and The Spy Who Came in from the Cold (1963), as "John le Carré" – a pseudonym required because Foreign Office staff were forbidden to publish under their own names. The meaning of the pseudonym is ambiguous: he sometimes said he had seen "le Carré" on a storefront, and later said he could not remember an origin. When translated, "le carré" means "the square".

In 1964, le Carré's career as an intelligence officer came to an end as the result of the betrayal of British agents' covers to the KGB by Kim Philby, the infamous British double agent, one of the Cambridge Five. Le Carré depicted and analysed Philby as the upper-class traitor, codenamed "Gerald" by the KGB, the mole hunted by George Smiley in Tinker Tailor Soldier Spy (1974).

== Writing ==
Le Carré's first two novels, Call for the Dead (1961) and A Murder of Quality (1962), are mystery fiction. Each features a retired spy, George Smiley, investigating a death; in the first book, the apparent suicide of a suspected communist, and in the second volume, a murder at a boys' public school. Although Call for the Dead evolves into an espionage story, Smiley's motives are more personal than political. Le Carré's third novel, The Spy Who Came in from the Cold (1963), became an international best-seller and remains one of his best-selling works; following its publication, he left MI6 to become a full-time writer. Although le Carré had intended The Spy Who Came in from the Cold as an indictment of espionage as morally compromised, audiences widely viewed its protagonist, Alec Leamas, as a tragic hero. In response, le Carré's next book, The Looking Glass War, was a satire about an increasingly deadly espionage mission which ultimately proves pointless.

Tinker Tailor Soldier Spy, The Honourable Schoolboy and Smiley's People (the Karla trilogy) brought Smiley back as the central figure in a sprawling espionage saga depicting his efforts first to root out a mole in the Circus and then to entrap his Soviet rival and counterpart, code-named 'Karla'. The trilogy was originally meant to be a long-running series that would find Smiley dispatching agents after Karla all around the world. Smiley's People marked the last time Smiley featured as the central character in a le Carré story, although he brought the character back in The Secret Pilgrim and A Legacy of Spies.

A Perfect Spy (1986), which chronicles the boyhood moral education of Magnus Pym and how it leads to his becoming a spy, is the author's most autobiographical espionage novel, reflecting the boy's very close relationship with his con man father. Biographer LynnDianne Beene describes the novelist's own father, Ronnie Cornwell, as "an epic con man of little education, immense charm, extravagant tastes, but no social values". Le Carré reflected that "writing A Perfect Spy is probably what a very wise shrink would have advised". He also wrote a semi-autobiographical work, The Naïve and Sentimental Lover (1971), as the story of a man's midlife existential crisis.

With the fall of the Iron Curtain in 1989, le Carré's writing shifted to the portrayal of the new multilateral world. His first completely post-Cold War novel, The Night Manager (1993), deals with drug and arms smuggling in the world of Latin American drug lords, secretive Caribbean banking entities and corrupt Western officials. His final novel, Silverview, was published posthumously in 2021.

=== Themes ===
Most of le Carré's books are spy stories set during the Cold War (1945–91) and portray British Intelligence agents as unheroic political functionaries, aware of the moral ambiguity of their work and engaged more in psychological than physical drama. While "[espionage] was the genre that earned him fame...he used it as a platform to explore larger ethical problems and the human condition". The insight he demonstrated led "many fellow authors and critics [to regard] him as one of the finest English-language novelists of the twentieth century." His writing explores "human frailty—moral ambiguity, intrigue, nuance, doubt, and cowardice".

The fallibility of Western democracy – and of its secret services – is a recurring theme, as are suggestions of a possible east–west moral equivalence. Characters experience little of the violence typically encountered in action thrillers and have very little recourse to gadgets. Much of the conflict is internal, rather than external and visible. The recurring character George Smiley, who plays a central role in five novels and appears as a supporting character in four more, was written as an "antidote" to James Bond, a character le Carré called "an international gangster" rather than a spy and who he felt should be excluded from the canon of espionage literature. In contrast, he intended Smiley, who is an overweight, bespectacled bureaucrat who uses cunning and manipulation to achieve his ends, as an accurate depiction of a spy.

Le Carré's "writing entered intelligence services themselves. He popularized the term 'mole'...and other language that has become intelligence vernacular on both sides of the Atlantic – 'honeytrap', 'scalphunter', 'lamplighter' to name a few." However, in his first tweet as MI6's chief, Richard Moore revealed the agency's "complicated relationship with the author: He urged would-be Smileys not to apply to the service."

=== Other writing, film cameos ===
Le Carré records a number of incidents from his period as a diplomat in his autobiographical work, The Pigeon Tunnel: Stories from My Life (2016), which include escorting six visiting German parliamentarians to a London brothel and translating at a meeting between a senior German politician and Harold Macmillan.

As a journalist, le Carré wrote The Unbearable Peace (1991), a nonfiction account of Brigadier Jean-Louis Jeanmaire (1911–1992), the Swiss Army officer, who spied for the Soviet Union from 1962 until 1975.

Credited under his pen name, le Carré appears as an extra in the 2011 film version of Tinker Tailor Soldier Spy, among the guests at the Christmas party in several flashback scenes. He also appears, in uncredited cameo roles, as a museum usher in Our Kind of Traitor 2016, and in the BBC TV production The Night Manager (2016), as a restaurant diner.

== Politics ==
=== Threats to democracy ===
In 2017, le Carré expressed concerns over the future of liberal democracy, saying: "I think of all things that were happening across Europe in the 1930s, in Spain, in Japan, obviously in Germany. To me, these are absolutely comparable signs of the rise of fascism and it's contagious, it's infectious. Fascism is up and running in Poland and Hungary. There's an encouragement about." He later wrote that the end of the Cold War had left the West without a coherent ideology, in contrast to the "notion of individual freedom, of inclusiveness, of tolerance – all of that we called anti-communism" prevailing during that time.

Le Carré opposed both U.S. President Donald Trump and Russian President Vladimir Putin, arguing that their desire to seek or maintain their countries' superpower status caused an impulse "for oligarchy, the dismissal of the truth, the contempt, actually, for the electorate and for the democratic system". Le Carré compared Trump's tendency to dismiss the media as "fake news" to the Nazi book burnings, and wrote that the United States is "heading straight down the road to institutional racism and neo-fascism".

In le Carré's 2019 novel Agent Running in the Field, one of the novel's characters refers to Trump as "Putin's shithouse cleaner" who "does everything for little Vladi that little Vladi can't do for himself". The novel's narrator describes Boris Johnson as "a pig-ignorant foreign secretary". He says Russia is moving "backwards into her dark, delusional past", with Britain following a short way behind. Le Carré later said that he believed the novel's plotline, involving the U.S. and British intelligence services colluding to subvert the European Union, to be "horribly possible".

=== Brexit ===
Le Carré was an outspoken advocate of European integration and sharply criticised Brexit. He criticised Brexit advocates such as Boris Johnson (whom he referred to as a "mob orator"), Dominic Cummings and Nigel Farage in interviews, claiming that their "task is to fire up the people with nostalgia [and] with anger". Le Carré further opined that: "What really scares me about nostalgia is that it's become a political weapon. Politicians are creating a nostalgia for an England that never existed, and selling it, really, as something we could return to", adding that with "the demise of the working class we saw also the demise of an established social order, based on the stability of ancient class structures". On the other hand, he claimed that the UK Labour Party has "this Leninist element and they have this huge appetite to level society."

Le Carré once compared Brexit to the 1956 Suez Crisis, stating that it was "without doubt the greatest catastrophe and the greatest idiocy that Britain has perpetrated since the invasion of Suez... The idea, to me, that at the moment we should imagine we can substitute access to the biggest trade union in the world with access to the American market is terrifying", he said. Speaking to The Guardian in 2019, he commented: "I've always believed, though ironically it's not the way I've voted, that it's compassionate conservatism that in the end could, for example, integrate the private schooling system. If you do it from the left you will seem to be acting out of resentment; do it from the right and it looks like good social organisation." Le Carré also said: "I think my own ties to England were hugely loosened over the last few years. And it's a kind of liberation, if a sad kind."

=== US invasion of Iraq ===
In January 2003, two months prior to the invasion, The Times published le Carré's essay "The United States Has Gone Mad" criticising the buildup to the Iraq War and President George W. Bush's response to the 11 September 2001 terrorist attacks, calling it "worse than McCarthyism, worse than the Bay of Pigs and in the long term potentially more disastrous than the Vietnam War" and "beyond anything Osama bin Laden could have hoped for in his nastiest dreams". Le Carré participated in the London protests against the Iraq War. He said the war resulted from the "politicisation of intelligence to fit the political intentions" of governments and "How Bush and his junta succeeded in deflecting America's anger from bin Laden to Saddam Hussein is one of the great public relations conjuring tricks of history".

He was critical of Tony Blair's role in taking Britain into the Iraq War, saying: "I can't understand that Blair has an afterlife at all. It seems to me that any politician who takes his country to war under false pretences has committed the ultimate sin. I think that a war in which we refuse to accept the body count of those that we kill is also a war of which we should be ashamed."

=== Iran ===
Le Carré was critical of Western governments' policies towards Iran. He said that Iran's actions are a response to being "encircled by nuclear powers" and by the way in which "we ousted Mosaddeq through the CIA and the Secret Service here across the way and installed the Shah and trained his ghastly secret police force in all the black arts, the SAVAK".

Le Carré feuded with Salman Rushdie over The Satanic Verses, stating: "Nobody has a God-given right to insult a great religion and be published with impunity".

=== Israel and Palestine ===
While researching The Little Drummer Girl, le Carré travelled through the region – including Lebanon – where he met Yasser Arafat. He recounts:

"I have come … to put my hand on the Palestinian heart." Arafat then seized le Carré's hand, placing it on his chest. This experience enabled him to see the Palestinians as victims with legitimate claims, and not as merely terrorists.

In a 1998 interview with Douglas Davis, Le Carré described Israel as "the most extraordinary carnival of human variety that I have ever set eyes on, a nation in the process of re-assembling itself from the shards of its past, now Oriental, now Western, now secular, now religious, but always anxiously moralizing about itself, criticizing itself with Maoist ferocity, a nation crackling with debate, rediscovering its past while it fought for its future." He declared: "No nation on earth was more deserving of peace—or more condemned to fight for it." In 2003, Le Carré criticised how neo-conservative influences and the Israel lobby shaped U.S. Middle East policy, implying that such manipulation fed continuous conflict. He said the novel (Absolute Friends) was intended to show:

"… neo-conservative group which is commanding the political high ground, calling the shots and appointing the State of Israel as the purpose of all Middle Eastern and practically all global policy." This frames Israel – not necessarily the nation, but its political positioning – as central to escalatory foreign policy trends fuelling instability.

Le Carré emphasised both empathy and support:

"I stood – and stand – wholeheartedly behind the nation-state of Israel … And wholeheartedly behind the peace process as the guarantor not only of Israel's survival, but of the Palestinian survival also."

== Personal life ==
In 1954, Cornwell married childhood friend Alison Ann Veronica Sharp. They had three sons: film producers Simon and Stephen Cornwell (who in 2011 jointly founded production company The Ink Factory, which has produced several TV series based on Cornwell's novels), and journalist Tim Cornwell (1962-2022) They divorced in 1971. In 1972, Cornwell married Jane Eustace, a book editor with Hodder & Stoughton who collaborated with him behind the scenes. They had a son, Nicholas, who writes as Nick Harkaway. Le Carré lived in St Buryan, Cornwall, for more than 40 years; he owned a mile of cliff near Land's End. The house, Tregiffian Cottage, was put up for sale in 2023 for £3 million. Le Carré also owned a house in Gainsborough Gardens in Hampstead in north London.

In 2010, le Carré donated his literary archive to the Bodleian Library, Oxford. The initial 85 boxes of material deposited included handwritten drafts of Tinker Tailor Soldier Spy and The Constant Gardener. The library hosted a public display of these and other items to mark World Book Day in March 2011.

Le Carré was so disillusioned by the 2016 Brexit vote to leave the European Union that he secured Irish citizenship. In a BBC documentary broadcast in 2021, le Carré's son Nicholas revealed that his father's disillusionment with modern Britain, and Brexit in particular, had driven him to embrace his Irish heritage and become an Irish citizen. At the time of his death, le Carré's friend, the novelist John Banville, confirmed that the writer had researched his family roots in Inchinattin, near Rosscarbery, County Cork, and that he had applied for an Irish passport, to which he was entitled having completed the process of becoming an Irish citizen and having Irish ancestry through his maternal grandmother, Olive Wolfe. His neighbour and friend Philippe Sands recalled:

He became an Irishman through his maternal grandmother. And it was very, very moving, I have to say, to arrive at the place of the memorial to find an Irish flag and only an Irish flag. He had really in the last years, grown very disillusioned with what had happened to Britain and the United Kingdom.

Le Carré died at Royal Cornwall Hospital, Truro, on 12 December 2020, aged 89. An inquest completed in June 2021 concluded that le Carré died after sustaining a fall at his home. His wife Jane died on 27 February 2021, two months after her husband, at age 82.

Le Carré's son Timothy died on 31 May 2022 at the age of 59, shortly after he finished editing A Private Spy, a collection of his father's letters. In 2023, biographer Adam Sisman in The Secret Life of John le Carré identified 11 women with whom le Carré had affairs during his second marriage. The accusations arrived posthumously and are unsubstantiated by other sources.

His published letters show an enduring fondness for his first wife and immediate family and admiration for fellow writers and broadcasters. Le Carré appears to have deliberately mixed responses to rejection notices, caring comments to family, and cryptic references to Cold War espionage into the letters.

== Selected works ==
=== Novels ===
- Call for the Dead (1961), OCLC 751303381
- A Murder of Quality (1962), OCLC 777015390
- The Spy Who Came in from the Cold (1963), OCLC 561198531
- The Looking Glass War (1965), OCLC 752987890
- A Small Town in Germany (1968), ISBN 0-143-12260-6
- The Naïve and Sentimental Lover (1971), ISBN 0-143-11975-3
- Smiley Versus Karla trilogy
  - Tinker Tailor Soldier Spy (1974), ISBN 0-143-12093-X
  - The Honourable Schoolboy (1977), ISBN 0-143-11973-7
  - Smiley's People (1979), ISBN 0-340-99439-8
- The Little Drummer Girl (1983), ISBN 0-143-11974-5
- A Perfect Spy (1986), ISBN 0-143-11976-1
- The Russia House (1989), ISBN 0-743-46466-4
- The Secret Pilgrim (1990), ISBN 0-345-50442-9
- The Night Manager (1993), ISBN 0-345-38576-4
- Our Game (1995), ISBN 0-345-40000-3
- The Tailor of Panama (1996), ISBN 0-345-42043-8
- Single & Single (1999), ISBN 0-743-45806-0
- The Constant Gardener (2001), ISBN 0-743-28720-7
- Absolute Friends (2003), ISBN 0-670-04489-X
- The Mission Song (2006), ISBN 0-340-92199-4
- A Most Wanted Man (2008), ISBN 1-416-59609-7
- Our Kind of Traitor (2010), ISBN 0-143-11972-9
- A Delicate Truth (2013), ISBN 0-143-12531-1
- A Legacy of Spies (2017), ISBN 978-0-735-22511-4
- Agent Running in the Field (2019), ISBN 1984878875
- Silverview (2021), ISBN 9780241550069

== Awards and honours ==
- 1963, British Crime Writers' Association Gold Dagger for The Spy Who Came in from the Cold
- 1964, Somerset Maugham Award for The Spy Who Came in from the Cold
- 1965, Mystery Writers of America Edgar Award for The Spy Who Came in from the Cold
- 1977, British Crime Writers' Association Gold Dagger for The Honourable Schoolboy
- 1977, James Tait Black Memorial Prize Fiction Award for The Honourable Schoolboy
- 1983, Japan Adventure Fiction Association Prize for The Little Drummer Girl
- 1984, Honorary Fellow Lincoln College, Oxford
- 1984, Mystery Writers of America Edgar Grand Master
- 1988, Crime Writers' Association Diamond Dagger Lifetime Achievement Award
- 1988, The Malaparte Prize, Italy
- 1990, Honorary degree, University of Exeter
- 1990, Helmerich Award of the Tulsa Library Trust.
- 1996, Honorary degree, University of St. Andrews
- 1997, Honorary degree, University of Southampton
- 1998, Honorary degree, University of Bath
- 2005, Crime Writers' Association Dagger of Daggers for The Spy Who Came in from the Cold
- 2005, Commander of the Order of Arts and Letters, France
- 2008, honorary doctorate, University of Bern
- 2011, Goethe Medal, awarded by the Goethe Institute
- 2012, Honorary degree of Doctor of Letters, University of Oxford
- 2020, Olof Palme Prize – le Carré donated the US$100,000 prize money to Médecins Sans Frontières.

In addition in 2008, The Times ranked le Carré 22nd on its list of the "50 greatest British writers since 1945".

== Citations ==
=== Sources ===
- Beene, Lynn Dianne (1992). John le Carré. New York: Twayne Publishers. ISBN 9780805770131.
- Cobbs, John L. (1998). Understanding John Le Carré. University of South Carolina Press. ISBN 978-1-57003-168-7.
- Manning, Toby (25 January 2018). John le Carré and the Cold War. Bloomsbury Publishing. ISBN 978-1-350-03640-6.
