= Tinker, Tailor (disambiguation) =

Tinker, Tailor is a counting game, nursery rhyme and fortune telling song.

Tinker, Tailor may also refer to:

- Tinker Tailor Soldier Spy, a 1974 spy novel by John le Carré
- Tinker Tailor Soldier Spy (TV series), a 1979 TV adaptation of the novel
  - "Tinker Tailor" (Tinker Tailor Soldier Spy), an episode of the series
- Tinker Tailor Soldier Spy (film), a 2011 film adaptation of the novel
- "Tinker Tailor Soldier Sailor Rich Man Poor Man Beggar Man Thief", a song released on the 2016 album A Moon Shaped Pool by Radiohead

== See also ==
- Rich Man, Poor Man (disambiguation)
