= Poor Man's Son =

Poor Man's Son may refer to the following:

== Literature ==
- A Poor Man's Son, a novel by Akim Samar, a Soviet soldier considered the first writer in the Nanai language
- The Poor Man's Son, a novel by Mouloud Feraoun, an Algerian martyr who wrote in French

== Music ==
- "Poor Man's Son" (song), by Survivor
- "Poor Man's Son", a song from Noah Gundersen's album Ledges (2014), based upon the hymn "Down in the River to Pray"
- "Poor Man's Son", a song by The Rockin' Berries

== See also ==
- Poor Man's Bible
- Poor man's copyright
- Rich Man, Poor Man (disambiguation)
