= The Skin I Live In (soundtrack) =

The Skin I Live In (Original Motion Picture Soundtrack)

Film score by Alberto Iglesias
- Released: September 29, 2011
- Recorded: 2011
- Genre: Film score
- Length: 73:18
- Label: Lakeshore; Quartet
- Producer: Alberto Iglesias; Javier Casado

Alberto Iglesias chronology
Even the Rain (2010)	The Skin I Live In (2011)	Tinker Tailor Soldier Spy (2011)

The Skin I Live In (Original Motion Picture Soundtrack) is the soundtrack to the 2011 film The Skin I Live In directed by Pedro Almodóvar. The soundtrack features original score composed by Alberto Iglesias and contributions from Chris Garneau, Trentemøller and Concha Buika. Lakeshore Records and Quartet Records distributed the soundtrack on September 29, 2011.

== Background ==
Iglesias has been a recurrent collaborator of Almodóvar since The Flower of My Secret (1995). The Skin I Live In is their seventh film together. The score consisted of bass, cello, piano and violin, viola which were played solely and not part of the minimalistic orchestra. Iglesias further used Absynth—a semi-modular virtual synthesizer—and a gospel organ as a part of the score. The solo violin is played in a neo-baroque virtuoso style by Spanish violinist Vicente Huerta. It was played in such a way to emulate a gothic romantic atmosphere and express the surgeon's sadistic attitudes which aligned the cultural association of the violin with the supernatural elements thereby contributing to the thematic richness.

== Reception ==
Fionnuala Halligan of Screen Daily described that Iglesias' score is influenced by Antonio Vivaldi's compositions. Michael Gingold of Fangoria wrote "Alberto Iglesias' eerie, violin-suffused score is another throwback to [Alfred] Hitchcock, recalling Bernard Herrmann's compositions for Vertigo and others". Kirk Honeycutt of The Hollywood Reporter wrote "Alberto Iglesias' music, present a lushly beautiful setting, which is nonetheless a prison and house of horror." Michael Leader of Den of Geek, praised Iglesias' score, saying:

"Alberto Iglesias' astounding score is a diverse work, taking in a wide array of tones and arrangements, shifting from high tension string sections, to electronic backbeats, from guitar drones to moody saxophone. It's a complicated set of cues for a complicated film."

Dana Stevens of Slate wrote "Alberto Iglesias' magnificent score pulses with obscure menace". Jonathan Romney of The Independent called it as a "shimmering quasi-techno score". Justin Chang of Variety described it as an "arresting score". Joe Morgenstern of The Wall Street Journal wrote "An urgent Alberto Iglesias score propels the action, but the theme song of "The Skin I Live In" could be a switch on a Cole Porter standard".

IndieWire listed the score for The Skin I Live In in their best film soundtracks and scores of 2011. Writing for the article, Oliver Lyletton opined that the score is "appropriately chilling, contoured with thriller-ish anxiety and flecked with a deep splash of questionable lust, control, longing and desire, all of which unifies into yet another brilliant effort." The Hollywood Reporter critic Todd McCarthy listed the score as a potential contender for the Academy Award for Best Original Score at the 84th Academy Awards.

== Track listing ==
The Skin I Live In (Original Motion Picture Soundtrack) track listing
No.	Title	Artist(s)	Length
1.	"Los Vestidos Desgarrados"	Alberto Iglesias	2:34
2.	"Tema de Vera"	Iglesias	2:27
3.	"El Cigarral"	Iglesias	3:46
4.	"La Convivencia"	Iglesias	1:23
5.	"El Asalto del Hombre Tire"	Iglesias	7:36
6.	"Between the Bars"	Chris Garneau	3:05
7.	"Shades of Marble"	Trentemøller	5:52
8.	"Por el Amor de Amar"	Concha Buika	2:41
9.	"Una Patada en los Huevos"	Iglesias	1:48
10.	"Prometeo Encadenado"	Iglesias	5:01
11.	"La Pared Transparente"	Iglesias	2:21
12.	"En el Calor de la Noche"	Iglesias	5:59
13.	"Libertad Vigilada"	Iglesias	2:36
14.	"Pequeña Flor"	Iglesias	3:07
15.	"Se Me Hizo Fácil"	Buika	4:05
16.	"Duelo Final"	Iglesias	8:00
17.	"Tributo a Cormac McCarthy"	Iglesias	1:35
18.	"Rojo y Negro"	Iglesias	4:04
19.	"La Pared-diario"	Iglesias	1:21
20.	"Créditos – La Identidad Inaccesible"	Iglesias	3:57
Total length:			73:18

== Personnel ==
Credits adapted from CD liner notes.

- Music composer, arranger – Alberto Iglesias
- Producers – Alberto Iglesias, Javier Casado
- Music programming, recording, mixing and mastering – José Luis Crespo
- Engineer – Fiona Cruickshank
- Mixing assistance – Emilio García, Santiago Quizpe
- Musical assistance – David Cerrejón
- Music librarian – David Cerrejón
- Co-ordinator – Ana Eusa, Javier Martín
- Executive producer – Jose M. Benitez, Nacho B. Govantes, Esther García

Orchestra

- Orchestra conductor – Alberto Iglesias
- Orchestra contractor – Isobel Griffiths Ltd
- Assistant orchestra contractor – Jo Buckley
- Orchestra leader – Everton Nelson

Soloists

- Bass – Mary Scully
- Cello – Anthony Pleeth
- French horn – Andy Crowley
- Piano – Javier Casado
- Viola – Peter Lane
- Violin – Vicent Huerta

== Accolades ==
Accolades for The Skin I Live In (Original Motion Picture Soundtrack)
Awards group	Category	Recipient	Result	Ref.
Cinema Writers Circle Awards	Best Score	Alberto Iglesias	Nominated	
European Film Awards	Best Composer	Alberto Iglesias	Nominated	
Goya Awards	Best Original Score	Alberto Iglesias	Won	
Hollywood Film Awards	Best Composer	Alberto Iglesias	Nominated	
International Cinephile Society Awards	Best Original Score	Alberto Iglesias	Nominated	
London Critics Circle Film Awards	Technical Achievement of the Year	Alberto Iglesias (score)	Nominated	
World Soundtrack Awards	Best Composer of the Year	Alberto Iglesias	Won	
