= The Secret Pilgrim =

1990 spy novel by John le Carré

- First edition (UK)
- Author: John le Carré
- Language: English
- Series: George Smiley
- Genre: Spy fiction
- Publisher: Hodder & Stoughton (UK); Alfred A. Knopf (US)
- Publication date: January 1990
- Publication place: United Kingdom
- Media type: Print (hardback and paperback)
- Pages: 335
- ISBN: 0-394-58842-8
- OCLC: 231273662
- Dewey Decimal: 823/.914 20 L456
- LC Class: PR6062.E33 L43 1991

The Secret Pilgrim is a 1990 episodic novel by British writer John le Carré, set within the frame narrative of an informal dinner talk given at the spy-training school in Sarratt by George Smiley. As Smiley talks, the first-person narrator, whom readers know only as "Ned", recalls his own experiences in a long career in the service. The various episodes are triggered by comments from Smiley, which send Ned into tangential memories. The individual stories together create a portrait of Ned himself, moving from the start of his career at the beginning of the novel to his retirement in the final chapter.

== Plot ==
=== Part one ===
Smiley reflects on the end of the Cold War, and makes a rueful joke that, in one way, the world has changed, but in another, it has always been the same and the secret services are gradually waking up from their own deluded perceptions of it, and themselves.

After a couple of years of training at the Sarratt Nursery, in the glens of Argyll and battle camps of Wiltshire, Ned is looking forward to his first overseas posting and is disappointed to be kept in London, as part of a team of watchers keeping an eye on a Middle Eastern royal family. In a famous Knightsbridge store, Ned becomes alarmed when he sees a suspicious Arab closely following the prince's wife at a distance. Ned prepares to incapacitate him with a martial arts blow, but his supervisor Monty grabs Ned and holds him back. Ned learns that the wife is a compulsive shoplifter and the man is not a fanatic assassin, but instead assigned by the prince to pay compensation and hush money to the stores she steals from. Monty comments, "That's the trouble in our job, Ned. Life's looking one way, we're looking the other."

=== Part two ===
Smiley informs Ned's students that no one on Earth is more adept at hiding his true feelings than the privately educated Englishman – "which is why some of our best officers turn out to be our worst, and our worst, our best, and why the most difficult agent you'll ever have to run is yourself."

Ned returns to his flat in humiliation after the episode in Knightsbridge, and finds Smiley and the Circus's head of Personnel going through his belongings. Smiley informs him that Ned's best friend from Sarratt, Benjamin Arno Cavendish, disappeared just after starting his assignment in Berlin, and the East German network he was supposed to be running has collapsed. In Ben's flat, the Circus found a love letter written to Ned. Ned is shocked, as he had no idea that Ben was homosexual, much less so passionately attached to him.

After Smiley leaves, Ned tracks down Ben, hiding with his German cousin, Stephanie, in the Western Isles of Scotland. Ben confesses that, beneath his confident, derring-do exterior, he is always terrified of failure, especially when he feels he has to live up to the example of his father, who had an illustrious career during the Second World War as a mathematician, devising the Double-Cross System. While in Berlin, Ben was constantly harassed and patronised by his immediate superior, Haggerty, who despised Ben for replacing him due to his clean reputation. Before his first meeting with the lead agent in East Germany, Ben wrote a crib sheet with the agents' names and contact procedures, and took it with him when he crossed into East Berlin. As it turned out, he didn't need it, and his meeting with the agent went perfectly, but after he crossed back into West Germany, he realised he'd lost the crib sheet somewhere. Unable to warn the network before it collapsed, Ben secretly fled Germany and sought shelter with Stephanie. It takes a moment for Ned to absorb the "appalling banality" of Ben's story; "that you could lose a network in the same way you might lose a set of keys or a pocket handkerchief."

Smiley has had Ned followed, and Circus agents arrive to take Ben in for questioning, shortly after he finishes his story. Ned later hears that he has been dismissed from the Circus.

=== Part three ===
While one of Ned's students is quizzing Smiley about the 'secret' of conducting an interrogation, Smiley frowns and says that recognising the truth is far more difficult than spotting a lie. After all, spies are naturally suspicious people, and nothing is more suspicious to them than a completely innocent man who has nothing to hide.

After his unwitting exposure of his friend Benjamin Cavendish, Ned is posted to Hamburg in Western Germany to run a network of Baltic sailors, led by a passionate Latvian smuggler named Brandt. Though surprisingly efficient, Ned is wary of his position due to his predecessor's hushed up departure after embezzling massive amounts of Circus funds and settling to Southern Spain with his boyfriend.

In the course of their operations, Brandt reveals his new girlfriend, Bella, who is said to be the daughter of a friend of Brandt's. Head of London Station, Bill Haydon orders Ned to inquire about Bella's credentials due to the fact that her sudden appearance in the network's inner circle appears suspicious. Ned eventually seduces (or rather, is seduced by) Bella and they begin an affair during Brandt's absence.

Later, Brandt's men walk into a trap at the coast of Narva in Estonia and the crew are taken by the Soviets. Brandt is taken to Sarratt for interrogation while Ned is summoned to London for debriefing. He is interviewed by Haydon, who was accompanied by his lieutenants, Roy Bland and Toby Esterhase along with George Smiley. Ned is interrogated about Bella's background and her story about being the daughter of a German soldier who had raped her mother when her "father" was fighting in the Second World War.

Though Ned answers reasonably, Haydon counters him with a photograph, depicting Bella as a language student in a Moscow Centre linguistics school that trains prospective undercover agents. Haydon's coterie, barring Smiley, take the photograph as genuine, as its source is London Station's Witchcraft Project. Ultimately, it's decided that Bella must have been the mole and Ned is ordered to bring her in to be interrogated in Sarratt. Eventually, the inquiry stagnates and both Bella and Brandt are released to settle in Canada and to resume smuggling, respectively.

Brandt refuses to take Bella back for then-unknown reasons, which gives Ned the impression that Haydon informed Brandt of Bella's infidelity, out of mischief. In 1989, during a lunch with Toby Esterhase, Ned learns that Esterhase and Peter Guillam were in Moscow as a part of an intelligence delegation. During their guided tour in Moscow Centre headquarters, they run into a familiar figure who is none other than Captain Brandt. It was Brandt who had betrayed the previous network, as well as the new one.

=== Part four ===
Ned reflects that every employee of the Circus of a certain generation can recall where he or she was at the time of "The Fall" – Bill Haydon's exposure as a KGB mole. Ned himself was in Rome, in the middle of a celebratory dinner after installing a wiretap against a Roman Catholic cardinal suspected of involvement with arms dealers, when he received the telex from London with the shocking news.

With Haydon's exposure, every Circus officer's identity must be considered compromised, and Ned is told that he cannot be posted anywhere outside of Western Bloc countries.

=== Part five ===
Smiley muses that the most vulgar thing about the Cold War was that the Western societies learned to "gobble up [their] own propaganda." The West became so convinced of the righteousness of its own cause, and the evil of the Soviets', that it never stopped to examine the ethics of its actions. In the name of expediency, the Circus opened its arms – and its purse – to every petty thug and two-bit con man who called himself an anti-Communist.

Ned's first post-Haydon posting is to Munich, as the Circus's liaison with various Eastern Bloc exile communities, quietly discouraging their crackpot schemes to foment anarchy in the Soviet Union, or encouraging whatever legitimate intelligence sources they have in their home countries. According to Toby Esterhase, the "star" of the Circus's Munich arm is Professor Teodor, a fugitive Hungarian academic. At first, Ned is dazzled by Teodor's passionate lectures on the evils wreaked on Hungary by the Allied Powers after World War I, but finds his opinions shallow when the Professor is quizzed on more current events. Giving Teodor the benefit of the doubt, Ned corresponds to his associates in the American intelligence fraternity, only to learn that they had come to realise that Teodor's intelligence work is completely worthless. Ned begins to see that the Circus has good reason for denying Teodor's repeated requests to be issued a British passport.

In the middle of the night, Ned is called to Teodor's home and introduced to a Hungarian man named Latzi, who says he has been sent by the Hungarian secret service to assassinate Teodor, but has refused out of admiration for the Professor and wants to defect. Before long, Esterhase and the American CIA are lauding the two Hungarians for their courage and arranging for Teodor's honourable retirement from intelligence work, including issuing passports. Ned's protests that "the whole thing's a con" are ignored.

Aside, Teodor's long-suffering wife confesses that Latzi is a "bad actor" and an old friend of Teodor, whom Teodor used as a go-between when he wanted to inform on his students to the Hungarian authorities. When Ned vents his outrage to Smiley back in London, Smiley regards the incident as an amusing farce, initially only remarking, "Oh, Toby." As Smiley later explains, "all churches need their saints... and saints, when you get right down to it, are a pretty bogus lot." Later, Teodor and Latzi are the "stars" of a highly publicized book tour throughout the United States, detailing Teodor's courageous work against communism and his harrowing escape from death.

=== Part six ===
After delighting Ned's students with a lighthearted story about how the Circus recruited a South American diplomat with a secret passion for British model trains, Smiley sobers and reflects that intelligence officers usually remain aloof from the harsher realities of their work, but sometimes they are forced to confront it, and become a little more humble about the risks they ask their agents to take.

The Circus receives a surprise message from a Polish agent who was thought to have been killed in the aftermath of Haydon's exposure. Despite the risks, Ned is sent to re-establish contact, posing as a Dutch businessman. Once he arrives, he finds that the whole thing is a trap; the agent is long dead, and Ned is arrested and brutally tortured by the Poles' ruthless counterintelligence chief, Colonel Jerzy. Despite this, he refuses to abandon his cover story or reveal any information. Then Jerzy takes Ned to the countryside and tells him that he wishes to spy for the Circus, but will work only through Ned – Ned's interrogation was a test, to make sure Jerzy had the right man as his handler. Over the next five years, Ned runs Jerzy, who provides copious amounts of information about the Polish intelligence. Throughout their correspondence, Ned tries to uncover Jerzy's motive for helping the British, eliminating many known motives such as money, disillusionment, and change of heart, but Jerzy remains opaque to Ned's prying. Ultimately, Jerzy reveals that his "motive" was simply the element of danger it introduced to his profoundly cynical and nihilistic outlook to life.

Years later, several weeks before the graduation dinner, Ned sees Jerzy on the television while watching the evening news about a Polish cardinal blessing his flock. Ned observes Jerzy, who seems physically drained and haggard after the collapse of the Soviet Union, is then summoned to the cardinal. To Ned's surprise, Jerzy kneels before the cardinal, who had wavered through an instinctive fear, and receives his blessing. Ned realises that the cardinal must have been one of Jerzy's many torture victims.

=== Part seven ===
Smiley warns Ned's students that spies can encounter a mid-life crisis the same as any others do, and sometimes the effects are more severe, given the nature of their work and their inclination to keep their true feelings concealed from everyone, including themselves.

Ned remembers his own middle-age crisis, in which his marriage had grown stale and he began to feel that he had reached his forties without any clear idea of what he had accomplished in his career. After gaining a reasonable amount of seniority and prestige, thanks to the kudos accruing from his productive running of Colonel Jerzy, Ned is appointed as a sort of roving troubleshooter, hopping around the globe to investigate random leads or smother minor crises.

One of his assignments takes him to Beirut, where the chaos of the latest fighting seems to mirror his own inner turmoil. While tracking a German militant named Britta, who had been involved with an Irish terrorist called Seamus, his first stop is a brief research post with a well-mannered officer named Giles Latimer. Despite his good nature and popularity, it is revealed that Giles had suffered a nervous breakdown and hid dozens of confidential files out of shame and guilt he felt towards a young girl he had fallen in love with.

Following this episode, Ned flies to Beirut in search of an informer and checks into a hotel, where he receives a phone call from an American woman who flirts with him but remains unknown despite Ned's inquiries to the hotel clerk. Ned's Lebanon trip ends with his encounter with a young American student, who was the sole survivor of a car bombing on a downtown restaurant in Beirut. The student, Saul, in his shell-shocked state of delirium, had written a call for peace. Ned sees whether he could find something sensible, but in his own state of personal crisis, scribbles his own thoughts as well and ends up burning the whole thing.

=== Part eight ===
One of Ned's students argues to Smiley that professional journalists do the same job as spies do, and may even do it better, so why bother with intelligence services at all? Instead of disagreeing, Smiley says she has an excellent point – the trouble is, no government will ever trust advice from a journalist, no matter how sound. Smiley assures these future agents that their jobs will always be necessary, and always in demand.

Ned is ordered to travel to Saigon to track down a Circus agent who has gone missing, a lapsed Catholic missionary named Hansen. Also half-Dutch, Hansen was born to an English mother who had provided him with Jesuit education. An accomplished polyglot from an early age, he had received religious training and was sent to the East. Along with his many accomplishments in the fields of archaeology, linguistics and various branches of humanities, Hansen also harboured an open secret about his sexuality, bedding young girls and boys alike.

Having been recalled to Rome for indoctrination and subsequently sent back to a harsh master of his Order, Hansen later went berserk on his colleagues due to his confinement and disappeared in Southern Asia. After a certain period, he presented himself to the British authorities, offering his vast knowledge of the Orient for espionage. Due to the unconventional and unmotorised guerrilla tactics of locals, Hansen's services were invaluable to the British, who had no material presence in the region, and sold his intelligence to the Americans who were knee-deep in conflict against the Viet Cong.

However, at some point Hansen disappears without notice and is later given up for dead, in view of the total eradication of hill villages in the region. Later, local residency catches sight of Hansen through one of their informants who had been working closely with the local head of station, Rumbelow. Despite his distaste for Rumbelow, whom he views as sleazy and thoroughly perfidious, Ned tracks down Hansen, who is working as the bouncer in a brothel.

Hansen recounts that he learned that he had an illegitimate daughter who was captured by a revolutionary band in Cambodia. Hansen allowed himself to be taken prisoner as well, intending to rescue her, but was horrified when she was genuinely converted to their ideals, and denounced him as a spy and a traitor.

After a hellish journey through the Cambodian jungle, Hansen eventually escaped after his daughter went missing from the band. She is now a prostitute in the brothel, her psyche damaged by her experiences in the jungle. Hansen wants nothing more to do with the Circus, with England, or with any political cause – his sole purpose in life is to watch over her. Despite Ned's offer of gratuity of $50,000, Hansen turns it down and chastises Ned – and by extension, all representation of Western imperialism – for their treatment of Asia. On his way back to London, Ned fancies the idea of sending Rumbelow, and in fact the whole Circus, Smiley included, on Hansen's trail for them to witness true and unfaltering devotion, as he regarded Hansen as the champion of his ambiguous and conflicted emotions about his calling in life.

Ned returns to London, having set his own misgivings to rest, finding them insignificant next to Hansen's suffering, and his single-minded devotion to his daughter. A few years later (during the events of The Russia House), when "Barley" Blair betrays the Circus to save a Russian woman he has fallen in love with, Ned is unable to muster the same outrage as his superiors.

=== Part nine ===
One of Ned's more amoral students is trying to get Smiley to agree that espionage gives its practitioners license to do anything, if it is necessary to get the job done. Smiley refuses to be pinned down, remarking that it is important for spies to feel conflicted about their own actions – and if any of them in the midst of an operation feel the impulse to act humanely, he hopes they will give it a fair hearing.

After being relieved of his position as head of the Russia House, Ned is sent to the "Interrogators' Pool," a division not held in high regard within the service. In addition to supplying interrogators to debrief defectors or captured enemy agents, the Pool acts as a clearing-house for suspicious members of the public who believe they have relevant information for the government.

While browsing through the Pool's old files, Ned is excited to find an old record from Smiley's tenure there (after being relieved of his position as Chief at the end of The Honourable Schoolboy). Smiley interviewed a retired British Army sergeant who wanted to know if it was true that his recently deceased son was actually a top-class undercover agent in Russia? The sergeant and his wife always believed their son was just a convict, but during the father's last visit, shortly before his son's death (apparently in a prison riot), the son claimed that his criminal identity was just a cover for his secret agent work.

Despite his inner scepticism, Smiley does his best to verify or disprove the boy's story. After an exhaustive search through the records of the Circus and other British government agencies, and a review of the boy's extensive criminal record, Smiley is forced to conclude that the boy was "an irredeemable and habitual monster," that his sordid death was no more than he deserved, and he has never had the slightest connection with the Circus or any other government service.

However, when the sergeant and his wife return for a second interview with Smiley, he tells them that, officially, the British government denies any knowledge of his son, while unofficially he gives them a set of superb gold cufflinks – one of the fanciful details of the son's story was that he and other top class agents were issued with special cufflinks instead of medals. The elderly couple departs the office, swelling with pride at their son's heroism.

Ned later learns that the cufflinks were an anniversary gift from Smiley's wife, Ann. At first glance, George's motives seemed clear: sentimentality, or spitefulness towards his unfaithful wife and the Circus that was rejecting him. But Ned's private theory is that Smiley, who was ambivalent at the best of times about the usefulness of the Circus's work, wanted to carry out an "intelligence operation" that clearly succeeded in achieving something good.

=== Part ten ===
Smiley likens some interrogations to communions between damaged souls, referring to his debriefing of his old nemesis, Karla.

During his tenure at the Interrogator's Pool, Ned receives an anonymous letter of denunciation against Cyril Arthur Frewin, a Foreign Office cipher clerk who had allegedly been keeping company with Sergei Modrian, a Soviet handler with whom Ned had a brush in the Russia House. After being briefed by Leonard Burr, the new Chief, Ned interviews Frewin's section head at the Foreign Office, alongside his associates from the Circus, for further information on Frewin. After learning of Frewin's annual vacations (and his constant disappearances from his hotel in Salzburg, Austria) Ned confronts Frewin.

Ned edges up Frewin's radio language courses in Russian and his Eastern Bloc contacts, attempting to verify the contents of the letter of denunciation he had received, aided by the findings of Toby Esterhase and Monty Arbuck, whom Ned had requested to make inquiries. After much deliberation, Ned has Frewin admit his collaboration with Sergei Modrian as a result of Frewin's participation in the Radio Moscow's Russian language course. After writing to the Radio Moscow programme a veiled account of his life, Sergei Modrian had shown up at Frewin's house as a "gift" for Frewin's "success" in his Russian language progress. Eventually, Modrian manipulates Frewin's solitude into betrayal as Modrian "regretfully" asked for intelligence material from Frewin's access to top secret and above.

However, shortly before Frewin's denunciation, Modrian returns to Moscow and reveals to Frewin that their relationship is over. Frewin becomes despondent and depressed, leading him to denounce himself in hopes of getting in touch with somebody who would replace Modrian in his life. Frewin reveals to Ned all his equipment provided by Moscow Centre, including a custom-made pair of opera binoculars that doubled as a covert camera.

=== Part eleven ===
Smiley completes his lecture, preparing to take his leave from Sarratt, along with the secret world as well. His last advice to the new recruits is to leave the old timers – like Smiley himself – and find new people to look up to.

A few days before his retirement from his tenure as Chief Leonard Burr's Secretary, Ned is given a last assignment. Burr orders Ned to negotiate with Sir Anthony Bradshaw, a venture-capitalist who had been enabled by former Circus chief, Sir Percy Alleline, to expand his financial empire while helping the Circus. However, after Alleline's disgrace and demise, Bradshaw began ferrying weaponry to various regions, such as the Balkans and Central Africa, to profit from the conflicts there. Ned makes his way to Bradshaw's sumptuous country estate and politely warns him to desist from his war-profiteering activities. Bradshaw is unfazed, as he knows more about the workings of the government than he's supposed to know. He defends his ferocious profiteering policies and Ned regretfully realises that despite his years in the secret world, he was not prepared for this "wrecking infant in our midst".

Ned closes his life in the Service in a kind of retirement in the country with Mabel. "I think a lot. I’m stepping out with my reading. I talk to people, ride on buses. I’m a newcomer to the overt world, but I’m learning."

== Common themes ==
Smiley's sections of the book are quite brief; the bulk of the book consists of Ned's reminiscences, prompted by his interpretation of tangential comments made by Smiley and illuminated from his own experiences. At the end of the penultimate chapter, Smiley instructs them not to invite him again.

The final chapter is unconnected with Smiley; Ned recollects Leonard Burr, who appears in the novel The Night Manager, foreshadowing, in retrospect, the development of that story.

The themes of the book are Smiley's sense of the moral ambiguity of spying, and Ned's growing self-awareness.

== Characters ==
The following characters appear throughout the novel, as people in British Intelligence and in the narrator Ned's life:

- Ned: The protagonist, an elder Circus member and the retired director of Sarratt training programme. Son of an Anglo-Dutch mother whose husband was killed during the Second World War, Ned was brought up by her mother and her relatives, eventually joining British Intelligence. Recruited in the early 1960s, Ned's career prospects waxed and waned through the turmoil of the Cold War. Readers never actually learn Ned's surname. Although Monty Arbuck calls him "College," that seems to be a way for Monty to try to take Ned down a peg: in Part One Ned is the "college kid" who has been assigned to the hard-working, more blue-collar class, career-long surveillance crew.
- George Smiley: Ned's guest of honour, Smiley is widely considered to be the legend of the Service. A venerated member of the Circus, Smiley served through the Second World War and the subsequent Cold War with distinction. His self-effacing personal manner belies his cunning, his comprehensive memory and capability for professional ruthlessness, while he displays kindness and good manners.
- Toby Esterhase: Hungarian-born former head of Lamplighter Section (which deals with surveillance). Later Ned's desk officer and subsequently Head of Station in Vienna. Toby is said to have an infinite capacity for survival, which explains his tenure even after his cohorts were disgraced after Bill Haydon's betrayal.
- Leonard Burr: Chief of Circus and Ned's immediate boss. Defined as absurdly young for his job, Burr is claimed to be George Smiley's crown prince for years after being saved by Smiley from 'a fate worse than death' at All Souls.
- Personnel: The eponymous head of Circus staff who distributes assignments and conducts inquiries.
- Monty Arbuck: Head of the Watchers, who briefs and commands Circus clandestine observation teams.
- Mabel: Ned's wife. Although he has been unfaithful to her many times, and they are separated for a while, at the conclusion they are maintaining a mostly comfortable marriage.
