= Toby Esterhase =

Fictional character in John Le Carré's novels

- First appearance: Tinker Tailor Soldier Spy
- Last appearance: A Legacy of Spies
- Created by: John le Carré

In-universe information
- Gender: Male
- Occupation: Intelligence officer
- Affiliation: The Circus
- Nationality: Hungarian; British

Toby Esterhase is a fictional character who appears in several of John le Carré's spy novels that feature George Smiley, including Tinker Tailor Soldier Spy, The Honourable Schoolboy, Smiley's People, and The Secret Pilgrim. Esterhase also makes a cameo appearance in Le Carré's A Legacy of Spies.

Esterhase is an intelligence officer in The Circus, le Carré's fictionalized version of MI6. He is the head of the Lamplighters, the section of The Circus responsible for surveillance and wiretapping. Hungarian by birth, Esterhase is an Anglophile with pretensions of being a British gentleman. He often involves himself in either morally questionable or outright criminal plots, although his superiors look the other way due to his high level of competence and loyalty to the service. Initially something of an antagonist to Smiley, due to his loyalty to Smiley's bureaucratic nemesis Percy Alleline, Esterhase ultimately switches allegiances and becomes one of Smiley's top lieutenants, aiding him in a number of high-profile intelligence missions.

== Character ==
Esterhase is exceptionally short; he's called "Tiny Tobe" by colleague Connie Sachs and known around The Circus as "Snow White" for his meticulously maintained white hair, which he covers with a net when he sleeps. He further gained the nickname "Our shadow foreign secretary" from Bill Haydon, probably on account of his foreign birth and linguistic ability. Esterhase is known for multiple eccentricities, including "dressing like a male model," washing his own clothes rather than having them laundered, never smiling, and sending all of his colleagues bottles of alcohol for Christmas. He has a unique manner of speech which vacillates between ultra-correct English and unusual syntax. Esterhase's former espionage partner, Peter Guillam, indicates that he's something of a polyglot, musing "Toby spoke no known language perfectly, but he spoke them all." In The Secret Pilgrim, though, he is seen to speak fluent Hungarian to a pair of fellow expatriates, during which the narrator Ned notes that he becomes more animate and expressive than when speaking any other language. Guillam further recounts that Esterhase appears impervious to fear, recalling an incident in which he stopped to tip several Swiss hotel employees while fleeing would-be captors.

During the events of Tinker, Tailor, Soldier, Spy, Esterhase has a son at Westminster and a daughter at medical school. He is married, but has a reputation as a womanizer. No information is ever given about his wife or the circumstances of his marriage except her given name Mara.

Despite his odd behaviour, Esterhase proves himself to be a valuable spy and extremely competent at his job; characters often find themselves conflicted between being put off by his eccentricity and being glad to have him on their side. He has also endeared himself to those around him due to his genuine affection for Smiley, even though they sometimes clash professionally, and his unwavering loyalty to England in general and the Circus in particular. Esterhase is particularly adept as the head of Lamplighters, the division of the Circus responsible for surveillance, wiretapping, and maintaining safe houses. Esterhase personally assembled the Lamplighters by recruiting housewives, vagabonds, and other individuals whom no one would suspect of espionage work, and honing them into an efficient, tightly knit unit that becomes something of a surrogate family for them. He runs the Lamplighters from an office in the back of a launderette, which functions as a cover for their base of operations.

Esterhase is motivated by a desire to be accepted by his peers as a true English gentleman, a weakness exploited by Percy Alleline to coax Toby into supporting him in a coup against Control, the head of the Circus. Smiley later uses the same desire for acceptance to convince Esterhase to switch alliances and support him in exposing Alleline as a fraud whose arrogance has blinded him to the presence of a mole in his inner circle. Esterhase also has a penchant for making extra money on the side through small-time criminal enterprises, nominally selling forged art. Those around him look the other way due to his competence and value as a spy.

== History ==
A Hungarian national, Toby Esterhase was recruited by George Smiley at some point during the course of the Second World War. Smiley found Esterhase in Vienna, a starving student living in the ruins of a museum of which his late uncle had been curator. Esterhase is potentially of a noble background. The Esterházys held historic prominence in Hungary as one of the most significant land-owning families in the Austro-Hungarian Empire from the 17th century onwards, though Esterhase's reputation for deception makes it uncertain whether he was merely pretending to be affiliated with the family. This, however, is never specifically mentioned by le Carré.

The Circus paired Esterhase with Smiley's future protegé, Peter Guillam, for his first overseas operation, albeit to varying degrees of success. During a posting to Bern, Switzerland, for example, the pair came under suspicion for organising acts liable to be considered a seditious conspiracy by the local police and were forced to flee the country. Seemingly, however, Esterhase developed a solid reputation as an operative that enabled him to rise through the ranks of British Intelligence. Sometime prior to the events of Tinker Tailor Soldier Spy, he was made head of the Lamplighter section.

Following the failure of Operation Testify and the presumed death of Jim Prideaux in 1973, Esterhase supported Sir Percy Alleline's successful attempt to oust Control as Chief of the Circus. In the process, Esterhase also abandoned previous loyalties to Smiley, resulting in both men being forced into early retirement. Esterhase is one of the first people Smiley appeals to in his attempt to preserve Control's position, citing their past friendship; Esterhase demurs, citing Control's habit of allowing younger personnel to mistreat him. In the aftermath, Esterhase, Bill Haydon and Roy Bland form the "magic circle" alongside Alleline, using their exclusive access to "Merlin", a Soviet intelligence source handled by Operation "Witchcraft", to assume leadership of the Circus.

Unbeknownst to everyone except Prideaux and Haydon, Esterhase was one of five high-ranking officers under investigation by Control as a potential Soviet mole. However, Control was ousted and died of cancer before he could conclude the investigation. Under Alleline, Esterhase refocused almost the entire Lamplighter section to support Operation Witchcraft, unaware the operation is actually a disinformation campaign orchestrated by Soviet spymaster Karla. Esterhase's own role is to pretend to be a Soviet mole when meeting with the Soviets. They know he is not, but his pretense provides a cover story for Alleline, Bland, and Esterhase himself, justifying his role as a courier between the real mole, Haydon, and his Soviet controllers. After patient investigation, Smiley interviews Esterhase in private, in a safe house meeting to which he has been lured on a pretext by Peter Guillam. After realizing that he's been taken advantage of, and that Smiley has the official backing of Whitehall, Esterhase helps Smiley entrap the real mole, Bill Haydon. In the aftermath of Haydon's exposure, Esterhase and the rest of the magic circle are disgraced.

Despite being disgraced in the wake of Witchcraft's failure, it is revealed in The Honourable Schoolboy that Esterhase is the only survivor of the operational fallout. Haydon is killed before he can be traded to the Soviet Union, presumably by Prideaux, whilst Alleline and Bland are disgraced and forced out of the Service. Esterhase, however, is demoted to a surveillance agent role accompanying Smiley's lieutenants to record their conversations with witnesses and sources.

By 1977, the year of Smiley's People, Esterhase is retired from British Intelligence and operates a second-rate art gallery in London selling forgeries of Edgar Degas and other artists. During this time, he is approached to assist with a private operation by Vladimir, an Estonian dissident and ex-Circus asset formerly run by Esterhase and Smiley. Esterhase refuses and Vladimir is subsequently assassinated by the Thirteenth Directorate, Karla's specialist KGB division. When Smiley exits retirement to investigate, Esterhase somewhat shamefacedly recounts their meeting.

When Vladimir's death leads Smiley to a possible means of trapping Karla, he recruits Esterhase for an espionage operation in Bern, to capture and interrogate one of Karla's agents. Esterhase serves as Smiley's field commander, reactivating the Lamplighters to follow, investigate, and eventually trap the Soviet spy in question—to use Smiley's theatrical analogy, Smiley writes the show, and Esterhase produces it—a job he performs superbly. He is also with Smiley in Berlin when Karla defects to the West and surrenders himself to Circus custody.

Esterhase is a minor character in the short-story collection The Secret Pilgrim, occasionally referenced by the book's narrator, Ned. The book reveals that, between the time of The Honourable Schoolboy and Smiley's People, he became the head of the Circus' Vienna office. Esterhase is one of the central characters in a farcical vignette in which he gets rid of a charlatan—an exiled Hungarian professor based in Munich, who provides the British with virtually worthless information—by successfully convincing the CIA that he is a dauntless anti-Communist hero. Although Ned is infuriated by the incident, Smiley dismisses it as amusing. Esterhase reappears at the end of the novel to attend a speech given by Smiley, standing out from the crowd in an ostentatious tuxedo.

Esterhase is briefly mentioned in a cameo role in A Legacy of Spies where he, together with Percy Alleline and Roy Bland, meet Peter Guillam at the field dispatch office at Heathrow Airport during a flashback; whether Toby is still alive in the present day is not revealed.

== Inspiration ==
According to Adam Sisman, the character of Esterhase was partly inspired by the Hungarian emigre and book publisher André Deutsch:

When David [i.e. Le Carré] came to write his novel Tinker, Tailor, Soldier, Spy, he would draw on Deutsch for his character Toby Esterhase, who like his original would speak his own form of English.

—

Le Carré described double agent George Blake as another part-inspiration, feeling some sympathy for "the wretched man" on account of his status as an outsider ("half a Dutchman and half a Jew") in the British intelligence establishment.

== In other media ==
Bernard Hepton played Esterhase in the BBC television dramatisations of Tinker Tailor Soldier Spy and Smiley's People. In the former, Hepton played Esterhase as speaking with a received pronunciation accent, but in Smiley's People, Hepton reverted to an Eastern European accent for the role.

Charles Kay played Esterhase in the BBC radio dramatisations of Tinker Tailor Soldier Spy and Smiley's People.

David Dencik played Esterhase in the 2011 film version of Tinker Tailor Soldier Spy. Dencik's Esterhase spoke with a subtle but difficult-to-place Eastern European accent. The details of Esterhase's past are altered slightly in the film: it was Control, rather than Smiley, who first recruited Esterhase in Vienna. When Smiley confronts Esterhase about Operation Witchcraft, he states that Esterhase was a "wanted man" at the time of his recruitment and implies that Esterhase is still a fugitive. Although it is not specified why or by whom Esterhase is wanted, it is suggested that his fugitive status may have to do with his "war experience," which Smiley cryptically states Esterhase "survived [...] because of [his] ability to change sides, serve any master."

Goran Bogdan will play Esterhase in the television series Legacy of Spies.
