= Rich and Poor =

Rich and Poor may refer to:

- Economic inequality, unequal distribution of income or wealth between different groups
- Un povero ricco, 1983 Italian comedy film
- Rich and Poor (TV series), Iranian TV series
- Amir Garib (lit. 'Rich and Poor'), a 1974 Indian Hindi-language film
- Amiri Garibi (lit. 'Rich and Poor'), a 1990 Indian Hindi-language film

== See also ==
- Rich Man, Poor Man (disambiguation)
