= Tinker Tailor Soldier Spy (film) =

2011 film based on John le Carré's novel

- British theatrical release poster
- Directed by: Tomas Alfredson
- Screenplay by: Bridget O'Connor; Peter Straughan
- Based on: Tinker Tailor Soldier Spy by John le Carré
- Produced by: Tim Bevan; Eric Fellner; Robyn Slovo; Peter Morgan
- Starring: Gary Oldman; Kathy Burke; Benedict Cumberbatch; David Dencik; Colin Firth; Stephen Graham; Tom Hardy; Mark Strong; John Hurt; Toby Jones; Simon McBurney; Ciarán Hinds
- Cinematography: Hoyte van Hoytema
- Edited by: Dino Jonsäter
- Music by: Alberto Iglesias
- Production companies: StudioCanal; Karla Films; Paradis Films; Kinowelt Filmproduktion; Working Title Films
- Distributed by: StudioCanal
- Release dates: 5 September 2011 (Venice); 16 September 2011 (United Kingdom); 2 February 2012 (Germany); 8 February 2012 (France)
- Running time: 127 minutes
- Countries: United Kingdom; France; Germany
- Language: English
- Budget: $21 million
- Box office: $81.2 million

Tinker Tailor Soldier Spy is a 2011 British Cold War spy film directed by Tomas Alfredson. The screenplay was written by Bridget O'Connor and Peter Straughan, based on John le Carré's 1974 novel of the same name. The film stars an ensemble cast led by Gary Oldman as George Smiley, with Colin Firth, Tom Hardy, John Hurt, Toby Jones, Mark Strong, Benedict Cumberbatch, Ciarán Hinds, David Dencik and Kathy Burke. It is set in London in the early 1970s and follows the hunt for a Soviet double agent at the top of the British secret service. The novel had previously been adapted into the award-winning 1979 BBC television series of the same name in which Alec Guinness played the lead role of Smiley.

The film was produced through the British company Working Title Films and financed by France's StudioCanal. It premiered in competition at the 68th Venice International Film Festival. A critical and commercial success, it was the highest-grossing film at the British box office for three consecutive weeks. It won three BAFTA Awards including Outstanding British Film and received three Oscar nominations: Best Adapted Screenplay, Best Original Score, and for Oldman, Best Actor. It has featured on several critics' lists as one of the best films of its era.

== Plot ==
In 1973, "Control", head of British intelligence ("The Circus"), sends Jim Prideaux to Budapest to meet a Hungarian general who has the name of a mole at the top of British Intelligence. Prideaux realises the meeting is a trap, but is shot as he tries to flee. Control and his right-hand man, George Smiley, are forced to retire, and Control dies soon after. Sir Percy Alleline becomes the new Chief, with Bill Haydon, Roy Bland, and Toby Esterhase the other remaining Circus leaders. The four had already begun receiving Soviet intelligence from a secret source (Operation "Witchcraft").

Field agent Ricki Tarr warns Permanent Undersecretary Oliver Lacon that there is a mole among the Circus leadership. Knowing that Control had the same theory, Lacon asks Smiley to investigate, and he agrees on the condition that Tarr's boss Peter Guillam and retired Special Branch officer Mendel join the investigation. Guillam obtains personnel and financial records from the Circus showing that staff loyal to Control had been forced out, and Smiley interviews analyst Connie Sachs, who was sacked after deducing that Soviet cultural attaché Alexei Polyakov was a military officer and suspecting he was running a mole in London.

Tarr tells Smiley that in Istanbul, his lover Soviet agent Irina offered to exchange the identity of the mole in return for asylum. Hours after Tarr cabled London that a Soviet defector could identify a double agent, the local station chief was murdered, Irina was abducted and Tarr went into hiding. Smiley sends Guillam to steal the duty officer's logbook for that night. Guillam is unexpectedly brought before Circus leadership and told that Tarr is a traitor. Smiley finds that the logbook pages for the relevant night have been removed, convincing Smiley that the mole is trying to discredit Tarr.

Former duty officer Jerry Westerby tells Smiley that when he reported Prideaux's shooting, Control was unresponsive, so Westerby called Smiley's house and left a message with his wife Ann, after which Haydon arrived and took charge. Guillam wonders how Haydon could have learned of the emergency; Smiley reveals that Haydon was Ann's lover.

Smiley finds Prideaux, alive and working as a schoolmaster, who reveals his Budapest mission was to relay the identity of the mole to Control, via one of the code names from the nursery rhyme "Tinker, Tailor" assigned by Control to each member of the Circus suspected to be the mole—"Tinker", "Tailor", "Soldier", "Poorman" and "Beggarman". Instead, he was tortured by the KGB, saw Irina shot in front of him, and was interrogated by Karla on how advanced Control's suspicions of a mole were.

Smiley informs Lacon and the Minister that Operation Witchcraft is a ruse: that instead of Polyakov bringing them genuine Russian secrets, the mole is passing Polyakov British secrets for Karla, who has designed the Witchcraft material to lure the CIA into sharing intelligence with Britain, which the mole can pass to him.

Smiley threatens Esterhase with deportation to obtain the Witchcraft safe house address. Tarr visits the Paris station and informs London that he has vital information about the security of the Circus. Smiley waits at the safe house for the mole to alert Polyakov that Tarr is about to blow their cover. The mole is revealed to be Haydon, whom Smiley holds at gunpoint. In detention, Smiley confronts Haydon who confirms that he seduced Ann on Karla's orders to cloud Smiley's judgment. Prideaux shoots Haydon dead from a distance. Ann returns home, and Smiley returns to the Circus as its Chief.

== Cast ==
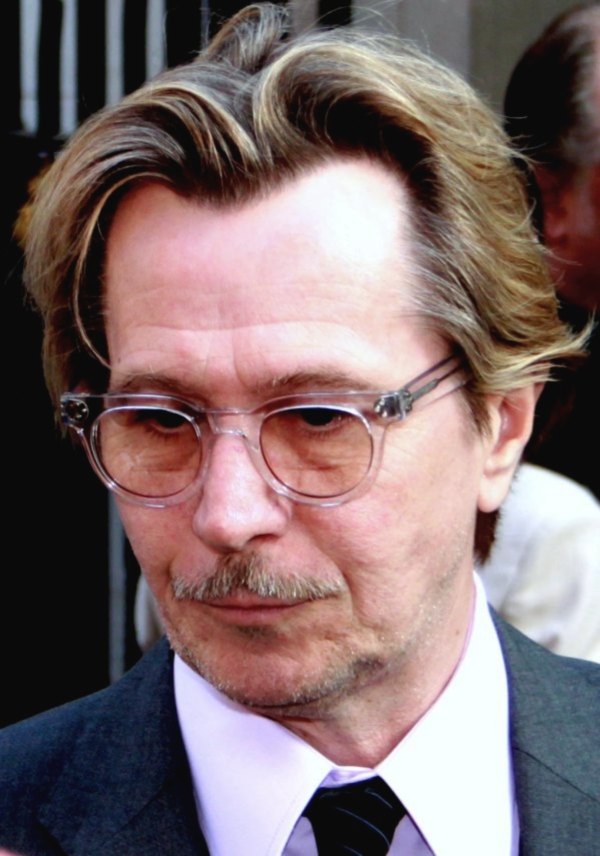
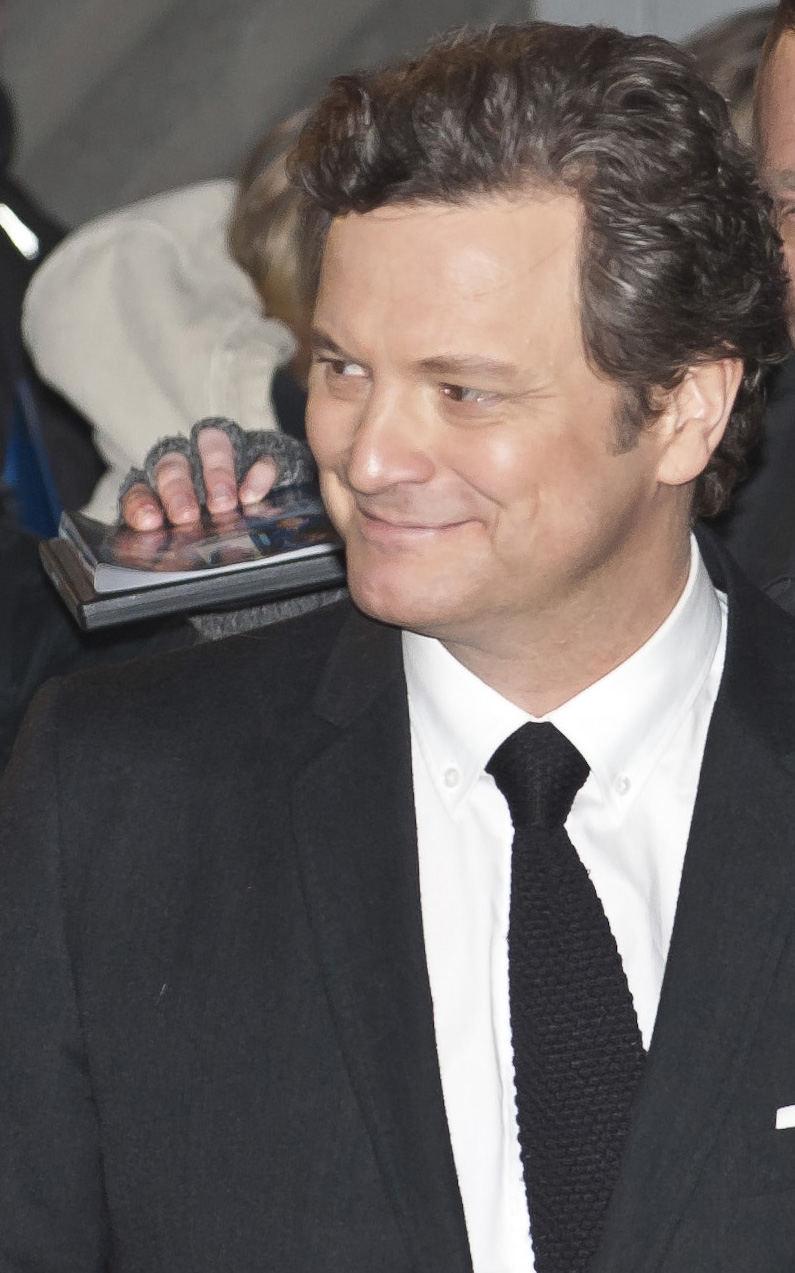
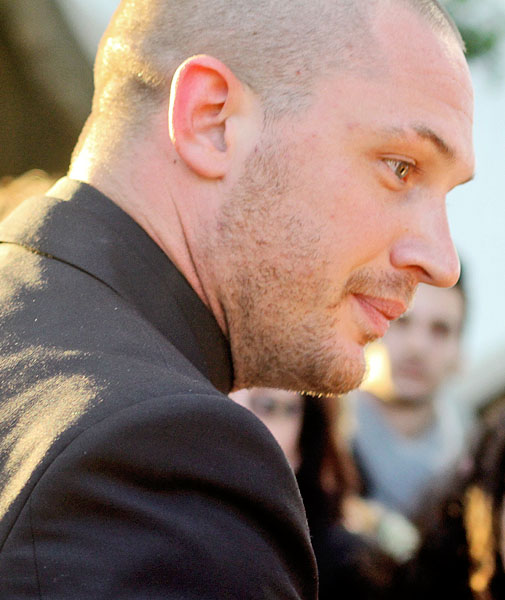
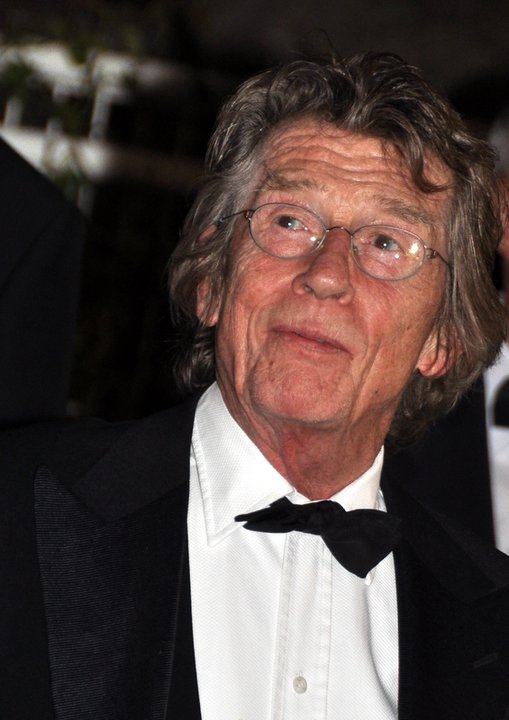
Gary Oldman, Colin Firth, Tom Hardy, and John Hurt (all in 2011)
- Gary Oldman as George Smiley
- Colin Firth as Bill Haydon
- Tom Hardy as Ricki Tarr
- John Hurt as Control
- Toby Jones as Percy Alleline
- Mark Strong as Jim Prideaux
- Benedict Cumberbatch as Peter Guillam
- Ciarán Hinds as Roy Bland
- David Dencik as Toby Esterhase
- Kathy Burke as Connie Sachs
- Stephen Graham as Jerry Westerby
- Simon McBurney as Oliver Lacon
- Svetlana Khodchenkova as Irina
- Roger Lloyd-Pack as Mendel
- Konstantin Khabensky as Alexei Polyakov
- Christian McKay as Mackelvore
- Zoltán Mucsi as Magyar
- Michael Sarne as voice of Karla
- John le Carré as Christmas party guest
- Katrina Vasilieva as Ann Smiley
- Laura Carmichael as Sal
- Phillip Martin Brown as Tufty Thesinger
- William Haddock as Bill Roach
- Stuart Graham as The Minister

== Production ==
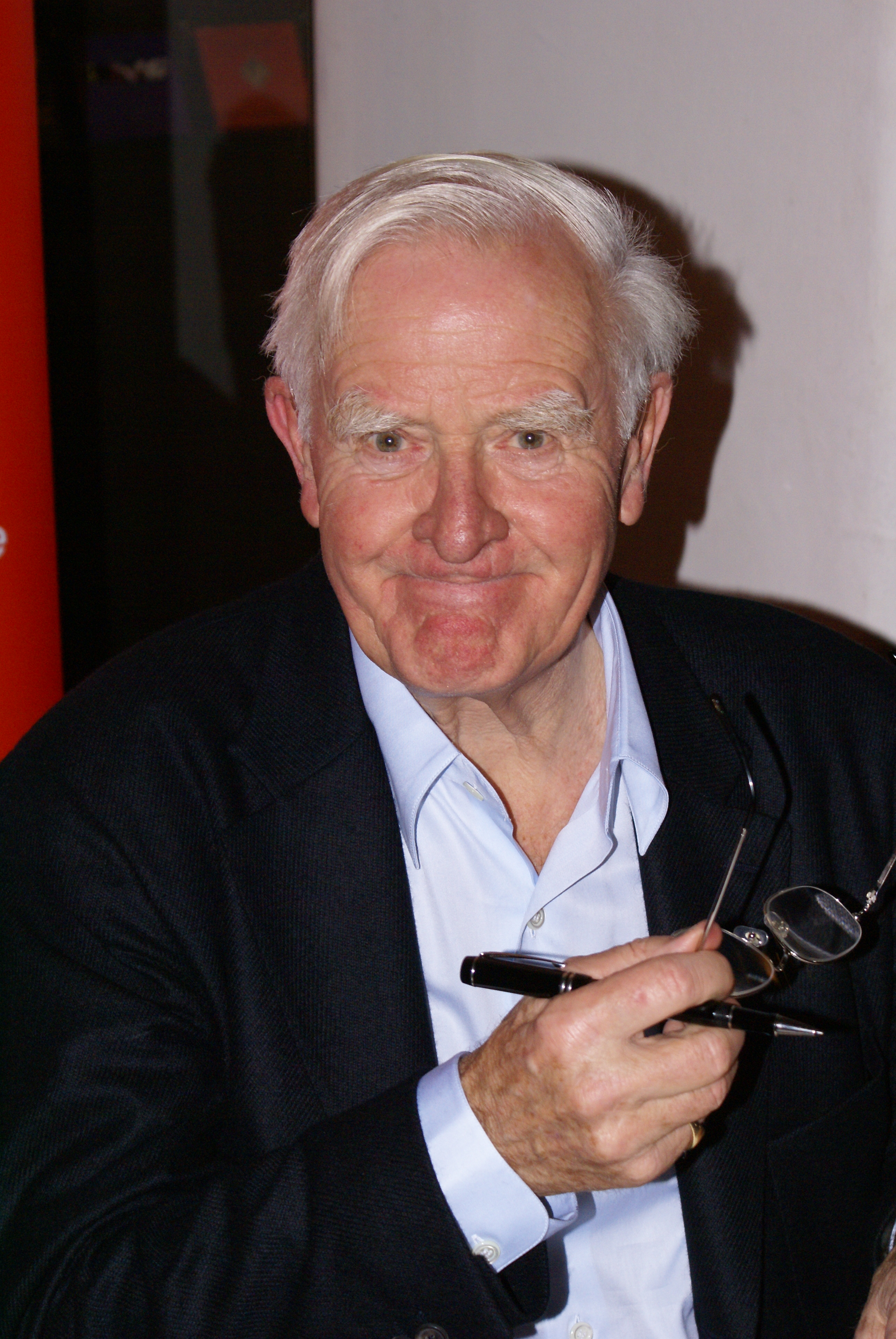
Author John le Carré (pictured in 2008), who wrote the novel of the same name from which the film was adapted, provided production design input and a cameo appearance, and remarked of the final release "I'm chuffed to fuck."

=== Development ===
The project was initiated by Peter Morgan when he wrote a draft of the screenplay which he offered to Working Title Films to produce. Morgan dropped out as the writer for personal reasons (but still served as an executive producer), and Working Title hired Peter Straughan and Bridget O'Connor to redraft the script, which took a year to finalise. The film was backed financially by France's StudioCanal and had a budget corresponding to $21 million. It is dedicated to O'Connor, who died of cancer during production.

=== Writing ===
The writers were daunted by the "shadow" of the highly regarded 1979 BBC television adaptation (which they watched once in preparation), and by the novel itself. Although finding the novel a "fantastically rich reading experience" and being encouraged by le Carré's belief it could work as a film, the lack of heroic figures, plot complexity and moral murkiness made it for Straughan "a horrendously difficult prospect for film adaptation".

The writers worked by dividing the novel into fragments, then reordering them, adding new scenes and imagery (mostly invented by O'Connor) at points where the format of film called for them. One of the most significant changes from the novel and television adaptation was not to start the film with a long flashback to Ricki Tarr's story, and instead choosing to use the beginning of the film to introduce the main character of Smiley. They decided not to give dialogue or direct screentime to the characters of Karla and Ann, on the basis that they were the most important characters to Smiley, and their occlusion would give them what Straughan called "a sort of magnetic power".

The writers found maintaining the tone and pace of the novel more challenging than doing justice to the plot within the limitations of a two hour film. They structured the ending of the film as two false finales–the revelation of the mole's identity as Haydon and Smiley's confrontation with him–escalating to the actual finale of Haydon and Prideaux's final meeting. Their drafts were greenlit after six months of writing, and they spent a further six months refining the script up until production.

=== Director ===
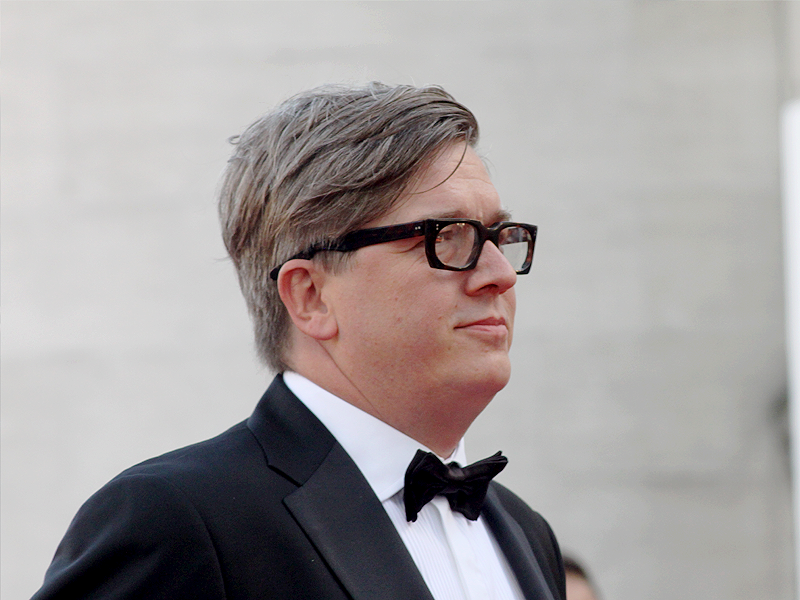
Director Tomas Alfredson pictured at the film's London premiere in September 2011. The film was Alfredson's second feature, and his first in the English language.

The producers considered British directors for the film, but they were put off by the reputation of the television adaptation. Park Chan-wook considered directing the film, but decided against it, later praising the finished work and remarking "I wasn’t confident about my ability to adapt it without damaging the original and was concerned about how to satisfy both people who watched the original and those who didn’t".

Tomas Alfredson was confirmed as the director in July 2009; the production was his first film in the English language, with which he lacked fluency. He was a reader of le Carré's work, and was drawn to the story by the tragedy, loneliness, sacrifice and betrayal the spy characters endured in the environment of the Cold War. Ahead of principal photography, Alfredson characterised the film as a horror film due to the viewer's uncertainty of the extent of the deceit at work.

=== Casting ===
==== George Smiley ====
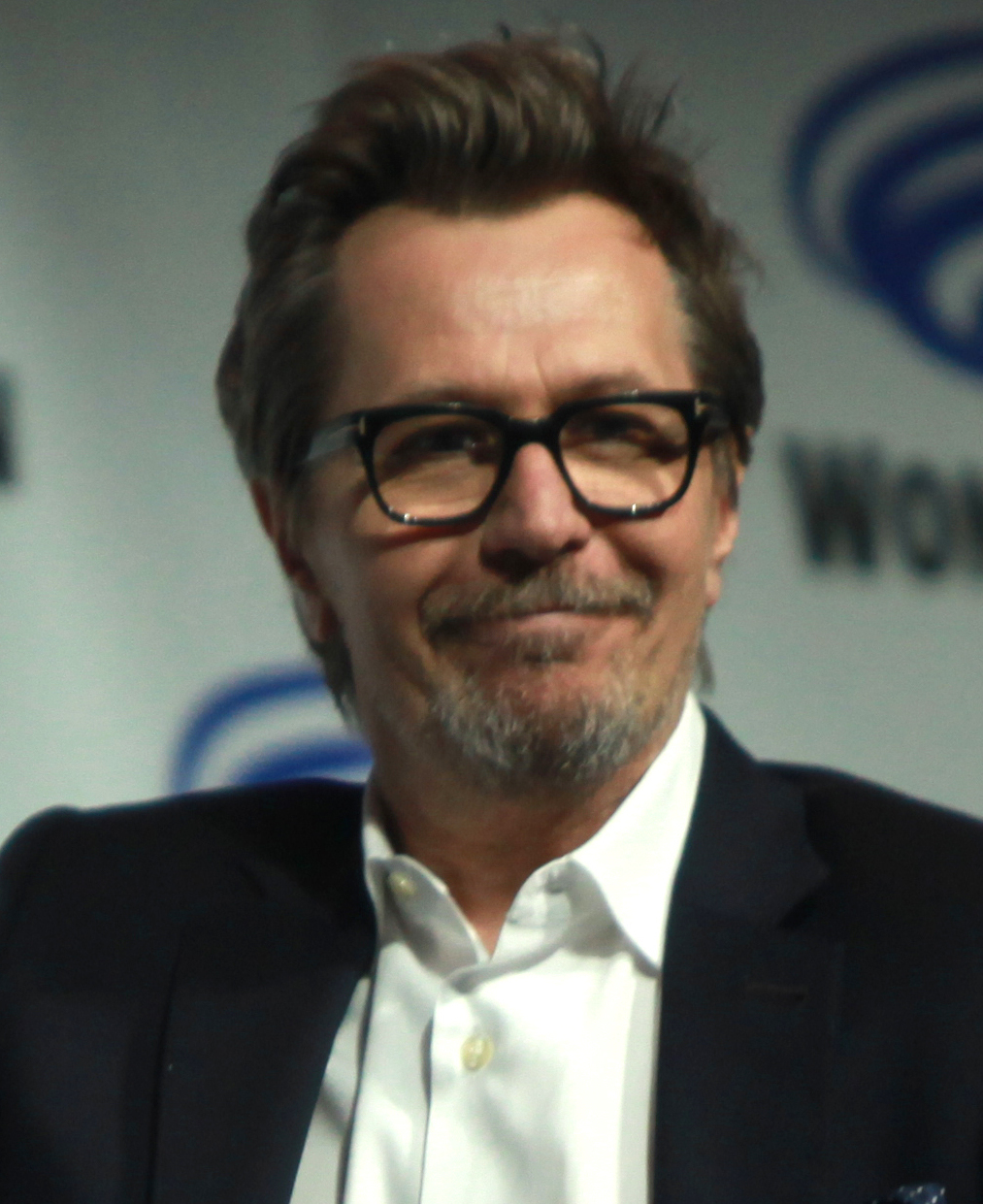
Sir Alec Guinness (left, pictured in 1973), whose iconic portrayal of main character George Smiley in the 1979 BBC television adaptation loomed large in the minds of Gary Oldman (right, pictured 2014) and the filmmakers during the film's development

Gary Oldman was cast in the role of George Smiley at the suggestion of producer Tim Bevan. Alfredson thought that he had "a great face" and "the quiet intensity and intelligence that's needed". Oldman was eager for the part, deeming it "a return to proper work" after having been typecast portraying fantasy characters such as Sirius Black and Commissioner Gordon in the preceding decade, but deliberated about taking the role for a month before bowing to pressure to accept.

Known for his larger-than-life performances, Oldman was attracted to the restraint of Smiley's character, saying "It was just a joy to be asked to play something as quiet as this and to run a scene from a passive position rather than physicalize the feelings and the emotions, which I’ve sometimes been asked to do." Oldman put on weight to depict the famously rotund Smiley.

Oldman had a reputation at the time as one of the best actors not to have won an Academy Award, which he would dispel a few years later by winning Best Actor for his performance as Winston Churchill in the 2017's Darkest Hour. Nevertheless, he was nervous about having to follow in the footsteps of Alec Guinness who had distinguished himself in the popular consciousness in his performance as Smiley in the television series, and deliberately did not watch the series after being cast to avoid it influencing his performance. Oldman harboured doubts about his suitability for the role throughout preproduction, and called Alfredson one week into filming to say "Maybe I'm not your man" before being convinced to continue.

==== Supporting cast ====
Many actors were connected to the other roles at various points, but only days before filming started, Oldman was still the only lead actor who officially had been contracted:

We had to have [Smiley] in place first. And we were almost panicking because we couldn’t get the right idea to place George. The problem with George is that he is described as someone you would immediately forget. You know, anyone’s uncle. And to find an actor who could not be boring, but depict boredom or dullness – that was the trick. If you look at what Gary [Oldman] has done through the years, he’s very much a chameleon. And he was the perfect chameleon for us. So I went to Los Angeles with a very short list with one name on it, and we met and connected very well. And then we started the rest of the casting process. But [the rest] was quite easy. It just fell very naturally in place. I think [about 95%] of the cast were [our first choices].

— Tomas Alfredson, December 2011 interview

David Thewlis was rumoured to be in the running for a role. Ralph Fiennes was reported in July 2010 to have a starring role. Michael Fassbender was in talks at one point to play Ricki Tarr, but the shooting schedule conflicted with his work on X-Men: First Class; Tom Hardy was cast instead. On 17 September 2010, Mark Strong was confirmed to have joined the cast. Jared Harris was cast but had to drop out because of scheduling conflicts with Sherlock Holmes: A Game of Shadows; he was replaced by Toby Jones. John le Carré appears in a cameo as an attendee in the Christmas party scene.

=== Production design ===
The filmmakers struggled to find a production designer before deciding on Maria Djurkovic. They consulted fashion designer Paul Smith and le Carré on the production design, with le Carré specifying details such as how the office sets should look, what letterhead ought to be used, and the eccentric dress sense of some of his former spy colleagues.

Smiley's eyeglasses were a key design choice for costume designer Jacqueline Durran, Oldman and Alfredson, given their prominence on the face of a character the director was keen to portray as a voyeur; for this reason they eschewed the common practice of coating prop glasses to inhibit reflection. Oldman found the glasses that were eventually used: a plastic pair with thick rims, resembling Guinness' in the television adaptation. Smiley's clothing was inspired by a picture of Graham Greene which Alfredson supplied Durran.

Another design centerpiece was the Circus building, which they depicted using a CGI-manipulated exterior enclosing several floors of increasing importance and security. On the top floor was the leaders' conference room, a windowless enclosure modelled after a 1970s Portakabin and surrounded inside by striking orange soundproofing foam.

=== Cinematography ===
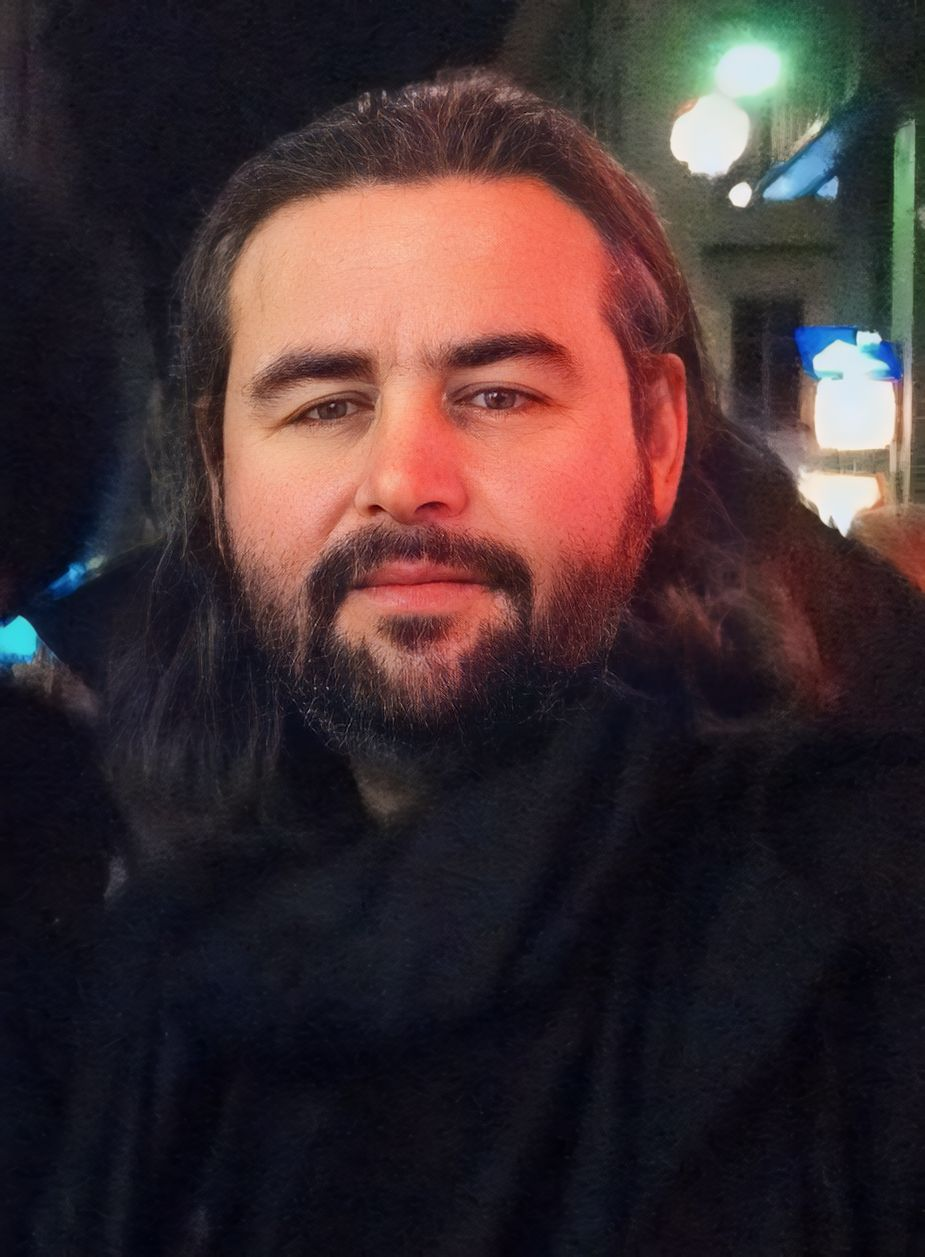
Hoyte van Hoytema (pictured in 2012) was the cinematographer for Tinker Tailor Soldier Spy as well as his and director Tomas Alfredson's feature film debut, Let the Right One In (2010)

Alfredson chose Hoyte van Hoytema as cinematographer for the film, having worked with him on Let the Right One In (2010), which was the first feature film for both. For the film's visual identity, they did not use the television adaptation for aesthetic inspiration. In describing his sense of the film's aesthetic to American Cinematographer, van Hoytema said it was "about the lonely players of the Circus, who operate in a desolate world where no one can be trusted. It is a melancholic world set in small rooms drenched in nicotine and bureacratic sweat."

The filmmakers sought to create an air of voyeurism, paranoia, and claustrophobia, making use of soft focus and muted tones, with a palette of beige, brown and gray. Straughan later recounted Alfredson's direction to van Hoytema that the film should "look like the smell of wet tweed" and "have the color of an old man's foreskin". They often filmed characters surrounded by cigarette smoke or showered in rain, shown through doors and windows or with a third character in the room.

=== Filming ===
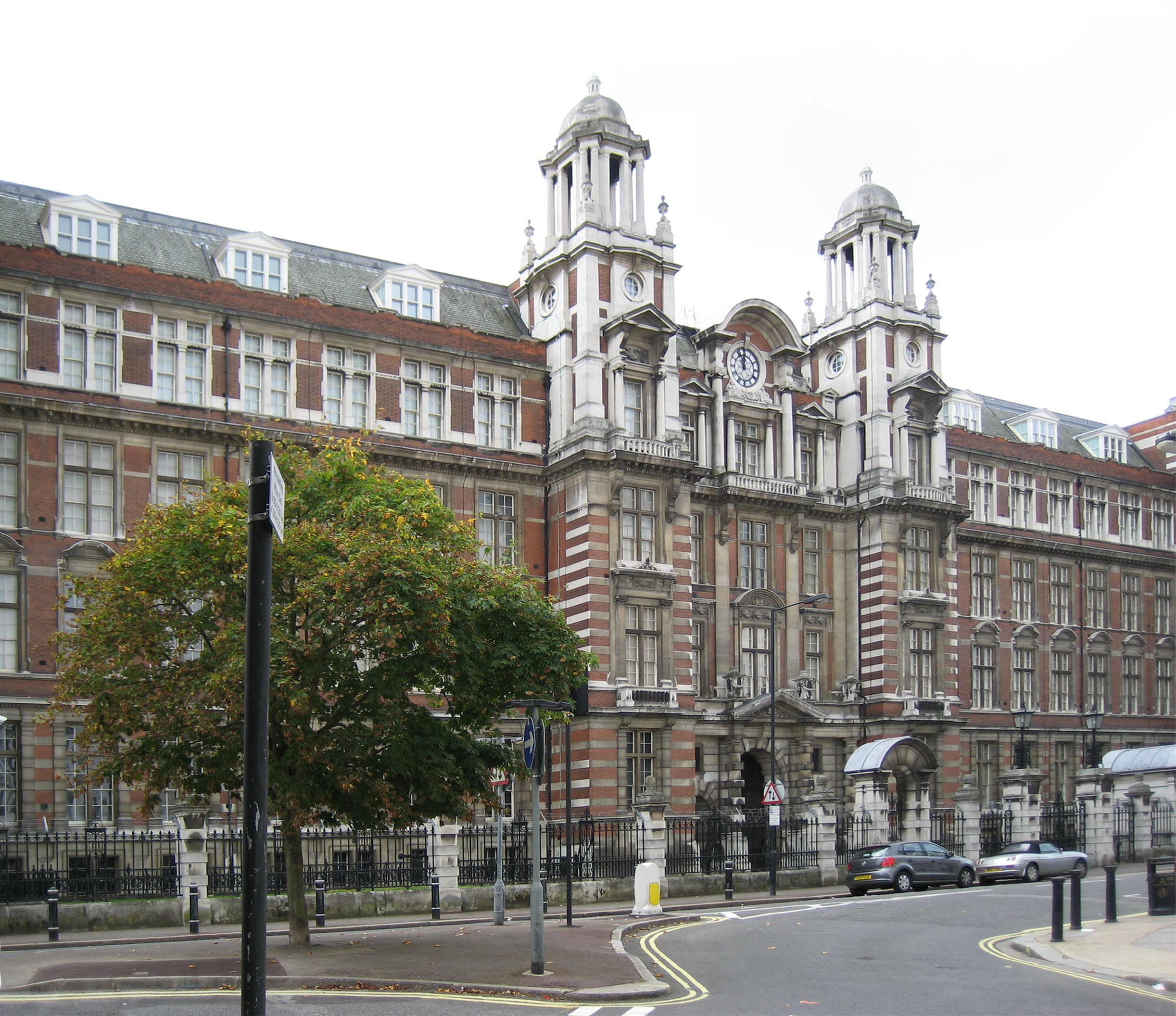
Blythe House, the exterior of "The Circus"

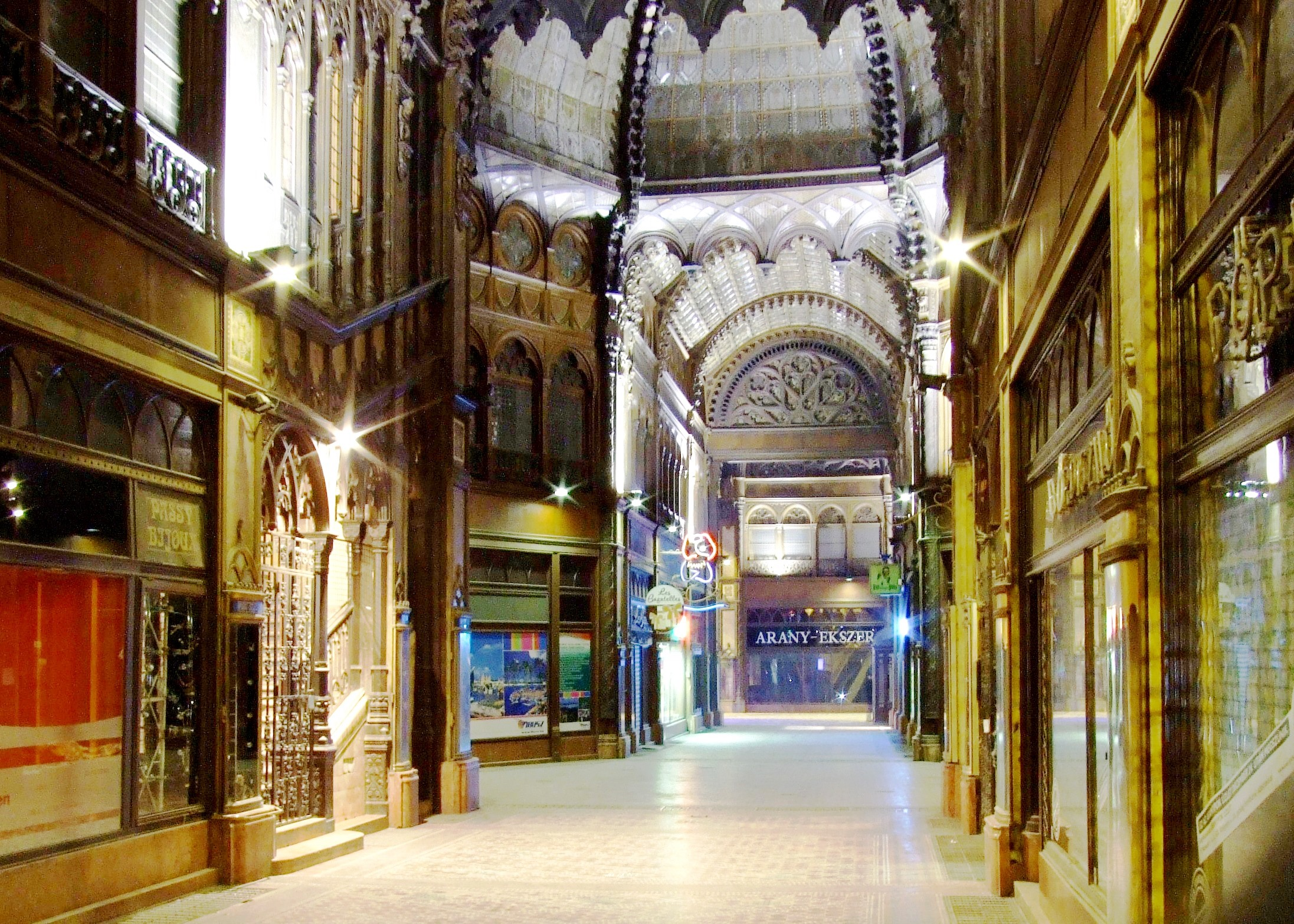
The Párizsi Udvar ("Paris Court") in Budapest, setting for the Hungarian café scene

Principal photography took place between 7 October and 22 December 2010. Most of the film was shot in London. Studio scenes were shot at Inglis Barracks, a former army barracks in Mill Hill. Exterior shots of "The Circus" were at Blythe House in West Kensington. The Merlin safe house scenes were filmed at Empress Coach Works in Cambridge Heath. Some exterior scenes were filmed on Hampstead Heath and in Hampstead Ponds, where Smiley is shown swimming. Some exterior shots were filmed in Kensington Gore, and interior scenes were filmed in Queen Alexandra's House and the physics department of Imperial College London, all in South Kensington.

The production filmed in Budapest for five days. Exterior shots included scenes at Fisherman's Bastion. The café scene in which Jim Prideaux is shot was filmed in the interior hall of Párizsi Udvar Hotel. The events which take place in Czechoslovakia in the novel were moved to Hungary, because of the country's 20% rebate for film productions. The production filmed in Istanbul for nine days, shortly before Christmas.

=== Music ===
The final song in the film, Julio Iglesias' rendition of the French song "La Mer", set against a visual montage of various characters and subplots being resolved as Smiley strides into Circus headquarters to assume command, was chosen because it was something the team thought George Smiley would listen to when he was alone; Alfredson described the song as "everything that the world of MI6 isn't". A scene in which Smiley listens to the song was filmed, but eventually cut to avoid giving it too much significance.

Heard at a Circus office party, sung along to by the guests, is "The Second Best Secret Agent in the Whole Wide World", composed by Sammy Cahn and Jimmy Van Heusen, and performed by Sammy Davis Jr., from the British spy spoof Licensed to Kill (1965). At the same office Christmas function, the Circus staff sing the official "State Anthem of the USSR", conducted by a figure dressed as Father Christmas but wearing a Lenin mask. Tinker Tailor Soldier Spy (Original Motion Picture Soundtrack), an album featuring Alberto Iglesias's score, was released by Silva Screen Records on 14 October 2011.

=== Editing ===
The production reunited Alfredson with editor Dino Jonsäter (sv), who like van Hoytema had worked on Let the Right One In. The editing was a difficult process; Alfredson reflected that the film "was a big, rough, grey block of stone quite late into the process until we got it shining". At one stage, the film had been cut to three and a half hours of material the filmmakers deemed essential, before the final 127 minute edit was completed. Of the final edit, Straughan was worried that audiences would not be attracted to a spy thriller that mostly featured people talking to one another.

== Themes and analysis ==
The stunted emotional lives and desperation of the spies was a major theme in the film; MSN Movies critic Kathleen Murphy remarked: "There’s no emotional exit in these Escher-like environs, no real “outside” or locus of everyday life, nothing beyond the Circus, despite mindless commitment to winning the Cold War for an abstraction called the West. Everyone’s a permanent insider, encoffined in shabby offices and dim apartments, sky-blocking edifices, even a claustrophobic camper."

== Release and reception ==
=== Premiere and theatrical release ===
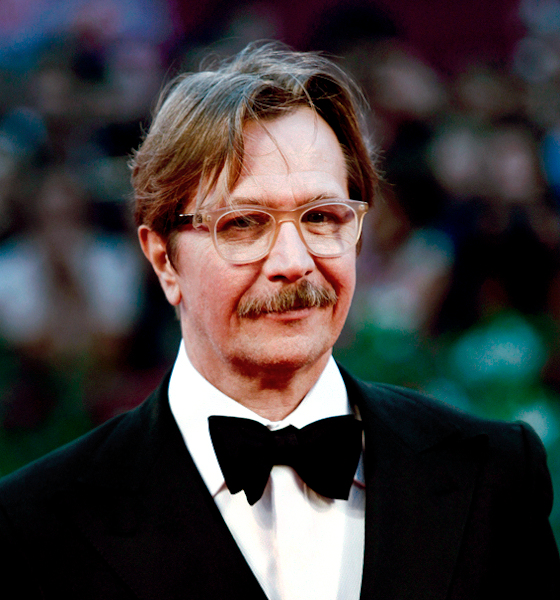
Gary Oldman at the Venice International Film Festival for the premiere

The film premiered in competition at the 68th Venice International Film Festival on 5 September 2011. StudioCanal UK distributed the film in the United Kingdom, where it was released on 16 September 2011. The American rights were acquired by Universal Pictures, owner of Working Title, and they passed the rights to their subsidiary Focus Features. Focus planned to give the film a wide release in the United States on 9 December 2011 but pushed it to January 2012, when it was given an 800 screen release.

The film was released in France on 8 February 2012 under the title La Taupe (meaning "The Mole"). In advance of its general release, it was screened at MI6 to an audience of Cold War veteran spies.

=== Box office ===
The film topped the British box office chart for three consecutive weeks and earned $80,630,608 worldwide.

=== Critical response ===
Tinker Tailor Soldier Spy received critical acclaim. Review aggregator Rotten Tomatoes found that 84% of 229 critics reviewed the film positively. Metacritic calculated an average critic score of 85/100 based on 42 reviews, indicating "universal acclaim".

Jonathan Romney of The Independent wrote, "The script is a brilliant feat of condensation and restructuring: writers Peter Straughan and the late Bridget O'Connor realise the novel is overtly about information and its flow, and reshape its daunting complexity to highlight that". David Gritten of The Daily Telegraph declared the film "a triumph" and gave it a five star rating, as did his colleague, Sukhdev Sandhu. Stateside, Peter Travers of Rolling Stone wrote, "As Alfredson directs the expert script by Peter Straughan and Bridget O'Connor, the film emerges as a tale of loneliness and desperation among men who can never disclose their secret hearts, even to themselves. It's easily one of the year's best films." M. Enois Duarte of High-Def Digest also praised the film as a "brilliant display of drama, mystery and suspense, one which regards its audience with intelligence".

Writing in The Atlantic, le Carré admirer James Parker favourably contrasted Smiley with the James Bond franchise but found this Tinker Tailor adaptation "problematic" compared with the 1979 BBC mini-series. He wrote: "To strip down or minimalize le Carré, however, is to sacrifice the almost Tolkienesque grain and depth of his created world: the decades-long backstory, the lingo, the arcana, the liturgical repetitions of names and functions".

Keith Uhlich of Time Out New York named Tinker Tailor Soldier Spy the fourth-best film of 2011, calling it "a visually stunning adaptation with a stellar cast."

=== Legacy ===
In a 2016 BBC poll of international critics, Turkish critic Ali Arkan named Tinker Tailor Soldier Spy as one of the 10 greatest films of the 21st century. In 2020, New York film critic, Keith Uhlich named it the ninth-best film of the 2010s, while The Guardian's Peter Bradshaw placed the film as the "magnum opus" and "masterpiece" of Le Carré adaptations. Radio Times wrote that the film was "widely regarded as one of the greatest contemporary British films" by 2021. Time critic Stephanie Zacharek named it one of the 50 underappreciated films of the 21st century in 2026, characterising it as "a movie that felt like a blessing for intelligent adult moviegoers when it was released—and in that regard seems almost unthinkable today".

=== Awards and honours ===
List of awards and nominations
Award	Date of ceremony	Category	Recipient(s) and nominee(s)	Result
Academy Awards	26 February 2012	Best Actor	Gary Oldman	Nominated
Academy Awards	26 February 2012	Best Adapted Screenplay	Bridget O'Connor, Peter Straughan	Nominated
Academy Awards	26 February 2012	Best Original Score	Alberto Iglesias	Nominated
Amanda Award	17 August 2012	Best Foreign Film	Tomas Alfredson	Nominated
American Society of Cinematographers	12 February 2012	Best Cinematography in a Feature Film	Hoyte van Hoytema	Nominated
Art Directors Guild	4 February 2012	Period Film	Maria Djurkovic (Production Designer)	Nominated
British Academy Film Awards	12 February 2012	Best Film		Nominated
British Academy Film Awards	12 February 2012	Outstanding British Film		Won
British Academy Film Awards	12 February 2012	Best Actor in a Leading Role	Gary Oldman	Nominated
British Academy Film Awards	12 February 2012	Best Director	Tomas Alfredson	Nominated
British Academy Film Awards	12 February 2012	Best Adapted Screenplay	Bridget O'Connor, Peter Straughan	Won
British Academy Film Awards	12 February 2012	Best Original Music	Alberto Iglesias	Nominated
British Academy Film Awards	12 February 2012	Best Cinematography	Hoyte van Hoytema	Nominated
British Academy Film Awards	12 February 2012	Best Editing	Dino Jonsater	Nominated
British Academy Film Awards	12 February 2012	Best Production Design	Maria Djurkovic, Tatiana MacDonald	Nominated
British Academy Film Awards	12 February 2012	Best Costume Design	Jacqueline Durran	Nominated
British Academy Film Awards	12 February 2012	Best Sound		Nominated
British Academy Film Awards	12 February 2012	Outstanding British Contribution to Cinema	John Hurt	Won
British Film Bloggers Circle Awards	21 February 2012	Best Film		Nominated
British Film Bloggers Circle Awards	21 February 2012	Best British Film		Nominated
British Film Bloggers Circle Awards	21 February 2012	Best Actor	Gary Oldman	Nominated
British Film Bloggers Circle Awards	21 February 2012	Best Director	Tomas Alfredson	Nominated
British Film Bloggers Circle Awards	21 February 2012	Best Adapted Screenplay		Won
British Independent Film Awards	4 December 2011	Best British Independent Film	Tinker Tailor Soldier Spy	Nominated
British Independent Film Awards	4 December 2011	Best Director of a British Independent Film	Tomas Alfredson	Nominated
British Independent Film Awards	4 December 2011	Best Performance by an Actor in a British Independent Film	Gary Oldman	Nominated
British Independent Film Awards	4 December 2011	Best Technical Achievement	Maria Djurkovic (Production Design)	Won
British Independent Film Awards	4 December 2011	Best Supporting Actress	Kathy Burke	Nominated
British Independent Film Awards	4 December 2011	Best Supporting Actor	Tom Hardy	Nominated
British Independent Film Awards	4 December 2011	Best Supporting Actor	Benedict Cumberbatch	Nominated
British Film Institute	4 December 2011	Top Ten Films		Won
British Film Institute	4 December 2011	Best Film		10th Place
Burgundy Film Critics Awards	24 February 2013	Best Foreign Film	Tomas Alfredson	Won
Ciak d'oro	6 June 2012	Best Foreign Film	Tomas Alfredson	Runner-up
Chicago Film Critics Association	19 December 2011	Best Actor	Gary Oldman	Nominated
Chicago Film Critics Association	19 December 2011	Best Adapted Screenplay	Bridget O'Connor, Peter Straughan	Nominated
Crime Thriller Awards	18 September 2012	Best Film		Won
Conch Awards	19 September 2012	Best Film Soundtrack	Stephen Griffiths	Won
Conch Awards	19 September 2012	Best Film Mix Facility	Goldcrest Post Production	Nominated
Conch Awards	19 September 2012	Best Sound Design & Editorial Team	Andy Shelley and Stephen Griffiths	Nominated
Denver Film Critics Society	11 January 2012	Best Cast		Nominated
Denver Film Critics Society	11 January 2012	Best Original Score	Alberto Iglesias	Nominated
Dublin Film Critics Circle Awards	23 December 2011	Top Ten Films		Won
Dublin Film Critics Circle Awards	23 December 2011	Best Film		4th Place
Dublin Film Critics Circle Awards	23 December 2011	Top Ten Directors	Tomas Alfredson	Won
Dublin Film Critics Circle Awards	23 December 2011	Best Director	Tomas Alfredson	4th Place
Dublin Film Critics Circle Awards	23 December 2011	Top Ten Actors	Gary Oldman	Won
Dublin Film Critics Circle Awards	23 December 2011	Best Actor	Gary Oldman	3rd Place
Empire Awards	25 March 2012	Best Film		Nominated
Empire Awards	25 March 2012	Best British Film		Won
Empire Awards	25 March 2012	Best Actor	Gary Oldman	Won
Empire Awards	25 March 2012	Best Director	Tomas Alfredson	Nominated
Empire Awards	25 March 2012	Best Thriller		Won
European Film Awards	1 December 2012	Best Actor	Gary Oldman	Nominated
European Film Awards	1 December 2012	Best Production Design	Maria Djurkovic	Won
European Film Awards	1 December 2012	Best Cinematography	Hoyte van Hoytema	Nominated
European Film Awards	1 December 2012	Best Original Score	Alberto Iglesias	Won
European Film Awards	1 December 2012	People's Choice Award – Best European Film	Tomas Alfredson	Won
Evening Standard British Film Awards	7 February 2012	Best Film		Nominated
Evening Standard British Film Awards	7 February 2012	Best Actor	Gary Oldman	Nominated
Evening Standard British Film Awards	7 February 2012	Best Technical Achievement	Maria Djurkovic	Nominated
Evening Standard British Film Awards	7 February 2012	Alexander Walker Special Award	John Hurt	Won
Golden Eagle Award	25 January 2013	Best Foreign Language Film	Tinker Tailor Soldier Spy	Nominated
Golden Trailer Awards	31 May 2012	Best Drama Trailer		Nominated
Golden Trailer Awards	31 May 2012	Best Thriller Trailer		Nominated
Golden Trailer Awards	31 May 2012	Best Independent Poster		Won
Golden Trailer Awards	31 May 2012	Best Drama Poster		Nominated
Georgia Film Critics Association	16 January 2012	Best Film		Nominated
Georgia Film Critics Association	16 January 2012	Best Director	Tomas Alfredson	Nominated
Georgia Film Critics Association	16 January 2012	Best Actor in a Leading Role	Gary Oldman	Nominated
Georgia Film Critics Association	16 January 2012	Best Supporting Actor	Tom Hardy	Nominated
Georgia Film Critics Association	16 January 2012	Best Ensemble Cast		Won
Georgia Film Critics Association	16 January 2012	Best Adapted Screenplay	Bridget O'Connor, Peter Straughan	Nominated
Georgia Film Critics Association	16 January 2012	Best Cinematography	Hoyte van Hoytema	Nominated
Georgia Film Critics Association	16 January 2012	Best Production Design	Maria Djurkovic	Nominated
Gotham Independent Film Awards	18 November 2011	Gotham Tribute Award	Gary Oldman	Won
Hollywood Film Festival	24 October 2011	Best Composer	Alberto Iglesias	Won
International Cinephile Society	22 February 2012	Best Cast		Runner-up
International Cinephile Society	22 February 2012	Best Adapted Screenplay	Bridget O'Connor, Peter Straughan	Won
International Cinephile Society	22 February 2012	Best Production Design	Maria Djurkovic	Runner-up
International Cinephile Society	22 February 2012	Best Original Score	Alberto Iglesias	Runner-up
International Federation of Film Critics Award	10 September 2012	Grand Prix for the best film	Tomas Alfredson	9th Place
Irish Film and Television Awards	11 February 2012	Best International Film		Won
Irish Film and Television Awards	11 February 2012	Actor in a Lead Role in a Feature Film	Ciarán Hinds	Nominated
Irish Film and Television Awards	11 February 2012	International Actor	Gary Oldman	Nominated
Italian Online Film Actors & Dubbers Award	1 September 2012	Best Foreign Actor	Gary Oldman	Won
Italian Online Film Actors & Dubbers Award	1 September 2012	Best Foreign Supporting Actor	Tom Hardy	Nominated
Italian Online Film Actors & Dubbers Award	1 September 2012	Best Foreign Cast		Won
Italian Online Film Actors & Dubbers Award	1 September 2012	Best Male Dubber	Stefano De Sando	Won
Italian Online Film Actors & Dubbers Award	1 September 2012	Public Choice Award for Best Performance	Gary Oldman	Won
Italy Screenplay Prize	13 July 2012	Best Film		Won
Italy Screenplay Prize	13 July 2012	Top Ten Films		Won
Italy Screenplay Prize	13 July 2012	Best Adapted Screenplay – International	Bridget O'Connor, Peter Straughan	Won
Italy Screenplay Prize	13 July 2012	Special Award for Best Director	Tomas Alfredson	Won
Italy Screenplay Prize	13 July 2012	Special Award for Best Performance	Gary Oldman	Won
Las Vegas Film Critics Society	13 December 2011	Best Actor	Gary Oldman	Nominated
Las Vegas Film Critics Society	13 December 2011	Best Screenplay	Bridget O'Connor, Peter Straughan	Nominated
Las Vegas Film Critics Society	13 December 2011	Best Art Direction	Maria Djurkovic	Nominated
Las Vegas Film Critics Society	13 December 2011	Best Cinematography		Nominated
Las Vegas Film Critics Society	13 December 2011	Best Editing	Dino Jonsater	Nominated
London Film Critics Circle Award	19 January 2012	Top Ten Film		Won
London Film Critics Circle Award	19 January 2012	Best Film		4th Place
London Film Critics Circle Award	19 January 2012	Best British Film		Nominated
London Film Critics Circle Award	19 January 2012	Best Actor	Gary Oldman	Nominated
London Film Critics Circle Award	19 January 2012	Best British Actor	Gary Oldman	Nominated
London Film Critics Circle Award	19 January 2012	Best Screenplay	Bridget O'Connor, Peter Straughan	Nominated
London Film Critics Circle Award	19 January 2012	Technical Achievement	Maria Djurkovic	Won
Los Angeles Film Critics Association	11 December 2011	Best Art Direction	Maria Djurkovic	Runner-up
Metacritic Awards	5 January 2012	Best Reviewed Drama		3rd Place
Metacritic Awards	5 January 2012	Best Reviewed Thriller		Won
Movie Farm Awards	12 February 2012	Best Actor	Gary Oldman	Won
Music & Sound Awards		Best Original Composition in a Film	Alberto Iglesias	Won
Online Film Critics Society Awards	2 January 2012	Best Actor	Gary Oldman	Nominated
Online Film Critics Society Awards	2 January 2012	Best Adapted Screenplay		Won
Online Film Critics Society Awards	2 January 2012	Best Editing	Dino Jonsater	Nominated
Online Film & Television Association	5 February 2012	Best Actor	Gary Oldman	Nominated
Online Film & Television Association	5 February 2012	Best Adapted Screenplay		Won
Online Film & Television Association	5 February 2012	Best Production Design	Maria Djurkovic	Nominated
Online Film & Television Association	5 February 2012	Best Cast		Won
Online Film & Television Association	5 February 2012	Best Casting	Jina Jay	Won
Palm Springs International Film Festival	15 January 2012	Best International Star	Gary Oldman	Won
Phoenix Film Critics Society	27 December 2011	Best Actor	Gary Oldman	Nominated
Premio Cinema Ludus	19 November 2012	Gran Prix for Best Film	Tomas Alfredson	Won
Premio Cinema Ludus	19 November 2012	Prix for Best Actor	Gary Oldman	Won
Premio Cinema Ludus	19 November 2012	Best European Film		Won
Premio Cinema Ludus	19 November 2012	Best European Director	Tomas Alfredson	Won
Premio Cinema Ludus	19 November 2012	Best European Actor	Gary Oldman	Won
Premio Cinema Ludus	19 November 2012	Best European Screenplay	Bridget O'Connor, Peter Straughan	Won
Premio Cinema Ludus	19 November 2012	Best European Technical Achievement	Maria Djurkovic	Won
Premio Cinema Ludus	19 November 2012	Best Producer	Tim Bevan, Eric Fellner	Won
Richard Attenborough Regional Film Awards	2 February 2012	Best British Film of the year		Won
Richard Attenborough Regional Film Awards	2 February 2012	Best Actor of the year	Gary Oldman	Nominated
Richard Attenborough Regional Film Awards	2 February 2012	Best British Actor of the year	Gary Oldman	Won
Richard Attenborough Regional Film Awards	2 February 2012	Best Screenplay	Bridget O'Connor, Peter Straughan	Won
San Francisco Film Critics Circle	25 March 2012	Best Actor	Gary Oldman	Won
San Francisco Film Critics Circle	25 March 2012	Best Adapted Screenplay	Bridget O'Connor, Peter Straughan	Won
Satellite Award	18 December 2011	Best Film – Motion Picture		Nominated
Satellite Award	18 December 2011	Best Director	Tomas Alfredson	Nominated
Satellite Award	18 December 2011	Best Actor – Motion Picture	Gary Oldman	Nominated
Spanish Film Music Critics Awards	29 June 2012	Best Spanish Composer	Alberto Iglesias	Won
Stockholm Film Festival	20 November 2011	FIPRESCI Award		Won
Sydney Film Critics	21 December 2011	Top Twenty Unreleased Films		Won
Sydney Film Critics	21 December 2011	Best Unreleased Film		4th Place
Total Film Hotlist	3 August 2012	Hottest Film		Nominated
Total Film Hotlist	3 August 2012	Hottest Actor	Benedict Cumberbatch	Nominated
Total Film Hotlist	3 August 2012	Hottest Actor	Tom Hardy	Nominated
Venice Film Festival	10 September 2011	Golden Lion		Nominated
Virgin Media Movie Awards	1 March 2012	Best Film		Nominated
Washington D.C. Area Film Critics Association	5 December 2011	Best Adapted Screenplay	Bridget O'Connor, Peter Straughan	Nominated
YouMovie Awards	30 June 2012	Best Film		Won
YouMovie Awards	30 June 2012	Best Drama Film		Won
YouMovie Awards	30 June 2012	Best Thriller		Won
YouMovie Awards	30 June 2012	Best Actor in a Leading Role	Gary Oldman	Won
YouMovie Awards	30 June 2012	Best Supporting Actor	Benedict Cumberbatch	Nominated
YouMovie Awards	30 June 2012	Best Supporting Actor	Colin Firth	Nominated
YouMovie Awards	30 June 2012	Best Cast		Won
YouMovie Awards	30 June 2012	Best Villain	Colin Firth	Nominated
YouMovie Awards	30 June 2012	Best Director	Tomas Alfredson	Won
YouMovie Awards	30 June 2012	Best Trailer		Won
YouMovie Awards	30 June 2012	Best Cinematography	Hoyte Van Hoytema	Nominated
YouMovie Awards	30 June 2012	Best Art Direction	Maria Djurkovic	Nominated
YouMovie Awards	30 June 2012	Best Screenplay	Bridget O'Connor, Peter Straughan	Won
YouMovie Awards	30 June 2012	Best Costume Design	Jaqueline Durran	Nominated
World Soundtrack Academy	20 October 2012	Best Score of the Year	Alberto Iglesias	Won
World Soundtrack Academy	20 October 2012	Best Composer of the Year	Alberto Iglesias	Won

== Possible sequel ==
Just over a year after the film's release, producer Eric Fellner stated that fellow producer Tim Bevan was working with writer Straughan and director Alfredson on developing a sequel to Tinker Tailor Soldier Spy. In 2014 Oldman said that talk of a sequel, an adaptation of Smiley's People, had since disappeared, while also stressing that he would still like to see the film produced. In July 2016, Oldman revealed that a sequel was in its early stages, stating, "There is a script, but I don't know when we will shoot." It was reported at the time that a script based on Smiley's People had been "greenlit" by Working Title Films.

In December 2021, Alfredson said that a film sequel to the 2011 film was unlikely as the rights had reverted to le Carré's estate, who were planning to reboot Smiley on television. Alfredson expressed an interest in directing Oldman in a future TV miniseries adaptation of Smiley's People but he thought that the moment had likely passed. Earlier that year, it had been announced that Alfredson and Straughan were working with Studiocanal to develop a television adaptation of Dave Hutchinson spy novels. In an interview with the Radio Times in September 2024, producer Douglas Urbanski said that, "We loved Tinker and we started to do prep for Gary to do Smiley’s People, and suddenly there was an unexpected rights issue. We've reached out, including again recently, to le Carré’s sons and—the damnedest thing—they have no interest in Gary playing Smiley again. I don’t know why." In March 2025, Deadline announced that Legacy of Spies, a new TV adaptation of le Carré novels co-written by his son Stephen Cornwell, had begun production by The Ink Factory, the production company founded by Stephen and another of le Carré's sons, Simon; this effectively ended hope of a sequel to the film.
