= Tinker Tailor Soldier Spy =

1974 spy novel by John le Carré

- First UK edition
- Author: John le Carré
- Cover artist: Jerry Harpur
- Language: English
- Series: The Quest for Karla
- Genre: Spy fiction
- Publisher: Hodder & Stoughton (UK)
- Publication date: June 1974
- Publication place: United Kingdom
- Media type: Print (hardback & paperback)
- Pages: 355
- ISBN: 0-394-49219-6
- OCLC: 867935
- Dewey Decimal: 823/.914 L456
- LC Class: PZ4.L4526 L43 1974
- Preceded by: The Naïve and Sentimental Lover
- Followed by: The Honourable Schoolboy

Tinker Tailor Soldier Spy is a 1974 spy novel by the author and former secret intelligence officer John le Carré. It follows the endeavours of the taciturn, ageing spymaster George Smiley to uncover a Soviet mole in the British Secret Intelligence Service. The novel has received critical acclaim for its complex social commentary—and, at the time, relevance, following the defection of Kim Philby. It was followed by The Honourable Schoolboy in 1977 and Smiley's People in 1979. The three novels together make up the "Karla Trilogy", named after Smiley's long-time nemesis Karla, the head of Soviet foreign intelligence and the trilogy's overarching antagonist.

The novel has been adapted into both a television series and a film, and remains a staple of the spy fiction genre. In 2022, the novel was included on the "Big Jubilee Read" list of 70 books by Commonwealth authors, selected to celebrate the Platinum Jubilee of Elizabeth II.

== Plot ==
=== Background ===
As the tension of the Cold War is peaking in 1973, George Smiley, former senior official in Britain's Secret Intelligence Service (known as "the Circus" because its London office is at Cambridge Circus), is living unhappily in forced retirement, following the failure of an operation codenamed Testify in Czechoslovakia, which ended in the capture and torture of agent Jim Prideaux. Control, chief of the Circus, had suspected that one of the five senior intelligence officers at the Circus was a Soviet mole, and had assigned them code names for Prideaux to relay back to the Circus, derived from the English children's rhyme "Tinker, Tailor":

Tinker, tailor,
soldier, sailor,
rich man, poor man,
beggarman, thief.

The failure resulted in the dismissal of Control, Smiley, and allies such as Connie Sachs and Jerry Westerby, and their replacement by a new guard consisting of Percy Alleline, Toby Esterhase, Bill Haydon, and Roy Bland. Control has since died, and Smiley's former protégé, Peter Guillam, has been demoted to the "scalphunters".

Guillam unexpectedly approaches Smiley and takes him to the house of Under-Secretary Oliver Lacon, the civil servant who oversees the Circus. There, they meet Ricki Tarr, an agent recently declared persona non grata due to suspicion that he has defected. Tarr defends himself by explaining that he was informed of a Soviet mole at the highest level of the Circus – codenamed Gerald – by Irina, the wife of a trade delegate, while in Hong Kong. Irina claimed that the mole, Gerald, reports to a Soviet official stationed at the embassy in London called Polyakov. Shortly after Tarr relayed this to the Circus, Irina was forcibly returned to the Soviet Union, leading Tarr to suspect that the mole was real, and now knew his identity. Tarr went into hiding, resurfacing to contact Guillam.

Lacon reasons that neither Smiley nor Guillam can be the mole, due to their respective dismissal and demotion, and so requests that Smiley investigate the presence of the mole in total secrecy to avoid another PR scandal for both the Government and the Circus. Smiley cautiously agrees, and forms a team consisting of himself, Guillam, Tarr, and retired Scotland Yard Inspector Mendel. Smiley is also given access to Circus documents, and begins by examining Alleline's restructuring, discovering the ousting of Jerry Westerby and Connie Sachs, as well as slush fund payments to Jim Prideaux.

=== Smiley begins the hunt ===
Smiley visits Sachs, discovering that she confronted Alleline about her discovery that Polyakov was actually a Soviet Colonel called Gregor Viktorov, but he ordered her to drop the subject. She also mentions rumours of a secret Soviet facility for training moles, and makes allusions to Prideaux and Bill Haydon's relationship being more than just platonic friendship.

Smiley examines Operation Witchcraft, an operation in which Soviet intelligence was obtained through a key source known as "Merlin", which was treated with suspicion by both Smiley and Control. Alleline obtained ministerial support to circumvent Control's authority, and his post-Testify promotion supporters Haydon, Esterhase, and Bland have sponsored it. Smiley also learns that this "Magic Circle" has obtained a safe house somewhere in London where they obtain information from a Merlin emissary posted in London under a diplomatic cover, who – Smiley concludes – is Polyakov himself.

Smiley suspects that the Circus does not realise the flow of information is going the other way, with the mole "Gerald" passing important British secrets ("gold dust") in return for low-grade Soviet material ("chicken feed"), which would make "Witchcraft" simply a cover for the mole.

=== Karla ===
Smiley also discovers that the log from the night Tarr reported in from Hong Kong has been removed, and Guillam starts to suffer from paranoia as a result of their operation. Smiley tells Guillam that he suspects a Soviet intelligence officer named Karla is linked in some way to the operation, and reveals what he knows about him. Karla is believed to have followed his father into espionage, getting his start during the Spanish Civil War, posing as a White Russian émigré in the forces of General Francisco Franco, recruiting foreign, mainly German, operatives. After this, the Circus lost track of Karla, but he resurfaced during Operation Barbarossa, directing partisan operations behind German lines. Smiley explains his belief that somewhere in the gap between these two conflicts, Karla travelled to England and recruited Gerald.

Smiley points out that Karla is fiercely loyal to both the Soviet Union and communism, highlighting Karla's current rank despite his internment in a gulag by the Stalinist regime. He reveals that Karla turned down an offer from Smiley in India to defect, even though his return to the Soviet Union in 1955 was to face a likely execution, after Smiley worked with American authorities to disrupt Karla's efforts to establish a clandestine radio transmitter for agents in San Francisco. During his attempt to obtain Karla's defection, Smiley plied him with cigarettes and promises that they could get Karla's family out to the West safely. Smiley suspects that this only revealed his own weakness, his love for his unfaithful wife, Ann. Smiley offered Karla his lighter, a present from Ann, to light a cigarette, but Karla rose and left with it.

=== Merlin and Testify ===
Smiley suspects a link between Merlin and the botched Operation Testify. Sam Collins, who was the duty officer that night, tells Smiley that Control ordered him to relay the report of the Czech operation only to him, but that when he did so, Control froze up, and that Bill Haydon's sudden arrival was the only reason the hierarchy did not fall apart that night. Smiley then visits Max, a Czech operative who served as a legman for Prideaux on the operation, who tells Smiley that Prideaux gave him instructions to leave Czechoslovakia any way he could if Prideaux did not surface at the rendezvous at the appointed time. Smiley next visits Jerry Westerby, who tells Smiley about the trip to Prague when a young army conscript insisted that the Soviets were in the woods waiting for Prideaux a full day before he was ambushed.

Finally, Smiley tracks down Prideaux, who tells him Control believed there was a mole in the Circus and had whittled it down to five men, Alleline (Tinker), Haydon (Tailor), Bland (Soldier), Esterhase (Poorman), and Smiley himself (Beggarman). Prideaux's orders were to obtain the identity from a defector in Czech intelligence who knew. He tells Smiley he almost did not make the rendezvous with Max because he noticed he was being tailed, and that when he arrived to meet the defector, he was ambushed, taking two bullets to his right shoulder. During his captivity, both Polyakov and Karla interrogated him, focusing solely on the extent and status of Control's investigation. Prideaux suggests that the Czech defector was a plant, contrived by Karla to engineer Control's downfall through Testify's failure, all conceived to protect the mole.

=== Catching the mole ===
Smiley confronts Toby Esterhase, stating that he is aware that Esterhase has been posing as a Soviet mole, with Polyakov as his handler, to provide cover for Merlin's emissary, Polyakov. Smiley compels Esterhase into revealing the location of the safe house by making him realise that not only is there a real Soviet mole embedded in the SIS, but also that Polyakov has not been "turned" to work in British interest, pretending to run the "mole" Esterhase, and in fact remains Karla's agent. Tarr is sent to Paris, where he passes a coded message to Alleline about "information crucial to the well-being of the Service". This triggers an emergency meeting between Gerald and Polyakov at the safe house, where Smiley and Guillam are lying in wait.

Haydon is revealed to be the mole, and his interrogation reveals that he had been recruited several decades ago by Karla and became a full-fledged Soviet spy partly for political reasons, partly in frustration at Britain's rapidly declining influence on the world stage, particularly on account of the failings at Suez. He is expected to be exchanged with the Soviet Union for several of the agents he betrayed, but is killed shortly before he is due to leave England. Although the identity of his killer is not explicitly revealed, it is strongly implied to be Prideaux, due to the method of execution (a quick snap of the neck) echoing the way he euthanises an injured owl earlier in the book, Prideaux's implied threat to execute a driver in Czechoslovakia in the same way that Haydon is killed, and a sense Smiley has of someone with Prideaux's background observing some of his later interrogations. Smiley is appointed temporary head of the Circus to deal with the fallout, and is still head at the start of the second book of The Karla Trilogy, The Honourable Schoolboy.

== Background ==
Tinker Tailor Soldier Spy is the fifth of le Carré's spy novels to feature the character of George Smiley (the first four being: Call for the Dead, A Murder of Quality, The Spy Who Came in from the Cold, and The Looking Glass War) and the fictionalised intelligence agency of "the Circus." Two of the characters, Peter Guillam and Inspector Mendel, first appeared in Call for the Dead, while Control appeared in The Spy Who Came in from the Cold. With Tinker Tailor Soldier Spy, le Carré returned to the world of spy fiction after his non-espionage novel, The Naïve and Sentimental Lover, was panned by critics.

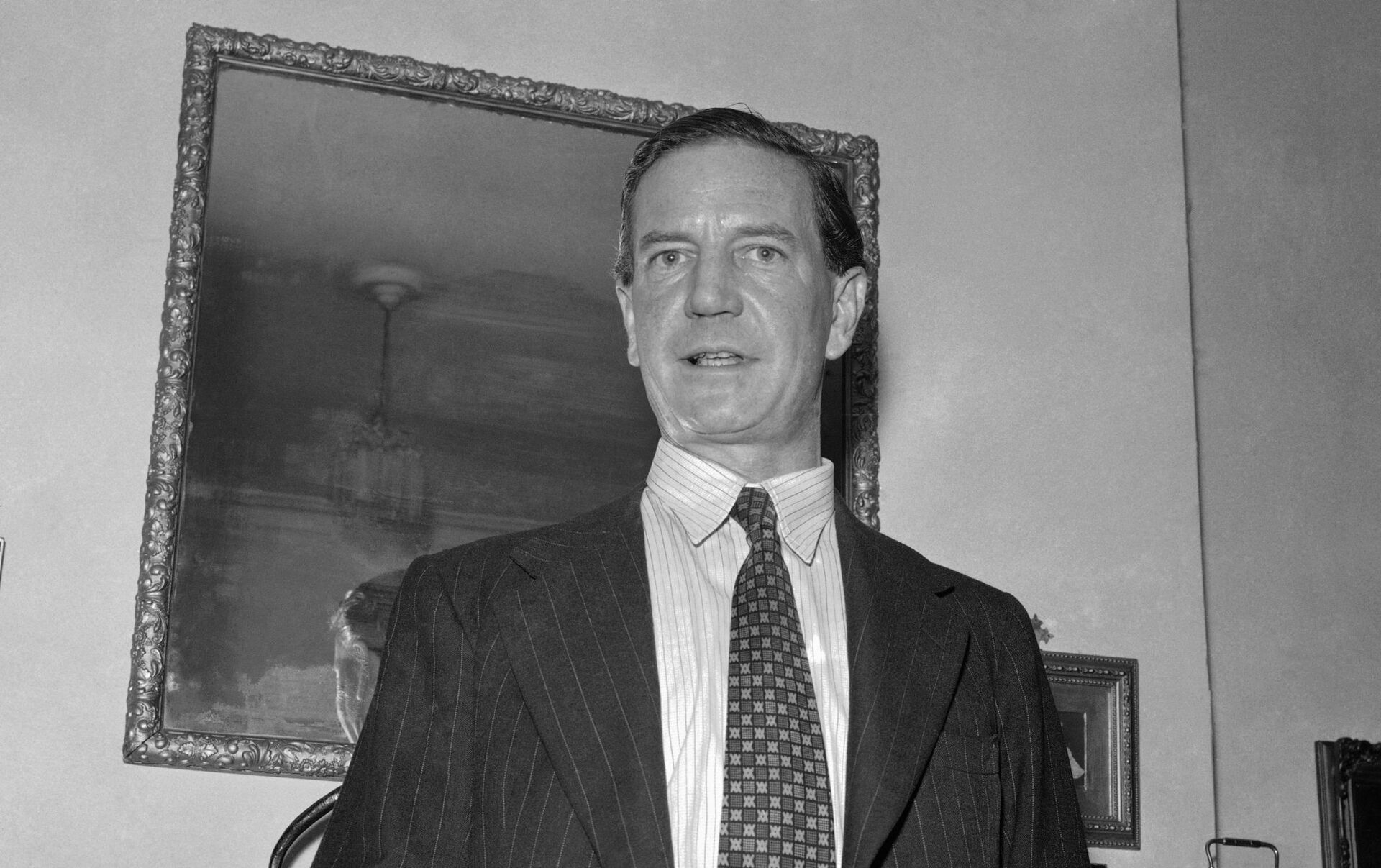
Le Carré drew on the defection of Kim Philby, a high-ranking MI6 operative revealed to be a Soviet spy in 1963.

When Tinker Tailor Soldier Spy was published in 1974, revelations exposing the presence of Soviet double agents in Britain were still fresh in public memory. Guy Burgess, Donald Maclean, and Kim Philby, later known as members of the Cambridge Five, had been exposed as KGB spies. The five had risen to very senior positions in the British diplomatic service.

John le Carré is the nom-de-plume of David Cornwell, who worked as an intelligence officer for MI5 and MI6 (SIS) in the 1950s and early 1960s. Senior SIS officer Kim Philby's defection to the Soviet Union in 1963, and the consequent compromising of British agents, was a factor in the 1964 termination of Cornwell's intelligence career. Le Carré also drew from the paranoid atmosphere created by CIA counterintelligence chief James Jesus Angleton, who after Philby's defection became convinced that other moles were operating at the highest levels of Western intelligence agencies.

The title alludes to the nursery rhyme and counting game Tinker, Tailor.

After le Carré donated his papers to the Bodleian Library, its director, Richard Ovenden, wrote that the drafts of Tinker Tailor Soldier Spy "show a deep process of collaboration with his wife, Jane."

== Themes ==
"It's scarce wonder that Smiley has become almost as legendary a figure as [Kim] Philby, for Tinker, Tailor with all its outward verisimilitude, constructs a potent and appealing myth for the class-ridden and post-imperial angst of Britain in the 1970s."

— David A. T. Stafford

Tinker Tailor Soldier Spy is set against a theme of decline in British influence on the world stage after the Second World War, with the Soviet Union and the United States emerging as the dominant superpowers during the Cold War. Mark Fisher said the notion of "postcolonial melancholia" hangs over the novel, arguing that both the protagonists and antagonists are motivated by what they see as Britain's "irreversible decline." These themes are particularly found in the character of Bill Haydon, who is modelled on the upper-class double agent Kim Philby. After his unmasking and capture, Haydon voices both a latent hostility towards the United States and a mourning of Britain's lack of "relevance or moral viability in world affairs." The novel is emblematic of a British "rottenness," according to critic David Monaghan, and le Carré locates it with a failure of the British ruling class itself, which has become directionless and self-seeking.

Central to the novel is the theme of betrayal. Melvyn Bragg wrote that le Carré sought to illustrate that "the public or institutional default is always more excusable than the personal betrayal of faith." Haydon's betrayal of the Circus to Karla comes as a reaction to a postwar world that "[deprived] him of the Empire he was trained to rule." Monaghan notes that le Carré (in Smiley's People) refers to Haydon as a "born deceiver," who betrays his colleague (Smiley), his lover (Ann and/or Prideaux) and his country. Nevertheless, Haydon's exact motivations are left vague – unlike Philby, who espoused a deep ideological commitment to communism."

Historian David A. T. Stafford considered Haydon's eventual capture to be a mythologised reimagining of the Philby affair. He noted that, "far from receiving his just desserts," the real-life mole ended up alive and well in Moscow, thanks to the incompetence of his superiors and the willful ignorance of his colleagues. "That Philby was protected by a conspiracy of class is true enough, but that he was unmasked by a Smiley is not... Tinker Tailor is a fantasy; George Smiley a myth." In this sense, Stafford considers Smiley and Haydon to exist as classic foils to each other:

Like Philby, [Haydon] betrays his colleagues, his friends, his country, and his class [...] Smiley, on the contrary, lives by loyalty – to his faithless wife, Ann, his subordinates, his colleagues, and his country. In the end, integrity triumphs over corruption.

Tom Maddox wrote that Smiley's conflict with the Circus, past and present, represents the idealistic virtues of the Second World War that are "at odds" with the inhumanity, sophistry, and careerism of the spying profession. "The secret service seeks to dispense with that humanity, the consensus on high being that humane virtues have outlasted whatever limited usefulness they might have had. So Smiley comes and goes, comes and goes." Fisher noted Smiley's characterisation as an outsider to the affairs the Circus, representing an archetypical Englishness that is both "stolid" and "voyeuristic". Fisher likens Smiley in the novel to both King Arthur – a "perpetually cuckolded" figure "returning to save his ailing kingdom" – as well as T. S. Eliot's figure of J. Alfred Prufrock, who is at once self-conscious and "pathologically self-blinding" to his weaknesses.

== Characters ==
- George Smiley – Formerly a senior officer in the Circus, who was pushed out at the same time as Control, his mentor. Smiley's timid nature and unassuming appearance belies his keen understanding of spycraft. He is called upon to investigate the presence of a Soviet mole in the Circus. Various inspirations for Smiley have been suggested, including le Carré's superior in MI5, John Bingham, and MI6 chief Maurice Oldfield (who took the position in 1973, a year before the book was published).
- Peter Guillam – Head of the scalphunters, the section of the Circus used in operations that require physical action and/or violence. Previously the head of Satellites Four, in charge of East German operations, he was "exiled" to the scalphunters outstation in Brixton after Control was dismissed. Son of a French businessman and an Englishwoman, he is a longtime associate of Smiley's.
- Jim Prideaux – Former field agent and head of the scalphunters, Prideaux was shot in Czechoslovakia under the codename "Jim Ellis" during Operation Testify and kept in Soviet captivity. Now teaches at a boys' prep school. He was first identified as a prospective recruit by fellow student Bill Haydon at Oxford.
- Control – Longtime head of the Circus, now dead. Once a Cambridge don, he becomes convinced that one of his subordinates is a Soviet agent, and spends the last years of his tenure trying to uncover them.
- Sir Percy Alleline – Chief of the Circus following Control's ousting. Alleline spent his early career in South America, northern Africa and India. He is vain and overambitious, and is despised by Control. Alleline is knighted in the course of the book in recognition of the quality of the intelligence provided by the source codenamed Merlin.
- Bill Haydon – Commander of London Station, he has worked with the Circus since the war. A polymath, he was recruited at Oxford where he was a close companion of Prideaux. A distant cousin of Ann Smiley, he has an affair with her, and this knowledge subsequently becomes widely known. One of the four who ran the double agent codenamed Merlin.
- Roy Bland – Second in command of London Station to Bill Haydon. Recruited by Smiley at Oxford, he was the top specialist in Soviet satellite states and spent several years undercover as a left-wing academic in the Balkans before being instated in the Circus.
- Toby Esterhase – He is the head of the Acton lamplighters, the section of the Circus responsible for surveillance and wiretapping. Hungarian by birth, Esterhase is an anglophile with pretensions of being a British gentleman. He was recruited by Smiley as "a starving student in Vienna."
- Oliver Lacon – A permanent secretary in the Cabinet Office. Civilian overseer of the Circus. A former Cambridge rowing blue; his father "a dignitary of the Scottish church" and his mother "something noble."
- Mendel – Retired former inspector in the Special Branch, he assists Smiley during his investigation. Frequently a go-between for Smiley and other members helping him investigate.
- Connie Sachs – Former Russia analyst for the Circus, she is forced to retire, and now runs a rooming house in Oxford. Alcoholic, but with an excellent memory. She is said to have been modelled upon Milicent Bagot.
- Ricki Tarr – A field agent and presumed defector who supplies information that indicates there is a Soviet mole in the Circus. He was trained by Smiley. Worked for Guillam as one of the scalphunters before going AWOL in Hong Kong.
- Sam Collins – a Circus officer deputed by Control to be duty officer on the night Operation Testify was to take place. Later sacked by Percy Alleline for drinking on duty, and became a front of house manager for a London casino.
- Jerry Westerby – a journalist occasionally used by the Circus as a postman. He was in Czechoslovakia at the time of Operation Testify and reported that the Russians were waiting for Jim Prideaux a day in advance. Toby Esterhase ridiculed the information and accused Westerby of being a habitual drunkard.
- Miles Sercombe – The government minister to whom Lacon and the Circus are responsible. A distant cousin of Smiley's wife, he plays a peripheral role in Smiley's investigation. Not highly regarded.

== Jargon ==
Tinker Tailor Soldier Spy employs spy jargon that is presented as the authentic insider-speak of British Intelligence. Le Carré noted that, with the exception of a few terms like mole and legend, this jargon was his own invention. In some cases, terms used in the novel have subsequently entered espionage parlance. For example, the terms mole, implying a long-term spy, and honey trap, implying a ploy in which an attractive person lures another into revealing information, were first introduced in this novel, and have only subsequently entered general usage.

Term	Definition
Agent	An espionage agent or spy; a citizen who is recruited by a foreign government to spy on his own country. This term should not be confused with a member of an intelligence service who recruits spies; they are referred to as intelligence officers or more particularly case officers.
Babysitters	Bodyguards.
Burn	Blackmail. (Note: 'Burn' is also in current use, but is now used to describe disavowal)
Circus	The novel's name for SIS (Secret Intelligence Service), MI6, which collects foreign intelligence. "Circus" refers to the (fictional) location of its headquarters in Cambridge Circus, London.
Coat-trailing	An officer of one side acting as if he is a likely defector – drinking, complaining about his job – in the hope of attracting a recruitment offer from an enemy intelligence officer, with the object of becoming a double agent.
The Competition	MI5, the Security Service, the UK's internal counter-espionage and counter-terrorism service, which the Circus also calls "The Security Mob".
The Cousins	The US intelligence agencies in general and the CIA in particular.
Cut-out	An intermediary – a person who acts as a go-between for two parties (typically a handler and an agent) who should never meet directly or know each other's identities.
Ferrets	Technicians who find and remove hidden microphones, cameras, etc.
Handwriting	An agent's particular style of espionage.
Honey trap	A sexual blackmailing operation.
Hood	An agent involved in criminality.
Housekeepers	The internal auditors and financial disciplinarians of the Circus.
Inquisitors	Interrogators who debrief Circus intelligence officers and defectors.
Janitors	The Circus headquarters operations staff, including those who watch doors and verify that people entering secure areas are authorised to do so.
Lamplighters	A section which provides surveillance and couriers.
Legend	A false identity
Mailfist job	An assassination operation. Mailfist might be the code word for such work or the compartmented information concerning the program that performs it.
Mole	An agent recruited long before he has access to secret material, who subsequently works his way into the target government organisation. In his foreword to the 1991 edition, Le Carré discloses that he may have been under the impression "mole" was "current KGB jargon" during his brief stint as an intelligence officer but that he can no longer say for certain; it is possible he actually invented the term himself. Francis Bacon used the word "mole" in the sense of "spy" in his 1622 Historie of the Reigne of King Henry the Seventh, but Le Carré was not aware of Bacon's work while writing the book – the passage was pointed out to him later by a reader.
Mothers	Secretaries and trusted typists serving the senior officers of the Circus.
Neighbours	The Soviet intelligence services, in particular the KGB and Karla's fictional "Thirteenth Directorate".
The Nursery	Nickname for the fictional agent-training school and interrogation centre at Sarratt.
Nuts and Bolts	The engineering department who develop and manufacture espionage devices.
Pavement artists	Members of surveillance teams who inconspicuously follow people in public.
Persil	The cleanest security category available, used of questionable foreigners, "Clean as fabric washed in Persil".
Reptile fund	A slush fund, to provide payment for covert operations. (Attributed to Otto von Bismarck)
Scalphunters	Agents who handle assassination, blackmail, burglary, kidnapping; the section was sidelined after Control's dismissal.
Sweat	Interrogate
Wranglers	Radio signal analysts and cryptographers; it derives from the term wrangler used of Cambridge University maths students.

The television adaptation of Tinker Tailor Soldier Spy also uses the term "burrower" for a researcher recruited from a university, a term taken from the novel's immediate sequel The Honourable Schoolboy.

=== Moscow Centre ===
Moscow Centre is a nickname used by John le Carré for the Moscow central headquarters of the KGB, especially those departments concerned with foreign espionage and counterintelligence. It arises from use by Soviet officers themselves (Russian: Московский центр, romanized: Moskovskiy tsentr), and Le Carré likely just used the nickname to gain greater credibility for his books.

The part of Moscow Centre most often referred to in Le Carré's novels is the fictional Thirteenth Directorate headed by Karla, the code name for a case officer who has risen and fallen from political favour several times and was at one point "blown" by the British in the 1950s. Karla and George Smiley meet while Karla is in prison in Delhi, with Smiley trying to persuade Karla to defect during an interrogation in which Karla gives nothing away. Karla refuses these advances and eventually returns to favour in the USSR, masterminding the Witchcraft/Source Merlin operations supporting the mole Gerald in the Circus. Karla possesses a cigarette lighter given to Smiley by his wife, which he took during Smiley's interrogation of him.

== Critical response ==
In a review for The New York Times written upon the novel's release in 1974, critic Richard Locke called Tinker Tailor Soldier Spy "fluently written," noting that "it is full of vivid character sketches of secret agents and bureaucrats from all levels of British society, and the dialogue catches their voices well." He praised the novel's realism, calling the detailing of "the day to day activities of the intelligence service at home and abroad" convincing. He noted that the "scale and complexity of this novel are much greater than in any of Le Carré's previous books," while the "characterisation too has become much richer."

An article published in in-house Central Intelligence Agency journal Studies in Intelligence, presumably written by agents under pseudonyms, called it "one of the most enduring renderings of the profession". It does question the "organisational compression" involved in the form of a large organisation, which the SIS would be, being reduced to a handful of senior operatives playing operational roles, but admits that this "works very well at moving the story along in print." However, the idea that a major counter-intelligence operation could be run without the knowledge of counter-intelligence professionals, an allusion to Smiley's investigation progressing in an undetected manner, is deemed an "intellectual stretch."

John Powers of NPR has called it the greatest spy story ever told, noting that it "offers the seductive fantasy of entering a secret world, one imagined with alluring richness." Le Carré himself considered the novel to be among his best works.

== Adaptations ==
=== Television ===
A TV adaptation of Tinker Tailor Soldier Spy was made by the BBC in 1979. It is a seven-part serial and was released in September of that year. The series was directed by John Irvin, produced by Jonathan Powell, and stars Alec Guinness as George Smiley, with Ian Richardson as Bill Haydon. Ricki Tarr was played by Hywel Bennett. In the US, syndicated broadcasts and DVD releases compressed the seven-part UK episodes into six, by shortening scenes and altering the narrative sequence.

=== Radio ===
In 1988, BBC Radio 4 broadcast a dramatisation, by Rene Basilico, of Tinker Tailor Soldier Spy in seven weekly half-hour episodes, produced by John Fawcett-Wilson. It is available as a BBC audiobook in CD and audio cassette formats. Notably, Bernard Hepton portrays George Smiley. Nine years earlier, he had portrayed Toby Esterhase in the television adaptation.

In 2009, BBC Radio 4 also broadcast new dramatisations, by Shaun McKenna, of the eight George Smiley novels by John le Carré, featuring Simon Russell Beale as Smiley. Tinker Tailor Soldier Spy was broadcast as three one-hour episodes, from Sunday 29 November to Sunday 13 December 2009, in BBC Radio 4's Classic Serial slot. The producer was Steven Canny. The series was repeated on BBC Radio 4 Extra in June and July 2016, and has since been released as a boxed set by the BBC.

=== Film ===
Swedish director Tomas Alfredson made a film adaptation in 2011, based on a screenplay by Bridget O'Connor and Peter Straughan. The film was released in the UK and Ireland on 16 September 2011, and in the United States on 9 December 2011. It includes a cameo appearance by Le Carré in the Christmas party scene as the older man in the grey suit who stands suddenly to sing the Soviet anthem. The film received numerous Academy Award nominations, including a nomination for Best Actor for Gary Oldman for his role as George Smiley. The film also stars Colin Firth as Bill Haydon, Benedict Cumberbatch as Peter Guillam, Tom Hardy as Ricki Tarr, and Mark Strong as Jim Prideaux.

== See also ==
- First Chief Directorate
