= Bill Haydon =

Fictional character by John le Carré

- First appearance: Tinker Tailor Soldier Spy
- Created by: John le Carré

In-universe information
- Gender: Male
- Occupation: Spy
- Affiliation: The Circus; KGB
- Nationality: British

Bill Haydon is a fictional character created by John le Carré who features in le Carré's 1974 novel Tinker Tailor Soldier Spy. He is a senior officer in the British Secret Intelligence Service who serves as a Soviet mole. The novel follows aging spymaster George Smiley's endeavours to uncover the mole. The character is partly modelled after the real-life double agent Kim Philby, part of the notorious Cambridge Five spy ring in Britain, who defected to the USSR in 1963.

== Biography ==
Haydon was born around 1917; no specific year is given but he is known to have been an undergraduate at Oxford University in 1937. He comes from an eminent family with connections throughout British high society; his father is a high court judge, and two of his several sisters married into the aristocracy. He is a cousin of Ann Smiley. A polymath of sorts with a brilliant and charming personality, he excels as a student, takes up remote languages with ease, and proves a somewhat gifted painter while at Oxford. He is identified for recruitment in the Circus (John le Carré's lightly fictionalised version of MI6) by his tutor and acts in turn as a talent-spotter among his classmates, most notably Jim Prideaux, who also becomes his lover. In World War II, Haydon builds a superb record in Nazi-occupied Europe and the Middle East, such that he elicits comparisons with Lawrence of Arabia. Unbeknown to the British, Haydon is also recruited as a Soviet agent around that time by Karla, Moscow Centre's crafty and legendary spymaster.

After the war, Haydon holds positions of increasing importance in the Circus, becomes its premier expert on the Soviet Union, and eventually rises to the senior staff of Control, the unnamed Chief of the Circus. In the early years of the Cold War, he limits his espionage activities to 'selected gifts of intelligence' that advance the Soviet cause over the American one without harming British interests. The Suez Crisis of 1956 convinces him that Britain has lost all influence as a world power and leads him to become a 'full-time Soviet mole with no holds barred.' In 1961, he formally receives Soviet citizenship, then achieves the rank of Soviet intelligence colonel and is awarded further Soviet decorations over the next ten years.

Control has come to suspect that there is a mole deep in the organization. By 1972, alone in this belief, he has ruled out all but his five senior lieutenants: Percy Alleline, Roy Bland, George Smiley, Toby Esterhase, and Haydon. To save his agent, Karla engineers the professional ruin of Control and Smiley whom he reckons to be the most likely to unmask Haydon. Karla is aware of Smiley's one personal weakness — his love for his wife Ann, who is a habitual adulteress — and orders Haydon to have an affair with her to cloud Smiley's judgment further. As Control is about to discover the truth, Karla lures him into ordering a doomed operation in Czechoslovakia to learn the identity of the mole from a (fake) Czech defector. Control picks Jim Prideaux for the operation and Haydon chooses to sacrifice his close friend to save himself. Prideaux is captured and reveals under duress the full extent of Control's knowledge of the mole to Karla before being repatriated to Britain and discharged from the Circus. Control is dismissed and dies soon afterwards, Smiley is forced into retirement, and Alleline becomes Chief. Haydon assumes control of London Station, in control of all foreign operations, effectively giving him unfettered access to intelligence worldwide.

In 1973, an indiscretion by a Soviet operative in Hong Kong confirms the existence of the mole to Oliver Lacon, the Civil Service overseer of the Circus in Whitehall. Smiley is recalled from retirement to investigate and ultimately unmasks Haydon after a tortuous, soul-searching quest. Under interrogation, Haydon reveals much of his secret past to Smiley and plans are set in motion to exchange Haydon for Western agents held in the Eastern Bloc, but before this happens he is killed while still in Circus custody. It is strongly implied, though never stated, that the killer was Prideaux.

== Background ==
Bill Haydon, with his easy charm and strong social connections, bears a close resemblance to real-life double agent Kim Philby whose defection to the USSR in 1963, and the consequent compromising of British agents, was a factor in the 1964 termination of Le Carré's own career in the SIS. Philby, along with Guy Burgess, Donald Maclean, Anthony Blunt, and John Cairncross, was part of a group of Soviet moles in Britain which later came to be known as the Cambridge Five. While in an earlier draft of the novel, there were reportedly greater similarities to Anthony Blunt, the final character is closely aligned with Philby.

According to Le Carré, Philby's career illustrates the "capacity of the British ruling class for reluctant betrayal and polite self-preservation," and that the British secret services are "microcosms of the British condition, of our social attitudes and vanities. In describing Philby, Le Carre wrote that "to the very end, he expected and received the indulgence owing to his moderation, good breeding and boyish, flirtatious charm." American film theorist David Bordwell notes that the description might be applied to Haydon as well.

The novel is set against a period of waning British influence on the world stage, with USA and USSR emerging as the dominant superpowers, albeit with conflicting ideologies. This forms the basis for Haydon's betrayal. He claims that, although he was recruited by Soviet intelligence at university in the 1930s, he only became a serious agent for them following the Suez Crisis when it became clear to him that Britain was no longer a world power and, in his view, was subservient to America. This perceived inferiority leads to Haydon developing a deep hatred for America, resolving him to damage them as much as possible by spying for the Soviets.

== Portrayals ==
Haydon was played by Ian Richardson in the 1979 BBC television serial based on the novel. In the 1988 BBC Radio 4 series, he was played by Edward de Souza. In the 2011 film adaptation, he was played by Colin Firth. In the 2011 Radio 4 series, The Complete Smiley, he was portrayed by Michael Feast. Dan Stevens will portray him in the television series Legacy of Spies.

=== In other media ===
The name Bill Haydon is also given to the character of an intelligence officer in Éric Rochant's 1994 thriller Les Patriotes, played by Bernard Le Coq. Rochant has spoken of Le Carré's influence on his own work.
