= Rich Man, Poor Man =

Rich Man, Poor Man may refer to:

- A line from the traditional counting poem "Tinker, Tailor"
- Rich Man, Poor Man (film), a lost 1918 American silent romantic drama
- Rich Man, Poor Man (novel), a 1969 novel by Irwin Shaw
- Rich Man, Poor Man (miniseries), a 1976 miniseries based on the novel
- Rich Man, Poor Man Book II, a sequel miniseries
- "Rich Man, Poor Man", a song by Peter, Paul and Mary from the album Late Again

== See also ==
- Rich and Poor (disambiguation)
- Rich Man, Poor Girl, a 1938 American comedy film
- Rich man and Lazarus, a parable of Jesus in the Gospel of Luke
