= Tinker Tailor Soldier Spy (soundtrack) =

Tinker Tailor Soldier Spy (Original Motion Picture Soundtrack)

Film score by Alberto Iglesias
- Released: 14 October 2011
- Genre: Film score
- Length: 59:21
- Label: Silva Screen Records
- Producer: Alberto Iglesias

Alberto Iglesias chronology
The Skin I Live In (2011)	Tinker Tailor Soldier Spy (2011)	I'm So Excited! (2012)

Tinker Tailor Soldier Spy (Original Motion Picture Soundtrack) is the score album to the 2011 film of the same name. The film's original score is composed by Alberto Iglesias and was released on 14 October 2011 by Silva Screen Records label. The music received positive reviews from critics, and Iglesias was nominated for Best Original Score category at the Academy Awards and British Academy Film Awards.

== Background ==
In a conversation with the film's director Tomas Alfredson and Iglesias, the former explained the story as "a film about loyalties and human relationships. Their spies are victims of this moment" which was what he told about the film. Iglesias said that "the film and the music show the more human side". A jazzy overture was played in the beginning to let viewers into the mind of the protagonist George Smiley (Gary Oldman).

Iglesias said that "There is a silent side of the characters, and the music in this film is trying to connect with the silence", hence he kept the music relatively downbeat. There is slight electronic played when characters speak in code, with a horn or tip-tapping piano music makes it more unsettling, as, according to Iglesias "the music is about the means behind the emotions and so not much about creating something beautiful".

== Reception ==
Jonathan Broxton wrote "The score works in context – as most scores do, unless they're really badly written – but unless your taste in scores is firmly rooted in the realms of 'unobtrusive and understated', you're unlikely to take much away from this work in terms of memorability or scope for repeat listenings." Filmtracks.com wrote "Like many of Iglesias' scores, Tinker Tailor Soldier Spy will only appeal to those familiar with and appreciative of the composer's techniques of restraint." A review from The Hollywood Reporter commented Iglesias "manages orchestral accompaniment with a sly subtle touch".

Seattle Post-Intelligencer writer Wesley Britton said "Throughout, Iglesias does indeed provide a listenable experience, although it's difficult not to have mental pictures to go with various passages, whether from the novel, original TV dramatization, or likely from the film for those who have seen it." James Christopher Monger of AllMusic wrote "Jazzy, brooding, elegant, and meticulous, Iglesias utilizes a wealth of instrumentation (horns, piano, clarinet, strings, drum kit) to ramp up the tension, casting an infectious cloud of late-night paranoia that's highly listenable, despite its dark intentions." Leslie Felperin of Variety wrote "Alberto Iglesias' creepy, stealthy score, which plays off well against the sound design, and kooky, wry soundtrack choices like a Julio Iglesias cover of Bobby Darin's "Beyond the Sea" and George Formby's "Mr. Wu's a Window Cleaner Now." Kimberley Jones of The Austin Chronicle wrote that Iglesias "provides the crucial aural analog, alternating bar to bar between moody and fusty-sounding".

== Track listing ==
No.	Title	Length
1.	"George Smiley"	5:19
2.	"Treasure"	1:47
3.	"Witchcraft"	1:28
4.	"Islay Hotel"	0:56
5.	"Control"	2:10
6.	"Polyakov"	1:50
7.	"Alleline and Bland on the Roof"	2:25
8.	"Safe House"	1:36
9.	"Tarr and Irina"	5:11
10.	"Anything Else?"	3:28
11.	"Jim Prideaux"	2:09
12.	"Thursgood"	2:45
13.	"Karla"	2:53
14.	"Esterhase"	4:57
15.	"Guillam"	1:26
16.	"Control and Westerby"	4:02
17.	"Circus"	5:26
18.	"One's Gone"	3:36
19.	"Tinker Tailor Soldier Spy"	5:57
Total length:		59:21

== Accolades ==
Award	Date of ceremony	Category	Recipient(s) and nominee(s)	Result
Academy Awards	26 February 2012	Best Original Score	Alberto Iglesias	Nominated
British Academy Film Awards	12 February 2012	Best Original Music	Alberto Iglesias	Nominated
Denver Film Critics Society	11 January 2012	Best Original Score	Alberto Iglesias	Nominated
European Film Awards	1 December 2012	Best Original Score	Alberto Iglesias	Won
Hollywood Film Festival	24 October 2011	Best Composer	Alberto Iglesias	Won
International Cinephile Society	22 February 2012	Best Original Score	Alberto Iglesias	Runner-up
Music & Sound Awards		Best Original Composition in a Film	Alberto Iglesias	Won
Spanish Film Music Critics Awards	29 June 2012	Best Spanish Composer	Alberto Iglesias	Won
World Soundtrack Academy	20 October 2012	Best Score of the Year	Alberto Iglesias	Won
World Soundtrack Academy	20 October 2012	Best Composer of the Year	Alberto Iglesias	Won

== Credits ==
Credits adapted from CD liner notes.

- Artwork – Stuart Ford
- Bass – Mary Scully
- Bassoon – Richard Skinner
- Cello – Anthony Pleeth
- Clarinet – Nicholas Bucknall
- Cor Anglais – Leila Ward
- Executive producer – Ana Eusa, David Stoner, Javier Martín, Nick Angel, Reynold D'Silva
- Flute – Jonathan Snowden
- Harp – Skaila Kanga
- Lacquer cut – LvC
- Music composed, conducted and produced by – Alberto Iglesias
- Oboe – David Theodore
- Orchestration – Everton Nelson
- Orchestra contractor – Isobel Griffiths
- Photography – Cristina Hortigüela
- Piano, producer – Javier Casado
- Recorded, mixed and mastered by – Jose Luis Crespo
- Trumpet – Andy Crowley
- Viola – Peter Lale
