= Milicent Bagot =

British intelligence officer (1907–2006)

Milicent Bagot CBE
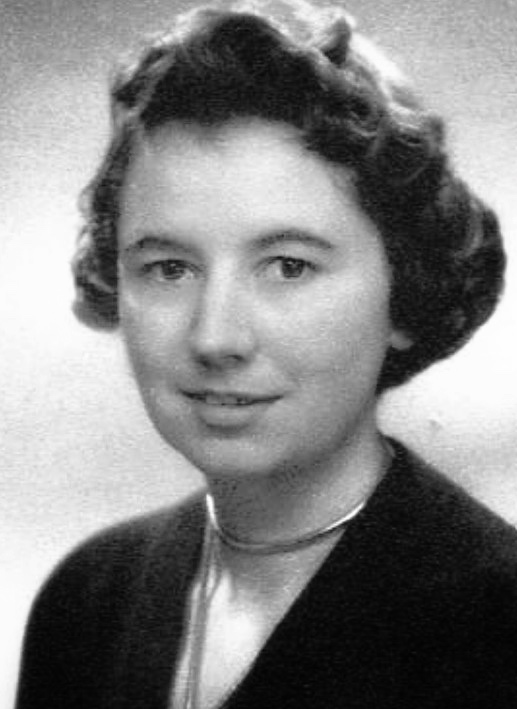
- Born: 28 March 1907; 68 York Mansions, Battersea, London, England
- Died: 26 May 2006 (aged 99); Jubilee House, Godalming, Surrey, England
- Education: Putney High School
- Alma mater: Lady Margaret Hall, University of Oxford
- Espionage activity
- Service branch: Metropolitan Police Special Branch
- Agency: MI5
- Active: World War II; Cold War
- Operations: Counterintelligence agent

Milicent Jessie Eleanor Bagot, CBE (28 March 1907 – 26 May 2006) was a British intelligence officer. She was the first woman to become an Assistant Director of MI5. Throughout her entire career for the British Empire, her job was to hunt down Soviet spies hidden within British and American intelligence. She was the purported model for the character Connie Sachs, the eccentric Sovietology expert who appeared in John le Carré's novels Tinker, Tailor, Soldier, Spy, The Honourable Schoolboy and Smiley's People, and the character of Muriel Edge in two of the 'Troy' novels by John Lawton – Black Out and Old Flames.

== Early life and education ==
Milicent Jessie Eleanor Bagot was born at 68 York Mansions in Battersea on 28 March 1907 to Ethel (née Garratt) (d. 1944) and Cecil Villiers Bagot, MA (1865–1940), a London solicitor. She was the paternal great-great-granddaughter of William Bagot, 1st Baron Bagot, 6th Baronet and the maternal granddaughter of Jesse Garratt, of Wateringbury, Kent.

Bagot was educated at Putney High School and Lady Margaret Hall, Oxford (MA), where she took a Class IV in Classical Moderations in 1927.

== Career ==
=== Career at Special Branch ===
In 1929, at the age of 22, Bagot joined the Metropolitan Police Special Branch as a temporary registry clerk. This was her first exposure to the work of collating sensitive information and compiling a complete evidentiary picture. At Special Branch's headquarters in Scotland Yard, Bagot worked with a small civilian analytical unit that included former army officers Hugh Miller, Guy Liddell, and Nigel Watson. This unit was tasked with investigating domestic communist activity. Their efforts to monitor radical socialist groups were complicated by internal security issues within the police. Discontent stemming from the 1918–1919 United Kingdom police strikes had left parts of the force vulnerable to infiltration.

In April 1929, the arrest of several serving detectives, including Inspector Hubert Ginhoven and Sergeant Charles Jane, along with former officers dismissed after the strike, revealed possible connections with two suspected Soviet front organizations: the Vigilant Detective Agency and the Federated Press of America, a news agency operating in London and Paris.

=== Transfer to MI5 ===
By 1931, Liddell and Miller knew that Special Branch had been compromised. They transferred several of its most capable staff, including Bagot, to the Security Service (MI5). Following the Statute of Westminster, MI5 now held responsibility for investigating espionage, sabotage, and subversive activity within the British Empire. The unit at MI5 that Bagot found herself working for was called "B Division," commanded by Brigadier Jasper Harker, where Guy Liddell served as Harker's deputy director.

Under Liddell's direction, Bagot focused on intelligence concerning the Communist International (Comintern). The move resulted in a forced significant pay cut of £8 a year, a not inconsiderable sum at the time.

She established a large card index cataloguing individuals identified in the MASK intercepts, wireless transmissions through which the Communist Party of Great Britain and affiliated organizations abroad received encrypted instructions from Moscow, using a cipher derived from Treasure Island. These intercepts provided unique insight into Comintern operations until December 1936, when Soviet communication methods were altered.

=== World War II ===
During the Second World War, Bagot worked as a clerk in the Registry and the counter subversion section, at Wormwood Scrubs and later at Blenheim Palace. Her knowledge was supposed to have impressed J Edgar Hoover.

Following the reorganization of MI5 in 1940, Bagot was assigned to section F2(b), part of the counter-subversion division under Roger Hollis. Her extensive knowledge of members of the Communist Party of Great Britain proved valuable in supporting counter-espionage operations. Among her assignments was a detailed investigation into the activities of Oliver Green, a former Spanish Civil War volunteer who operated a printing business on Edgware Road. Surveillance of Green uncovered links to six associates and evidence suggesting that the Main Intelligence Directorate (GRU) had developed an espionage network within British military establishments, later referred to as the Robson–Gibbons ring. Although no prosecutions followed, Bagot's comprehensive analysis became a model for later intelligence studies.

Bagot was the first person in the whole of MI5 to develop a suspicion about Ursula Kuczynski and her husband, Len Beurton, when they settled in Oxfordshire in 1941. Bagot's bosses said she "could smell a rat at 20 paces," and she sensed "an entire nest" in this couple. She reached out to her contacts in the Oxfordshire Police, and requested they discreetly investigate the family, which uncovered crucial clues: they lived comfortably without jobs and had a large wireless set with a special aerial pole. Her boss, Roger Hollis, repeatedly dismissed the clues she and others uncovered (like the radio mast and the illegal transmitter). This dynamic gave rise to a long-standing conspiracy theory that Hollis was a Soviet spy protecting Ursula, though the author Ben Macintyre suggests that Hollis was more likely incompetent. Bagot's concerns were consistently overruled.

Additionally, when Klaus Fuchs was being vetted to join the top-secret Manhattan Project, Bagot was the only person to raise an objection, but her concerns were overruled.

By 1944, Bagot was widely recognized as MI5's leading authority on Soviet espionage. In June of that year, she embarrassed her counterparts in the Secret Intelligence Service (SIS) by exposing the inaccuracy of a document from Madrid that was claimed to be a valuable intelligence source. The document, purportedly compiled by the Spanish Falange and listing fifty British communists, was shown by Bagot to contain serious errors, including references to three individuals she knew had died years earlier.

She later spent time in the Middle East advising on how to counter Soviet subversion to British authorities in the area.

=== Cold War ===
Her request to join the British Control Commission for Austria was denied by MI5's Director-General, Sir David Petrie, who considered her indispensable and warned that she would have to resign if she persisted. Seeking a change, she briefly transferred to SIS before returning to MI5 to lead a newly established research section, designated E1, with the rank of Assistant Director, becoming the first woman to hold such a senior position in the British intelligence services. She was appointed MBE in 1949.

When Kim Philby fell under suspicion in 1951 following the defection of his associate Guy Burgess, Bagot informed Arthur Martin, one of the investigators examining Philby's background, that she had access to a confidential source indicating that Philby had once been a communist. Although she never disclosed the exact nature of this information, it dated from before Philby's notably rapid shift, prior to the war, from left-wing sympathies to membership in the pro-Nazi Anglo-German Fellowship. Bagot's doubts about his loyalty were later confirmed when Philby defected to Moscow in January 1963.

== Retirement and later life ==
Upon her retirement in 1967, Bagot was promoted to Commander of the Order of the British Empire (CBE) and was tasked by MI5's director-general, Sir Martin Furnival Jones, with responding to allegations made that same year in the Zinoviev Letter by Sunday Times journalists Lewis Chester, Stephen Fay, and Hugo Young.

The authors had claimed that British intelligence officers deliberately circulated a forged letter to influence the October 1924 general election and undermine the Labour Party's chances of re-election.

Over the course of three years, Bagot produced a detailed memorandum contending that officers of the Secret Intelligence Service had leaked what they believed to be a genuine directive from Grigory Zinoviev, president of the Comintern, to the Communist Party of Great Britain. This was known as the Zinoviev Affair, in which the directive supposedly urged the British working class to rise up in an armed insurrection. The forged letter probably originated from anti-Soviet emigrants living in Latvia.

Although her report remained classified within MI5's archives, it was later drawn upon by Foreign Office historian Gill Bennett in 1997 for her official study, released at the request of Foreign Secretary Robin Cook, who had long suspected a political conspiracy to displace Ramsay MacDonald in favour of Stanley Baldwin in the 1924 United Kingdom general election.

Following her official retirement, she continued to work part-time for MI5 and remained active in the service's choir until 1976. After suffering a stroke in 2001, she moved to Jubilee House nursing home in Godalming, Surrey, where she died on 26 May 2006.

== Recognition and commemoration ==
Bagot was made an MBE in 1949 and promoted to CBE in 1967. She lived in Putney for most of her life.

A blue plaque was unveiled on 15 October 2021 at Milicent Bagot's former home in Putney, which was unveiled by the Putney High School Headmistress, Suzie Longstaff.
