= Diana Ross (author) =

English children's author (1910–2000)

- Born: 8 July 1910; Valletta, Malta Colony
- Died: 4 May 2000 (aged 89); Gosforth, Newcastle upon Tyne, England
- Occupations: Writer, teacher, illustrator, fine artist
- Writing career
- Pen name: Gri (illustrations)
- Period: 20th century
- Subjects: Children's literature, picture books

Diana Patience Beverly Ross (8 July 1910 – 4 May 2000) was an English children's author. A graduate of the Central School of Art in London, she also worked on sculpture and graphic arts and illustrated several of her own books under the name of her cat, Gri.

== Life and work ==
Ross was born in Malta, where her father was in command of HMS Diana. She was educated in Britain and in Paris, and read history at Girton College, Cambridge.

In her early twenties, Ross worked at the Grenfell Mission orphanage in St. Anthony, Newfoundland, and would later help Wilfred Grenfell to research his The Romance of Labrador, as well as drawing the book's illustrations.

Beginning with The Little Red Engine Gets a Name (1942), followed by The Story of the Little Red Engine (1945) and seven more volumes, Ross created a series of picture books which followed the adventures of the same character. Jan Le Witt and George Him provided the illustrations for the first volume and Leslie Wood its sequels.

Ross had several of her short works read for BBC Radio broadcasts for children, and wrote several volumes of modern fairy tales for older children. She also had an uncredited part in the creation of the BBC children's television series Camberwick Green.

== Selected works ==
- The Beetle who Lived Alone (London: Faber and Faber, 1941), illustrated by Margaret Kaye
- The Little Red Engine Gets a Name (London: Faber and Faber, 1942), illustrated by Lewitt and Him
- The Story of Louisa (Penguin, 1945), illustrated by Margaret Kaye
- The Story of the Little Red Engine (London: Faber and Faber, 1945), illustrated by Leslie Wood
- Whoo Whoo the Wind Blew (London: Faber and Faber, 1946), illustrated by Leslie Wood
- The Little Red Engine goes to Market (London: Faber and Faber, 1946), illustrated by Leslie Wood
- Ebenezer the Big Balloon (London: Faber and Faber), illustrated by Leslie Wood
- The Little Red Engine Goes to Town (London: Faber and Faber), illustrated by Leslie Wood
- William and the Lorry (London: Faber and Faber), illustrated by Shirley Hughes
- The Little Red Engine Goes Home (London: Faber and Faber), illustrated by Leslie Wood
- The Little Red Engine Goes Travelling (London: Faber and Faber), illustrated by Leslie Wood
- The Merry-Go-Round (Lutterworth Press, 1963), illustrated by Shirley Hughes
- Old Perisher (London: Faber and Faber, 1965), illustrated by Edward Ardizzone
- The Little Red Engine Goes to be Mended (London: Faber and Faber, 1966), illustrated by Leslie Wood
- The Little Red Engine and the Taddlecombe Outing (London: Faber and Faber, 1968), illustrated by Leslie Wood
- The Little Red Engine Goes Carolling (London: Faber and Faber, 1971), illustrated by Leslie Wood
