= The Albert Palace =

Coordinates: 51°28′34″N 0°09′11″W

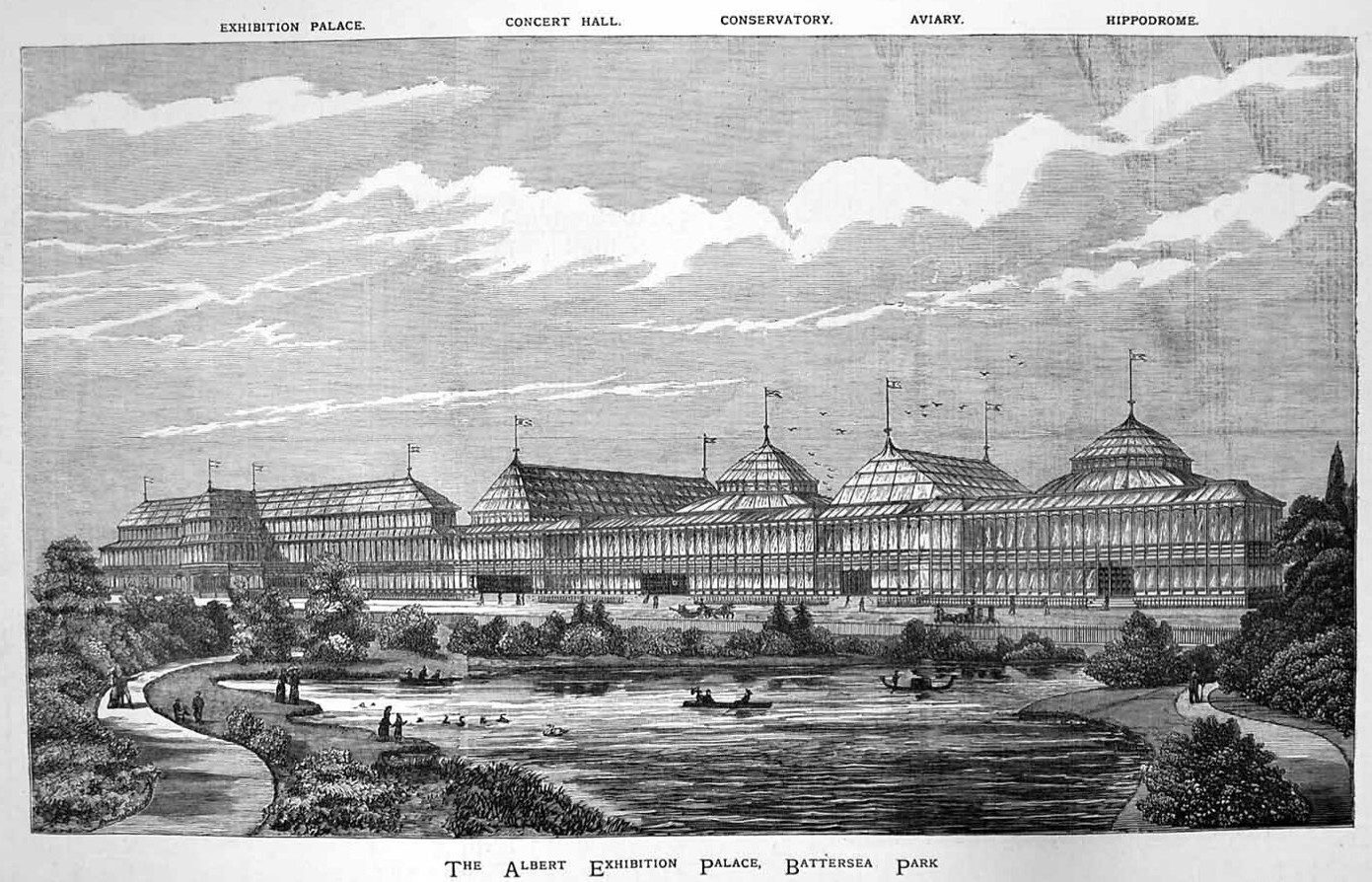
The Albert Palace, captioned (from left to right) the Exhibition Palace, the Concert Hall, the Conservatory, the Aviary and the Hippodrome

The Albert Palace was a large building located in Battersea, in the borough of Wandsworth, London. It faced, and formed a backdrop to the lake in Battersea Park, and was a re-erection of an iron and glass structure, like The Crystal Palace of 1851, which had partly housed the Dublin International Exhibition of 1865.

In 1882, a company, the Albert Palace Association Limited, was created to dismantle the temporary structure in Ireland, ship it to London and re-site it on Prince of Wales Road (now known as Prince of Wales Drive, London).

== Building ==
The main building fronted Prince of Wales Road and was of glass with an iron frame. The south side, along what is now Lurline Gardens, was built of brick, faced with Bath stone and Portland stone which had come from the old Law Courts at Westminster, demolished in 1883 after the opening of the new Royal Courts of Justice on the Strand.

The central part of the finished palace consisted of a 473-foot nave with a central 'apse' for an orchestra. The Connaught Hall Concert Room at the west end and a tea room to the east increased the total length to about 675 feet.

The interior was decorated with the assistance of the designer and decorative artist, Christopher Dresser.

== Gardens ==
Plans were made to extend the palace’s gardens westwards and a piece of land was acquired from the Commissioners of Works and Public Buildings for £10,000, extending to what is now Forfar Road and down to Battersea Park Road on the south. This is the site now occupied by York Mansions and the former Battersea Polytechnic. The land had originally been leased to Lloyd, Bogue & Allin for building houses, but only the roads had been laid out. The site extended to just over ten acres.

The gardens were designed by Sir Edward Lee with further terraces to the north beside the main Prince of Wales Road entrance. The gardens included fountains, a conservatory and a bandstand.

== Grand opening and exhibitions ==
A grand opening took place on 6 June 1885 with a concert in the Connaught Hall. The day was wet so the 5,000 visitors mostly fell back on the indoor amusements – exhibition stands, aquarium, picture-gallery, refreshment rooms and bars.

Throughout the autumn and winter of 1885 the permanent orchestra and organist gave concerts with, as an added attraction, the Viennese Ladies Orchestra. Cat shows, bird shows and flower shows were also held, and for his ‘Indian Village’ Arthur Lasenby Liberty brought to The Albert Palace silk spinners and weavers, carpet makers, metal workers, sandalwood carvers, embroiderers, a sitar maker, singers, dancers, jugglers and snake-charmers from India.

In the gardens to the west, now occupied by York Mansions, crowd pullers included the diving bell, gymnastic displays and ballooning.

== Closure ==
But there was an inherent problem with The Albert Palace, public access was not free, whereas across the road at Battersea Park it was. Almost immediately, financial problems set in. Easy access to the palace formed the basis of hopes of success in attracting people from all over south London but visitors came in insufficient numbers. By 1888, the palace was permanently closed, slowly becoming a ruin with sparrows nesting in the organ.

Great efforts were made to save the building, the Vicar of Battersea headed an acquisition committee. But the stumbling block was that anyone purchasing the freehold would have to take it subject to the lease which, technically, still belonged to the original promoters – the Albert Palace Association. The association was now in liquidation in Chancery which would mean taking on a lawsuit, and so the land went to the building developers. Albert Palace Mansions and Prince of Wales Mansions stand on the site of the palace itself. Battersea Polytechnic (built in 1893) and York Mansions (built in 1897) replaced the gardens.

The palace's organ survived the demolition of the building and eventually ended up in Fort Augustus Abbey in Scotland.
