= George Him =

Polish-born British designer (1900-1982)

- George Him aged 75, holding a photograph of himself age 5
- Born: Jerzy Himmelfarb; 4 August 1900; Łódź, Poland, Russian Empire
- Died: 4 April 1982 (aged 81); Hampstead, United Kingdom
- Education: University of Bonn; Leipzig Academy of Graphic Art

George Him (4 August 1900 – 4 April 1982) was a Polish-born British designer responsible for a number of notable posters, book illustrations and advertising campaigns for a wide range of clients.

== Biography ==
Him was born Jerzy Himmelfarb in 1900 to a Polish-Jewish family in Łódź, Poland which was then occupied by the Russian Empire After schooling and further education in Warsaw Him studied Roman Law in Moscow but left in 1917 when the Russian Revolution forced the closure of the university he was attending. He moved to Bonn and by 1924 had completed a PhD at the University of Bonn on the comparative history of religions before deciding to study graphic art in Leipzig. Him studied at the Leipzig Academy of Graphic Art but even before he graduated in 1928 was already undertaking commercial commissions. Him returned to Poland where, in 1933, he changed his name and also established a design partnership with Jan Le Witt. Working as Lewitt-Him, the two established a distinctive design style which combined cubist and surrealist elements, often in a humorous context. Their most notable work in Poland were illustrations for an experimental poetry group known as Skamander.

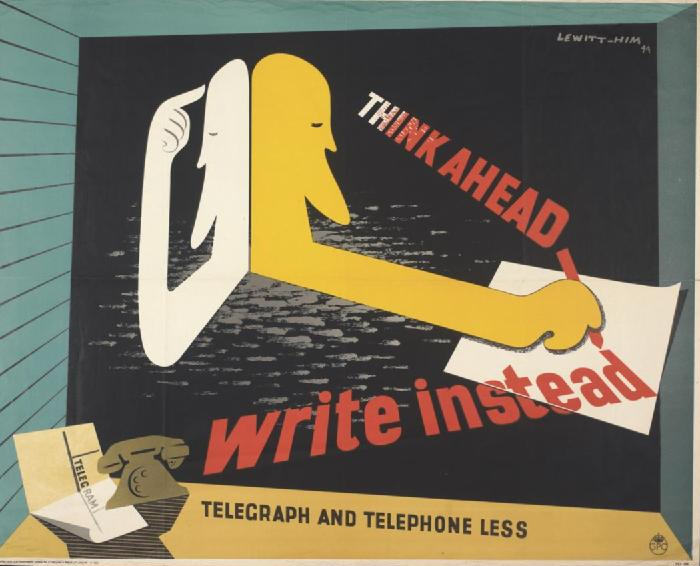
Think Ahead Telegraph and Telephone Less (Art.IWM PST 8414) (1944) by LeWitt-Him for the GPO

Him and Le Witt worked together in Poland for several years before, in 1937, they relocated the Lewitt-Him design business to London, following an exhibition of their work there by the publishers Lund Humphries. The pair quickly gained commercial contracts with London Transport and Imperial Airways as well as illustrating children's books, such as The Little Red Engine Gets a Name (1942) by Diana Ross. In London during World War II the partnership received notable commissions for information and public safety posters from, among others, the General Post Office, the Royal Society for the Prevention of Accidents and the Ministry of Information.

Him was naturalised as a British citizen in 1948 and the Lewitt-Him partnership enjoyed great success. Notable commissions included designing the giant umbrella tree for the Wet Weather section of the 1946 Britain Can Make It exhibition, the Guinness clock tower for Battersea Park Pleasure Gardens and murals for the Education Pavilion of the 1951 Festival of Britain. The Lewitt-Him partnership was dissolved in 1954, when Le Witt decided to focus on developing his abstract paintings and artworks. Him continued to work as a commercial designer. Among the advertising campaigns he illustrated was the 1950s Schweppeshire campaign for the Schweppes drinks company. Him's other clients numbered several airlines, including Pan-American Airways, El Al and American Overseas Airlines plus the publishers of Punch and Penguin Books. He continued to illustrate books but also designed exhibition stands, such as the Australia stand at the 1960 Ideal Home Exhibition and large window displays, notably for the De Bijenkorf store in Rotterdam and the 1961 Christmas windows for the Design Centre in London.

From 1969 until 1977, Him taught graphic design at Leicester Polytechnic. Him was an active artist up until the very end of his life. Two retrospective exhibitions of his work have been held, one in 1976 at the London College of Printing and another in 1978 at the Ben Uri Gallery in London. An exhibition is currently on at the House of Illustration, London, until 10 May 2020. In 1977 Him was awarded the Francis Williams Book Illustration Award and in 1978 became a Royal Designer for Industry.

Him died at Royal Free Hospital in Hampstead, England on 4 April 1982 at the age of 79.
