= Zinoviev letter =

Forged document by the Daily Mail

The Zinoviev letter was a forged document published and sensationalised by the Daily Mail newspaper four days before the 1924 United Kingdom general election, which was held on 29 October. The letter purported to be a directive from Grigory Zinoviev, the head of the Communist International (Comintern) in Moscow, to the Communist Party of Great Britain (CPGB), ordering it to engage in seditious activities. It stated that the normalisation of British–Soviet relations under a Labour Party government would radicalise the British working class and put the CPGB in a favourable position to pursue a Bolshevik-style revolution. It further suggested that these effects would extend throughout the British Empire. The right-wing press depicted the letter as a grave foreign subversion of British politics and blamed the incumbent Labour government under Ramsay MacDonald for promoting the policy of political reconciliation and open trade with the Soviet Union on which the scheme appeared to depend. The election resulted in the fall of the first Labour government and a strong victory for the Conservative Party and the continued collapse of the Liberal Party. Labour supporters often blamed the letter, at least in part, for their party's defeat.

The letter was widely taken to be authentic upon publication and for some time afterwards, but historians now agree it was a forgery. The letter perhaps aided the Conservative Party by hastening the ongoing collapse of the Liberal Party vote, which, in turn, produced a Conservative landslide. A. J. P. Taylor argued that the letter's most important impact was on the mindset of Labourites, who for years afterwards blamed foul play for their defeat, thereby misunderstanding the political forces at work and postponing what Taylor regarded as necessary reforms in the Labour Party.

== History ==
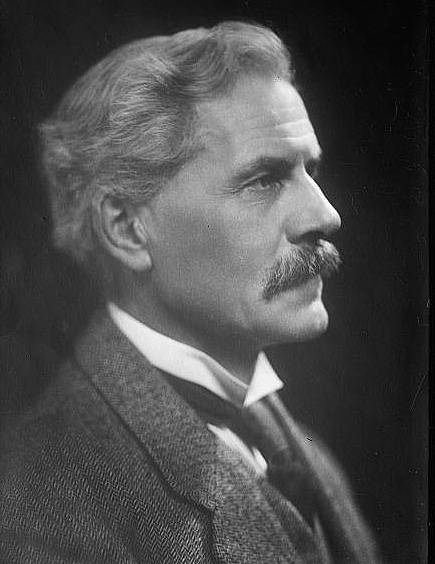
Ramsay MacDonald, head of the short-lived Labour government of 1924

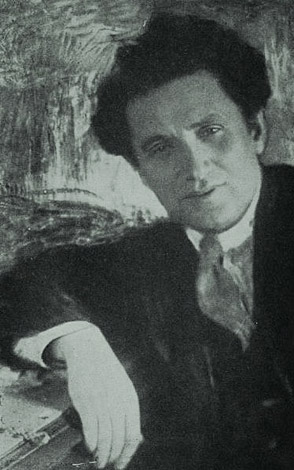
Grigory Zinoviev, head of the Executive Committee of the Comintern

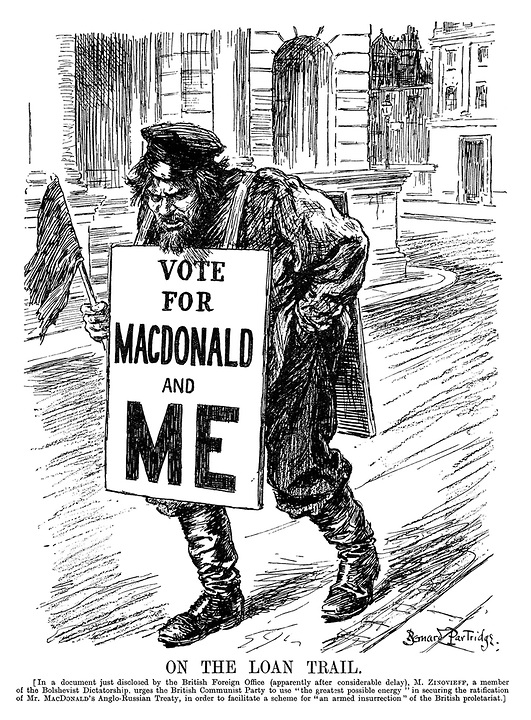
A cartoon from Punch, published after the letter was released, depicting a caricatured Bolshevik wearing a sandwich board with the slogan "Vote for MacDonald and me"

=== Background ===
On 22 January 1924, the Labour Party formed a government in the United Kingdom for the first time. However, it was a minority government and therefore liable to fall if the Conservatives and Liberals combined against it. In foreign policy, Ramsay MacDonald used Royal Prerogative to grant official recognition to the Soviet Union in February 1924. The Labour Government also proposed to lend it money and to open up trade in return for a settlement of Russia's prewar debts which the Soviets had repudiated, but these measures met resistance in Parliament. The Government was then defeated on 8 October 1924 in the House of Commons because of its decision to drop the prosecution of communist editor John Ross Campbell under the Incitement to Mutiny Act 1797, for publication of an open letter in Workers' Weekly calling on soldiers to "let it be known that, neither in the class war nor in a military war, will you turn your guns on your fellow workers, but instead will line up with your fellow workers in an attack upon the exploiters and capitalists, and will use your arms on the side of your own class.". The vote was on a motion by the Liberals, who had until then supported the continuation of the minority government while also blocking many of its signature policy initiatives, for a select committee to investigate the Government's actions; MacDonald had made clear that he would treat the vote as a motion of no confidence. Instead of resigning, MacDonald obtained permission from King George V for a dissolution of Parliament and the holding of a new election. A general election was scheduled for 29 October.

=== Letter ===
Near the end of the short election campaign, there appeared in the Daily Mail newspaper the text of a letter addressed to the Central Committee of the Communist Party of Great Britain (CPGB) purporting to have originated from Grigory Zinoviev, head of the Executive Committee of the Communist International (Comintern); Secretary of the Comintern Otto Wille Kuusinen; and Arthur MacManus, a British representative at a conference of the Executive Committee. It predicted that the Labour government's attempted normalisation of Britain's diplomatic and economic relations with the Soviet Union would not only profit the latter but also stir the British proletariat to revolutionary action and allow Soviet influence throughout the British Empire to widen. One particularly damaging section of this letter read:

A settlement of relations between the two countries will assist in the revolutionising of the international and British proletariat not less than a successful rising in any of the working districts of England, as the establishment of close contact between the British and Russian proletariat, the exchange of delegations and workers, etc., will make it possible for us to extend and develop the propaganda of ideas of Leninism in England and the Colonies.

=== Publication ===
The document was published in the conservative Daily Mail newspaper four days before the election and then picked up by other right-wing newspapers. The letter rankled at a sensitive time in relations between Britain and the Soviet Union, owing to vehement Conservative opposition to the parliamentary ratification of the Anglo-Soviet trade agreement of 8 August.

The publication of the letter was severely embarrassing to Prime Minister MacDonald and his Labour Party. Although his party faced a high likelihood of losing office, MacDonald had not given up hope in the campaign. Following the letter's publication, any chance of an upset victory was dashed, as the spectre of internal unrest and a government oblivious to, or even complicit in, the alleged peril thereof dominated the headlines and public discourse. MacDonald's attempts to cast doubt on the authenticity of the letter were in vain, hampered by the document's widespread acceptance among government officials. He told his Cabinet that he "felt like a man sewn in a sack and thrown into the sea.".

=== Election result ===
The Conservatives decisively won the October 1924 election, ending the country's first Labour government. After the Conservatives formed a government with Stanley Baldwin as Prime Minister, a Cabinet committee investigated the letter and concluded that it was genuine. The Conservative government did not undertake any further investigation, despite continuing suggestions that the letter was forged. On 21 November 1924, the government cancelled the unratified trade agreement with the Soviet Union. At about this juncture, MI5 determined secretly that the letter was beyond question a forgery. In order to protect its reputation and to keep the myth of Labour's acquiescence to the Soviet Union alive, it did not inform the rest of the government, which continued to treat it as genuine.

The Conservatives gained 155 seats, for a total of 413 seats. Labour lost 40 seats, retaining 151. The Liberals lost 118 seats, were left with only 40, and lost over a million votes.

=== Denial by Zinoviev ===
The Comintern and the Soviet government strongly and consistently denied the authenticity of the document. Grigory Zinoviev issued a denial on 27 October 1924 (two days before the election), which was finally published in English in the December 1924 issue of The Communist Review, the monthly theoretical magazine of the CPGB, well after the MacDonald government had already fallen. Zinoviev declared:

The letter of 15th September, 1924, which has been attributed to me, is from the first to the last word, a forgery. Let us take the heading. The organisation of which I am the president never describes itself officially as the "Executive Committee of the Third Communist International"; the official name is "Executive Committee of the Communist International." Equally incorrect is the signature, "The Chairman of the Presidium." The forger has shown himself to be very stupid in his choice of the date. On the 15th of September, 1924, I was taking a holiday in Kislovodsk, and, therefore, could not have signed any official letter. [...] It is not difficult to understand why some of the leaders of the Liberal-Conservative bloc had recourse to such methods as the forging of documents. Apparently they seriously thought they would be able, at the last minute before the elections, to create confusion in the ranks of those electors who sincerely sympathise with the Treaty between England and the Soviet Union. It is much more difficult to understand why the English Foreign Office, which is still under the control of the Prime Minister, MacDonald, did not refrain from making use of such a white-guardist forgery.

=== Impact ===
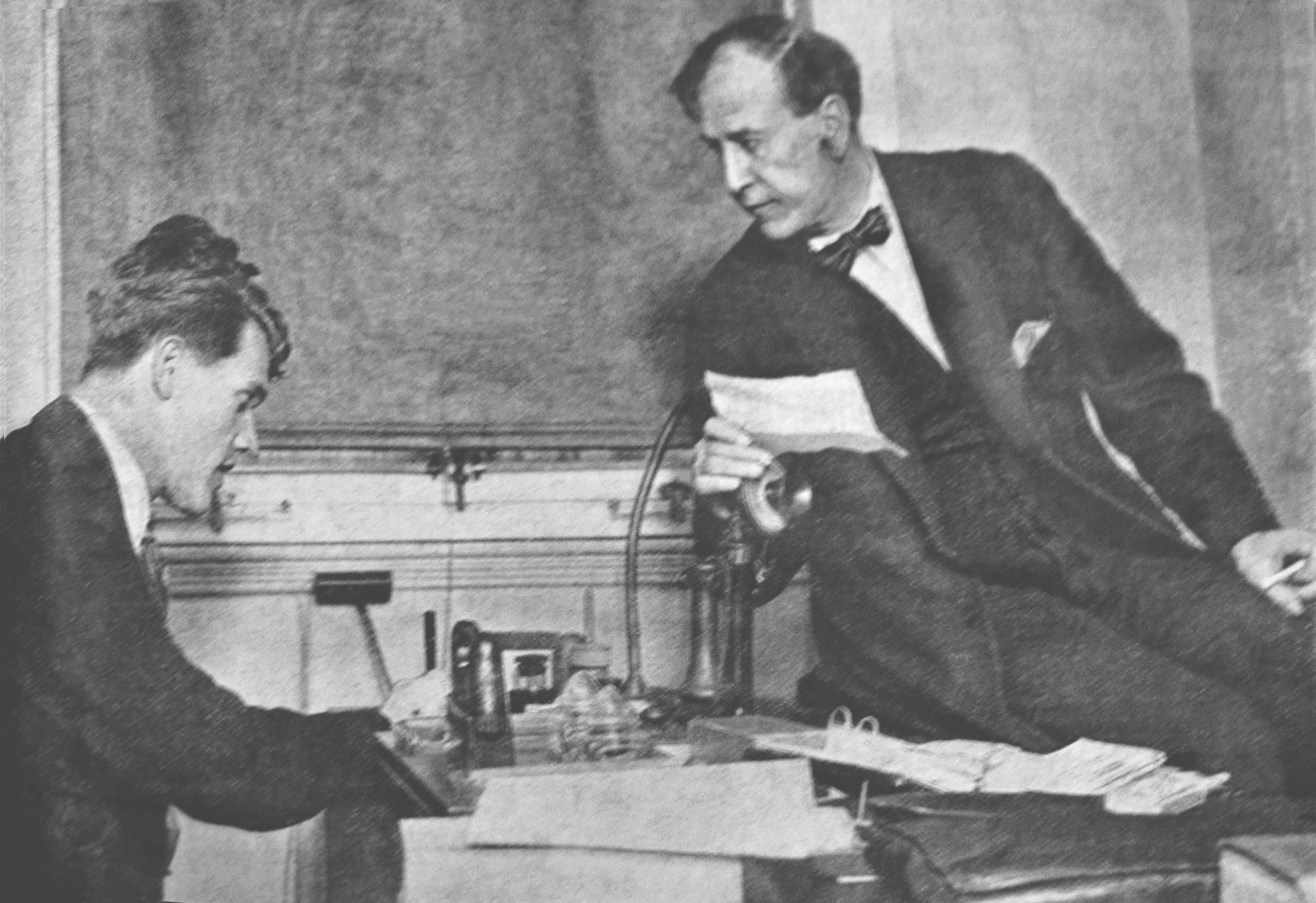
Christian Rakovsky dictates a note to the British government in response to the Zinoviev letter, denying its authenticity.

Most historians now agree that the letter had little immediate impact on the Labour vote, which not only held up but, in fact, increased slightly in terms of its share of the popular vote (although the main reason for this uptick was that the party fielded candidates in 87 more constituencies than it had in the previous election). Still, the letter helped to propel the Conservatives to a large parliamentary majority by allowing them to poach voters frightened by the First Red Scare from the withering Liberal bloc. The Conservative politician Robert Rhodes James claimed that the letter provided Labour "with a magnificent excuse for failure and defeat. The inadequacies that had been exposed in the Government in its brief existence could be ignored". Indeed, many Labourites for years blamed the letter, at least in part, for the defeat of the party. Commentators such as Taylor believed that the party's subsequent failure to address demonstrated policy inadequacies, such as unemployment and relations with the trade unions, was because the letter was blamed for the defeat, and not the political programme.

The real significance of the election was that the Liberal Party, whom Labour had displaced as the second-largest political party in 1922, became a minor party, its select committee gambit having completely backfired.

A 1967 British study concluded the Labour Party was destined for defeat in October 1924 in any event and argued that the primary effect of the purported Comintern communiqué fell on Anglo-Soviet relations:

Under Baldwin, the British Government led the diplomatic retreat from Moscow. Soviet Russia became more isolated, and, of necessity, more isolationist. [...] The Zinoviev letter hardened attitudes, and hardened them at a time when the Soviet Union was becoming more amenable to diplomatic contact with the capitalist world. The proponents of world revolution were being superseded by more pliant subscribers to the Stalin's philosophy of "Building Socialism in One Country". Thus, after successfully weathering all the early contradictions in Soviet Diplomacy, Britain gave up when the going was about to become much easier. And it gave up largely because the two middle-class parties suddenly perceived that their short-term electoral advantage was best served by a violent anti-Bolshevik campaign.

== Current scholarship ==
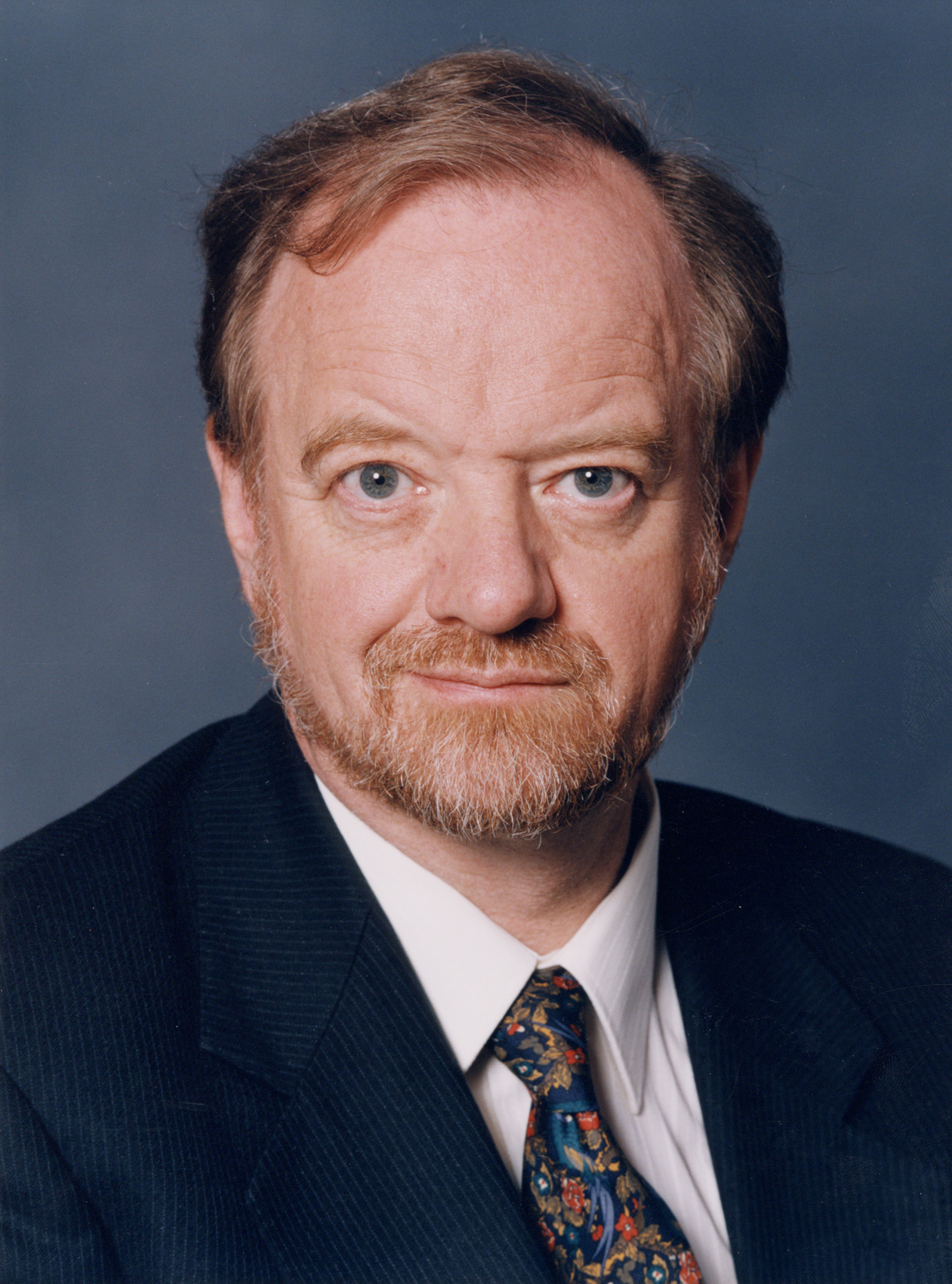
Foreign Secretary Robin Cook launched an official historical review of the Zinoviev letter in 1998

Contemporary scholarship on the Zinoviev letter dates from a 1967 monograph published by three British journalists working for The Sunday Times. The authors, Lewis Chester, Steven Fay and Hugo Young, asserted that two members of a Russian monarchist organisation called the "Brotherhood of St. George" composed the document in Berlin. Irina Bellegarde, the widow of Alexis Bellegarde, one of the two men said to have written the document, stated that she had witnessed the forgery as it was performed. She said that her husband had drafted the letter after fellow-émigré Alexander Gumansky told him that a request to forge the letter had come from "a person in authority in London". Gurmansky and Bellegarde were later sentenced to death in absentia by a Soviet court. Bellegarde was later forced to work during the Second World War for the Russian section of the Abwehr (German military intelligence) in Berlin. Some evidence suggests that he was the highly effective British double agent known as "Outcast". He had been an important source on Soviet matters for the Secret Intelligence Service (SIS; commonly known as MI6) since the First World War, raising the possibility that he already had deep links to British intelligence when involved in the fabrication of the Zinoviev letter.

The forgers appear to have studied Bolshevik documents and signatures extensively before creating the letter to undermine the Soviet regime's relations with the United Kingdom. The British Foreign Office had received the forgery on 10 October 1924, two days after the defeat of the MacDonald government on the no-confidence motion initiated by the Liberals. Despite the dubious nature of the document, wheels were set in motion for its publication, members of the Conservative Party combining with Foreign Office officials in what Chester, Fay, and Young characterised as a "conspiracy".

These findings and allegations motivated the British Foreign Office to undertake a study of their own. For three years, Milicent Bagot of MI5 examined the archives and conducted interviews with surviving witnesses. She produced a long account of the affair, but the paper ultimately proved unpublishable because it contained sensitive operational and personnel information. Nevertheless, Bagot's work proved important as a secondary source when the Foreign Office revisited the matter three decades later. In the first two months of 1998, rumours of a forthcoming book on the true origins of the Zinoviev letter, based on information from Soviet archives, led to renewed press speculation and parliamentary questions. In response, Foreign Secretary Robin Cook announced on 12 February that, in the interests of openness, he had commissioned the historians of the Foreign and Commonwealth Office to prepare a historical memorandum on the Zinoviev letter, drawing upon archival documents.

A paper by the Chief Historian of the Foreign and Commonwealth Office, Gill Bennett, was published in January 1999 and contains the results of this inquiry. Bennett had free and unfettered access to the archives of the Foreign Office, as well as those of the Secret Intelligence Service (SIS) and MI5. She also visited Moscow in the course of her research, working in the archives of the Executive Committee of the Communist International, the Central Committee of the Communist Party of the Soviet Union and the Comintern archive of the Communist Party of Great Britain. Although not every operational detail could be published because of British secrecy laws, the publicly available extracts of Bennett's paper still provided a rich account of the Zinoviev letter affair. Her report showed that the letter contained statements very similar to those made by Zinoviev to other communist parties and at other times to the CPGB, but at the time of the letter (when Anglo-Soviet trade talks were taking place and a general election was impending), Zinoviev and the Soviet government had adopted a more restrained attitude towards propaganda in Britain. Despite her extensive research, she concluded "it is impossible to say who wrote the Zinoviev Letter", though her best guess was that it was commissioned by White Russian intelligence circles from forgers in Berlin or the Baltic states, most likely in Riga. It was then leaked to the papers, probably by MI6, that she had stated, "I have my doubts as to whether [Desmond Morton] thought it was genuine but he treated it as if it was."

In 2006, Bennett incorporated some of her findings on the Zinoviev letter into chapter four of her biography of SIS agent Desmond Morton. Another 2006 book on spycraft attributes authorship to Vladimir Orlov, a former intelligence agent of Baron Wrangel during the Russian Civil War. The British historian Nigel West wrote that the OGPU (Soviet secret police) always initiated investigations into leaks of Soviet documents and into mishandlings of propaganda, and the fact no investigation was opened after the publication of the Zinoviev letter indicates it was certainly a forgery.

In 2017, the British government stated that it had lost a file on the Zinoviev letter scandal. The government added that they were unable to determine whether copies of the material had been made.

In 2018, Bennett published her book The Zinoviev Letter: The Conspiracy that Never Dies.

== See also ==
- Campbell Case
- October surprise
- Zimmermann Telegram
