= Prince of Wales Drive, London =

Street in Battersea, London

Coordinates: 51.4758°N 0.1555°W

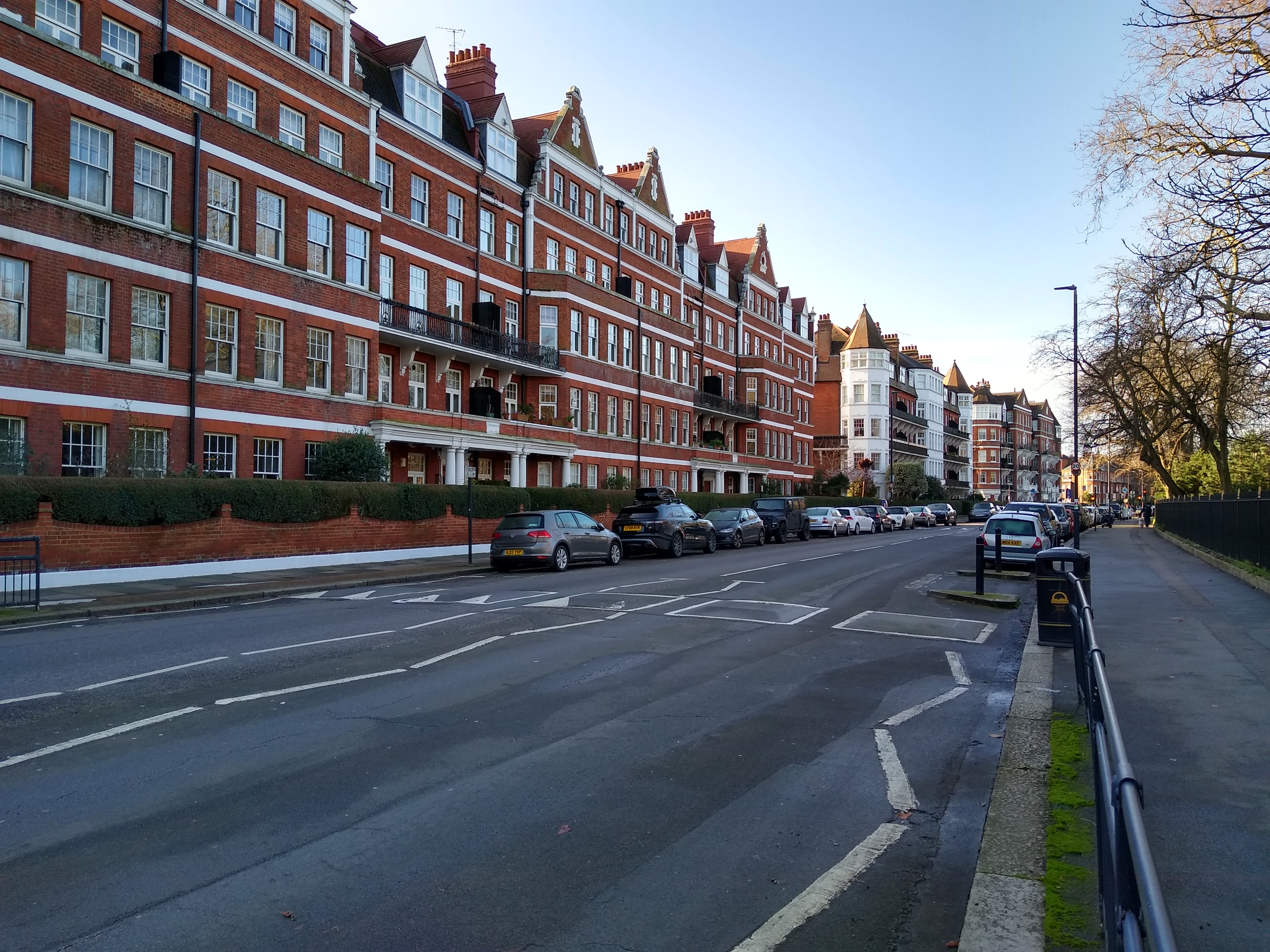
Prince of Wales Drive

Prince of Wales Drive is a street in Battersea, in the London borough of Wandsworth. It is situated on the southern perimeter of Battersea Park.

== Overview ==
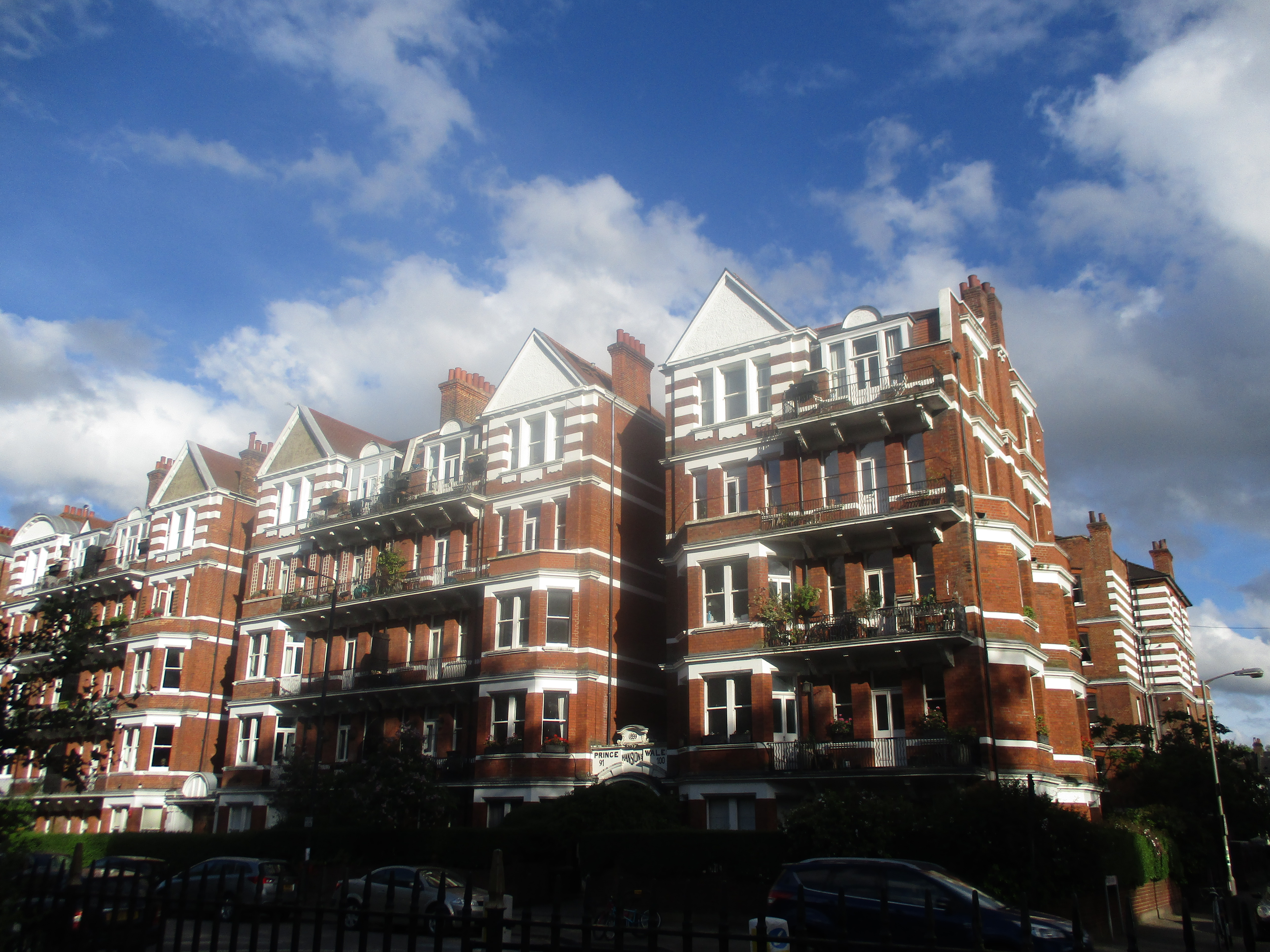
Prince of Wales Mansions

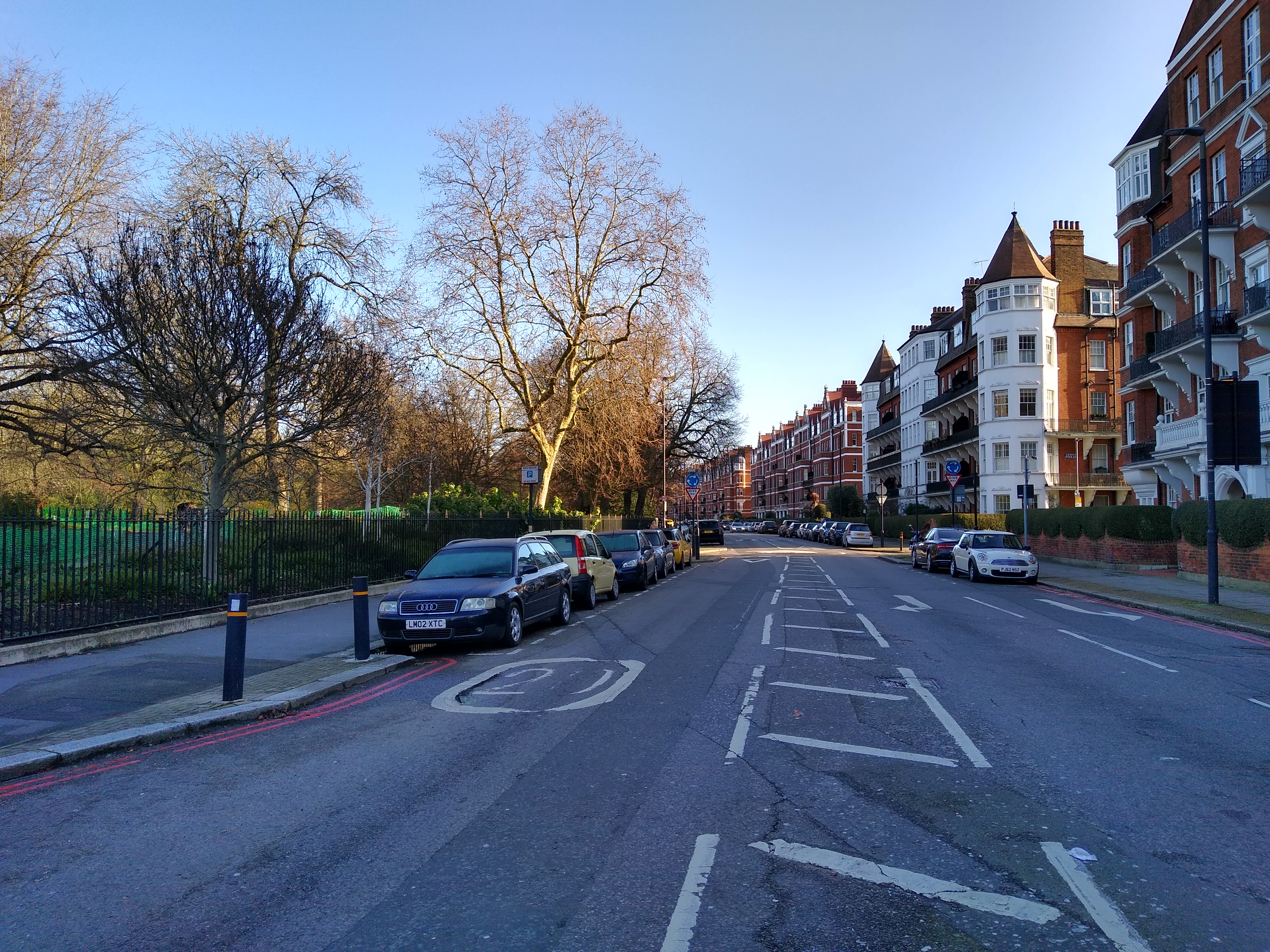
Prince of Wales Drive

The southern side of Prince of Wales Drive is lined with late-Victorian mansion blocks and villas. From Battersea Bridge Road, east to Queenstown Road, the building order is as follows:

1. Connaught Mansions
2. Park Mansions (started November 1894)
3. Norfolk Mansions (started October 1894)
4. Cyril Mansions (started April 1894)
5. Overstrand Mansions (started January 1893)
6. Carlton Lodge Villa (started 1884)
7. Primrose Mansions (started November 1894)
8. York Mansions (started 1897)
9. Prince of Wales Mansions
10. All Saints Court

== History ==
In 1846, the Commission for Improving the Metropolis acquired 320 acres of Battersea Fields, of which 198 acres became Battersea Park, and the remainder was to be let on building leases—the area now covered by Prince of Wales Drive, which was previously known as Prince of Wales Road, was part of Battersea Fields. The road was named after the then Prince of Wales, who would become King Edward VII in 1901; the roads on the east and west sides of the park were named after his mother and father respectively.

The original idea was for Battersea Park to be surrounded by middle-class villas, as seen in other contemporary parks in Britain. Land was allocated for building, but nothing was built for about 30 years. One villa, Carlton Lodge, was built in 1884.

In the 1890s Cyril Flower, 1st Baron Battersea, began to acquire vacant land on the south side of Prince of Wales Drive from the Commissioners for Development. His first mansion block to be developed along Prince of Wales Drive was Overstrand Mansions, which was begun on 11 January 1893. In 1894, most of the other mansion blocks were begun by Cyril Flower: Cyril Mansions was started on 26 April; Norfolk Mansions was started on 27 October; and both Sidestrand Mansions (now Park Mansions) and Primrose Mansions were started in November. These blocks were under construction, by different builders, at much of the same time, and are of an architecture style inspired by the Arts and Crafts Movement. The leases for these buildings were taken up with enthusiasm when built.

The names of these five mansion blocks were selected by Cyril Flower, and his wife Constance. Sidestrand Mansions (now Park Mansions), Norfolk Mansions and Overstrand Mansions were named after "Poppyland", which was popularised by Clement Scott, the theatre critic for The Daily Telegraph. "Poppyland" was a fashionable holiday destination during this time, and the names would have appealed to the first residents of Prince of Wales Drive. Cyril Mansions was named by Cyril Flower after himself, and Primrose Mansions was named after Constance's Rothschild cousin, Hannah, who was married to Archibald Primrose, Earl of Rosebery (Rosebery Villa abuts Primrose Mansions on Alexandra Road).

York Mansions and Prince of Wales Mansions were constructed a few years later, and were built on the reclaimed land from The Albert Palace.

The composer and musician Donald Swann lived for a while in Prince of Wales Drive, then Albert Bridge Road where a blue plaque has been placed.

== Events ==
In 1906, 69 Primrose Mansions was in the possession of Mrs Edith Karno, the estranged wife of comedy impresario Fred Karno. From here, with a number of Music Hall friends, she helped to run the first office of the Ladies Music Hall Guild—founded in September 1906 with Marie Lloyd as its president. Edith Karno was its first treasurer.

On Wednesday, 13 July 1910, Frederick Anderson and Elizabeth Earle heard two gunshots ring out from the neighboring garden flat, number 17 Prince of Wales Drive Mansions. Frederick, who was visiting Elizabeth, went to investigate, saw a body, and called the police. He recognised the body to be his father upon arrival of the police.

Frederick's father, Thomas Weldon Atherston, was an actor who went under the stage name of Weldon Atherston. Thomas had previously had an affair with Elizabeth Earle in 1899; she had been a young struggling actress when she had the affair. After the affair was over, Thomas' son, Frederick, and Elizabeth became friends.

The murder remains a mystery, and it is not known why Thomas Anderson was in the adjoining garden flat to Elizabeth Earle. Some surmise that he was spying on his son and ex-girlfriend.
