= Pump House Gallery =

Art gallery in Battersea Park, London

Coordinates: 51.4790°N 0.1548°W

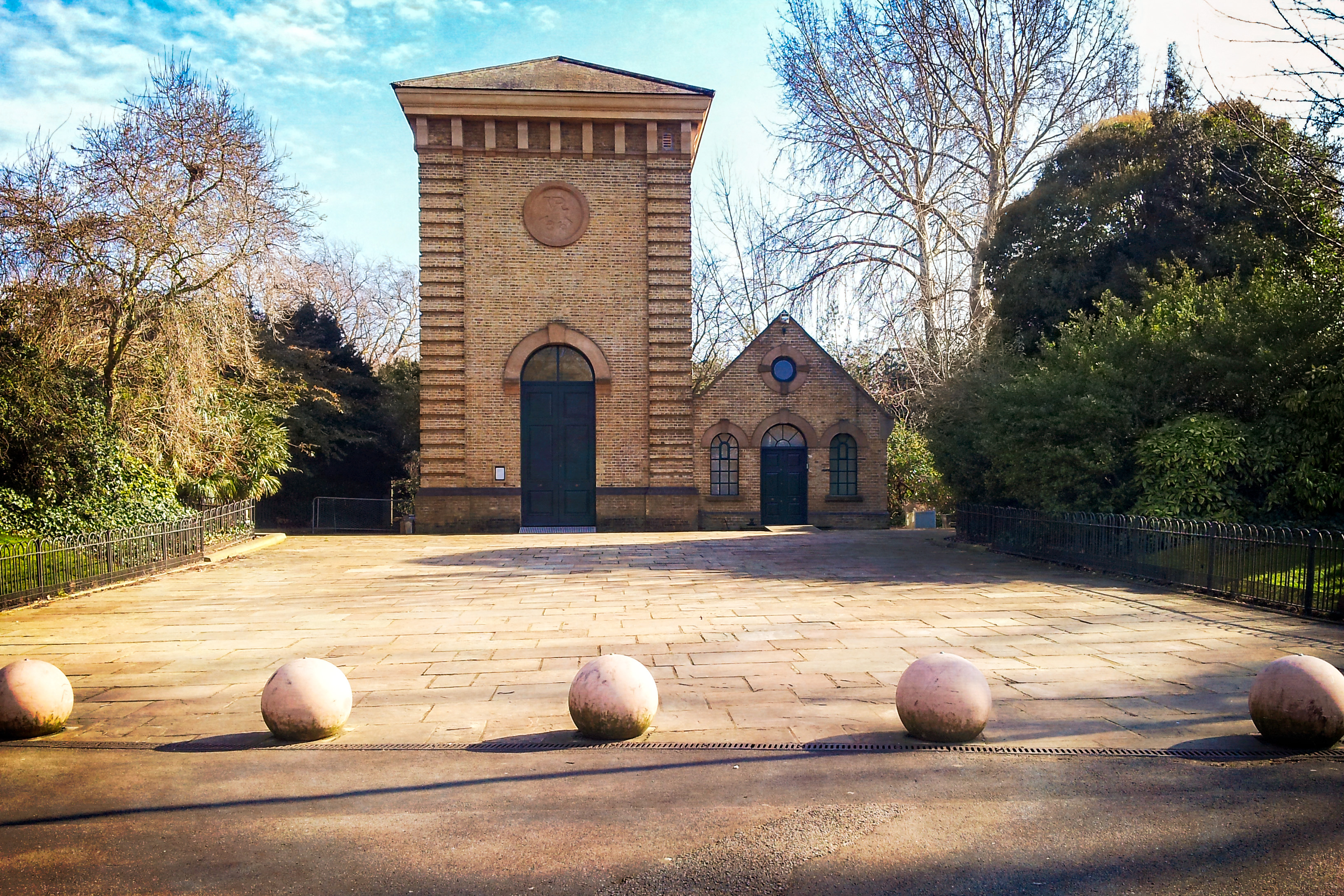
Pump House Gallery

Pump House Gallery is an art gallery in Battersea Park, London. It is both located in and owned and managed by the London Borough of Wandsworth. It is a former pump house for the adjacent boating lake, and is the only Grade II listed building in the park.

== Pump house ==
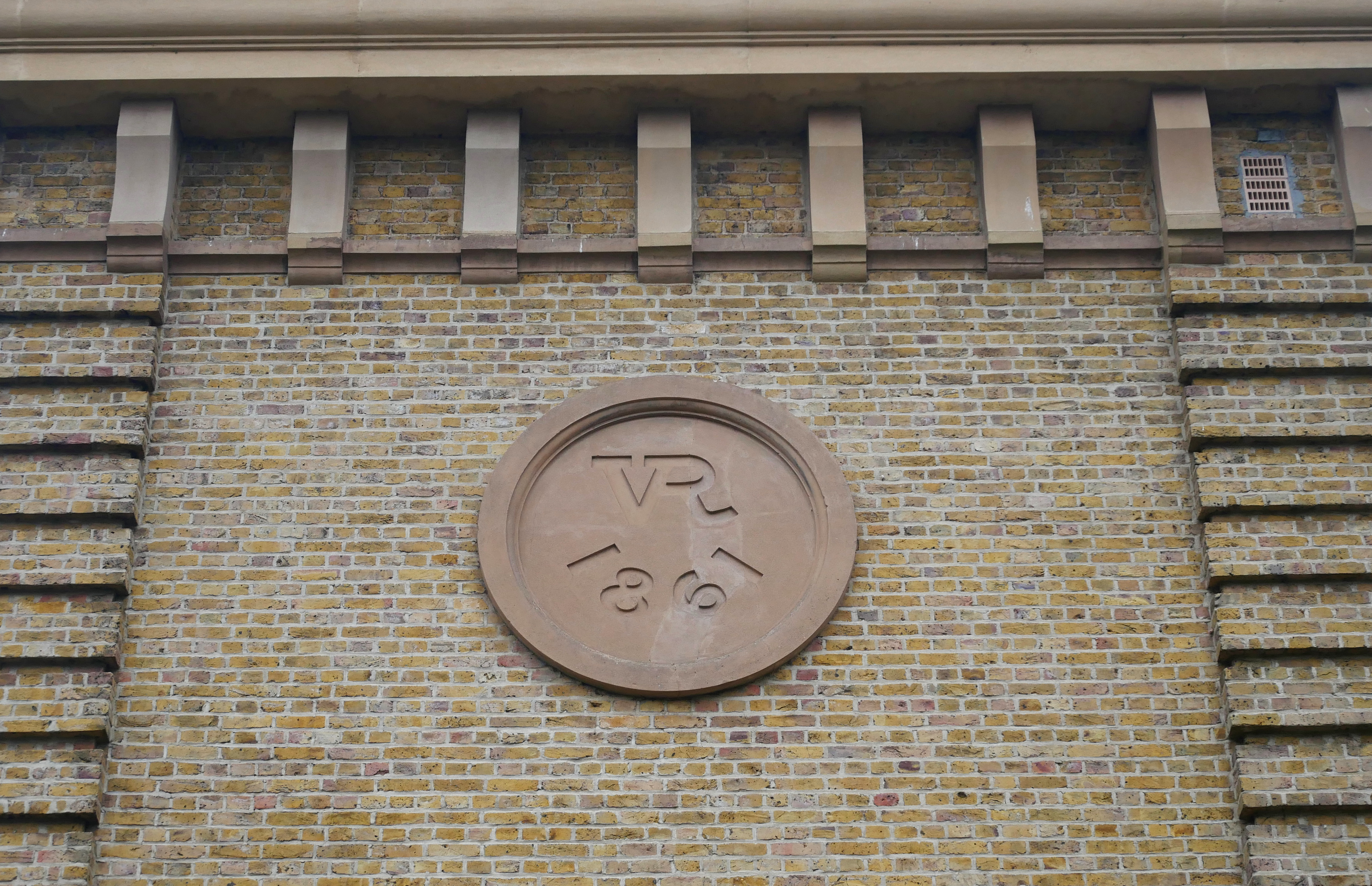
'VR 1861' roundel

The pump house was built in 1861 by James and William Simpson, in order to supply water to the 15-acre boating lake. The boating lake was a key feature of Battersea Park, designed in the 1850s by James Pennethorne. It is built of English bond brown brick with rusticated quoin strips and stucco dressings, and has a hipped Welsh slate roof. The front 4-storey bay has 'VR/1861' set in a stone roundel above a keyed stone semi-circular arched doorway.

Although there are other listed structures and features in the park, the pump house is the only listed building. It was restored in 1987–88, and is Grade II listed.

== Gallery ==
The gallery features contemporary art exhibitions, and includes a gift shop. The gallery features annual outdoor exhibitions.

The gallery is available for civil weddings.
