= Gill Bennett =

British historian and civil servant

Gill Bennett OBE

Academic background
- Education: Somerville College, Oxford

Academic work
- Discipline: Historian
- Sub-discipline: Diplomatic history, Political history
- Institutions: Foreign and Commonwealth Office

Gillian Bennett is a British historian and civil servant, previously the Chief Historian of the Foreign and Commonwealth Office between 1995 and 2005.

== Career ==
After graduating from Somerville College, University of Oxford in 1969, Bennett began her career in the Foreign Office in 1972 as a research assistant in what was then called the Historical Branch. She held a number of roles within the wider FCO, and in 1995 was appointed to the newly-created position of Chief Historian. In this role, she edited the documentary history of British foreign policy since 1945, Documents on British Policy Overseas, and give historical advice to ministers and officials.

In 1998, FCO historians were commissioned by Foreign Secretary Robin Cook to investigate the authenticity of the Zinoviev Letter, and Bennett authored the report of their findings, concluding that the letter was a forgery though not likely to have been directly the work of MI6 officers. In researching the origins of the letter, Bennett had full access to British government sources, and also drew upon Russian archival records. Bennett retired from the civil service in 2005, and was succeeded as chief historian by Patrick Salmon.

Since 2005, Bennett has published three monographs, Churchill's Man of Mystery: Desmond Morton and the World of Intelligence (2006), Six Moments of Crisis: Inside British Foreign Policy (2013), and The Zinoviev Letter: The Conspiracy that Never Dies (2018).

== Major publications ==
- Bennett, Gill (2006). Churchill's Man of Mystery: Desmond Morton and the World of Intelligence. Government Official History Series. doi:10.4324/9780203966785. ISBN 9780415394307.
- Bennett, Gill (2013). Six Moments of Crisis: Inside British Foreign Policy. Oxford University Press. ISBN 9780199583751.
- Bennett, Gill (2018). The Zinoviev Letter: The Conspiracy that Never Dies. Oxford University Press. ISBN 9780198767305.

Government offices
Preceded by Heather Yasamee as Head of Historical Branch, Foreign and Commonwealth Office	Chief Historian, Foreign and Commonwealth Office; 1995–2005	Succeeded by Patrick Salmon
