= Walk of Fame (dogs) =

The Walk of Fame is a tribute to famous dogs in London, England. The initial six inductees were announced on November 5, 2007. The honors were sponsored by The Kennel Club and television channel Sky Movies. Announcing the proposed tribute, Kennel Club Secretary Caroline Kisko said, "To immortalize these dogs within Battersea Park, a place intrinsically linked to dogs itself, is very important to the Kennel Club and promotes the importance of dogs within our lives".

Some of the honored dogs included Lassie, Toto from The Wizard of Oz, Bullseye from Oliver!, and Fang from the Harry Potter film series. Breeds representing each of the dogs attended the tribute. For Fang from Harry Potter, one of their siblings, called Leo, attended the event.

== Location ==
Permanent plaques for each inductee were placed in Battersea Park in London, which is on the south bank of the River Thames. The former Battersea Dogs Home, now called the Battersea Dog and Cats Home, Britain's largest home for abandoned dogs is situated nearby and a well-known landmark.

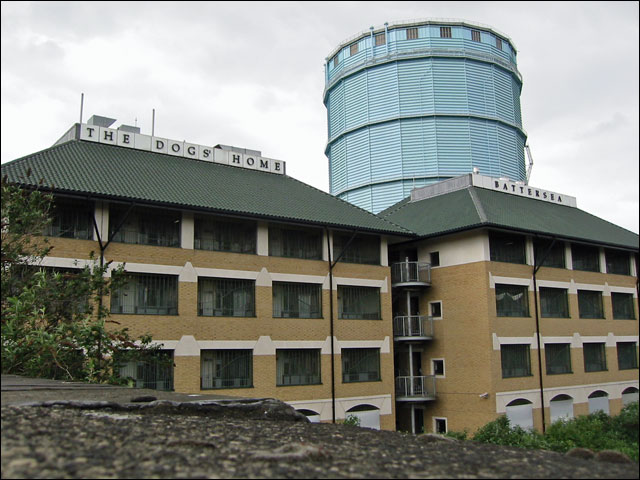
Battersea Dogs Home in 2004.

== Judging panel ==
Ian Lewis, Director of Sky Movies; Sarah Wright, Editor of Your Dog; James Christopher, Film Critic from The Times; and Caroline Kisko, Kennel Club Secretary are among the panel.
