= Battersea Park =

Green space in London, United Kingdom

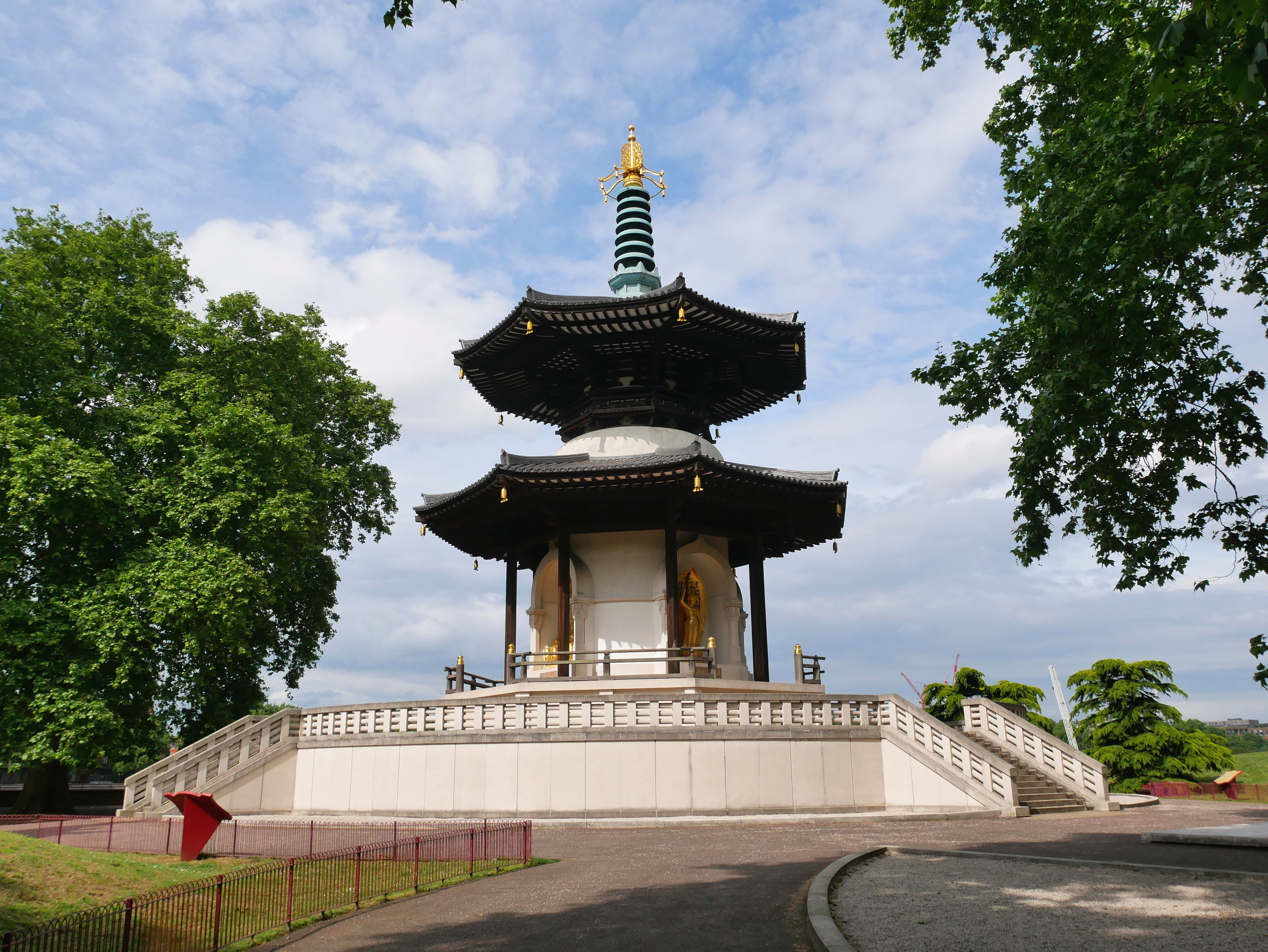

- Location within Greater London
- Location: Battersea; London, SW11; United Kingdom
- Coordinates: 51°28′45″N 0°09′26″W
- Area: 200 acres (81 ha) (0.8 km²)
- Created: 1858
- Operator: Wandsworth Council
- Public transit: Battersea Park, Queenstown Road (Battersea)

Battersea Park is a 200-acre (83-hectare) green space at Battersea in the London Borough of Wandsworth in London. It is situated on the south bank of the River Thames opposite Chelsea and was opened in 1858.

The park occupies marshland reclaimed from the Thames and land formerly used for market gardens. The park is Grade II* listed on the Register of Historic Parks and Gardens.

== History ==
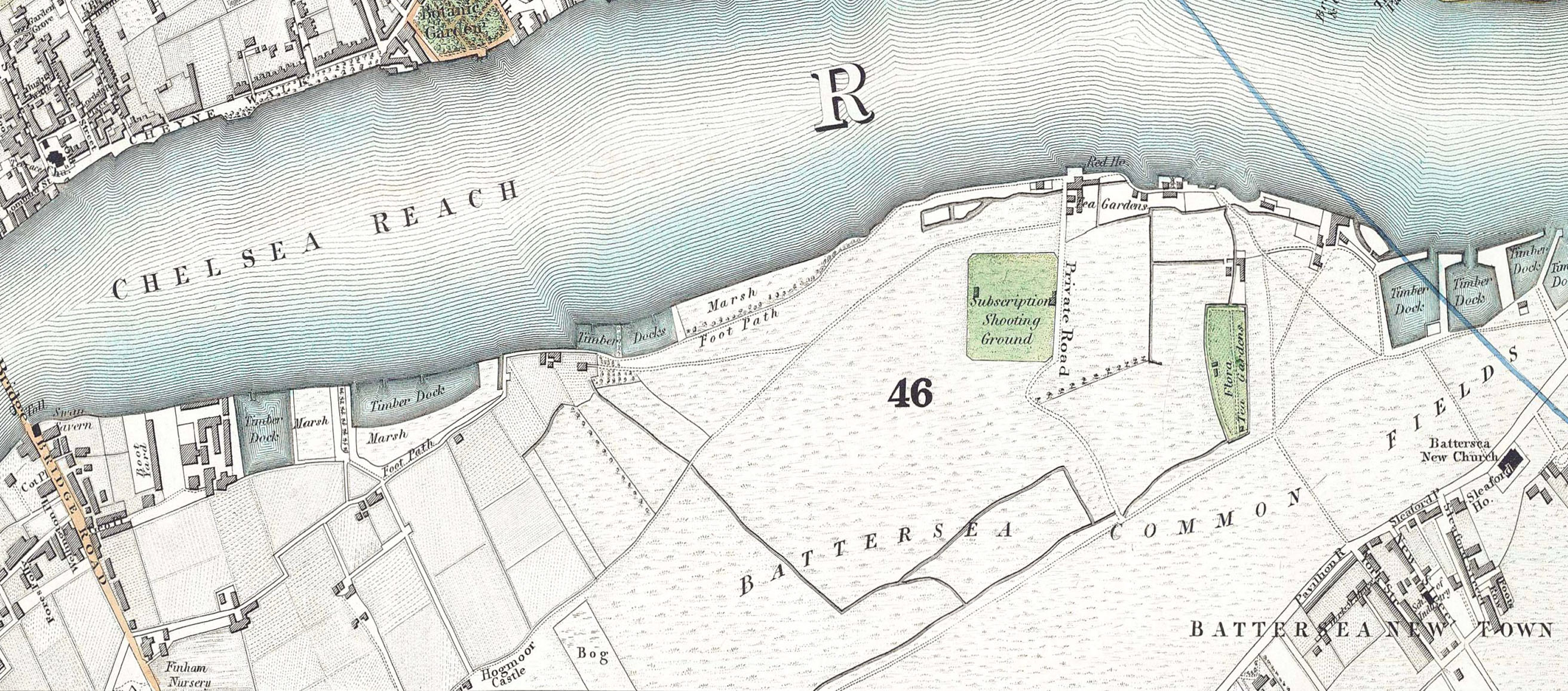
Battersea Common Fields shown on a map published in 1830

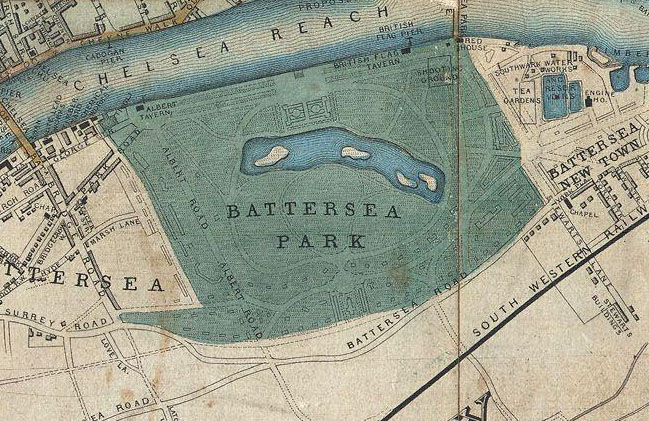
Battersea Park shown on a map published in 1852

Prior to 1846, the area now covered by the park was known as Battersea fields, a popular spot for duelling. On 21 March 1829, the Wellington–Winchilsea duel took place when the prime minister Duke of Wellington and the Earl of Winchilsea met on Battersea fields to settle a matter of honour. When it came time to fire, the duke aimed his duelling pistol wide and Winchilsea fired his into the air. Winchilsea later wrote the duke a groveling apology.

Separated from the river by a narrow raised causeway, the fields consisted of low, fertile marshes intersected by streams and ditches with the chief crops being carrots, melons, lavender (all the way up to Lavender Hill) and the famous 'Battersea Bunches' of asparagus.

Running along the riverside from the fields were industrial concerns and wharves, including a pottery, copper works, lime kiln, chemical works, and, increasingly, railways. The site of Battersea Power Station was partly occupied by the famously bawdy Red House Tavern, patronised by Charles Dickens. Access was via the rickety wooden Battersea Bridge or by ferry from the Chelsea bank.

Battersea Park Act 1846
- Act of Parliament
- Parliament of the United Kingdom
- Long title: An Act to empower the Commissioners of Her Majesty's Woods to form a Royal Park in Battersea Fields in the County of Surrey.
- Citation: 9 & 10 Vict. c. 38
- Territorial extent: United Kingdom

Dates
- Royal assent: 3 August 1846
- Commencement: 3 August 1846 (Note: The Acts of Parliament (Commencement) Act 1793.)
Other legislation
Amended by	Battersea Park Act 1851

Status: Amended

Text of statute as originally enacted

In 1845, spurred partly by the local vicar and partly by Thomas Cubitt, the builder and developer, whose yards were across the river in the still marshy and undeveloped area of Pimlico, a bill was submitted to Parliament to form a royal park of 320 acres. The Battersea Park Act 1846 (9 & 10 Vict. c. 38) was passed in 1846 and £200,000 was promised for the purchase of the land. The Commission for Improving the Metropolis acquired 320 acres of Battersea fields, of which 198 acres became Battersea Park, opened in 1858, and the remainder was let on building leases.

The park was laid out by Sir James Pennethorne between 1846 and 1864, although the park which was opened in 1858 varied somewhat from Pennethorne's vision.

The park's success depended on the successful completion of the Chelsea Bridge, declared open in 1858 by Queen Victoria. In her honour, the road alongside the eastern edge of the park was called Victoria Road, linked to Queens Road by Victoria Circus (now Queen's Circus). Victoria Road and Queens Road later became Queenstown Road. Prince of Wales Road (now Prince of Wales Drive) was laid out along the southern boundary and Albert Bridge Road constructed along the western side. The park came under the management of the newly formed London County Council in 1889.

The park hosted the first exhibition football game played under the rules of the recently formed Football Association on 9 January 1864. The members of the teams were chosen by the President of the FA (A. Pember) and the Secretary (E. C. Morley) and included many well-known footballers of the day.

From the 1860s, the park was home to the leading amateur football team Wanderers F.C., winners of the first FA Cup, in 1872. The park also hosted the historic London v Sheffield football match in March 1866.

In 1924, the 24th Division War Memorial by Eric Kennington was unveiled by Field Marshal Lord Plumer and the Anglican Bishop of Southwark Cyril Garbett. It commemorates the over 10,000 men killed or listed as "missing presumed dead" whilst serving with the British Army's 24th Division. It is now Grade II* listed.

During both wars, anti-aircraft guns and barrage balloons were installed to help protect London from enemy air raids. Shelters were dug, part of the park was turned over to allotments for much needed vegetables and a pig farm was also set up. Maintenance of the park was reduced as the war effort took priority.

On 16 September 1978, Battersea Park hosted a punk rock concert featuring The Stranglers and several guests, among them Peter Gabriel and The Skids. "The Stranglers booked some strippers to up the show's visual aspect," recalled photographer Barry Plummer. "But some of the lads in the audience got a bit carried away and also stripped completely naked. Eventually the police were called and took down all of the young ladies' particulars."

British artist Marion Coutts recreated Battersea, along with Regent's and Hyde Park as a set of asymmetrical ping-pong tables for her interactive installation Fresh Air (1998–2001).

The 1996 film 101 Dalmatians was filmed at Battersea Park; it stands in for St James Park.

In 2015 and 2016, Battersea Park hosted the London ePrix, a round of the FIA Formula E World Championship. The Battersea Park Street Circuit was a 2.925km (1.818 mi) track constructed around the park with 17 corners, including tight chicanes and hairpins. Eventually, the FIA removed it from the championship calendar in 2016 due to opposition from local residents and legal pressures.

== The Festival Gardens ==
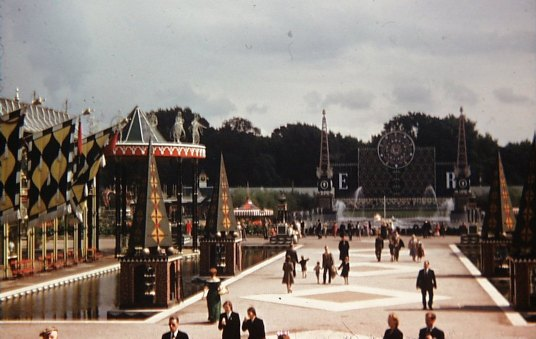
The Festival Gardens

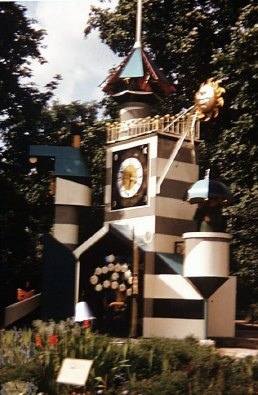
The Guinness Clock

In 1951 the northern parts of the park were transformed into the "Pleasure Gardens" as part of the Festival of Britain celebrations. As well as a new water-garden and fountains, new features included a "Tree-Walk", which consisted of a series of raised wooden walkways linked by tree house-like platforms suspended between the branches of a number of trees.

Popular attractions included the Guinness Clock, designed by Jan Le Witt and George Him, and the Far Tottering and Oyster Creek Branch Railway.

The Festival Pleasure Gardens Act 1952, an act of the Parliament of the United Kingdom, enabled the gardens to continue for a limited time after the end of the festival.

== Battersea Funfair ==
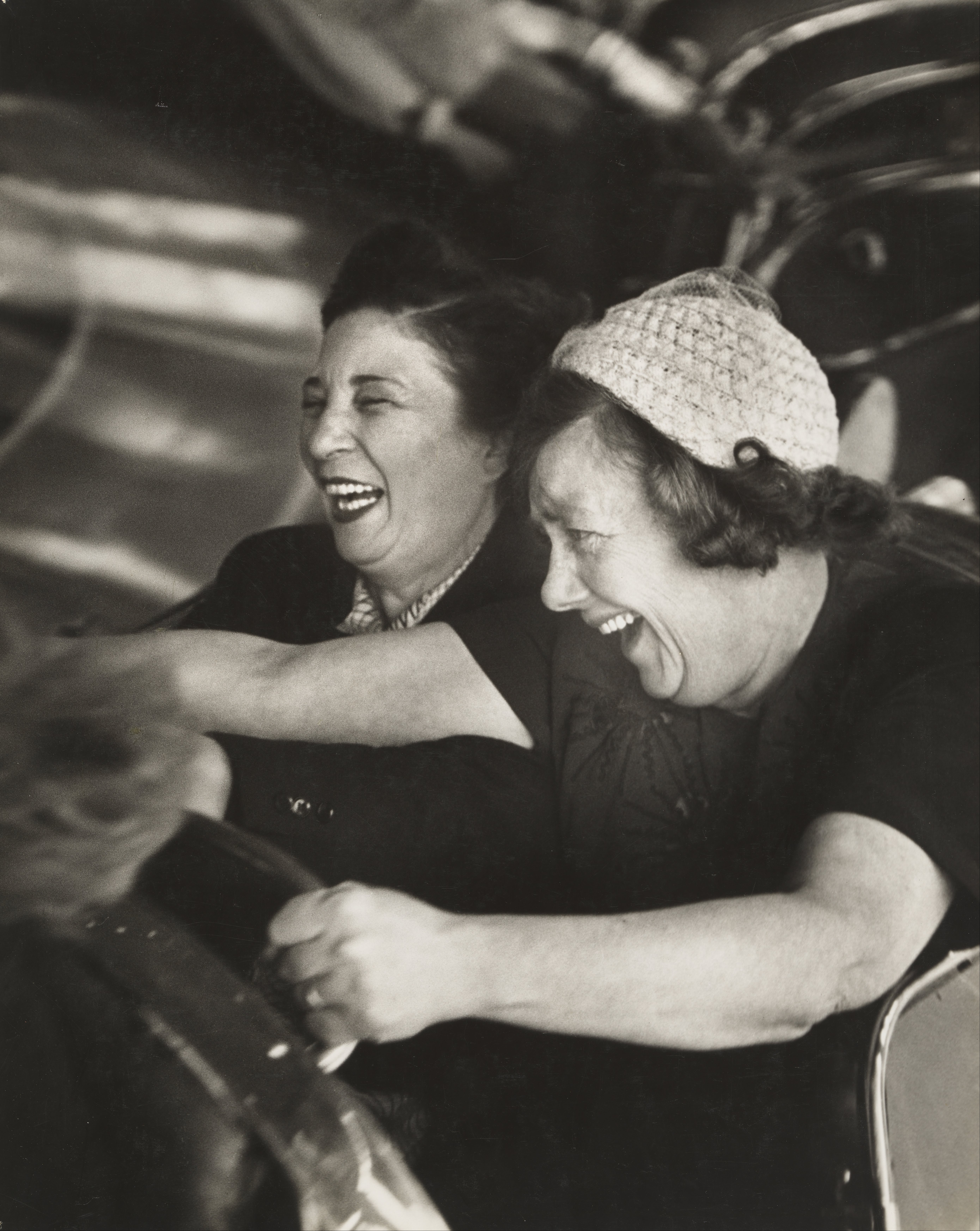
David Moore Battersea Fun Fair, London (1951)

Another part of the transformation was the addition of Battersea Funfair, with roller coasters, swings, roundabouts and other attractions.

The funfair's leading attraction was the roller coaster ride, known as The Big Dipper, which opened in 1951. It was of wooden construction and suffered a major fire in 1970. It was closed after five children were killed and 13 injured in the Battersea Park funfair disaster on 30 May 1972 when one of the trains became detached from the haulage rope, rolling back to the station (the anti-rollback mechanism having failed) and colliding with the other train.

After the closure, the "Jetstream" ride was sold to Trusthouse Forte, the then owners of Belle Vue Zoological Gardens in Manchester. A night scene at the funfair, which was ghostly and empty, featured in the opening title scene for the 1960s television series Journey to the Unknown. The site of the funfair was levelled and became a site for travelling fairs and exhibitions, and is the site of Battersea Evolution, formerly the Battersea Park Events Arena, which hosts exhibitions, conferences and Christmas parties.

== Current features in the park ==
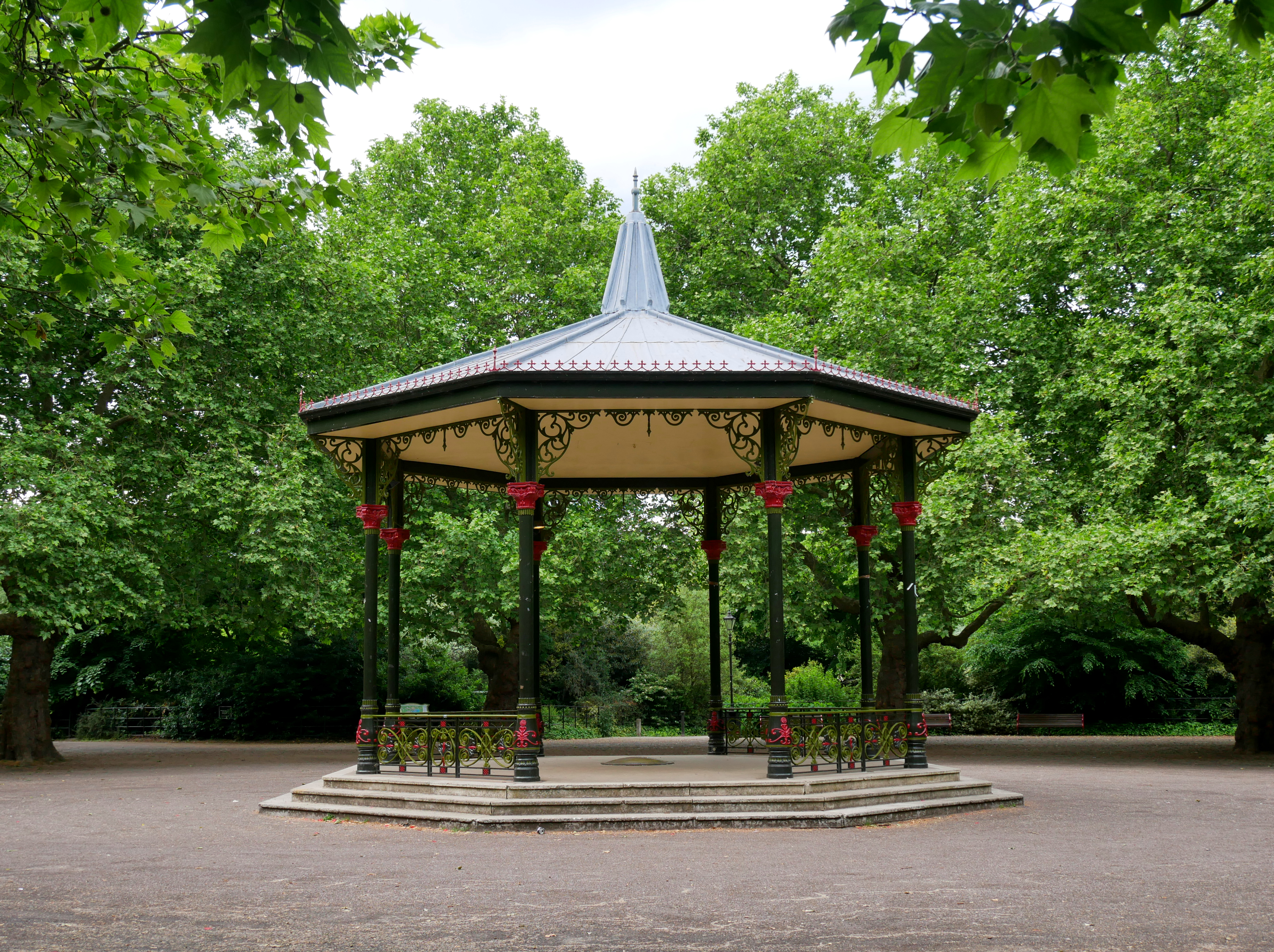
The bandstand in Battersea Park

The park is home to a small children's zoo, a boating lake, a bandstand, and all-weather outdoor sporting facilities including tennis courts, a running track and football pitches. Four West London hockey teams use the all-weather Astroturf pitches, including the Wanderers Hockey Club.

In the centre of the park is Pump House Gallery, which is housed in a four-storey Grade II listed Victorian tower. It is owned by Wandsworth Council

On the western side there are two cricket pitches, home to the King's Road Cricket & Social Club. The club, whose members wear distinctive orange caps, can be seen playing at weekends.

The park is the site of the London Peace Pagoda, erected in 1985. A Buddhist monk, the Reverend Gyoro Nagase, looks after the pagoda on a daily basis, and lives in a converted storage room behind the pagoda. A replica of the bronze statue of a dog that was the focal point of the historic vivisection-related Brown Dog affair was erected here in 1985. It was moved in 1994 to the Woodland Walk, near the Old English Garden.

In 2002–4 the park underwent a £11 million refurbishment funded in part by the Heritage Lottery Fund and was re-opened on 2 June 2004 by Prince Philip.

In 2007, a Dog Walk of Fame was inaugurated in the park.

The Winter Garden, next to Albert Bridge Road, was commissioned by the Friends of Battersea Park and designed by Dan Pearson Studios. It was opened by Mayor Boris Johnson on 3 March 2011, at which he unveiled a plaque designed by Steve Bunn of the RCA Sculpture School.

In 1871, James Robert Pulham constructed "Waterfalls, Rocky stream, [and a] Cave for shady seat on the peninsula and in other parts of the Park" in his patented anthropic rock Pulhamite. It was the first example of this unique rock landscape in a London Park. The waterfalls have not been running into the lake since the 1980s due to natural degradation and difficulties with providing energy to the pumps.

In 2011, a sculpture commemorating the 10th anniversary of the 9/11 terror attacks, After 9/11, was unveiled by the Mayor of London, Boris Johnson.

In 2012, the park hosted one of the seven national Foodies Festivals on 17–19 August. Masterclasses were performed by chefs such as Levi Roots and Ed Baines, with burlesque shows, restaurant tents, city beaches and pop-up cinemas.

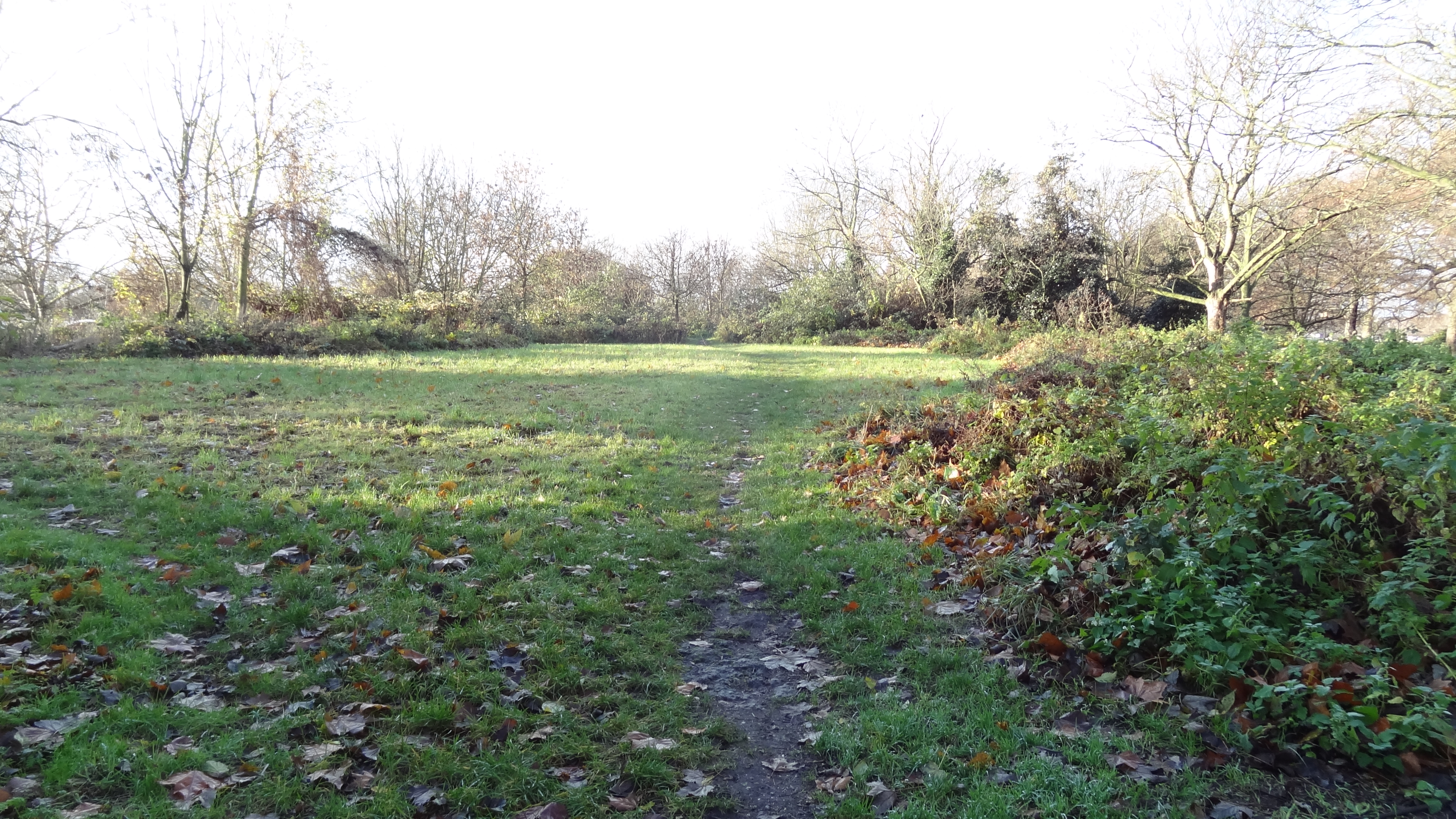
Battersea Park Nature Area

== Battersea Park Nature Areas ==
A narrow strip along the eastern edge of the park and two smaller nearby areas have been designated the Battersea Park Nature Areas Local Nature Reserve, with an area of three hectares. They have a variety of woodland bird species including blackcap and bullfinch. There are 20 species of butterfly and several of stag beetle. Other invertebrate species include the hoverfly Volucella zonaria.

== Nearby railway and underground stations ==
- Battersea Park railway station
- Queenstown Road railway station
- Battersea Power Station tube station
