= Patrick Salmon =

Patrick Salmon (born 1952) is a historian of diplomatic history with a focus on Scandinavia.

He is a chief historian at the Foreign and Commonwealth Office and a visiting professor at Newcastle University. In 2001, he was a fellow at the Norwegian Nobel Institute. He is a member of the Norwegian Academy of Science and Letters.

== Bibliography ==
Scandinavia and the Great Powers 1890–1940 (Cambridge University Press, 1997).

"Norway", in Neville Wylie (Editor), European Neutrals and Non-Belligerents During the Second World War (Cambridge University Press, 2002).

The Baltic Nations and Europe: Estonia, Latvia and Lithuania in the 20th century, eds. John Hiden and Patrick Salmon (Routledge, 2014).
