= Jan Le Witt =

Polish-born British abstract artist, graphic designer and illustrator

- Born: Abraham Lewitt; 3 April 1907; Częstochowa, Poland
- Died: 21 January 1991 (aged 83); Cambridge, England
- Known for: Painting, drawing, printmaking, ceramics, stage design, writing
- Movement: Abstract art, Graphic design

Jan Le Witt (1907–1991) was a Polish-born British abstract artist, graphic designer and illustrator. He had a long professional partnership with George Him. As a design company, Lewitt-Him brought an innovative use of colour, abstraction and symbolism to commercial design. They established a reputation for fine poster work during World War Two and for exhibition displays, most notably with the Guinness clock for the Festival of Britain. The partnership dissolved in 1955 when Le Witt decided to concentrate upon his own, often abstract, art.

== Biography ==
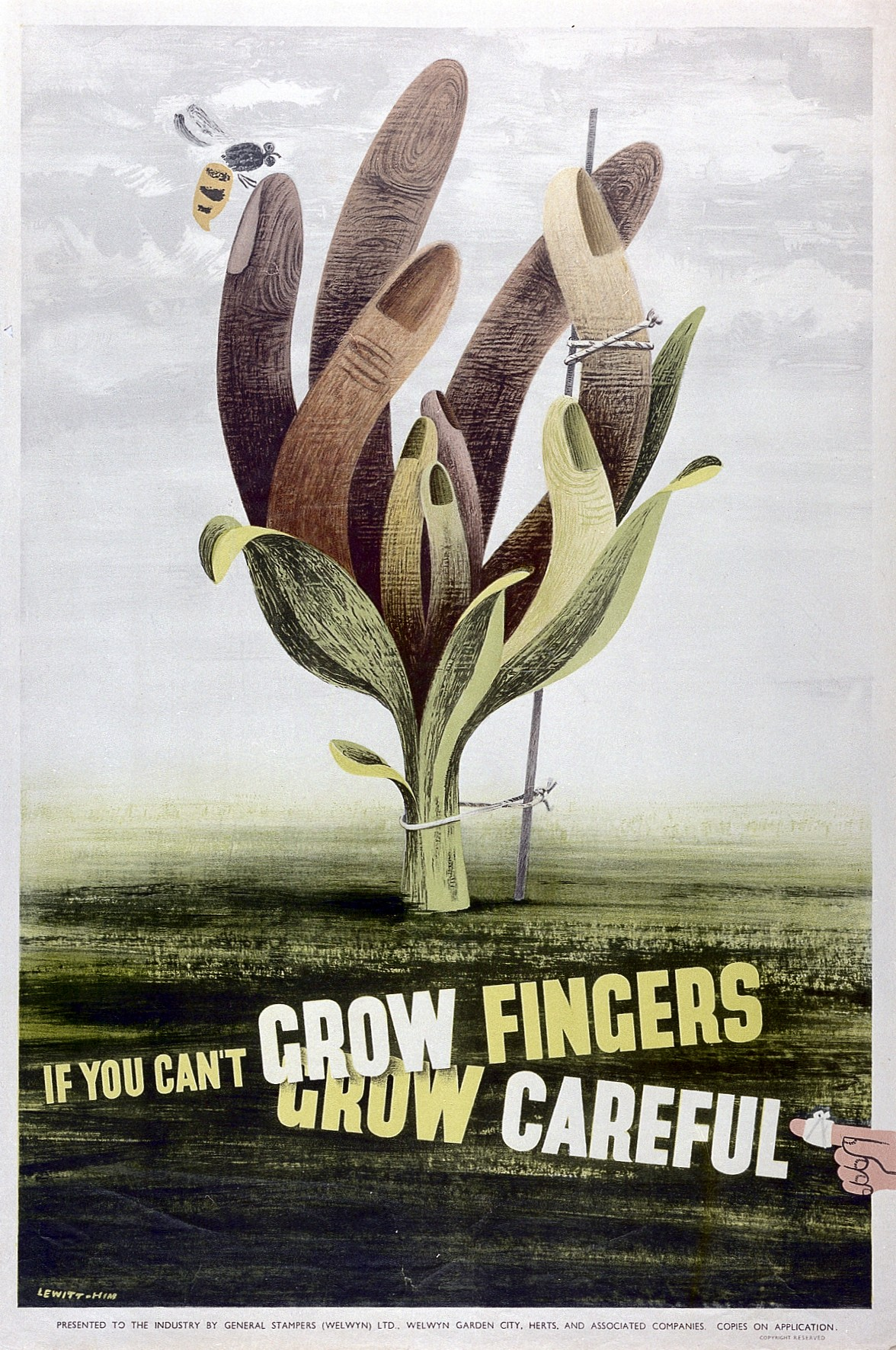
A Lewitt-Him safety poster from General Stampers – a machine tool factory in Welwyn Garden City

Le Witt came from a Jewish family and after leaving school in Częstochowa he spent over three years travelling in Europe and the Middle East. In 1929, he designed the first Hebrew font "Chaim" which corresponded to the Latin fonts.

In 1930, he presented his work in a solo exhibition in Warsaw.

In 1933, he met the graphic artist George Him in a Warsaw café and began a working partnership, which lasted until 1955. Their characteristic style evolved from 'blending surrealist and cubist tendencies with whimsical humour.' Him wrote of their meeting, 'when I met Lewitt ... we discovered that we had almost identical views on graphic design. We were both perfectionists. We also discovered that instead of showering each other with compliments, we could together achieve a much higher level. Although over the years we never quit arguing, the results seem to suggest that ultimately, in this we were not mistaken.' In the mid-1930s, the partners were commissioned by Przeworski publishers to design illustrations for three poems that had been written for children by the Polish poet and satiricist, Julian Tuwim. The poems, Lokomotywa (The Locomotive), Rzepka (The Little Turnip) and Ptasie Radio (The Birds' Broadcast), were put into a single book entitled Lokomotywa, (1937) which was later published in English, German and French.

Le Witt emigrated to London in 1937 and was naturalised 10 years later. Work produced by the partnership in Poland had been reproduced in foreign publications, such as Gebrauchsgraphik and Arts et Métiers Graphiques, and caught the attention of Philip James of the Victoria and Albert Museum in London and the directors of the Lund Humphries publishing company. The two organisations sponsored the partners' move to London; the Victoria & Albert Museum prepared their immigration forms and Lund Humphries put on an exhibition of their graphic work. Upon establishing themselves in London, the Lewitt-Him partnership designed advertising posters for London Transport and Imperial Airways. During World War II, the pair created posters for, amongst others, the Ministry of Information, the General Post Office and the Ministry of Food. They also designed murals for war factory canteens and posters and books for the Polish government in exile and for the Dutch government in exile. They also designed the Guinness Festival clock for the Festival of Britain, held in Battersea Park. Le Witt gained British citizenship in 1947. He was also a fire warden for Kensington and Chelsea; the London borough in which he lived.

While living in London Le Witt became good friends with a circle of artists including Henry Moore, Piero Fornasetti and David Zwemmer, and met and worked with Pablo Picasso on a number of occasions. He also formed a strong friendship with Sir Herbert Read, who wrote the foreword to his monograph and was one of the first critics to recognise his worth as a painter of abstracts based on naturalistic forms. Le Witt married Alina Prusicka in 1939 in London after she also fled Poland before the Second World War. She was the author of many of the children's books that he illustrated. They had one son, Michael Le Witt in 1945.

In 1955 Lewitt-Him dissolved as Le Witt wanted to focus on his artistic work as a painter and individual artist. Among many projects, he designed sets and costumes for ballets in Sadler's Wells (1942), most notably the decor and costumes for the Cranko Ballet, Morceaux Enfantin. He also worked in other media such as glass sculpture in Murano and tapestries for Tabard at Aubusson. He had individual and group exhibitions all over Europe and the USA. In Britain he exhibited at the Grosvenor Gallery, the Zwemmer Gallery (1947 and 1953) and Tate Britain (1950 and 1952), the Fitzwilliam Museum in Cambridge (1989). Elsewhere, he exhibited at the Musee Grimaldi in Antibes, the Piazza San Marco in Venice and at MOMA in New York.

== Book illustrations ==
- Julian Tuwim, 'Lokomotywa' (with George Him, 1934)
- Jan Lewitt and George Him, 'The Football's Revolt' (1939)
- Diana Ross, 'The Little Red Engine Gets a Name' (with George Him, 1942)
- Alina Le Witt, 'Blue Peter' (1943)
- Alina Le Witt, 'Five Silly Cats' (with George Him, 1945)
- Jan Le Witt, 'The Vegetabull' (1956)

== Literature and sources ==
- Read, Herbert Edward, Jean Cassou and John Smith: Jan Le Witt, Routledge & Kegan Paul: New York, 1971
- Documenta III. International Exhibition; Catalog: Volume 1: Painting and sculpture; Volume 2: Hand drawings; Industrial design, graphics; Kassel/Cologne, 1964
- Mackay, Bertha E .: Illustrators of Children's Books 1744–1945, Boston 1947, reprint 1961
- Warda, Michał in Very Graphic – Polish Designers of the 20th Century, edited by Jacek Mrowczyk, Adam Mickiewicz Institute, 2015, pp. 104–111.
- Gryglewicz, T., Groteska w sztuce polskiej XX wieku, Kraków, 1984, pp. 137–138.
- Hölscher, E., ‘Lewitt-Him, Warschau’, International Advertising Art, 1936, No. 7.
- Ostrowski, H. L., ‘Reklama firm chemiczno-farmaceutycznych’, Reklama 1931, No. 6
- Gasser, Manuel, Graphis, No.14, 1946, p. 203.
- Elvin, René, in Art and Industry, October 1956, p. 120.
- ‘Lewitt-Him’ in Graphis No. 14, 18, 22, 31, 37, 42, 48.
- Gebrauchs Grafik, July 1936 and No. 5, 1953.
- Tomrley, C.G., ‘Lewitt-Him’ in Graphis No. 48, 1953, pp. 268–275.
- Hollis, R., Graphic Design: A Concise History, London, 2001, pp. 176–177.
