= Gnomon (disambiguation) =

A gnomon is the part of a sundial that casts the shadow.

Gnomon may also refer to:

- Gnomon (figure), in geometry, a plane figure formed by removing a similar parallelogram from a corner of a larger parallelogram
- Gnomon (journal), a German language academic journal of classics
- Gnomon (novel), a science fiction novel by Nick Harkaway
- Gnomon, the difference between a pair of consecutive figurate numbers
- Gnomon, one of the twenty-five fictional islands in the fantasy book series The Books of Abarat
- Gnomon School of Visual Effects, a Hollywood-based university
- Gnomon, a proposed 1,000 megaton nuclear weapon conceived alongside Sundial.
- The proper name of the star WASP-43

== See also ==
- Gnomonic projection
