= Simon Cornwell =

Co-chief executive of The Ink Factory

Simon Cornwell (born 7 March 1957) is co-chief executive of The Ink Factory together with his brother Stephen Cornwell. They are two of the four sons of the British spy David Cornwell, better known under his pen name John le Carré. The company oversees dramatic adaptations of le Carré's novels for the screen and stage.

== Early life ==
Simon Anthony Vivian Cornwell was born on 7 March 1957 in Somerset, England, to Ann Martin and David Cornwell, who had met as teenagers. Simon is the oldest of their three sons, the other two being Stephen, his co-CEO of The Ink Factory, and the journalist Tim Cornwell (1962-2022). The couple divorced in 1971 and in 1972 David married his literary agent Jane Eustace and had his fourth son with her, the novelist Nick Harkaway.

Growing up, Cornwell traveled around Europe before settling in Crete, a Greek island, where his father pursued a career as a writer. He then attended the small Frilsham preparatory school in Berkshire (closed in 1968) before going on to the prestigious Westminster School in London.

Cornwell attended the University of Oxford, where he studied modern languages. He later worked on the Thai-Laos-Cambodia border for the International Rescue Committee. He helped build Khao-I-Dang, a temporary refugee camp. He also studied management at the University of Yale in the United States.

== Career ==
Among the le Carré works that Cornwell has shepherded to the television is the novel The Night Manager, as both English and Hindi-language television series.

His latest producing work is The Little Drummer Girl miniseries, which is based on le Carré's novel of the same name, starring Florence Pugh and Alexander Skarsgård, and directed by Park Chan-wook.

He also executive produced an upcoming series entitled Legacy of Spies, of which the first season will be based on le Carré's 1963 novel The Spy Who Came in From the Cold while also drawing on material from his 2017 novel A Legacy of Spies. His brother Stephen Cornwell and Clarrisa Ingram serve as writers, and Michael Lennox and Claudia Llosa serve as directors of the series.

Prior to serving as Co-CEO of The Ink Factory, Cornwell worked at Boston Consulting Group, developed a company that combined live games with television, and worked as a venture capitalist at Amadeus Capital.

== Filmography ==
=== Film ===
Key
†	Denotes films that have not yet been released

Year	Title	Producer	Notes
2014	A Most Wanted Man	Yes	
2016	Our Kind of Traitor	Yes	
2016	Message from the King	Yes	
2016	Billy Lynn's Long Halftime Walk	Associate	
2018	Hotel Artemis	Yes	
2023	The Pigeon Tunnel	Yes	
TBA	Gold Mountain †	Yes	

=== Television ===
Key
†	Denotes television productions that have not yet been released

Year	Title	Executive producer	Network(s)	Notes
2016–present	The Night Manager	Yes	BBC (United Kingdom); AMC (United States; series 1); Amazon Prime Video (Worldwide (Note: Excluding the United Kingdom); series 2)	British series
2018	The Little Drummer Girl	Yes	BBC (United Kingdom); AMC (United States)	
2023	The Night Manager	Yes	Disney+ Hotstar (India)	Indian series
TBA	Legacy of Spies †	Yes	BBC (United Kingdom); MGM+ (United States)	
