= Anne Griffiths =

British librarian and archivist (1932–2017)

Dame Elizabeth Anne Griffiths DCVO (née Stevenson; 2 November 1932 – 3 March 2017) was a British librarian and archivist. She served as the personal archivist of Prince Philip, Duke of Edinburgh.

== Early life and education ==
Elizabeth Anne Stevenson was born on 2 November 1932 in Harrow on the Hill, London, as the oldest of four children. Her father was William Hugh Stevenson (1897–1972), who was a house master at Harrow School and a former international rugby player. Her mother was Elizabeth Margaret Wallace (1902–1985). One of her brothers is the investment banker Sir Hugh Stevenson. From the age of 13, she was educated at St Leonards School, a boarding school in St Andrews, Scotland. She then trained at Mrs Hoster's Secretarial College in London.

== Career ==
In 1952, at the age of 19, Griffiths began working as a lady clerk in the Office of the Duke of Edinburgh. Her initial appointment was temporary, and was expected to end after the coronation of Queen Elizabeth II, but the high quality of her work led to a full-time position. In the course of her role, Griffiths became one of the first two British women to cross the Antarctic Circle, when she joined Prince Philip aboard the royal yacht to travel to the 1956 Melbourne Olympic Games.

She left Philip's office in 1960, when she married David Griffiths, and was appointed Member of the Royal Victorian Order (MVO) in recognition of her service. Griffiths returned to work at Buckingham Palace in 1983 after her husband's death. She served as a librarian and archivist until 2017. She worked in an office next to Philip's drawing room. Her role included cataloguing his collection of books and papers, conducting research for his speeches, answering enquiries, and liaising with journalists.

Her service was recognised with a number of honours: in the Royal Victorian Order, she was promoted to lieutenant (LVO) in 1988 and commander (CVO) in 1995, and finally made a dame commander (DCVO) in 2005. In 2011, she was one of the few non-royal guests invited to Windsor Castle for Philip's 90th birthday lunch. She continued working until a month before her death in 2017.

== Personal life ==
She married David Latimer Griffiths on 22 September 1960. During their marriage they lived in Bulawayo, Zimbabwe, and in Australia. They had five children: Peter, Edward, Sarah, Michael and Caroline. Anne and David remained married until David's death in 1983. Caroline died in 1986.

Griffiths had interests in several sports. She supported Arsenal, and was a season ticket holder for many years. She also enjoyed watching rugby, cricket, golf and tennis.

Griffiths was a Christian and was actively involved in her local church, St Mark's Regents Park, where she served as a churchwarden. She was also a supporter of the Royal British Legion.

== Death and memorials ==
Griffiths died on 3 March 2017, at the age of 84, from duodenal cancer. Her memorial service was held at St Mark's Regents Park in May, and was attended by Philip as one of his final public appearances before his retirement.

A stained glass window was installed in her memory in St Mark's Church in 2018. The window was created by Graham Jones and depicts a flying dove, on a background of green, blue and red.
