= Message from the King (film) =

- Promotional poster
- Directed by: Fabrice Du Welz
- Screenplay by: Stephen Cornwell; Oliver Butcher
- Produced by: Stephen Cornwell; David Lancaster; Simon Cornwell
- Starring: Chadwick Boseman; Luke Evans; Teresa Palmer; Alfred Molina
- Cinematography: Monica Lenczewska
- Edited by: Beatrice Sisul
- Music by: Vincent Cahay; Felix Penny
- Production companies: Sierra Affinity; Entertainment One; The Ink Factory; The Joker Films; Entre Chien & Loup
- Distributed by: Netflix
- Release dates: September 8, 2016 (TIFF); May 10, 2017 (France); August 4, 2017 (United States)
- Running time: 102 minutes
- Countries: United States; United Kingdom; France; Belgium
- Language: English
- Budget: $10 million
- Box office: $315,132

Message from the King is a 2016 revenge-action-thriller film directed by Fabrice Du Welz, and written by Stephen Cornwell and Oliver Butcher. The film is produced by Cornwell, David Lancaster and Simon Cornwell and stars Chadwick Boseman, Luke Evans, Teresa Palmer, and Alfred Molina. The film's plot revolves around Jacob King (Boseman), a man from Cape Town, South Africa who travels to Los Angeles in order to find his younger sister and, after finding out she is dead, he works to avenge her death.

The project was announced on November 4, 2014, along with Boseman's casting. Principal photography began in February 2015 in Los Angeles, California. Other filming locations included Cape Town, South Africa, Glendale, Beverly Hills and Topanga.

The film premiered at the 2016 Toronto International Film Festival on September 8, 2016. It received mixed reviews from critics, with praise directed at Boseman's performance and criticism aimed at the script and the overall pacing. Netflix released the film on August 4, 2017.

== Plot ==
Jacob King, who lives in Cape Town receives a message from his estranged sister Bianca, who lives in Los Angeles with her husband and stepson, that she is in trouble and has something "they" want. King flies to Los Angeles with a return ticket dated seven days later, intent on finding his sister and booking cheap lodging. Upon arriving at his sister's address, he meets a neighbor who held some of Bianca's belongings, given to her shortly before Bianca disappeared. The neighbor also informs King that his sister's husband had disappeared earlier, leaving his son with Bianca.

Jacob finds Bianca's landlady, who says that a local business owner, Zico, suddenly paid Bianca's rent before she left, and that Bianca had been strung out and beat up before departing. King finds Zico with a group of men, and they deny any knowledge of Bianca. A local shopkeeper tips King to look for his sister in the morgue, and King finds her corpse there, tortured and mutilated.

Among Bianca's belongings, King finds several photographs of her with various men, including the gang member who had paid her rent but denied knowing her, a dentist's business card, and a pack of cigarettes. King confronts Zico and mutilates his face, telling him to relate to his superior, Duke, that this is "a message from the King", and then steals Zico's phone. At a party held by Bianca's neighbor Trish, King learns that Bianca had been associated with the gang and a drug dealer, named Frankie. He lures Bianca's dealer Frankie to the party and beats him for information, then steals his phone.

Back at the motel, King accidentally interrupts a prostitute. The prostitute, glad he has not called the police, allows King to "rent" her car.

King goes to the dentist under the guise of a referral from his sister and he meets the connected Dr. Wentworth, who says that Bianca was being pimped out to pay her husband's debts and that she often disappeared. After the meeting, it is revealed that she was involved with a politician running for office, Frank Leary, who gives Wentworth the contact details for two hitmen to make the problem disappear.

King follows Wentworth to the home of a wealthy Hollywood producer, Mike Preston, whom Wentworth shakes down for $100,000 to cover the cost of the hitmen, and another $750,000 of blackmail money due to his involvement with Bianca's death. At the house, King notices his sister's stepson, Armand, living at the mansion. Wentworth notices King's car when leaving Preston's house and calls the hitmen.

Later that day, the hitmen, two LAPD officers, arrest King. King, realizing he is going to be killed, manages to escape, taking a beating in the process. His motel neighbor, Kelly, the prostitute who had lent King her car, finds him near the motel and nurses him back to health in her room.

The gang realizes that Kelly's car was not stolen. King recovers from his beating, creates a bomb out of materials from a hardware store, and plants the bomb in a bag with money and the drugs he took from Frankie. King finds an encrypted SD card in Bianca's belongings, hidden in a pack of cigarettes. Realizing this is what her killers wanted, he is only able to listen to snippets of audio but understands that Preston is the target. He sneaks into Preston's home and forces him to decrypt the file, which reveals camera footage of Preston committing acts of pedophilia on Armand during a party. The footage also reveals Leary engaging in sex acts with Bianca during an orgy.

Preston reveals that Bianca's husband had fallen into serious debts, and the debtors forced Bianca to take drugs and pimped her out to pay them back. They killed her husband but continued to pimp her out, so she sold her stepson to Preston for money. When she realized that he was raping Armand, she stole the footage and called King for help.

Preston asked Wentworth to fix the issue, and Wentworth hired the gang members to kill Bianca. King lures Duke, his gang members, and Wentworth to Preston's mansion, and then kills Preston. Duke and Wentworth open the bag left by King, triggering the bomb, and both are killed. King takes Armand back to Kelly's motel, intent on rescuing the boy, but the sole surviving member of the gang—the one King maimed a few days earlier—ambushes him in the room. The boy escapes before King is able to win. King gives chase to Armand but ultimately gives up.

King drops Kelly and her daughter at the bus stop where she will return to her home town in New Mexico. He hands her a bag which has money he took from Preston's mansion earlier. As he is walking away, Leary's posters can be seen on the walls of the city of Los Angeles. King returns to South Africa where he is welcomed back and is revealed to be a detective with the local police force.

== Cast ==
- Chadwick Boseman as Jacob King
- Luke Evans as Dr. Paul Wentworth
- Teresa Palmer as Kelly
- Natalie Martinez as Trish
- Alfred Molina as Mike Preston
- Tom Felton as Frankie
- Dale Dickey as Mrs. Lazlo
- Jake Weary as Bill
- Drew Powell as Merrick
- Chris Mulkey as Frank Leary
- Tom Wright as Waylon
- Sibongile Mlambo as Bianca King
- Anna Diop as Becca
- Ava Kolker as Boot
- Roman Mitichyan as Vrioni
- Lucan Melkonian as Zico
- James Jordan as Scott
- Arthur Darbinyan as Duke
- Diego Josef as Armand
- Jonno Roberts as Rice
- Wade Williams as Keegan
- Patrick Campbell background
- Mandy Campbell background

== Production ==
In November 2014, it was announced that Chadwick Boseman's next film would be Message from the King, portraying Jacob King, a South African man avenging the death of his sister in Los Angeles. Principal photography began in February 2015 in Los Angeles, California. In March 2015, it was announced that Natalie Martinez joined as Trish, the former neighbor of Bianca's.

The film was shot in Glendale, California. Some scenes were shot at the Los Angeles County Morgue.

== Release ==
Message from the King premiered on September 8, 2016, at the 2016 Toronto International Film Festival. Netflix released the film on August 4, 2017.

== Reception ==
On the review aggregator website Rotten Tomatoes, the film holds an approval rating of 45%, based on 11 reviews, and an average rating of 4.9/10. On Metacritic, the film has a weighted average score of 40 out of 100, based on 5 critics, indicating "mixed or average reviews".
