= Monica Maurice =

British industrialist (1908–1995)

Helen Monica Maurice
- Helen Maurice
- Born: 30 June 1908; Hucknall
- Died: 20 September 1995 (aged 87); Ashford in the Water
- Other name: Lt. Colonel Maurice
- Occupation: Production engineer
- Employer: Wolf Safety Lamp Company
- Known for: First woman member of the Association of Mining Electrical Engineers and Managing Director of the Wolf Safety Lamp Company

Helen Monica Maurice OBE (30 June 1908 – 20 September 1995) was an industrialist and Managing Director and Chairman of the Wolf Safety Lamp Company, Sheffield, and the first, and for 40 years the only, woman member of the Association of Mining Electrical Engineers. She was known as “the Lady of the Lamp” in the coal fields of Yorkshire.

== Early life and education ==
Monica Maurice was born in Hucknall Torkard, near Nottingham, and brought up in the industrial north Midlands, the eldest of three daughters. Her father was William Maurice (1872–1951), founder of the Wolf Safety Lamp Company, a manufacturer of safety lamps for mining and quarrying; he had purchased the business rights from Friemann and Wolf of Zwickau, Saxony, Germany, in 1910.

She and her sisters were all educated at a pioneering co-educational preparatory school at Grindleford, Derbyshire, and at the independent school Bedales in Hampshire, where she studied from 1922 to 1927; she was head girl there in 1926. As her son William wrote in her obituary, she had a talent for languages and design and continued her studies at the Sorbonne, in Paris, and at Hamburg University; 'even as a young girl there was a steely determination to be successful.' She completed her education at Mrs. Hoster's Commercial Training College, London, where she acquired 'a first-class knowledge of office management and qualified as a shorthand writer and typist in three languages.'

== Career ==
Her career began in February 1930, first as secretary to her father at the company, where she also studied the technique of electric mine lamp design, the manufacture of alkaline storage batteries, and maintaining installations in efficient running order, among other aspects. In 1931 she was apprenticed as an engineer in Germany with the former parent company, Friemann and Wolf, then the world's largest firm of mine lampmakers. Her training included the drawing office, laboratory, machine shops and foundry and she visited the coal mines of Westphalia. She made other visits to Germany throughout the 1930s, and on one occasion 'she wandered into a restricted zone and saw what she thought was a guidance system. This she reported to the British authorities on her return, but they were not interested. At the outbreak of war though, she was summoned to London for a three-day debriefing. This experience, her knowledge of technical German and her familiarity with many of the industrial sites proved invaluable.'

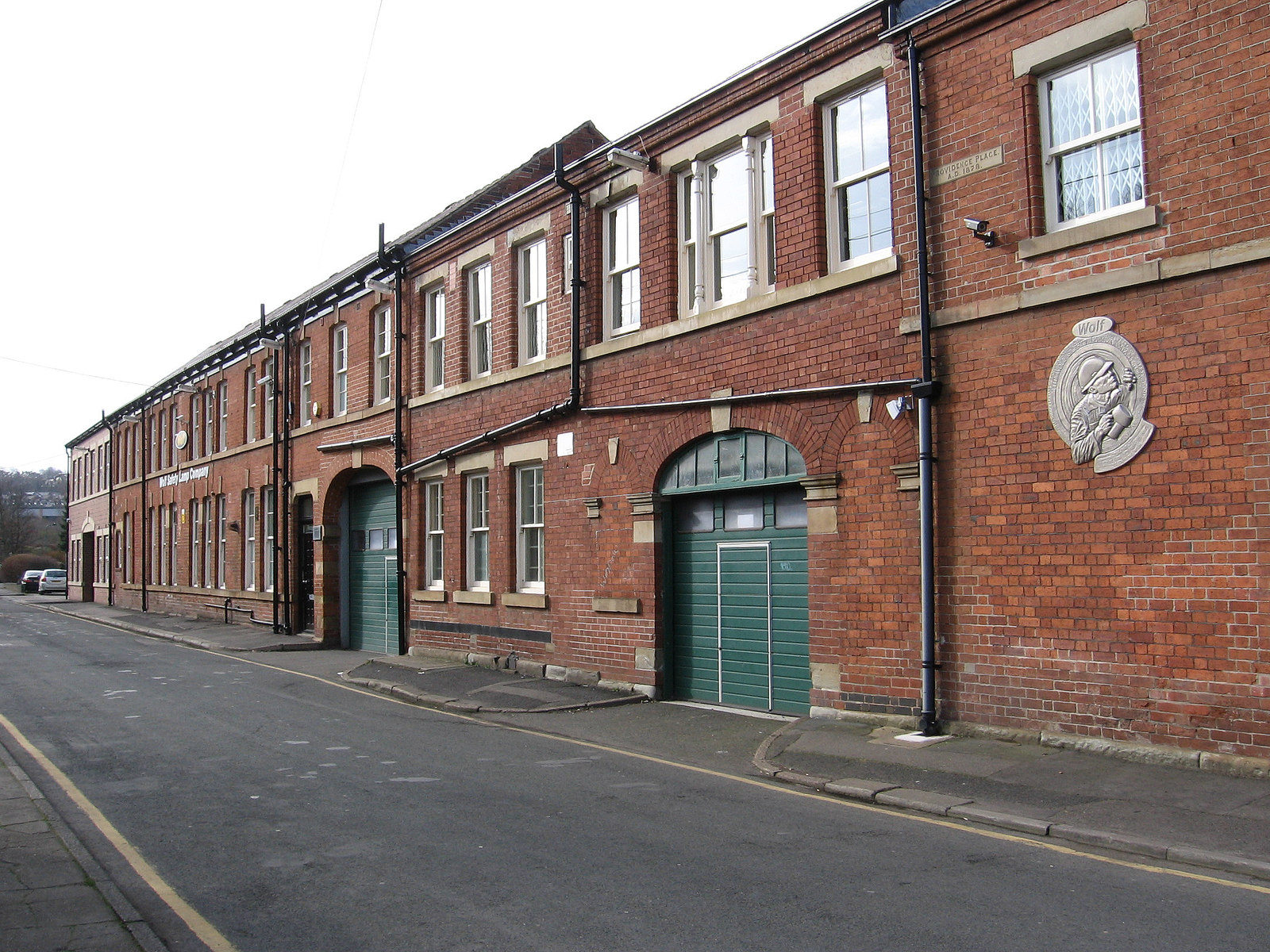
The Wolf Safety Lamp Company in Heeley

In 1932 Maurice was made a director and a departmental manager of her family's company, with responsibility for the planning and operation of vast numbers of lamps at collieries in every coalfield in the UK. This work continued over sixty years until her retirement in 1992. In 1934 she was elected a Director of the Wolf Safety Lamp Co. (Wm. Maurice), Ltd and she was later Managing Director from 1951 to 1979 and Chairman from 1951 to 1988. In 1930 she gave a paper on 'Mines and Miners in Art and Letters' (in French) at the Congres International des Mines, de la Metallurgie et de la Geologie Appliquee, at Liege, France, which was printed in the congress's Proceedings. In 1931 she attended the International Conference of Illuminating Engineers during their first visit to England. In July 1935 she deputised for her father at another meeting of the same organisation, held in Berlin and Karlsruhe, Germany, and played an active role in promoting arrangements for the establishment of an international standard of lighting for mines. She joined the Women's Engineering Society (WES) as a member in 1935 and organised the fourteenth annual conference for WES in 1936 in Sheffield. She was the second woman (after Caroline Haslett) to be elected a Companion of the Institution of Electrical Engineers, and in 1938 became the first – and until 1978 only – female member of the Association of Mining Electrical Engineers.

During World War II, while production at the Wolf factory continued, Maurice served on the British Standards Committee for mine lamp bulbs, personal safety and safety footwear, along with standardisation of screw threads during wartime. In 1947, with the rank of lieutenant-colonel, she took part in a British intelligence overseas survey mission to Germany to determine the extent and subsequent recovery in certain specialised industries. According to her obituary, during this visit her group were reporting their arrival at a town near Cologne 'when an arrogant young British captain dismissed their request for accommodation and supplies. She came forward and quietly suggested that she might be forced to pull rank and suddenly rooms were available in the local hotel, as well as fuel and rations for the onward journey.'

In 1975 Maurice was appointed OBE. In later life she lived in Ashford in the Water in the Peak District of Derbyshire, and died on 20 September 1995.

Her son John Jackson became Chairman of the company and two grandsons, Miles Jackson and Alex Jackson, also work for Wolf Safety.

== Personal life and interests ==
Monica Maurice married a Canadian doctor, Arthur Newton Jackson (1904–1985), on 18 June 1938, the Chapel of Our Lady on Rotherham Bridge in South Yorkshire; they had two sons, William and John, and one daughter, Willa. At her wedding she wore a fashionable red silk gauze dress, a bold choice for the time, and which is now in the collection of the Victoria and Albert Museum, London.

She had a passion for cars and planes, qualified as a pilot in early 1935, and was the first woman in Sheffield to obtain the 'A' certificate of the Air Ministry. Maurice was known for her insistence on a high level of cleanliness in the lamp rooms she managed and once told a story against herself. Staff had discovered she was learning to fly and a lamp man said “you know, I don’t know ‘as I ‘old with this ‘ere flying. One time I used to know when Miss Maurice was in the district, and now where never I ‘ears an aeroplane I comes over all of a sweat like and starts polishing.”

In December 1935, The Woman Engineer noted that she 'is now practising advanced aerobatics as weekend recreation. Incidentally, she is a good horse-woman and keen on swimming and dancing.' Her obituary recorded that she also had an insatiable passion for cars and that by the 1930s she would race a friend to the York Aviation Flying Club at Sherburn in Elmet, North Yorkshire, of which she was a member. She was a friend of the aviator Amy Johnson, delivering a speech proposing her for re-election as President of WES in 1936.

Miss Maurice's portrait was painted by Slade educated artist Janet Patterson in the 1980s after she visited her at Wolf Lamp Company offices on Saxone Road, Sheffield. It shows her sitting in her office at the company works. The watercolour hung in Miss Maurice's office for some time and was later exhibited in the Morley Gallery in London and in the former Mappin Art Gallery in Sheffield in 1986. Sheffield Museums Trust acquired the painting for their collection in 2017 and it is currently on display in the Graves Art Gallery in Sheffield. Patterson is married to Maurice's son William.

== Commemoration ==
A blue plaque commemorating the life and work of Maurice was unveiled on the wall of the Wolf Safety Lamp building in May 2025.
