= Nick Harkaway =

British novelist and commentator (born 1972)

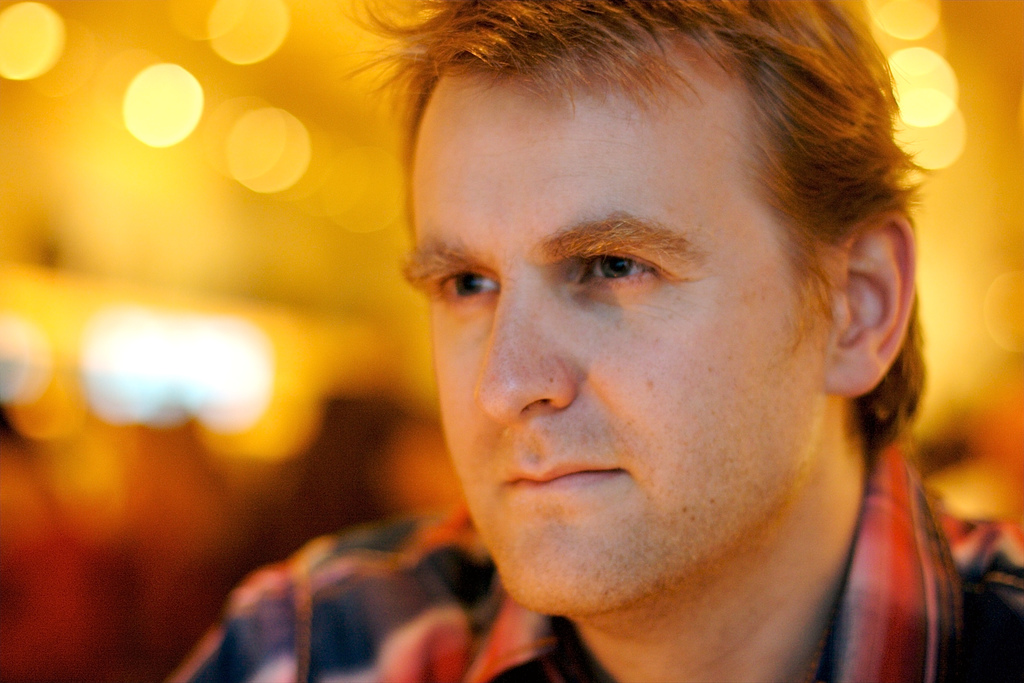
- Born: Nicholas Cornwell; 26 November 1972 (age 53); Cornwall, England
- Education: Clare College, Cambridge
- Occupations: Novelist, commentator
- Spouse: Clare Algar
- Children: 2
- Parent(s): John le Carré (father); Jane Cornwell (mother)
- Relatives: Simon Cornwell (half-brother); Stephen Cornwell (half-brother); Tim Cornwell (half-brother)
- Writing career
- Pen name: Aidan Truhen
- Genres: Fantasy, Spy fiction, Thriller (as Aidan Truhen)
- Notable works: The Gone-Away World, Angelmaker, The Blind Giant, Gnomon, Karla's Choice
- Website: Official website

Nicholas Cornwell (born 26 November 1972), better known by his pen name Nick Harkaway, is a British novelist and commentator. As Harkaway, he is the author of the novels The Gone-Away World, Angelmaker (which was nominated for the 2013 Arthur C. Clarke Award), Tigerman, Gnomon, Titanium Noir, and Karla's Choice; and a non-fiction study of the digital world, The Blind Giant: Being Human in a Digital World. Cornwell has also written two novels under the pseudonym Aidan Truhen.

== Biography ==
Harkaway was born Nicholas Cornwell in Cornwall, the son of the author John le Carré (real name David Cornwell) and his second wife Jane Eustace.

Harkaway was educated at the independent University College School in North London, and Clare College, Cambridge, where he studied philosophy, sociology and politics and took up Shorinji Kan Jiu Jitsu. He worked in the film industry before becoming an author.

Harkaway's first novel, The Gone-Away World, was published in 2008. Originally titled The Wages of Gonzo Lubitsch, it concerns a number of ex-special forces operatives turned truckers who are hired to perform a dangerous mission in a post-apocalyptic world.

In October 2026 Amazon Prime Video premiered Kill Jackie, the first TV series based on one of Harkaway's books. The show, based on the pseudonymously published novel The Price You Pay, stars Catherine Zeta-Jones.

== Personal life ==
Harkaway is married to Clare Algar, an intellectual property lawyer and managing director of John le Carré, Ltd. They have two children.

== Views on Google Book settlement ==
Harkaway has been an outspoken critic of the Google Book Search Settlement Agreement, posting on his blog, speaking out on BBC Radio's The World at One in May 2009, and appearing on a television debate with Krishnan Guru-Murthy and Tom Watson MP in September 2009.

== Publications ==
=== Stand-alone fiction ===
- The Gone-Away World (2008)
- Angelmaker (2013)
- Tigerman (2014)
- Gnomon (2017)

=== Non-fiction ===
- The Blind Giant (2012)

=== Short stories ===
- "Edie Investigates" (2012)
- "Keeping Up with the Joneses" (2015) – Doctor Who story collected in Time Trips
- "Billy Tumult" (2015) – collected in Stories for Chip

=== The Price You Pay series as Aidan Truhen ===
- The Price You Pay (2018)
- Seven Demons (2021)

=== Titanium Noir series ===
- Titanium Noir (2023)
- Sleeper Beach (2025)

=== George Smiley continuation series ===
- Karla's Choice (2024)
- The Taper Man (2026)

== Television work ==
- Kill Jackie (2026) – writer
- Legacy of Spies (TBA) – executive producer
