= Marcus Kalisch =

German-British biblical scholar

- Born: May 16, 1828; Treptow, Pomerania
- Died: August 25, 1885 (aged 57); Derbyshire, England
- Education: Berlin University, Rabbinical College of Berlin
- Occupation: Jewish scholar
- Known for: Pioneering critical study of the Old Testament in England
- Notable work: Commentary on the Pentateuch, Bible studies, Hebrew grammar, "Path and Goal"

Marcus Kalisch (or Moritz) (May 16, 1828 – August 25, 1885) was a Jewish scholar born in Treptow, Pomerania, and died in Derbyshire, England.

He was educated at Berlin University, where he studied classics, philology, and the Semitic languages, and at the Rabbinical College of Berlin. In 1848 he obtained degrees at Berlin and at Halle, and in the same year took part in the European struggle for freedom that resulted in the émeute of 1848.

He was one of the pioneers of the critical study of the Old Testament in England. At one time he was secretary to the Chief Rabbi; in 1853 he became tutor in the Rothschild family and enjoyed leisure to produce his commentaries and other works.

The first installment of his commentary on the Pentateuch was Exodus (1855); this was followed by Genesis (1858) and Leviticus in two parts (1867–1872). These contain a résumé of all that Jewish and Christian learning had accumulated on the subjects up to the dates of publication. Kalisch wrote before the publication of Julius Wellhausen's works, and anticipated him in some important points.

Besides these works, Kalisch published in 1877–1878 two volumes of Bible studies (on Balaam and Jonah). He was also author of a once popular Hebrew grammar in two volumes (1862–1863). In 1880 he published Path and Goal, a brilliant discussion of human destiny. He also wrote Historical and critical commentary on the Old Testament in four volumes.

His commentaries are of permanent value, not only because of the author's originality, but also because of his exceptional erudition. However, he did lack an equal power of using his resources for literary purposes. Still, his views on biblical and Jewish subjects generally were of an advanced type. No other works in English contain such full citations of earlier literature. He was prevented from completing his projected comprehensive commentary on the entire Pentateuch by the ill health which attended his last years.

In the 1860s, Kalisch was living in St Pancras, London, where his only daughter, Constance Hoster was born in 1864, a year after his son Alfred Kalisch, who later became a barrister and journalist.
