= Fifth Season (company) =

American global film and television company

- Logo used since 2022
- Formerly: Endeavor Content (2017–2022)
- Type: Subsidiary
- Industry: Film; Television
- Founded: October 2017; 9 years ago
- Founder: Chris Rice; Graham Taylor
- Headquarters: Los Angeles, United States
- Number of locations: 8
- Area served: Worldwide
- Key people: Graham Taylor (CEO); Kasee Calabrese (CFO/COO)
- Products: Feature films Television series Home video
- Owner: CJ ENM (60%); Toho International (25%); WME Group (15%)
- Number of employees: 200–250
- Parent: Endeavor (2017–2022); CJ ENM (2022-present)
- Divisions: Feature Film; Television; Documentary & Non-Scripted; Distribution
- Website: Official website

Fifth Season (formerly Endeavor Content) is an American multinational film and television production and distribution company. Fifth Season has financed, produced and distributed TV series and films such as Severance, Killing Eve, The Night Manager, Tokyo Vice, Flora and Son, Cha Cha Real Smooth, and The Lost Daughter. Fifth Season is headquartered in West Los Angeles, California, with offices in Los Angeles, New York, London, Miami, Stockholm, Hong Kong, and Colombia.

The company was originally formed by Endeavor Group Holdings in 2017. In January 2022, an 80% majority stake was sold to CJ ENM, part of the South Korean conglomerate CJ Group. In December 2023, CJ ENM sold 25% of its ownership stake to Japanese studio Toho.

== History ==
=== Endeavor Content ===
Endeavor Content was formed in October 2017 from the Endeavor Group's film financing and scripted TV sales units, WME's advisory group for film financiers and content producers, and international sales company Bloom, which continued to operate autonomously until 2018, when it was fully integrated into Endeavor Content.

=== Sale to CJ ENM and rebranding to Fifth Season ===
In 2021, Endeavor announced its intent to divest Endeavor Content, due to a new franchising deal with the Writers Guild of America that prohibits talent agencies from holding more than a 20% stake in a production company. Implemented as part of a new code of conduct also targeting movie packaging agreements, the WGA had deemed studio ownership by a talent agency to be a conflict of interest.

In November 2021, Endeavor announced an agreement to sell an 80% controlling stake in Endeavor Content's scripted content business to CJ ENM for US$775 million, marking the South Korean conglomerate's largest purchase to-date. Endeavor would keep the company's non-scripted production assets, and Graham Taylor and Chris Rice would remain co-CEOs of the company. The acquisition closed in January 2022.

In September 2022, CJ ENM renamed the studio to Fifth Season, introducing a new mosaic-themed logo. The name is derived from a term in Asian medicine referring to the harvest season.

In December 2023, Japanese studio Toho announced it would acquire a 25% stake in Fifth Season through its American subsidiary Toho International for $225 million. The deal valued the company at $900 million. Taylor and Rice stated that this deal would allow the company to continue expanding its offerings and create opportunities to work with Toho and CJ ENM on both Japanese and global content. In 2026, the company signed a deal with Media Res International for a distributing deal.

== Productions ==
=== Films ===
Title	Year	Distributor
Book Club	2018	Paramount Pictures
The Informer	2019	Warner Bros. Pictures
The Peanut Butter Falcon	2019	Roadside Attractions
Hala	2019	Apple TV+
Just Mercy	2019	Warner Bros. Pictures
Bill & Ted Face the Music	2020	Orion Pictures (through United Artists Releasing)
Cherry	2021	Apple Studios
Blue Miracle	2021	Netflix
In the Heights	2021	Warner Bros. Pictures
Pig	2021	Neon
The Lost Daughter	2021	Netflix
Cha Cha Real Smooth	2022	Apple Studios
Ambulance	2022	Universal Pictures
My Best Friend's Exorcism	2022	Amazon MGM Studios
Maybe I Do	2023	Vertical Entertainment
80 for Brady	2023	Paramount Pictures
Book Club: The Next Chapter	2023	Focus Features
Bones of Crows	2023	Elevation Pictures
Flora and Son	2023	Apple Studios
Eileen	2023	Neon
The Long Game	2024	Mucho Mas Media and Bonniedale Entertainment
Jim Henson Idea Man	2024	Disney+
La cocina	2024	Willa
Friendship	2024	A24
Girl Haunts Boy	2024	Fifth Season
Nonnas	2025	Netflix
A Working Man	2025	Amazon MGM Studios
Anniversary	2025	Lionsgate Films
Animals	2026	Netflix
Earth, Wind & Fire (To Be Celestial vs That's the Weight of the World)	2026	HBO Documentary Films
Gold Mountain	TBA	TBA
You Deserve Each Other	TBA	Amazon MGM Studios
Samo Lives	TBA	TBA
A Head Full of Ghosts	TBA	Lionsgate
The Peasant	TBA	A24
Nightwatching	TBA	TBA

=== Television series ===
Title	Years	Network
Wayne	2019	YouTube Premium
Limetown	2019	Facebook Watch
See	2019–2022	Apple TV+
Truth Be Told	2019–2023	Apple TV+
The Eddy	2020	Netflix
McCartney 3,2,1	2021	Hulu
Nine Perfect Strangers	2021–present	Hulu
Scenes from a Marriage	2021	HBO
Wolf Like Me	2022–2024	Peacock
Severance	2022–present	Apple TV+
Life & Beth	2022–2024	Hulu
Tokyo Vice	2022–2024	Max
Anatomy of a Scandal	2022	Netflix
Roar	2022	Apple TV+
Surfside Girls	2022	Apple TV+
The Lost Flowers of Alice Hart	2023	Amazon Prime Video
Lady in the Lake	2024	Apple TV+
Omnivore	2024	Apple TV+
The Last Anniversary	2025	Binge
Chief of War	2025	Apple TV+
His & Hers	2026	Netflix
East of Eden	2026	Netflix
The Good Daughter	2026-present	Peacock
American Classic	2026	MGM+
The Savant	2026-present	Apple TV

=== Distribution ===
Fifth Season globally distributes series including Killing Eve, Wild Cards, The Morning Show, Normal People, and The Night Manager.
