= The Night Manager (British TV series) =

2016 British television spy thriller series

- Series 2 title card
- Genre: Drama; Espionage; Spy thriller
- Based on: The Night Manager by John le Carré
- Written by: David Farr
- Directed by: Susanne Bier; Georgi Banks-Davies
- Starring: Tom Hiddleston; Hugh Laurie; Olivia Colman; Tom Hollander; Elizabeth Debicki; Diego Calva; Camila Morrone; Paul Chahidi; Hayley Squires; Indira Varma
- Music by: Victor Reyes
- Country of origin: United Kingdom
- Original language: English
- No. of series: 2
- No. of episodes: 12

Production
- Executive producers: David Farr; Susanne Bier; John le Carré; Tom Hiddleston; Hugh Laurie; Stephen Garrett; Simon Cornwell; Stephen Cornwell; William D. Johnson; Georgi Banks-Davies; Clare Cornwell; Chris Rice; Joseph Tsai; Arthur Wang; Tessa Inkelaar; Michele Wolkoff; Adrian Guerra
- Producers: Rob Bullock; Matthew Patnick
- Cinematography: Michael Snyman
- Running time: 55–60 minutes
- Production companies: The Ink Factory; Demarest Films; Hangtime International Pictures; Nostromo Pictures; Character 7; 127 Wall; Amazon MGM Studios (Note: Credited as producing in the international broadcast. Also hold international distribution rights along with Fifth Season)

Original release
- Network: BBC One (United Kingdom)
- Release: 21 February 2016 – present
- Network: AMC (United States; series 1)
- Release: 19 April – 24 May 2016
- Network: Prime Video (Worldwide (Note: Excluding the United Kingdom); series 2)
- Release: 11 January 2026 – present

The Night Manager is a British spy thriller television serial based on the 1993 novel by John le Carré and adapted by David Farr. The six-part first series, directed by Susanne Bier and starring Tom Hiddleston, Hugh Laurie, Olivia Colman, Tom Hollander, David Harewood and Elizabeth Debicki, began broadcasting on BBC One on 21 February 2016.

The Night Manager was nominated for thirty-six awards and won eleven, including two Primetime Emmy Awards (for director Bier and music composer Victor Reyes) and three Golden Globe Awards (for Hiddleston, Colman, and Laurie). In April 2024, The Night Manager was renewed for a second and third series by BBC One and Amazon Prime Video, with Hiddleston and Colman reprising their roles, and Georgi Banks-Davies directing. The second series premiered in the UK on 1 January 2026.

In 2023, an Indian adaptation of the same name was released.

== Premise ==
Jonathan Pine, night manager of a luxury hotel in Cairo and former British soldier, is recruited by Angela Burr, the manager of a Foreign Office task force investigating illegal arms sales, to infiltrate the inner circle of arms dealer Richard Roper.

== Cast and characters ==
=== Overall ===
==== Main ====
- Tom Hiddleston as Jonathan Pine, a former military officer and hotel night manager seeking to bring down Richard Roper
- Hugh Laurie as Richard "Dickie" Onslow Roper, a charismatic but ruthless arms dealer (Note: Laurie is credited as a guest star in the first and third episodes of series 2, before being restored to the main cast from episode 4.)
- Olivia Colman as Angela Burr, the Head of the Foreign Office's International Enforcement Agency, seeking to bring down Roper
- Alistair Petrie as Alexander "Sandy" Langbourne, Lord Langbourne, Roper's financial director
- Douglas Hodge as Rex Mayhew, Burr's supportive superior at the Foreign Office
- Michael Nardone as Frisky, one of Richard Roper's henchmen
- Noah Jupe as Danny Roper (series 2; supporting series 1), Roper's young son

=== Series 1 ===
==== Main ====
- Tom Hollander as Major Lance "Corky" Corkoran, Roper's second in command and front man
- Elizabeth Debicki as Jemima "Jed" Marshall, Roper's girlfriend and a secret love interest of Pine
- Natasha Little as Caroline "Caro" Langbourne, Lady Langbourne, Sandy's wife and Jed's friend
- David Harewood as Joel Steadman, an American ATF agent and ally of Burr
- Tobias Menzies as Geoffrey Dromgoole, a senior MI6 official antagonistic to Burr's mission
- Antonio de la Torre as Juan Apostol, Roper's lawyer
- Adeel Akhtar as Rob Singhal, Burr's second in command at the IEA
- Hovik Keuchkerian as Tabby, one of Richard Roper's henchmen

==== Supporting ====
- Aure Atika as Sophie (Samira) Alekan, Hamid's girlfriend and Pine's secret lover in Egypt
- Amir El-Masry as Youssuf, a chef at the Nefertiti hotel and close friend of Pine
- Russell Tovey as Simon Ogilvey, an old friend of Pine's and a Foreign Office diplomat in Cairo
- David Avery as Freddie Hamid, an Egyptian playboy and ally of Roper
- Hannah Steele as Marilyn, a single mother Pine meets in Devon
- Neil Morrissey as Harry Palfrey, an MI6 officer working for Dromgoole, but sympathetic to Burr's mission
- Jonathan Aris as Raymond Galt, Dromgoole's deputy at MI6
- Nasser Memarzia as Omar Barghati, the head of a consortium seeking to buy weapons from Roper
- Katherine Kelly as Pamela, the Permanent Secretary of the Foreign Office and Mayhew's superior
- Bijan Daneshmand as Kouyami, a senior member of Barghati's consortium

=== Series 2 ===
==== Main ====
- Diego Calva as Teddy Dos Santos, a Colombian arms dealer
- Camila Morrone as Roxana Bolaños, a Colombian businesswoman who reluctantly allies with Pine
- Paul Chahidi as Basil Karapetian, the Head of Technical at MI6 and an ally of Pine
- Hayley Squires as Sally Price-Jones, an MI6 officer and member of Pine's surveillance unit, the Night Owls
- Indira Varma as Mayra Cavendish, the Chief of the Secret Intelligence Service
- Kirby Howell-Baptiste as Dr Kim Saunders, Pine's MI6-mandated psychiatrist
- Slavko Sobin as Viktor, the chief enforcer working for Dos Santos
- Unax Ugalde as Juan Carrascal, a lawyer working for Dos Santos
- Alberto Ammann as Alejandro Gualteros, a Colombian prosecutor trying to bring down Dos Santos
- Diego Santos as Martín Álvarez, a Colombian private detective hired by Pine
- Cristina Umaña Rojas as Consuelo Arbenz, an attorney general and head of the Colombian Supreme Court

==== Supporting ====
- Alex Mugnaioni, Raphel Famotibe and Anil Desai as Graham, Mike and Waleed, three members of Pine's surveillance unit, the Night Owls
- Gijs Naber as Jaco Brouwer, a mercenary who previously worked for Roper
- Annabel Mullion as Celia Mayhew, Rex's wife
- Kerr Logan as Adam Holywell, an international business broker working with the criminal underworld
- Mario Bolaños as General Horacio Sánchez, a Colombian general on Dos Santos's payroll
- Luis Fernando Hoyos as José Cabrera, an exiled Colombian politician planning to overthrow the government
- Fabio Espinosa, Erik Rodríguez and Samuel Gómez López as Chico, Beni and Tavo, three of Dos Santos's henchmen

== Production ==
=== Series 1 ===
In January 2015, it was announced that the series, an adaptation of John le Carré's novel of the same name, would be co-produced by the BBC, AMC and The Ink Factory, starring Tom Hiddleston, Hugh Laurie and Olivia Colman in lead roles, written by David Farr and directed by Susanne Bier.

Filming began on 19 March 2015 in Zermatt, Switzerland. Production then moved to London. From 13 to 17 April 2015, location filming took place at Blackpool Mill Cottage, Hartland Abbey, and in and around Hartland, Devon. On 20 April 2015, production moved to Marrakesh, Morocco. The Es Saadi Resort was used as the location for the fictional Nefertiti Hotel in Cairo. At the end of May, production moved to Majorca, Spain; principal photography wrapped in Majorca on 3 July 2015. Notable places include Port de Sóller, luxury property La Fortaleza in Port de Pollença and several locations in Palma.

Le Carré makes a cameo appearance as an insulted restaurant diner in episode four.

=== Series 2 ===
In February 2023 it was reported that the second series was in development with Hiddleston set to return. In April 2024 it was announced that BBC and Amazon Prime Video had ordered a second and third series, with Hiddleston and Colman returning in lead roles and Laurie as an executive producer. Alistair Petrie, Noah Jupe, Douglas Hodge and Michael Nardone also reprise their roles from the first series, while Camila Morrone, Diego Calva, Indira Varma, Paul Chahidi and Hayley Squires joined the cast in lead roles. Georgi Banks-Davies serves as director for the second series.

Filming for the second series began on 14 June 2024 and concluded on 6 December 2024, as confirmed by director Georgi Banks-Davies on her Instagram account. Production reportedly spanned 93 shoot days and took place in several international locations including London for three weeks and Colombia for five. "More than 75% of the story is about Colombia", confirmed Barry Ryan, head of production at Ink Factory. Colombian drug barons featured in the original book but were replaced by Middle Eastern warlords in the first series that adapted it. Filming also took place in Spain, France and the Three Cliffs Bay area in Swansea, Wales.

A teaser trailer for Series 2 was broadcast on BBC One ahead of the Celebrity Traitors final in November 2025.

== Episodes ==
=== Series overview ===
Series	Episodes	Originally released	
Series	Episodes	First released	Last released
1	6	21 February 2016	27 March 2016
2	6	1 January 2026	1 February 2026

=== Series 1 (2016) ===
No. overall	No. in series	Title	Directed by	Written by	Original release date	UK viewers (millions) (Note: Based on 28-day data.)
1	1	"Episode 1"	Susanne Bier	David Farr	21 February 2016	10.18
Jonathan Pine, a British Army veteran working as night manager of the Nefertiti Hotel in Cairo during the 2011 Egyptian Revolution, becomes involved with Sophie Alekan, mistress of Egyptian playboy Freddie Hamid. Sophie gives Pine documents detailing Hamid's illegal weapons and chemical deals, which Pine passes to Angela Burr of the International Enforcement Agency in London. The information is leaked to arms dealer Richard Roper, who cancels the deal; Sophie is beaten, and when Pine tries to secure UK asylum for her through his contact Simon Ogilvey, he learns Hamid's government connections make it impossible. Burr attempts to help, but Sophie is murdered. Four years later, Pine, now night manager of the Meisters Hotel in Zermatt, is assigned to assist late-arriving guests, who turn out to be Roper and his entourage. Pine contacts Burr with intelligence stolen from Roper but initially refuses further involvement. Burr travels to Zermatt and persuades Pine to infiltrate Roper's organisation to help destroy it and avenge Sophie's death.
2	2	"Episode 2"	Susanne Bier	David Farr	28 February 2016	10.19
Burr's Operation Limpet places Pine inside Roper's organisation by giving him a non-official cover identity and sending him to Devon to fabricate a violent criminal background, during which he begins a romantic relationship with Marilyn, a single mother. Burr then dispatches Pine to Majorca, where Roper is negotiating an arms deal. There, agents stage an abduction of Roper's son Daniel at a seaside restaurant; Pine, posing as a chef, "rescues" Daniel by confronting the undercover kidnappers and provoking them into beating him to make the scenario convincing. Severely injured, he is brought to Roper, who remembers him from Switzerland and is wary of his new identity but grateful enough to take him into his villa to recuperate. Roper's deputy, Major Lance "Corky" Corcoran, interrogates Pine about his supposed criminal past and inconsistencies in his aliases. Meanwhile in London, Burr works to keep Operation Limpet covert, to avoid interference from the 'River House' (MI6).
3	3	"Episode 3"	Susanne Bier	David Farr	6 March 2016	9.74
Pine convinces Roper of his supposed criminal past. As a result, Roper insists he remain at the villa while they create a new identity for him, partly in gratitude for saving Daniel. Pine begins undermining Corky's standing within the organisation and grows closer to Roper's girlfriend, Jemima "Jed" Marshall. In Madrid, Roper's lawyer, Juan "Apo" Apostol, hosts a birthday party for his daughter, Elena, attended by Roper and his entourage; Elena later hangs herself from shame over her father's illicit dealings. Burr finds the devastated Apo and attempts to win his trust. At the villa, Pine discovers Roper's secret study and steals the key; during a daily alarm test, he breaks in to photograph documents detailing Tradepass, Roper's shell company used to disguise arms sales as agricultural equipment. The next day, Roper gives Pine a passport under the alias Andrew Birch and, convinced by Pine's story and frustrated with Corky's worsening alcoholism, appoints him frontman of Tradepass. Meanwhile in London, officials at the River House led by Geoffrey Dromgoole attempt to take control of Operation Limpet from Burr's superior, Rex Mayhew. When Mayhew resists, Dromgoole's deputy Raymond Galt alerts Roper and his financial manager Sandy Langbourne to Limpet's existence.
4	4	"Episode 4"	Susanne Bier	David Farr	13 March 2016	9.61
Roper expands Pine's new identity as Andrew Birch and plans to introduce him to prospective Tradepass buyers. At the IEA, Burr gives Mayhew and ATF agent Joel Steadman the Tradepass documents Pine photographed, revealing Roper's massive weapons-sale profits and commissions paid to two codenames, "Halo" and "Felix". Burr learns from Harry Palfrey of Dromgoole's team that Halo is Dromgoole and Felix is Barbara Vandon, the CIA station chief in London; both help falsify documents to support Roper's deals. Mayhew shows the documents to Pamela, the Foreign Office's Permanent Secretary, to prevent the IEA from being shut down, but Pamela leaks them to Dromgoole, who informs Roper. Roper, believing Apo is the source, has him killed. While Roper is away, Pine and Jed act on their attraction and sleep together; Corky discovers this and begins threatening them. Burr learns of Pine's involvement with Jed and orders him out, but Pine refuses, noting Roper is preparing a major weapons sale in Istanbul. When Burr persists, Pine warns Roper they are being watched, allowing Roper's team to escape the IEA's surveillance.
5	5	"Episode 5"	Susanne Bier	David Farr	20 March 2016	9.67
After escaping, Roper tells Pine he had Apo murdered and reveals he now suspects Pine, Jed, Langbourne, or Corky of being another mole. Roper's entourage travels to Turkey to a compound called The Haven, run by mercenaries who manage his distribution network and its aid-organisation cover. Pine is assigned to arrange a weapons demonstration for buyers led by Omar Barghati. In London, Pamela reassigns Mayhew to a Royal Household post, and Dromgoole tries to intimidate Burr into abandoning Limpet. Pine records the registration numbers of the "aid convoy" meant to deliver the weapons and secretly urges Jed to frame Corky; she subtly does so. Pine slips out to deliver the convoy note to Burr, but Corky catches him, and Pine kills him in a fight. He tells Roper that Corky was meeting someone outside the fence. Burr secures a U.S. military inspection of Roper's trucks at the Syrian border, but they contain only agricultural equipment. Pine realises Roper never stored the weapons at the compound. Steadman claims Pine has turned, but Burr rejects this. Roper's group heads to Cairo, where he contacts Hamid. In London, Burr returns home to find it ransacked and her husband wounded.
6	6	"Episode 6"	Susanne Bier	David Farr	27 March 2016	9.90
After the border failure, the IEA is disbanded. Pine contacts Burr, who arrives in Cairo with Steadman, and convinces them the arms deal can be stopped. Jed secures the code to Roper's hotel safe, allowing Burr and Steadman to steal the weapons' registration certificates while Roper is away. Pine spikes Hamid's drinks, escorts him home, learns Roper ordered Sophie's murder, and drowns him. Pine then works with ex-colleague Youssuf and his Muslim Brotherhood contacts to infiltrate the weapons compound. The next morning, Jed is caught; Roper has her waterboarded and concludes Pine is the mole. At the compound, Roper threatens Jed's life unless Pine completes the sale, unaware Burr has already rescued her. When the consortium arrives, Pine detonates the trucks remotely (Youssuf's contacts having planted explosives), revealing he moved the $300 million down payment out of the Tradepass account. The enraged buyers demand repayment. Pine tells Roper he can access the money only if Jed is freed. At the hotel, Burr confronts Roper; he discovers she has blackmailed Dromgoole into withdrawing support. Local police arrest Roper and his team, but his furious buyers seize the convoy and take Roper away. Jed returns to America; Pine promises to visit her.

=== Series 2 (2026) ===
No. overall	No. in series	Title	Directed by	Written by	Original release date	UK viewers (millions)
7	1	"Episode 1"	Georgi Banks-Davies	David Farr	1 January 2026	8.72
In 2019, four years after Roper's downfall, Pine and Burr reunite in Syria to identify Roper's corpse after his execution by his captors. In 2025, Pine is working at the River House, reporting to Mayhew. Pine manages a surveillance unit called 'The Night Owls' that gathers intelligence on criminal activity. During an operation, Pine sees Jaco Brouwer, a former Roper mercenary. Pine alerts Mayhew and sanctions unauthorised surveillance of Brouwer. His team discovers Brouwer's connections to criminal broker Adam Holywell and MI6 chief Mayra Cavendish. Mayhew is murdered after informing Pine he had discovered something, with his killing covered up as a suicide. Pine discovers a hidden burner phone in Mayhew's home he used to contact a mole, Roxana Bolaños, a businesswoman working with Colombian philanthropist Teddy Dos Santos. Pine, after failing to gain insights from an older, cynical Danny, discovers Dos Santos is a former acolyte of Roper. Pine has Roxana taken into protective custody and follows Brouwer to Spain with two of his team members. Dos Santos arrives and discovers Brouwer has been compromised. Dos Santos murders him and Pine's team before detonating a bomb. In London, a gunman storms Roxana's safehouse.
8	2	"Episode 2"	Georgi Banks-Davies	David Farr	4 January 2026 (Note: This episode was released early by BBC iPlayer on 1 January 2026.)	7.56
In the aftermath of the bombing, Cavendish disbands the Night Owls. Pine fakes his death, aided by Sally Price-Jones, his suspended colleague, and Basil Karapetian, a senior MI6 official suspicious of Cavendish. Together, they establish an identity for Pine as playboy banker Matthew Ellis to go undercover in Colombia. There, Pine meets Dos Santos and discovers he is attempting to silence prosecutor Alejandro Gualteros, who has impounded a key shipment of his. In the UK, Basil deceives Cavendish whilst setting up surveillance on her operations. Invited to a charity gala, Pine reunites with Roxana and confronts her about her actual role with Mayhew. Roxana had been deployed to deceive Mayhew, but was unaware of the murders that would follow. Pine recruits Roxana to work for him. He also hires private detective Martín Álvarez to dig into Teddy's past. They discover his true identity as Eduardo Vidal, Roper's illegitimate lovechild. With Teddy's business accounts frozen by Gualteros, he approaches 'Ellis' for a loan. Pine is invited to Teddy's villa with Roxana to negotiate. They party and Pine is deliberately driven to inebriation by Teddy for questioning. However, Pine sticks to his cover story of having illegally stashed money to launder. Teddy accepts the offer.
9	3	"Episode 3"	Georgi Banks-Davies	David Farr	11 January 2026	7.45
Pine and Roxana work to obtain evidence of Teddy illegally importing British weaponry to Colombia. Roxana demands immunity and a new identity in return for her help. Sally and Basil take money from Roper's frozen bank account to provide Pine with the funds to 'invest' in Teddy's operation. With a fearful Gualteros on the verge of releasing the shipment, Pine breaks into the company office, but the evidence isn't there. Pine and Roxana clash. Teddy informs Pine that he will be sent back to Europe after his investment processes, so Pine reveals his knowledge of Teddy's arms deals. This spooks Teddy's lawyer, Juan Carrascal, into checking the office with Roxana. She covertly copies the documents he produces. Meanwhile, Pine is taken to Teddy's boat for interrogation. In London, Cavendish tasks Basil with recovering the Roper account, forcing him to pull the funds and endanger Pine. Basil manages to deceive Mayra into releasing the funds, saving Pine before he is murdered. Pine builds trust with Teddy and discovers his plan to create an army of disaffected orphans. Roxana gives the shipping documents to Pine. Sally, Martin and Pine follow Teddy to a meeting with his benefactor, revealed to be an alive Roper.
10	4	"Episode 4"	Georgi Banks-Davies	David Farr	18 January 2026	7.26
Roper has been living covertly in Colombia for six years, plotting to repay his debts by enacting regime change with aid from exiled leader José Cabrera, Teddy, Cavendish and Lord Sandy Langbourne. Martin spies on Roper, learning that he plans more British-backed coups under amnesty. Basil observes Holywell meeting Cavendish and Langbourne, tricking Holywell into revealing that Teddy possesses an electromagnetic pulse bomb, with MI6 enabling the coup. Sally creates a diversion to allow Gualteros to escape from Teddy's surveillance. Pine separates from Teddy at the airport and meets Burr, who discloses that Roper coerced her into staging his death or his Syrian captors would have killed her and Pine and their families. Teddy suspects Roxana after learning that Gualteros intends to share the shipping documents with the Head of the Supreme Court; however, Gualteros is intercepted by Teddy's military contacts and despite being warned by Roxana, Pine fails to stop Teddy from killing Gualteros. Pine rescues Roxana and a young driver, Octavo, who witnessed the shooting, although Teddy recognises Pine in the shootout and informs a vengeful Roper.
11	5	"Episode 5"	Georgi Banks-Davies	David Farr	25 January 2026	7.13
Roper orders Cavendish to undercut Pine's support network. Basil is caught attempting to flee London, but manages to leave his laptop with Burr. Cavendish has him tortured. Pine, Roxana and Octavo escape to her abandoned family home. Pine and Roxana argue after he admits he can no longer offer her immunity, before briefly acting on their sexual attraction. Roper rehires henchman Frisky and sidelines Teddy. Pine summons Roper to a meeting and demands that Roper surrender himself and his conspirators or face the consequence of failing to pay Barghati's consortium again. Roper refuses and attempts to bribe Pine into handing over Roxana and the documents to walk away freely. Pine refuses and escapes Frisky with help from Martin, who is recording Roper using a microphone hidden in the collar of one of his dogs. Sally contacts Chief Justice Consuelo Arbenz to help stop Roper and Cabrera's coup. Pine plays Teddy recordings of Roper privately disowning him, convincing Teddy to help him by revealing the coup's plans. Roper discovers Martin's surveillance, although Martin narrowly escapes. Mayra has Basil murdered after he refuses to divulge Pine's plan. Enraged that his operation has been exposed, Roper kills his dogs. A desperate Roxana hands herself over to Roper, who demands that she bring Pine to him.
12	6	"Episode 6"	Georgi Banks-Davies	David Farr	1 February 2026	7.35
Roxana, under orders from Roper, lures Pine to a meeting. He narrowly avoids being killed thanks to a tip-off from Teddy. Carrascal becomes suspicious of Teddy, forcing Teddy to kill him. Roper confronts Roxana, who suggests Teddy harbours feelings for Pine. Sally helps Chief Justice Arbenz escape her military escort, and together they assemble prosecutors and journalists to observe the EMP device's arrival. Pine and Teddy head to Cabrera's jungle base, with Pine posing as Teddy's prisoner. Teddy convinces Cabrera that Roper is planning to betray him, prompting Cabrera to divert the plane to Sally's location. Roper arrives at the jungle base and is held at gunpoint by Cabrera and his men. In London, Burr confronts Langbourne and then Mayra with evidence of their corruption, telling the latter that the coup has failed. However, back in Colombia, Roper reveals he sent two shipments. The EMP is dropped into the jungle whilst Sally and Arbenz receive an empty container. With Pine and Teddy's deceit exposed, Roper kills Teddy. A wounded Pine narrowly escapes with help from Martin and Octavo, although Martin sacrifices himself to allow the others to flee on foot. Roxana leaves Colombia, and Burr is killed at her home in France. Pine collapses in the jungle. In the UK, Roper picks up Danny from boarding school, ignoring the news of the ongoing Colombian civil war on the radio.

== Broadcast ==
The first episode of The Night Manager was broadcast on 21 February 2016 on BBC One in the United Kingdom. AMC Spain broadcast the series on 24 February 2016 in Spain, while TV3 in New Zealand broadcast the series on 28 February 2016. In the United States, the show premiered on 19 April 2016 on AMC. Season 1 aired in Australia on BBC First on 20 March 2016. In Finland it premiered on 22 June 2016 on MTV3. In Sweden, it first aired on 22 August 2016 on TV4, split up into eight episodes rather than the original release of six episodes. In Germany it started airing on 29 August 2016 on ZDF. The series was broadcast on Raidió Teilifís Éireann in Ireland on 29 August 2016. On 24 February 2017, The Night Manager started to air in the Netherlands on public broadcaster NPO 1, being broadcast by AVROTROS.

Series 2 began broadcasting on BBC One and BBC iPlayer in the UK on 1 January 2026. Outside the UK, the series was broadcast on Prime Video, with three episodes released on 11 January, and new episodes released weekly every Sunday, leading up to the season finale on 1 February.

== Reception ==
=== Critical response ===
==== Series 1 ====
The series holds a 91% score on review aggregator Rotten Tomatoes, with an average rating of 8.4/10 based on 67 critics. The website's critics consensus reads: "The Night Manager's smart writing and riveting story are elevated all the more by Hugh Laurie and Tom Hiddleston's captivating performances." Metacritic, which uses a weighted average, gives the series a score of 82/100 based on 32 critics, indicating "universal acclaim".

Adam Sisman, le Carré's biographer, wrote in the UK The Daily Telegraph: "It is more than 20 years since the novel was published, and in that time two film companies have tried and failed to adapt it, concluding that it was impossible to compress into two hours. But this six-hour television adaptation is long enough to give the novel its due." He added: "And though Hugh Laurie may seem a surprising choice to play 'the worst man in the world', he dominates the screen as a horribly convincing villain. Alert viewers may spot a familiar face in the background of one scene, in a restaurant: John le Carré himself makes a cameo, as he did in the films of A Most Wanted Man and Tinker Tailor Soldier Spy. But he is on screen only for an instant: blink and you'll miss him."

Reviewing the first episode for The Guardian, Archie Bland began by noting: "The Night Manager is as sexed up as television drama comes. In Tom Hiddleston and Hugh Laurie it has bona fide international stars; in John le Carré's source novel it has a pedigree of untouchable grandeur. The palette is as sumptuous as one of our hero Jonathan Pine's beautiful hotels". He added, "It's Laurie's vulpine performance that gives The Night Manager its force once the smell of money has worn off. But we barely see him for the first 40 minutes – a delayed gratification trick that's always worked like magic on me, ever since we spent the whole first episode of The West Wing waiting impatiently to meet Josiah Bartlet." Turning to Hiddleston's performance, Bland wrote: "And as the embodiment of the show's atmosphere of paralysed establishment glamour, Hiddleston is the business. When the noble beast beneath that accommodating English exterior begins to make itself known, I find the righteous revenge he's intent on wreaking on Roper compelling."

IGN reviewer Jesse Schedeen gave the serial 8.8 out of 10, saying: "The Night Manager proves that television is the ideal format to bring le Carré's novels to life. This miniseries is tightly paced, suspenseful and boasts strong performances from the likes of Hiddleston, Laurie, Colman and Hollander. With any luck, this series will open the doors for more of le Carré's classic spy tales to make their way to the small screen."

The New Yorker reviewer Emily Nussbaum was unimpressed, calling the miniseries "elegant but ultimately empty", with "overwrought sequences of doomed love", "just an old recipe made with artisanal ingredients". She praised the actors but found the characterisation of Roper "less Dr. No and more Mr. Magoo". However, Brian Tallerico called it a "brilliant adaptation" on RogerEbert.com, with praise for the performances of Hiddleston and Laurie, and for Susanne Bier's direction: "Bier brings a cinematic language to The Night Manager, and a deeper understanding of character than we often get in projects that hinge on espionage. She understands that it's not about the twists and turns of the spy game but the impact it has on those who are playing it."

==== Series 2 ====
Series 2 holds an 86% score on Rotten Tomatoes, with an average rating of 7.9/10 based on 50 reviews. The website's critics consensus reads: "Marking a belated but welcome return for Tom Hiddleston's tortured spy, The Night Manager's second season is a glamorous and haunted continuation that only gets better as it goes." Metacritic gives the series a score of 75/100 based on 17 critics, indicating "generally favorable" reviews.

Writing in The Guardian, Jack Seale gave the first episode four out of five, saying: "Although the drama still feels like cashmere and silk, the blade stashed in the folds isn’t so sharp [...] There is something fundamentally gauche, too, about the way season two methodically tries to rebuild the dynamic of the first run", but concludes: "None of this is to say The Night Manager is suddenly average: it still floats far above most of the competition. But it no longer feels pristine."

The Independent gave the first two episodes four out of five with Nick Hilton remarking: "Gripping without being excessively silly, compelling without being indulgently cerebral, The Night Manager pulls off the, increasingly rare, trick of knowing its audience, understanding its success, and replicating the formula."

=== Accolades ===
Year	Award	Category	Nominee(s)	Result	Ref.
2016	British Screenwriters' Awards	Best Crime Writing on Television (Series/Single Drama)	David Farr	Won	
2016	British Screenwriters' Awards	Outstanding Newcomer for British Television Writing	David Farr	Nominated	
2016	Critics' Choice Television Awards	Best Movie Made for Television or Limited Series	The Night Manager	Nominated	
2016	Critics' Choice Television Awards	Best Actor in a Movie Made for Television or Limited Series	Tom Hiddleston	Nominated	
2016	Critics' Choice Television Awards	Best Actress in a Movie Made for Television or Limited Series	Olivia Colman	Nominated	
2016	Critics' Choice Television Awards	Best Supporting Actor in a Movie Made for Television or Limited Series	Hugh Laurie	Nominated	
2016	Critics' Choice Television Awards	Best Supporting Actress in a Movie Made for Television or Limited Series	Elizabeth Debicki	Nominated	
2016	Hollywood Music in Media Awards	Best Main Title Theme – TV Show/Digital Streaming Series	Víctor Reyes	Won	
2016	Primetime Emmy Awards	Outstanding Limited Series	Stephen Garrett, Simon Cornwell, Stephen Cornwell, Susanne Bier, David Farr, John le Carré, Tom Hiddleston, Hugh Laurie, Alexei Boltho, William D. Johnson, and Rob Bullock	Nominated	
2016	Primetime Emmy Awards	Outstanding Lead Actor in a Limited Series or Movie	Tom Hiddleston	Nominated	
2016	Primetime Emmy Awards	Outstanding Supporting Actor in a Limited Series or a Movie	Hugh Laurie	Nominated	
2016	Primetime Emmy Awards	Outstanding Supporting Actress in a Limited Series or a Movie	Olivia Colman	Nominated	
2016	Primetime Emmy Awards	Outstanding Directing for a Limited Series, Movie or Dramatic Special	Susanne Bier	Won	
2016	Primetime Emmy Awards	Outstanding Writing for a Limited Series, Movie or Dramatic Special	David Farr	Nominated	
2016	Primetime Creative Arts Emmy Awards	Outstanding Casting for a Limited Series, Movie or Special	Jina Jay	Nominated	
2016	Primetime Creative Arts Emmy Awards	Outstanding Main Title Design	Patrick Clair, Jeff Han, Paul Kim, and Raoul Marks	Nominated	
2016	Primetime Creative Arts Emmy Awards	Outstanding Music Composition for a Limited Series, Movie or Special (Original Dramatic Score)	Victor Reyes (for "Episode 2")	Won	
2016	Primetime Creative Arts Emmy Awards	Outstanding Original Main Title Theme Music	Victor Reyes	Nominated	
2016	Primetime Creative Arts Emmy Awards	Outstanding Sound Editing for a Limited Series, Movie or Special	Adam Armitage, Howard Bargroff, Alex Sawyer, Peter Melemendjian, and Barnaby Smith (for "Episode 5")	Nominated	
2016	Primetime Creative Arts Emmy Awards	Outstanding Sound Mixing for a Limited Series or Movie	Howard Bargroff and Aitor Bernguer (for "Episode 5")	Nominated	
2016	Royal Television Society Craft & Design Awards	Best Costume Design – Drama	Signe Sejlund	Won	
2016	Royal Television Society Craft & Design Awards	Best Effects – Special	Pau Costa Moeller	Nominated	
2016	Royal Television Society Craft & Design Awards	Best Make Up Design – Drama	Jenna Wrage	Won	
2016	Royal Television Society Craft & Design Awards	Best Music – Original Title	Victor Reyes	Won	
2016	Seoul International Drama Awards	Grand Prize	The Night Manager	Won	
2016	Seoul International Drama Awards	Best Mini-Series	The Night Manager	Nominated	
2016	Seoul International Drama Awards	Best Director	Susanne Bier	Won	
2016	Television Critics Association Awards	Outstanding Achievement in Movies, Miniseries and Specials	The Night Manager	Nominated	
2017	Artios Awards	Outstanding Achievement in Casting – Television Movie or Mini-Series	Jina Jay	Nominated	
2017	Association of Motion Picture Sound Awards	Excellence in Sound for a Television Drama	Howard Bargroff, Adam Armitage, Alex Sawyer, and Aitor Berenguer	Won	
2017	British Academy Television Awards	Best Supporting Actor	Tom Hollander	Won	
2017	British Academy Television Craft Awards	Best Director – Fiction	Susanne Bier	Nominated	
2017	British Academy Television Craft Awards	Best Editing – Fiction	Ben Lester	Won	
2017	British Academy Television Craft Awards	Best Production Design	Tom Burton and Barbara H. Skelding	Nominated	
2017	British Academy Television Craft Awards	Best Sound – Fiction	Aitor Berenguer, Howard Bargroff, Alex Sawyer, and Adam Armitage	Won	
2017	British Academy Television Craft Awards	Best Special, Visual and Graphic Effects	Pau Costa Moeller and Bluebolt	Nominated	
2017	British Academy Television Craft Awards	Best Titles and Graphic Identity	Patrick Clair and Raoul Marks	Nominated	
2017	Broadcasting Press Guild Awards	Best Drama Series	The Night Manager	Won	
2017	Broadcasting Press Guild Awards	Best Actor	Hugh Laurie	Nominated	
2017	Camille Awards	Best Original Music for a Series	Victor Reyes	Won	
2017	Cinema Audio Society Awards	Outstanding Achievement in Sound Mixing for Television Movies and Mini-Series	Aitor Berenguer and Howard Bargroff (for "Episode 1")	Nominated	
2017	Empire Awards	Best TV Series	The Night Manager	Won	
2017	Golden Globe Awards	Best Limited Series or Television Film	The Night Manager	Nominated	
2017	Golden Globe Awards	Best Actor – Limited Series or Television Film	Tom Hiddleston	Won	
2017	Golden Globe Awards	Best Supporting Actor – Series, Limited Series or Television Film	Hugh Laurie	Won	
2017	Golden Globe Awards	Best Supporting Actress – Series, Limited Series or Television Film	Olivia Colman	Won	
2017	Gracie Awards	Actress in a Supporting Role – Made for TV Movie or Limited Series	Olivia Colman	Won	
2017	International Film Music Critics Association Awards	Best Original Score for a Television Series	Víctor Reyes	Nominated	
2017	Location Managers Guild Awards	Outstanding Locations in Contemporary Television	Tom Howard and Daniel Sampedro Palerm	Won	
2017	National Television Awards	Drama	The Night Manager	Nominated	
2017	National Television Awards	Drama Performance	Tom Hiddleston	Nominated	
2017	Producers Guild of America Awards	David L. Wolper Award for Outstanding Producer of Long-Form Television	Simon Cornwell, Stephen Garrett, Stephen Cornwell, Hugh Laurie, Tom Hiddleston, Susanne Bier, David Farr, John le Carré, William D. Johnson, Alexei Boltho, and Rob Bullock	Nominated	
2017	Rose d'Or Awards	Drama Series	The Night Manager	Nominated	
2017	Satellite Awards	Best Actor in a Miniseries or a Motion Picture Made for Television	Tom Hiddleston	Nominated	
2017	Satellite Awards	Best Actor in a Supporting Role in a Miniseries or a Motion Picture Made for Television	Hugh Laurie	Nominated	
2017	Satellite Awards	Best Actress in a Supporting Role in a Miniseries or a Motion Picture Made for Television	Olivia Colman	Won	
2017	Saturn Awards	Best Presentation on Television	The Night Manager	Nominated	
2017	Television and Radio Industries Club Awards	Best Crime Programme	The Night Manager	Nominated	
2017	USC Scripter Awards	Television	David Farr – Based on the novel by John le Carré	Won (Note: Tied with Scott Alexander and Larry Karaszewski for The People v. O. J. Simpson: American Crime Story: Episode: "Manna from Heaven"; Based on the book The Run of His Life: The People v. O. J. Simpson by Jeffrey Toobin.)	
