= Chris Rice (producer) =

Media executive

Chris Rice is the co-founder and co-CEO of Fifth Season formerly known as Endeavor Content, the film and TV studio that produces and distributes over 30 TV series and films a year including the Emmy winning TV series Severance, Tokyo Vice, Nine Perfect Strangers, the multi Oscar-nominated The Lost Daughter and the Book Club franchise. Rice is also an executive producer of The Night Manager, the Apple TV+ food series Omnivore and Iron Man: Armored Adventures. In 2023 & 2024, he was named by Variety as one of the 500 most influential leaders shaping the global media industry.
