= Gnomon (novel) =

2017 science fiction novel by Nick Harkaway

- UK edition cover
- Author: Nick Harkaway
- Language: English
- Genre: Science fiction
- Published: 2017
- Publisher: Heinemann
- Publication place: United Kingdom
- Media type: Print
- Pages: 704
- ISBN: 978-1-473-53954-9

Gnomon is a 2017 science fiction novel by British author Nick Harkaway. The book deals with a state that exerts ubiquitous surveillance on its population. A detective investigates a murder through unconventional methods that leads to questions about her society's very nature.

== Plot summary ==
In a near future United Kingdom, now governed by a continuous direct democracy called the System, all of Britain is under constant surveillance by the omniscient AI called "The Witness". The Witness AI is purported to be completely impartial, doing nothing "unless public safety requires it. [...] It cannot be hacked, cracked, disabled or distorted. It sees, it understands, and very occasionally it acts, but otherwise it is resolutely invisible." Mielikki Neith is an Inspector of the Witness Programme—the "prosecutorial ombudsmen to the surveillance state, reviewing and considering any case that passes a given threshold of intervention."

Neith is tasked with investigating the death of 61-year-old luddite and "writer of obscurantist magical realist novels" Diana Hunter. Hunter has died mysteriously while in Witness custody following her interrogation, a process where Hunter's memories were forcibly extracted.

In investigating Hunter's house, Neith discovers that Hunter's house is completely disconnected from the Witness by a Faraday cage. She is assaulted by a mysterious androgynous figure who claims to be named Regno Lönnrot. Without access to the Witness, Neith cannot positively identify Lönnrot, nor can she tell how Lönnrot gained access to Hunter's house.

Neith quickly finds that Hunter's memories are a seemingly impossible maze of other lives/narratives. In one narrative/memory thread, Neith sees the life of Greek investment banker Constantine Kyriakos in the early 21st century where he has a fateful encounter with a great white shark. In another, Neith sees the 5th century alchemist lover of Augustine of Hippo, Athenais Karthagonensis, as she endeavors to uncover the secrets of a chamber that could lead to the fabled Alcahest following the death of her son. In yet another, Neith sees Ethiopian painter Berihun Bekele, who lives in London in the early 21st century and assists his granddaughter Annie with the development of a video game, Witnessed, that bears striking resemblance to Neith's actual world.

Each narrative seems to share elements with the others, allowing each to flow into the other. The concepts of catabasis, a journey to the underworld like that of Orpheus in Greek myth, and apocatastasis, a sort of rebirth, in particular are repeatedly emphasized.

After leaving the hospital, Neith meets with a variety of people in an attempt to make sense of the unusual results of Hunter's interrogation. First, she meets with Ronald Tubman, a technician, and they discuss Hunter's defense against the interrogation through a technique called a "narrative blockade" (or a Scheherazade Gambit). Such a technique involves a continuous stream of false lives that prevent the interrogator from reaching the subject's true self. As the interrogation is designed to see through simple lies, the subject would have to believe in the narratives—they would have to be drawn from elements of the subject's actual life. Tubman directs her to Oliver Smith, Director of Tidal Flow at the Turnpike Trust. When Neith asks Smith what he would have done with Hunter, he suggests that a "counter-narrative" would force the disparate narratives to recombine Hunter's sense of self, allowing the interrogation team to successfully gain access to her real life and memories.

Neith then attempts to track down one of Hunter's out-of-print books from a bookstore called Shand & Co., operated by Saul Shand. Shand explains that Hunter's books "are not merely 'hard to find' in the commercial sense. They are impossible to find. They are ghost books." These "are books that are only catalogued, never actually sold."

Neith next meets with Chase Pakhet, a professor and expert in semiotics, in an attempt to make sense of the shared symbols of the various narratives. Pakhet has also attempted to track down Hunter's novels, to no avail, but has at least obtained an analysis of Hunter's work. (Pakhet believes Hunter herself may have written it.) The analysis focuses on ontological and metaphysical interpretations of Hunter's work. Neith again poses the question of how the interrogation ought to have been handled, and Pakhet reiterates the idea that "the goal is to collapse the narratives all back to the origin, the real person." Pakhet suggests, like Smith, that a counter-narrative would be the best way to do that. Pakhet points out that if the creator of that counter-narrative "were any good, you can't be entirely sure which threads are hers and which belongs to the interrogation team. [...] If you were able to be sure, so could she." When asked why she thinks Hunter did this, Pakhet suggests that Hunter wanted her interrogator to only be able to understand her by adopting her viewpoint, something which Neith vehement rejects as necessary.

Afterward, Neith realizes that, in the few glimpses she's gotten of Hunter's interrogation, she recognized one of the interrogators as Oliver Smith. She begins to suspect that Smith knew much more than he let on.

When she next sleeps, Neith encounters another new narrative in Hunter's memories. In it, an entity identifies itself as "Gnomon, occasionally called the Eschatogenesist, or sometimes the Desperation Protocol," "the Ten Thousand Ayes, and sometimes the Endlessly Rising Canon," among other names. It claims to be a being living in a far future where Earth has been forgotten and most people "exist across bodies, [...] their thoughts distributed between a large number of individual brains" by a form of instantaneous communication. Gnomon is a particularly large hive mind composed of the cast off, undesirable parts of many other individuals and is obsessed with preventing the end of the universe and the birth of replacement ones. Gnomon meets with an enormous hive mind the size of a planet called Zagreus, who offers Gnomon access to the Chamber of Isis from the Athenais narrative. The chamber acts as a sort of time machine. In exchange for access to the Chamber, Zagreus demands that Gnomon "kill the banker, the alchemist, the artist and the librarian." Neith believes this was a counter-narrative Smith devised to break Hunter.

During her investigation, Neith discovers Lönnrot and attempts to chase the fugitive through London. She discovers that the System cannot, will not, see Lönnrot—wherever Lönnrot goes, the system deliberately does not look. The revelation that the System has been compromised shakes Neith's faith in it.

Oliver Smith is murdered in an Underground tunnel. During her investigation, Neith is forced to conclude that Smith was torn apart by a gigantic shark, despite the fact that the tunnel is nowhere near the water.

In Hunter's narratives, Kyriakos is kidnapped by Nikolaos Megalos, a man who is ostensibly an Orthodox Patriarch in the Order of St. Augustine and St. Spyridon but who is actually a Greek nationalist. Kyriakos had, through his prophetic stock market manipulations (driven by the apparently godlike shark), become famously wealthy but also wiped out the investments of Megalos. Despite this, Megalos tells Kyriakos that he can resurrect his dead girlfriend by having someone symbiotically become her if Kyriakos will turn his god (the shark) over to him and help him gain access to the Chamber of Isis. Megalos brings him to an idyllic Greek village, has him meet the woman who will become Stella, and then shows Kyriakos that the Chamber of Isis can be found in Witnessed, where Kyriakos found it once before (during a drug-addled party).

Athenais, meanwhile, enters the Underworld and crosses four of the five rivers of Hades (Cocytus, Styx, Lethe, and Acheron), at one point becoming the shark that ate the watch Kyriakos dropped. She meets a demon, who she refers to as Know-All, who gives her mysterious advice and tells he she must become a god and the Alkahest to resurrect her son. The last river, Phlegethon, though is not a river of fire, as she expects, but a wall of fire that she cannot pass through.

Berihun Bekele remembers painting a portrait of Haile Selassie, the Emperor of Ethiopia, before being arrested by the Derg during the 1974 revolution. Bekele relives his escape from the Alem Bekagn prison in Addis Ababa, where he created paintings of the Chamber of Isis in his cell just before his execution then walked through the walls to escape. Bekele believes he must do this again to save himself and his granddaughter, who are trapped in a safe room in his house during a fire caused by racist terrorists.

Finally, Gnomon enters the Chamber and finds its personality fractured, believing this to be a betrayal by Zagreus. As it reassembles itself in a new vessel, it becomes Lönnrot and attacks Neith in Hunter's home.

Neith discovers that Oliver Smith was one of five Fire Judges, figures who can control the System. She discovers that Hunter was one as well, and that they took apart the personality of Anna Magdalena because she supposedly suffered from a rare form of epilepsy that caused her to suffer from "transient delusional paranoia." Afterward, Magdalena worked with Hunter, who felt sorry for what she had done to her.

Neith later discovers that both Hunter and Pakhet were Fire Judges and that the Fire Judges were aware of deep flaws in the System. Despite its purported impartiality, the Fire Judges had become aware that human irrationality would lead to the direct democracy that underpinned the System making terrible choices. Thus, they had built a backdoor into the System, Firespine, that allowed the subtle manipulation of the System in order to push for more optimal outcomes. After Firespine was created, Anna Magalena had discovered the flaw in the system and had been a threat to it—her radical neurosurgery was, in fact, an attempt to silence her to protect the System. Hunter became disillusioned with the project and retired from it; her interrogation was actually an attempt by the remaining Fire Judges to regain Hunter's control of Firespine. The Fire Judges approach Neith and tell her that they believe that her experience with Hunter's memories has made her connectome similar enough to Hunter's that she should be able to take control of Firespine and fix the system. They want her to join them.

Neith feigns compliance and then sneaks back into Hunter's house. She finds a hidden chamber under the floor that gives her access to something that looks suspiciously like the interrogation chair that Hunter died in. When she sits in it, Lönnrot enters the chamber. Hunter's various narratives begin to collapse again in Neith's head and she finally realizes why Lönnrot had asked her when Hunter's interrogation had ended. Lönnrot becomes Hunter and Neith realizes that she is the counter-narrative that was deployed against Hunter. The interrogation never ended. Hunter tells Neith that, in experiencing her memories and internal narratives, she's become like her enough that she believes Neith will help her in defeating the interrogation and bringing an end to the flawed System. Neith acquiesces.

Hunter escapes the interrogation (seeming much like Anne Bekele) and each of Hunter's narratives comes to a conclusion, separating back out again. Bekele escapes the safe room; Kyriakos is rescued from Megalos; Athenais returns home in control of the Alkahest (whether or not she resurrects her son is left to the reader to figure out); and Neith remains intact but alone in Hunter's subconscious. The book concludes with Gnomon addressing the reader, saying that, as a meme, it has come to live inside the reader through the act of reading its story: "I am Gnomon. From this moment, so are you."

== Reception ==
In The Washington Post, Michael Dirda gave a very positive review.

Imagine, if you will, a Pynchonesque mega-novel that periodically calls to mind the films Inception and The Matrix, Raymond Chandler's quest romances about detective Philip Marlowe, John le Carré's intricately recursive Tinker, Tailor, Soldier, Spy, the dizzying science fiction of Philip K. Dick, William Gibson and Neal Stephenson, Iain Pears's hypertextual Arcadia and Haruki Murakami's alternate world 1Q84 and even this week's Washington Post story about China's push for 'total surveillance.' What would such an ambitious book look like? You know the answer already.

Dirda's primary reservation was that the book was "probably a little too long", but ended saying, "Like a Cedar Point roller coaster, its final chapters will leave your head spinning. But what a ride!”

In The Independent, Darragh McManus gave a negative review, calling the book a "baffling utopian epic ladled with elegant nonsense." While praising Harkaway for "writing women extremely well" ("Hunter, Neith and Athenais are the book's most vivid creations and strongest elements"), and saying "there are a lot of things to enjoy in Gnomon," she nevertheless felt it was "hugely confusing."

It's not the length, though the novel is much too long. It's not that Harkaway has a tendency to overwrite: both in labouring a point or observation before labouring it some more, and using arcane (and possibly non-existent) words where a normal, widely-known one was available. [...] My main problem is that Gnomon doesn't make a lick of sense. Or maybe it does, in the author's mind, but I'm afraid I was baffled, to the point of paralysed stupidity. I genuinely couldn't tell you, by the end, who did what and when, whether anything reported here actually occurred, whether any or all of these characters even exist.

In The Guardian, Steven Poole also gave the book a relatively negative review. "Gnomon [...] reads like the first draft of what might have been a tighter 400-page book rather than a rambling 700-pager. Progress is routinely halted by sketchy Wikipedia-style exposition-dumps about tidal flow or behavioural economics, or a character asking herself a whole page or two of questions about what just happened, or vague disquisitions on the meaning of identity. Things are repeatedly explained, unnecessarily." Still, Poole also said, "Such defects wouldn't be so annoying were it not obvious that Nick Harkaway can sometimes be a very good writer indeed. Readers who are prepared to mentally edit the book as they go along, as the author and editor have not, will encounter a host of highly enjoyable fragments and suggestive ideas." Then again, the same paper also picked the novel as one of its best books of the year, with Adam Roberts describing it as "an amazing and quite unforgettable piece of fiction."

For NPR, Jason Sheehan gave a mixed review, saying, "it's a big book, a digressive book, and it contains so much that it sometimes feels (like Diana Hunter's house is supposed to feel) like a museum of curiosities trapped between two covers and shaken vigorously. You can't help but be hooked by a detail here, a tic of recursive language there, until suddenly, you know things about Isis, ocean water or the Thames that you never thought would be interesting until Harkaway dangled them in front of you."

For Tor.com, Niall Alexander gave a very positive review. "its vast canvas takes in tales of inexplicable ancient history, our appallingly prescient present and, fittingly, the far flung future, all of which orbit Gnomon’s central Orwellian thread like spy satellites on an imminent collision course." Alexander called the twisting narrative "a puzzle that proves a pleasure to pursue," complaining only that "when answers are handed to us on pretty little platters, it cheapens an experience so rich as to be remarkable in every remaining respect." Alexander concluded,

In its cautionary characters and in its careful construction, in its incredible creativity and in its conversely very credible commentary, Harkaway's latest is likely his greatest. As in The Gone-Away World and Angelmaker before it, the macro is simply magnificent—Gnomon bursts at the seams with appealing ideas, powerfully put, and perhaps more relevant than ever—but bolstered as it is by the micro that made Tigerman so moving at the same time as being buttressed by the author's inquiries into the meaning of life in the digital era in The Blind Giant, this isn't just a big, brash book about technology or horology, it's a breathtakingly bold, barely-tamed beast of a read about being human in an increasingly alien age.
