= Union of Jewish Women =

British Jewish women's society

The Union of Jewish Women (UJW) was a trade union and the first national Jewish women's society in Britain. The UJW was formed with the intention of bringing women's perspectives to matters of importance to the Jewish community.

== Formation ==
The UJW was formed in 1902. Poor Russian Jewish immigrants settling in the East End of London created demand for services for this community. The UJW was formed to address issues that Jewish women faced through activism.

It was inspired by the National Union of Women Workers (NUWW), which had been established in 1895. In 1900, a group of Jewish women gathered at the home of Lady Louisa de Rothschild and decided to organise the May 1902 Conference of Jewish Women.

== Work ==
The Union declared itself to be an "all-embracing sisterhood," forming a "bond between Jewish women of all degrees and all shades of opinion, religious, social and intellectual."

The Union organized a system of volunteers trained to help women seeking employment and to assist Jewish charitable institutions. Before World War I the UJW was composed primarily of upper-class women who had little contact with the working class women the organisation was created to help.

The UJW had mixed success; in 1924 the Council of the United Synagogue voted against the franchise for women, though many of those individual synagogues had already agreed to support it. In order to be more effective, the UJW joined many women's organisations to promote further extension of women's suffrage.

The UJW dissolved in 1930.

== Notable members ==
- Alice Model
- Eleanor Nathan
- Lady Louise De Rothschild (founding member)
- Nina Salaman
- Constance Hoster
