= Alice Model =

British Jewish philanthropist (1856–1943)

Alice Model

Alice Model (1856–1943) was a leader of the Union of Jewish Women. She founded and supported organisations promoting family welfare and other philanthropic causes.

== Personal life ==
Alice Isabella Model née Sichel was born on 13 November 1856, the daughter of Henriette Goldschmidt and Gustavus Sichel, and grew up in a middle-class family that resided in Hampstead, London. Like a growing number of women of her time, Model expanded the acceptable horizons for women through her involvement in charitable activities. Married to Louis Model at twenty-four and childless, she devoted her life to social work and initiated many social services for women and children.

== Maternal welfare ==
She sat on the Child and Maternity Committee for Stepney and represented Stepney in the London Federation of Infant Welfare Centres. In 1895 she founded the Sick Room Helps Society, which evolved into the Jewish Maternity Hospital in Underwood Street in 1911. The organisation aimed to help sick, poor and confined women within their homes in the East End. The organisation was the first of its kind in the United Kingdom, providing home helps and maternity nurses - one of the most important contributions to maternal healthcare. It provided a model for many state and private agencies which followed suit.

Alma Cogan, Lionel Bart and Arnold Wesker were born in the Jewish Maternity Hospital. It closed its doors in 1939. Despite a campaign to try and save it, in 2012 the hospital was demolished by the Peabody Trust, who have used the land to build flats.

== Nursery ==
Model was also a key player in the formation of a nursery on Shepherd Street in Spitalfields, which initially prioritised the children of widows, so they could work and would not be completely dependent on charity. The nursery is cited as eliminating illnesses rife in the East End by providing children with regular meals, places to wash and disinfecting their clothes. Daily visits from doctors also prevented illnesses reaching epidemic proportions. By 1911 annual attendance by children reached 11342. Lady Louisa Rothschild was president of the nursery. The nursery was renamed the Alice Model Nursery School to honour Model's 80th birthday. The Alice Model Nursery School still exists in Stepney today.

== Other causes ==
Model recruited volunteers for good causes through the Union of Jewish Women and trained them to support poorer women who shared their religion. She always emphasised self-reliance and disapproved of charity that seemed to undermine individual responsibility.

She served on a London committee for dealing with the new National Health Insurance Act (1912), and on a committee administering the National Relief Fund in World War One where she was a Jewish Board of Guardians representative. In 1933, when she was already in her seventies, she joined the Jewish Refugees Committee and helped with refugees’ housing needs.

== Honours ==
On her 70th birthday she was presented with an illuminated album inscribed with the names of 22 societies and 367 people who had been associated with her. She was appointed an MBE in the 1935 New Year’s Honours list. The following year, the Alice Model Nursery School was named in her honour. (See above.)
