= Constance Hoster =

Constance Paulina Hoster (8 July 1864 – 1 June 1939) was a British writer and pioneer in training women for employment.

Born in St Pancras, London, the only daughter of Marcus Kalisch, an Old Testament scholar and migrant from Prussian Pomerania, Hoster had a brother, Alfred Kalisch, who later became a barrister, journalist, and musical historian.

On 9 October 1889, at Dieppe, she married Albert Bertram Mathew Hoster, of Saint-Nicolas-d'Aliermont, Normandy, and Grove House, Sydenham.

In 1895, she petitioned for divorce and in 1896 obtained a final decree in the High Court of Justice.

In 1893, faced with the need to support herself, Hoster launched her business career, encouraged by Gertrude King, Secretary of the Society for Promoting the Employment of Women. She soon began to train other women in typing and shorthand writing, to work as secretaries, launched an employment agency for women, and founded the Educated Women Workers' Loan Training Fund.

By January 1909, Hoster was occupying St Stephen's Chambers, Telegraph Street, London E.C., running a business called Queen Anne's Typewriting Shorthand & Translating Offices. In 1920, she founded the Gertrude King scholarship. By the time of her death in 1939, she owned Mrs Hoster's Secretarial College in the Cromwell Road, Kensington, and another in the City of London at St Stephen's Chambers.

An obituary noted that Hoster trained "well-educated women" for positions in the secretarial, commercial, and political worlds: in short, applicants needed to have a good education before coming to her.

Hoster was one of the first women to be elected to the London Chamber of Commerce. She also became President of the City of London Society for Equal Citizenship and vice-president of the Union of Jewish Women, the Society of Women Journalists, and the City of London branch of the League of Nations Union. She was a governor of the Royal Free Hospital and the London Jewish Hospital.

A Conservative, Hoster was on the Committee of the women's branch of the City of London Conservative and Unionist Association.

She belonged to the Ladies' Carlton Club, the Cowdray Club, the Langham Place Group, and the Overseas, Pioneer, and Forum Clubs.

Hoster died on 1 June 1939, at 7 Sheffield Terrace, Kensington, leaving an estate valued for probate at £20,565; but Mrs Hoster's Secretarial College in Kensington continued to flourish. During the Second World War, it was evacuated to a large house near Stamford, Lincolnshire, but returned to London when the bombing threat was over. The secretarial course typically lasted six months and was funded by charging fees. In the 1940s, the Union of Jewish Women provided a scholarship at Mrs Hoster's to be held by a Jewish girl recommended personally by the Union.

By the 1950s, the College was known for turning out "gels for the establishment". It continued in business until 1969, with Mrs P. C. Bloncourt serving as Principal from 1956 to 1969. In its later years it was at 27, Brompton Road.

== Selected publications ==
- Constance Hoster, "The training of educated women for secretarial and commercial work, and their permanent employment" in Journal of the Royal Society of Arts Vol. 65, No. 3353 (23 February 1917), 262–269
- Ellen, Countess of Desart, Constance Hoster, Style and Title: a Complete Guide to Social Forms of Address (London: Christopher's, 1925)

== Notable students of Mrs Hoster's Secretarial College ==
- Lady Cynthia Postan
- Monica Maurice
- Stevie Smith
- Doreen Pugh, secretary to Winston Churchill
- Joan Bright Astley
- Jane Cornwell
- Anne Griffiths
