= The Gone-Away World =

2008 novel by Nick Harkaway

- First edition
- Author: Nick Harkaway
- Language: English
- Genre: Science fiction
- Publisher: Heinemann
- Publication date: June 2008
- Publication place: England
- Media type: Print (Hardback)
- Pages: 544 (Hardcover)
- ISBN: 978-0-434-01842-0
- OCLC: 213382271

The Gone-Away World is the debut novel of British author Nick Harkaway, a science fiction story set in a post-apocalyptic world crippled by the 'Go-Away War'. The book was first published in June 2008 by Heinemann.

The book is written from the perspective of a single character, part of a group of ex-special operatives turned truckers that collectively make up the 'Haulage & HazMat Emergency Civil Freebooting Company'. The story largely focuses on the lives of the narrator and that of his best friend, a member of the company.

== Plot summary ==
The book is a science fiction epic with elements of comedy and nuclear holocaust fiction. It tells the story of the unnamed main character and his best friend, Gonzo Lubitsch, and their experiences during and after "The Go-Away War", a conflict that reduces the world population to 2 billion. The "go-away bombs" and similar weapons used by the belligerents were designed to make anything subjected to them cease to exist, leaving no carnage or wreckage behind. The weapons, however, produced an unanticipated after effect. The matter that had "gone-away" was still there but merely stripped of the information which formerly differentiated and defined it. This "Stuff", as it is called, floats around the world in great storms and pools in various locations. When it comes into contact with people, a process referred to as "reification" occurs. The Stuff takes the form of whatever those present are thinking about. The results are often horrific. Apparitions, as well as whole beings, appear out of nothing. Such people become known as "the new". To combat the Stuff, the war's survivors rely upon a substance called "FOX" which is produced by Jorgmond, a corporation that, for all intents and purposes, functions as the only governmental authority by virtue of the constant and universal need for their product. FOX is delivered through "the Jorgmund pipe", which snakes around the globe and permits the population to live in a thin ribbon of habitable land banded on either side by wasteland.

The story begins with the characters in the "Nameless Bar". The company they work for, the Haulage & HazMat Emergency Civil Freebooting Company is hired by Jorgmund to extinguish a fire that has broken out on the Jorgmund pipe itself, endangering what remains of humanity. As the company sets off, the unnamed protagonist reminiscences back to the day he first met Gonzo, and his path through high school, college, and then joining the military. The book recounts his relationship with Elizabeth Soames, whom he meets as a youth studying martial arts under the tutelage of Master Wu. Wu's school, the Voiceless Dragon, is the mortal enemy of a band of ninjas called the Society of the Clockwork Hand. In the end, the story comes back to the opening passage and the effort to extinguish the burning pipeline, which turns out to be maliciously connected to enemies that Gonzo and the protagonist have been dealing with for many years, and to evil plans by Jorgmund itself. Gonzo and others close to the protagonist are kidnapped, leading to a final confrontation, the revelation of the horrors behind the manufacture of FOX, and the final resolution of the long battle between the ninjas and the Voiceless Dragon.

== Reception ==
Linda L. Richards, editor of January Magazine, praised the novel saying that it "leaves the reader gasping for both adjectives and description. It’s a powerful and accomplished first novel that weaves elements of romance, mystery, SF/F and -- yes -- thriller together in a way that leaves no doubt that the master storyteller gene really is something that can be passed along." She also said "Harkaway's style puts me a bit in mind of the very best of Douglas Adams for the pure skittering, off-the-wall humor and of Douglas Coupland’s keen eye for cultural detail and well-developed sense of the ridiculous." Steven Poole was mixed in his review for The Guardian said "Reading The Gone-Away World is a bit like spending a week with a hyperactive puppy: there are delightful moments aplenty, but it's slightly wearing over the long run. Still, any author who has come up with the beautifully silly plan of melding a kung-fu epic with an Iraq-war satire and a Mad Max adventure has to be worth keeping an eye on." Ed King was again somewhat mixed in his review for The Daily Telegraph saying "but amid the chapter-long digressions and manic proliferation of characters, the narrative threatens to collapse under the weight of its own excess. Words clearly come easily to Harkaway (his father is John le Carré; perhaps it runs in the family) but he tends to lose sight of the plot and his duty to the reader. Nevertheless, The Gone-Away World is an impressive feat of imagination and a wildly exuberant ride."

The Gone-Away World was nominated in 2009 for a Locus Award for Best First Novel and a BSFA Award for Best Novel.

== Sources ==
- Interview with the author on The Guardian (UK) website
- The Gone-Away World on the Waterstones website
