= Jane Cornwell =

English editor (1938–2021)

Valerie Jane Cornwell (28 April 1938 – 27 February 2021) was an English editor, known as Jane Eustace before her marriage to John le Carré (David Cornwell) in 1972.

For most of her career she was an executive and editor at the book-publishing firm Hodder & Stoughton.

== Early life ==
Born in 1938 in Sevenoaks, Kent, Cornwell was the daughter of Robert Eustace, a dental surgeon, and his wife Grace Marley Herring, a daughter of George Herbert Herring, a journalist. She had two brothers, one older, one younger. During the Second World War, the family moved to Devon and then to Northern Ireland. After returning to England, she was educated at St Hilary's School, Sevenoaks, and at Sherborne School for Girls, where she played cricket. She then took a course at Mrs Hoster's Secretarial Training College in Cromwell Road, Kensington, which was known for its "gels for the establishment".

== Career ==
Cornwell went to work for George Greenfield, head of the literary agency John Farquharson. He offered her a partnership when she was head-hunted to be foreign rights manager at Hodder & Stoughton, but she took the job and remained there for more than forty years. She was a regular visitor to Mary Stewart in Scotland until her death in 2014 and negotiated for Gavin Maxwell when his Ring of Bright Water (1960) was turned into a film. After she married le Carré, Greenfield became his literary agent and Hodder & Stoughton his publisher.

== Life with John le Carré ==
Jane Eustace met John le Carré at a literary event in Birmingham. He began to call her "Oysters" after a German at the Frankfurt Book Fair had mispronounced her name. She introduced him to Robert Gottlieb, who became his American editor, and she gave him significant help with A Small Town in Germany (1968), a book which was in a confused state of rewriting. He noted "I find her compassionate, understanding, and remarkably intelligent." Le Carré divorced his first wife in 1971 and married Cornwell in 1972. She helped him with twenty more books, including his last novel, Agent Running in the Field (2019). After le Carré donated his papers to the Bodleian Library, its director, Richard Ovenden, wrote that the drafts of Tinker Tailor Soldier Spy, The Russia House, and The Little Drummer Girl showed the depth of Cornwell's part in them, noting "Her participation in the creation of the novels, which was constructively editorial, has been too often overlooked... The early drafts show a deep process of collaboration with his wife, Jane."

As well as gaining three stepsons, Cornwell had one son with le Carré, who writes under the name Nick Harkaway. He has also written about how closely his parents worked together.

Cornwell died on 27 February 2021, a few months after her husband.
